= 1889 Washington Nationals season =

1889 Washington Nationals
- League: National League
- Ballpark: Swampdoodle Grounds
- City: Washington, D.C.
- Record: 41–83 (.331)
- League place: 8th
- Managers: John Morrill, Arthur Irwin

The 1889 Washington Nationals finished with a 41–83 record in the National League, finishing in last place. The team folded at the conclusion of the season.

== Offseason ==
- January 11, 1889: Wild Bill Widner was purchased from the Nationals by the Columbus Solons.

== Regular season ==
=== Season standings ===
National League
Team	W	L	Pct.	GB	Home	Road
New York Giants	83	43	.659	—	47‍–‍15	36‍–‍28
Boston Beaneaters	83	45	.648	1	48‍–‍17	35‍–‍28
Chicago White Stockings	67	65	.508	19	37‍–‍30	30‍–‍35
Philadelphia Quakers	63	64	.496	20½	43‍–‍24	20‍–‍40
Pittsburgh Alleghenys	61	71	.462	25	40‍–‍28	21‍–‍43
Cleveland Spiders	61	72	.459	25½	33‍–‍35	28‍–‍37
Indianapolis Hoosiers	59	75	.440	28	32‍–‍36	27‍–‍39
Washington Nationals	41	83	.331	41	24‍–‍29	17‍–‍54

=== Record vs. opponents ===
1889 National League record Sources:
Team	BSN	CHI	CLE	IND	NYG	PHI	PIT	WAS
Boston	—	10–7–1	12–8–1	10–10	8–6–2	13–6	16–3	14–5–1
Chicago	7–10–1	—	11–9	13–7	5–13–1	9–10–1	10–9–1	12–7
Cleveland	8–12–1	9–11	—	9–10–1	4–14	10–9	7–13	14–3–1
Indianapolis	10–10	7–13	10–9–1	—	7–13	4–13	10–10	11–7
New York	6–8–2	13–5–1	14–4	13–7	—	12–7–1	12–7–1	13–5
Philadelphia	6–13	10–9–1	9–10	13–4	7–12–1	—	9–9	9–7–1
Pittsburgh	3–16	9–10–1	13–7	10–10	7–12–1	9–9	—	10–7
Washington	5–14–1	7–12	3–14–1	7–11	5–13	7–9–1	7–10	—

=== Roster ===
1889 Washington Nationals
Roster
Pitchers: Alex Ferson; George Haddock; Egyptian Healy; George Keefe; Gus Krock; Hank O'Day; Mike Sullivan; John Thornton	Catchers: Jim Banning; Spider Clark; Tom Daly; Hi Ebright; Connie Mack; John Riddle; Infielders: Jack Carney; Jim Donnelly; Arthur Irwin; John Irwin; Art McCoy; John Morrill; Al Myers; Billy O'Brien; Pete Sweeney; Sam Wise	Outfielders: Ed Beecher; Harry Clarke; Dummy Hoy; George Shoch; Walt Wilmot	Manager: Arthur Irwin; John Morrill

== Player stats ==
=== Batting ===
==== Starters by position ====
Note: Pos = Position; G = Games played; AB = At bats; H = Hits; Avg. = Batting average; HR = Home runs; RBI = Runs batted in

Pos	Player	G	AB	H	Avg.	HR	RBI
C	Tom Daly	71	250	75	.300	1	40
1B	John Carney	69	273	63	.231	1	29
2B	Sam Wise	121	472	118	.250	4	62
SS	Arthur Irwin	85	313	73	.233	0	32
3B	John Irwin	58	228	66	.289	0	25
OF	Walt Wilmot	108	432	125	.289	9	57
OF	Dummy Hoy	127	507	139	.274	0	39
OF	Ed Beecher	42	179	53	.296	0	30

==== Other batters ====
Note: G = Games played; AB = At bats; H = Hits; Avg. = Batting average; HR = Home runs; RBI = Runs batted in

Player	G	AB	H	Avg.	HR	RBI
Connie Mack	98	386	113	.293	0	42
Pete Sweeney	49	193	44	.228	1	23
Al Myers	46	176	46	.261	0	20
John Morrill	44	146	27	.185	2	16
Spider Clark	38	145	37	.255	3	22
George Shoch	30	109	26	.239	0	11
Hi Ebright	16	59	15	.254	1	6
John Riddle	11	37	8	.216	0	3
Jim Donnelly	4	13	2	.154	0	0
Billy O'Brien	2	8	0	.000	0	0
Art McCoy	2	6	0	.000	0	0
Harry Corson Clarke	1	3	0	.000	0	0
Jim Banning	2	1	0	.000	0	0

=== Pitching ===
==== Starting pitchers ====
Note: G = Games pitched; IP = Innings pitched; W = Wins; L = Losses; ERA = Earned run average; SO = Strikeouts

Player	G	IP	W	L	ERA	SO
Alex Ferson	36	288.1	17	17	3.90	85
George Haddock	33	276.1	11	19	4.20	106
George Keefe	30	230.0	8	18	5.13	90
Egyptian Healy	13	101.0	1	11	6.24	49
Hank O'Day	13	108.0	2	10	4.33	23
Gus Krock	6	48.0	2	4	5.25	17
John Thornton	1	9.0	0	1	5.00	3

==== Other pitchers ====
Note: G = Games pitched; IP = Innings pitched; W = Wins; L = Losses; ERA = Earned run average; SO = Strikeouts

Player	G	IP	W	L	ERA	SO
Mike Sullivan	9	41.0	0	3	7.24	15

==== Relief pitchers ====
Note: G = Games pitched; W = Wins; L = Losses; SV = Saves; ERA = Earned run average; SO = Strikeouts

Player	G	W	L	SV	ERA	SO
Arthur Irwin	1	0	0	0	0.00	0
John Morrill	1	0	0	0	0.00	0
