= 1889 Indianapolis Hoosiers season =

1889 Indianapolis Hoosiers
- League: National League
- Ballpark: Athletic Park
- City: Indianapolis, Indiana
- Record: 59–75 (.440)
- League place: 7th
- Owner: John T. Brush
- Managers: Frank Bancroft, Jack Glasscock

The 1889 Indianapolis Hoosiers finished with a 59–75 record in the National League, finishing in seventh place. The team folded after the season concluded.

== Regular season ==
=== Season standings ===
National League
Team	W	L	Pct.	GB	Home	Road
New York Giants	83	43	.659	—	47‍–‍15	36‍–‍28
Boston Beaneaters	83	45	.648	1	48‍–‍17	35‍–‍28
Chicago White Stockings	67	65	.508	19	37‍–‍30	30‍–‍35
Philadelphia Quakers	63	64	.496	20½	43‍–‍24	20‍–‍40
Pittsburgh Alleghenys	61	71	.462	25	40‍–‍28	21‍–‍43
Cleveland Spiders	61	72	.459	25½	33‍–‍35	28‍–‍37
Indianapolis Hoosiers	59	75	.440	28	32‍–‍36	27‍–‍39
Washington Nationals	41	83	.331	41	24‍–‍29	17‍–‍54

=== Record vs. opponents ===
1889 National League record Sources:
Team	BSN	CHI	CLE	IND	NYG	PHI	PIT	WAS
Boston	—	10–7–1	12–8–1	10–10	8–6–2	13–6	16–3	14–5–1
Chicago	7–10–1	—	11–9	13–7	5–13–1	9–10–1	10–9–1	12–7
Cleveland	8–12–1	9–11	—	9–10–1	4–14	10–9	7–13	14–3–1
Indianapolis	10–10	7–13	10–9–1	—	7–13	4–13	10–10	11–7
New York	6–8–2	13–5–1	14–4	13–7	—	12–7–1	12–7–1	13–5
Philadelphia	6–13	10–9–1	9–10	13–4	7–12–1	—	9–9	9–7–1
Pittsburgh	3–16	9–10–1	13–7	10–10	7–12–1	9–9	—	10–7
Washington	5–14–1	7–12	3–14–1	7–11	5–13	7–9–1	7–10	—

=== Roster ===
1889 Indianapolis Hoosiers
Roster
Pitchers: Varney Anderson; Henry Boyle; Bill Burdick; Jack Fanning; Jack Fee; Charlie Getzien; Gus Krock; Amos Rusie; Lev Shreve; Jim Whitney	Catchers: Dick Buckley; Con Daily; Andy Sommers; Pete Weckbecker; Infielders: Charley Bassett; Jerry Denny; Jack Glasscock; Paul Hines; Jumbo Schoeneck	Outfielders: Ed Andrews; Jack McGeachey; George Myers; Emmett Seery; Marty Sullivan	Manager: Frank Bancroft; Jack Glasscock

== Player stats ==
=== Batting ===
==== Starters by position ====
Note: Pos = Position; G = Games played; AB = At bats; H = Hits; Avg. = Batting average; HR = Home runs; RBI = Runs batted in

Pos	Player	G	AB	H	Avg.	HR	RBI
C	Dick Buckley	68	260	67	.258	8	41
1B	Paul Hines	121	486	148	.305	6	72
2B	Charley Bassett	127	477	117	.245	4	68
3B	Jerry Denny	133	578	163	.282	18	112
SS	Jack Glasscock	134	582	205	.352	7	85
OF	Emmett Seery	127	526	165	.314	8	59
OF	Marty Sullivan	69	256	73	.285	4	35
OF	Jack McGeachey	131	532	142	.267	2	63

==== Other batters ====
Note: G = Games played; AB = At bats; H = Hits; Avg. = Batting average; HR = Home runs; RBI = Runs batted in

Player	G	AB	H	Avg.	HR	RBI
Con Daily	62	219	55	.251	0	26
Ed Andrews	40	173	53	.306	0	22
George Myers	43	149	29	.195	0	12
Andy Sommers	23	84	21	.250	2	14
Jumbo Schoeneck	16	62	15	.242	0	8
Pete Weckbecker	1	1	0	.000	0	2

=== Pitching ===
==== Starting pitchers ====
Note: G = Games pitched; IP = Innings pitched; W = Wins; L = Losses; ERA = Earned run average; SO = Strikeouts

Player	G	IP	W	L	ERA	SO
Henry Boyle	46	378.2	21	23	3.92	97
Charlie Getzien	45	349.0	18	22	4.54	139
Jim Whitney	9	70.0	2	7	6.81	16
Gus Krock	4	32.0	2	2	7.31	10
Lev Shreve	3	15.2	0	3	13.79	5
Jack Fanning	1	1.0	0	1	18.00	0

==== Other pitchers ====
Note: G = Games pitched; IP = Innings pitched; W = Wins; L = Losses; ERA = Earned run average; SO = Strikeouts

Player	G	IP	W	L	ERA	SO
Amos Rusie	33	225.0	12	10	5.32	109
Bill Burdick	10	45.2	2	4	4.53	16
Jack Fee	7	40.0	2	2	4.28	10
Varney Anderson	2	12.0	0	1	4.50	3

==== Relief pitchers ====
Note: G = Games pitched; W = Wins; L = Losses; SV = Saves; ERA = Earned run average; SO = Strikeouts

Player	G	W	L	SV	ERA	SO
Jack McGeachey	3	0	0	0	11.57	3
Jack Glasscock	1	0	0	0	0.00	0
