= 1889 Major League Baseball season =

1889 MLB season
- League: American Association (AA); National League (NL)
- Sport: Baseball
- Duration: Regular season: April 17 – October 15, 1889 (AA); April 24 – October 5, 1889 (NL); World's Championship Series: October 18–29, 1889
- Games: 140
- Teams: 16 (8 per league)

Pennant winner
- AA champions: Brooklyn Bridegrooms
- AA runners-up: St. Louis Browns
- NL champions: New York Giants
- NL runners-up: Boston Beaneaters

World's Championship Series
- Venue: Polo Grounds, New York, New York; Washington Park, Brooklyn, New York
- Champions: New York Giants
- Runners-up: Brooklyn Bridegrooms

MLB seasons
- ← 1888 1890 →

Locations of teams for the 1889 American Association season
American Association
Locations of teams for the 1889 National League season
National League

The 1889 major league baseball season began on April 17, 1889. The regular season ended on October 15, with the New York Giants and the Brooklyn Bridegrooms as regular season champions of the National League and American Association, respectively. The postseason began with Game 1 of the sixth World's Championship Series on October 18 and ended with Game 9 on October 29, in what was a best-of-eleven-playoff. The Giants defeated the Dodgers, six games to three, capturing their second consecutive World's Championship Series.

Over the offseason, the National League's Detroit Wolverines folded, and saw them replaced by the American Association's Cleveland Blues, renamed to the Cleveland Spiders. In Cleveland's AA place, the Columbus Solons were enfranchised. This was the final season of the NL's Indianapolis Hoosiers & Washington Nationals, and the AA's Kansas City Cowboys.

== Schedule ==
The 1889 schedule consisted of 140 games for all teams in the American Association and National League, each of which had eight teams. Each team was scheduled to play 20 games against the other seven teams of their respective league. This continued the format put in place by the American Association since the 1886 season and by the National League since the previous season. This format would last until 1892.

American Association Opening Day took place on April 17 featuring four teams, while National League Opening Day took place on April 24, featuring all eight teams. The American Association would see its final day of the regular season on October 15 with four teams playing, while the National League would see its final day of the season on October 5, featuring all eight teams. The 1889 World's Championship Series took place between October 18 and October 29.

== Rule changes ==
The 1889 season saw the following rule changes:

- The sacrifice hit is now statistically recognized.
- Four balls is now considered a base on balls (BB); previously, five balls were considered base on balls.
- One predesignated substitute may be used at the end of any complete inning.
- A batted ball striking the umpire stationed behind the pitcher would count as a single for the batter and any baserunner would be allowed to move up one base.
- The foul tip was abolished.
- No assist awarded to a pitcher on a strikeout.

== Teams ==
An asterisk (*) denotes the ballpark a team played the minority of their home games at

League	Team	City	Ballpark	Capacity	Manager
American Association	Baltimore Orioles	Baltimore, Maryland	Oriole Park	7,000	Billy Barnie
American Association	Brooklyn Bridegrooms	Brooklyn, New York	Washington Park	3,000	Bill McGunnigle
American Association	Cincinnati Red Stockings	Cincinnati, Ohio	American Park	3,000	Gus Schmelz
American Association	Columbus Solons	Columbus, Ohio	Recreation Park (Columbus)	6,500	Al Buckenberger
American Association	Kansas City Cowboys	Kansas City, Missouri	Exposition Park	4,000	Bill Watkins
American Association	Louisville Colonels	Louisville, Kentucky	Eclipse Park	5,860	Dude Esterbrook
American Association	Louisville Colonels	Louisville, Kentucky	Eclipse Park	5,860	Jimmy Wolf
American Association	Louisville Colonels	Louisville, Kentucky	Eclipse Park	5,860	Dan Shannon
American Association	Louisville Colonels	Louisville, Kentucky	Eclipse Park	5,860	Jack Chapman
American Association	Philadelphia Athletics	Philadelphia, Pennsylvania	Jefferson Street Grounds	15,000	Bill Sharsig
American Association	St. Louis Browns	St. Louis, Missouri	Sportsman's Park	12,000	Charles Comiskey
National League	Boston Beaneaters	Boston, Massachusetts	South End Grounds	6,800	Jim Hart
National League	Chicago White Stockings	Chicago, Illinois	West Side Park	6,000	Cap Anson
National League	Cleveland Spiders	Cleveland, Ohio	National League Park	Unknown	Tom Loftus
National League	Indianapolis Hoosiers	Indianapolis, Indiana	Seventh Street Park	Unknown	Frank Bancroft
National League	Indianapolis Hoosiers	Indianapolis, Indiana	Seventh Street Park	Unknown	Jack Glasscock
National League	New York Giants	Jersey City, New Jersey*	Oakland Park*	Unknown*	Jim Mutrie
National League	New York Giants	St. George, New York*	St. George Cricket Grounds*	5,100*	Jim Mutrie
National League	New York Giants	New York, New York	Polo Grounds	15,000	Jim Mutrie
National League	Philadelphia Quakers	Philadelphia, Pennsylvania	Philadelphia Base Ball Grounds	12,500	Harry Wright
National League	Pittsburgh Alleghenys	Allegheny, Pennsylvania	Recreation Park (Pittsburgh)	17,000	Horace Phillips
National League	Pittsburgh Alleghenys	Allegheny, Pennsylvania	Recreation Park (Pittsburgh)	17,000	Fred Dunlap
National League	Pittsburgh Alleghenys	Allegheny, Pennsylvania	Recreation Park (Pittsburgh)	17,000	Ned Hanlon
National League	Washington Nationals	Washington, D.C.	Swampoodle Grounds	6,000	John Morrill
National League	Washington Nationals	Washington, D.C.	Swampoodle Grounds	6,000	Arthur Irwin

=== Sunday games ===
Blue laws restricted Sunday activities in several localities, causing several teams of the American Association (which was informally referred to as the "Beer & Whiskey League" due to its openness on alcohol, compared to the National League) to play at ballparks in a different locality.

Team	City	Ballpark	Capacity	Games played
Brooklyn Bridegrooms	Ridgewood, New York	Ridgewood Park	10,000	14
Philadelphia Athletics	Gloucester City, New Jersey	Gloucester Point Grounds	Unknown	14

1. In today's New York, New York.
2. Initial version of stadium burned in a fire in mid-May and was rebuilt in time before the need for a neutral site.
3. In today's Pittsburgh, Pennsylvania.

== Standings ==
=== American Association ===
American Association
Team	W	L	Pct.	GB	Home	Road
Brooklyn Bridegrooms	93	44	.679	—	50‍–‍19	43‍–‍25
St. Louis Browns	90	45	.667	2	51‍–‍18	39‍–‍27
Philadelphia Athletics	75	58	.564	16	46‍–‍22	29‍–‍36
Cincinnati Red Stockings	76	63	.547	18	47‍–‍26	29‍–‍37
Baltimore Orioles	70	65	.519	22	40‍–‍24	30‍–‍41
Columbus Solons	60	78	.435	33½	36‍–‍33	24‍–‍45
Kansas City Cowboys	55	82	.401	38	35‍–‍35	20‍–‍47
Louisville Colonels	27	111	.196	66½	18‍–‍46	9‍–‍65

=== National League ===
National League
Team	W	L	Pct.	GB	Home	Road
New York Giants	83	43	.659	—	47‍–‍15	36‍–‍28
Boston Beaneaters	83	45	.648	1	48‍–‍17	35‍–‍28
Chicago White Stockings	67	65	.508	19	37‍–‍30	30‍–‍35
Philadelphia Quakers	63	64	.496	20½	43‍–‍24	20‍–‍40
Pittsburgh Alleghenys	61	71	.462	25	40‍–‍28	21‍–‍43
Cleveland Spiders	61	72	.459	25½	33‍–‍35	28‍–‍37
Indianapolis Hoosiers	59	75	.440	28	32‍–‍36	27‍–‍39
Washington Nationals	41	83	.331	41	24‍–‍29	17‍–‍54

=== Tie games ===
26 tie games (13 in AA, 13 in NL), which are not factored into winning percentage or games behind (and were often replayed again), occurred throughout the season.

==== American Association ====
- Baltimore Orioles, 4
- Brooklyn Bridegrooms, 3
- Cincinnati Red Stockings, 12
- Columbus Solons, 2
- Kansas City Cowboys, 2
- Louisville Colonels, 2
- Philadelphia Athletics, 5
- St. Louis Browns, 6

==== National League ====
- Boston Beaneaters, 5
- Chicago White Stockings, 4
- Cleveland Spiders, 3
- Indianapolis Hoosiers, 1
- New York Giants, 5
- Philadelphia Quakers, 3
- Pittsburgh Alleghenys, 2
- Washington Nationals, 3

== Postseason ==
=== Bracket ===
World's Championship Series
AA	Brooklyn Bridegrooms	12	2	8^{8}	10^{6}	3	1	7	7	2
NL	New York Giants	10	6	7	7	11	2^{11}	11	16	3

== Managerial changes ==
=== Off-season ===
Team	Former Manager	New Manager
Boston Beaneaters	John Morrill	Jim Hart
Detroit Wolverines	Robert Leadley	Team folded
Indianapolis Hoosiers	Harry Spence	Jack Glasscock
Louisville Colonels	John Kerins	Dude Esterbrook
Washington Nationals	Ted Sullivan	John Morrill

=== In-season ===
Team	Former Manager	New Manager
Indianapolis Hoosiers	Jack Glasscock	Frank Bancroft
Louisville Colonels	Dude Esterbrook	Jimmy Wolf
Louisville Colonels	Jimmy Wolf	Dan Shannon
Louisville Colonels	Dan Shannon	Jack Chapman
Pittsburgh Pirates	Horrace Phillips	Fred Dunlap
Pittsburgh Pirates	Fred Dunlap	Ned Hanlon
Washington Statesmen	John Morrill	Arthur Irwin

== League leaders ==
Any team shown in small text indicates a previous team a player was on during the season.

=== American Association ===
Hitting leaders
Stat	Player	Total
AVG	Tommy Tucker (BAL)	.372
OPS	Tommy Tucker (BAL)	.934
HR	Bug Holliday (CIN); Harry Stovey (PHA)	19
RBI	Harry Stovey (PHA)	119
R	Mike Griffin (BAL); Harry Stovey (PHA)	152
H	Tommy Tucker (BAL)	196
SB	Billy Hamilton (KC)	111

Pitching leaders
Stat	Player	Total
W	Bob Caruthers (BRO)	40
L	Mark Baldwin (COL)	34
ERA	Jack Stivetts (STL)	2.25
K	Mark Baldwin (COL)	368
IP	Mark Baldwin (COL)	513.2
SV	Tony Mullane (CIN)	5
WHIP	Jack Stivetts (STL)	1.153

=== National League ===
Hitting leaders
Stat	Player	Total
AVG	Dan Brouthers (BSN)	.373
OPS	Fred Carroll (PIT)	.970
HR	Sam Thompson (PHI)	20
RBI	Roger Connor (NYG)	130
R	Mike Tiernan (NYG)	147
H	Jack Glasscock (IND)	205
SB	Jim Fogarty (PHI)	99

Pitching leaders
Stat	Player	Total
W	John Clarkson^{1} (BSN)	49
L	Harry Staley (PIT)	26
ERA	John Clarkson^{1} (BSN)	2.73
K	John Clarkson^{1} (BSN)	284
IP	John Clarkson (BSN)	620.0
SV	Bill Sowders (PIT/BSN)	3
WHIP	John Clarkson (BSN)	1.277

^{1} National League Triple Crown pitching winner

== Milestones ==
=== Batters ===
==== Cycles ====
- Pete Browning (LOU):
  - Browning hit for his second cycle and second in franchise history, on June 7 against the Philadelphia Athletics.
- Jack Glasscock (IND):
  - Glasscock hit for his first cycle and first in franchise history, on August 8 against the New York Giants.
- Larry Twitchell (CLE):
  - Twitchell hit for his first cycle and first in franchise history, on August 15 against the Boston Beaneaters.

==== Other batting accomplishments ====
- Charlie Reilly (COL):
  - Became the first player to hit two home runs in his Major League debut on October 9 against the Philadelphia Athletics.

=== Miscellaneous ===
- Louisville Colonels:
  - Set a Major League record for highest losing streak at 26, beginning with a defeat against the Baltimore Orioles on May 22 and ending on June 23 with a victory over the St. Louis Browns.
- Cleveland Spiders:
  - Set a major league record for most runs scored in the third inning, by scoring 14 runs against the Washington Senators on August 7.

== Venues ==
The Columbus Solons join the American Association and play at Recreation Park in Columbus, Ohio.

Following their eviction from the original Polo Grounds in New York, New York over the offseason, the New York Giants would play at several ballparks while waiting for their next home further uptown, also called the Polo Grounds, to finish construction. The team would play at Oakland Park in Jersey City, New Jersey for two games on April 24 and 25, before beginning play at the St. George Cricket Grounds in St. George, New York, the former home of the New York Metropolitans, where they played from April 29 through June 14. Following a road trip, the team would begin play at the new Polo Grounds on July 8.

A fire at Washington Park, home of the Brooklyn Bridegrooms occurred on May 17 while the team was on a road trip. The burnt down grandstand and fencing were rebuilt in time for the team to play their next scheduled home game, on May 30.

Two teams of the American Association hosted Sunday games:

- Brooklyn Bridegrooms played 14 games at Ridgewood Park in Ridgewood, New York on May 5, June 2, 9, 16, 23, July 21, 28, August 4, September 8, a doubleheader on September 15, September 22, 29, and October 6. It would be the last of three seasons that the team played Sunday games there, as they joined the National League (which forbid Sunday baseball) the following season.
- Philadelphia Athletics played 14 games at Gloucester Point Grounds in Gloucester City, New Jersey on April 21, May 26, June 2, 9, 16, 23, 30, August 4, September 1, 8, 15, 22, 29, and October 13.

== See also ==
- 1889 in baseball (Events, Births, Deaths)
