= 1889 Pittsburgh Alleghenys season =

1889 Pittsburgh Alleghenys
- League: National League
- Ballpark: Recreation Park
- City: Allegheny, Pennsylvania
- Record: 61–71 (.462)
- League place: 5th
- Owner: William A. Nimick
- Managers: Horace B. Phillips, Fred Dunlap, Ned Hanlon

The 1889 Pittsburgh Alleghenys season was the eighth season of the Pittsburgh Alleghenys franchise and their third in the National League. The Alleghenys finished fifth in the league standings with a record of 61–71.

== Regular season ==
=== Season standings ===
National League
Team	W	L	Pct.	GB	Home	Road
New York Giants	83	43	.659	—	47‍–‍15	36‍–‍28
Boston Beaneaters	83	45	.648	1	48‍–‍17	35‍–‍28
Chicago White Stockings	67	65	.508	19	37‍–‍30	30‍–‍35
Philadelphia Quakers	63	64	.496	20½	43‍–‍24	20‍–‍40
Pittsburgh Alleghenys	61	71	.462	25	40‍–‍28	21‍–‍43
Cleveland Spiders	61	72	.459	25½	33‍–‍35	28‍–‍37
Indianapolis Hoosiers	59	75	.440	28	32‍–‍36	27‍–‍39
Washington Nationals	41	83	.331	41	24‍–‍29	17‍–‍54

=== Record vs. opponents ===
1889 National League record Sources:
Team	BSN	CHI	CLE	IND	NYG	PHI	PIT	WAS
Boston	—	10–7–1	12–8–1	10–10	8–6–2	13–6	16–3	14–5–1
Chicago	7–10–1	—	11–9	13–7	5–13–1	9–10–1	10–9–1	12–7
Cleveland	8–12–1	9–11	—	9–10–1	4–14	10–9	7–13	14–3–1
Indianapolis	10–10	7–13	10–9–1	—	7–13	4–13	10–10	11–7
New York	6–8–2	13–5–1	14–4	13–7	—	12–7–1	12–7–1	13–5
Philadelphia	6–13	10–9–1	9–10	13–4	7–12–1	—	9–9	9–7–1
Pittsburgh	3–16	9–10–1	13–7	10–10	7–12–1	9–9	—	10–7
Washington	5–14–1	7–12	3–14–1	7–11	5–13	7–9–1	7–10	—

=== Roster ===
1889 Pittsburgh Alleghenys
Roster
Pitchers: Alex Beam; Pete Conway; Andy Dunning; Pud Galvin; Bill Garfield; Alex Jones; Al Krumm; Ed Morris; Bill Sowders; Harry Staley	Catchers: Fred Carroll; Chuck Lauer; Doggie Miller; Infielders: Jake Beckley; Fred Dunlap; Bill Kuehne; Pop Smith; Deacon White	Outfielders: Jocko Fields; Ned Hanlon; Al Maul; Jack Rowe; Billy Sunday	Manager: Fred Dunlap; Ned Hanlon; Horace B. Phillips

== Player stats ==
=== Batting ===
==== Starters by position ====
Note: Pos = Position; G = Games played; AB = At bats; H = Hits; Avg. = Batting average; HR = Home runs; RBI = Runs batted in

Pos	Player	G	AB	H	Avg.	HR	RBI
C	Doggie Miller	104	422	113	.268	6	56
1B	Jake Beckley	123	522	157	.301	9	97
2B	Fred Dunlap	121	451	106	.235	2	65
SS	Jack Rowe	75	317	82	.259	2	32
3B	Bill Kuehne	97	390	96	.246	5	57
OF	Al Maul	68	257	71	.276	4	44
OF	Ned Hanlon	116	461	110	.239	2	37
OF	Billy Sunday	81	321	77	.240	2	25

==== Other batters ====
Note: G = Games played; AB = At bats; H = Hits; Avg. = Batting average; HR = Home runs; RBI = Runs batted in

Player	G	AB	H	Avg.	HR	RBI
Fred Carroll	91	318	105	.330	2	51
Jocko Fields	75	289	90	.311	2	43
Pop Smith	72	258	54	.209	5	27
Deacon White	55	225	57	.253	0	26
Chuck Lauer	4	16	3	.188	0	1

=== Pitching ===
==== Starting pitchers ====
Note: G = Games pitched; IP = Innings pitched; W = Wins; L = Losses; ERA = Earned run average; SO = Strikeouts

Player	G	IP	W	L	ERA	SO
Harry Staley	49	420.0	21	26	3.51	159
Pud Galvin	41	341.0	23	16	4.17	77
Ed Morris	21	170.0	6	13	4.13	40
Pete Conway	3	22.0	2	1	4.91	2
Alex Beam	2	18.0	1	1	6.50	1
Andy Dunning	2	18.0	0	2	7.00	4
Alex Jones	1	9.0	1	0	3.00	10
Al Krumm	1	9.0	0	1	10.00	4

==== Other pitchers ====
Note: G = Games pitched; IP = Innings pitched; W = Wins; L = Losses; ERA = Earned run average; SO = Strikeouts

Player	G	IP	W	L	ERA	SO
Bill Sowders	13	52.2	6	5	7.35	33
Al Maul	6	42.0	1	4	9.86	11
Bill Garfield	4	29.0	0	2	7.76	4
