= 1889 New York Giants season =

1889 New York Giants
- World Series champions National League champions
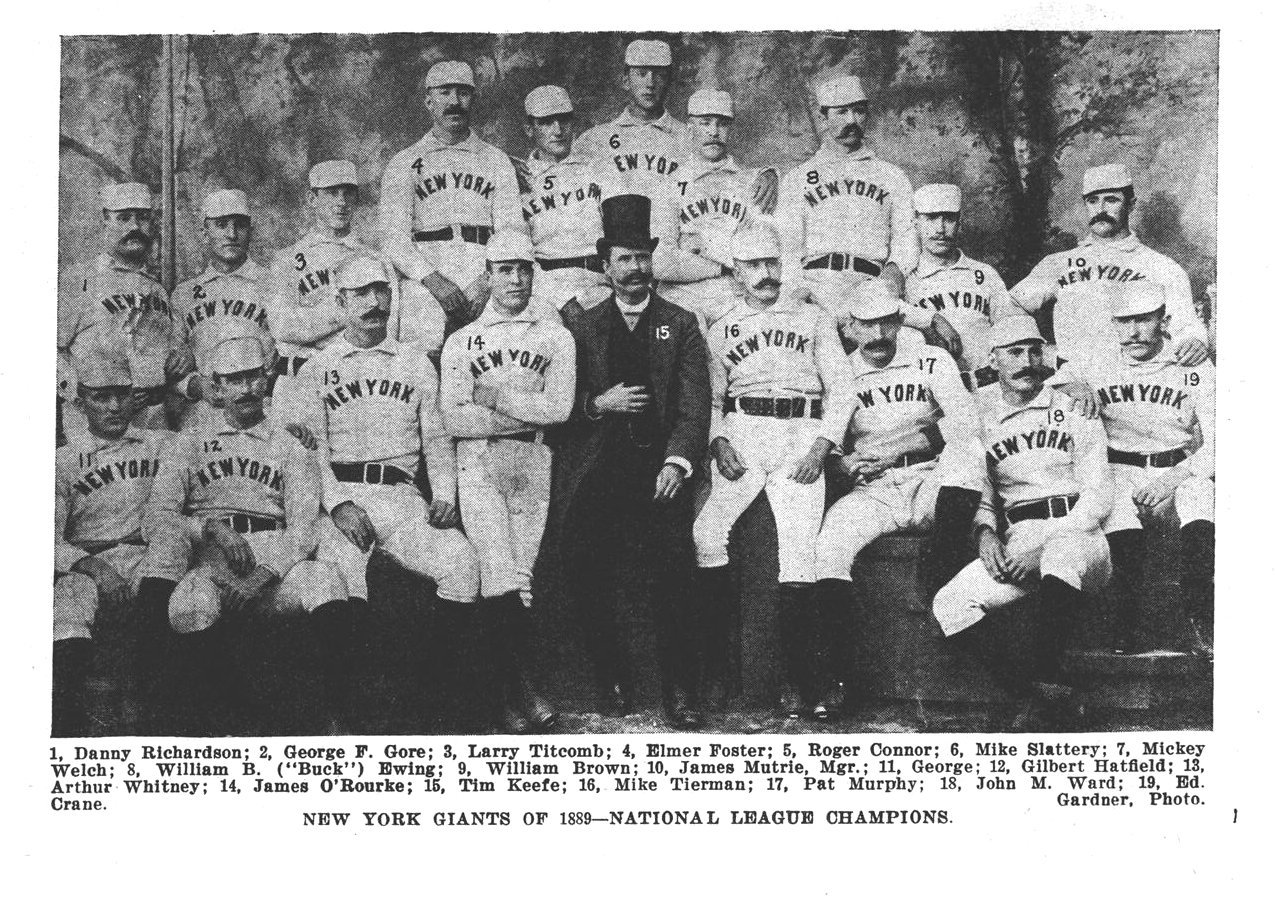
- League: National League
- Ballpark: Oakland Park (2 games); St. George Cricket Grounds (23 games); Polo Grounds (38 games)
- City: New York City
- Record: 83–43 (.659)
- Divisional place: 1st
- Owners: John B. Day
- Managers: Jim Mutrie

The 1889 New York Giants season was the franchise's seventh season. The team finished first in the National League with a record of 83–43. They beat the Boston Beaneaters by just one game. The Beaneaters won the same number of games as the Giants, but lost two more games, giving the pennant to the Giants. The Giants went on to face the American Association champion Brooklyn Bridegrooms in the World Series, winning six games to three. The series marked the first meeting between the Giants and the team that would become the Dodgers, a rivalry that continues to this day.

In the opening series of the season on April 24–25, the Giants hosted a two-game series against the Boston Beaneaters in Oakland Park, Jersey City, New Jersey, before playing the rest of April, May, and June at the St. George Cricket Grounds (of the former New York Metropolitans) in the then-new community of St. George on Staten Island. From July on, following a lengthy road trip, the Giants played at the newly relocated Polo Grounds.

== Regular season ==
=== Season standings ===
National League
Team	W	L	Pct.	GB	Home	Road
New York Giants	83	43	.659	—	47‍–‍15	36‍–‍28
Boston Beaneaters	83	45	.648	1	48‍–‍17	35‍–‍28
Chicago White Stockings	67	65	.508	19	37‍–‍30	30‍–‍35
Philadelphia Quakers	63	64	.496	20½	43‍–‍24	20‍–‍40
Pittsburgh Alleghenys	61	71	.462	25	40‍–‍28	21‍–‍43
Cleveland Spiders	61	72	.459	25½	33‍–‍35	28‍–‍37
Indianapolis Hoosiers	59	75	.440	28	32‍–‍36	27‍–‍39
Washington Nationals	41	83	.331	41	24‍–‍29	17‍–‍54

=== Record vs. opponents ===
1889 National League record Sources:
Team	BSN	CHI	CLE	IND	NYG	PHI	PIT	WAS
Boston	—	10–7–1	12–8–1	10–10	8–6–2	13–6	16–3	14–5–1
Chicago	7–10–1	—	11–9	13–7	5–13–1	9–10–1	10–9–1	12–7
Cleveland	8–12–1	9–11	—	9–10–1	4–14	10–9	7–13	14–3–1
Indianapolis	10–10	7–13	10–9–1	—	7–13	4–13	10–10	11–7
New York	6–8–2	13–5–1	14–4	13–7	—	12–7–1	12–7–1	13–5
Philadelphia	6–13	10–9–1	9–10	13–4	7–12–1	—	9–9	9–7–1
Pittsburgh	3–16	9–10–1	13–7	10–10	7–12–1	9–9	—	10–7
Washington	5–14–1	7–12	3–14–1	7–11	5–13	7–9–1	7–10	—

=== Roster ===
1889 New York Giants
Roster
Pitchers: Ed Crane; Tim Keefe; Hank O'Day; Ledell Titcomb; Mickey Welch	Catchers: William Brown; Buck Ewing; Pat Murphy; Infielders: Roger Connor; Gil Hatfield; Danny Richardson; John Ward; Art Whitney	Outfielders: Elmer Foster; Bill George; George Gore; Harry Lyons; Jim O'Rourke; Mike Slattery; Mike Tiernan	Manager: Jim Mutrie

== Player stats ==
=== Batting ===
==== Starters by position ====
Note: Pos = Position; G = Games played; AB = At bats; H = Hits; Avg. = Batting average; HR = Home runs; RBI = Runs batted in

Pos	Player	G	AB	H	Avg.	HR	RBI
C	Buck Ewing	99	407	133	.327	4	87
1B	Roger Connor	131	496	157	.317	13	130
2B	Danny Richardson	125	497	139	.280	7	100
SS	John Ward	114	479	143	.299	1	67
3B	Art Whitney	129	473	103	.218	1	59
OF	George Gore	120	488	149	.305	7	54
OF	Jim O'Rourke	128	502	161	.321	3	81
OF	Mike Tiernan	122	499	167	.335	10	73

==== Other batters ====
Note: G = Games played; AB = At bats; H = Hits; Avg. = Batting average; HR = Home runs; RBI = Runs batted in

Player	G	AB	H	Avg.	HR	RBI
William Brown	40	139	36	.259	1	29
Gil Hatfield	32	125	23	.184	1	12
Mike Slattery	12	48	14	.292	1	12
Pat Murphy	9	28	10	.357	1	4
Harry Lyons	5	20	2	.100	0	2
Bill George	3	15	4	.267	0	0
Elmer Foster	2	4	0	.000	0	0

=== Pitching ===
==== Starting pitchers ====
Note: G = Games pitched; IP = Innings pitched; W = Wins; L = Losses; ERA = Earned run average; SO = Strikeouts

Player	G	IP	W	L	ERA	SO
Mickey Welch	45	375.0	27	12	3.02	125
Tim Keefe	47	364.0	28	13	3.36	225
Ed Crane	29	230.0	14	10	3.68	130
Hank O'Day	10	78.0	9	1	4.27	28
Gil Hatfield	6	52.0	2	4	3.98	28
Ledell Titcomb	3	26.0	1	2	6.58	7

==== Other pitchers ====
Note: G = Games pitched; IP = Innings pitched; W = Wins; L = Losses; ERA = Earned run average; SO = Strikeouts

Player	G	IP	W	L	ERA	SO
Buck Ewing	3	20.0	2	0	4.05	12

==== Relief pitchers ====
Note: G = Games pitched; W = Wins; L = Losses; SV = Saves; ERA = Earned run average; SO = Strikeouts

Player	G	W	L	SV	ERA	SO
Art Whitney	1	0	0	0	2.08	3

== 1889 World Series ==
The Giants beat the Brooklyn Bridegrooms six games to three in the World Series.
