= Bill Garfield =

American baseball player (1867–1941)

- Pitcher
- Born: October 26, 1867; Sheffield, Ohio
- Died: December 16, 1941 (aged 74); Danville, Illinois
- Batted: Right Threw: Right

MLB debut
- July 10, 1889, for the Pittsburgh Alleghenys

Last MLB appearance
- August 6, 1890, for the Cleveland Spiders

MLB statistics
- Win–loss record: 1-9
- Earned run average: 5.73
- Strikeouts: 20

Teams
- Pittsburgh Alleghenys (1889); Cleveland Spiders (1890)

William Milton Garfield (October 26, 1867 – December 16, 1941) was a pitcher in Major League Baseball who played for the Pittsburgh Alleghenys in 1889 and the Cleveland Spiders in 1890. Listed at 5' 11.5", 160 lb., Garfield batted and threw right-handed. He was born in Sheffield, Ohio.

In a two-season career, Garfield posted a 1-9 record with a 5.73 ERA in 13 appearances, including nine complete games, giving up 99 runs (63 earned) on 136 hits and 52 walks while striking out 29 in 99 innings of work.

Garfield died in Danville, Illinois, at the age of 74.

== See also ==
- 1889 Pittsburgh Alleghenys season
- 1890 Cleveland Spiders season
