= 1889 Chicago White Stockings season =

1889 Chicago White Stockings
- League: National League
- Ballpark: West Side Park
- City: Chicago
- Record: 67–65 (.508)
- League place: 3rd
- Owner: Albert Spalding
- Manager: Cap Anson

The 1889 Chicago White Stockings season was the 18th season of the Chicago White Stockings franchise, the 14th in the National League, and the fifth at the first West Side Park. The White Stockings finished third in the National League with a record of 67–65.

== Regular season ==
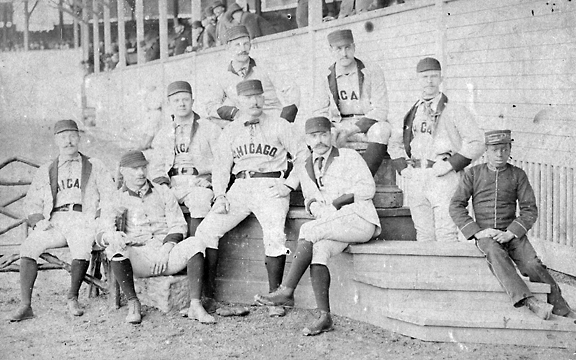
1889 Chicago White Stockings

=== Season standings ===
National League
Team	W	L	Pct.	GB	Home	Road
New York Giants	83	43	.659	—	47‍–‍15	36‍–‍28
Boston Beaneaters	83	45	.648	1	48‍–‍17	35‍–‍28
Chicago White Stockings	67	65	.508	19	37‍–‍30	30‍–‍35
Philadelphia Quakers	63	64	.496	20½	43‍–‍24	20‍–‍40
Pittsburgh Alleghenys	61	71	.462	25	40‍–‍28	21‍–‍43
Cleveland Spiders	61	72	.459	25½	33‍–‍35	28‍–‍37
Indianapolis Hoosiers	59	75	.440	28	32‍–‍36	27‍–‍39
Washington Nationals	41	83	.331	41	24‍–‍29	17‍–‍54

=== Record vs. opponents ===
1889 National League record Sources:
Team	BSN	CHI	CLE	IND	NYG	PHI	PIT	WAS
Boston	—	10–7–1	12–8–1	10–10	8–6–2	13–6	16–3	14–5–1
Chicago	7–10–1	—	11–9	13–7	5–13–1	9–10–1	10–9–1	12–7
Cleveland	8–12–1	9–11	—	9–10–1	4–14	10–9	7–13	14–3–1
Indianapolis	10–10	7–13	10–9–1	—	7–13	4–13	10–10	11–7
New York	6–8–2	13–5–1	14–4	13–7	—	12–7–1	12–7–1	13–5
Philadelphia	6–13	10–9–1	9–10	13–4	7–12–1	—	9–9	9–7–1
Pittsburgh	3–16	9–10–1	13–7	10–10	7–12–1	9–9	—	10–7
Washington	5–14–1	7–12	3–14–1	7–11	5–13	7–9–1	7–10	—

=== Roster ===
1889 Chicago White Stockings
Roster
Pitchers: Bill Bishop; Frank Dwyer; Ad Gumbert; Egyptian Healy; Bill Hutchison; Gus Krock; John Tener	Catchers: Dell Darling; Duke Farrell; Silver Flint; Andy Sommers; Infielders: Cap Anson; Charlie Bastian; Tom Burns; Fred Pfeffer; Ned Williamson	Outfielders: Hugh Duffy; Jimmy Ryan; George Van Haltren	Manager: Cap Anson

== Player stats ==
=== Batting ===
==== Starters by position ====
Note: Pos = Position; G = Games played; AB = At bats; H = Hits; Avg. = Batting average; HR = Home runs; RBI = Runs batted in

Pos	Player	G	AB	H	Avg.	HR	RBI
C	Duke Farrell	101	407	107	.263	11	75
1B	Cap Anson	134	518	161	.311	7	117
2B	Fred Pfeffer	134	531	128	.241	7	77
SS	Ned Williamson	47	173	41	.237	1	30
3B	Tom Burns	136	525	135	.257	4	66
OF	Hugh Duffy	136	584	182	.312	12	89
OF	George Van Haltren	134	543	175	.322	9	81
OF	Jimmy Ryan	135	576	187	.325	17	72

==== Other batters ====
Note: G = Games played; AB = At bats; H = Hits; Avg. = Batting average; HR = Home runs; RBI = Runs batted in

Player	G	AB	H	Avg.	HR	RBI
Charlie Bastian	46	155	21	.135	0	10
Dell Darling	36	120	23	.192	0	7
Silver Flint	15	56	13	.232	1	9
Andy Sommers	12	45	10	.222	0	8

=== Pitching ===
==== Starting pitchers ====
Note: G = Games pitched; IP = Innings pitched; W = Wins; L = Losses; ERA = Earned run average; SO = Strikeouts

Player	G	IP	W	L	ERA	SO
Bill Hutchison	37	318.0	16	17	3.54	136
John Tener	35	287.0	15	15	3.64	105
Frank Dwyer	32	276.0	16	13	3.59	63
Ad Gumbert	31	246.1	16	13	3.62	91
Gus Krock	7	60.2	3	3	4.90	16
Egyptian Healy	5	46.0	1	4	4.50	22

==== Relief pitchers ====
Note: G = Games pitched; W = Wins; L = Losses; SV = Saves; ERA = Earned run average; SO = Strikeouts

Player	G	W	L	SV	ERA	SO
Bill Bishop	2	0	0	2	18.00	1
