= 1889 Cleveland Spiders season =

1889 Cleveland Spiders
- League: National League
- Ballpark: National League Park
- City: Cleveland, Ohio
- Record: 61–72 (.459)
- League place: 6th
- Owner: Frank Robison
- Manager: Tom Loftus

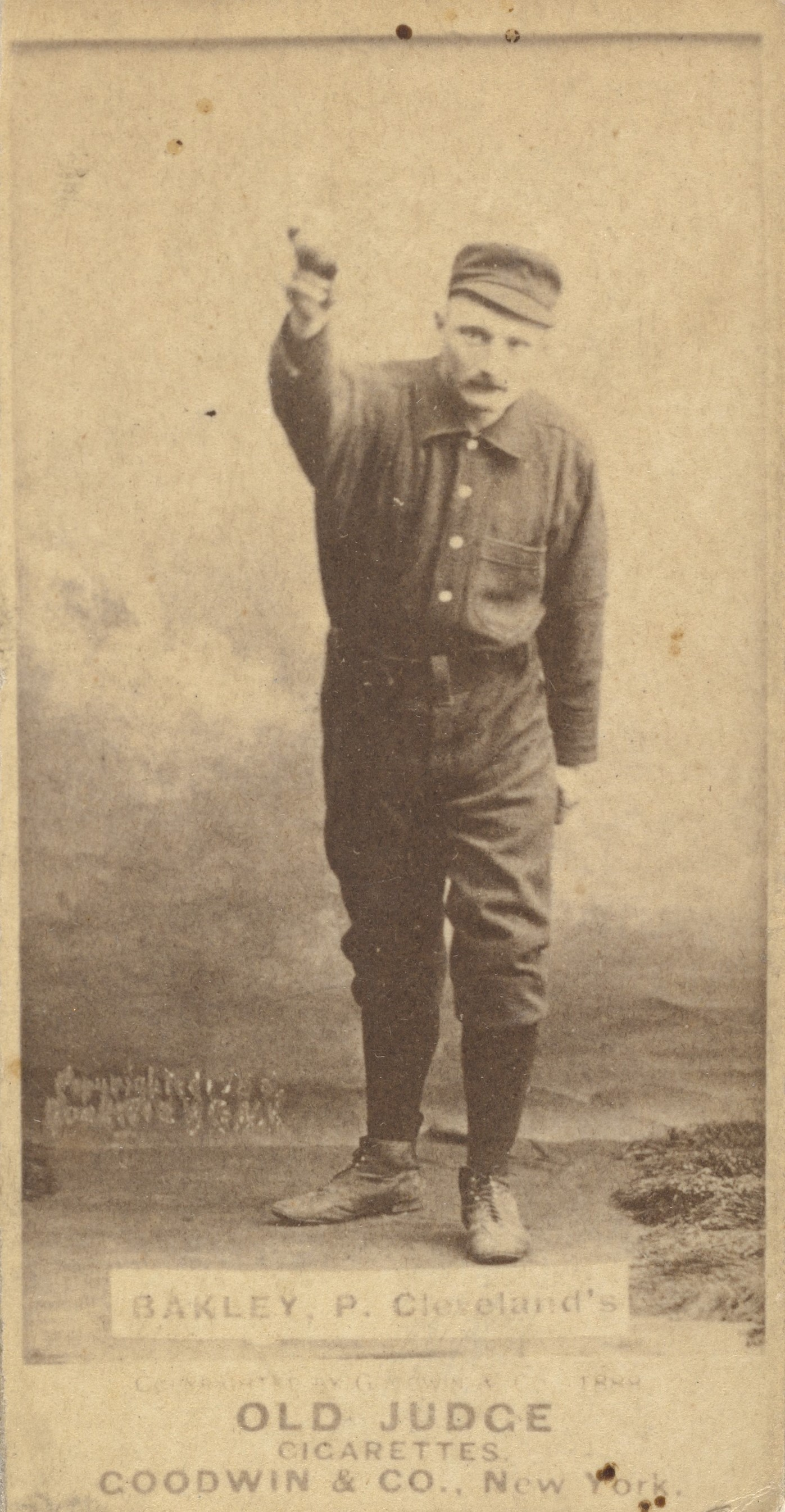
Pitcher Jersey Bakley

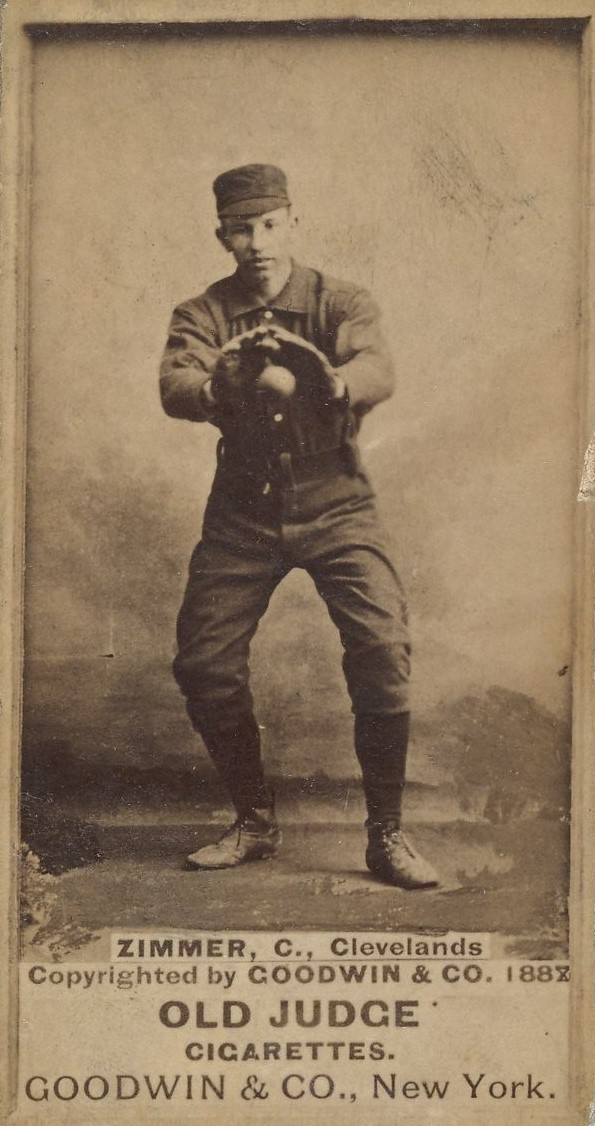
Catcher Chief Zimmer

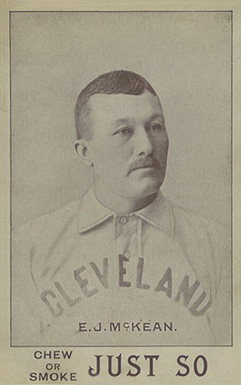
Shortstop Ed McKean

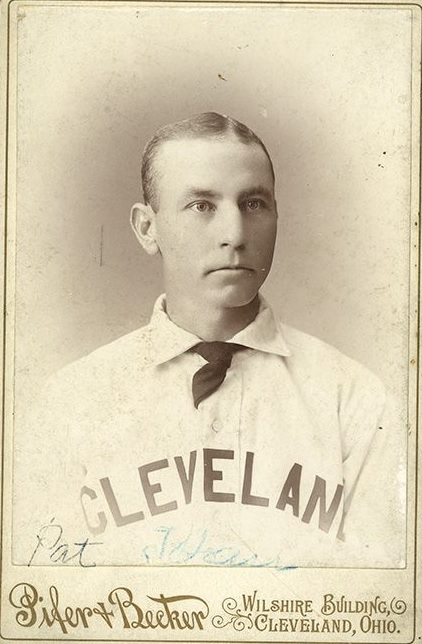
Third baseman Patsy Tebeau

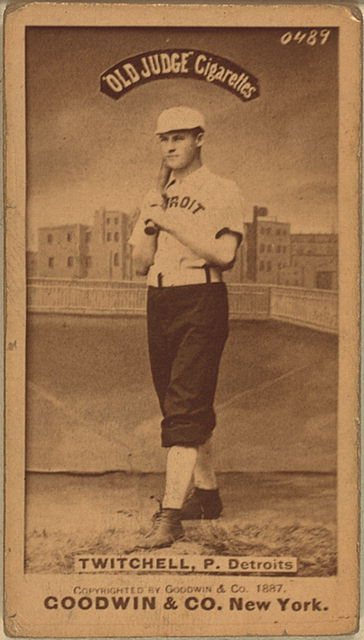
Left fielder Larry Twitchell

Before the 1889 season, the Cleveland Blues switched from the American Association to the National League. They also earned a new nickname, the Cleveland Spiders, because so many of their players were very thin. They finished their first season in the National League with a 61–72 record, good enough for sixth place.

== Regular season ==
=== Season standings ===
National League
Team	W	L	Pct.	GB	Home	Road
New York Giants	83	43	.659	—	47‍–‍15	36‍–‍28
Boston Beaneaters	83	45	.648	1	48‍–‍17	35‍–‍28
Chicago White Stockings	67	65	.508	19	37‍–‍30	30‍–‍35
Philadelphia Quakers	63	64	.496	20½	43‍–‍24	20‍–‍40
Pittsburgh Alleghenys	61	71	.462	25	40‍–‍28	21‍–‍43
Cleveland Spiders	61	72	.459	25½	33‍–‍35	28‍–‍37
Indianapolis Hoosiers	59	75	.440	28	32‍–‍36	27‍–‍39
Washington Nationals	41	83	.331	41	24‍–‍29	17‍–‍54

=== Record vs. opponents ===
1889 National League record Sources:
Team	BSN	CHI	CLE	IND	NYG	PHI	PIT	WAS
Boston	—	10–7–1	12–8–1	10–10	8–6–2	13–6	16–3	14–5–1
Chicago	7–10–1	—	11–9	13–7	5–13–1	9–10–1	10–9–1	12–7
Cleveland	8–12–1	9–11	—	9–10–1	4–14	10–9	7–13	14–3–1
Indianapolis	10–10	7–13	10–9–1	—	7–13	4–13	10–10	11–7
New York	6–8–2	13–5–1	14–4	13–7	—	12–7–1	12–7–1	13–5
Philadelphia	6–13	10–9–1	9–10	13–4	7–12–1	—	9–9	9–7–1
Pittsburgh	3–16	9–10–1	13–7	10–10	7–12–1	9–9	—	10–7
Washington	5–14–1	7–12	3–14–1	7–11	5–13	7–9–1	7–10	—

=== Roster ===
1889 Cleveland Spiders
Roster
Pitchers: Jersey Bakley; Ed Beatin; Henry Gruber; Cinders O'Brien; Charlie Sprague	Catchers: Pop Snyder; Sy Sutcliffe; Chief Zimmer; Infielders: Jay Faatz; Ed McKean; Cub Stricker; Patsy Tebeau	Outfielders: Bob Gilks; Jimmy McAleer; Paul Radford; Larry Twitchell	Manager: Tom Loftus

== Player stats ==
=== Batting ===
==== Starters by position ====
Note: Pos = Position; G = Games played; AB = At bats; H = Hits; Avg. = Batting average; HR = Home runs; RBI = Runs batted in

Pos	Player	G	AB	H	Avg.	HR	RBI
C	Charles Zimmer	84	259	67	.259	1	21
1B	Jay Faatz	117	442	102	.231	2	38
2B	Cub Stricker	136	566	142	.251	1	47
SS	Ed McKean	123	500	159	.318	5	75
3B	Patsy Tebeau	136	521	147	.282	8	76
OF	Jimmy McAleer	110	447	105	.235	0	35
OF	Paul Radford	136	487	116	.238	1	46
OF	Larry Twitchell	134	549	151	.275	4	95

==== Other batters ====
Note: G = Games played; AB = At bats; H = Hits; Avg. = Batting average; HR = Home runs; RBI = Runs batted in

Player	G	AB	H	Avg.	HR	RBI
Bob Gilks	53	210	50	.238	0	18
Sy Sutcliffe	46	161	40	.248	1	21
Pop Snyder	22	83	16	.193	0	12

=== Pitching ===
==== Starting pitchers ====
Note: G = Games pitched; IP = Innings pitched; W = Wins; L = Losses; ERA = Earned run average; SO = Strikeouts

Player	G	IP	W	L	ERA	SO
Cinders O'Brien	41	346.2	22	17	4.15	122
Ed Beatin	36	317.2	20	15	3.57	126
Jersey Bakley	36	304.1	12	22	2.96	105
Henry Gruber	25	205.0	7	16	3.64	74
Charlie Sprague	2	17.0	0	2	8.47	8

==== Relief pitchers ====
Note: G = Games pitched; W = Wins; L = Losses; SV = Saves; ERA = Earned run average; SO = Strikeouts

Player	G	W	L	SV	ERA	SO
Larry Twitchell	1	0	0	0	0.00	0
