= 1889 Philadelphia Quakers season =

National League season

1889 Philadelphia Quakers
- League: National League
- Ballpark: Philadelphia Base Ball Grounds
- City: Philadelphia, Pennsylvania
- Record: 63–64 (.496)
- League place: 4th
- Owners: Al Reach, John Rogers
- Manager: Harry Wright

== Regular season ==
=== Season standings ===
National League
Team	W	L	Pct.	GB	Home	Road
New York Giants	83	43	.659	—	47‍–‍15	36‍–‍28
Boston Beaneaters	83	45	.648	1	48‍–‍17	35‍–‍28
Chicago White Stockings	67	65	.508	19	37‍–‍30	30‍–‍35
Philadelphia Quakers	63	64	.496	20½	43‍–‍24	20‍–‍40
Pittsburgh Alleghenys	61	71	.462	25	40‍–‍28	21‍–‍43
Cleveland Spiders	61	72	.459	25½	33‍–‍35	28‍–‍37
Indianapolis Hoosiers	59	75	.440	28	32‍–‍36	27‍–‍39
Washington Nationals	41	83	.331	41	24‍–‍29	17‍–‍54

=== Record vs. opponents ===
1889 National League record Sources:
Team	BSN	CHI	CLE	IND	NYG	PHI	PIT	WAS
Boston	—	10–7–1	12–8–1	10–10	8–6–2	13–6	16–3	14–5–1
Chicago	7–10–1	—	11–9	13–7	5–13–1	9–10–1	10–9–1	12–7
Cleveland	8–12–1	9–11	—	9–10–1	4–14	10–9	7–13	14–3–1
Indianapolis	10–10	7–13	10–9–1	—	7–13	4–13	10–10	11–7
New York	6–8–2	13–5–1	14–4	13–7	—	12–7–1	12–7–1	13–5
Philadelphia	6–13	10–9–1	9–10	13–4	7–12–1	—	9–9	9–7–1
Pittsburgh	3–16	9–10–1	13–7	10–10	7–12–1	9–9	—	10–7
Washington	5–14–1	7–12	3–14–1	7–11	5–13	7–9–1	7–10	—

=== Roster ===
1889 Philadelphia Quakers
Roster
Pitchers: Dave Anderson; Charlie Buffinton; Dan Casey; Bill Day; Kid Gleason; Ben Sanders; Pete Wood	Catchers: Jack Clements; Pop Schriver; Infielders: Harry Decker; Sid Farrar; Bill Hallman; Arthur Irwin; Joe Mulvey; Al Myers; Piggy Ward	Outfielders: Ed Andrews; Ed Delahanty; Jim Fogarty; Sam Thompson; George Wood	Manager: Harry Wright

== Player stats ==
=== Batting ===
==== Starters by position ====
Note: Pos = Position; G = Games played; AB = At bats; H = Hits; Avg. = Batting average; HR = Home runs; RBI = Runs batted in

Pos	Player	G	AB	H	Avg.	HR	RBI
C	Jack Clements	78	310	88	.284	4	35
1B	Sid Farrar	130	477	128	.268	3	58
2B	Al Myers	75	305	82	.269	0	28
SS	Bill Hallman	119	462	117	.253	2	60
3B	Joe Mulvey	129	544	157	.289	6	77
OF	Jim Fogarty	128	499	129	.259	3	54
OF	Sam Thompson	128	533	158	.296	20	111
OF	George Wood	97	422	106	.251	5	53

==== Other batters ====
Note: G = Games played; AB = At bats; H = Hits; Avg. = Batting average; HR = Home runs; RBI = Runs batted in

Player	G	AB	H	Avg.	HR	RBI
Ed Delahanty	56	246	72	.293	0	27
Pop Schriver	55	211	56	.265	1	19
Arthur Irwin	18	73	16	.219	0	10
Ed Andrews	10	39	11	.282	0	7
Harry Decker	11	30	3	.100	0	2
Piggy Ward	7	25	4	.160	0	4

=== Pitching ===
==== Starting pitchers ====
Note: G = Games pitched; IP = Innings pitched; W = Wins; L = Losses; ERA = Earned run average; SO = Strikeouts

Player	G	IP	W	L	ERA	SO
Charlie Buffinton	47	380.0	28	16	3.24	153
Ben Sanders	44	349.2	19	18	3.55	123
Kid Gleason	29	205.0	9	15	5.58	64
Dan Casey	20	152.2	6	10	3.77	65
Bill Day	4	19.0	0	3	5.21	20

==== Other pitchers ====
Note: G = Games pitched; IP = Innings pitched; W = Wins; L = Losses; ERA = Earned run average; SO = Strikeouts

Player	G	IP	W	L	ERA	SO
Dave Anderson	5	23.0	0	1	7.43	8
Pete Wood	3	19.0	1	1	5.21	8

==== Relief pitchers ====
Note: G = Games pitched; W = Wins; L = Losses; SV = Saves; ERA = Earned run average; SO = Strikeouts

Player	G	W	L	SV	ERA	SO
Jim Fogarty	4	0	0	0	9.00	0
George Wood	1	0	0	0	18.00	2
