= Jim Banning =

American baseball player (1865–1952)

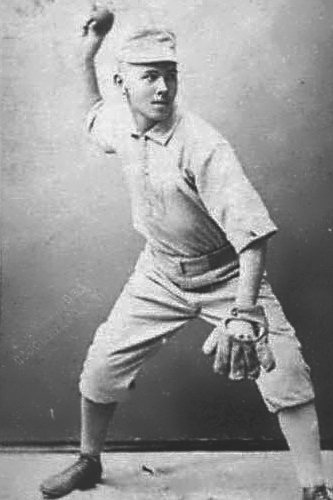
- Catcher
- Born: June 11, 1865; New York, New York, U.S.
- Died: October 14, 1952 (aged 87); St. Paul, Minnesota, U.S.
- Batted: Left Threw: Right

MLB debut
- September 27, 1888, for the Washington Nationals

Last MLB appearance
- May 11, 1889, for the Washington Nationals

MLB statistics
- Batting average: .000
- Home runs: 0
- Runs scored: 0
- Stats at Baseball Reference

Teams
- Washington Nationals (1888–1889)

James M. Banning (June 11, 1865 – October 14, 1952) was an American catcher in Major League Baseball in the 19th century. He played for the Washington Nationals of the National League. He appeared in one game in 1888 and two games in 1889 for the Nationals. Banning's minor league career included stints with the Fargo, ND teams of the Red River Valley League in both the 1887 and 1897 seasons. He also appeared in a 25-inning contest for Fargo against Grand Forks, ND in 1891.

== Sources ==
- Career statistics from Baseball Reference · Baseball Reference (Minors) · Retrosheet · Baseball Almanac
