= 1889 Boston Beaneaters season =

1889 Boston Beaneaters
- League: National League
- Ballpark: South End Grounds
- City: Boston, Massachusetts
- Record: 83–45 (.648)
- League place: 2nd
- Owner: Arthur Soden
- Manager: Jim Hart

The 1889 Boston Beaneaters season was the 19th season of the franchise. The team finished second in the National League.

== Regular season ==
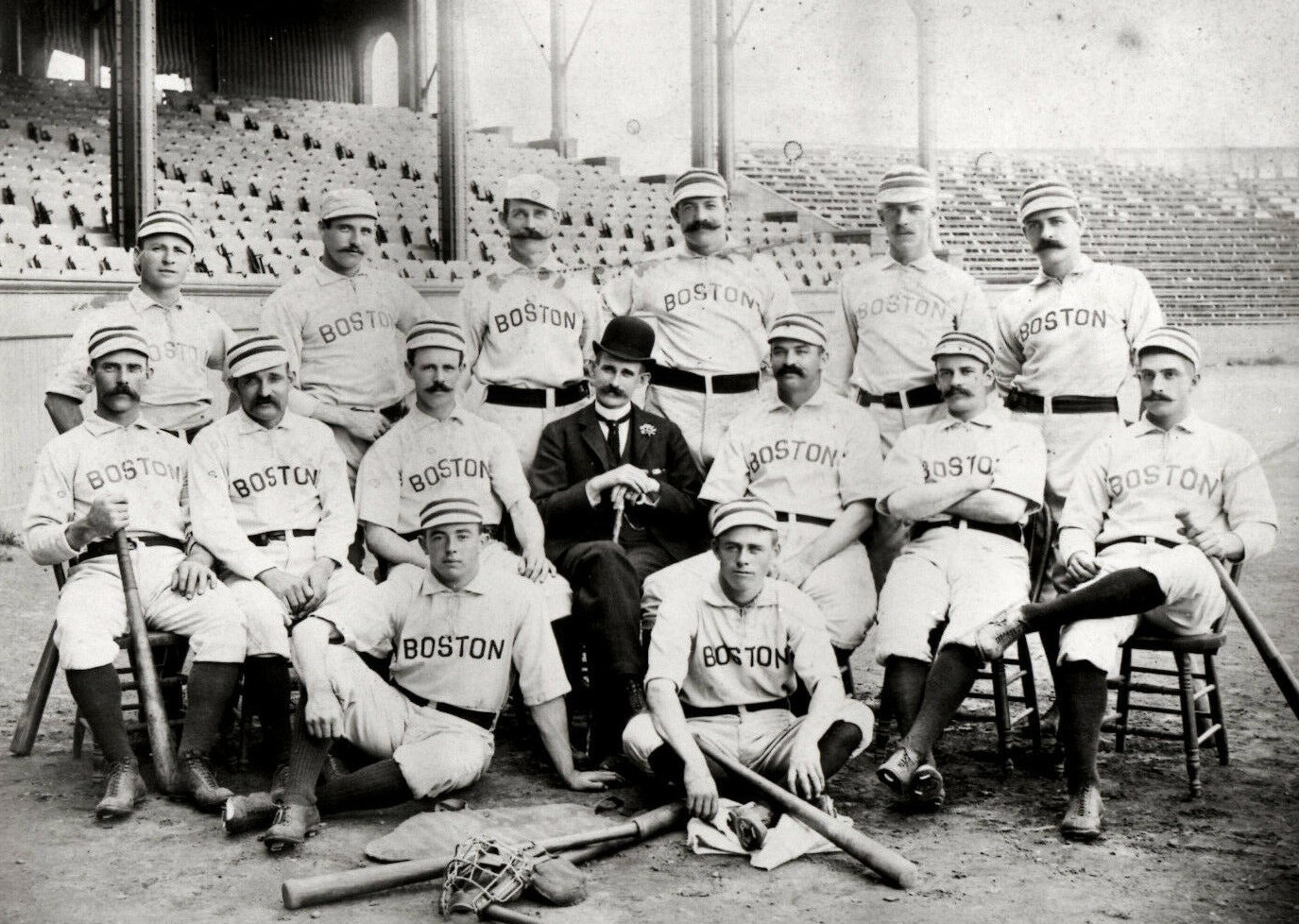
1889 Boston Beaneaters

=== Season standings ===
National League
Team	W	L	Pct.	GB	Home	Road
New York Giants	83	43	.659	—	47‍–‍15	36‍–‍28
Boston Beaneaters	83	45	.648	1	48‍–‍17	35‍–‍28
Chicago White Stockings	67	65	.508	19	37‍–‍30	30‍–‍35
Philadelphia Quakers	63	64	.496	20½	43‍–‍24	20‍–‍40
Pittsburgh Alleghenys	61	71	.462	25	40‍–‍28	21‍–‍43
Cleveland Spiders	61	72	.459	25½	33‍–‍35	28‍–‍37
Indianapolis Hoosiers	59	75	.440	28	32‍–‍36	27‍–‍39
Washington Nationals	41	83	.331	41	24‍–‍29	17‍–‍54

=== Record vs. opponents ===
1889 National League record Sources:
Team	BSN	CHI	CLE	IND	NYG	PHI	PIT	WAS
Boston	—	10–7–1	12–8–1	10–10	8–6–2	13–6	16–3	14–5–1
Chicago	7–10–1	—	11–9	13–7	5–13–1	9–10–1	10–9–1	12–7
Cleveland	8–12–1	9–11	—	9–10–1	4–14	10–9	7–13	14–3–1
Indianapolis	10–10	7–13	10–9–1	—	7–13	4–13	10–10	11–7
New York	6–8–2	13–5–1	14–4	13–7	—	12–7–1	12–7–1	13–5
Philadelphia	6–13	10–9–1	9–10	13–4	7–12–1	—	9–9	9–7–1
Pittsburgh	3–16	9–10–1	13–7	10–10	7–12–1	9–9	—	10–7
Washington	5–14–1	7–12	3–14–1	7–11	5–13	7–9–1	7–10	—

=== Roster ===
1889 Boston Beaneaters
Roster
Pitchers: John Clarkson; Bill Daley; Kid Madden; Old Hoss Radbourn; Bill Sowders	Catchers: Charlie Bennett; Charlie Ganzel; Infielders: Dan Brouthers; Billy Nash; Joe Quinn; Irv Ray; Hardy Richardson; Pop Smith	Outfielders: Tom Brown; Jerry Hurley; Dick Johnston; King Kelly	Manager: Jim Hart

== Player stats ==
=== Batting ===
==== Starters by position ====
Note: Pos = Position; G = Games played; AB = At bats; H = Hits; Avg. = Batting average; HR = Home runs; RBI = Runs batted in

Pos	Player	G	AB	H	Avg.	HR	RBI
C	Charlie Bennett	82	247	57	.231	4	28
1B	Dan Brouthers	126	485	181	.373	7	118
2B	Hardy Richardson	132	536	163	.304	6	79
SS	Joe Quinn	112	444	116	.261	2	69
3B	Billy Nash	128	481	132	.274	3	76
OF	King Kelly	125	507	149	.294	9	78
OF	Tom Brown	90	362	84	.232	2	24
OF	Dick Johnston	132	539	123	.228	5	67

==== Other batters ====
Note: G = Games played; AB = At bats; H = Hits; Avg. = Batting average; HR = Home runs; RBI = Runs batted in

Player	G	AB	H	Avg.	HR	RBI
Charlie Ganzel	73	275	73	.265	1	43
Pop Smith	59	208	54	.260	0	32
Irv Ray	9	33	10	.303	0	2
Jerry Hurley	1	4	0	.000	0	0

=== Pitching ===
==== Starting pitchers ====
Note: G = Games pitched; IP = Innings pitched; W = Wins; L = Losses; ERA = Earned run average; SO = Strikeouts

Player	G	IP	W	L	ERA	SO
John Clarkson	73	620.0	49	19	2.73	284
Old Hoss Radbourn	33	277.0	20	11	3.67	99
Kid Madden	22	178.0	10	10	4.40	64
Bill Daley	9	48.0	3	3	4.31	40

==== Other pitchers ====
Note: G = Games pitched; IP = Innings pitched; W = Wins; L = Losses; ERA = Earned run average; SO = Strikeouts

Player	G	IP	W	L	ERA	SO
Bill Sowders	7	42.0	1	2	5.14	10

==== Relief pitchers ====
Note: G = Games pitched; W = Wins; L = Losses; SV = Saves; ERA = Earned run average; SO = Strikeouts

Player	G	W	L	SV	ERA	SO
Billy Nash	1	0	0	0	0.00	0
