= Elmer Foster =

American baseball player (1861–1946)

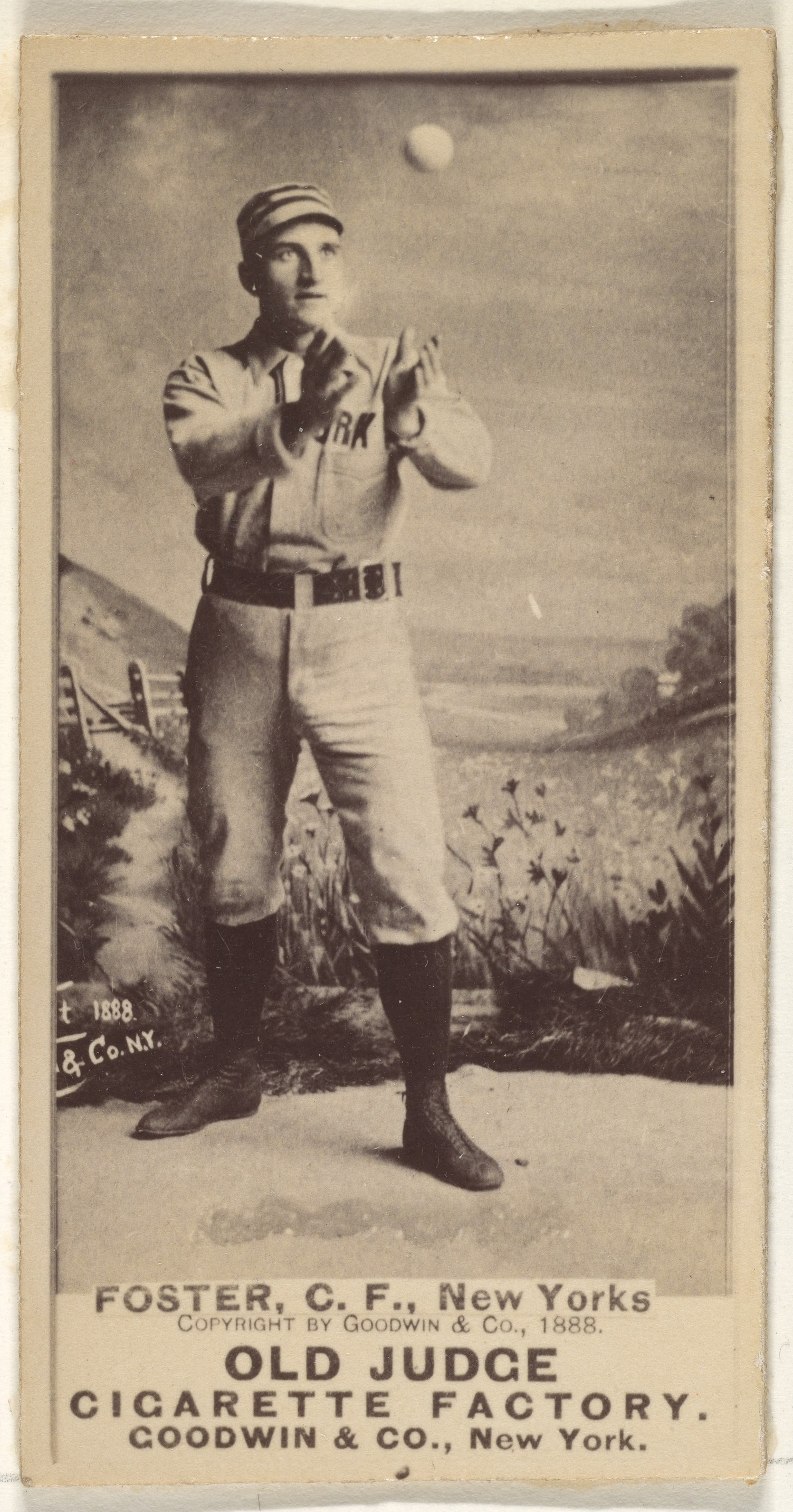
- Outfielder
- Born: August 15, 1861; Minneapolis, Minnesota, U.S.
- Died: July 22, 1946 (aged 84); Deephaven, Minnesota, U.S.
- Batted: Right Threw: Left

MLB debut
- April 17, 1886, for the New York Metropolitans

Last MLB appearance
- April 25, 1891, for the Chicago Colts

MLB statistics
- Batting average: .187
- Home runs: 6
- Runs batted in: 41
- Stats at Baseball Reference

Teams
- New York Metropolitans (1886); New York Giants (1888–1889); Chicago Colts (1890–1891)

Elmer Ellsworth Foster (August 15, 1861 – July 22, 1946) was an American outfielder in Major League Baseball who played from 1886 to 1891. He played for the New York Metropolitans, New York Giants, and Chicago Colts.
