= Harry Corson Clarke =

American actor (1861-1923)

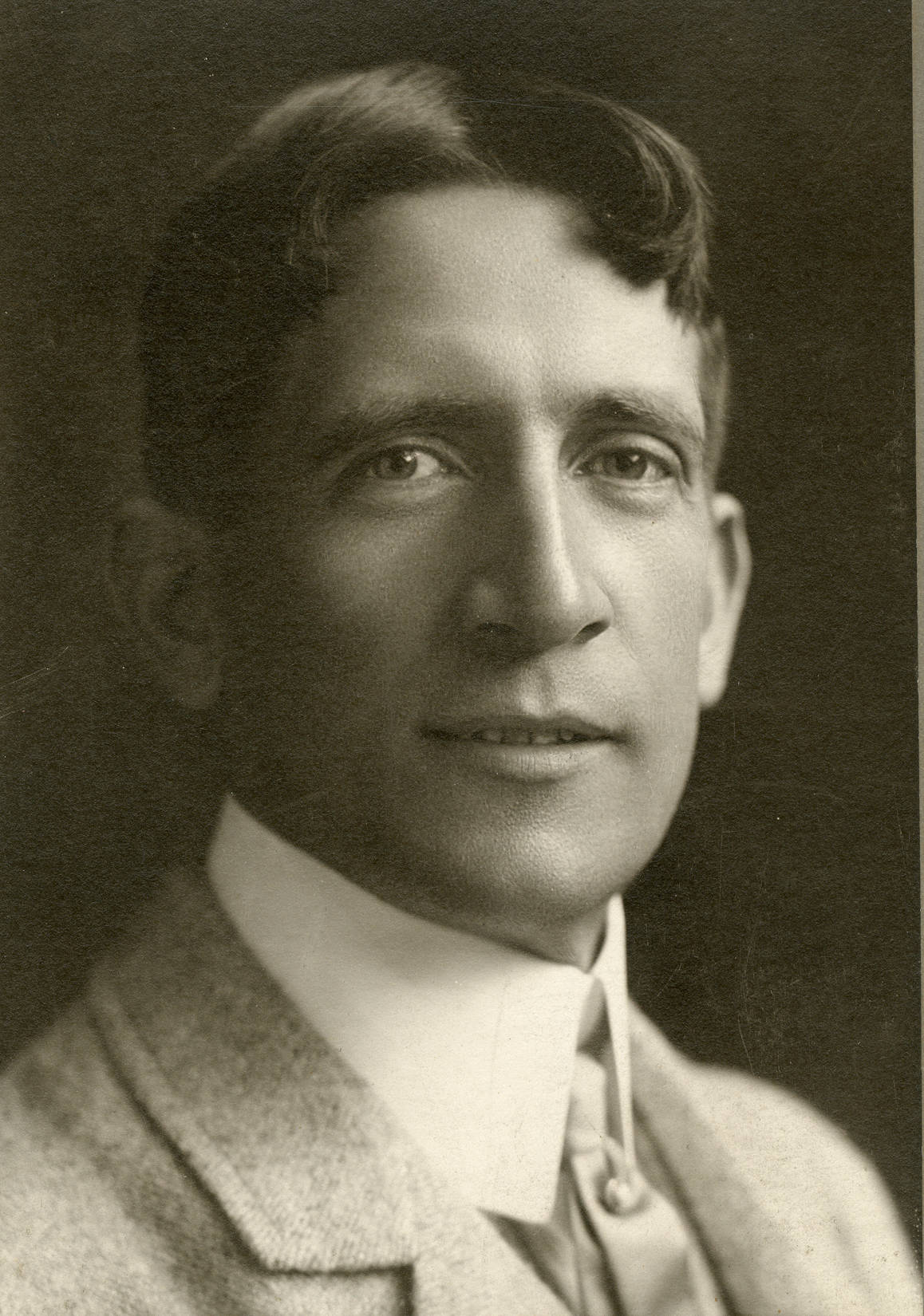
- Born: January 13, 1861; New York, New York, US
- Died: August 28, 1923 (aged 62); Los Angeles, California, US
- Occupation: Actor
- Years active: 1884–1923

Harry Corson Clarke (January 13, 1861 – March 3, 1923) was an American theatre actor and manager who played a single game of Major League baseball in 1889.

Clarke was born in New York City, the son of H. G. Clarke and Adele Clarke, both actors. His grandfather Corson W. Clarke was also a noted actor, and the stage manager at Barnum's Museum. Harry Clarke began his stage career in his youth by playing with his mother and acting as advance agent for various companies, but made his real debut as an actor in 1884, when he played a part in The Lights o' London. He next played a season of repertoire with Maud Granger's company and then appeared in the initial production of Beauty at Wallack's Theatre, New York. His next role was that of the Stage Manager in Mam'zelle. For several years thereafter he played in various stock companies, and he is said to have played 250 roles eccentric roles in as many consecutive weeks.

He worked as comedian and stage manager of the stock company at the Lyceum Theatre, Denver, and comedian of the Columbia Theatre Stock Company, San Francisco. With the latter company he had two successful seasons in Honolulu. In 1897 he first appeared as a star in What Happened to Jones, which lasted for three seasons. He then starred in What Did Tompkins Do? in the 1900–01 season and subsequently spent several seasons in stock companies. Clarke went into vaudeville in 1906, and appeared in several comedy sketches. In 1907 he began a series of years-long world-traveling tours, appearing on stage in Europe, Asia, Australia, and elsewhere.

He died in Los Angeles on March 3, 1923. He was married to actress Margaret Dale Owen, who was with him at his death. He was previously married to Alice Deming, of a wealthy San Francisco family, whom he divorced in 1904.

He played in one game for the 1889 Washington Nationals of the National League on August 28, 1889. He played right field and failed to get a hit in three at-bats.
