= Alex Jones (baseball) =

American baseball player (1869–1941)

- Pitcher
- Born: December 25, 1869; Bradford, Pennsylvania, U.S.
- Died: April 4, 1941 (aged 71); Woodville, Pennsylvania, U.S.
- Batted: Left Threw: Left

MLB debut
- September 25, 1889, for the Pittsburgh Alleghenys

Last MLB appearance
- May 16, 1903, for the Detroit Tigers

MLB statistics
- Win–loss record: 7–15
- Earned run average: 3.73
- Strikeouts: 65
- Stats at Baseball Reference

Teams
- Pittsburgh Alleghenys (1889); Louisville Colonels (1892); Washington Senators (1892); Philadelphia Phillies (1894); Detroit Tigers (1903)

Alexander H. Jones (December 25, 1869 – April 4, 1941) was an American starting pitcher in Major League Baseball who played for five different teams between the 1889 and 1903 seasons. Listed at 5 ft 6 in (1.68 m), 135 lb., Jones batted and threw left-handed.

== Biography ==
Born in Bradford, Pennsylvania on December 25, 1869, Jones was twenty years old when he entered the majors in 1889 with the Pittsburgh Alleghenys, playing for them one year before joining the Louisville Colonels (1892), Washington Senators (1892), Philadelphia Phillies (1894) and Detroit Tigers (1903). Jones always was a bad luck pitcher either due to injury or playing on a bad baseball team. His most productive season came in 1892, when he posted a 3.31 ERA in 16 combined starts for the Colonels and Senators, but finished with a negative record of 5–14. The remainder of the time, he jumped between the minors and majors for almost twenty years.

In a four-season career, Jones posted a 7–15 record with a 3.73 ERA in 26 appearances, including 18 complete games and one shutout, giving up 137 runs (54 unearned) on 199 hits and 77 walks while striking out 65 in 200 1/3 innings of work.

== Death ==
Jones died in Woodville, Allegheny County, Pennsylvania, at the age of 71.
