= Bill Burdick =

American baseball player (1859–1949)

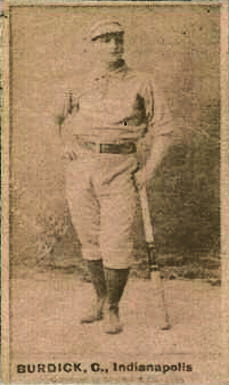
- Pitcher
- Born: October 11, 1859; Austin, Minnesota
- Died: October 23, 1949 (aged 90); Spokane, Washington
- Batted: Right Threw: Right

MLB debut
- July 23, 1888, for the Indianapolis Hoosiers

Last MLB appearance
- July 2, 1889, for the Indianapolis Hoosiers

MLB statistics
- Win–loss record: 12–14
- Strikeouts: 71
- Earned run average: 3.17
- Stats at Baseball Reference

Teams
- Indianapolis Hoosiers (1888–1889)

William Byron Burdick (October 11, 1859 – October 23, 1949) was a pitcher for Major League Baseball in the 19th century.

== Sources ==
- Career statistics from Baseball Reference
