= Dick Buckley (baseball) =

American baseball player (1858–1929)

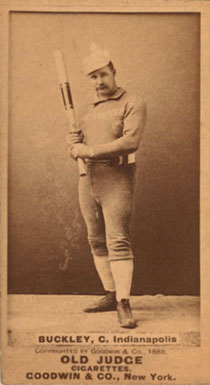
- Catcher
- Born: September 21, 1858; Troy, New York, U.S.
- Died: December 12, 1929 (aged 71); Pittsburgh, Pennsylvania, U.S.
- Batted: Right Threw: Right

MLB debut
- April 20, 1888, for the Indianapolis Hoosiers

Last MLB appearance
- September 28, 1895, for the Philadelphia Phillies

MLB statistics
- Batting average: .245
- Home runs: 26
- Runs batted in: 216
- Stats at Baseball Reference

Teams
- Indianapolis Hoosiers (1888–1889); New York Giants (1890–1891); St. Louis Browns (1892–1894); Philadelphia Phillies (1894–1895)

Richard D. Buckley (September 21, 1858 – December 12, 1929) was an American Major League Baseball player. He played from 1888 to 1895.

== Sources ==
- Career statistics from Baseball Reference · Baseball Reference (Minors) · Retrosheet · Baseball Almanac
