= Mike Sullivan (pitcher) =

American baseball player (1866–1906)

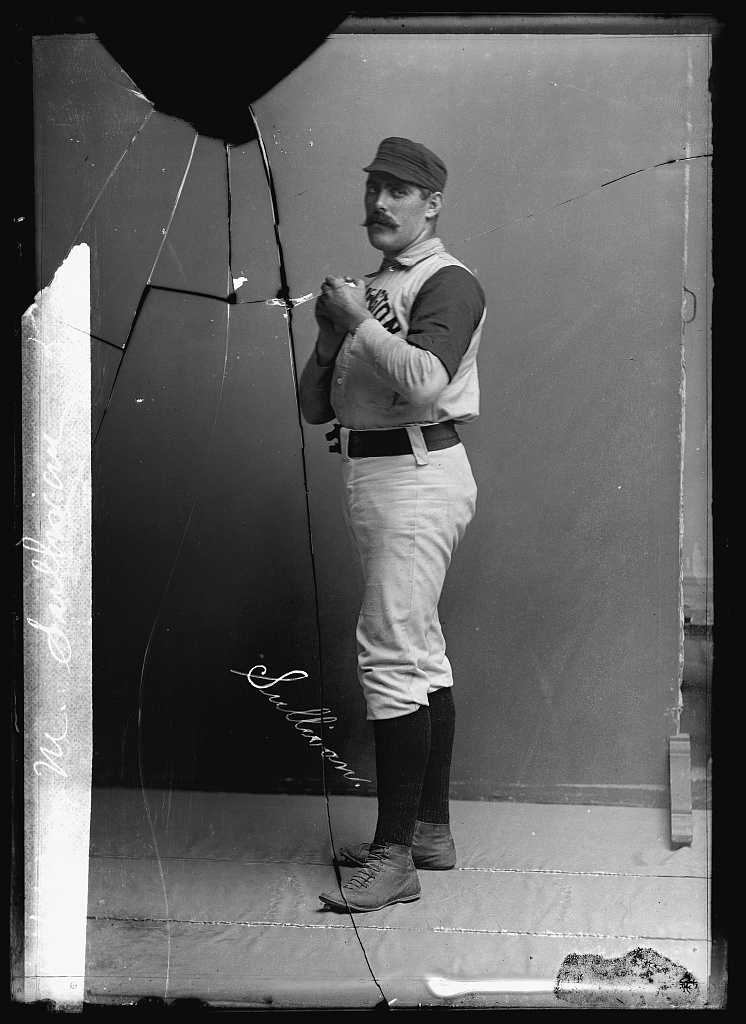
- Sullivan in Washington Nationals uniform
- Pitcher
- Born: October 23, 1870; Boston, Massachusetts, U.S.
- Died: June 14, 1906 (aged 35); Boston, Massachusetts, U.S.
- Batted: Left Threw: Right

MLB debut
- June 17, 1889, for the Washington Nationals

Last MLB appearance
- October 12, 1899, for the Boston Beaneaters

MLB statistics
- Win–loss record: 54–65
- Earned run average: 5.04
- Strikeouts: 285
- Stats at Baseball Reference

Teams
- Washington Nationals (1889); Chicago Colts (1890); Philadelphia Athletics (1891); New York Giants (1891); Cincinnati Reds (1892–1893); Washington Senators (1894); Cleveland Spiders (1894–1895); New York Giants (1896–1897); Boston Beaneaters (1899)

Michael Joseph Sullivan (October 23, 1870 – June 14, 1906) was an American professional baseball player. He played in Major League Baseball as a right-handed pitcher from 1886 to 1899 for the Washington Nationals (1889), Chicago Colts (1890), Philadelphia Athletics (1891), New York Giants (1891 and 1896–97), Cincinnati Reds (1892–93), Washington Senators (1894), Cleveland Spiders (1894–95) and the Boston Beaneaters (1899).

He led the National League in win–loss percentage (.750) in 1892.

In 10 seasons he had a 54–65 win–loss record, 160 games (119 started), 99 complete games, 1 shutout, 40 games finished, 4 saves, 1,111 1/3 innings pitched, 1,292 hits allowed, 892 runs allowed, 622 earned runs allowed, 45 home runs allowed, 568 walks allowed, 285 strikeouts, 18 hit batsmen, 76 wild pitches, a 5.04 ERA and a 1.674 WHIP.

Sullivan graduated from Boston University School of Law and served in the Massachusetts House of Representatives and Massachusetts Senate and for three terms on the Massachusetts Governor's Council. He was running for Congress as the representative of Massachusetts's 10th congressional district when he collapsed in the office of Boston Mayor John F. Fitzgerald and was pronounced dead at Boston City Hospital of a cerebral hemorrhage.
