= Al Krumm =

American baseball player (1865–1937)

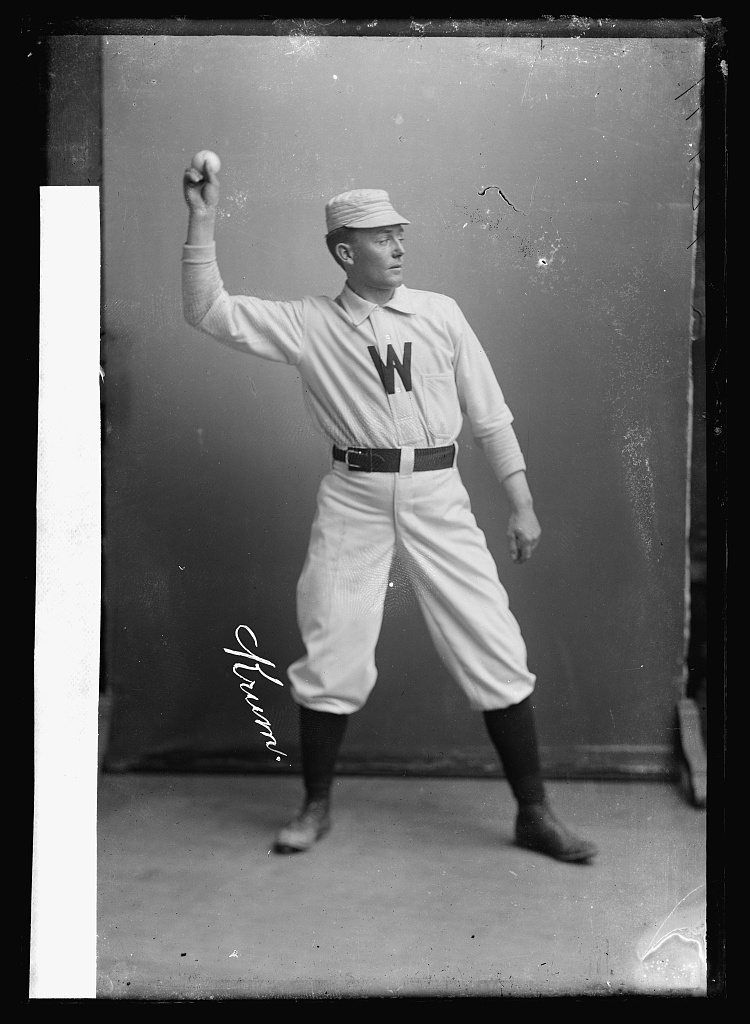
- Pitcher Al Krumm wearing a Washington Senators baseball outfit
- Pitcher
- Born: January 13, 1865; Pittsburgh, Pennsylvania
- Died: June 15, 1937 (aged 72); San Diego, California
- Batted: Unknown Threw: Right

MLB debut
- May 17, 1889, for the Pittsburgh Alleghenys

Last MLB appearance
- May 17, 1889, for the Pittsburgh Alleghenys

MLB statistics
- Win–loss record: 0–1
- Earned run average: 10.00
- Strikeouts: 4
- Stats at Baseball Reference

Teams
- Pittsburgh Alleghenys (1889)

Albert Krumm (January 13, 1865 – June 15, 1937) was a Major League Baseball pitcher who played in 1889 with the Pittsburgh Alleghenys and had his single major league start on May 17 of that year.

Primarily a steelworker, he had a reputation as a "troublemaker." He was in spring training with the Washington Senators in 1895 and pitched in an exhibition game with Varney Anderson but did not make the team. Krumm walked ten batters during his first game with the Alleghenys. He stayed with the team until July but never pitched again.

He was born in Pennsylvania and died in San Diego, California.
