= Jack Fanning =

American baseball player (1863–1917)

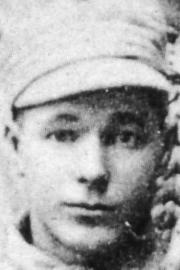
- Pitcher
- Born: 1863; South Orange, New Jersey, U.S.
- Died: June 10, 1917; Aberdeen, Washington, U.S.
- Batted: Right Threw: Right

MLB debut
- September 20, 1889, for the Indianapolis Hoosiers

Last MLB appearance
- September 1, 1894, for the Philadelphia Phillies

MLB statistics
- Win–loss record: 1–4
- Earned run average: 9.17
- Strikeouts: 7
- Stats at Baseball Reference

Teams
- Indianapolis Hoosiers (1889); Philadelphia Phillies (1894)

John Jacob Fanning (1863 – June 10, 1917) was an American professional baseball pitcher in Major League Baseball for the 1889 Indianapolis Hoosiers and 1894 Philadelphia Phillies of the National League. He also played in the minor leagues from 1886 through 1896.
