= Art McCoy =

American baseball player (1864–1904)

- Second baseman
- Born: July 15, 1864; Danville, Pennsylvania, US
- Died: March 22, 1904 (aged 39); Danville, Pennsylvania, US
- Batted: Unknown Threw: Unknown

MLB debut
- July 8, 1889, for the Washington Nationals

Last MLB appearance
- July 9, 1889, for the Washington Nationals

MLB statistics
- Batting average: .000
- Home runs: 0
- Runs batted in: 0
- Stats at Baseball Reference

Teams
- Washington Nationals (1889)

Arthur Gray McCoy (July 15, 1864 – March 22, 1904) was an American Major League Baseball player. He played in two games for the 1889 Washington Nationals of the National League on July 8 and July 9, 1889. He played second base and failed to get a hit in six at-bats.
