= Sid Farrar =

American baseball player (1859–1935)

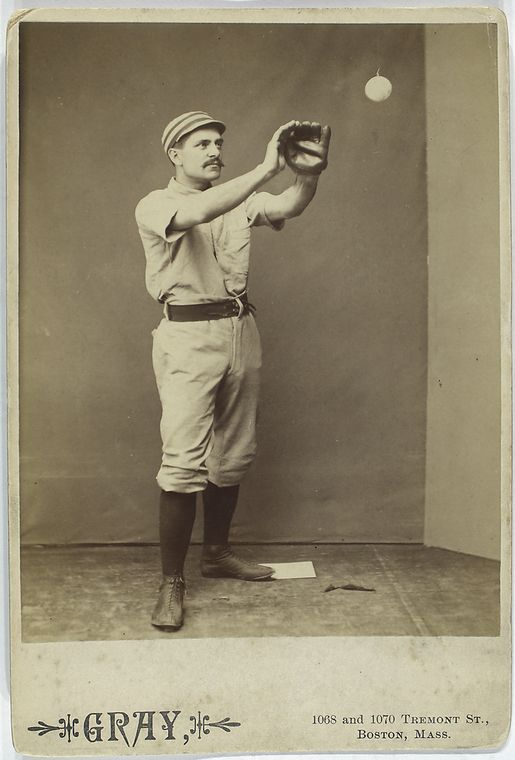
- Infielder
- Born: August 10, 1859; Paris Hill, Maine, U.S.
- Died: May 7, 1935 (aged 75); New York City, New York, U.S.
- Batted: Unknown Threw: Right

MLB debut
- May 1, 1883, for the Philadelphia Quakers

Last MLB appearance
- October 4, 1890, for the Philadelphia Athletics

MLB statistics
- Batting average: .253
- Home runs: 18
- Runs batted in: 412
- Stats at Baseball Reference

Teams
- Philadelphia Quakers (1883–1889); Philadelphia Athletics (1890)

Sidney Douglas Farrar (August 10, 1859 – May 7, 1935) was an American professional baseball infielder. He played in Major League Baseball (MLB) from 1883 through 1890 for the Philadelphia Phillies and Philadelphia Athletics. He was the father of opera singer Geraldine Farrar.
