= Chuck Lauer =

American baseball player (1865–1915)

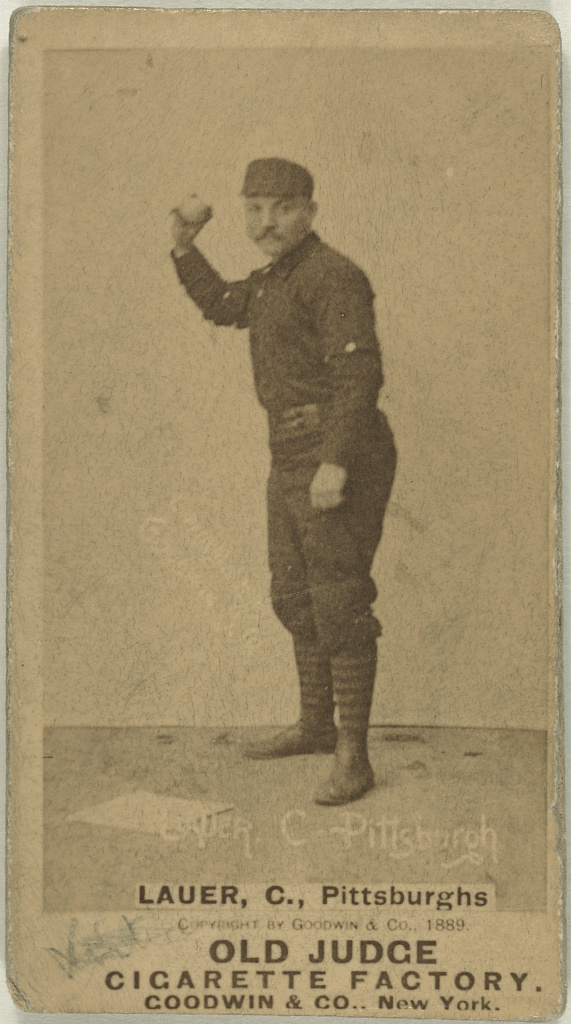
- Outfielder
- Born: April 5, 1865; Pittsburgh, Pennsylvania, U.S.
- Died: May 4, 1915 (aged 50); Buffalo, New York, U.S.
- Batted: Unknown Threw: Right

MLB debut
- July 17, 1884, for the Pittsburgh Alleghenys

Last MLB appearance
- April 28, 1890, for the Chicago Colts

MLB statistics
- Batting average: .147
- Home runs: 0
- Runs batted in: 3
- Stats at Baseball Reference

Teams
- Pittsburgh Alleghenys (1884, 1889); Chicago Colts (1890)

John Charles Lauer (April 5, 1865 – May 4, 1915) was an American Major League Baseball player who played outfield. He played from 1884–1890.
