= Jim Fogarty =

American baseball player (1864–1891)

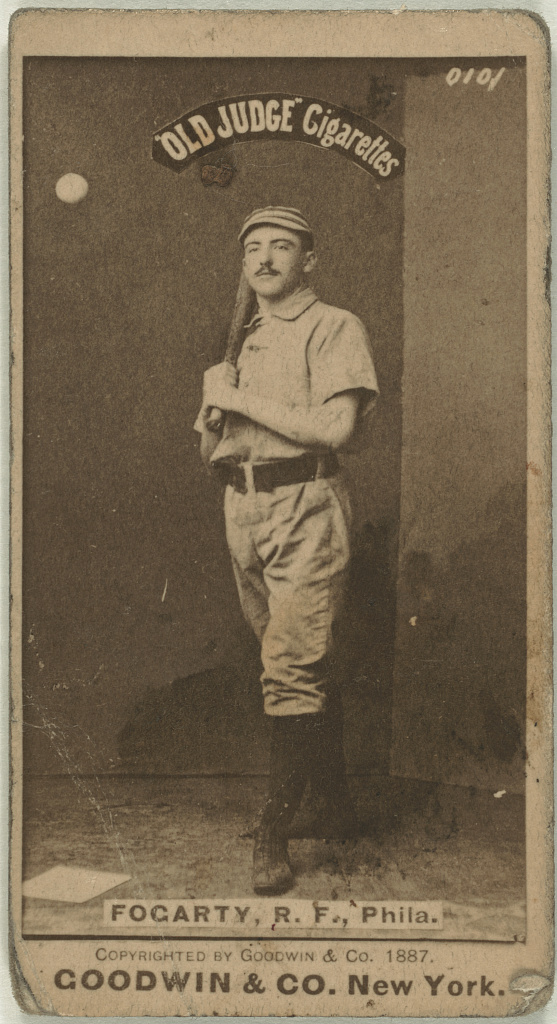
- 1887 baseball card of Fogarty
- Outfielder
- Born: February 12, 1864; San Francisco, California, U.S.
- Died: May 20, 1891 (aged 27); Philadelphia, Pennsylvania, U.S.
- Batted: Right Threw: Right

MLB debut
- May 1, 1884, for the Philadelphia Phillies

Last MLB appearance
- October 4, 1890, for the Philadelphia Athletics

MLB statistics
- Batting average: .246
- Home runs: 20
- Runs batted in: 320
- Stats at Baseball Reference

Teams
- Philadelphia Phillies (1884–1889); Philadelphia Athletics (1890)

Career highlights and awards
- NL stolen base leader (1889)

James G. Fogarty (February 12, 1864 – May 20, 1891) was an American professional baseball outfielder.

== Career ==
Fogarty was born in San Francisco, California, in 1864. In 1883, he started his professional baseball career in the minor leagues.

Fogarty was signed by the National League's Philadelphia Phillies based on a recommendation by Jerry Denny to Phillies manager Harry Wright. Fogarty played for the Phillies from 1884 to 1889.

In 1890, Fogarty played for the Players' League's Philadelphia Athletics, and he was also the team's manager for 16 games that season.

Fogarty was an average hitter, with batting averages between .212 and .293 during all seven of his major league seasons. He finished his career with a .246 batting average, 20 home runs, 320 runs batted in, and a 98 OPS+.

Fogarty was a good baserunner. In 1887, he finished second in the NL in stolen bases with 102. In 1889, he led the NL with 99 stolen bases.

Splitting his time between right field and center field, Fogarty was regarded as one of the best defensive outfielders of his era.

Before the 1891 season, Fogarty contracted tuberculosis. He died in Philadelphia in May at the age of 27.

== See also ==
- List of Major League Baseball annual stolen base leaders
- List of Major League Baseball player-managers
- List of baseball players who died during their careers

Preceded by First manager	Philadelphia Athletics (PL/AA) managers 1890	Succeeded by Charlie Buffinton
