= Andy Sommers =

American baseball player (1865–1908)

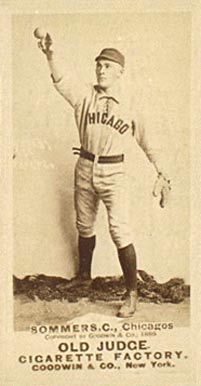
- Baseball card of Sommers
- Catcher
- Born: October 26, 1865; Cleveland, Ohio, U.S.
- Died: July 22, 1908 (aged 42); Cleveland, Ohio, U.S.
- Batted: Right Threw: Right

MLB debut
- April 27, 1887, for the New York Metropolitans

Last MLB appearance
- October 4, 1890, for the Cleveland Spiders

MLB statistics
- Batting average: .198
- Home runs: 3
- Runs batted in: 36
- Stats at Baseball Reference

Teams
- New York Metropolitans (1887); Boston Beaneaters (1888); Chicago White Stockings (1889); Indianapolis Hoosiers (1889); New York Giants (1890); Cleveland Spiders (1890)

John Andrew Sommers (October 26, 1865 – July 22, 1908) was an American professional baseball catcher. He played in Major League Baseball from 1887 to 1890 and remained active in the minor leagues through 1896.
