= St. George Cricket Grounds =

Baseball venue on Staten Island, New York

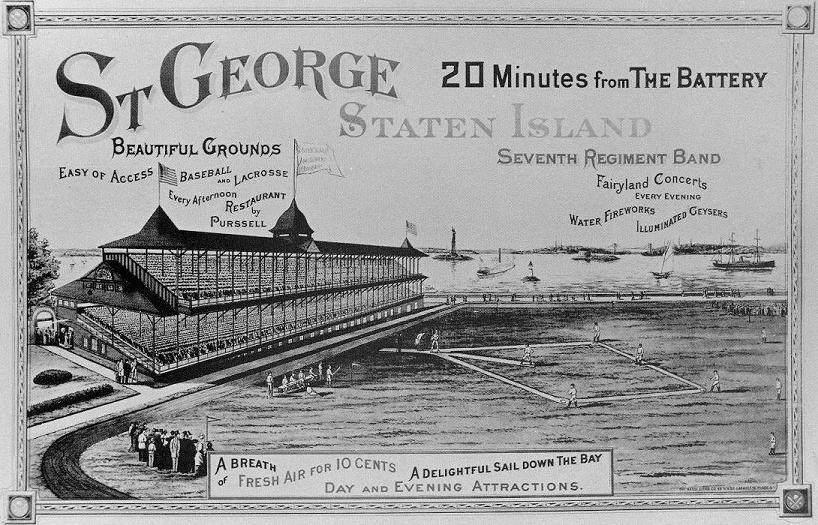
- St. George Grounds advertising poster

- Location within New York City Location within New York Location within the United States
- Location: St. George, New York, United States
- Coordinates: 40°38′39″N 74°4′31″W
- Capacity: 5,100
- Type: Stadium
- Event: Sporting events

Tenants
- New York Metropolitans (AA) (1886–1887); New York Giants (NL) (1889)

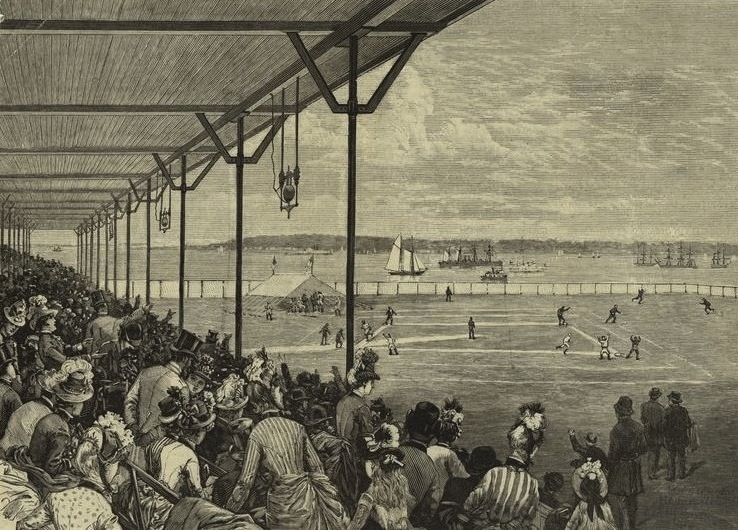
Drawing of St. George Grounds

St. George Cricket Grounds or more properly just St. George Grounds is a former baseball venue located on Staten Island, New York. St. George was the home park for the New York Metropolitans of the American Association for the 1886 and 1887 seasons. The grounds were also a part-time home to the New York Giants of the National League in 1889.

The grounds were also known as Mutrie's Dump or Mutrie's Dumping Grounds, referring to Jim Mutrie, manager of the Metropolitans and the Giants.

The stadium, which was built in the style of a typical horse race track grandstand, was first used as a baseball field in 1853, with the first game between the New York Knickerbockers and the Washington Club. The site later became part of the development of the then-new community of St. George, Staten Island in 1886, by Erastus Wiman. He established the Staten Island Amusement Company, which owned both the Metropolitans and the grounds. Fans were able to watch games while also watching the construction of the Statue of Liberty a few miles to the north.

Although the community and the ferry were successful, baseball was not. The Giants were a strong team through the latter part of the 1880s, while the Metropolitans floundered. Over time, there was less and less fan incentive to make the trip across the water from other parts of the city. The Mets folded after the 1887 season.

The Amusement Company presented various elaborate stage plays on the site, with detrimental physical impact on the grounds, leaving the field in nearly unplayable condition. In 1889, the Giants had to find a temporary home after the city closed the original Polo Grounds. The Giants played some games at St. George from April 29 – June 14, 1889, while awaiting construction of the new Polo Grounds; their move back to Manhattan ended professional baseball at St. George for over a century.

As noted in the SABR research, the Staten Island Amusement Company grounds were on a block bounded by Wall Street (north-northwest, grandstand and hence home plate); railroad tracks and New York Bay (east-northeast, left field); Hyatt Street (south-southeast, center field); and Jay Street (Richmond Terrace) (west-southwest, right field). This block is now occupied by a shopping center called Empire Outlets. The modern ballpark SIUH Community Park is across Wall Street from it to the north.

== See also ==
- Bloomingdale Park
- St George's Cricket Club
- Staten Island Cricket Club
- Van Cortlandt Park, currently used for cricket fields in New York City
- Richmond County Bank Ballpark

Preceded by Oakland Park	Home of the New York Giants; 1889	Succeeded by Polo Grounds II
