= John Morrill (baseball) =

American baseball player and manager (1855–1932)

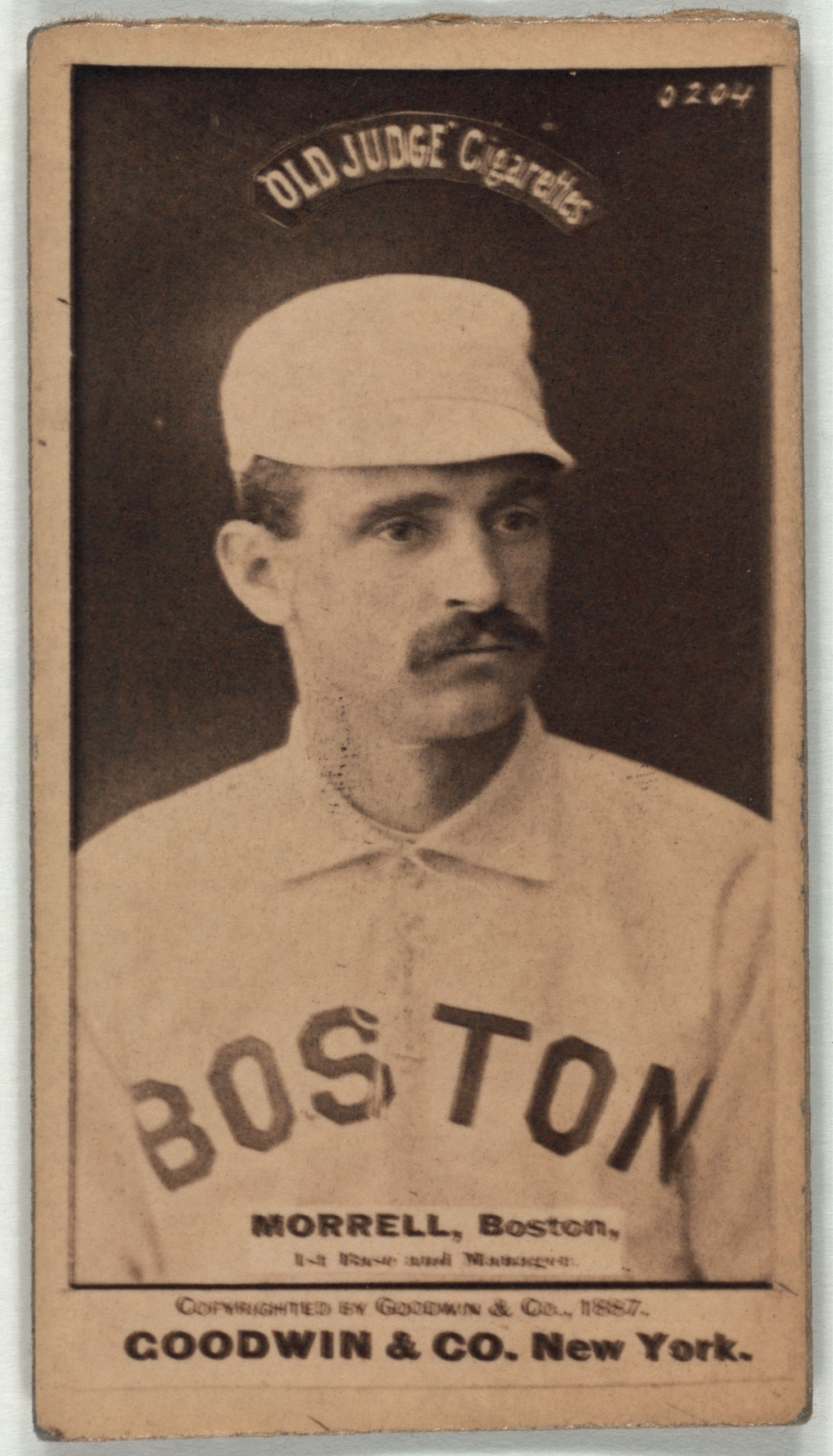
- Infielder / Manager
- Born: February 19, 1855; Boston, Massachusetts, U.S.
- Died: April 2, 1932 (aged 77); Brookline, Massachusetts, U.S.
- Batted: Right Threw: Right

MLB debut
- April 24, 1876, for the Boston Red Caps

Last MLB appearance
- July 8, 1890, for the Boston Reds

MLB statistics
- Batting average: .260
- Home runs: 43
- Runs batted in: 643
- Stats at Baseball Reference

Teams
- As player: Boston Red Caps/Beaneaters (1876–1888); Washington Nationals (1889); Boston Reds (1890); As manager: Boston Red Caps/Beaneaters (1882–1888); Washington Nationals (1889)

Career highlights and awards
- 3× NL pennant (1877, 1878, 1883)

John Francis Morrill (February 19, 1855 – April 2, 1932), nicknamed "Honest John", was an American first baseman and manager in Major League Baseball who played from 1876 to 1890 for the Boston Red Caps/Beaneaters, Washington Nationals, and Boston Reds. Over the years he played all positions. Although he pitched a couple of games each season, he was primarily an infielder, and had a career batting average of .260.

== Early life ==
Morrill's parents were Irish emigrants to Boston, where Morrill was born. He played for amateur teams including the Boston Stars and the Lowell Lowells prior to being signed by the Boston Red Legs in 1876.

== Career ==
Morrill stood 5'11" and weighed 155 pounds as he began his major league career, and he had been known as a second baseman and catcher. Once he arrived in the major leagues, Morrill only played 23 games at catcher, all of them in his first season with Boston. An obituary stated that he was one of the last catchers to appear at the position without a glove.

In an incredible season in 1883, he batted .316, played six different positions, and led the Boston Beaneaters to the National League pennant after taking over as manager from Jack Burdock in midseason.

Popular baseball manager King Kelly described Morrill as a careful manager who saved Boston a great deal of money through his decisions. Kelly cited Morrill's understanding of the rules when he said that Morrill was a better manager than anyone besides Cap Anson. Kelly dismissed the popular notion that he did not get along with Morrill.

== Later life ==
Morrill raised five children. After his retirement as a player, Morrill worked for a Boston sporting goods company, where he was manager and treasurer. He died at the age of 77 in Brookline, Massachusetts, and he was interred at the Holyhood Cemetery. The cause of death was pneumonia.

== See also ==
- List of Major League Baseball annual saves leaders
- List of Major League Baseball player-managers
