= Larry Twitchell =

American baseball player (1864–1930)

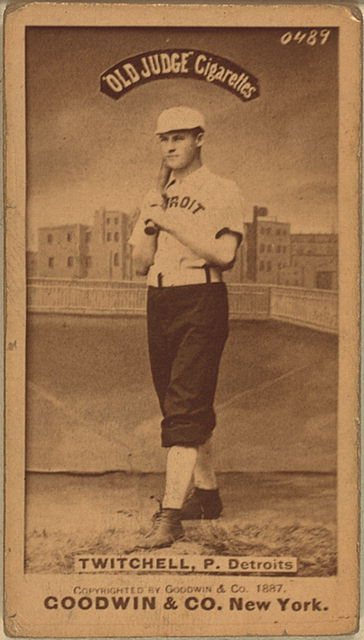
- Outfielder
- Born: February 18, 1864; Cleveland, Ohio, U.S.
- Died: April 23, 1930 (aged 66); Cleveland, Ohio, U.S.
- Batted: Right Threw: Right

MLB debut
- April 30, 1886, for the Detroit Wolverines

Last MLB appearance
- July 7, 1894, for the Louisville Colonels

MLB statistics
- Batting average: .263
- Home runs: 19
- Runs batted in: 384
- Stats at Baseball Reference

Teams
- Detroit Wolverines (1886–1888); Cleveland Spiders (1889); Cleveland Infants (1890); Buffalo Bisons (1890); Columbus Solons (1891); Washington Senators (1892); Louisville Colonels (1893–1894)

Career highlights and awards
- World Series champion (1887)

Lawrence Grant Twitchell (February 18, 1864 – April 23, 1930) was an American professional baseball player from 1886 to 1896. He played nine seasons in Major League Baseball, primarily as an outfielder but occasionally as a pitcher, with seven different major league clubs. His best seasons were spent with the Detroit Wolverines from 1886 to 1888, the Cleveland Spiders in 1889, and the Louisville Colonels from 1893 to 1894.

Known for his strong throwing arm, Twitchell once reportedly threw a baseball 407 feet, further than any other 19th century player. He also served as the manager of the Milwaukee Brewers during the 1895 and 1896 seasons.

== Early years ==
Twitchell was born in Cleveland, Ohio in 1864. He first built his reputation as a baseball player while playing for the Oberlin College team.

== Professional baseball career ==
=== Detroit Wolverines ===
Twitchell's major league career began inauspiciously in 1886 as a pitcher for the Detroit Wolverines. He was the starting pitcher in four games, threw two complete games, and compiled an 0–2 record with a 6.48 earned run average (ERA). He had one hit and two strikeouts in 16 at bats for a .063 batting average.

In 1887, Twitchell spent his first full major league season with the 1887 Detroit team that won the National League pennant and defeated the St. Louis Browns in the 1887 World Series. Twitchell continued to pitch for Detroit in 1887 and also appeared in 53 games as an outfielder, mostly in center field. As a pitcher, he compiled the best winning percentage (.917) on the championship team with an 11–1 record. He appeared in 15 games as a pitcher, 12 as a starter, pitched 11 complete games, and had a 4.33 ERA. Twitchell also proved valuable as a batter with a .333 batting average, six triples, 51 RBIs and 12 stolen bases. Twitchell also hit well in the World Series where he hit a home run and scored five runs.

In 1888, Twitchell completed his evolution from pitcher to outfielder. He appeared in 131 games in Detroit's outfield and pitched only four innings in relief. However, his batting average dropped by 90 points from .333 in 1887 to .244 in 1888. He also contributed 19 doubles, four triples, five home runs, 67 RBIs and 14 stolen bases. After winning the pennant in 1887, the 1888 team finished in fifth place with a 68–63 record. With high salaries owed to the team's star players, and gate receipts declining markedly, the team folded in October 1888 season with the players being sold to other teams. Twitchell was sold in December 1888 to the Cleveland Spiders along with Ed Beatin, Henry Gruber and Sy Sutcliffe.

Twitchell was known for his strong throwing arm, contributing to his success as both a pitcher and an outfielder. One newspaper account published in 1905 states that he held the unofficial record for the longest throw of a baseball at 407 feet, two feet further than Ed Crane's official record of 405 feet.

=== Cleveland Spiders ===
Twitchell appeared in a career high 134 games as an outfielder for the Cleveland Spiders in 1889. He compiled a .275 batting average with 16 doubles, 11 triples, four home runs, 95 RBIs and 17 stolen bases. He ranked eighth in the National League in both triples and RBIs. The high point of his career came on August 15, 1889, when he hit for the cycle, getting six hits and 16 total bases (a home run, three triples, a double and a single) in six at bats off Mike Madden of the Boston Beaneaters. Twitchell also turned a double play from the outfield and scored five runs in the game, as Cleveland beat Boston by a 19–8 score.

=== Players' League ===
In 1890, Twitchell jumped to the new Players' League where he started the season with the Cleveland Infants and finished it with the Buffalo Bisons. In mid-July, the Infants sold him to the Bisons. In a total of 100 Players' League games, he compiled a .222 batting average with four home runs and 53 RBIs. Twitchell also returned to pitching in a significant way in 1890. He pitched in 13 games for the Bisons, threw 12 complete games, and compiled a 5–7 record with a 4.57 ERA.

=== Columbus and Washington ===
Twitchell began the 1891 season in the minor leagues with Omaha of the Western Association, compiling a .264 average with eight triples in 66 games. On July 20, 1891, he signed with the Columbus Solons of the American Association. In 57 games for Columbus, Twitchell hit .277 with four triples, two home runs, 35 RBIs, and 10 stolen bases.

In 1892, Twitchell returned to the National League with the Washington Senators. He appeared in 51 games for the Senators, compiling a disappointing .218 batting average with five triples and 20 RBIs. Twitchell also spent part of the 1892 season in the minor leagues playing for the Milwaukee Brewers and Indianapolis Hoosiers of the Western League .

=== Louisville ===
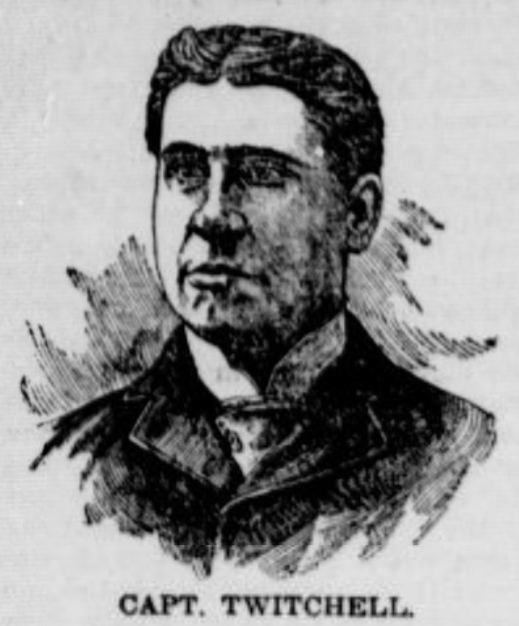
Larry Twitchell in 1896

In 1893, Twitchell staged a brief comeback, having one of the best seasons of his career with the Louisville Colonels of the National League. He compiled a .310 batting average and .377 on-base percentage and, in 45 games, contributed 11 doubles, three triples, two home runs, 31 RBIs and seven stolen bases. Applying sabermetrics to his 1893 season, his Offensive Wins Above Replacement rating was the tied with the 1887 season for the highest of his career.

Twitchell concluded his major league career with Louisville in 1894. He compiled a .267 batting average in 52 games and appeared in his last major league game on July 7, 1894.

=== Milwaukee Brewers ===
After his major league career had ended, Twitchell continued playing in the minor leagues. He appeared in 185 games for the Milwaukee Brewers of the Western League during the 1894 and 1895 seasons. He also served as a player/manager for the Brewers in 1895 and 1896.

== Later years ==
After retiring from baseball, Twitchell worked as a commercial salesman in Ohio. On July 21, 1921, Twitchell played in the outfield for an old-timers team in a game against veteran sandlot players to celebrate Cleveland's 125th anniversary as a city. Cy Young and Chief Zimmer made up the battery, and Hall of Famers Nap Lajoie and Elmer Flick also played.

Twitchell died in Cleveland in 1930. He was buried in Lakewood Park Cemetery in Rocky River, Ohio.

== See also ==
- List of Major League Baseball single-game hits leaders
- List of Major League Baseball players to hit for the cycle

Achievements
Preceded by Jack Glasscock	Hitting for the cycle August 15, 1889	Succeeded by Mike Tiernan
