= Gus Krock =

American baseball player (1866–1905)

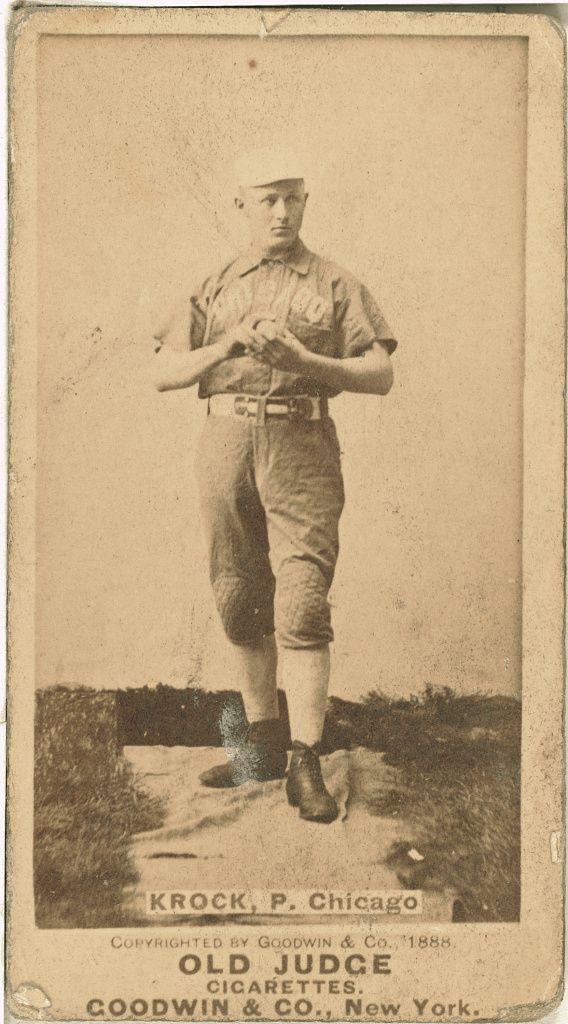
- 1888 baseball card of Krock
- Pitcher
- Born: May 9, 1866; Milwaukee, Wisconsin, U.S.
- Died: March 22, 1905 (aged 38); Pasadena, California, U.S.
- Batted: Right Threw: Right

MLB debut
- April 24, 1888, for the Chicago White Stockings

Last MLB appearance
- July 26, 1890, for the Buffalo Bisons

MLB statistics
- Win–loss record: 32–26
- Earned run average: 3.49
- Strikeouts: 209
- Stats at Baseball Reference

Teams
- Chicago White Stockings (1888–1889); Indianapolis Hoosiers (1889); Washington Nationals (1889); Buffalo Bisons (1890)

August H. Krock (May 9, 1866 – March 22, 1905) was an American Major League Baseball pitcher. He played three seasons, from 1888 to 1890, for the Chicago White Stockings, Indianapolis Hoosiers, Washington Nationals, and Buffalo Bisons. In Krock's debut season, 1888 with the White Stockings, he had 25 wins and 14 losses.
