= 1889 in baseball =

The following are the baseball events of the year 1889 throughout the world.

== Champions ==
=== Major League Baseball ===
- National League: New York Giants
- American Association: Brooklyn Bridegrooms

World Series

New York defeated Brooklyn, six games to three.

Ohio Championship

- First place: Columbus Solons
- Second place: Cincinnati Red Stockings
- Third place: Cleveland Spiders

Philadelphia Championship

- Draw between the Philadelphia Quakers and the Philadelphia Athletics, who both won and lost five games apiece.

=== Minor League Baseball ===
- Atlantic League: Worcester
- California League: Oakland
- Central Interstate League: Davenport
- Michigan State League: Jackson
- Middle States League: Harrisburg
- New York State League: Auburn
- Southern League: New Orleans
- Tri-State League: Canton
- Western Association: Omaha

=== College baseball ===
- Tri-Collegiate League: Yale University

== Statistical leaders ==
	American Association		National League	
Stat	Player	Total	Player	Total
AVG	Tommy Tucker (BAL)	.372	Dan Brouthers (BSN)	.373
HR	Bug Holliday (CIN); Harry Stovey (PHA)	19	Sam Thompson (PHI)	20
RBI	Harry Stovey (PHA)	119	Roger Connor (NYG)	130
W	Bob Caruthers (BRO)	40	John Clarkson^{1} (BSN)	49
ERA	Jack Stivetts (STL)	2.25	John Clarkson^{1} (BSN)	2.73
K	Mark Baldwin (COL)	368	John Clarkson^{1} (BSN)	284

^{1} National League Triple Crown pitching winner

== Major league baseball final standings ==
=== American Association final standings ===
American Association
Team	W	L	Pct.	GB	Home	Road
Brooklyn Bridegrooms	93	44	.679	—	50‍–‍19	43‍–‍25
St. Louis Browns	90	45	.667	2	51‍–‍18	39‍–‍27
Philadelphia Athletics	75	58	.564	16	46‍–‍22	29‍–‍36
Cincinnati Red Stockings	76	63	.547	18	47‍–‍26	29‍–‍37
Baltimore Orioles	70	65	.519	22	40‍–‍24	30‍–‍41
Columbus Solons	60	78	.435	33½	36‍–‍33	24‍–‍45
Kansas City Cowboys	55	82	.401	38	35‍–‍35	20‍–‍47
Louisville Colonels	27	111	.196	66½	18‍–‍46	9‍–‍65

Locations of teams for the 1889 American Association season
American Association

=== National League final standings ===
National League
Team	W	L	Pct.	GB	Home	Road
New York Giants	83	43	.659	—	47‍–‍15	36‍–‍28
Boston Beaneaters	83	45	.648	1	48‍–‍17	35‍–‍28
Chicago White Stockings	67	65	.508	19	37‍–‍30	30‍–‍35
Philadelphia Quakers	63	64	.496	20½	43‍–‍24	20‍–‍40
Pittsburgh Alleghenys	61	71	.462	25	40‍–‍28	21‍–‍43
Cleveland Spiders	61	72	.459	25½	33‍–‍35	28‍–‍37
Indianapolis Hoosiers	59	75	.440	28	32‍–‍36	27‍–‍39
Washington Nationals	41	83	.331	41	24‍–‍29	17‍–‍54

Locations of teams for the 1889 National League season
National League

== Notable seasons ==
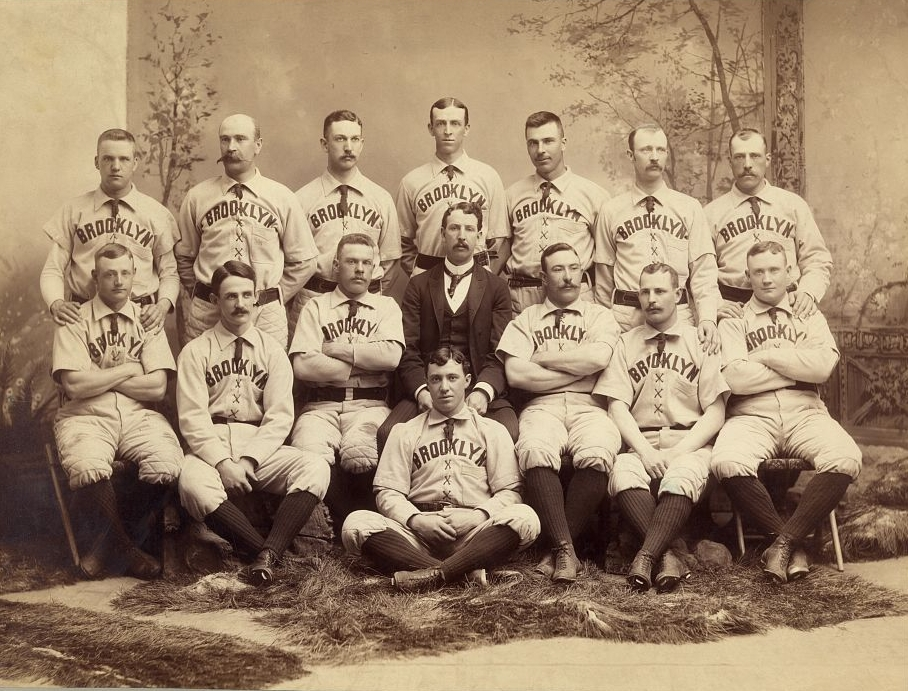
1889 Brooklyn Bridegrooms

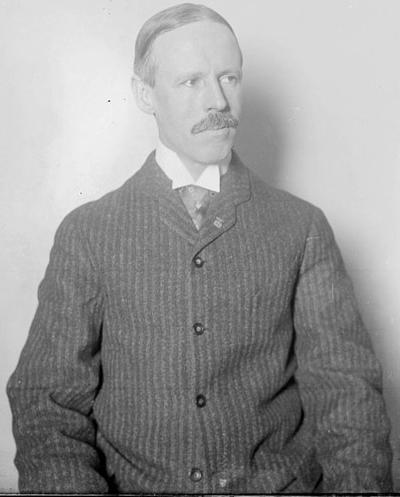
John Clarkson

- Boston Beaneaters first baseman Dan Brouthers led the NL in batting average (.373). He was second in the NL in on-base percentage (.462), adjusted OPS+ (165), and runs batted in (118). He was third in the NL in slugging percentage (.507).
- Boston Beaneaters pitcher John Clarkson had a win–loss record of 49–19 and led the NL in innings pitched (620), wins (49), shutouts (8), earned run average (2.73), adjusted ERA+ (150), and strikeouts (284).

== Events ==
=== January–February ===
- January 22 – The Indianapolis Hoosiers, with $30,000 in debt, surrender control of the franchise to the National League in the hopes of finding new ownership.
- February 2 – John T. Brush heads up a group that assumes ownership of the Indianapolis Hoosiers.
- February 8 – Demolition crews for the City of New York begin the dismantling of the Polo Grounds in order to run new streets through the property. The New York Giants will be forced to play their home games at Oakland Park in Jersey City and the St. George Cricket Grounds on Staten Island until a new Polo Grounds is finished in early July.
- February 19 – A tour of baseball players led by John Ward stages its first game in Europe, playing in Naples, Italy.

=== March–April ===
- March 7 – Pittsburgh Allegheny players Bill Kuehne and Ed Morris are arrested and charged with operating a gambling house out of their billiard parlor. The charges against both are dropped when the prosecution's star witness fails to appear in court to testify against them.
- March 20 – A New York City sporting goods house receives an order from Japan for baseball equipment. The corresponding letter states that a league will soon be formed as the game has been played there for several months already.
- April 17 – The American Association season begins.
- April 23 – New York Governor David Hill vetoes a bill from the state legislature that would block the street construction at the Polo Grounds.
- April 24 – The New York Giants play their home opener at Oakland Park in Jersey City.
- April 29 – The New York Giants play their first home game at the St. George Cricket Grounds on Staten Island. The right fielder plays on a stage used for theatre productions in the multi-purpose complex.

=== May–June ===
- May 1 – George Keefe of the Washington Nationals sets a record by walking seven batters in one inning in a game against the New York Giants.
- May 2 – Yank Robinson of the St. Louis Browns is fined and suspended after getting into a shouting match with Browns owner Chris von der Ahe. His teammates nearly refuse to make a trip to Kansas City and do lose three straight games to the Cowboys amid suspicion they are throwing the games because of Robinson's suspension.
- May 6 – Chris von der Ahe, owner of the Browns, rescinds Yank Robinson's suspension. The Browns respond by beating the Kansas City Cowboys, their first victory since the suspension.
- May 7 – Yank Robinson returns to the Browns lineup and goes 4–6 at the plate, leading St. Louis to a 21–0 win over the Columbus Solons.
- May 9 – Amos Rusie makes his major league debut with the Indianapolis Hoosiers.
- May 14 – The Pittsburgh Alleghenys suspend pitchers Ed Morris and Pete Conway, so they will not have to pay the salaries for the two sore-armed pitchers. Morris will return in three weeks although he will never again be an effective pitcher while Conway, a 30-game winner in 1888, will never pitch again.
- May 19 – Most of the seating is destroyed by fire at Brooklyn's Washington Park. The stands will be rebuilt within a month.
- May 24 – Bill Kuehne of the Pittsburgh Alleghenys sets a record by handling 13 chances at third base in one game.
- May 25 – When Dave Orr of the Columbus Solons refuses to leave the field after being ejected, umpire Fred Goldsmith declares the game forfeited to the visiting Brooklyn Bridegrooms. Both teams refuse to abide by the forfeit and complete the game after Orr is replaced by a substitute.
- May 30 – The Brooklyn Bridegrooms defeat the St. Louis Browns 9–7 in front of the largest crowd in American Association history. 22,122 fans fill Washington Park, which has only 3,000 seats available after the fire 11 days earlier that destroyed the stands.
- June 7 – Pete Browning hits for the cycle in a losing cause, as the Louisville Colonels fall to the Philadelphia Athletics, 9–7. It is Louisville's 14th consecutive loss and the second time Browning has hit for the cycle in his career.
- June 11 – Dan Brouthers strikes out in a game for the first time this season. Brouthers will end the year with only six strikeouts in over 550 plate appearances.
- June 13 – After the Louisville Colonels lose their 19th straight game, owner-manager Mordecai Davidson threatens to fine each player $25 if they lose their next game, even though the players are already owed back pay by Davidson.
- June 15 – Protesting Mordecai Davidson's threat of fines, only six Louisville Colonels players show up for their game against the Baltimore Orioles. Davidson is forced to pick up three Baltimore amateurs to play the outfield. Charles Fisher, John Traffley and Mike Gaule each make the only appearance of their careers as Louisville loses their 20th in a row.
- June 17 – After consulting Baltimore manager, Billy Barnie, the striking players of the Louisville Colonels return to the field for a doubleheader. The Colonels blow a ninth inning 6–3 lead in Game 1 to lose and manage only one hit while committing seven errors to drop the second game.
- June 19 – Center fielder Dummy Hoy sets a major league record by throwing three runners out at the plate in one game.
- June 22 – The Sporting News reports that major league players are unhappy with the classification system for pay and no say or share in their sale to other clubs, and that a strike is imminent beginning in early July.
- June 22 – The Louisville Colonels drop a pair of games to the St. Louis Browns to extend their losing streak to 26 games, which still stands as the major league record.
- June 23 – Louisville finally gets a win in defeating the Browns 7–3.
- June 24 – Louisville owner-manager Mordecai Davidson resigns as manager and hires an Eclipse Park employee as the new manager, although right fielder Jimmy Wolf will actually run the team.
- June 28 – Billy Hamilton hits three triples in the first game of a doubleheader and then adds another one in the nightcap to set a record for most triples in a doubleheader.

=== July–August ===
- Early July – John Montgomery Ward convinces representatives for The Brotherhood of Professional Base-Ball Players to hold off on their planned strike for a couple of weeks until he can present them with a better long-term solution.
- July 2 – Louisville Colonels owner Mordecai Davidson, unable to pay the players salaries, turns the team over to the American Association. The AA will announce new ownership for the team within 3 days.
- July 6 – Player-manager John Morrill, with his team in last place in the National League at 13–40 and a personal batting average of .185, is let go by the Washington Nationals after leaving the team to go see ailing relatives in Worcester.
- July 8 – The New York Giants play their first game at the newly relocated Polo Grounds. The stadium will remain a fixture in major league baseball until its demolition in 1964.
- July 12 – John Clarkson of the Boston Beaneaters is taken out after pitching five innings of no-hit ball in order to rest him for his next start. His teammate, reliever Bill Sowders, allows one hit over the last four innings for the combined one-hitter.
- July 14 – Albert Spalding publishes his ideas for the classification and structure of the minor leagues. His ideas will be the foundation of minor league baseball that last to the present day.
- July 14 – At a secret meeting of the Brotherhood of Professional Base-Ball Players held at the Fifth Avenue Hotel in New York City, John Montgomery Ward instructs Brotherhood representatives that "each player look up the feasibility of securing capital in his own city" for the purpose of starting a competing league that would give the players an equal say in all baseball matters.
- July 24 – Joe Dowie will collect only 17 hits in his one season of major league baseball, but five of them come on this day as he helps the Baltimore Orioles to an easy 17–3 win over the Louisville Colonels.
- July 26 – Jay Faatz hits possibly the shortest grand slam ever when he hits a ball that ricochets off of the third baseman's foot and rolls under some temporary bleachers placed close to third base. Faatz circles the bases as the ball is still in play according to the park's ground rules.
- July 29 – Mike "King" Kelly of the Boston Beaneaters robs the Philadelphia Quakers of a victory when, after Sam Thompson had apparently hit a long drive over the right field fence for a home run, he manages to throw a ball back into the infield that holds Thompson on the bases. While the Quakers argue that Kelly used a different ball, the umpire rules it is the game ball and allows the play to stand. Thompson is stranded on base as the Beaneaters go on to win 7–6 in extra innings.
- August 7 – The Cleveland Spiders score 14 runs in the third inning, still a record for that inning, during a 20–6 win over the Washington Nationals.
- August 8 – Shortstop Jack Glasscock of the Indianapolis Hoosiers hits for the cycle against the New York Giants. Indianapolis wins, 14–4.
- August 12 – The first-place St. Louis Browns complete a three-game sweep in St. Louis over the second place Brooklyn Bridegrooms, with an 11–0 win in front of 32,911 fans.
- August 15 – Cleveland Spiders outfielder Larry Twitchell hits for the cycle in a 19–8 victory over the Boston Beaneaters. In addition, the Spiders become the first National League team to score a run in every inning of a game.
- August 18 – The Cincinnati police stop a scheduled Cincinnati Red Stockings Sunday game after a court ruling prohibits Sunday baseball. The ban will be a factor in the Red Stockings' decision to jump to the National League in 1890, due to its policy against Sunday games.
- August 25 – The Red Stockings are again stopped by police from playing a Sunday game.

=== September–October ===
- September 1 – After having led the American Association all but three days of the season, the St. Louis Browns fall out of first place by losing in extra innings to the Columbus Solons.
- September 3 – Con Daily of the Indianapolis Hoosiers makes the final out in a 7–6 loss to the Boston Beaneaters just after the umpire had apparently called time. Given a second chance, Daily hits a two-run single to give the Hoosiers an 8–7 win.
- September 7 – In a critical two-game series, the St. Louis Browns leave the field in Brooklyn in the ninth inning leading 4–2 claiming it is too dark to continue play. Umpire Fred Goldsmith disagrees and forfeits the game to the Brooklyn Bridegrooms. Several Browns players are hit by thrown bottles as they leave the park.
- September 8 – Citing safety concerns, the Browns fail to show for their game against Brooklyn and forfeit for the second day in a row, giving the Bridegrooms a 4½ game lead over the Browns.
- September 11 – In a season that will have 135 rainouts between the two leagues, every scheduled game in both leagues is postponed due to rain on this day.
- September 23 – The American Association, in an emergency meeting, overturns the forfeit by the St. Louis Browns on September 7 and awards them a 4–2 victory. The ruling draws the Browns back to within 4½ games of the Brooklyn Bridegrooms.
- September 25 – The Brotherhood of Professional Base-Ball Players' organizational plan for a new Players' League is leaked to the press in New York City. It calls for clubs to be owned jointly by players and capitalists.
- September 27 – Out of the pennant race, the Philadelphia Quakers make a largely symbolic move by releasing Brotherhood activists outfielder George Wood, who is batting .251, and pitcher Dan Casey, who has a 6–10 record.
- October 5 – The New York Giants clinch the National League pennant on the last day of the season with a 5–3 win coupled with the Boston Beaneaters 6–1 loss. It was the first time in major league history that the pennant was determined on the last day of the season.
- October 6 – The Brooklyn Bridegrooms complete their home schedule with a 9–0 victory. Brooklyn sets a new National League season attendance record by drawing 353,690 fans in a season.
- October 15 – Having to win their final five games to win the American Association pennant, the St. Louis Browns lose in their first try, giving the flag to the Brooklyn Bridegrooms who have already completed their season.
- October 18 – The Brooklyn Bridegrooms take Game 1 of the best-of-11 World Series with a 12–10 victory over the New York Giants.
- October 19 – The Giants even the series by taking Game 2 by a score of 6–2.
- October 22 – The Bridegrooms take Game 3 by a score of 8–7 in a game called because of darkness that ends with the Giants having the bases loaded and one out in the top of the ninth inning.
- October 23 – In another game called early by darkness, New York scores five runs in the top of the sixth inning to tie the game at seven, only to see the Bridegrooms win it on a three-run homer by Oyster Burns in the bottom of the sixth.
- October 24 – The Giants win Game 5 by a score of 11–3.
- October 25 – New York evens the series at three games apiece by tying the game at 1 with a run in the ninth inning. The Giants then win it in the 11th inning as Hank O'Day outlasts Adonis Terry in the 2–1 extra inning thriller.
- October 26 – New York wins again, taking an 11–7 triumph over the Bridegrooms.
- October 28 – The Giants win their fourth straight game by defeating Brooklyn 16–7.
- October 29 – The New York Giants win their second consecutive World Series title by beating the Brooklyn Bridegrooms, 3–2, for their fifth straight win in taking the series 6 games to 3.

=== November–December ===
- November 4 – The Brotherhood of Professional Base-Ball Players issues its Manifesto stating that "players have been bought‚ sold and exchanged as though they were sheep instead of American citizens."
- November 7 – The Brotherhood meets to begin formal preparation for their new Players' League to begin in the 1890 season.
- November 13 – The Brooklyn Bridegrooms and the Cincinnati Red Stockings jump from the American Association to the National League in the middle of an AA league meeting.
- November 14 – The Kansas City Cowboys drop out of the American Association in order to join the Western League.
- November 21 – The National League issues its reply to the Players' League manifesto. Claiming that the League saved baseball in 1876 and that under the reserve rules players' salaries had "more than trebled", the NL denounces the Brotherhood movement as "the efforts of certain overpaid players to again control [baseball] for their own aggrandizement. . . to its ultimate dishonor and disintegration."
- November 25 – Former Indianapolis Hoosiers shortstop Jack Glasscock, claiming that his pledge to the Players' League does not constitute a binding contract, becomes the first defection from the Brotherhood when he signs with the New York Giants of the National League, thus becoming the first "double jumper" in major league history.
- November 30 – The Baltimore Orioles drop out of the American Association, leaving the AA with only four teams.
- December 16 – The Players' League is formally organized, selecting Colonel Edwin A. McAlpin as president.
- December 17 – The Players' League votes to utilize a two-man umpiring crew for their 1890 season and also set their pitching distance at 57 feet, a 1½ foot increase over the NL and AA.
- December 18 – The Players' League votes to expel any Brotherhood member who has signed an 1890 contract with either the National League or American Association. Some of these players will be later reinstated after they jump back to the PL.
- December 20 – The Toledo Maumees are admitted to the American Association, bringing the AA to five teams.
- December 20 – In the first of many court battles, Charlie Buffinton and Bill Hallman are served with papers for allegedly breaking their contracts with the National League Philadelphia Quakers.
- December 23 – The New York Giants go to court seeking an injunction to prevent John Montgomery Ward from playing baseball for another team in 1890.

== Births ==
=== January–April ===
- January 7 – Leo Murphy
- January 16 – Erskine Mayer^
- January 22 – Amos Strunk
- January 25 – Les Nunamaker
- February 12 – George Cochran
- February 18 – George Mogridge
- March 5 – Jeff Tesreau
- March 12 – Reb Russell
- April 4 – Dutch Lerchen
- April 13 – Claude Hendrix
- April 27 – Hy Myers

^Some sources show 1890

=== May–August ===
- May 7 – Wilson Collins
- May 19 – Wally Snell
- June 1 – Otto Miller
- June 4 – Lee Magee
- July 8 – Pearl Webster
- July 13 – Stan Coveleski
- June 14 – Ray Morgan
- July 16 – Joe Jackson
- June 24 – Paul Musser
- July 28 – Bullet Rogan
- July 31 – Dan Marion
- August 22 – Wally Schang
- August 24 – Hank Gowdy

=== September–December ===
- September 5 – Bingo DeMoss
- September 18 – Heinie Groh
- September 22 – Hooks Dauss
- September 25 – Dave Robertson
- September 28 – Jack Fournier
- October 5 – Jim Bagby
- October 23 – Hugh Bedient
- October 25 – Smoky Joe Wood
- October 26 – Tommy Griffith
- November 24 – George J. Burns
- December 1 – Willie Mitchell
- December 10 – Jimmy Johnston
- December 13 – Fritz Coumbe
- December 14 – Lefty Tyler
- December 19 – Sam Dodge
- December 23 – Cozy Dolan
- December 26 – John Henry

== Deaths ==
- January 15 – Lew Brown, 30, catcher for 1877 NL champion Boston Red Caps and who batted .305 for the 1878 Providence Grays.
- January 26 – Tom Gillen, 26, catcher for the 1884 Philadelphia Keystones of the Union Association.
- February 24 – Jim McElroy, 26, pitched for 2 teams in 1884.
- April 12 – Frank Ringo, 28, journeyman utility player from 1883 to 1886.
- May 20 – Oscar Walker, 35, center fielder and first baseman who led the American Association in home runs with the 1882 St. Louis Browns.
- June 9 – Mike Burke, 35?, reserve for the 1879 Cincinnati Reds.
- June 20 – Pat McGee, age unknown, utility player from 1874 to 1875.
- July 22 – John Greason, 37, back-up pitcher for the 1873 Washington Blue Legs.
- August 8 – Harry McCormick, 33, pitcher who won 41 games from 1879 to 1883.
- September 9 – Jack Gorman, 30?, journeyman utility player in 1883–1884.
