= Bill Sowders =

American baseball player (1864–1951)

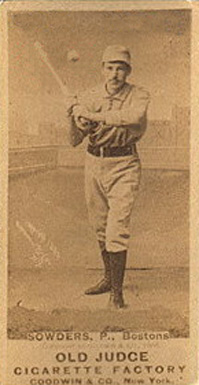
- A sepia photo of Bill Sowders holding a bat in both hands on the right, about to hit the ball
- Pitcher
- Born: November 29, 1864; Louisville, Kentucky, U.S.
- Died: February 2, 1951 (aged 86); Indianapolis, Indiana, U.S.
- Batted: Right Threw: Right

MLB debut
- April 24, 1888, for the Boston Beaneaters

Last MLB appearance
- June 19, 1890, for the Pittsburgh Alleghenys

MLB statistics
- Win–loss record: 29–30
- Earned run average: 3.34
- Strikeouts: 205
- Stats at Baseball Reference

Teams
- Boston Beaneaters (1888–1889); Pittsburgh Alleghenys (1889–1890)

William Jefferson "Little Bill" Sowders (November 29, 1864 – February 2, 1951) was an American professional baseball player. He was a right-handed pitcher over parts of three seasons (1888–1890) with the Boston Beaneaters and Pittsburgh Alleghenys. For his career, he compiled a 29–30 record in 71 appearances, with a 3.34 earned run average and 205 strikeouts.

Sowders was born in Louisville, Kentucky, and later died in Indianapolis at the age of 86. He is buried at Crown Hill Cemetery and Arboretum, Section 32, Lot 165. Two of his brothers, John Sowders and Len Sowders, also played Major League Baseball.

== See also ==
- List of Major League Baseball annual saves leaders
