= Washington Nationals (1886–1889) all-time roster =

List of baseball players

- The following is a list of players and who appeared in at least one game for the fourth of five **Washington Nationals** franchises of Major League Baseball, which played in the National League from 1886 until 1889. Players in **bold** are in the Baseball Hall of Fame.

== A ==
- Tug Arundel

== B ==
- Phil Baker
- Jim Banning
- Bob Barr
- Ed Beecher

== C ==
- Bart Cantz
- Jack Carney
- Cliff Carroll
- Spider Clark
- Harry Clarke
- Larry Corcoran
- Ed Crane
- Sam Crane

== D ==
- Ed Daily
- Hugh Daily
- Tom Daly
- Pat Dealy
- Pat Deasley
- Harry Decker
- Jim Donnelly

== E ==
- Hi Ebright

== F ==
- Jack Farrell
- Alex Ferson
- Davy Force
- John Fox
- Ed Fuller
- Shorty Fuller

== G ==
- Gid Gardner
- Barney Gilligan
- Frank Gilmore
- Buck Gladmon
- Walt Goldsby
- John Greenig

== H ==
- George Haddock
- Jackie Hayes
- Egyptian Healy
- John Henry
- Paul Hines
- Sadie Houck
- Dummy Hoy

== I ==
- Arthur Irwin
- John Irwin

== J ==
- George Joyce

== K ==
- George Keefe
- Tom Kinslow
- Jimmy Knowles
- Bill Krieg
- Gus Krock

== M ==
- **Connie Mack**
- Tony Madigan
- Art McCoy
- John McGlone
- John Morrill
- Miah Murray
- Al Myers

== O ==
- Billy O'Brien
- Pete O'Brien
- Hank O'Day
- Dave Oldfield

== R ==
- John Riddle

== S ==
- Dupee Shaw
- George Shoch
- Joe Start
- Mike Sullivan
- Pete Sweeney

== T ==
- John Thornton

== W ==
- Perry Werden
- Jim Whitney
- Wild Bill Widner
- Walt Wilmot
- George Winkelman
- Bill Wise
- Sam Wise
- Bill Wright

== Y ==
- Joe Yingling

== Z ==
- Henry Zeiher
