= 1886 Washington Nationals season =

1886 Washington Nationals
- League: National League
- Ballpark: Swampoodle Grounds
- City: Washington, D.C.
- Record: 28–92 (.233)
- League place: 8th
- Managers: Michael Scanlon, John Gaffney

The 1886 Washington Nationals finished with a 28–92 record in the National League, finishing in last place in their debut season.

== Regular season ==
=== Season standings ===
National League
Team	W	L	Pct.	GB	Home	Road
Chicago White Stockings	90	34	.726	—	52‍–‍10	38‍–‍24
Detroit Wolverines	87	36	.707	2½	49‍–‍13	38‍–‍23
New York Giants	75	44	.630	12½	47‍–‍12	28‍–‍32
Philadelphia Quakers	71	43	.623	14	45‍–‍14	26‍–‍29
Boston Beaneaters	56	61	.479	30½	32‍–‍26	24‍–‍35
St. Louis Maroons	43	79	.352	46	27‍–‍34	16‍–‍45
Kansas City Cowboys	30	91	.248	58½	17‍–‍40	13‍–‍51
Washington Nationals	28	92	.233	60	19‍–‍43	9‍–‍49

=== Record vs. opponents ===
1886 National League record Sources:
Team	BSN	CHI	DET	KC	NYG	PHI	SLM	WAS
Boston	—	6–12	6–11	11–6	6–11	3–10	11–6–1	13–5
Chicago	12–6	—	11–7	17–1	10–8–1	10–7–1	13–4	17–1
Detroit	11–6	7–11	—	16–2	11–7	10–7–1	15–2–1	17–1–1
Kansas City	6–11	1–17	2–16	—	3–15–1	2–14–1	5–12–2	11–6–1
New York	11–6	8–10–1	7–11	15–3–1	—	8–8–1	15–3	11–3–2
Philadelphia	10–3	7–10–1	7–10–1	14–2–1	8–8–1	—	12–6	13–4–1
St. Louis	6–11–1	4–13	2–15–1	12–5–2	3–15	6–12	—	10–8
Washington	5–13	1–17	1–17–1	6–11–1	3–11–2	4–13–1	8–10	—

=== Roster ===
1886 Washington Nationals
Roster
Pitchers: Bob Barr; Hugh Daily; John Fox; Ed Fuller; Frank Gilmore; John Henry; George Keefe; Tony Madigan; Hank O'Day; Dupee Shaw; Bill Wise; Joe Yingling	Catchers: Harry Decker; Barney Gilligan; Jackie Hayes; Tom Kinslow; Connie Mack; Dave Oldfield; Henry Zeiher; Infielders: Phil Baker; Jack Farrell; Davy Force; Jim Gallagher; Buck Gladmon; Sadie Houck; Jimmy Knowles; Bill Krieg; John McGlone; Joe Start	Outfielders: Cliff Carroll; Larry Corcoran; Ed Crane; Walt Goldsby; Paul Hines; George Joyce; George Shoch; George Winkelman	Manager: John Gaffney; Michael Scanlon

== Player stats ==
=== Batting ===
==== Starters by position ====
Note: Pos = Position; G = Games played; AB = At bats; H = Hits; Avg. = Batting average; HR = Home runs; RBI = Runs batted in

Pos	Player	G	AB	H	Avg.	HR	RBI
C	Barney Gilligan	81	273	52	.190	0	17
1B	Phil Baker	81	325	72	.222	1	34
2B	Jimmy Knowles	115	443	94	.212	3	35
SS	Davy Force	68	242	44	.182	0	16
3B	Buck Gladmon	44	152	21	.138	1	15
OF	Paul Hines	121	487	152	.312	9	56
OF	Ed Crane	80	292	50	.171	0	20
OF	Cliff Carroll	111	433	99	.229	2	22

==== Other batters ====
Note: G = Games played; AB = At bats; H = Hits; Avg. = Batting average; HR = Home runs; RBI = Runs batted in

Player	G	AB	H	Avg.	HR	RBI
Sadie Houck	52	195	42	.215	0	14
Jack Farrell	47	171	41	.240	2	18
Joe Start	31	122	27	.221	0	17
Bill Krieg	27	98	25	.255	1	15
George Shoch	26	95	28	.295	1	18
Jackie Hayes	26	89	17	.191	3	9
Larry Corcoran	21	81	15	.185	0	3
Dave Oldfield	21	71	10	.141	0	2
Connie Mack	10	36	13	.361	0	5
Harry Decker	7	23	5	.217	0	1
Henry Zeiher	6	21	0	.000	0	0
Walt Goldsby	6	18	4	.222	0	1
John McGlone	4	15	1	.067	0	1
Tom Kinslow	3	8	2	.250	0	1
Pete Galligan	1	5	1	.200	0	0
George Joyce	1	0	0	----	0	0

=== Pitching ===
==== Starting pitchers ====
Note: G = Games pitched; IP = Innings pitched; W = Wins; L = Losses; ERA = Earned run average; SO = Strikeouts

Player	G	IP	W	L	ERA	SO
Dupee Shaw	45	385.2	13	31	3.34	177
Bob Barr	23	191.2	3	18	4.41	80
Tony Madigan	14	114.2	1	13	4.87	29
Frank Gilmore	9	75.0	4	4	2.52	75
Ed Crane	10	70.0	1	7	7.20	39
Hank O'Day	6	49.0	2	2	1.65	47
Hugh Daily	6	49.0	0	6	7.35	15
George Keefe	4	31.1	0	3	5.17	5
John Henry	4	27.2	1	3	4.23	19
John Fox	1	8.0	0	1	9.00	3
George Winkelman	1	6.0	0	1	10.50	4
Bill Wise	1	3.0	0	1	9.00	0

==== Other pitchers ====
Note: G = Games pitched; IP = Innings pitched; W = Wins; L = Losses; ERA = Earned run average; SO = Strikeouts

Player	G	IP	W	L	ERA	SO
Larry Corcoran	2	14.0	0	1	5.79	3
Ed Fuller	2	13.0	0	1	6.92	3

==== Relief pitchers ====
Note: G = Games pitched; W = Wins; L = Losses; SV = Saves; ERA = Earned run average; SO = Strikeouts

Player	G	W	L	SV	ERA	SO
Joe Yingling	1	0	0	0	12.00	1
