= 1886 New York Giants season =

1886 New York Giants
- League: National League
- Ballpark: Polo Grounds
- City: New York City
- Record: 75–44 (.630)
- League place: 3rd
- Owner: John B. Day
- Manager: Jim Mutrie

The 1886 New York Giants season was the franchise's fourth season. The team had a record of 75–44, finishing third in the National League, 12.5 games behind the Chicago White Stockings.

== Regular season ==
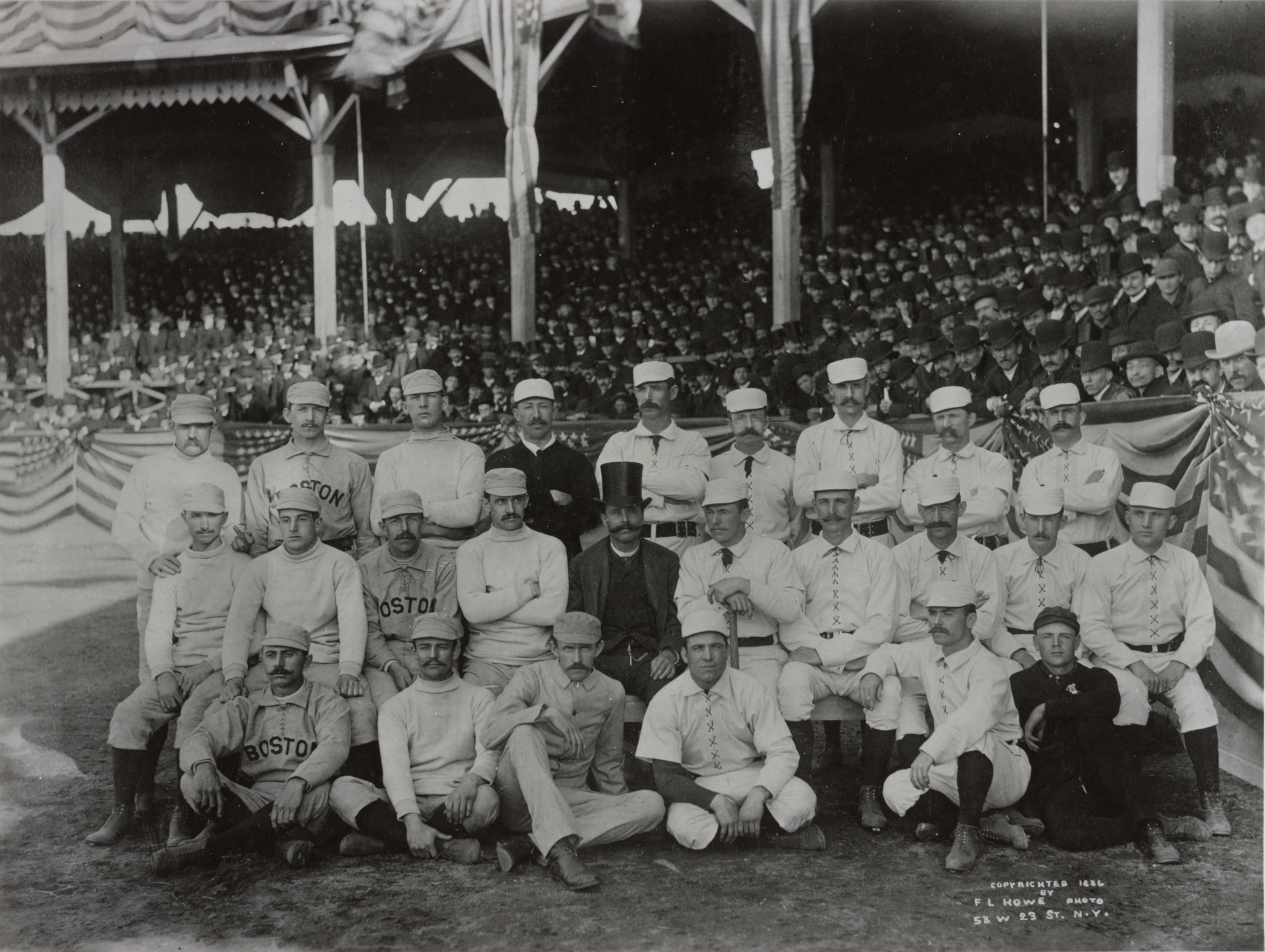
Opening Day photo, Boston Beaneaters and New York Giants

=== Season standings ===
National League
Team	W	L	Pct.	GB	Home	Road
Chicago White Stockings	90	34	.726	—	52‍–‍10	38‍–‍24
Detroit Wolverines	87	36	.707	2½	49‍–‍13	38‍–‍23
New York Giants	75	44	.630	12½	47‍–‍12	28‍–‍32
Philadelphia Quakers	71	43	.623	14	45‍–‍14	26‍–‍29
Boston Beaneaters	56	61	.479	30½	32‍–‍26	24‍–‍35
St. Louis Maroons	43	79	.352	46	27‍–‍34	16‍–‍45
Kansas City Cowboys	30	91	.248	58½	17‍–‍40	13‍–‍51
Washington Nationals	28	92	.233	60	19‍–‍43	9‍–‍49

=== Record vs. opponents ===
1886 National League record Sources:
Team	BSN	CHI	DET	KC	NYG	PHI	SLM	WAS
Boston	—	6–12	6–11	11–6	6–11	3–10	11–6–1	13–5
Chicago	12–6	—	11–7	17–1	10–8–1	10–7–1	13–4	17–1
Detroit	11–6	7–11	—	16–2	11–7	10–7–1	15–2–1	17–1–1
Kansas City	6–11	1–17	2–16	—	3–15–1	2–14–1	5–12–2	11–6–1
New York	11–6	8–10–1	7–11	15–3–1	—	8–8–1	15–3	11–3–2
Philadelphia	10–3	7–10–1	7–10–1	14–2–1	8–8–1	—	12–6	13–4–1
St. Louis	6–11–1	4–13	2–15–1	12–5–2	3–15	6–12	—	10–8
Washington	5–13	1–17	1–17–1	6–11–1	3–11–2	4–13–1	8–10	—

=== Roster ===
1886 New York Giants
Roster
Pitchers: Jim Devlin; Tim Keefe; Mickey Welch; Catchers: Gene Bagley; Pat Deasley; Buck Ewing	Infielders: Ed Caskin; Roger Connor; Dude Esterbrook; Joe Gerhardt; John Ward	Outfielders: Larry Corcoran; Frank Diven; Mike Dorgan; Bill Finley; Pete Gillespie; Jim O'Rourke; Danny Richardson	Manager: Jim Mutrie

== Player stats ==
=== Batting ===
==== Starters by position ====
Note: Pos = Position; G = Games played; AB = At bats; H = Hits; Avg. = Batting average; HR = Home runs; RBI = Runs batted in

Pos	Player	G	AB	H	Avg.	HR	RBI
C	Buck Ewing	73	275	85	.309	4	31
1B	Roger Connor	118	485	172	.355	7	71
2B	Joe Gerhardt	123	426	81	.190	0	40
SS	John Montgomery Ward	122	491	134	.273	2	81
3B	Dude Esterbrook	123	473	125	.264	3	43
OF	Mike Dorgan	118	442	129	.292	2	79
OF	Patrick Gillespie	97	396	108	.273	0	58
OF	Jim O'Rourke	105	440	136	.309	1	34

==== Other batters ====
Note: G = Games played; AB = At bats; H = Hits; Avg. = Batting average; HR = Home runs; RBI = Runs batted in

Player	G	AB	H	Avg.	HR	RBI
Danny Richardson	68	237	55	.232	1	27
Pat Deasley	41	143	38	.266	0	17
Bill Finley	13	44	8	.182	0	5
Gene Bagley	5	16	2	.125	0	1
Ed Caskin	1	4	2	.500	0	1
Larry Corcoran	1	4	0	.000	0	0
Frank Diven	1	3	0	.000	0	0

=== Pitching ===
==== Starting pitchers ====
Note: G = Games pitched; IP = Innings pitched; W = Wins; L = Losses; ERA = Earned run average; SO = Strikeouts

Player	G	IP	W	L	ERA	SO
Tim Keefe	64	535.0	42	20	2.56	297
Mickey Welch	59	500.0	33	22	2.99	272

==== Other pitchers ====
Note: G = Games pitched; IP = Innings pitched; W = Wins; L = Losses; ERA = Earned run average; SO = Strikeouts

Player	G	IP	W	L	ERA	SO
Danny Richardson	5	25.0	0	2	5.76	17

==== Relief pitchers ====
Note: G = Games pitched; W = Wins; L = Losses; SV = Saves; ERA = Earned run average; SO = Strikeouts

Player	G	W	L	SV	ERA	SO
Jim Devlin	1	0	0	1	18.00	2
