= 1886 St. Louis Maroons season =

1886 St. Louis Maroons
- League: National League
- Ballpark: Sportsman's Park
- City: St. Louis, Missouri
- Record: 43–79 (.352)
- League place: 6th
- Owner: Henry Lucas
- Manager: Gus Schmelz

The 1886 St. Louis Maroons finished with a 43–79 record in the National League, finishing in sixth place. After the season, the team was purchased by John T. Brush and moved to Indianapolis, becoming the Hoosiers.

== Regular season ==
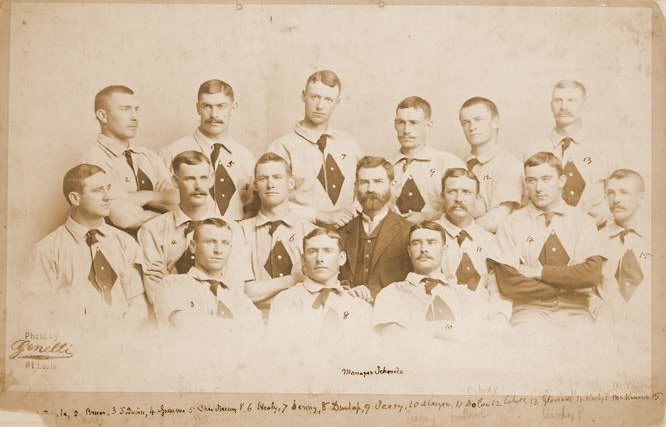
The 1886 St. Louis Maroons

=== Season standings ===
National League
| Team | W | L | Pct. | GB | Home | Road |
|---|---|---|---|---|---|---|
| Chicago White Stockings | 90 | 34 | .726 | — | 52‍–‍10 | 38‍–‍24 |
| Detroit Wolverines | 87 | 36 | .707 | 2½ | 49‍–‍13 | 38‍–‍23 |
| New York Giants | 75 | 44 | .630 | 12½ | 47‍–‍12 | 28‍–‍32 |
| Philadelphia Quakers | 71 | 43 | .623 | 14 | 45‍–‍14 | 26‍–‍29 |
| Boston Beaneaters | 56 | 61 | .479 | 30½ | 32‍–‍26 | 24‍–‍35 |
| St. Louis Maroons | 43 | 79 | .352 | 46 | 27‍–‍34 | 16‍–‍45 |
| Kansas City Cowboys | 30 | 91 | .248 | 58½ | 17‍–‍40 | 13‍–‍51 |
| Washington Nationals | 28 | 92 | .233 | 60 | 19‍–‍43 | 9‍–‍49 |

=== Record vs. opponents ===
1886 National League record Sources:
| Team | BSN | CHI | DET | KC | NYG | PHI | SLM | WAS |
|---|---|---|---|---|---|---|---|---|
| Boston | — | 6–12 | 6–11 | 11–6 | 6–11 | 3–10 | 11–6–1 | 13–5 |
| Chicago | 12–6 | — | 11–7 | 17–1 | 10–8–1 | 10–7–1 | 13–4 | 17–1 |
| Detroit | 11–6 | 7–11 | — | 16–2 | 11–7 | 10–7–1 | 15–2–1 | 17–1–1 |
| Kansas City | 6–11 | 1–17 | 2–16 | — | 3–15–1 | 2–14–1 | 5–12–2 | 11–6–1 |
| New York | 11–6 | 8–10–1 | 7–11 | 15–3–1 | — | 8–8–1 | 15–3 | 11–3–2 |
| Philadelphia | 10–3 | 7–10–1 | 7–10–1 | 14–2–1 | 8–8–1 | — | 12–6 | 13–4–1 |
| St. Louis | 6–11–1 | 4–13 | 2–15–1 | 12–5–2 | 3–15 | 6–12 | — | 10–8 |
| Washington | 5–13 | 1–17 | 1–17–1 | 6–11–1 | 3–11–2 | 4–13–1 | 8–10 | — |

=== Roster ===
1886 St. Louis Maroons
Roster
| Pitchers: Al Bauer; Henry Boyle; Egyptian Healy; John Kirby; Joe Murphy; Jeremiah Reardon; Charlie Sweeney | Catchers: Tom Dolan; Frank Graves; George Mappes; George Myers; Infielders: Sam Crane; Jerry Denny; Fred Dunlap; Jack Glasscock; Alex McKinnon | Outfielders: John Cahill; Red Connally; Jack McGeachey; Louis Pelouze; Joe Quinn; Emmett Seery | Manager: Gus Schmelz |

== Player stats ==
=== Batting ===
==== Starters by position ====
Note: Pos = Position; G = Games played; AB = At bats; H = Hits; Avg. = Batting average; HR = Home runs; RBI = Runs batted in

| Pos | Player | G | AB | H | Avg. | HR | RBI |
|---|---|---|---|---|---|---|---|
| C | George Myers | 79 | 295 | 56 | .190 | 0 | 27 |
| 1B | Alex McKinnon | 122 | 491 | 148 | .301 | 8 | 72 |
| 2B | Fred Dunlap | 71 | 285 | 76 | .267 | 3 | 32 |
| SS | Jack Glasscock | 121 | 486 | 158 | .325 | 3 | 40 |
| 3B | Jerry Denny | 119 | 478 | 122 | .257 | 9 | 62 |
| OF | Emmett Seery | 126 | 453 | 108 | .238 | 2 | 48 |
| OF | John Cahill | 125 | 463 | 92 | .199 | 1 | 32 |
| OF | Jack McGeachey | 59 | 226 | 46 | .204 | 2 | 24 |

==== Other batters ====
Note: G = Games played; AB = At bats; H = Hits; Avg. = Batting average; HR = Home runs; RBI = Runs batted in

| Player | G | AB | H | Avg. | HR | RBI |
|---|---|---|---|---|---|---|
| Joe Quinn | 75 | 271 | 63 | .232 | 1 | 21 |
| Frank Graves | 43 | 138 | 21 | .152 | 0 | 9 |
| Sam Crane | 39 | 116 | 20 | .172 | 0 | 7 |
| Charlie Sweeney | 17 | 64 | 16 | .250 | 0 | 7 |
| Tom Dolan | 15 | 44 | 11 | .250 | 0 | 1 |
| George Mappes | 6 | 14 | 2 | .143 | 0 | 0 |
| Red Connally | 2 | 7 | 0 | .000 | 0 | 0 |
| Louis Pelouze | 1 | 3 | 0 | .000 | 0 | 0 |

=== Pitching ===
==== Starting pitchers ====
Note: G = Games pitched; IP = Innings pitched; W = Wins; L = Losses; ERA = Earned run average; SO = Strikeouts

| Player | G | IP | W | L | ERA | SO |
|---|---|---|---|---|---|---|
| Egyptian Healy | 43 | 353.2 | 17 | 23 | 2.88 | 213 |
| John Kirby | 41 | 325.0 | 11 | 26 | 3.30 | 129 |
| Henry Boyle | 25 | 210.0 | 9 | 15 | 1.76 | 101 |
| Charlie Sweeney | 11 | 93.0 | 5 | 6 | 4.16 | 28 |
| Joe Murphy | 4 | 33.0 | 0 | 4 | 8.18 | 11 |
| Al Bauer | 4 | 28.2 | 0 | 4 | 5.97 | 13 |
| Jeremiah Reardon | 1 | 8.0 | 0 | 1 | 6.75 | 0 |

==== Relief pitchers ====
Note: G = Games pitched; W = Wins; L = Losses; SV = Saves; ERA = Earned run average; SO = Strikeouts

| Player | G | W | L | SV | ERA | SO |
|---|---|---|---|---|---|---|
| John Cahill | 2 | 1 | 0 | 0 | 3.00 | 2 |
| Emmett Seery | 2 | 0 | 0 | 0 | 7.71 | 2 |
| Frank Graves | 1 | 0 | 0 | 0 | 9.00 | 2 |
