= 1886 Detroit Wolverines season =

1886 Detroit Wolverines
- League: National League
- Ballpark: Recreation Park
- City: Detroit, Michigan
- Record: 87–36 (.707)
- League place: 2nd
- Owner: Frederick K. Stearns
- Manager: Bill Watkins

The 1886 Detroit Wolverines had the best winning percentage of any major league baseball team to play in Detroit. They compiled a record of 87–36 for a .707 winning percentage. Nevertheless, the Wolverines finished in second place, 2½ games behind the Chicago White Stockings.

== Regular season ==
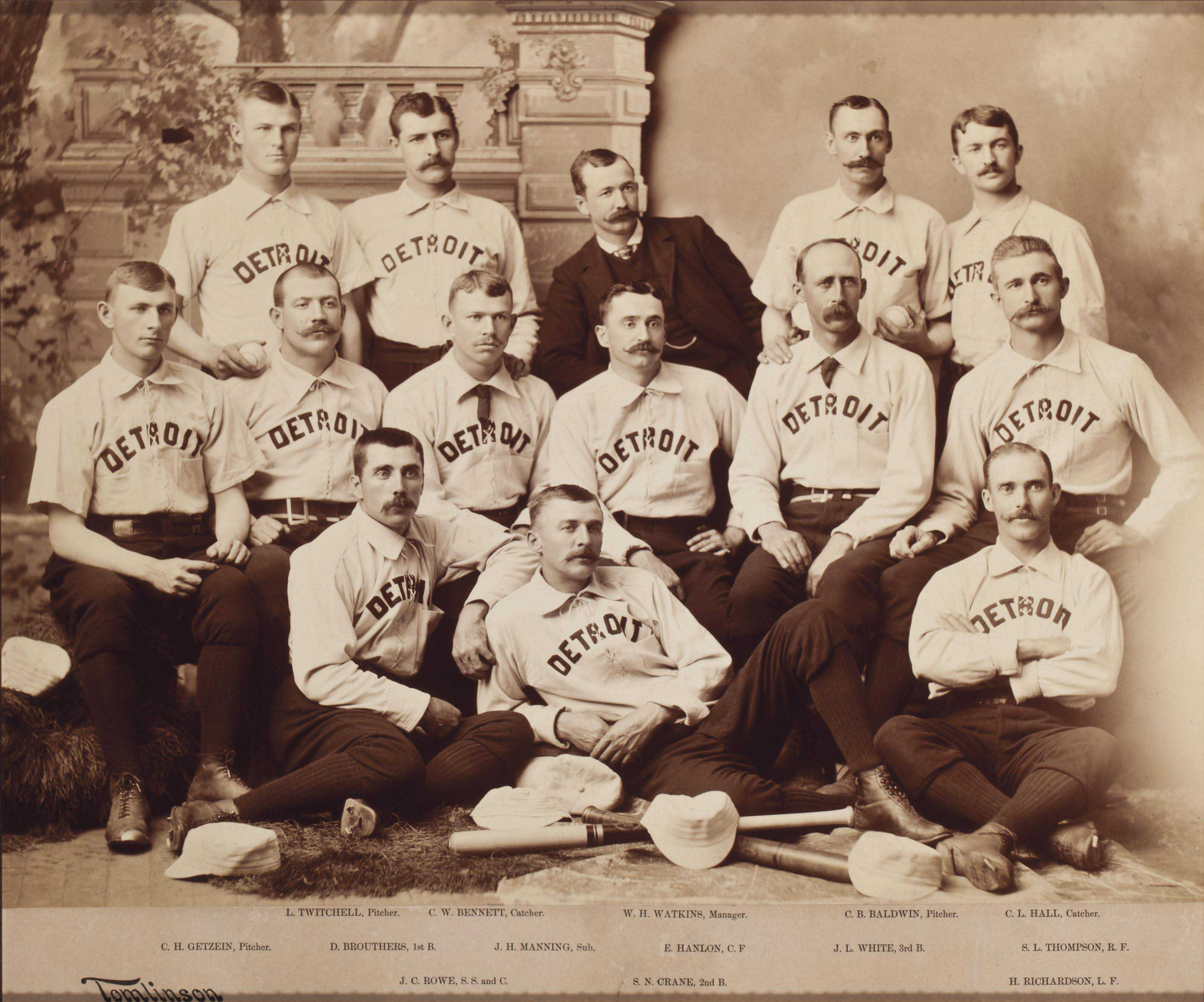
1886 Detroit Wolverines

=== Season standings ===
National League
Team	W	L	Pct.	GB	Home	Road
Chicago White Stockings	90	34	.726	—	52‍–‍10	38‍–‍24
Detroit Wolverines	87	36	.707	2½	49‍–‍13	38‍–‍23
New York Giants	75	44	.630	12½	47‍–‍12	28‍–‍32
Philadelphia Quakers	71	43	.623	14	45‍–‍14	26‍–‍29
Boston Beaneaters	56	61	.479	30½	32‍–‍26	24‍–‍35
St. Louis Maroons	43	79	.352	46	27‍–‍34	16‍–‍45
Kansas City Cowboys	30	91	.248	58½	17‍–‍40	13‍–‍51
Washington Nationals	28	92	.233	60	19‍–‍43	9‍–‍49

=== Record vs. opponents ===
1886 National League record Sources:
Team	BSN	CHI	DET	KC	NYG	PHI	SLM	WAS
Boston	—	6–12	6–11	11–6	6–11	3–10	11–6–1	13–5
Chicago	12–6	—	11–7	17–1	10–8–1	10–7–1	13–4	17–1
Detroit	11–6	7–11	—	16–2	11–7	10–7–1	15–2–1	17–1–1
Kansas City	6–11	1–17	2–16	—	3–15–1	2–14–1	5–12–2	11–6–1
New York	11–6	8–10–1	7–11	15–3–1	—	8–8–1	15–3	11–3–2
Philadelphia	10–3	7–10–1	7–10–1	14–2–1	8–8–1	—	12–6	13–4–1
St. Louis	6–11–1	4–13	2–15–1	12–5–2	3–15	6–12	—	10–8
Washington	5–13	1–17	1–17–1	6–11–1	3–11–2	4–13–1	8–10	—

=== Roster ===
1886 Detroit Wolverines
Roster
Pitchers: Lady Baldwin; Pete Conway; Pretzels Getzien; Billy Smith; Phenomenal Smith; Larry Twitchell	Catchers: Charlie Bennett; Harry Decker; Charlie Ganzel; Tom Gillen; Infielders: Dan Brouthers; Sam Crane; Fred Dunlap; Jack Rowe; Billy Shindle; Deacon White	Outfielders: Ned Hanlon; Jim Manning; Jack McGeachey; Hardy Richardson; Sam Thompson	Manager: Bill Watkins

== Player stats ==
=== Batting ===
==== Starters by position ====
Note: Pos = Position; G = Games played; AB = At bats; R = Runs; H = Hits; Avg. = Batting average; Slg. = Slugging percentage; HR = Home runs; RBI = Runs batted in

Pos	Player	G	AB	R	H	Avg.	Slg.	HR	RBI
C	Charlie Bennett	72	235	37	57	.243	.391	4	34
1B	Dan Brouthers	121	489	139	181	.370	.581	11	72
2B	Fred Dunlap	51	196	32	56	.286	.418	4	37
3B	Deacon White	124	491	65	142	.289	.354	1	76
SS	Jack Rowe	111	468	97	142	.303	.425	6	87
OF	Sam Thompson	122	503	101	156	.310	.445	8	89
OF	Ned Hanlon	126	494	105	116	.235	.296	4	60
OF	Hardy Richardson	125	538	125	189	.351	.504	11	61

==== Other batters ====
Note: G = Games played; AB = At bats; R = Runs; H = Hits; Avg. = Batting average; Slg. = Slugging percentage; HR = Home runs; RBI = Runs batted in

Player	G	AB	R	H	Avg.	Slg.	HR	RBI
Charlie Ganzel	57	213	28	58	.272	.338	0	51
Sam Crane	47	185	24	26	.141	.189	1	12
Jim Manning	26	97	14	18	.186	.268	0	7
Harry Decker	14	54	2	12	.222	.250	0	5
Jack McGeachey	6	27	3	9	.333	.333	0	4
Billy Shindle	7	26	4	7	.269	.269	0	4
Tom Gillen	2	10	2	4	.400	.400	0	4

Note: pitchers' batting statistics not included

=== Pitching ===
==== Starting pitchers ====
Note: G = Games; IP = Innings pitched; W = Wins; L = Losses; ERA = Earned run average; SO = Strikeouts

Player	G	IP	W	L	ERA	SO
Lady Baldwin	56	487.0	42	13	2.24	323
Pretzels Getzien	43	386.2	30	11	3.03	172
Pete Conway	11	91.0	6	5	3.36	35
Billy Smith	9	77.0	5	4	4.09	36
Phenomenal Smith	3	25.0	1	1	2.16	15
Larry Twitchell	4	25.0	0	2	6.48	6

==== Relief pitchers ====
Note: G = Games pitched; W = Wins; L = Losses; SV = Saves; ERA = Earned run average; SO = Strikeouts

Player	G	W	L	SV	ERA	SO
Hardy Richardson	4	3	0	0	4.50	5

== Awards and honors ==
=== League top ten finishers ===
Lady Baldwin

- NL leader in wins (42)
- NL leader in strikeouts (323)
- NL leader in shutouts (7)
- NL leader in walks plus hits per 9 innings pitched (WHIP) (0.967)
- NL leader in hits allowed per 9 innings pitched (6.86)
- #3 in NL in ERA (2.24)
- #3 in NL in win percentage (.764)
- #2 in NL in strikeouts to walks (3.23)
- #3 in NL in strikeouts per 9 innings pitched (5.97)
- #4 in NL in games (56)
- #4 in NL in innings pitched (487)
- #4 in NL in games started (56)
- #4 in NL in complete games (55)
- #5 in NL in walks per 9 innings pitched (1.85)
- #5 in NL in Adjusted ERA+ (147)

Dan Brouthers

- NL leader in slugging percentage (.581)
- NL leader in OPS (1.026)
- NL leader in total bases (284)
- NL leader in doubles (40)
- NL leader in home runs (11) (tied with Richardson)
- NL leader in runs created (126)
- NL leader in extra base hits (66)
- NL leader in at bats per home run (44.5)
- #2 in NL in on-base percentage (.445)
- #2 in NL in triples (15)
- #2 in NL in times on base (247)
- #3 in NL in Power/Speed Number (14.4)
- #3 in NL in at bats per strikeout (30.6)
- #3 in NL in batting average (.370)
- #3 in NL in plate appearances (555)
- #3 in NL in runs scored (139)
- #3 in NL in hits (181)
- #4 in NL in runs scored (125)
- #4 in NL in bases on balls (66)

Pretzels Getzien

- #5 in NL in win percentage (.732)

Ned Hanlon

- NL leader in games played (126)
- #2 in NL in outs (378)
- #3 in NL in stolen bases (50)
- #4 in NL in plate appearances (551)
- #5 in NL in at bats (494)

Hardy Richardson

- NL leader in at bats (538)
- NL leader in plate appearances (584)
- NL leader in hits (189)
- NL leader in home runs (11) (tied with Brouthers)
- NL leader in singles (140)
- NL leader in Power/Speed Number (17.4)
- #2 in NL in at bats per home run (48.9)
- #2 in NL in games finished (pitcher) (4)
- #3 in NL in games played (125)
- #3 in NL in total bases (271)
- #3 in NL in stolen bases (42)
- #4 in NL in runs created (109)
- #4 in NL in extra base hits (49)
- #5 in NL in times on base (235)
- #5 in NL in batting average (.351)
- #5 in NL in slugging percentage (.504)
- #5 in NL in OPS (.906)

Jack Rowe

- #4 in NL in RBIs (87)

Sam Thompson

- NL leader in double plays by an outfielder (11)
- #3 in NL in at bats (503)
- #3 in NL in RBIs (89)
- #4 in NL in singles (117)

Deacon White

- #4 in NL in singles (117)
- 3rd oldest player in NL (38)

=== Players Ranking Among Top 100 of All Time at Position ===
The following members of the 1886 Detroit Wolverines are among the Top 100 of all time at their positions, as ranked by The New Bill James Historical Baseball Abstract in 2001:

- Charlie Bennett: 49th best catcher of all time
- Dan Brouthers: 18th best first baseman of all time
- Fred Dunlap: 89th best second baseman of all time
- Hardy Richardson: 39th best second baseman of all time
- Deacon White: 76th best third baseman of all time
- Billy Shindle: 95th best third baseman of all time (played only 7 games for the 1886 Wolverines)
- Sam Thompson: 37th best right fielder of all time
