= List of Major League Baseball players (Z) =

The following is a list of Major League Baseball players, retired or active. As of the end of the 2025 season, there have been 103 players with a last name that begins with Z who have been on a major league roster at some point.

== Z ==
Name	Debut	Final game	Position	Teams	Ref
Adrián Zabala	August 11, 1945	September 24, 1949	Pitcher	New York Giants	
Aneurys Zabala	June 12, 2022	August 1, 2022	Pitcher	Miami Marlins	
Zip Zabel	October 5, 1913	September 29, 1915	Pitcher	Chicago Cubs	
Albert Zachary	April 25, 1944	September 28, 1944	Pitcher	Brooklyn Dodgers	
Chris Zachary	April 11, 1963	September 29, 1973	Pitcher	Houston Astros, Kansas City Royals, St. Louis Cardinals, Detroit Tigers, Pittsburgh Pirates	
Tom Zachary	July 11, 1918	May 28, 1936	Pitcher	Philadelphia Athletics, Washington Senators, St. Louis Browns, New York Yankees, Boston Braves, Brooklyn Dodgers, Philadelphia Phillies	
Elmer Zacher	April 30, 1910	August 25, 1910	Outfielder	New York Giants, St. Louis Cardinals	
Pat Zachry	April 11, 1976	May 29, 1985	Pitcher	Cincinnati Reds, New York Mets, Los Angeles Dodgers, Philadelphia Phillies	
George Zackert	September 22, 1911	July 17, 1912	Pitcher	St. Louis Cardinals	
Mark Zagunis	June 22, 2017	August 18, 2019	Outfielder	Chicago Cubs	
Mike Zagurski	May 25, 2007	July 7, 2018	Pitcher	Philadelphia Phillies, Arizona Diamondbacks, Pittsburgh Pirates, New York Yankees, Milwaukee Brewers	
Geoff Zahn	September 2, 1973	August 14, 1985	Pitcher	Los Angeles Dodgers, Chicago Cubs, Minnesota Twins, California Angels	
Fred Zahner	July 23, 1894	August 5, 1895	Catcher	Louisville Colonels	
Paul Zahniser	May 18, 1923	April 19, 1929	Pitcher	Washington Senators, Boston Red Sox, Cincinnati Reds	
Frankie Zak	April 21, 1944	June 10, 1946	Shortstop	Pittsburgh Pirates	
Jack Zalusky	September 4, 1903	September 29, 1903	Catcher	New York Highlanders	
Carlos Zambrano	August 20, 2001	September 21, 2012	Pitcher	Chicago Cubs	
Eduardo Zambrano	September 19, 1993	August 10, 1994	Outfielder	Chicago Cubs	
Víctor Zambrano	June 21, 2001	September 30, 2007	Pitcher	Tampa Bay Devil Rays, New York Mets, Toronto Blue Jays, Baltimore Orioles	
Carl Zamloch	May 7, 1913	July 9, 1913	Pitcher	Detroit Tigers	
Oscar Zamora	June 18, 1974	July 21, 1978	Pitcher	Chicago Cubs, Houston Astros	
Dom Zanni	September 28, 1958	October 1, 1966	Pitcher	San Francisco Giants, Chicago White Sox, Cincinnati Reds	
Joe Zapustas	September 28, 1933	September 30, 1933	Outfielder	Philadelphia Athletics	
Mauro Zárate	August 7, 2007	September 29, 2007	Pitcher	Florida Marlins	
José Zardón	April 18, 1945	September 16, 1945	Outfielder	Washington Senators	
Al Zarilla	June 30, 1943	September 26, 1953	Outfielder	St. Louis Browns, Boston Red Sox, Chicago White Sox	
Jeff Zaske	July 21, 1984	July 28, 1984	Pitcher	Pittsburgh Pirates	
Rob Zastryzny	August 19, 2016		Pitcher	Chicago Cubs, New York Mets, Los Angeles Angels, Pittsburgh Pirates, Milwaukee Brewers	
Norm Zauchin	September 23, 1951	May 2, 1959	First baseman	Boston Red Sox, Washington Senators	
Gregg Zaun	June 24, 1995	May 20, 2010	Catcher	Baltimore Orioles, Florida Marlins, Texas Rangers, Kansas City Royals, Houston Astros, Colorado Rockies, Toronto Blue Jays, Tampa Bay Rays, Milwaukee Brewers	
Clay Zavada	May 21, 2009	October 2, 2009	Pitcher	Arizona Diamondbacks	
Seby Zavala	May 25, 2019		Catcher	Chicago White Sox, Arizona Diamondbacks, Seattle Mariners	
Clint Zavaras	June 3, 1989	September 24, 1989	Pitcher	Seattle Mariners	
Lance Zawadzki	May 2, 2010	June 20, 2010	Pitcher	San Diego Padres	
William Zay	October 7, 1886	October 7, 1886	Pitcher	Baltimore Orioles (19th century)	
Joe Zdeb	April 7, 1977	May 29, 1979	Outfielder	Kansas City Royals	
Dave Zearfoss	April 17, 1896	July 8, 1905	Catcher	New York Giants, St. Louis Cardinals	
George Zeber	May 7, 1977	June 14, 1978	Second baseman	New York Yankees	
Ryan Zeferjahn	August 25, 2024		Pitcher	Los Angeles Angels	
Josh Zeid	July 30, 2013	July 24, 2014	Pitcher	Houston Astros	
Rollie Zeider	April 14, 1910	August 29, 1918	Utility infielder	Chicago White Sox, New York Yankees, Chicago Chi-Feds/Whales, Chicago Cubs	
Henry Zeiher	June 24, 1886	July 5, 1886	Catcher	Washington Nationals (1886–89)	
Todd Zeile	August 18, 1989	October 3, 2004	Third baseman	St. Louis Cardinals, Chicago Cubs, Philadelphia Phillies, Baltimore Orioles, Los Angeles Dodgers, Florida Marlins, Texas Rangers, New York Mets, Colorado Rockies, New York Yankees, Montreal Expos	
Matt Zeiser	April 27, 1914	May 11, 1914	Pitcher	Boston Red Sox	
Bart Zeller	May 21, 1970	May 21, 1970	Catcher	St. Louis Cardinals	
Bill Zepp	August 12, 1969	June 20, 1971	Pitcher	Minnesota Twins, Detroit Tigers	
Chad Zerbe	September 18, 2000	September 27, 2003	Pitcher	San Francisco Giants	
Gus Zernial	April 19, 1949	September 25, 1959	Outfielder	Chicago White Sox, Philadelphia Athletics, Kansas City Athletics, Detroit Tigers	
Ángel Zerpa	September 30, 2021		Pitcher	Kansas City Royals	
George Zettlein	May 8, 1871	September 16, 1876	Pitcher	Chicago White Stockings, Troy Haymakers, Eckford of Brooklyn, Philadelphia White Stockings, Philadelphia Athletics (1860–76)	
T. J. Zeuch	September 3, 2019	August 24, 2022	Pitcher	Toronto Blue Jays, Cincinnati Reds	
Bob Zick	May 2, 1954	September 6, 1954	Pitcher	Chicago Cubs	
Brad Ziegler	May 31, 2008	September 29, 2018	Pitcher	Oakland Athletics, Arizona Diamondbacks, Boston Red Sox, Miami Marlins	
Charlie Ziegler	September 23, 1899	June 6, 1900	Third baseman	Cleveland Spiders, Philadelphia Phillies	
George Ziegler	June 19, 1890	June 19, 1890	Pitcher	Pittsburgh Alleghenys	
Steve Ziem	April 30, 1987	May 1, 1987	Pitcher	Atlanta Braves	
Benny Zientara	September 11, 1941	September 23, 1948	Second baseman	Cincinnati Reds	
Bill Zies	August 9, 1891	August 10, 1891	Catcher	St. Louis Browns (1882–1900)	
Bradley Zimmer	May 16, 2017	October 5, 2022	Outfielder	Cleveland Indians	
Chief Zimmer	July 18, 1884	September 27, 1903	Catcher	Detroit Wolverines, New York Metropolitans, Cleveland Blues, Louisville Colonels, Pittsburgh Pirates, Philadelphia Phillies	
Don Zimmer	July 2, 1954	October 2, 1965	Utility infielder	Brooklyn Dodgers, Los Angeles Dodgers, Chicago Cubs, New York Mets, Cincinnati Reds, Washington Senators (1961–1971)	
Kyle Zimmer	March 31, 2019	October 2, 2021	Pitcher	Kansas City Royals	
Bill Zimmerman	April 14, 1915	July 9, 1915	Outfielder	Brooklyn Robins	
Eddie Zimmerman	September 29, 1906	September 4, 1911	Third baseman	St. Louis Cardinals, Brooklyn Dodgers	
Heinie Zimmerman	September 8, 1907	September 10, 1919	Third baseman	Chicago Cubs, New York Giants	
Jeff Zimmerman	April 13, 1999	October 7, 2001	Pitcher	Texas Rangers	
Jerry Zimmerman	April 14, 1961	September 22, 1968	Catcher	Cincinnati Reds, Minnesota Twins	
Jordan Zimmerman	May 17, 1999	July 2, 1999	Pitcher	Seattle Mariners	
Roy Zimmerman	September 2, 1945	September 30, 1945	First baseman	New York Giants	
Ryan Zimmerman	September 1, 2005	October 3, 2021	Third baseman	Washington Nationals	
Bruce Zimmermann	September 17, 2020		Pitcher	Baltimore Orioles	
Jordan Zimmermann	April 20, 2009	May 7, 2021	Pitcher	Washington Nationals, Detroit Tigers	
Charlie Zink	August 12, 2008	August 12, 2008	Pitcher	Boston Red Sox	
Walter Zink	July 6, 1921	July 19, 1921	Pitcher	New York Giants	
Frank Zinn	April 18, 1888	May 3, 1988	Catcher	Philadelphia Athletics (American Association)	
Guy Zinn	September 11, 1911	September 16, 1915	Outfielder	New York Highlanders, Boston Braves, Baltimore Terrapins	
Jimmy Zinn	September 4, 1919	August 25, 1929	Pitcher	Philadelphia Athletics, Pittsburgh Pirates, Cleveland Indians	
Bill Zinser	August 19, 1944	August 26, 1944	Pitcher	Washington Senators	
Alan Zinter	June 18, 2002	October 3, 2004	First baseman	Houston Astros, Arizona Diamondbacks	
Bud Zipfel	July 26, 1961	September 30, 1962	First baseman	Washington Senators (1961–1971)	
Richie Zisk	September 8, 1971	September 21, 1983	Outfielder	Pittsburgh Pirates, Chicago White Sox, Texas Rangers, Seattle Mariners	
Barry Zito	July 22, 2000	September 30, 2015	Pitcher	Oakland Athletics, San Francisco Giants	
Billy Zitzmann	April 17, 1919	September 25, 1929	Outfielder	Pittsburgh Pirates, Cincinnati Reds	
Ed Zmich	July 23, 1910	June 2, 1911	Pitcher	St. Louis Cardinals	
Ben Zobrist	August 1, 2006	September 29, 2019	Shortstop	Tampa Bay Devil Rays/Rays, Oakland Athletics, Kansas City Royals, Chicago Cubs	
Pete Zoccolillo	September 5, 2003	September 28, 2003	Outfielder	Milwaukee Brewers	
Sam Zoldak	May 13, 1944	August 26, 1952	Pitcher	St. Louis Browns, Cleveland Indians, Philadelphia Athletics	
Eddie Zosky	September 2, 1991	October 1, 2000	Shortstop	Toronto Blue Jays, Florida Marlins, Milwaukee Brewers, Houston Astros	
Bill Zuber	September 16, 1936	September 23, 1947	Pitcher	Cleveland Indians, Washington Senators, New York Yankees, Boston Red Sox	
Jon Zuber	April 19, 1996	September 27, 1998	First baseman	Philadelphia Phillies	
Tyler Zuber	July 24, 2020		Pitcher	Kansas City Royals, Tampa Bay Rays, New York Mets, Miami Marlins	
Julio Zuleta	April 6, 2000	June 25, 2001	First baseman	Chicago Cubs	
Yosver Zulueta	June 25, 2024		Pitcher	Cincinnati Reds	
Joel Zumaya	April 3, 2006	June 28, 2010	Pitcher	Detroit Tigers	
Guillo Zuñiga	May 2, 2023		Pitcher	St. Louis Cardinals, Los Angeles Angels	
Mike Zunino	June 2, 2013	June 14, 2023	Catcher	Seattle Mariners	
Bob Zupcic	September 7, 1991	August 4, 1994	Outfielder	Boston Red Sox, Chicago White Sox	
Frank Zupo	July 1, 1957	May 9, 1961	Catcher	Baltimore Orioles	
Paul Zuvella	September 4, 1982	May 2, 1991	Shortstop	Atlanta Braves, New York Yankees, Cleveland Indians, Kansas City Royals	
George Zuverink	April 21, 1951	June 15, 1959	Pitcher	Cleveland Indians, Cincinnati Reds, Detroit Tigers, Baltimore Orioles	
Dutch Zwilling	August 14, 1910	July 12, 1916	Outfielder	Chicago White Sox, Chicago Chi-Feds/Whales, Chicago Cubs	
Tony Zych	September 4, 2015	August 19, 2017	Pitcher	Seattle Mariners	
