= 1886 Kansas City Cowboys season =

1886 Kansas City Cowboys
- League: National League
- Ballpark: Association Park
- City: Kansas City, Missouri
- Record: 30–91 (.248)
- League place: 7th
- Manager: Dave Rowe

The 1886 Kansas City Cowboys was a season in American baseball. The team had a 30–91 record in the National League, finishing in seventh place. This was the only season this version of the team existed, as the team went bankrupt before the 1887 season.

== Regular season ==
=== Season standings ===
National League
Team	W	L	Pct.	GB	Home	Road
Chicago White Stockings	90	34	.726	—	52‍–‍10	38‍–‍24
Detroit Wolverines	87	36	.707	2½	49‍–‍13	38‍–‍23
New York Giants	75	44	.630	12½	47‍–‍12	28‍–‍32
Philadelphia Quakers	71	43	.623	14	45‍–‍14	26‍–‍29
Boston Beaneaters	56	61	.479	30½	32‍–‍26	24‍–‍35
St. Louis Maroons	43	79	.352	46	27‍–‍34	16‍–‍45
Kansas City Cowboys	30	91	.248	58½	17‍–‍40	13‍–‍51
Washington Nationals	28	92	.233	60	19‍–‍43	9‍–‍49

=== Record vs. opponents ===
1886 National League record Sources:
Team	BSN	CHI	DET	KC	NYG	PHI	SLM	WAS
Boston	—	6–12	6–11	11–6	6–11	3–10	11–6–1	13–5
Chicago	12–6	—	11–7	17–1	10–8–1	10–7–1	13–4	17–1
Detroit	11–6	7–11	—	16–2	11–7	10–7–1	15–2–1	17–1–1
Kansas City	6–11	1–17	2–16	—	3–15–1	2–14–1	5–12–2	11–6–1
New York	11–6	8–10–1	7–11	15–3–1	—	8–8–1	15–3	11–3–2
Philadelphia	10–3	7–10–1	7–10–1	14–2–1	8–8–1	—	12–6	13–4–1
St. Louis	6–11–1	4–13	2–15–1	12–5–2	3–15	6–12	—	10–8
Washington	5–13	1–17	1–17–1	6–11–1	3–11–2	4–13–1	8–10	—

=== Roster ===
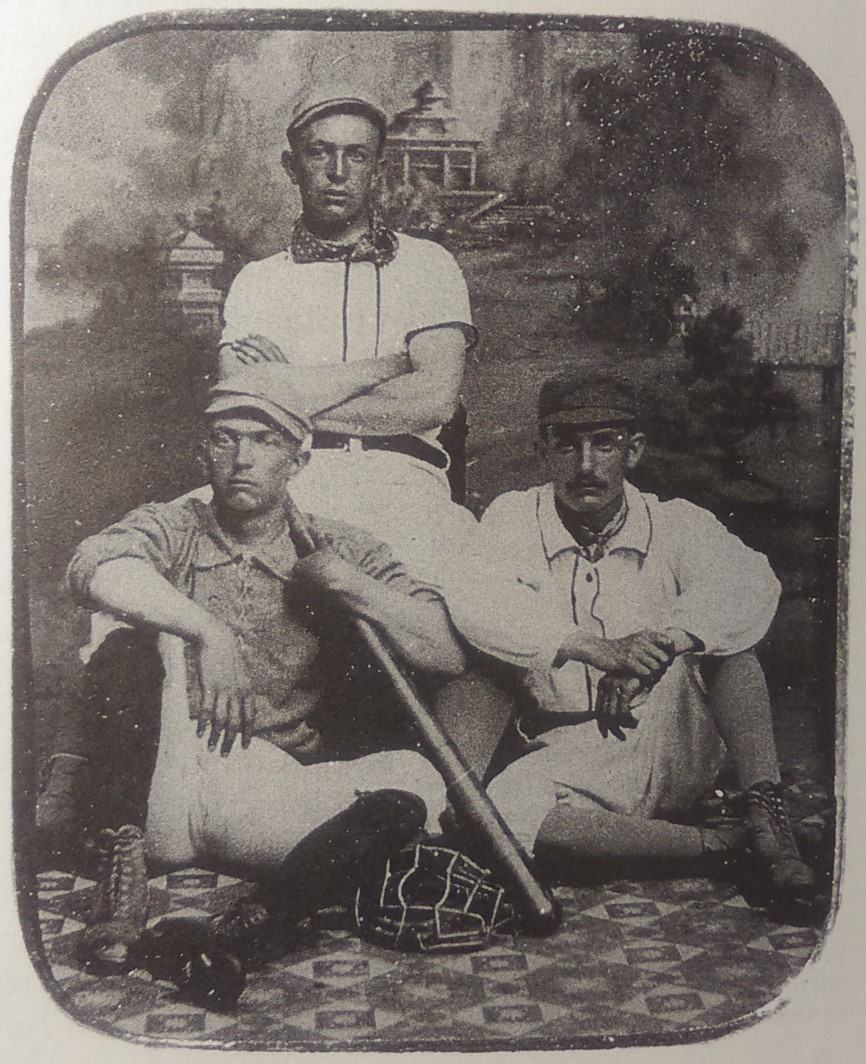
Silver King (left) and Jim Whitney (right) in 1886

1886 Kansas City Cowboys
Roster
Pitchers: Silver King; Larry McKeon; Stump Weidman; Jim Whitney	Catchers: George Baker; Fatty Briody; Dan Dugdale; Mert Hackett; Frank Ringo; Infielders: Charley Bassett; Jim Donnelly; Mox McQuery; Al Myers	Outfielders: Pete Conway; Jim Lillie; Paul Radford; Dave Rowe	Manager: Dave Rowe

== Player stats ==
=== Batting ===
==== Starters by position ====
Note: Pos = Position; G = Games played; AB = At bats; H = Hits; Avg. = Batting average; HR = Home runs; RBI = Runs batted in

Pos	Player	G	AB	H	Avg.	HR	RBI
C	Fatty Briody	56	215	51	.237	0	29
1B	Mox McQuery	122	449	111	.247	4	38
2B	Al Myers	118	473	131	.277	4	51
3B	Jim Donnelly	113	438	88	.201	0	38
SS	Charley Bassett	90	342	89	.260	2	32
OF	Paul Radford	122	493	113	.229	0	20
OF	Jim Lillie	114	416	73	.175	0	22
OF	Dave Rowe	105	429	103	.240	3	57

==== Other batters ====
Note: G = Games played; AB = At bats; H = Hits; Avg. = Batting average; HR = Home runs; RBI = Runs batted in

Player	G	AB	H	Avg.	HR	RBI
Mert Hackett	62	230	50	.217	3	25
Pete Conway	51	194	47	.242	1	18
Frank Ringo	16	56	13	.232	0	7
Dan Dugdale	12	40	7	.175	0	2
George Baker	1	4	1	.250	0	0

=== Pitching ===
==== Starting pitchers ====
Note: G = Games pitched; IP = Innings pitched; W = Wins; L = Losses; ERA = Earned run average; SO = Strikeouts

Player	G	IP	W	L	ERA	SO
Stump Weidman	51	427.2	12	36	4.52	168
Jim Whitney	46	393.0	12	32	4.49	167
Pete Conway	23	180.0	5	15	5.75	81
Silver King	5	39.0	1	3	4.85	23
Larry McKeon	3	21.0	0	2	10.71	3

==== Relief pitchers ====
Note: G = Games pitched; IP = Innings pitched; W = Wins; L = Losses; ERA = Earned run average; SO = Strikeouts

Player	G	W	L	SV	ERA	SO
Jim Lillie	1	0	0	0	4.50	0
