= 1886 Philadelphia Quakers season =

National League season

1886 Philadelphia Phillies
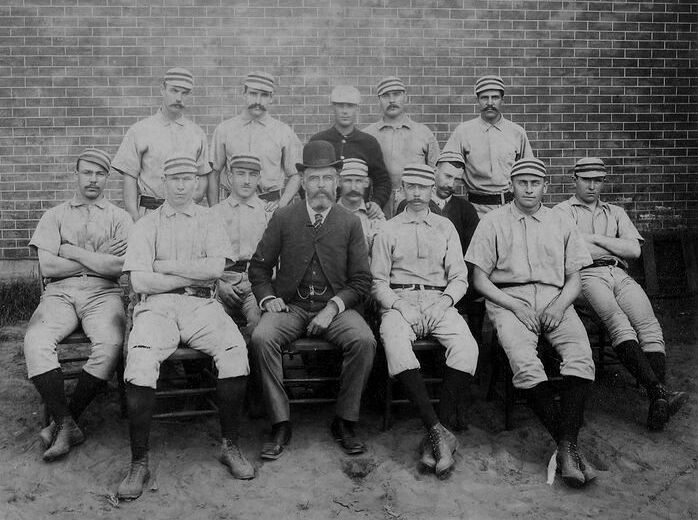
- Philadelphia Baseball Club, 1886, Deacon McGuire, George Wood, Joe Mulvey, Charlie Bastian, Andy Cusick, Sid Farrar, Ed Daily, Jim Fogarty, Harry Wright, Ed Andrews, Charlie Ferguson, Arthur Irwin, Dan Casey, Jack Clements.
- League: National League
- Ballpark: Recreation Park
- City: Philadelphia
- Record: 71–43 (.623)
- League place: 4th
- Owners: Al Reach, John Rogers
- Manager: Harry Wright

The 1886 Philadelphia Phillies season was a season in American baseball. The Phillies finished in fourth place in the National League with a record of 71–43, 14 games behind the Chicago White Stockings. Arthur Irwin served as team captain.

== Regular season ==
=== Season standings ===
National League
Team	W	L	Pct.	GB	Home	Road
Chicago White Stockings	90	34	.726	—	52‍–‍10	38‍–‍24
Detroit Wolverines	87	36	.707	2½	49‍–‍13	38‍–‍23
New York Giants	75	44	.630	12½	47‍–‍12	28‍–‍32
Philadelphia Quakers	71	43	.623	14	45‍–‍14	26‍–‍29
Boston Beaneaters	56	61	.479	30½	32‍–‍26	24‍–‍35
St. Louis Maroons	43	79	.352	46	27‍–‍34	16‍–‍45
Kansas City Cowboys	30	91	.248	58½	17‍–‍40	13‍–‍51
Washington Nationals	28	92	.233	60	19‍–‍43	9‍–‍49

=== Record vs. opponents ===
1886 National League record Sources:
Team	BSN	CHI	DET	KC	NYG	PHI	SLM	WAS
Boston	—	6–12	6–11	11–6	6–11	3–10	11–6–1	13–5
Chicago	12–6	—	11–7	17–1	10–8–1	10–7–1	13–4	17–1
Detroit	11–6	7–11	—	16–2	11–7	10–7–1	15–2–1	17–1–1
Kansas City	6–11	1–17	2–16	—	3–15–1	2–14–1	5–12–2	11–6–1
New York	11–6	8–10–1	7–11	15–3–1	—	8–8–1	15–3	11–3–2
Philadelphia	10–3	7–10–1	7–10–1	14–2–1	8–8–1	—	12–6	13–4–1
St. Louis	6–11–1	4–13	2–15–1	12–5–2	3–15	6–12	—	10–8
Washington	5–13	1–17	1–17–1	6–11–1	3–11–2	4–13–1	8–10	—

=== Roster ===
1886 Philadelphia Quakers
Roster
Pitchers: Dan Casey; Charlie Ferguson; John Strike; Ledell Titcomb	Catchers: Jack Clements; Andy Cusick; Charlie Ganzel; Deacon McGuire; Infielders: Charlie Bastian; Sid Farrar; Jack Farrell; Arthur Irwin; Joe Mulvey	Outfielders: Ed Andrews; Ed Daily; Jim Fogarty; Tommy McCarthy; George Wood	Manager: Harry Wright

== Player stats ==
=== Batting ===
==== Starters by position ====
Note: Pos = Position; G = Games played; AB = At bats; H = Hits; Avg. = Batting average; HR = Home runs; RBI = Runs batted in

Pos	Player	G	AB	H	Avg.	HR	RBI
C	Deacon McGuire	50	167	33	.198	2	18
1B	Sid Farrar	118	439	109	.248	5	50
2B	Charlie Bastian	105	373	81	.217	2	38
SS	Arthur Irwin	101	373	87	.233	0	34
3B	Joe Mulvey	107	430	115	.267	2	53
OF	Jim Fogarty	77	280	82	.293	3	47
OF	Ed Andrews	107	437	109	.249	2	28
OF	George Wood	106	450	123	.273	4	50

==== Other batters ====
Note: G = Games played; AB = At bats; H = Hits; Avg. = Batting average; HR = Home runs; RBI = Runs batted in

Player	G	AB	H	Avg.	HR	RBI
Ed Daily	79	309	70	.227	4	50
Jack Clements	54	185	38	.205	0	11
Andy Cusick	29	104	23	.221	0	4
Jack Farrell	17	60	11	.183	0	3
Tommy McCarthy	8	27	5	.185	0	3
Charlie Ganzel	1	3	0	.000	0	0

=== Pitching ===
==== Starting pitchers ====
Note: G = Games pitched; IP = Innings pitched; W = Wins; L = Losses; ERA = Earned run average; SO = Strikeouts

Player	G	IP	W	L	ERA	SO
Charlie Ferguson	48	395.2	30	9	1.98	212
Dan Casey	44	369.0	24	18	2.41	193
Ed Daily	27	218.0	16	9	3.06	95
Ledell Titcomb	5	41.0	0	5	3.73	24
John Strike	2	15.0	1	1	4.80	11

==== Relief pitchers ====
Note: G = Games pitched; W = Wins; L = Losses; SV = Saves; ERA = Earned run average; SO = Strikeouts

Player	G	W	L	SV	ERA	SO
Jim Fogarty	1	0	1	0	0.00	4
Tommy McCarthy	1	0	0	0	0.00	1
