= 1886 Boston Beaneaters season =

1886 Boston Beaneaters
- League: National League
- Ballpark: South End Grounds
- City: Boston, Massachusetts
- Record: 56–61 (.479)
- League place: 5th
- Owner: Arthur Soden
- Manager: John Morrill

The 1886 Boston Beaneaters season was the 16th season of the franchise.

== Regular season ==
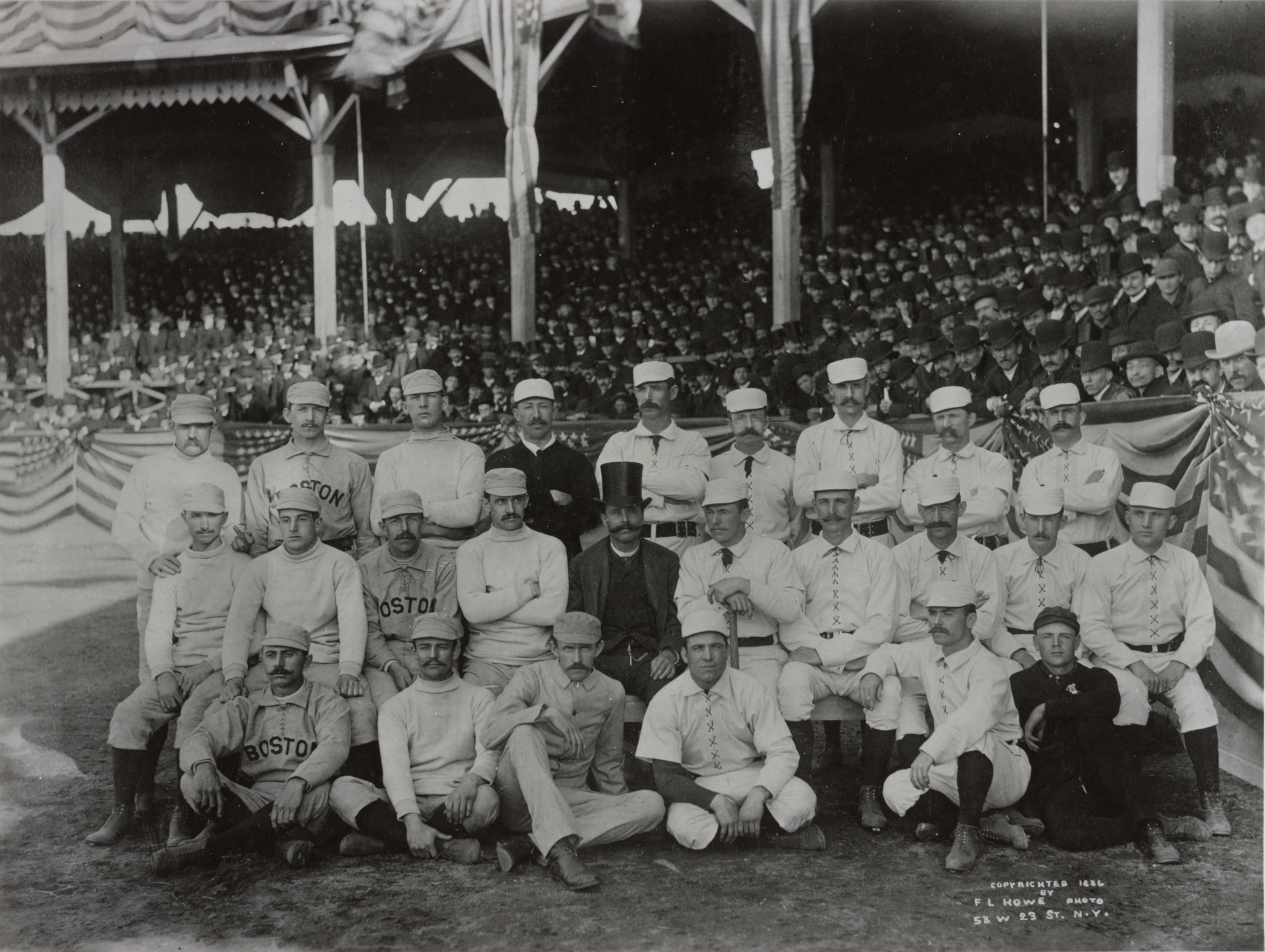
Opening Day photo, Boston Beaneaters and New York Giants

=== Season standings ===
National League
| Team | W | L | Pct. | GB | Home | Road |
|---|---|---|---|---|---|---|
| Chicago White Stockings | 90 | 34 | .726 | — | 52‍–‍10 | 38‍–‍24 |
| Detroit Wolverines | 87 | 36 | .707 | 2½ | 49‍–‍13 | 38‍–‍23 |
| New York Giants | 75 | 44 | .630 | 12½ | 47‍–‍12 | 28‍–‍32 |
| Philadelphia Quakers | 71 | 43 | .623 | 14 | 45‍–‍14 | 26‍–‍29 |
| Boston Beaneaters | 56 | 61 | .479 | 30½ | 32‍–‍26 | 24‍–‍35 |
| St. Louis Maroons | 43 | 79 | .352 | 46 | 27‍–‍34 | 16‍–‍45 |
| Kansas City Cowboys | 30 | 91 | .248 | 58½ | 17‍–‍40 | 13‍–‍51 |
| Washington Nationals | 28 | 92 | .233 | 60 | 19‍–‍43 | 9‍–‍49 |

=== Record vs. opponents ===
1886 National League record Sources:
| Team | BSN | CHI | DET | KC | NYG | PHI | SLM | WAS |
|---|---|---|---|---|---|---|---|---|
| Boston | — | 6–12 | 6–11 | 11–6 | 6–11 | 3–10 | 11–6–1 | 13–5 |
| Chicago | 12–6 | — | 11–7 | 17–1 | 10–8–1 | 10–7–1 | 13–4 | 17–1 |
| Detroit | 11–6 | 7–11 | — | 16–2 | 11–7 | 10–7–1 | 15–2–1 | 17–1–1 |
| Kansas City | 6–11 | 1–17 | 2–16 | — | 3–15–1 | 2–14–1 | 5–12–2 | 11–6–1 |
| New York | 11–6 | 8–10–1 | 7–11 | 15–3–1 | — | 8–8–1 | 15–3 | 11–3–2 |
| Philadelphia | 10–3 | 7–10–1 | 7–10–1 | 14–2–1 | 8–8–1 | — | 12–6 | 13–4–1 |
| St. Louis | 6–11–1 | 4–13 | 2–15–1 | 12–5–2 | 3–15 | 6–12 | — | 10–8 |
| Washington | 5–13 | 1–17 | 1–17–1 | 6–11–1 | 3–11–2 | 4–13–1 | 8–10 | — |

=== Roster ===
1886 Boston Beaneaters
Roster
| Pitchers: Charlie Parsons; Old Hoss Radbourn; Bill Stemmyer; Catchers: Con Daily; Pat Dealy; Tom Gunning; Pop Tate | Infielders: Myron Allen; Charlie Buffinton; Jack Burdock; John Morrill; Billy Nash; Sam Wise | Outfielders: Joe Hornung; Dick Johnston; Tom Poorman; Ezra Sutton | Manager: John Morrill |

== Player stats ==
=== Batting ===
==== Starters by position ====
Note: Pos = Position; G = Games played; AB = At bats; H = Hits; Avg. = Batting average; HR = Home runs; RBI = Runs batted in

| Pos | Player | G | AB | H | Avg. | HR | RBI |
|---|---|---|---|---|---|---|---|
| C | Con Daily | 50 | 180 | 43 | .239 | 0 | 21 |
| 1B | Sam Wise | 96 | 387 | 112 | .289 | 4 | 72 |
| 2B | Jack Burdock | 59 | 221 | 48 | .217 | 0 | 25 |
| SS | John Morrill | 117 | 430 | 106 | .247 | 7 | 69 |
| 3B | Billy Nash | 109 | 417 | 117 | .281 | 1 | 45 |
| OF | Joe Hornung | 94 | 424 | 109 | .257 | 2 | 40 |
| OF | Tom Poorman | 88 | 371 | 97 | .261 | 3 | 41 |
| OF | Dick Johnston | 109 | 413 | 99 | .240 | 1 | 57 |

==== Other batters ====
Note: G = Games played; AB = At bats; H = Hits; Avg. = Batting average; HR = Home runs; RBI = Runs batted in

| Player | G | AB | H | Avg. | HR | RBI |
|---|---|---|---|---|---|---|
| Ezra Sutton | 116 | 499 | 138 | .277 | 3 | 48 |
| Charlie Buffinton | 44 | 176 | 51 | .290 | 1 | 30 |
| Pop Tate | 31 | 106 | 24 | .226 | 0 | 3 |
| Tom Gunning | 27 | 98 | 22 | .224 | 0 | 7 |
| Pat Dealy | 15 | 46 | 15 | .326 | 0 | 3 |
| Myron Allen | 1 | 3 | 0 | .000 | 0 | 0 |

=== Pitching ===
==== Starting pitchers ====
Note: G = Games pitched; IP = Innings pitched; W = Wins; L = Losses; ERA = Earned run average; SO = Strikeouts

| Player | G | IP | W | L | ERA | SO |
|---|---|---|---|---|---|---|
| Old Hoss Radbourn | 58 | 509.1 | 27 | 31 | 3.00 | 218 |
| Bill Stemmeyer | 41 | 348.2 | 22 | 18 | 3.02 | 239 |
| Charlie Buffinton | 18 | 151.0 | 7 | 10 | 4.59 | 47 |
| Charlie Parsons | 2 | 16.0 | 0 | 2 | 3.94 | 5 |

==== Relief pitchers ====
Note: G = Games pitched; W = Wins; L = Losses; SV = Saves; ERA = Earned run average; SO = Strikeouts

| Player | G | W | L | SV | ERA | SO |
|---|---|---|---|---|---|---|
| John Morrill | 1 | 0 | 0 | 0 | 0.00 | 2 |
