= Pete Galligan =

American baseball player (1860–1917)

- Shortstop
- Born: January 20, 1860; Chicago, Illinois, U.S.
- Died: May 20, 1917 (aged 57); Chicago, Illinois, U.S.
- Batted: Unknown Threw: Unknown

MLB debut
- September 4, 1886, for the Washington Nationals

Last MLB appearance
- September 4, 1886, for the Washington Nationals

MLB statistics
- Batting average: .200
- Home runs: 0
- Runs batted in: 0
- Stats at Baseball Reference

Teams
- Washington Nationals (1886)

Peter F. Galligan (January 20, 1860 – May 20, 1917) was an American politician who also played shortstop in Major League Baseball in one game for the 1886 Washington Nationals.

== Biography ==
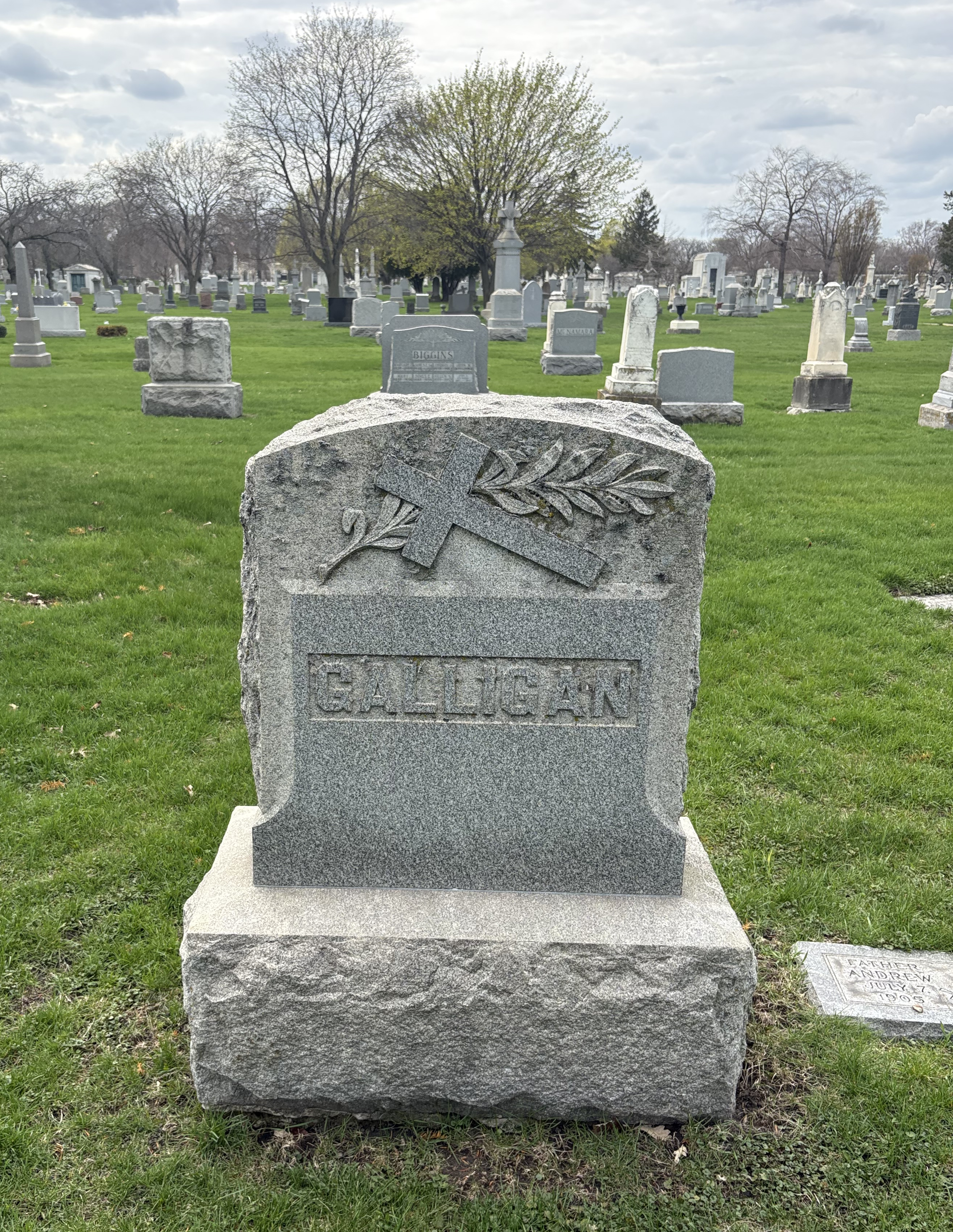
Galligan's grave at Calvary Cemetery

Galligan was born in Chicago, Illinois and went to Saint Ignatius College. After his brief appearance in the majors, he played in the Western Association in 1888, the Central Interstate League in 1889 and the Chicago City League in 1891. He also worked in the manufacturing business.

Galligan served briefly as a patrolman for the police force before he was elected to the Illinois House of Representatives, where he served from 1897 to 1899 and from 1909 to 1913 as a Democrat. He also served in the Illinois Senate from 1899 to 1903.

Galligan died in Chicago on May 20, 1917, and was buried at Calvary Cemetery in Evanston.
