= 1886 Chicago White Stockings season =

Major League Baseball season

1886 Chicago White Stockings
- National League champions
- League: National League
- Ballpark: West Side Park
- City: Chicago
- Record: 90–34 (.726)
- League place: 1st
- Owner: Albert Spalding
- Manager: Cap Anson

The 1886 Chicago White Stockings season was the 15th season of the Chicago White Stockings franchise, the 11th in the National League and the second at the first West Side Park. The White Stockings finished first in the National League with a record of 90–34, 2.5 games ahead of the second place Detroit Wolverines. The team was defeated four games to two by the St. Louis Browns in the 1886 World Series.

== Regular season ==
=== Season standings ===
National League
Team	W	L	Pct.	GB	Home	Road
Chicago White Stockings	90	34	.726	—	52‍–‍10	38‍–‍24
Detroit Wolverines	87	36	.707	2½	49‍–‍13	38‍–‍23
New York Giants	75	44	.630	12½	47‍–‍12	28‍–‍32
Philadelphia Quakers	71	43	.623	14	45‍–‍14	26‍–‍29
Boston Beaneaters	56	61	.479	30½	32‍–‍26	24‍–‍35
St. Louis Maroons	43	79	.352	46	27‍–‍34	16‍–‍45
Kansas City Cowboys	30	91	.248	58½	17‍–‍40	13‍–‍51
Washington Nationals	28	92	.233	60	19‍–‍43	9‍–‍49

=== Record vs. opponents ===
1886 National League record Sources:
Team	BSN	CHI	DET	KC	NYG	PHI	SLM	WAS
Boston	—	6–12	6–11	11–6	6–11	3–10	11–6–1	13–5
Chicago	12–6	—	11–7	17–1	10–8–1	10–7–1	13–4	17–1
Detroit	11–6	7–11	—	16–2	11–7	10–7–1	15–2–1	17–1–1
Kansas City	6–11	1–17	2–16	—	3–15–1	2–14–1	5–12–2	11–6–1
New York	11–6	8–10–1	7–11	15–3–1	—	8–8–1	15–3	11–3–2
Philadelphia	10–3	7–10–1	7–10–1	14–2–1	8–8–1	—	12–6	13–4–1
St. Louis	6–11–1	4–13	2–15–1	12–5–2	3–15	6–12	—	10–8
Washington	5–13	1–17	1–17–1	6–11–1	3–11–2	4–13–1	8–10	—

== Roster ==
1886 Chicago White Stockings
Roster
Pitchers: John Clarkson; Jocko Flynn; Jim McCormick	Catchers: Silver Flint; Lou Hardie; George Moolic; Infielders: Cap Anson; Tom Burns; Fred Pfeffer; Ned Williamson	Outfielders: Abner Dalrymple; George Gore; King Kelly; Jimmy Ryan; Billy Sunday	Manager: Cap Anson

== Player stats ==
=== Batting ===
==== Starters by position ====
Note: Pos = Position; G = Games played; AB = At bats; H = Hits; Avg. = Batting average; HR = Home runs; RBI = Runs batted in

Pos	Player	G	AB	H	Avg.	HR	RBI
C	Silver Flint	54	173	35	.202	1	13
1B	Cap Anson	125	504	187	.371	10	147
2B	Fred Pfeffer	118	474	125	.264	7	95
SS	Ned Williamson	121	430	93	.216	6	58
3B	Tom Burns	112	445	123	.276	3	65
OF	Jimmy Ryan	84	327	100	.306	4	53
OF	Abner Dalrymple	82	331	77	.233	3	26
OF	George Gore	118	444	135	.304	6	63

==== Other batters ====
Note: G = Games played; AB = At bats; H = Hits; Avg. = Batting average; HR = Home runs; RBI = Runs batted in

Player	G	AB	H	Avg.	HR	RBI
King Kelly	118	451	175	.388	4	79
Billy Sunday	28	103	25	.243	0	6
George Moolic	16	56	8	.143	0	2
Lou Hardie	16	51	9	.176	0	3

=== Pitching ===
==== Starting pitchers ====
Note: G = Games pitched; IP = Innings pitched; W = Wins; L = Losses; ERA = Earned run average; SO = Strikeouts

Player	G	IP	W	L	ERA	SO
John Clarkson	55	466.2	36	17	2.41	313
Jim McCormick	42	347.2	31	11	2.82	172
Jocko Flynn	32	257.0	23	6	2.24	146

==== Relief pitchers ====
Note: G = Games pitched; W = Wins; L = Losses; SV = Saves; ERA = Earned run average; SO = Strikeouts

Player	G	W	L	SV	ERA	SO
Jimmy Ryan	5	0	0	1	4.63	15
Ned Williamson	2	0	0	1	0.00	1

== 1886 World Series ==
The White Stockings lost the 1886 World Series to the St. Louis Browns, four games to two.
