= Charlie Yingling =

American baseball player (1865–1897)

- Shortstop
- Born: December 7, 1865; Baltimore, Maryland
- Died: April 13, 1897 (aged 31); Baltimore, Maryland
- Batted: Unknown Threw: Unknown

MLB debut
- June 22, 1894, for the Philadelphia Phillies

Last MLB appearance
- June 22, 1894, for the Philadelphia Phillies

MLB statistics
- Games played: 1
- At bats: 4
- Hits: 1
- Stats at Baseball Reference

Teams
- Philadelphia Phillies (1894)

Charles Christian Yingling (December 7, 1865 – April 13, 1897) was a professional baseball player. Yingling played in one game in Major League Baseball with the Philadelphia Phillies in 1894 as a shortstop. He had one hit in four at bats. Yingling was born and died in Baltimore, Maryland.

Coincidentally, Charlie's brother, Joe Yingling, also appeared in just one major league game, in his case as a pitcher. In 1887, the two were teammates on the minor league baseball team in Haverhill, Massachusetts.
