= John Henry (outfielder/pitcher) =

American baseball player (1863–1939)

- Outfielder / Pitcher
- Born: September 2, 1863; Springfield, Massachusetts, U.S.
- Died: June 11, 1939 (aged 75); Hartford, Connecticut, U.S.
- Batted: Unknown Threw: Left

MLB debut
- August 13, 1884, for the Cleveland Blues

Last MLB appearance
- August 7, 1890, for the New York Giants

MLB statistics
- Batting average: .243
- Runs batted in: 19
- Win–loss record: 4–14
- Earned run average: 4.09
- Stats at Baseball Reference

Teams
- Cleveland Blues (1884); Baltimore Orioles (1885); Washington Nationals (1886); New York Giants (1890)

John Michael Henry (September 2, 1863 – June 11, 1939) was an American outfielder and starting pitcher in Major League Baseball who played between 1884 and 1890 for the Cleveland Blues (1884), Baltimore Orioles (1885), Washington Nationals (1886) and New York Giants (1890). Henry was born in Springfield, Massachusetts. He threw left-handed. Batting side is unknown.

In a four-season career, Henry was a .243 hitter (53-for-218) with 28 runs and RBI in 60 games, including nine doubles and 11 stolen bases. He did not hit home runs. As a pitcher, he posted a 4–14 record with a 4.09 ERA in 18 starts, including one shutout and 18 complete games, giving up 64 earned runs on 152 hits and 54 walks while striking out 73 in 140 2/3 innings of work.

== Death ==
Henry died in Hartford, Connecticut, at the age of 75 and is buried at Mount St. Benedict Cemetery in Bloomfield, Connecticut.
