= Billy Smith (1880s pitcher) =

American baseball player (1861–1928)

Bill Smith
- Pitcher
- Born: April 1861; New Orleans, Louisiana, US
- Died: May 24, 1928 (aged 67); New Orleans, Louisiana, US
- Batted: Unknown Threw: Right

MLB debut
- July 6, 1886, for the Detroit Wolverines

Last MLB appearance
- September 13, 1886, for the Detroit Wolverines

MLB statistics
- Win–loss record: 5-4
- ERA: 4.09
- Strikeouts: 36
- Stats at Baseball Reference

Teams
- Detroit Wolverines (1886)

Frederick William Smith (born Schmidt) (April, 1861 – May 24, 1928) was an American professional baseball pitcher from 1886 to 1889. He played Major League Baseball for the Detroit Wolverines in 1886, compiling a 5-4 win–loss record and a 4.09 earned run average (ERA). A native of New Orleans, Louisiana, he also pitched for minor league baseball clubs in the southern United States and was reported to have pitched more than one no-hitter and to have once struck out 22 batters in a game and 70 batters in four games.

== Early years ==
Smith was born in 1861 in New Orleans, Louisiana. His parents, George Schmidt and Catherine (Kohlman) Schmidt were both immigrants to the United States from Germany.

== Professional baseball ==
Smith began his professional baseball career in 1886 as a minor league pitcher for the Southern Association club in Macon, Georgia. He compiled an 11-7 and 1.05 ERA for Macon in 1886.

Smith next played for the Detroit Wolverines of the National League from July 6 to September 13, 1886. He started nine games as a pitcher for Detroit and also appeared in one game as an outfielder. He threw nine complete games and compiled a 5-4 record with a 4.09 ERA and 36 strikeouts in 77 innings pitched.

A newspaper article in The Times-Picayune reported that Smith married a young lady from New Orleans' Sixth Ward shortly before leaving for Macon, Georgia, to join the Detroit team in early March 1887. However, in April 1887, the Detroit club sold Smith for $500 to the Memphis Grays of the Southern League. Smith played for Memphis from 1887 to 1889. He compiled a 2-6 record and a 3.49 ERA for Memphis during the 1888 season. He also played for the Mobile, Alabama, club during the 1889 season.

According to Smith's obituary from The Times-Picayune, Smith was the first baseball player from New Orleans to gain nationwide fame. The obituary states that, in addition to the clubs mentioned above, he also played professional baseball for clubs in Columbus, Georgia, Savannah, Georgia, and "several local teams." According to the obituary, Smith pitched more than one no-hitter and once struck out 22 batters in a game and 70 batters in four games.

== Family and later years ==
Smith was married in March 1887 to Katherine Rapp. After retiring from baseball, Smith returned to New Orleans. In 1900, Smith was employed as a cooper and was living in New Orleans with his wife, Katherine, and their four children: William (born August 1890), Louise (born April 1892), Katherine (born May 1894) and Helen (born August 1898). In 1900, he worked in the warehouse of a cooperage. He also worked in his later years as a clerk in a cotton warehouse. He died in New Orleans in May 1928 at age 67. He was buried at the Valence Street Cemetery in New Orleans.
