= Pat Dealy =

American baseball player (1861–1924)

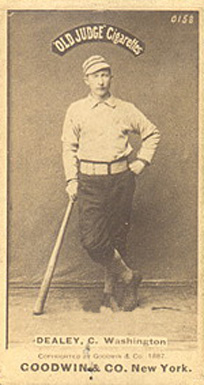
- Catcher
- Born: November 12, 1861; Underhill, Vermont, U.S.
- Died: December 16, 1924 (aged 63); Buffalo, New York, U.S.
- Batted: Right Threw: Right

MLB debut
- September 30, 1884, for the St. Paul Saints

Last MLB appearance
- June 5, 1890, for the Syracuse Stars

MLB statistics
- Batting average: .241
- Home runs: 2
- Runs batted in: 34
- Stats at Baseball Reference

Teams
- St. Paul Saints (1884); Boston Beaneaters (1885–86); Washington Nationals (1887); Syracuse Stars (1890)

Patrick E. Dealy (November 12, 1861 – December 16, 1924) was an American Major League Baseball player. He played all or part of five seasons in the majors between 1884 and 1890. He debuted with the St. Paul Saints of the Union Association in 1884 as their backup catcher, which was his primary position throughout his career (he also played substantial numbers of games at shortstop, third base, and the outfield). He then played three seasons in the National League, with the Boston Beaneaters in 1885 and 1886 and Washington Nationals in 1887. His final season came with the Syracuse Stars of the American Association.
