= John McGlone =

American baseball player (1864–1927)

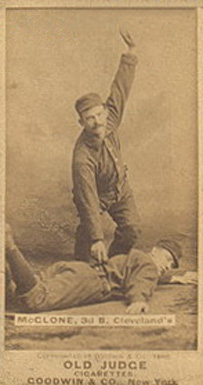
- Third baseman
- Born: 1864; Brooklyn, New York, U.S.
- Died: November 25, 1927 (aged 62–63); Brooklyn, New York, U.S.
- Batted: Unknown Threw: Right

MLB debut
- October 7, 1886, for the Washington Nationals

Last MLB appearance
- August 15, 1888, for the Cleveland Blues

MLB statistics
- Batting average: .195
- Runs scored: 38
- Runs batted in: 33
- Stats at Baseball Reference

Teams
- Washington Nationals (1886); Cleveland Blues (1887–1888)

John T. McGlone (1864 – November 25, 1927) was an American professional baseball player from 1886 to 1888. He played in the minors through 1894.
