= Frank Graves (baseball) =

American baseball player and manager (1860–1916)

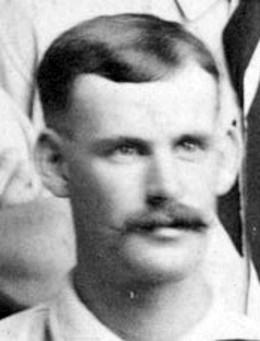
- Catcher
- Born: November 2, 1860; Cincinnati, Ohio, U.S.
- Died: March 23, 1916 (aged 55); San Jose, California, U.S.
- Batted: Right Threw: Unknown

MLB debut
- May 10, 1886, for the St. Louis Maroons

Last MLB appearance
- October 4, 1886, for the St. Louis Maroons

MLB statistics
- Batting average: .152
- Hits: 21
- At bats: 138
- Stats at Baseball Reference

Teams
- St. Louis Maroons (1886)

Frank Norris Graves (November 2, 1860 - March 23, 1916) was an American baseball catcher and manager.

Graves played for the St. Louis Maroons in 1886, leading the league in the dubious category of passed balls with 81, despite only playing in 43 games.

He managed the minor league Detroit Tigers in 1897 and 1898.
