= George Shoch =

American baseball player (1859–1937)

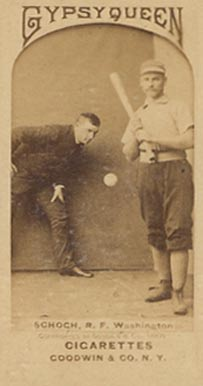
- Outfielder / Shortstop / Second baseman
- Born: January 6, 1859; Philadelphia, Pennsylvania, U.S.
- Died: September 30, 1937 (aged 78); Philadelphia, Pennsylvania, U.S.
- Batted: Right Threw: Right

MLB debut
- September 10, 1886, for the Washington Nationals

Last MLB appearance
- October 2, 1897, for the Brooklyn Bridegrooms

MLB statistics
- Batting average: .265
- Home runs: 10
- Runs batted in: 323
- Stats at Baseball Reference

Teams
- Washington Nationals (1886–1889); Milwaukee Brewers (1891); Baltimore Orioles (1892); Brooklyn Grooms/Bridegrooms (1893–1897)

George Quintus Shoch (January 6, 1859 – September 30, 1937) was an American professional baseball player. A utility member of the Washington Nationals from 1886 through 1889, he also played for the Milwaukee Brewers (1891), Baltimore Orioles (1892) and Brooklyn Grooms/Brooklyn Bridegrooms (1893–97).

== Biography ==
Born in Philadelphia, Pennsylvania on January 6, 1859, Shoch who became known for his adaptability as a utility for multiple baseball teams across American during the latter part of the nineteenth century. In eleven seasons he played in 706 Games and had 2,536 at bats, 414 runs, 671 hits, eighty-nine doubles, twenty-eight triples, ten home runs, 323 RBI, 138 stolen bases, 298 walks, .265 batting average, .355 On-base percentage, .334 Slugging percentage, and 846 total bases. During the 1892 season, he was sidelined after breaking his arm.

== Death and interment ==
Shoch died at the age of seventy-eight in Philadelphia on September 30, 1937, and was interred at that city's Cedar Hill Cemetery.
