= Bill Wise (baseball) =

American baseball player (1861–1940)

- Pitcher/Outfielder
- Born: March 15, 1861; Washington, D.C., U.S.
- Died: May 5, 1940 (aged 79); Washington, D.C., U.S.
- Batted: Unknown Threw: Unknown

MLB debut
- May 2, 1882, for the Baltimore Orioles

Last MLB appearance
- July 17, 1886, for the Washington Nationals

MLB statistics
- Win–loss record: 24–21
- Earned run average: 3.07
- Strikeouts: 277
- Batting average: .224
- Home runs: 2
- Runs scored: 53
- Stats at Baseball Reference

Teams
- Baltimore Orioles (1882); Washington Nationals (UA) (1884); Washington Nationals (NL) (1886)

William E. Wise (March 15, 1861 – May 5, 1940) was an American professional baseball player. He played in Major League Baseball for three seasons from 1882 to 1886, splitting his time between pitcher and the outfield. He played for the Baltimore Orioles of the American Association, the Washington Nationals of the Union Association, and the Washington Nationals of the National League. Wise died in his hometown of Washington, D.C. at the age of 79, and is interred at Glenwood Cemetery.
