= Dave Oldfield =

American baseball player (1864–1939)

- Catcher / Outfielder
- Born: December 18, 1864; United States
- Died: August 28, 1939 (aged 74); Philadelphia, Pennsylvania, United States
- Batted: Both Threw: Left

MLB debut
- June 28, 1883,, for the Baltimore Orioles

Last MLB appearance
- October 11, 1886,, for the Washington Nationals

MLB statistics
- Batting average: .200
- Hits: 31
- Runs scored: 11
- Stats at Baseball Reference

Teams
- Baltimore Orioles (1883); Brooklyn Grays (1885–1886); Washington Nationals (1886)

David Oldfield (December 18, 1864 – August 28, 1939) was an American catcher and outfielder in Major League Baseball in 1883 and then from 1885 to 1886. He played with three teams during his three season career; first with the Baltimore Orioles in 1883, then with the Brooklyn Grays from 1885 to 1886, and finally with the Washington Nationals in 1886.

== Career ==
Oldfield was born on December 18, 1864 in Philadelphia. He began his professional baseball playing career with the Altoona, Pennsylvania representative of the Western Interstate League in 1883 at the age of 18. However, he played for the Brooklyn team in the Interstate Association shortly thereafter, during which, he played a single game for the Baltimore Orioles of the American Association on June 28, 1883. He had no hits in four at bats while committing three errors and tallied five passed balls as the team's catcher. For the 1884 baseball season, he played for the Lancaster Ironsides of the Eastern League.

He began the 1885 season with Lancaster, which later moved and became the Baltimore Monumentals. Oldfield then finished the year with the Brooklyn Grays of the American Association, and had a .320 batting average in 10 games played. He stayed with Brooklyn through the beginning of the 1886 season, then later played for the Washington Nationals of the National League. For the season, he had a .183 batting average in 35 games played while playing a catcher and in the outfield.

Although Oldfield did not return to major league play again, he did play professionally in the International Association for several seasons, including the Oswego Starchboxes (1887), the Toronto Canucks (1887–1888), the Hamilton Hams (1889), the Montreal Shamrocks (1890), and the Buffalo Bisons (1890). He died at the age of 74 in his hometown of Philadelphia, and is interred at Oakland Cemetery.
