= Sadie Houck =

American baseball player (1856–1919)

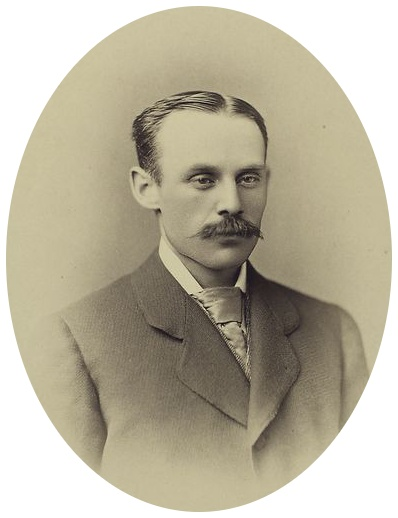
- Shortstop
- Born: February 29, 1836; Washington, D.C.
- Died: May 26, 1919 (aged 63); Washington, D.C.
- Batted: Right Threw: Right

MLB debut
- May 1, 1879, for the Boston Red Caps

Last MLB appearance
- September 23, 1887, for the New York Metropolitans

MLB statistics
- Batting average: .250
- Runs: 406
- Runs batted in: 234

Teams
- Boston Red Caps (1879–1880); Providence Grays (1880); Detroit Wolverines (1881, 1883); Philadelphia Athletics (1884–1885); Baltimore Orioles (1886); Washington Nationals (1886); New York Metropolitans (1887)

Career highlights and awards
- Led the National League in games played in 1883; Led the American Association in fielding percentage in 1884

Sargent Perry "Sadie" Houck (February 29, 1856 – May 26, 1919) was a professional baseball player from 1879 to 1888. He played eight seasons of Major League Baseball, principally as a shortstop, for the Boston Red Caps, Providence Grays, Detroit Wolverines, Philadelphia Athletics, Baltimore Orioles, Washington Nationals, and New York Metropolitans.

Houck was considered a solid defensive shortstop. During his prime years of 1881, 1883 and 1884, he led either the National League or the American Association in assists (1883, 1884), putouts (1883), double plays (1881, 1883), and fielding percentage (1884) by a shortstop.

Houck had a career batting average of .250 and ranked fourth in the National League with 35 extra base hits as a rookie in 1879. He was added to the National League's "blacklist" in September 1881, allegedly for being "addicted to drink", and barred from playing for or against any National League team. He was reinstated in 1883.

== Family ==
Houck was born in Washington, D.C., in 1856. He was the son of John W. and Catherine Houck.

== Baseball career ==
=== Boston and Providence ===
Houck made his major league debut in May 1879 with the Boston Red Caps, splitting his playing time between the outfield and shortstop. In his rookie season, Houck was among the National League leaders with 35 extra base hits (4th), 24 doubles (5th), 69 runs scored (8th), and nine triples (9th).

Houck began the 1880 season with Boston, but played most of the season with the Providence Grays. His batting average dropped by 74 points to .201 from 1879 to 1880.

=== Detroit ===
In 1881, Houck signed with the Detroit Wolverines in their first season in the National League. Houck was not with the Wolverines at the start of the season, but was credited with filling a hole in the team's defense when he signed with them. The Detroit Free Press on June 19, 1881, wrote that the team had fully recovered from a severe illness with "Dr. Houck curing them." Houck raised his batting average to .279 with 16 doubles, 6 triples, a home run, and 36 RBIs in 75 games. Defensively, he led the National League's shortstops with 40 double plays.

In late September 1881, Houck was placed on a list of players expelled from the league as part of the league's so-called "blacklist." The Detroit Free Press reported on Houck's expulsion as follows: "Houck is one of the best short stops in the country and a thorough ball player. Were his habits good, he could command $250 or $300 per month during the season, but he is addicted to drink, and is not, therefore, entirely trustworthy. He was warned of his fate two months ago."

As a result of his inclusion on the "blacklist", Houck did not play in organized baseball during the 1882 season. After missing the 1882 season, Houck was removed from the "blacklist" and returned to the Detroit Wolverines. Houck played all 101 games at shortstop for Detroit in 1883. He led the National League that year in assists (328), putouts (162), and double plays (36) by a shortstop. His 12 triples also ranked seventh in the league.

=== Philadelphia ===
In November 1883, Detroit sold Houck to the Philadelphia Athletics of the American Association. He appeared in 108 games for Philadelphia in 1884 and compiled career highs with a .297 batting average and 14 triples. He led the American Association in fielding percentage (.893) and assists (379) by a shortstop. He also ranked among the league leaders with 122 putouts at shortstop (3rd), 140 hits (8th) and 187 total bases (8th).

=== Later years ===
In February 1886, the Athletics sold Houck to the Baltimore Orioles, also in the American Association. He compiled a .192 batting average for Baltimore in 1886. He next played for Washington Nationals in 1887 and compiled a .215 batting average.

Houck spent most of the 1888 season in the minor leagues with the Charleston/New Orleans Pelicans where he compiled a .228 batting average in 52 games. Late in the 1888 season, Houck had a final major league stint with the New York Metropolitans. He compiled a .152 batting average and appeared in his last minor league game on September 23, 1887, at age 31.

== Death ==
Houck died in Washington, D.C., in 1919 at age 63. After a funeral at Frank Geier's Sons chapel. The sermon was held by long time friend Aidan Howlin. his interment was at Glenwood Cemetery.
