= Gene Bagley =

American baseball player (1861–1901)

- Catcher / Outfielder
- Born: June 7, 1861; New York City, U.S.
- Died: August 15, 1901 (aged 40); Long Island City, New York, U.S.
- Batted: Unknown Threw: Unknown

MLB debut
- September 11, 1886, for the New York Giants

Last MLB appearance
- October 1, 1886, for the New York Giants

MLB statistics
- Batting average: .125
- Home runs: 0
- Runs scored: 1
- Stats at Baseball Reference

Teams
- New York Giants (1886)

Eugene T. Bagley (June 7, 1861 – August 15, 1901) was a 19th-century American professional baseball player. He played catcher and outfielder for the 1886 New York Giants.
