= Red Connally =

American baseball player

- Outfielder
- Batted: Switch Threw: Unknown

MLB debut
- July 1, 1886, for the St. Louis Maroons

Last MLB appearance
- July 6, 1886, for the St. Louis Maroons

MLB statistics
- Batting average: .000
- Hits: 0
- At bats: 7
- Stats at Baseball Reference

Teams
- St. Louis Maroons (1886)

John M. "Red" Connally was a Major League Baseball outfielder. Connally played for the St. Louis Maroons in 1886. In two career games, he had 0 hits in 7 at-bats.

Red was likely an amateur player from St. Louis, but little else is known. His date of death has been wrongly associated with similarly-named John Connelly, who served as umpire when Red made his brief appearances.
