= Louis Pelouze =

American baseball player (1863–1939)

- Outfielder
- Born: September 10, 1863; Fort Monroe, Virginia, U.S.
- Died: January 9, 1939 (aged 75); New York, New York, U.S.
- Batted: Right Threw: Right

MLB debut
- July 24, 1886, for the St. Louis Maroons

Last MLB appearance
- July 24, 1886, for the St. Louis Maroons

MLB statistics
- Batting average: .000
- Hits: 0
- At bats: 3
- Stats at Baseball Reference

Teams
- St. Louis Maroons (1886)

Louis Henri Pelouze (September 10, 1863 – January 9, 1939) was an American Major League Baseball outfielder. Pelouze played for the St. Louis Maroons in 1886. In 1 career game, he had 0 hits in 3 at-bats. He batted and threw right-handed.

Pelouze was born in Fort Monroe, Virginia and died in New York, New York.
