= Tony Madigan (baseball) =

American baseball player (1868–1954)

- Pitcher
- Born: July 18, 1868; Washington, D.C., U.S.
- Died: December 4, 1954 (aged 86); Washington, D.C., U.S.
- Batted: Unknown Threw: Right

MLB debut
- July 10, 1886, for the Washington Nationals

Last MLB appearance
- September 4, 1886, for the Washington Nationals

MLB statistics
- Win–loss record: 1–13
- Earned run average: 4.87
- Strikeouts: 29
- Stats at Baseball Reference

Teams
- Washington Nationals (NL) (1886)

William J. Madigan (July 18, 1868 – December 4, 1954) was an American professional baseball pitcher for the 1886 Washington Nationals of the National League. He played for the Binghamton Crickets in the minors in 1887.
