= Buck Gladmon =

American baseball player (1863–1890)

- Third baseman
- Born: November 1863; Washington, D.C.
- Died: January 13, 1890 (aged 26); Washington, D.C.
- Batted: Unknown Threw: Unknown

MLB debut
- July 7, 1883, for the Philadelphia Quakers

Last MLB appearance
- July 17, 1886, for the Washington Nationals

MLB statistics
- Batting average: .147
- Home runs: 2
- Runs batted in: 15

Teams
- Philadelphia Quakers (1883); Washington Nationals (1884); Washington Nationals (1886)

James Henry Gladmon (1863–1890) was a Major League Baseball third baseman in the National League and American Association. He died from peritonitis at age 26.
