= Ed Fuller =

American baseball player (1869–1935)

- Pitcher
- Born: March 22, 1869; Washington, D.C., U.S.
- Died: March 15, 1935 (aged 65); Hyattsville, Maryland, U.S.
- Batted: Right Threw: Right

MLB debut
- July 17, 1886, for the Washington Nationals

Last MLB appearance
- July 22, 1886, for the Washington Nationals

MLB statistics
- Win–loss record: 0-1
- Earned run average: 6.92
- Strikeouts: 3
- Stats at Baseball Reference

Teams
- Washington Nationals (1886)

Edward Ashton White Fuller (March 22, 1869 – March 15, 1935) was an American Major League Baseball player for the 1886 Washington Nationals. He was born in Washington, D.C., on March 22, 1868, and died on March 16, 1935, in Hyattsville, Maryland. He was right-handed for both batting and throwing. He was 6'0" and weighed 158 lbs. He played his first game on July 17, 1886, for the Nationals when he was only eighteen years of age. Five days later he played his final major league baseball game for the Nationals on July 22, 1886.
