= John Fox (baseball) =

American baseball player (1859–1893)

- Pitcher
- Born: February 7, 1859; Roxbury, Massachusetts, U.S.
- Died: April 16, 1893 (aged 34); Boston, Massachusetts, U.S.
- Batted: Unknown Threw: Unknown

MLB debut
- June 2, 1881, for the Boston Red Caps

Last MLB appearance
- August 9, 1886, for the Washington Nationals

MLB statistics
- Win–loss record: 13–28
- Earned run average: 4.16
- Strikeouts: 104
- Stats at Baseball Reference

Teams
- Boston Red Caps (1881); Baltimore Orioles (1883); Pittsburgh Alleghenys (1884); Washington Nationals (1886)

John Joseph Fox (February 7, 1859 – April 16, 1893) was an American professional baseball player who played pitcher in the Major Leagues from 1881 to 1886. He played for the Boston Red Caps, Baltimore Orioles, Pittsburgh Alleghenys, and Washington Nationals.
