= Jim Devlin (pitcher) =

American baseball player (1866–1900)

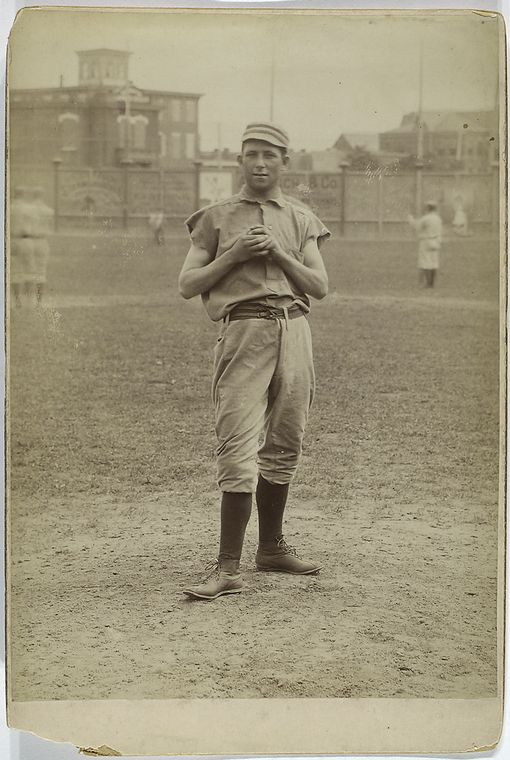
- Pitcher
- Born: April 16, 1866; Troy, New York, U.S.
- Died: December 14, 1900 (aged 34); Troy, New York, U.S.
- Batted: Left Threw: Left

MLB debut
- June 28, 1886, for the New York Giants

Last MLB appearance
- June 17, 1889, for the St. Louis Browns

MLB statistics
- Win–loss record: 11-10
- Earned run average: 3.38
- Strikeouts: 90
- Stats at Baseball Reference

Teams
- New York Giants (1886); Philadelphia Quakers (1887); St. Louis Browns (1888–1889)

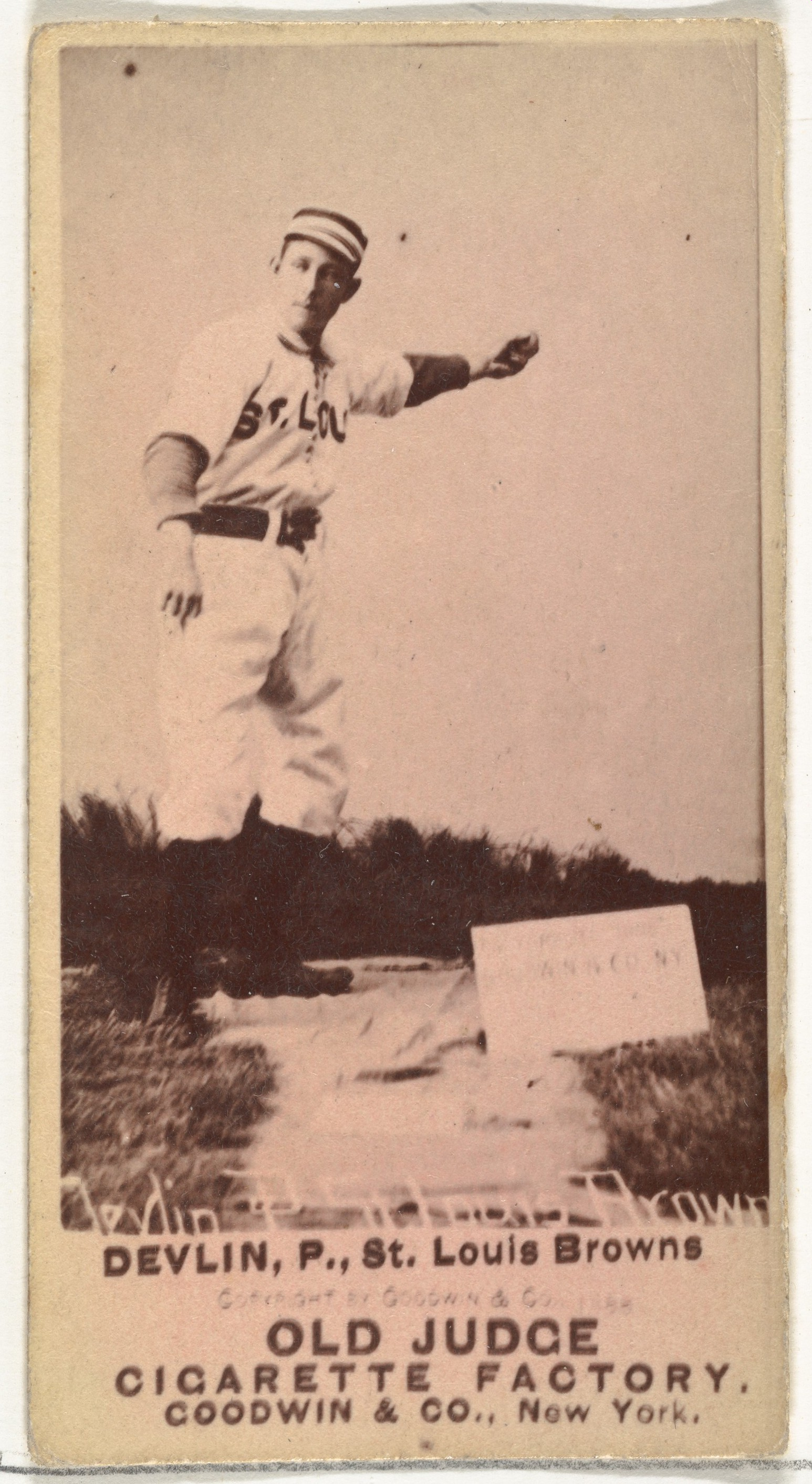
James H. "Jim" Devlin, Pitcher, St. Louis Browns, 1888

James H. Devlin (April 16, 1866 – December 14, 1900) was an American professional baseball player who played pitcher in the major leagues from 1886 to 1889 for three clubs, the New York Giants and Philadelphia Quakers of the National League, and the St. Louis Browns of the American Association.

He died at the age of 34, in his hometown of Troy, New York of typhoid fever, and is interred at St. John's Cemetery in Troy.
