= Frank Gilmore =

American baseball player (1864–1929)

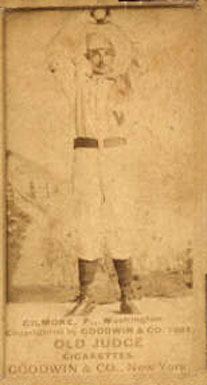
- Pitcher
- Born: April 27, 1864; Webster, Massachusetts, U.S.
- Died: July 21, 1929 (aged 65); Hartford, Connecticut, U.S.
- Batted: Right Threw: Unknown

MLB debut
- September 11, 1886, for the Washington Nationals

Last MLB appearance
- July 4, 1888, for the Washington Nationals

MLB statistics
- Win–loss record: 12-33
- Earned run average: 4.26
- Strikeouts: 212
- Stats at Baseball Reference

Teams
- Washington Nationals (1886–1888)

Frank T. Gilmore (April 27, 1864 in Webster, Massachusetts – July 21, 1929 in Hartford, Connecticut) was an American professional baseball player who played pitcher in the Major Leagues from 1886-1888. He would play for the Washington Nationals.
