= Phil Baker (baseball) =

American baseball player (1856–1940)

- First baseman/Outfielder/Catcher
- Born: September 19, 1856; Philadelphia, Pennsylvania, U.S.
- Died: June 4, 1940 (aged 83); Washington, D.C., U.S.
- Batted: Left Threw: Left

MLB debut
- May 1, 1883, for the Baltimore Orioles

Last MLB appearance
- September 2, 1886, for the Washington Nationals

MLB statistics
- Batting average: .259
- Home runs: 3
- Runs batted in: 34
- Stats at Baseball Reference

Teams
- Baltimore Orioles (1883); Washington Nationals (1884); Washington Nationals (1886)

Philip Baker (September 19, 1856 – June 4, 1940) was an American first baseman, outfielder and catcher in Major League Baseball from 1883–1886. He played in the minors from 1878–1889, with the exception of 1880–1882 when he was blacklisted. Before Baker got blacklisted from the MLB he started his career in the Baltimore Orioles organization, where he spent one year playing (AA) then he went on and played for the Washington Nationals. He played his last game in the majors when he was 29 years old, then returned to the minors to finish his career at the age of 33.

== Sources ==
- Career statistics from Baseball Reference · Baseball Reference (Minors) · Retrosheet · Baseball Almanac
