= Joe Yingling =

American baseball player (1867–1903)

- Pitcher
- Born: February 28, 1867; Baltimore, Maryland
- Died: October 22, 1903 (aged 36); Baltimore, Maryland
- Batted: Right Threw: Left

MLB debut
- May 28, 1886, for the Washington Nationals

Last MLB appearance
- May 28, 1886, for the Washington Nationals

MLB statistics
- Win–loss record: 0–0
- Strikeouts: 1
- Earned run average: 12.00
- Stats at Baseball Reference

Teams
- Washington Nationals (1886)

Joseph Yingling (1867–1903) was a professional baseball pitcher. He appeared in one game in Major League Baseball for the Washington Nationals in 1886. Yingling was born in Baltimore, Maryland, and also died there at age 36 from bronchitis. He was 19 when he played with the Nationals.

Coincidentally, Joe's brother, Charlie Yingling, also appeared in just one major league game, in his case as a shortstop. In 1887, the two were teammates on the minor league baseball team in Haverhill, Massachusetts.
