= George Winkelman =

American baseball player (1865–1960)

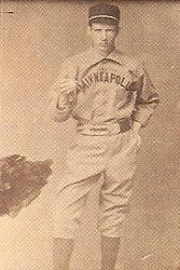
- Pitcher/Outfielder
- Born: February 18, 1865; Washington, D.C., U.S.
- Died: May 19, 1960 (aged 95); Washington, D.C., U.S.
- Batted: Left Threw: Left

MLB debut
- August 2, 1886, for the Washington Nationals

Last MLB appearance
- August 2, 1886, for the Washington Nationals

MLB statistics
- Batting average: .200
- Earned run average: 10.50
- Strikeouts: 4
- Stats at Baseball Reference

Teams
- Washington Nationals (1886)

George Edward Winkelman (February 18, 1865 – May 19, 1960) was an American professional baseball player. He appeared in one game for the 1886 Washington Nationals of the National League. He played in the minors as late as 1895.

In his only major league game, he equalled the record set by Mike Corcoran for the most wild pitches by a pitcher in their first game, with five. He pitched the first six innings of the game, giving up 11 runs on 12 hits and five walks and taking the loss. He was moved to right field to finish the game.
