= John Strike =

American baseball player (born 1865)

- Pitcher
- Born: 1865; Philadelphia, US
- Died: Unknown
- Batted: Unknown Threw: Unknown

MLB debut
- September 24, 1886, for the Philadelphia Quakers

Last MLB appearance
- September 30, 1886, for the Philadelphia Quakers

MLB statistics
- Win–loss record: 1-1
- Earned run average: 4.80
- Strikeouts: 11
- Stats at Baseball Reference

Teams
- Philadelphia Quakers (1886)

John Strike was an American professional baseball player who played pitcher in the Major Leagues for the 1886 Philadelphia Quakers. He played in the Pennsylvania State Association in 1887.
