= Bill Finley =

American baseball player (1863–1912)

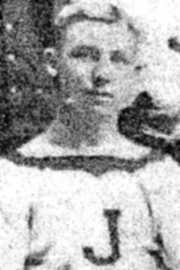
- Catcher/Outfielder
- Born: October 4, 1863; New York City, New York, U.S.
- Died: October 6, 1912 (aged 49); Asbury Park, New Jersey, U.S.
- Batted: Unknown Threw: Unknown

MLB debut
- July 12, 1886, for the New York Giants

Last MLB appearance
- September 27, 1886, for the New York Giants

MLB statistics
- Batting average: .182
- Home runs: 0
- Runs scored: 2
- Stats at Baseball Reference

Teams
- New York Giants (1886)

William James Finley (October 4, 1863 – October 6, 1912) was a 19th-century American professional baseball player. He played catcher and outfielder for the 1886 New York Giants. He attended Columbia University and Manhattan College.

== Death ==
Finley died at age 49 due to valvular heart disease in 1912. He is laid to rest in Calvary Cemetery.
