= George Joyce (baseball) =

American baseball player (1847–1895)

George W. Joyce
- Center fielder
- Born: c. 1847; Washington, D.C., U.S.
- Died: November 9, 1895 (aged 47–48); Washington, D.C., U.S.
- Batted: Unknown Threw: Unknown

MLB debut
- August 14, 1886, for the Washington Nationals

Last MLB appearance
- August 14, 1886, for the Washington Nationals

MLB statistics
- Batting average: .000
- Runs: 0
- Runs batted in: 0
- Stats at Baseball Reference

Teams
- Washington Nationals (1886)

George W. Joyce (c. 1847 – November 9, 1895) was a professional baseball player, who played center field for the 1886 Washington Nationals. He played in one game for the Nationals that season and did not have an at-bat. It is not known whether he batted or fielded with either his left or right hand. Some games or websites list George Joyce as right-handed, however this is because of the lack of information on the player.

== Professional career ==
George Joyce, at the age of 38-39 (unknown due to lack of birth date, only birth year), played on the Washington Nationals team that played in the National League from 1886 to 1889. He played center field during the only game of his career on August 14, 1886, against the Philadelphia Quakers, and never got up to bat. He was the second oldest player on the team, only behind Joe Start, and was at the time the oldest player to make his debut in the post-1876 major leagues as a position player.

Joyce died on November 9, 1895, in Washington, D.C. He was buried in Oak Hill Cemetery.
