= Pat Deasley =

American baseball player (1857–1943)

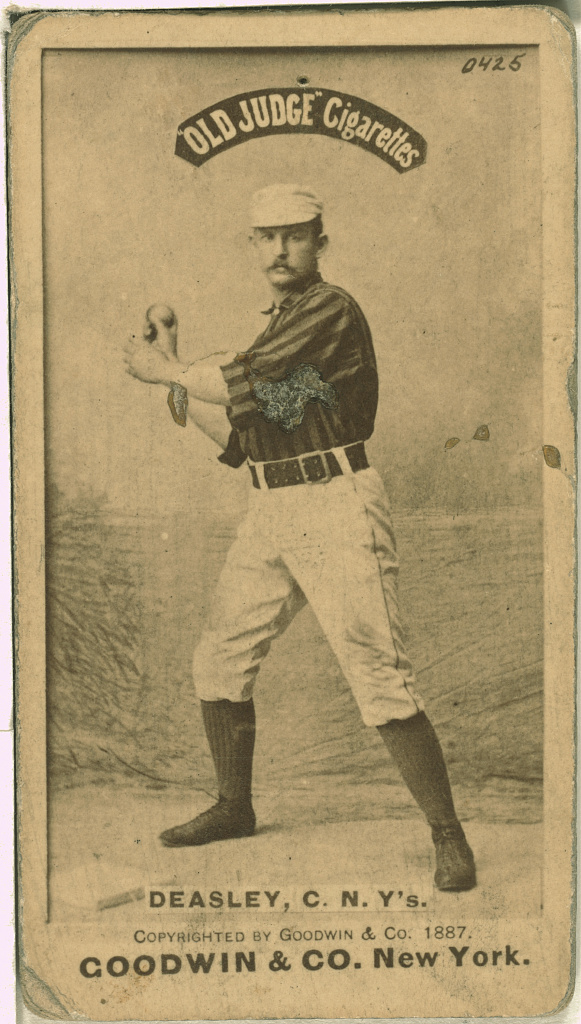
- 1887 baseball card of Deasley
- Catcher
- Born: November 17, 1857; Philadelphia, Pennsylvania, US
- Died: April 1, 1943 (aged 85); Philadelphia, Pennsylvania, US
- Batted: Right Threw: Right

MLB debut
- May 18, 1881, for the Boston Red Stockings

Last MLB appearance
- September 12, 1888, for the Washington Nationals

MLB statistics
- Batting average: .244
- Home runs: 0
- Runs batted in: 120
- Stats at Baseball Reference

Teams
- Boston Red Stockings (1881–1882); St. Louis Browns (1883–1884); New York Giants (1885–1887); Washington Nationals (1888)

Thomas H. "Pat" Deasley (November 17, 1857 – April 1, 1943) was a 19th-century American professional baseball player. Deasley primarily played catcher during his eight-year career from 1881 to 1888. Deasley played for the Boston Red Stockings, St. Louis Browns, New York Giants, and Washington Nationals over the course of his career.

He died on April 1, 1943, in Philadelphia and is interred at the Mount Moriah Cemetery.
