= Henry Zeiher =

American baseball player (1862–1951)

- Catcher
- Born: August 11, 1862; Philadelphia, Pennsylvania, U.S.
- Died: October 14, 1951 (aged 89); Philadelphia, Pennsylvania, U.S.
- Batted: Unknown Threw: Unknown

MLB debut
- June 24, 1886, for the Washington Nationals

Last MLB appearance
- July 5, 1886, for the Washington Nationals

MLB statistics
- Batting average: .000
- Home runs: 0
- Runs batted in: 0
- Stats at Baseball Reference

Teams
- Washington Nationals (1886)

Henry Zeiher (August 11, 1862 – October 14, 1951) was an American professional baseball player who played catcher in the Major Leagues for the 1886 Washington Nationals. Nicknamed "Whitey," he saw only 21 at-bats, striking out at 12 of those, and reaching base in just one via a walk. Defensively, during the 37 opportunities he was given to catch for the Nationals, he committed three errors and allowed 15 passed balls.

He died in Philadelphia on October 14, 1951, and was interred at that city's Greenmount Cemetery.
