= Pete Conway =

American baseball player (1866–1903)

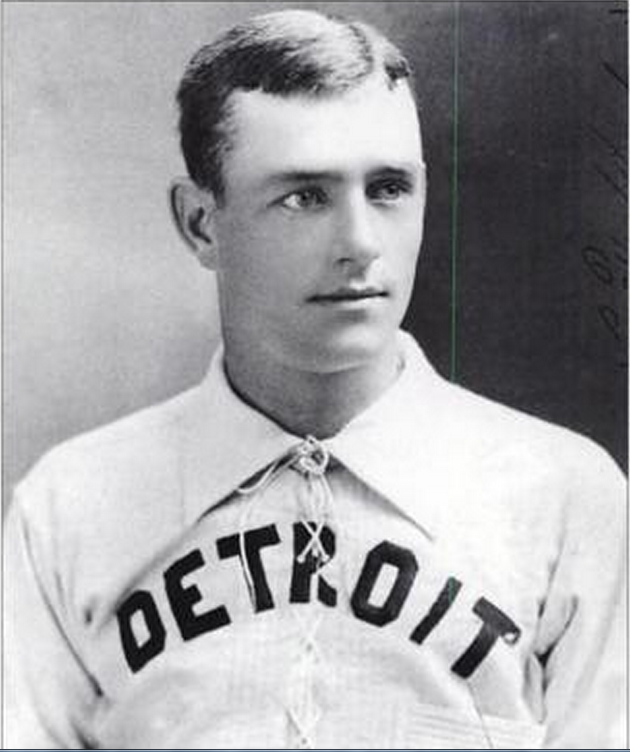
- Pitcher
- Born: October 30, 1866; Burmont, Lansdowne, Pennsylvania, U.S.
- Died: January 13, 1903 (aged 36); Clifton Heights, Pennsylvania, U.S.
- Batted: Right Threw: Right

MLB debut
- August 10, 1885, for the Buffalo Bisons

Last MLB appearance
- May 9, 1889, for the Pittsburgh Alleghenys

MLB statistics
- Win–loss record: 61–61
- Earned run average: 3.59
- Strikeouts: 428
- Stats at Baseball Reference

Teams
- Buffalo Bisons (1885); Kansas City Cowboys (1886); Detroit Wolverines (1886–88); Pittsburgh Alleghenys (1889)

Peter J. Conway (October 30, 1866 – January 13, 1903) was an American right-handed pitcher in Major League Baseball for five seasons with the Buffalo Bisons (1885), Kansas City Cowboys (1886), Detroit Wolverines (1886–1888), and Pittsburgh Alleghenys (1889). He won two games for Detroit in the 1887 World Series and followed in 1888 with a season record of 30 wins and 14 losses. He was also the first coach of the Michigan Wolverines baseball team in 1891 and 1892.

In his five-year career, Conway had a record of 61–61 with 117 complete games and a 3.59 earned run average. He also played 44 games as an outfielder. His career batting average was .224 with nine home runs and 60 runs batted in.

== Early years ==
Conway was born in either 1866 or 1867 in the Burmont section of Lansdowne, Pennsylvania, a southwest suburb of Philadelphia. He was the son of Irish immigrants, Francis and Grace Conway. His father was the superintendent of a guardroom. His mother came to the United States as a child in the 1850s. Conway had three brothers, Michael (born c. 1858), James (born 1859) and Frank (born c. 1864). His older brother James Conway played Major League Baseball as a pitcher for the Brooklyn Atlantics and Philadelphia Athletics in 1884 and 1885.

== Baseball player ==
=== Buffalo Bisons ===
Conway began pitching in Major League Baseball with the Buffalo Bisons of the National League in 1885. He made his Major League debut on August 10, 1885. He pitched a six-hit complete game victory in his debut against his hometown team, the Philadelphia Phillies. The World of New York reported on Buffalo's rookie pitcher: "The Buffalo Club tried Conway, of the local Solar Tip Club, in the box today, and he proved quite a success. The six hits obtained by the Philadelphians were scattered, two being made in the first inning and one each in the second, third, fifth and sixth. In the fourth inning, Conway struck out the side, saving a man on third base."

One day after his Major League debut, Conway pitched his second complete game victory, this time against St. Louis. Conway allowed only four hits up to the eighth inning in the game. Two days later, The New York Times took note: "Conway, Buffalo's new pitcher, is handling the ball very cleverly." Later that week, The New York Times added: "Conway, Buffalo's new pitcher, is said to be a first-class man. He appears to be doing good work."

At the end of September 1885, Conway lost a game against the Brooklyn Giants at the Polo Grounds. Although Brooklyn won the game 11–2, The New York Times again praised the effort of the young Conway: "With the exception of the second inning Conway pitched a good game, and was very effective. The support given him, however, was of the worst possible character, and allowed the local men to tally unearned runs with apparent ease."

During the 1885 season, the 18-year-old rookie appeared in 27 games and pitched 26 complete games. As his debut came on August 11, his 26 complete games were thrown over a seven-week period in August and September – a remarkable average of almost four complete games per week. Conway compiled a record of 10 wins and 17 losses for a Buffalo team that finished in seventh place (next-to-last) with a 38–74 record.

=== Kansas City Cowboys ===
After the 1885 season, the Buffalo franchise folded, and Conway signed with the Kansas City Cowboys of the National League. Again, Conway played for a team that finished the year in seventh place, as the Cowboys compiled a 30–91 record. Conway appeared in 34 games for the Cowboys, 31 as a starter, and threw 30 complete games. He compiled a record of 5 wins and 15 losses.

=== Detroit Wolverines ===
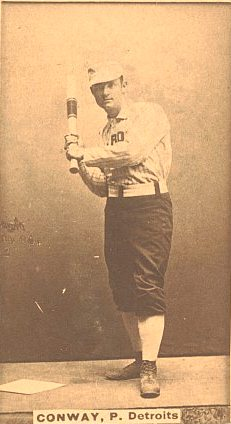
Pete Conway, 1887 Old Judge baseball card

Conway was traded late in the 1886 season to the Detroit Wolverines, where he pitched 11 complete games in 1886 with a record of 6–5. On September 2, 1886, Conway defeated the Brooklyn Giants 8–2 in a game played in Detroit. The New York Times wrote that the Giants were unable "to bat the curves of young Conway, Detroit's new pitcher", adding that Conway "handled the ball in rare style, and, with the exception of Connor, completely puzzled the batters from New York."

In his first full season in Detroit, Conway played on the 1887 Detroit Wolverines team that won the National League pennant. Conway pitched 16 complete games and led the team with a 2.90 ERA, though his record was 8–9. When he defeated his hometown Phillies at Philadelphia in late August 1887, The New York Times wrote: "Conway pitched a great game of ball for Detroit to-day, holding local players down to three actual hits and giving only three bases on balls. ... The Phillies ... were seemingly dazed by the effectiveness of Conway's pitching."

Conway pitched four games in the 1887 World Series against the American Association St. Louis Browns, winning two and losing two, as the Wolverines won the World Series 10 games to 5.

Conway had his best season in 1888. He appeared in 45 games for Detroit and pitched 43 complete games and 391 innings. He finished the season with a record of 30 wins and 14 losses, and his winning percentage (.682) was the second highest in the National League. It would be 80 years before another Detroit pitcher would win 30 games, when Denny McLain did it for the Detroit Tigers in 1968.

=== Pittsburgh Alleghenies ===
At the end of the 1888 season, the Detroit franchise disbanded. Conway traveled to New York in November 1888 to offer his services to other clubs at a meeting of the National League. William A. Nimick, the president of the Pittsburgh Alleghenys, offered Conway a salary of $3,500 per year, but Conway refused to sign unless he was paid $4,000 per year. Conway indicated that he preferred to play for the Boston Beaneaters, where four of his Detroit teammates known as the "Big Four" (Dan Brouthers, Hardy Richardson, Jack Rowe, and Deacon White) had signed. However, Conway was told that, following the breakup of the Detroit franchise, he "had been allocated to Pittburg." After talking with Fred Dunlap, a former teammate who had played for the Alleghenies in 1888, Conway ultimately agreed to sign a two-year contract for $3,500 per year.

During the 1889 season, Conway appeared in only three games for the Alleghenies. Though he won two of the three games, his earned run average soared to 4.91 – more than double his 1888 earned run average of 2.26. Conway appeared in his final Major League game on May 9, 1889. He was suspended without pay by the Alleghenies who claimed that he was not in condition to play. It was reported in the press that Conway had "snapped a cord in his arm," and that his "anterior detroid muscle was out of whack." The Alleghenies' suspension of Conway without pay following his injury sparked an early controversy over players' rights. In August 1889, newspaper accounts noted: "Pete Conway will be backed by the brotherhood in a suit against the Pittsburg club this fall. He was laid off without pay, but reports for duty, every day."

In September 1899, Conway was reported to be using electricity on his arm to offset the effect of the injury.

=== Players' League ===
In March 1890, Conway signed with the Brooklyn franchise in the newly formed Players' League. By late June, newspapers reported that he had been with the team for two months, but had not yet appeared in a game. A reporter quipped, "If he is drawing salary he is rather an expensive ornament." By the beginning of August 1890, it was reported that "Conway has not drawn a dollar from the Brooklyn club" and that he was "at his home in Philadelphia."

== Baseball coach ==
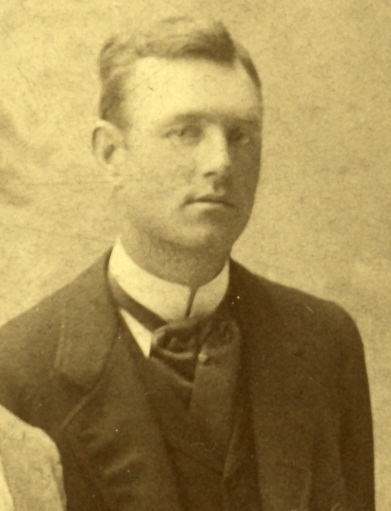
Pete Conway, Michigan's first baseball coach in 1891

In 1891, the University of Michigan hired Conway as the first coach of the Michigan Wolverines baseball team. Although Michigan had fielded a baseball team since the 1860s, the team had never engaged the services of a professional coach. H. T. Abbott, the student manager of the baseball team, attempted to hire Billy Sunday and Charlie Bennett, but both declined the offer. Conway accepted and became Michigan's "first official coach." Conway arrived in Ann Arbor at the beginning of April 1891 and remained through the end of May. The 1891 Wolverines finished with a 10–3 record, including victories over Harvard (4–3) and Cornell (8–6). Conway returned as Michigan's baseball coach in 1892. In two years as Michigan's baseball coach, Conway compiled a 22–9–1 record (.703).

== Later years and family ==
At the time of the 1900 U.S. Census, Conway was living with his mother (Grace, born 1840 in Ireland) and three brothers in Clifton Heights, Pennsylvania, a suburb of Philadelphia located approximately a mile from where he was born. His occupation was listed as mule skinner. Conway died in 1903 at age 36 in Clifton Heights.
