= Jim Donnelly (baseball) =

American baseball player (1865–1915)

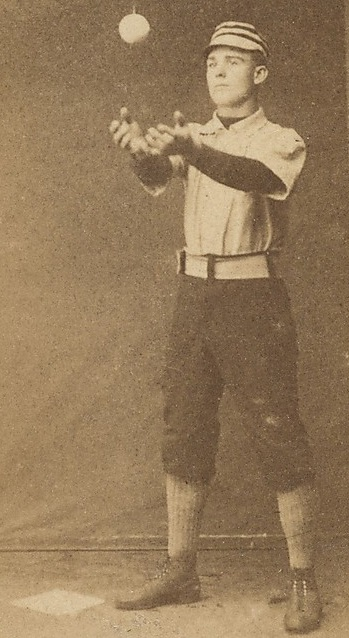
- Jim Donnelly Old Judge baseball card, 1887
- Third baseman
- Born: July 19, 1865; New Haven, Connecticut, U.S.
- Died: March 5, 1915 (aged 49); Meriden, Connecticut, U.S.
- Batted: Right Threw: Right

MLB debut
- August 11, 1884, for the Indianapolis Hoosiers

Last MLB appearance
- May 12, 1898, for the St. Louis Browns

MLB statistics
- Batting average: .230
- Home runs: 2
- Runs batted in: 237
- Stolen bases: 173
- Stats at Baseball Reference

Teams
- Indianapolis Hoosiers (1884); Detroit Wolverines (1885); Kansas City Cowboys (1886); Washington Nationals (1887–89); St. Louis Browns (1890); Columbus Solons (1891); Baltimore Orioles (1896); Pittsburgh Pirates (1897); New York Giants (1897); St. Louis Browns (1898)

James B. Donnelly (July 19, 1865 – March 5, 1915) was an American professional baseball player whose career spanned from 1884 to 1900. He played all or part of 11 seasons in Major League Baseball, principally as a third baseman, for nine different major league clubs. In his 11 major league seasons, Donnelly compiled a .230 career batting average and led the National League's third basemen with 73 errors in 1886 and 275 assists in 1887.

Donnelly's longest stints were with the Washington Nationals (243 games from 1887 to 1889), the Kansas City Cowboys (113 games in 1886), and the Baltimore Orioles (106 games in 1896). In 1896, he raised his batting average to .328 and was the starting third baseman for the 1896 Baltimore Orioles team than won the National League pennant with a 90–39 record.

== Early years ==
Donnelly was born in 1865 in New Haven, Connecticut. His parents, Michael and Sarah Donnelly, were immigrants from Ireland. His father worked in a lock shop.

== Professional baseball players ==
=== Indianapolis Hoosiers ===
Donnelly began his professional baseball career in 1884 with the Terre Haute, Indiana baseball club in the Northwestern League. In August of that same year, he made his major league debut with the Indianapolis Hoosiers of the National League. In 40 games with the Hoosiers, Donnelly compiled a .254 batting average

In 1885, the Hoosiers left the National League, lost their major league status, and joined the newly formed Western League in 1885. Donnelly remained with the Hoosiers at the start of the 1885 season and compiled a .211 batting average in 32 games. The Hoosiers were the dominant team in the Western League, compiling an .880 winning percentage.

=== Detroit Wolverines ===
In mid June 1885, the Western League disbanded, and a mad rush developed to sign the players on the Indianapolis roster, a line-up that included Sam Thompson, Deacon McGuire, Sam Crane, Chub Collins, Mox McQuery, Gene Moriarty, and Dan Casey. Donnelly was sold in a deal that sent most of the Hoosiers' roster to the Detroit Wolverines.

Donnelly appeared in 56 games, all at third base, for the Wolverines during the 1885 season. He compiled a .232 batting average with four doubles, three triples, one home run and 22 RBIs.

=== Kansas City Cowboys ===
Prior to the 1886 season, Donnelly was purchased by the Kansas City Cowboys from the Wolverines. He appeared in 113 games, all at third base, for the Cowboys in 1886 and compiled a .201 batting average. He ranked among the leading National League third basemen that year with 73 errors (1st), 153 putouts (2nd), 13 double plays turned (3rd), and a 3.52 range factor (3rd).

=== Washington Nationals ===
In March 1887, the Washington Nationals purchased rights to Donnelly for $2,500. He played three seasons with the Nationals from 1887 to 1889. He was the team's starting third baseman during the 1887 and 1888 seasons, appearing in 239 games during those two seasons. During the 1887 season, he ranked among the leading National League third basemen with 63 errors (2nd), 21 double plays turned (2nd), a 3.57 range factor (4th), and 136 putouts (5th). He also ranked second in the league with 51 errors at third base in 1888.

In 1889, Donnelly appeared in only four games for the Nationals and spent most of the season with the newly formed Detroit Wolverines of the International Association. He compiled a .285 batting average in 89 games for Detroit in 1889 and played another 16 games for Detroit in 1890.

=== St. Louis and Columbus ===
On July 19, 1890, Donnelly was dealt by Detroit to the St. Louis Browns of the American Association. In his return to the major leagues, he compiled a career high .333 batting average in 11 games with the Browns.

Donnelly began the 1891 season with Omaha in the Western Association. He compiled a .268 batting average in 58 games with Omaha. In July 1891, Donnelly jumped from Omaha to the Columbus Solons of the American Association. He appeared in only 17 games for the Solons and was released on August 25, 1891.

=== Return to the minors ===
After his brief stint with the Solons, Donnelly again returned to the minor leagues, playing in the Eastern League for four years from 1892 to 1895, including stints with the Buffalo Bisons, New Haven Nutmegs, Troy Trojans, and Springfield Ponies. He compiled a .334 batting average in 101 games with Troy in 1893 and hit .305 in 93 games for Springfield in 1895.

=== Baltimore Orioles ===
Donnelly returned to the major leagues in 1896 with the Baltimore Orioles. Donnelly appeared in 106 games as the team's third baseman, replacing John McGraw at the position. He joined an Orioles team that was managed by Ned Hanlon, featured Hughie Jennings and Willie Keeler, and won the National League pennant with a 90–39 record. In May 1896, The Sporting Life wrote that "[a] prettier or a headier fielder than Jim Donnelly it would be difficult to find", but found it to be a pity that he was not more capable with the bat. In the end, Donnelly's bat perked up considerably in his only season with the Orioles, as he compiled a .328 batting average with 14 doubles, 10 triples, 71 RBIs, and 38 stolen bases.

=== Final years ===
In November 1896, the Orioles traded Donnelly with Steve Brodie to the Pittsburgh Pirates for Elmer Horton, Tom O'Brien, Jake Stenzel and Harry Truby. Donnelly appeared in 44 games for the Pirates and finished the 1887 season appearing in 23 games for the New York Giants. His batting average in 1897 dropped to .191 – a decline of .137 points from the previous year.

In November 1897, the Giants traded Donnelly and Ducky Holmes with $3,500 to the St. Louis Browns for Mike Grady and Fred Hartman. In early April 1898, The Sporting News questioned Donnelly's readiness for major league play: "Jim Donnelly has not shown up well so far. He has dicky legs, his fielding has not been particularly brilliant, and his batting has been lamentably weak." On May 12, 1898, Donnelly appeared in his first and only game for the Browns – Donnelly's last in the major leagues. He had a double in his only at bat in the game.

Although his major league career ended in May 1898, Donnelly continued to play in the minor leagues through the 1900 season, including stints with the Syracuse Stars, New Haven Blues, and Springfield Ponies.

== Later years ==
At the time of the 1900 United States census, Donnelly was living with his mother, Sarah, and sister, Minnie, in New Haven, Connecticut. His occupation was listed as a ball player. Donnelly was married in 1909 to Elizabeth Kissan. By 1910, Donnelly and his wife were living in Stamford, Connecticut, and he was employed as a railroad brakeman. Donnelly died in 1915 at age 49 in Meriden, Connecticut.

Donnelly played during the same time period as James Henry Donnelly, who played third base for the Kansas City Cowboys in 1884. Their statistics are often conflated into a single player record, but the two were unrelated.
