= Harry Decker =

American baseball player (born 1864)

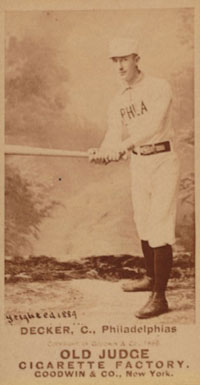
- Catcher
- Born: September 3, 1864; Lockport, Illinois, U.S.
- Batted: Right Threw: Right

MLB debut
- August 23, 1884, for the Indianapolis Hoosiers

Last MLB appearance
- October 3, 1890, for the Pittsburgh Pirates

MLB statistics
- Batting average: .242
- Home runs: 5
- Runs batted in: 49
- Stats at Baseball Reference

Teams
- Indianapolis Hoosiers (1884); Kansas City Cowboys (1884); Detroit Wolverines (1886); Washington Nationals (1886); Philadelphia Phillies (1889–1890); Pittsburgh Pirates (1890)

Earle Harry Decker (September 3, 1864 - ?) was an American Major League Baseball catcher. Walker was born in Lockport, Illinois. He played four seasons in Major League Baseball, with the Indianapolis Hoosiers, Kansas City Cowboys, Detroit Wolverines, Washington Nationals, Philadelphia Phillies and Pittsburgh Pirates. Decker's primary position was catcher, but he also played outfield, first base, second base, third base and shortstop. SABR (Society for American Baseball Research) says Decker is credited by many as the inventor of the catcher's mitt. He also served time in San Quentin Penitentiary, California, and a picture of him on the jail baseball team survives. It is unknown where he went from there, receding into the mists of history. As is the case with approximately 200 other 19th-century ballplayers, the date of his death is unknown.
