= Cliff Carroll =

American baseball player (1859–1923)

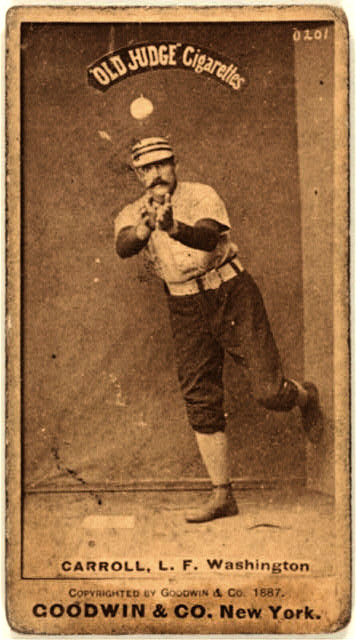
- Outfielder
- Born: October 18, 1859; Clay Grove, Iowa, U.S.
- Died: June 12, 1923 (aged 63); Portland, Oregon, U.S.
- Batted: Switch Threw: Right

MLB debut
- August 3, 1882, for the Providence Grays

Last MLB appearance
- September 27, 1893, for the Boston Beaneaters

MLB statistics
- Batting average: .251
- Home runs: 31
- Runs batted in: 423
- Stats at Baseball Reference

Teams
- Providence Grays (1882–1885); Washington Senators (1886–1887); Pittsburgh Alleghenys (1888); Chicago Colts (1890–1891); St. Louis Browns (1892); Boston Beaneaters (1893)

Career highlights and awards
- Led the National League in at bats with 582 in 1890

Samuel Clifford Carroll (October 18, 1859 – June 12, 1923) was an American Major League Baseball outfielder. He played professionally for the Providence Grays, Pittsburgh Alleghenys, Washington Senators, Chicago Colts, St. Louis Browns, and Boston Beaneaters.

== Biography ==
Carroll was born in Clay Grove, Iowa. He played his first professional game on August 3, 1882, for the Providence Grays. Carroll played professionally for eleven seasons from 1882 to 1893.

He stopped playing professionally in 1889 to be a farmer, but missed playing baseball and returned to major league baseball in 1890 with the Chicago Cubs. That season he achieved career highs in three offensive and three defensive categories. Carroll stopped playing in the majors in 1893.

Carroll died at the age of 63 in Portland, Oregon, and is interred at Lincoln Memorial Park.

== See also ==
- List of Major League Baseball career stolen bases leaders
