= Washington Nationals (1886–1889) =

National League baseball team from 1886 to 1889

- Founded: 1886
- Dissolved: 1889
- League: National League
- Location: Washington, D.C.
- Ballpark: Swampoodle Grounds
- Colors: Copper, white
- Owner: Harry Von der Horst

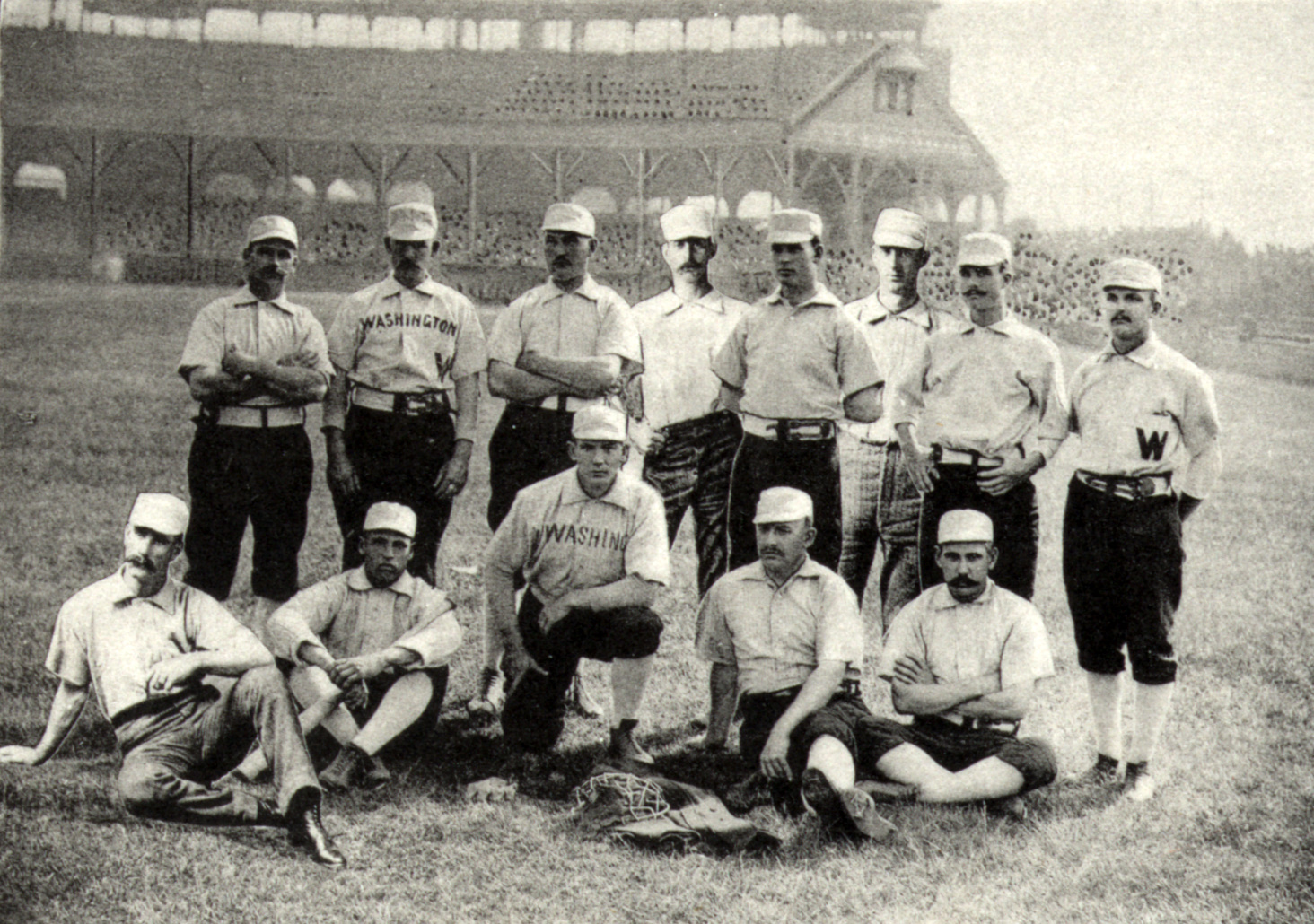
1888 Washington Nationals at Boston's South End Grounds.

The Washington Nationals, sometimes referred to as the Washington Statesmen or Senators, were a professional baseball team in the mid to late 1880s. They existed for a period of four years as a member of the National League (NL) from 1886 to 1889. During their four-year tenure they had six different managers and compiled a record of 163–337, for a .326 winning percentage. The franchise played their home games at Swampoodle Grounds, otherwise known as Capitol Park (II).

Their most notable player was catcher Connie Mack, who went on to a Hall of Fame career as manager of the American League Philadelphia Athletics from 1901 to 1950. Outfielder Dummy Hoy, notable for being deaf, played for the 1888 and 1889 Washington teams. Jim Donnelly also spent time with the Nationals.

== Baseball Hall of Famers ==
Washington Nationals Hall of Famers
Inductee	Position	Tenure	Inducted
Connie Mack	C	1886–1889	1937

== See also ==
- 1886 Washington Nationals season
- 1887 Washington Nationals season
- 1888 Washington Nationals season
- 1889 Washington Nationals season
- Washington Nationals (1886–1889) all-time roster

== See also ==
- Washington Nationals (disambiguation)
- Washington Senators (disambiguation)
- Washington Nationals current MLB team
