= 1888 New York Giants season =

1888 New York Giants
- World champions National League champions
- League: National League
- Ballpark: Polo Grounds
- City: New York City
- Record: 84–47 (.641)
- League place: 1st
- Owner: John B. Day
- Manager: Jim Mutrie

The 1888 New York Giants season was the franchise's sixth season.

Claiming six future Hall of Famers (Roger Connor, Mickey Welch, Buck Ewing, Tim Keefe, Jim O'Rourke, and John Montgomery Ward), the team won the National League pennant by nine games and defeated the St. Louis Browns in the "World's Championship".

Keefe led the league in several major statistical categories, including wins, winning percentage, strikeouts, and earned run average.

== Regular season ==
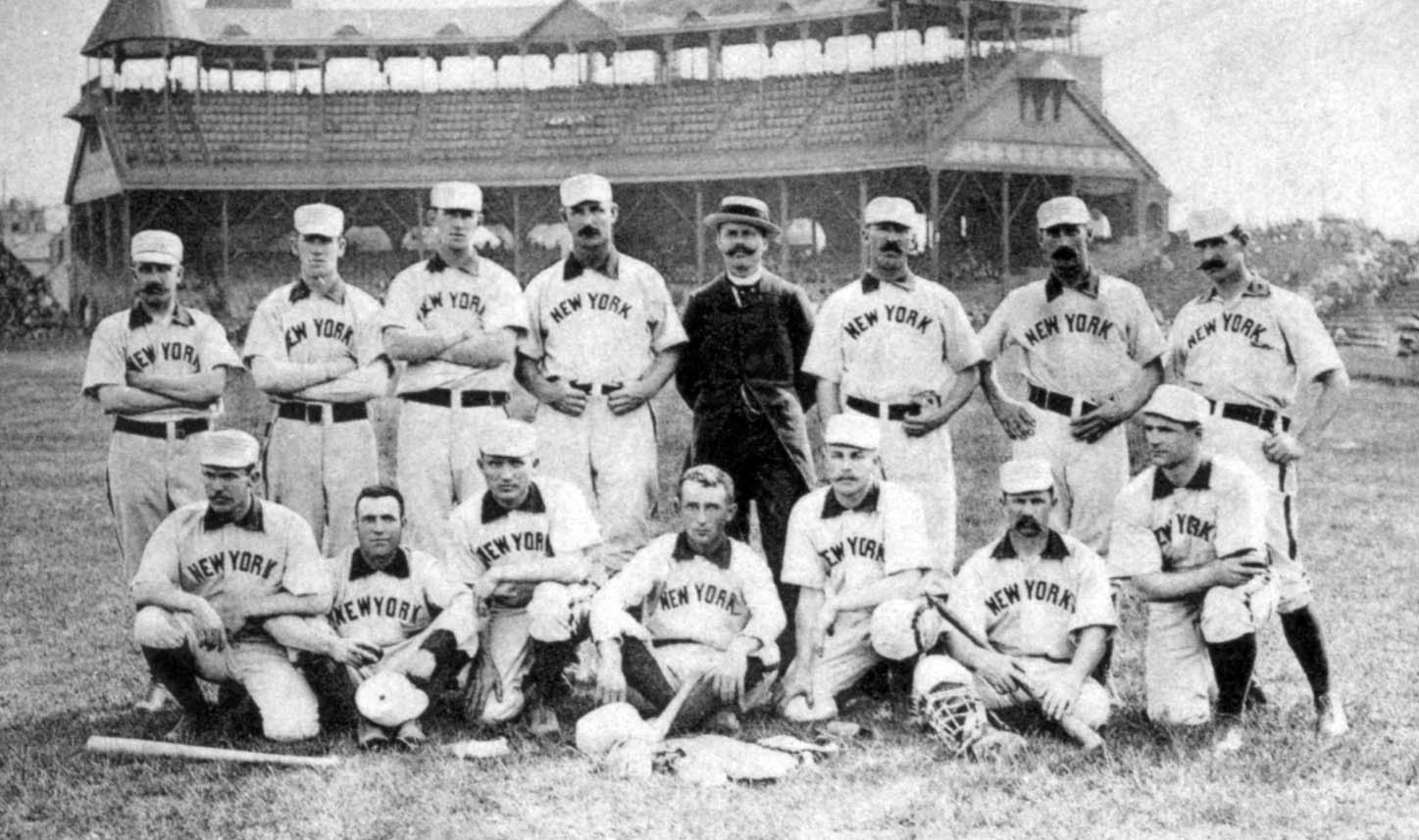
1888 New York Giants

=== Season standings ===
National League
Team	W	L	Pct.	GB	Home	Road
New York Giants	84	47	.641	—	44‍–‍23	40‍–‍24
Chicago White Stockings	77	58	.570	9	43‍–‍27	34‍–‍31
Philadelphia Quakers	69	61	.531	14½	37‍–‍29	32‍–‍32
Boston Beaneaters	70	64	.522	15½	36‍–‍30	34‍–‍34
Detroit Wolverines	68	63	.519	16	40‍–‍26	28‍–‍37
Pittsburgh Alleghenys	66	68	.493	19½	37‍–‍30	29‍–‍38
Indianapolis Hoosiers	50	85	.370	36	31‍–‍35	19‍–‍50
Washington Nationals	48	86	.358	37½	26‍–‍38	22‍–‍48

=== Record vs. opponents ===
1888 National League record Sources:
Team	BSN	CHI	DET	IND	NYG	PHI	PIT	WAS
Boston	—	7–12	10–8–1	11–9	8–12	9–10	10–8–2	15–5
Chicago	12–7	—	10–10	14–6	11–8–1	8–10	9–11	13–6
Detroit	8–10–1	10–10	—	11–8	7–11–2	11–7	10–10	11–7
Indianapolis	9–11	6–14	8–11	—	5–14	4–13	6–14	12–8–1
New York	12–8	8–11–1	11–7–2	14–5	—	14–5–1	10–7–2	15–4–1
Philadelphia	10–9	10–8	7–11	13–4	5–14–1	—	14–6–1	10–9
Pittsburgh	8–10–2	11–9	10–10	14–6	7–10–2	6–14–1	—	10–9
Washington	5–15	6–13	7–11	8–12–1	4–15–1	9–10	9–10	—

=== Roster ===
1888 New York Giants
Roster
Pitchers: Ed Crane; Tim Keefe; Ledell Titcomb; Mickey Welch; Stump Weidman	Catchers: William Brown; Buck Ewing; Pat Murphy; Infielders: Elmer Cleveland; Roger Connor; Gil Hatfield; Danny Richardson; John Ward; Art Whitney	Outfielders: Elmer Foster; Bill George; George Gore; Jim O'Rourke; Mike Slattery; Mike Tiernan	Manager: Jim Mutrie

== Player stats ==
=== Batting ===
==== Starters by position ====
Note: Pos = Position; G = Games played; AB = At bats; H = Hits; Avg. = Batting average; HR = Home runs; RBI = Runs batted in

Pos	Player	G	AB	H	Avg.	HR	RBI
C	Buck Ewing	103	415	127	.306	6	58
1B	Roger Connor	134	481	140	.291	14	71
2B	Danny Richardson	135	561	127	.226	8	61
SS	John Ward	122	510	128	.251	2	49
3B	Art Whitney	90	328	72	.220	1	28
OF	Jim O'Rourke	107	409	112	.274	4	50
OF	Mike Tiernan	113	443	130	.293	9	52
OF	Mike Slattery	103	391	96	.246	1	35

==== Other batters ====
Note: G = Games played; AB = At bats; H = Hits; Avg. = Batting average; HR = Home runs; RBI = Runs batted in

Player	G	AB	H	Avg.	HR	RBI
George Gore	64	254	56	.220	2	17
Elmer Foster	37	136	20	.147	0	10
Pat Murphy	28	106	18	.170	0	4
Gil Hatfield	28	105	19	.181	0	9
William Brown	20	59	16	.271	0	6
Elmer Cleveland	9	34	8	.235	2	7

=== Pitching ===
==== Starting pitchers ====
Note: G = Games pitched; IP = Innings pitched; W = Wins; L = Losses; ERA = Earned run average; SO = Strikeouts

Player	G	IP	W	L	ERA	SO
Tim Keefe	51	434.1	35	12	1.74	335
Mickey Welch	47	425.1	26	19	1.93	167
Ledell Titcomb	23	197.0	14	8	2.24	129
Ed Crane	12	92.2	5	6	2.43	58
Bill George	4	33.2	2	1	1.34	26
Stump Weidman	2	18.0	1	1	3.50	5

==== Relief pitchers ====
Note: G = Games pitched; W = Wins; L = Losses; SV = Saves; ERA = Earned run average; SO = Strikeouts

Player	G	W	L	SV	ERA	SO
Buck Ewing	2	0	0	0	2.57	6

== 1888 World Series ==
The Giants beat the American Association champion St. Louis Browns in the World Series, six games to four.
