= 1888 World Series =

Pre-modern baseball championship

1888 World's Championship Series
- The "Hall Cup" was awarded to the Giants for defeating the Browns in the 1888 series. Now on display at the National Baseball Hall of Fame and Museum in Cooperstown, New York, the exhibit says the cup is "baseball's oldest existing World Championship trophy".
Team (Wins)	Manager(s)	Season
New York Giants (6)	Jim Mutrie	84–47–7 (.634), GA: 9
St. Louis Browns (4)	Charles Comiskey	92–43–2 (.679), GA: 6½
- Dates: October 16–27
- Venue(s): Polo Grounds (New York); Sportsman's Park (St. Louis)

The 1888 World Series was an end-of-the-year professional baseball season championship playoff series between the National League champion New York Giants and the old American Association champion St. Louis Browns.

The Giants won, 6 games to 4. Hall of Fame pitcher Tim Keefe went 4–0.

This was the Browns' last appearance in a championship tournament and pre-modern-era World Series, the last of their four consecutive AA pennants. The club would later join the NL in 1892 and be renamed as the St. Louis Cardinals by 1900. It would be 1926 before they would win their next league pennant.

== Game summary ==
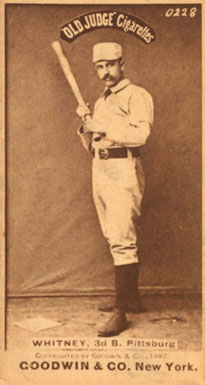
Art Whitney

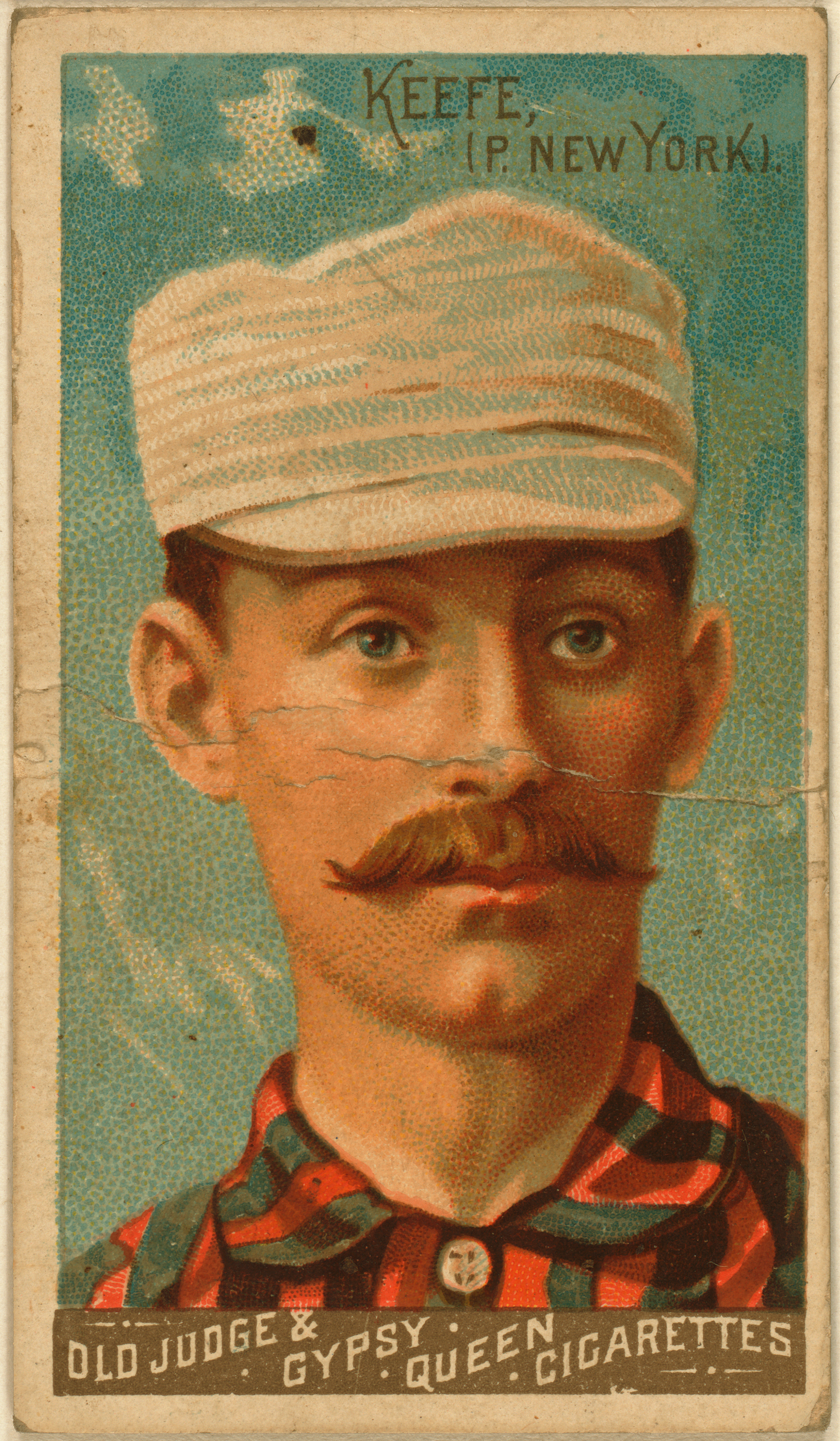
Tim Keefe

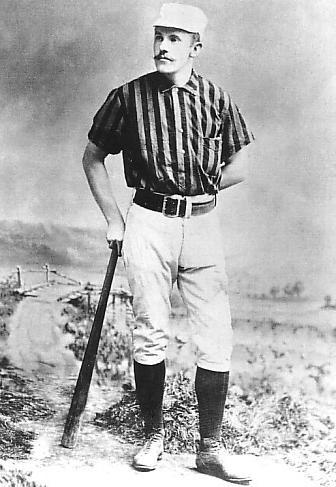
John Montgomery Ward

=== Game 1 ===
October 16, 1888, at Polo Grounds in New York City; day game

Team	1	2	3	4	5	6	7	8	9	R	H	E
St. Louis Browns	0	0	1	0	0	0	0	0	0	1	3	5
New York Giants	0	1	1	0	0	0	0	0	x	2	2	4
Win: Tim Keefe (1–0) Loss: Silver King (0–1)
Home Runs: none

=== Game 2 ===
October 17, 1888, at Polo Grounds in New York City; day game

Team	1	2	3	4	5	6	7	8	9	R	H	E
St. Louis Browns	0	1	0	0	0	0	0	0	2	3	7	4
New York Giants	0	0	0	0	0	0	0	0	0	0	6	1
Win: Elton Chamberlain (1–0) Loss: Mickey Welch (0–1)
Home Runs: none

=== Game 3 ===
October 18, 1888, at Polo Grounds in New York City; day game

Team	1	2	3	4	5	6	7	8	9	R	H	E
St. Louis Browns	0	0	0	0	0	0	0	1	1	2	5	5
New York Giants	2	0	0	1	0	0	1	0	x	4	5	2
Win: Tim Keefe (2–0) Loss: Silver King (0–2)
Home Runs: none

=== Game 4 ===
October 19, 1888, at Washington Park in Brooklyn, New York; day game

Team	1	2	3	4	5	6	7	8	9	R	H	E
New York Giants	1	0	4	0	1	0	0	0	0	6	8	2
St. Louis Browns	0	0	1	0	0	0	0	2	0	3	7	4
Win: Ed Crane (1–0) Loss: Elton Chamberlain (1–1)
Home Runs: none

=== Game 5 ===
October 20, 1888, at Polo Grounds in New York City; day game

Team	1	2	3	4	5	6	7	8	R	H	E
St. Louis Browns	0	0	3	0	0	1	0	0	4	5	5
New York Giants	1	0	0	0	0	0	0	5	6	9	2
Win: Tim Keefe (3–0) Loss: Silver King (0–3)
Home Runs: none

=== Game 6 ===
October 22, 1888, at Philadelphia Baseball Grounds in Philadelphia; day game

(last World Series game to be played at a neutral site until 2020 World Series)

Team	1	2	3	4	5	6	7	8	R	H	E
New York Giants	0	0	0	1	0	3	3	5	12	13	5
St. Louis Browns	3	0	1	0	0	0	0	1	5	3	7
Win: Mickey Welch (1–1) Loss: Elton Chamberlain (1–2)
Home Runs: none

=== Game 7 ===
October 24, 1888, at Sportsman's Park in St. Louis, Missouri; day game

Team	1	2	3	4	5	6	7	8	R	H	E
New York Giants	0	3	0	0	0	2	0	0	5	11	3
St. Louis Browns	0	0	0	3	0	0	0	4	7	8	3
Win: Silver King (1–3) Loss: Ed Crane (1–1)
Home Runs: none

=== Game 8 ===
October 25, 1888, at Sportsman's Park in St. Louis, Missouri; day game

Team	1	2	3	4	5	6	7	8	9	R	H	E
New York Giants	1	0	3	1	0	0	0	0	6	11	12	2
St. Louis Browns	0	0	0	1	0	0	1	1	0	3	5	6
Win: Tim Keefe (4–0) Loss: Elton Chamberlain (1–3)
Home Runs: Buck Ewing, Mike Tiernan

=== Game 9 ===
October 26, 1888, at Sportsman's Park in St. Louis, Missouri; day game

Team	1	2	3	4	5	6	7	8	9	10	R	H	E
New York Giants	0	3	5	0	0	0	1	2	0	0	11	14	5
St. Louis Browns	1	4	0	0	2	0	2	0	2	3	14	15	4
Win: Jim Devlin (1–0) Loss: Bill George (0–1)
Home Runs: Tip O'Neill

=== Game 10 ===
October 27, 1888, at Sportsman's Park in St. Louis, Missouri; day game

Team	1	2	3	4	5	6	7	8	9	R	H	E
New York Giants	3	1	0	0	0	0	0	2	1	7	13	8
St. Louis Browns	0	1	0	5	0	5	4	2	1	18	17	3
Win: Elton Chamberlain (2–3) Loss: Ledell Titcomb (0–1)
Home Runs: Bill George, Tip O'Neill, Tommy McCarthy

== Series stats ==
=== New York Giants ===
==== Batting ====
Player	G	PA	AB	R	H	2B	3B	HR	RBI	SB	BB	SO	AVG	OBP	SLG
William Brown	2	8	8	1	3	1	0	0	0	0	0	0	0.375	0.375	0.500
Roger Connor	7	27	23	7	7	1	2	0	3	4	4	0	0.304	0.407	0.522
Ed Crane	2	7	7	1	1	0	0	0	2	0	0	1	0.143	0.143	0.143
Buck Ewing	7	27	26	5	9	0	2	1	6	5	1	3	0.346	0.370	0.615
Bill George	2	9	9	2	3	1	0	1	4	0	0	2	0.333	0.333	0.778
George Gore	3	13	11	5	5	1	0	0	0	2	2	2	0.455	0.538	0.545
Gil Hatfield	2	9	8	2	2	0	0	0	1	1	1	2	0.250	0.333	0.250
Tim Keefe	4	13	11	2	1	0	0	0	0	1	2	2	0.091	0.231	0.091
Pat Murphy	3	10	10	1	1	0	0	0	1	0	0	0	0.100	0.100	0.100
Jim O'Rourke	10	40	36	4	8	0	0	0	1	3	4	2	0.222	0.300	0.222
Danny Richardson	9	39	36	6	6	2	0	0	6	3	3	5	0.167	0.231	0.222
Mike Slattery	10	39	39	6	8	2	0	0	5	6	0	5	0.205	0.205	0.256
Mike Tiernan	10	46	38	8	13	0	0	1	6	5	8	2	0.342	0.457	0.421
Ledell Titcomb	1	4	4	1	2	1	0	0	1	0	0	0	0.500	0.500	0.750
John Ward	8	30	29	4	11	1	0	0	6	6	1	0	0.379	0.400	0.414
Mickey Welch	2	7	7	2	2	0	0	0	1	0	0	0	0.286	0.286	0.286
Art Whitney	10	38	37	7	12	0	1	0	12	2	1	4	0.324	0.342	0.378
Team totals	10	366	339	64	94	10	5	3	55	38	27	30	0.277	0.331	0

==== Pitching ====
Player	G	W – L	SV	GS	CG	SHO	IP	H	HR	BB	SO	R	ER	ERA
Ed Crane	2	1–1	0	2	2	0	17.0	15	0	6	12	10	4	2.12
Bill George	1	0–1	0	1	1	0	10.0	15	1	3	4	14	8	7.20
Gil Hatfield	1	0–0	0	0	0	0	5.0	12	1	3	2	12	7	12.60
Tim Keefe	4	4–0	0	4	4	0	35.0	18	0	9	30	12	2	0.51
Ledell Titcomb	1	0–1	0	1	0	0	4.0	5	1	2	2	6	3	6.75
Mickey Welch	2	1–1	0	2	2	0	17.0	10	0	9	2	8	5	2.65
Team totals	10	6–4	0	10	9	0	88.0	75	3	32	52	62	29	2.97

=== St. Louis Browns ===
==== Batting ====
Player	G	PA	AB	R	H	2B	3B	HR	RBI	SB	BB	SO	AVG	OBP	SLG
Jack Boyle	4	18	16	4	7	0	1	0	4	3	2	2	0.438	0.500	0.563
Elton Chamberlain	5	17	13	3	0	0	0	0	0	1	4	3	0.000	0.235	0.000
Charlie Comiskey	10	42	41	6	11	1	1	0	3	4	1	1	0.268	0.286	0.341
Jim Devlin	1	3	3	0	0	0	0	0	0	0	0	0	0.000	0.000	0.000
Ed Herr	3	11	11	2	1	0	0	0	0	1	0	5	0.091	0.091	0.091
Silver King	5	16	15	1	1	0	0	0	0	0	1	6	0.067	0.125	0.067
Arlie Latham	10	45	40	10	10	0	0	0	3	11	5	6	0.250	0.333	0.250
Harry Lyons	5	18	17	0	2	0	0	0	1	0	1	5	0.118	0.167	0.118
Tommy McCarthy	10	41	41	10	10	1	0	1	9	6	0	0	0.244	0.244	0.341
Jocko Milligan	8	28	25	5	10	2	1	0	4	0	3	3	0.400	0.464	0.560
Tip O'Neill	10	43	37	8	9	1	0	2	11	0	6	3	0.243	0.349	0.432
Yank Robinson	10	42	36	7	9	2	1	0	7	2	6	12	0.250	0.357	0.361
Bill White	10	38	35	4	5	1	0	0	4	1	3	6	0.143	0.211	0.171
Team totals	10	362	330	60	75	8	4	3	46	29	32	52	0.227	0.296	0

==== Pitching ====
Player	G	W – L	SV	GS	CG	SHO	IP	H	HR	BB	SO	R	ER	ERA
Elton Chamberlain	5	2–3	0	5	5	1	44.0	52	3	16	13	36	26	5.32
Jim Devlin	1	1–0	0	0	0	0	7.0	5	0	2	5	3	2	2.57
Silver King	5	1–3	0	5	4	0	35.0	37	0	9	12	23	9	2.31
Team totals	10	4–6	0	10	9	1	86.0	94	3	27	30	62	37	3.87

== Series summary ==
Game	Score	Date	Ballpark, City	Attendance
1	Browns 1 – 2 Giants	October 16	Polo Grounds, New York City	4,876
2	Browns 3 – 0 Giants	October 17	Polo Grounds, New York City	5,575
3	Browns 2 – 4 Giants	October 18	Polo Grounds, New York City	5,780
4	Giants 6 – 3 Browns	October 19	Washington Park, Brooklyn, New York	3,062
5	Browns 4 – 6 Giants (8 innings)	October 20	Polo Grounds, New York City	9,124
6	Giants 12 – 5 Browns (8 innings)	October 22	Philadelphia Baseball Grounds, Philadelphia	3,281
7	Giants 5 – 7 Browns (8 innings)	October 24	Sportsman's Park, St. Louis, Missouri	4,624
8	Giants 11 – 3 Browns	October 25	Sportsman's Park, St. Louis, Missouri	4,865
9	Giants 11 – 14 Browns	October 26	Sportsman's Park, St. Louis, Missouri	711
10	Giants 7 – 18 Browns	October 27	Sportsman's Park, St. Louis, Missouri	412
