= 1888 Washington Nationals season =

1888 Washington Nationals
- League: National League
- Ballpark: Swampdoodle Grounds
- City: Washington, D.C.
- Record: 48–86 (.358)
- League place: 8th
- Managers: Walter Hewett, Ted Sullivan

The 1888 Washington Nationals finished with a 48–86 record in the National League, finishing in last place.

== Regular season ==
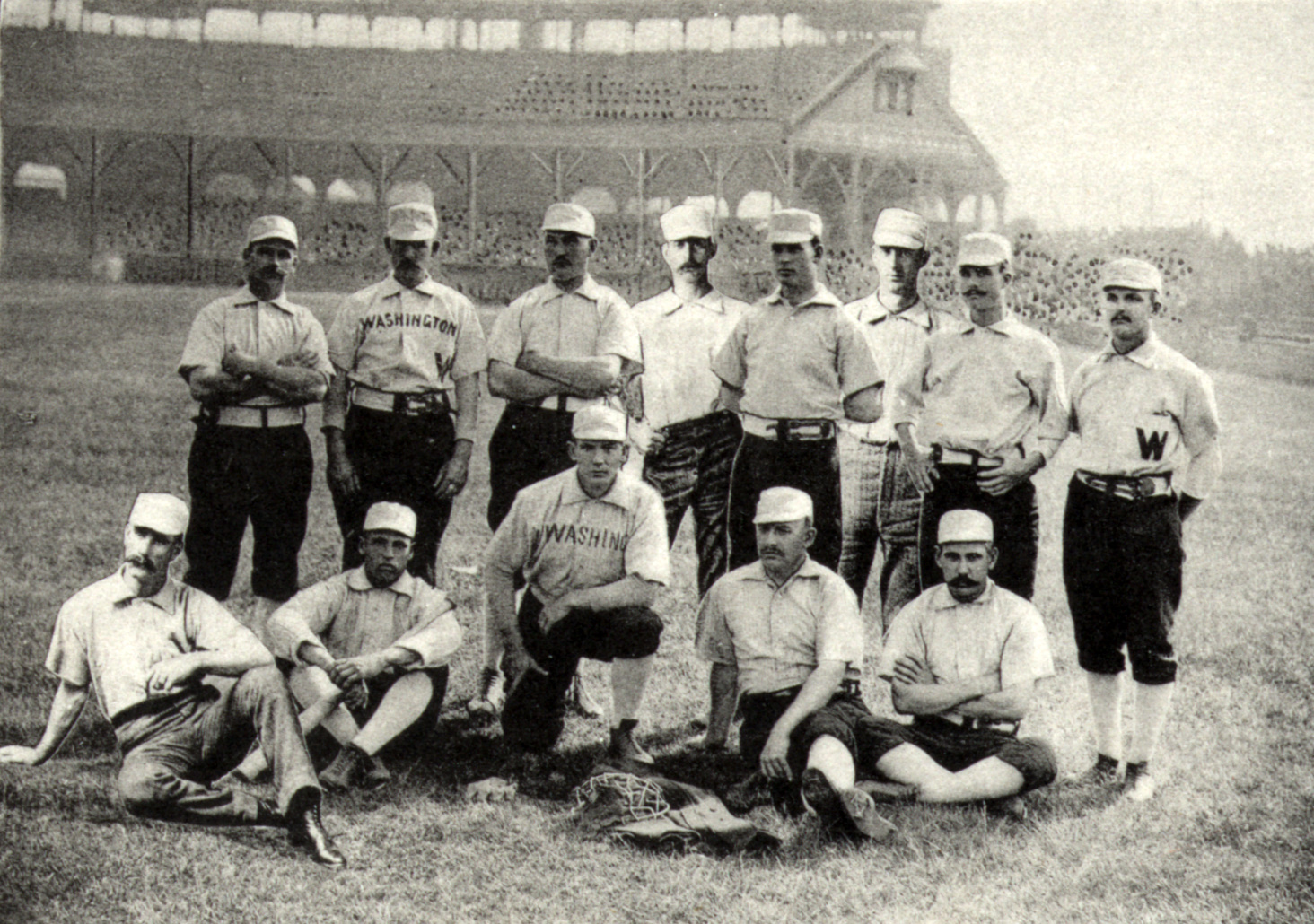

=== Season standings ===
National League
Team	W	L	Pct.	GB	Home	Road
New York Giants	84	47	.641	—	44‍–‍23	40‍–‍24
Chicago White Stockings	77	58	.570	9	43‍–‍27	34‍–‍31
Philadelphia Quakers	69	61	.531	14½	37‍–‍29	32‍–‍32
Boston Beaneaters	70	64	.522	15½	36‍–‍30	34‍–‍34
Detroit Wolverines	68	63	.519	16	40‍–‍26	28‍–‍37
Pittsburgh Alleghenys	66	68	.493	19½	37‍–‍30	29‍–‍38
Indianapolis Hoosiers	50	85	.370	36	31‍–‍35	19‍–‍50
Washington Nationals	48	86	.358	37½	26‍–‍38	22‍–‍48

=== Record vs. opponents ===
1888 National League record Sources:
Team	BSN	CHI	DET	IND	NYG	PHI	PIT	WAS
Boston	—	7–12	10–8–1	11–9	8–12	9–10	10–8–2	15–5
Chicago	12–7	—	10–10	14–6	11–8–1	8–10	9–11	13–6
Detroit	8–10–1	10–10	—	11–8	7–11–2	11–7	10–10	11–7
Indianapolis	9–11	6–14	8–11	—	5–14	4–13	6–14	12–8–1
New York	12–8	8–11–1	11–7–2	14–5	—	14–5–1	10–7–2	15–4–1
Philadelphia	10–9	10–8	7–11	13–4	5–14–1	—	14–6–1	10–9
Pittsburgh	8–10–2	11–9	10–10	14–6	7–10–2	6–14–1	—	10–9
Washington	5–15	6–13	7–11	8–12–1	4–15–1	9–10	9–10	—

=== Roster ===
1888 Washington Nationals
Roster
Pitchers: Frank Gilmore; John Greenig; George Haddock; George Keefe; Hank O'Day; Dupee Shaw; Jim Whitney; Wild Bill Widner	Catchers: Tug Arundel; Jim Banning; Pat Deasley; Connie Mack; Miah Murray; Infielders: Jim Donnelly; Shorty Fuller; Gid Gardner; John Irwin; Al Myers; Billy O'Brien; George Shoch; Pete Sweeney	Outfielders: Ed Daily; Dummy Hoy; Perry Werden; Walt Wilmot	Manager: Walter Hewett; Ted Sullivan

== Player stats ==
=== Batting ===
==== Starters by position ====
Note: Pos = Position; G = Games played; AB = At bats; H = Hits; Avg. = Batting average; HR = Home runs; RBI = Runs batted in

Pos	Player	G	AB	H	Avg.	HR	RBI
C	Connie Mack	85	300	56	.187	3	29
1B	Billy O'Brien	133	528	119	.225	9	66
2B	Al Myers	132	502	104	.207	2	46
3B	Jim Donnelly	122	428	86	.201	0	23
SS	George Shoch	90	317	58	.183	2	24
OF	Walt Wilmot	119	473	106	.224	4	43
OF	Dummy Hoy	136	503	138	.274	2	29
OF	Ed Daily	110	453	102	.225	7	39

==== Other batters ====
Note: G = Games played; AB = At bats; H = Hits; Avg. = Batting average; HR = Home runs; RBI = Runs batted in

Player	G	AB	H	Avg.	HR	RBI
Shorty Fuller	49	170	31	.182	0	12
Pat Deasley	34	127	20	.157	0	4
John Irwin	37	126	28	.222	0	8
Tug Arundel	17	51	10	.196	0	3
Pete Sweeney	11	44	8	.182	0	5
Miah Murray	12	42	4	.095	0	3
Perry Werden	3	10	3	.300	0	2
Gid Gardner	2	4	1	.250	0	0
Jim Banning	1	0	0	----	0	0

=== Pitching ===
==== Starting pitchers ====
Note: G = Games pitched; IP = Innings pitched; W = Wins; L = Losses; ERA = Earned run average; SO = Strikeouts

Player	G	IP	W	L	ERA	SO
Hank O'Day	46	403.0	16	29	3.10	186
Jim Whitney	39	325.0	18	21	3.05	79
Wild Bill Widner	13	115.0	5	7	2.82	33
George Keefe	13	114.0	6	7	2.84	52
Frank Gilmore	12	95.2	1	9	6.59	23
Ed Daily	9	73.2	2	7	4.89	20
Dupee Shaw	3	25.0	0	3	6.48	8
George Haddock	2	16.0	0	2	2.25	3
John Greenig	1	9.0	0	1	11.00	2

==== Relief pitchers ====
Note: G = Games pitched; W = Wins; L = Losses; SV = Saves; ERA = Earned run average; SO = Strikeouts

Player	G	W	L	SV	ERA	SO
George Shoch	1	0	0	0	0.00	0
