= 1888 Philadelphia Quakers season =

National League season

1888 Philadelphia Phillies
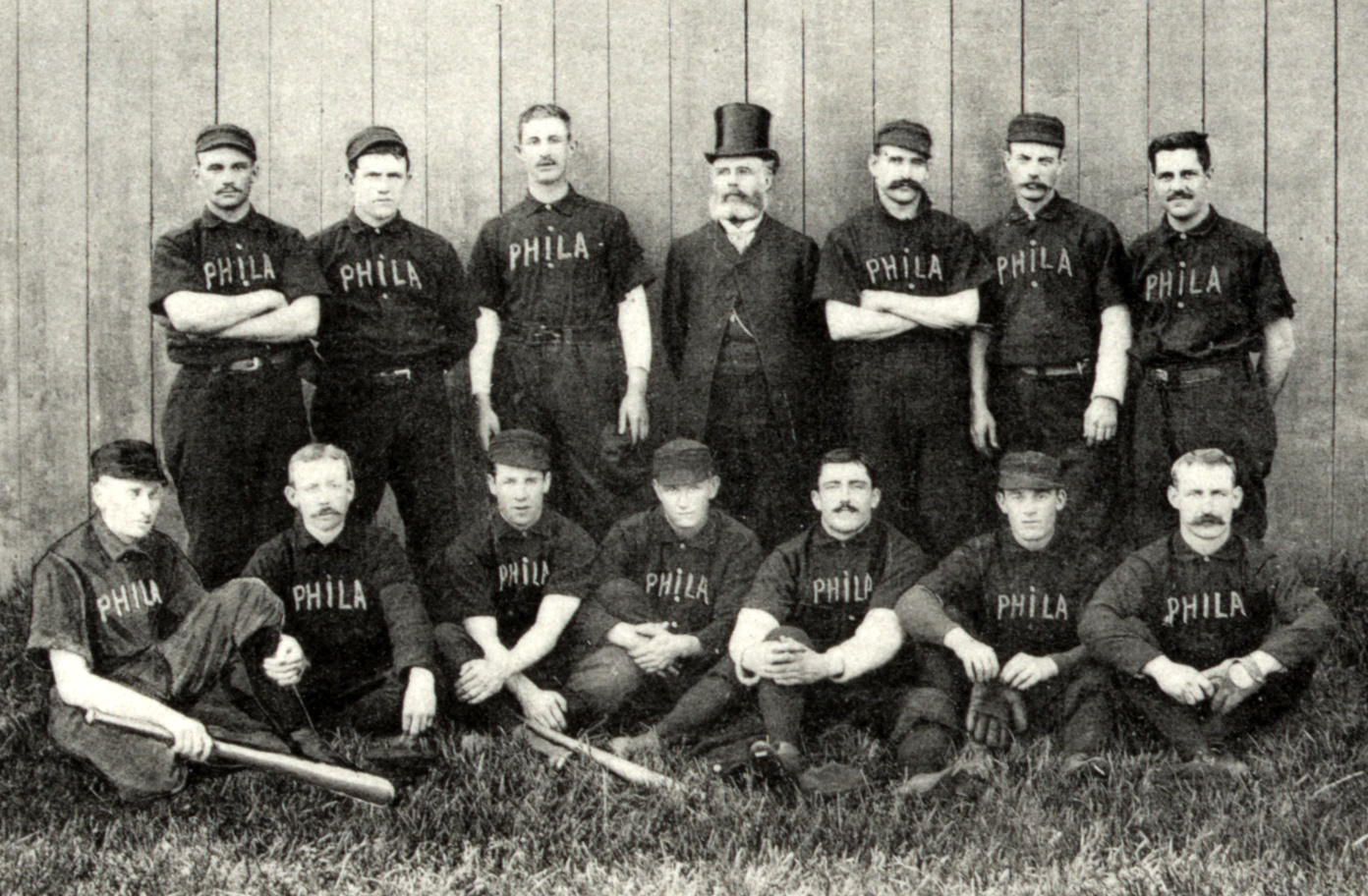
- 1888 Philadelphia Phillies
- League: National League
- Ballpark: Philadelphia Base Ball Grounds
- City: Philadelphia, Pennsylvania, U.S.
- Record: 69–61 (.531)
- League place: 3rd
- Owners: Al Reach, John Rogers
- Manager: Harry Wright

The 1888 Philadelphia Phillies season was the 6th season in the history of the franchise and second season playing home games at National League Park at Broad and Huntingdon Streets.

== Preseason ==
The Phillies held spring training in Cape May, New Jersey from March 19, 1888, to March 30, 1888. The Phillies stayed at the Chalfonte Hotel and practiced and played games games at the Cape May Athletic Park behind the hotel between Sewell and Benton Streets. When rain and snow barred outdoor work, Manager Harry Wright secured the use of the indoor Star Rink where the players practiced.

== Regular season ==
=== Season standings ===
National League
| Team | W | L | Pct. | GB | Home | Road |
|---|---|---|---|---|---|---|
| New York Giants | 84 | 47 | .641 | — | 44‍–‍23 | 40‍–‍24 |
| Chicago White Stockings | 77 | 58 | .570 | 9 | 43‍–‍27 | 34‍–‍31 |
| Philadelphia Quakers | 69 | 61 | .531 | 14½ | 37‍–‍29 | 32‍–‍32 |
| Boston Beaneaters | 70 | 64 | .522 | 15½ | 36‍–‍30 | 34‍–‍34 |
| Detroit Wolverines | 68 | 63 | .519 | 16 | 40‍–‍26 | 28‍–‍37 |
| Pittsburgh Alleghenys | 66 | 68 | .493 | 19½ | 37‍–‍30 | 29‍–‍38 |
| Indianapolis Hoosiers | 50 | 85 | .370 | 36 | 31‍–‍35 | 19‍–‍50 |
| Washington Nationals | 48 | 86 | .358 | 37½ | 26‍–‍38 | 22‍–‍48 |

=== Record vs. opponents ===
1888 National League record Sources:
| Team | BSN | CHI | DET | IND | NYG | PHI | PIT | WAS |
|---|---|---|---|---|---|---|---|---|
| Boston | — | 7–12 | 10–8–1 | 11–9 | 8–12 | 9–10 | 10–8–2 | 15–5 |
| Chicago | 12–7 | — | 10–10 | 14–6 | 11–8–1 | 8–10 | 9–11 | 13–6 |
| Detroit | 8–10–1 | 10–10 | — | 11–8 | 7–11–2 | 11–7 | 10–10 | 11–7 |
| Indianapolis | 9–11 | 6–14 | 8–11 | — | 5–14 | 4–13 | 6–14 | 12–8–1 |
| New York | 12–8 | 8–11–1 | 11–7–2 | 14–5 | — | 14–5–1 | 10–7–2 | 15–4–1 |
| Philadelphia | 10–9 | 10–8 | 7–11 | 13–4 | 5–14–1 | — | 14–6–1 | 10–9 |
| Pittsburgh | 8–10–2 | 11–9 | 10–10 | 14–6 | 7–10–2 | 6–14–1 | — | 10–9 |
| Washington | 5–15 | 6–13 | 7–11 | 8–12–1 | 4–15–1 | 9–10 | 9–10 | — |

=== Roster ===
1888 Philadelphia Quakers
Roster
| Pitchers: Charlie Buffinton; Dan Casey; Kid Gleason; Ben Sanders; Jim Tyng; Catchers: Jack Clements; Bill Hallman; Deacon McGuire; Pop Schriver | Infielders: Charlie Bastian; Cupid Childs; Ed Delahanty; Sid Farrar; Gid Gardner; Arthur Irwin; Joe Mulvey; Woody Wagenhorst | Outfielders: Ed Andrews; Jim Fogarty; John Grim; George Wood | Manager: Harry Wright |

== Player stats ==
=== Batting ===
==== Starters by position ====
Note: Pos = Position; G = Games played; AB = At bats; H = Hits; Avg. = Batting average; HR = Home runs; RBI = Runs batted in

| Pos | Player | G | AB | H | Avg. | HR | RBI |
|---|---|---|---|---|---|---|---|
| C | Jack Clements | 86 | 326 | 80 | .245 | 1 | 32 |
| 1B | Sid Farrar | 131 | 508 | 124 | .244 | 1 | 53 |
| 2B | Charlie Bastian | 80 | 275 | 53 | .193 | 1 | 17 |
| SS | Arthur Irwin | 125 | 448 | 98 | .219 | 0 | 28 |
| 3B | Joe Mulvey | 100 | 398 | 86 | .216 | 0 | 39 |
| OF | Jim Fogarty | 121 | 454 | 107 | .236 | 1 | 35 |
| OF | Ed Andrews | 124 | 528 | 126 | .239 | 3 | 44 |
| OF | George Wood | 106 | 433 | 99 | .229 | 6 | 51 |

==== Other batters ====
Note: G = Games played; AB = At bats; H = Hits; Avg. = Batting average; HR = Home runs; RBI = Runs batted in

| Player | G | AB | H | Avg. | HR | RBI |
|---|---|---|---|---|---|---|
| Ed Delahanty | 74 | 290 | 66 | .228 | 1 | 31 |
| Pop Schriver | 40 | 134 | 26 | .194 | 1 | 23 |
| Bill Hallman | 18 | 63 | 13 | .206 | 0 | 6 |
| Deacon McGuire | 12 | 51 | 17 | .333 | 0 | 11 |
| Woody Wagenhurst | 2 | 8 | 1 | .125 | 0 | 0 |
| John Grim | 2 | 7 | 1 | .143 | 0 | 0 |
| Cupid Childs | 2 | 4 | 0 | .000 | 0 | 0 |
| Gid Gardner | 1 | 3 | 2 | .667 | 0 | 1 |

=== Pitching ===
==== Starting pitchers ====
Note: G = Games pitched; IP = Innings pitched; W = Wins; L = Losses; ERA = Earned run average; SO = Strikeouts

| Player | G | IP | W | L | ERA | SO |
|---|---|---|---|---|---|---|
| Charlie Buffinton | 46 | 400.1 | 28 | 17 | 1.91 | 199 |
| Dan Casey | 33 | 285.2 | 14 | 18 | 3.15 | 108 |
| Ben Sanders | 31 | 275.1 | 19 | 10 | 1.90 | 121 |
| Kid Gleason | 24 | 199.2 | 7 | 16 | 2.84 | 89 |

==== Relief pitchers ====
Note: G = Games pitched; W = Wins; L = Losses; SV = Saves; ERA = Earned run average; SO = Strikeouts

| Player | G | W | L | SV | ERA | SO |
|---|---|---|---|---|---|---|
| George Wood | 2 | 0 | 0 | 2 | 4.50 | 0 |
