= 1888 Major League Baseball season =

1888 MLB season
- League: American Association (AA); National League (NL)
- Sport: Baseball
- Duration: Regular season: April 18 – October 17, 1888 (AA); April 20 – October 13, 1888 (NL); World's Championship Series: October 16–27, 1888
- Games: 140
- Teams: 16 (8 per league)

Pennant winner
- AA champions: St. Louis Browns
- AA runners-up: Brooklyn Bridegrooms
- NL champions: New York Giants
- NL runners-up: Chicago White Stockings

World's Championship Series
- Venue: Polo Grounds, New York, New York; Sportsman's Park, St. Louis, Missouri
- Champions: New York Giants
- Runners-up: St. Louis Browns

MLB seasons
- ← 1887 1889 →

Locations of teams for the 1888 American Association season
American Association
Locations of teams for the 1888 National League season
National League

The 1888 major league baseball season began on April 18, 1888. The regular season ended on October 17, with the New York Giants and the St. Louis Browns as regular season champions of the National League and American Association, respectively. The postseason began with Game 1 of the fifth World's Championship Series on October 16 and ended with Game 10 on October 27, in what was a best-of-eleven-playoff. The Giants defeated the Browns, six games to four, capturing their first World's Championship Series.

Over the offseason, the American Association's New York Metropolitans folded, and saw them replaced by the newly enfranchised Kansas City Cowboys. Meanwhile, the Brooklyn Grays renamed as the Brooklyn Bridegrooms.

== Schedule ==
The 1888 schedule consisted of 140 games for all teams in the American Association and National League, each of which had eight teams. Each team was scheduled to play 20 games against the other seven teams of their respective league. This continued the format put in place by the American Association since the 1886 season and was the first season that the National League adopted the format. This format would last until 1892.

American Association Opening Day took place on April 18 featuring all eight teams, while National League Opening Day took place on April 20, also featuring all eight teams. The American Association would see its final day of the regular season on October 15 with a game between the Cleveland Blues and Philadelphia Athletics, while the National League would see its final day of the season on October 13, featuring all eight teams. The 1888 World's Championship Series took place between October 16 and October 27.

== Rule changes ==
The 1888 season saw the following rule changes:

- A batter was credited with a base hit when a runner was hit by his batted ball.
- A batter was credited with a hit when a runner is out for being hit by the batted ball.
- The base on balls exemption from a time at bat was restored.
- Rule 50 § 4 was amended allowing a runner to take a base if the ball hits the umpire, while a struck ball hits a base runner after an attempt has been made to field it, the runner shall not be declared out.
- Rules distinguishing earned runs from unearned runs were created, mainly that an earned run was defined as one unaided by errors, with an exception for bases on balls; a player that was walked and scores will be counted towards a pitcher's total earned runs.
- Rule 4 changed, changing the total number of strikes needed for a strikeout were reduced from four to three (as they were, prior to 1887.
- The 1887 batting average rule which included balls in the calculation of the batting average is reversed.

== Teams ==
An asterisk (*) denotes the ballpark a team played the minority of their home games at

League	Team	City	Ballpark	Capacity	Manager
American Association	Baltimore Orioles	Baltimore, Maryland	Oriole Park	5,000	Billy Barnie
American Association	Brooklyn Bridegrooms	Brooklyn, New York	Washington Park	3,000	Bill McGunnigle
American Association	Cincinnati Red Stockings	Cincinnati, Ohio	American Park	3,000	Gus Schmelz
American Association	Cleveland Blues	Cleveland, Ohio	National League Park	Unknown	Jimmy Williams
American Association	Cleveland Blues	Cleveland, Ohio	National League Park	Unknown	Tom Loftus
American Association	Kansas City Cowboys	Kansas City, Missouri	Association Park	Unknown	Dave Rowe
American Association	Kansas City Cowboys	Kansas City, Missouri	Association Park	Unknown	Sam Barkley
American Association	Kansas City Cowboys	Kansas City, Missouri	Association Park	Unknown	Bill Watkins
American Association	Kansas City Cowboys	Kansas City, Missouri	Exposition Park*	4,000*	Bill Watkins
American Association	Louisville Colonels	Louisville, Kentucky	Eclipse Park	5,860	Kick Kelly
American Association	Louisville Colonels	Louisville, Kentucky	Eclipse Park	5,860	Mordecai Davidson
American Association	Louisville Colonels	Louisville, Kentucky	Eclipse Park	5,860	Jack Kerins
American Association	Philadelphia Athletics	Philadelphia, Pennsylvania	Jefferson Street Grounds	15,000	Bill Sharsig
American Association	St. Louis Browns	St. Louis, Missouri	Sportsman's Park	12,000	Charles Comiskey
National League	Boston Beaneaters	Boston, Massachusetts	South End Grounds	6,800	John Morrill
National League	Chicago White Stockings	Chicago, Illinois	West Side Park	6,000	Cap Anson
National League	Detroit Wolverines	Detroit, Michigan	Recreation Park (Detroit)	Unknown	Bill Watkins
National League	Detroit Wolverines	Detroit, Michigan	Recreation Park (Detroit)	Unknown	Robert Leadley
National League	Indianapolis Hoosiers	Indianapolis, Indiana	Seventh Street Park	Unknown	Harry Spence
National League	New York Giants	New York, New York	Polo Grounds	20,709	Jim Mutrie
National League	Philadelphia Quakers	Philadelphia, Pennsylvania	Philadelphia Base Ball Grounds	12,500	Harry Wright
National League	Pittsburgh Alleghenys	Allegheny, Pennsylvania	Recreation Park (Pittsburgh)	17,000	Horace Phillips
National League	Washington Nationals	Washington, D.C.	Swampoodle Grounds	6,000	Walter Hewett
National League	Washington Nationals	Washington, D.C.	Swampoodle Grounds	6,000	Ted Sullivan

=== Sunday games ===
Blue laws restricted Sunday activities in several localities, causing several teams of the American Association (which was informally referred to as the "Beer & Whiskey League" due to its openness on alcohol, compared to the National League) to play at ballparks in a different locality.

Team	City	Ballpark	Capacity	Games played
Brooklyn Bridegrooms	Ridgewood, New York	Ridgewood Park	10,000	20
Cleveland Blues	Bainbridge Township, Ohio	Geauga Lake Grounds	Unknown	3
Cleveland Blues	Newburgh Township, Ohio	Beyerle's Park	Unknown	1
Philadelphia Athletics	Gloucester City, New Jersey	Fireworks Park	Unknown	2
Philadelphia Athletics	Gloucester City, New Jersey	Gloucester Point Grounds	Unknown	1

1. In today's New York, New York.
2. In today's Pittsburgh, Pennsylvania.
3. In today's Cleveland, Ohio.

== Standings ==
=== American Association ===
American Association
Team	W	L	Pct.	GB	Home	Road
St. Louis Browns	92	43	.681	—	60‍–‍21	32‍–‍22
Brooklyn Bridegrooms	88	52	.629	6½	53‍–‍20	35‍–‍32
Philadelphia Athletics	81	52	.609	10	55‍–‍20	26‍–‍32
Cincinnati Red Stockings	80	54	.597	11½	56‍–‍25	24‍–‍29
Baltimore Orioles	57	80	.416	36	30‍–‍26	27‍–‍54
Cleveland Blues	50	82	.379	40½	33‍–‍27	17‍–‍55
Louisville Colonels	48	87	.356	44	27‍–‍29	21‍–‍58
Kansas City Cowboys	43	89	.326	47½	23‍–‍34	20‍–‍55

=== National League ===
National League
Team	W	L	Pct.	GB	Home	Road
New York Giants	84	47	.641	—	44‍–‍23	40‍–‍24
Chicago White Stockings	77	58	.570	9	43‍–‍27	34‍–‍31
Philadelphia Quakers	69	61	.531	14½	37‍–‍29	32‍–‍32
Boston Beaneaters	70	64	.522	15½	36‍–‍30	34‍–‍34
Detroit Wolverines	68	63	.519	16	40‍–‍26	28‍–‍37
Pittsburgh Alleghenys	66	68	.493	19½	37‍–‍30	29‍–‍38
Indianapolis Hoosiers	50	85	.370	36	31‍–‍35	19‍–‍50
Washington Nationals	48	86	.358	37½	26‍–‍38	22‍–‍48

=== Tie games ===
21 tie games (9 in AA, 12 in NL), which are not factored into winning percentage or games behind (and were often replayed again), occurred throughout the season.

==== American Association ====
- Brooklyn Bridegrooms, 3
- Cincinnati Red Stockings, 3
- Cleveland Blues, 3
- Louisville Colonels, 4
- Philadelphia Athletics, 3
- St. Louis Browns, 2

==== National League ====
- Boston Beaneaters, 3
- Chicago White Stockings, 1
- Detroit Wolverines, 3
- Indianapolis Hoosiers, 1
- New York Giants, 7
- Philadelphia Quakers, 2
- Pittsburgh Alleghenys, 5
- Washington Nationals, 2

== Postseason ==
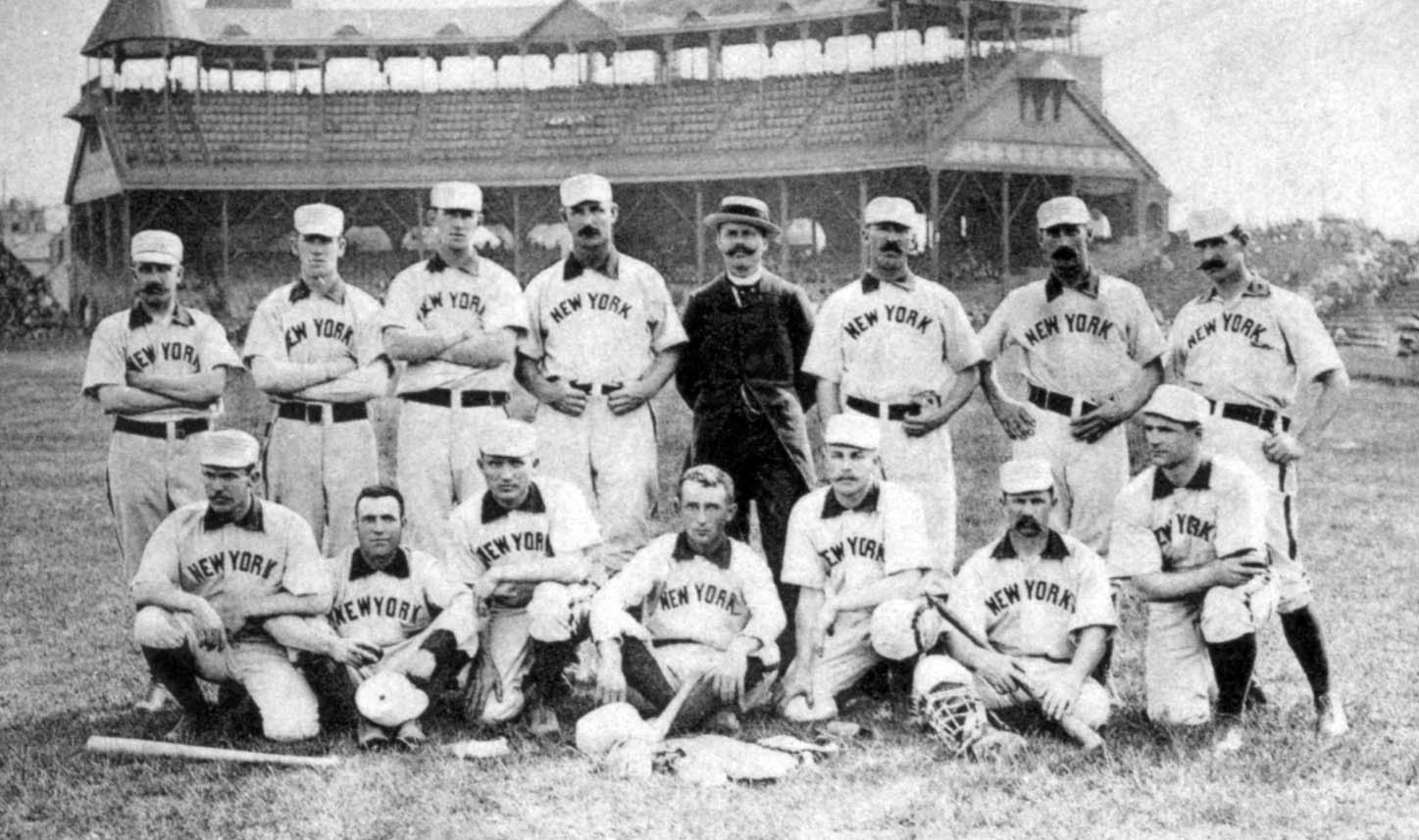
New York Giants baseball team, 1888

=== Bracket ===
World's Championship Series
AA	St. Louis Browns	1	3	2	3	4	5	7^{8}	3	14	18
NL	New York Giants	2	0	4	6	6^{8}	12^{8}	5	11	11	7

== Managerial changes ==
=== Off-season ===
Team	Former Manager	New Manager
Brooklyn Bridegrooms	Charlie Byrne	Bill McGunnigle
Indianapolis Hoosiers	Horace Fogel	Harry Spence
New York Metropolitans	Ollie Caylor	Team folded
Philadelphia Athletics	Charlie Mason	Bill Sharsig
Washington Nationals	John Gaffney	Walter Hewett

=== In-season ===
Team	Former Manager	New Manager
Cleveland Blues	Jimmy Williams	Tom Loftus
Detroit Wolverines	Bill Watkins	Robert Leadley
Kansas City Cowboys	Dave Rowe	Sam Barkley
Kansas City Cowboys	Sam Barkley	Bill Watkins
Louisville Colonels	Kick Kelly	Mordecai Davidson
Louisville Colonels	Mordecai Davidson	John Kerins
Washington Statesmen	Walter Hewett	Ted Sullivan

== League leaders ==
Any team shown in small text indicates a previous team a player was on during the season.

=== American Association ===
Hitting leaders
Stat	Player	Total
AVG	Tip O'Neill (STL)	.335
OPS	John Reilly (CIN)	.864
HR	John Reilly (CIN)	13
RBI	John Reilly (CIN)	103
R	George Pinkney (BRO)	134
H	Tip O'Neill (STL)	177
SB	Arlie Latham (STL)	109

Pitching leaders
Stat	Player	Total
W	Silver King (STL)	45
L	Henry Porter (KC)	37
ERA	Silver King (STL)	1.63
K	Ed Seward (PHA)	272
IP	Silver King (STL)	584.2
SV	John Corkhill (BRO/CIN); Bob Gilks (CLE); Tony Mullane (CIN)	1
WHIP	Silver King (STL)	0.874

=== National League ===
Hitting leaders
Stat	Player	Total
AVG	Cap Anson (CHI)	.344
OPS	Cap Anson (CHI)	.899
HR	Jimmy Ryan (CHI)	16
RBI	Cap Anson (CHI)	84
R	Dan Brouthers (DET)	118
H	Jimmy Ryan (CHI)	182
SB	Billy Hoy (WAS)	82

Pitching leaders
Stat	Player	Total
W	Tim Keefe^{1} (NYG)	35
L	Hank O'Day (WAS)	29
ERA	Tim Keefe^{1} (NYG)	1.74
K	Tim Keefe^{1} (NYG)	335
IP	John Clarkson (BSN)	483.1
SV	George Wood (PHI)	2
WHIP	Tim Keefe (NYG)	0.937

^{1} National League Triple Crown pitching winner

== Milestones ==
=== Batters ===
==== Cycles ====
- Harry Stovey (PHA):
  - Stovey hit for his first cycle and fourth in franchise history, on May 15 against the Baltimore Orioles.
- Sam Barkley (KC):
  - Barkley hit for his first cycle and first in franchise history, on June 13 against the Cincinnati Red Stockings.
- Jimmy Ryan (CHI):
  - Ryan hit for his first cycle and first in franchise history, on July 28 against the Detroit Wolverines.
- Mike Tiernan (NYG):
  - Tiernan hit for his first cycle and first in franchise history, on August 25 against the Philadelphia Quakers.

=== Pitchers ===
==== No-hitters ====
- Adonis Terry (BRO):
  - Terry threw his second career no-hitter and third no-hitter in franchise history, by defeating the Louisville Colonels 4–0 on May 27. Terry walked three and struck out eight.
- Henry Porter (KC):
  - Porter threw his first career no-hitter and first no-hitter in franchise history, by defeating the Baltimore Orioles 4–0 on June 6. Porter walked one and struck out an unknown amount.
- Ed Seward (PHA):
  - Seward threw his first career no-hitter and third no-hitter in franchise history, by defeating the Cincinnati Red Stockings 12–2 on July 26. Seward walked three and struck out six.
- Gus Weyhing (PHA):
  - Weyhing threw his first career no-hitter and fourth no-hitter in franchise history, by defeating the Kansas City Cowboys 4–0 on July 31. Weyhing walked one, hit one by pitch, and stuck out five.

==== Other pitching accomplishments ====
- Tim Keefe (NYG):
  - Set a Major League record for most consecutive wins in a single season, at 19. The streak ran from June 23 to August 10.
- Ed Morris (PIT):
  - Set a Major League record for most consecutive shutouts, setting a National League record at four on September 15.
- Pud Galvin (PIT):
  - Became the first member of the 300-win club, defeating the Washington Nationals on October 5, winning 5–1.

== Venues ==
The Kansas City Cowboys join the American Association and play at Association Park in Kansas City, Missouri. For the last home game of the season, they permanently left Association Park and move into Exposition Park on September 30.

The New York Giants would play their final game at the original Polo Grounds in game 5 of the World's Championship Series on October 20 against the St. Louis Browns, playing at Oakland Park in Jersey City, New Jersey, St. George Cricket Grounds in St. George, New York, and the second Polo Grounds further uptown the following season.

The South End Grounds, home of the Boston Beaneaters, saw a completely new structure over the offseason. The team would play their first game at the revamped South End Grounds on May 25.

Three teams of the American Association hosted Sunday games:

- Brooklyn Bridegrooms played 20 games at Ridgewood Park in Ridgewood, New York on April 22, 29, May 6, 13, 20, 27, June 3, 10, 17, 24, July 22, 29, August 5, 26, September 2, a doubleheader on September 9, September 16, October 7 and 14. It would be the second of three seasons that the team played Sunday games there.
- Cleveland Blues: played three games at Geauga Lake Grounds in Bainbridge Township, Ohio on July 22, 29 and August 26, as well as one game at Beyerle's Park in Newburgh Township, Ohio on September 2.
- Philadelphia Athletics played two games at Fireworks Park in Gloucester City, New Jersey on August 5 and 26, as well as one game at Gloucester Point Grounds, also in Gloucester City on October 14.

== See also ==
- 1888 in baseball (Events, Births, Deaths)
