= 1888 Pittsburgh Alleghenys season =

1888 Pittsburgh Alleghenys
- League: National League
- Ballpark: Recreation Park
- City: Allegheny, Pennsylvania
- Record: 66–68 (.493)
- League place: 6th
- Owner: William A. Nimick
- Manager: Horace B. Phillips

The 1888 Pittsburgh Alleghenys season was the seventh season of the Pittsburgh Alleghenys franchise and their second in the National League. The Alleghenys finished sixth in the league standings with a record of 66–68.

== Regular season ==
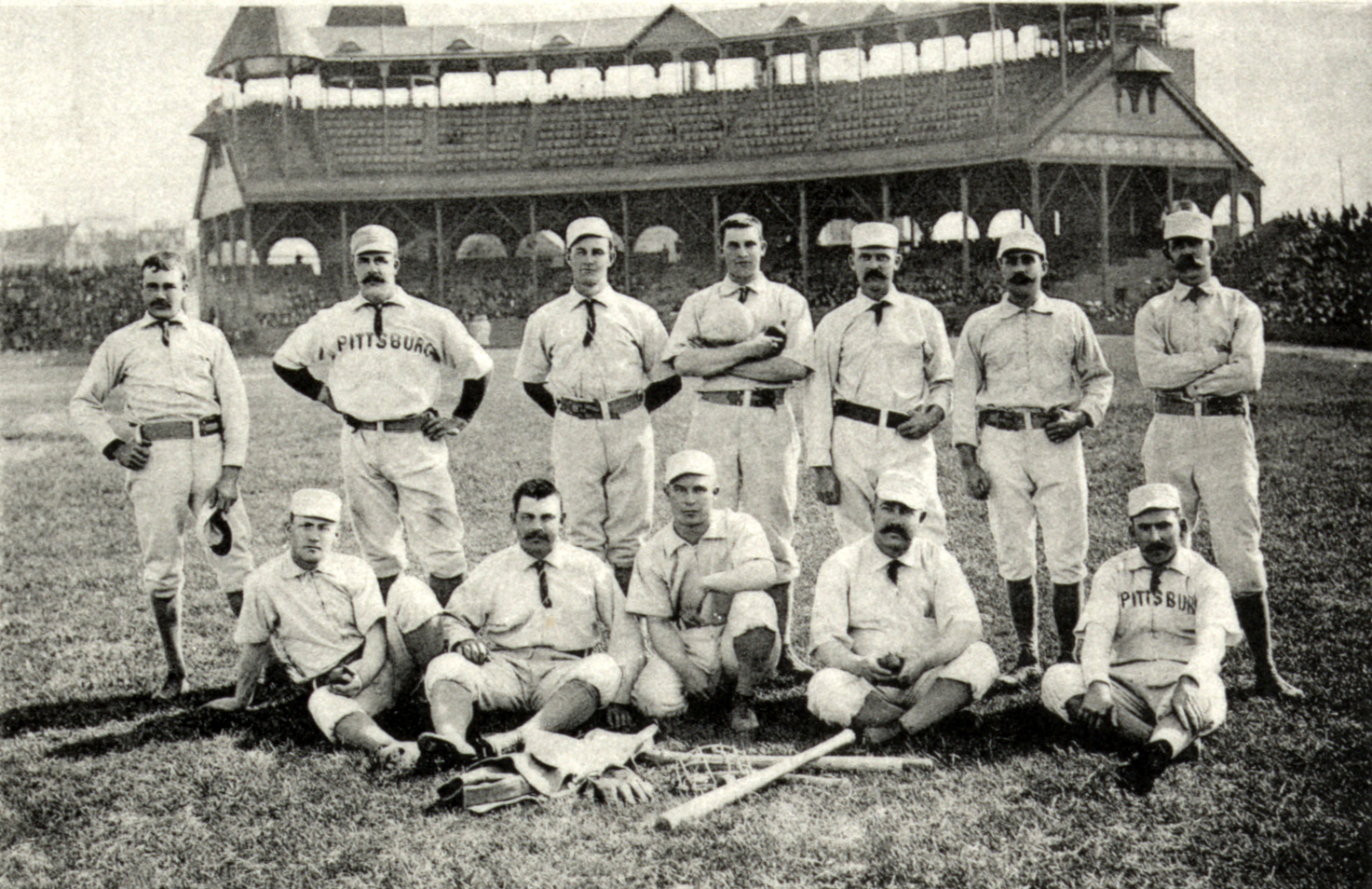

=== Season standings ===
National League
Team	W	L	Pct.	GB	Home	Road
New York Giants	84	47	.641	—	44‍–‍23	40‍–‍24
Chicago White Stockings	77	58	.570	9	43‍–‍27	34‍–‍31
Philadelphia Quakers	69	61	.531	14½	37‍–‍29	32‍–‍32
Boston Beaneaters	70	64	.522	15½	36‍–‍30	34‍–‍34
Detroit Wolverines	68	63	.519	16	40‍–‍26	28‍–‍37
Pittsburgh Alleghenys	66	68	.493	19½	37‍–‍30	29‍–‍38
Indianapolis Hoosiers	50	85	.370	36	31‍–‍35	19‍–‍50
Washington Nationals	48	86	.358	37½	26‍–‍38	22‍–‍48

=== Record vs. opponents ===
1888 National League record Sources:
Team	BSN	CHI	DET	IND	NYG	PHI	PIT	WAS
Boston	—	7–12	10–8–1	11–9	8–12	9–10	10–8–2	15–5
Chicago	12–7	—	10–10	14–6	11–8–1	8–10	9–11	13–6
Detroit	8–10–1	10–10	—	11–8	7–11–2	11–7	10–10	11–7
Indianapolis	9–11	6–14	8–11	—	5–14	4–13	6–14	12–8–1
New York	12–8	8–11–1	11–7–2	14–5	—	14–5–1	10–7–2	15–4–1
Philadelphia	10–9	10–8	7–11	13–4	5–14–1	—	14–6–1	10–9
Pittsburgh	8–10–2	11–9	10–10	14–6	7–10–2	6–14–1	—	10–9
Washington	5–15	6–13	7–11	8–12–1	4–15–1	9–10	9–10	—

=== Roster ===
1888 Pittsburgh Alleghenys
Roster
Pitchers: Pud Galvin; Hardie Henderson; Phil Knell; Ed Morris; Harry Staley	Catchers: Fred Carroll; Bill Farmer; Doggie Miller; Infielders: Jake Beckley; Elmer Cleveland; Fred Dunlap; Bill Kuehne; Al Maul; Pete McShannic; Pop Smith	Outfielders: Cliff Carroll; John Coleman; Abner Dalrymple; Jocko Fields; Sam Nicholl; Billy Sunday; Henry Yaik	Manager: Horace B. Phillips

== Player stats ==
=== Batting ===
==== Starters by position ====
Note: Pos = Position; G = Games played; AB = At bats; H = Hits; Avg. = Batting average; HR = Home runs; RBI = Runs batted in

Pos	Player	G	AB	H	Avg.	HR	RBI
C	Doggie Miller	103	404	112	.277	0	36
1B	Jake Beckley	71	283	97	.343	0	27
2B	Fred Dunlap	82	321	84	.262	1	36
SS	Pop Smith	131	481	99	.206	4	52
3B	Bill Kuehne	138	524	123	.235	3	62
OF	John Coleman	116	438	101	.231	0	26
OF	Abner Dalrymple	57	227	50	.220	0	14
OF	Billy Sunday	120	505	119	.236	0	15

==== Other batters ====
Note: G = Games played; AB = At bats; H = Hits; Avg. = Batting average; HR = Home runs; RBI = Runs batted in

Player	G	AB	H	Avg.	HR	RBI
Fred Carroll	97	366	91	.249	2	48
Al Maul	74	259	54	.208	0	31
Jocko Fields	45	169	33	.195	1	15
Elmer Cleveland	30	108	24	.222	2	9
Pete McShannic	26	98	19	.194	0	5
Sam Nicholl	8	22	1	.045	0	0
Cliff Carroll	5	20	0	.000	0	0
Henry Yaik	2	6	2	.333	0	1
Bill Farmer	2	4	0	.000	0	0

=== Pitching ===
==== Starting pitchers ====
Note: G = Games pitched; IP = Innings pitched; W = Wins; L = Losses; ERA = Earned run average; SO = Strikeouts

Player	G	IP	W	L	ERA	SO
Ed Morris	55	480.0	29	23	2.31	135
Pud Galvin	50	437.1	23	25	2.63	107
Hardie Henderson	5	35.1	1	3	5.35	9
Phil Knell	3	26.1	1	2	3.76	15

==== Other pitchers ====
Note: G = Games pitched; IP = Innings pitched; W = Wins; L = Losses; ERA = Earned run average; SO = Strikeouts

Player	G	IP	W	L	ERA	SO
Al Maul	3	17.0	0	2	6.35	12
