= 1888 Chicago White Stockings season =

1888 Chicago White Stockings
- League: National League
- Ballpark: West Side Park
- City: Chicago
- Record: 77–58 (.570)
- League place: 2nd
- Owner: Albert Spalding
- Manager: Cap Anson

The 1888 Chicago White Stockings season was the 17th season of the Chicago White Stockings franchise, the 13th in the National League and the fourth at the first West Side Park. The White Stockings finished second in the National League with a record of 77–58, 9 games behind the New York Giants.

== Regular season ==
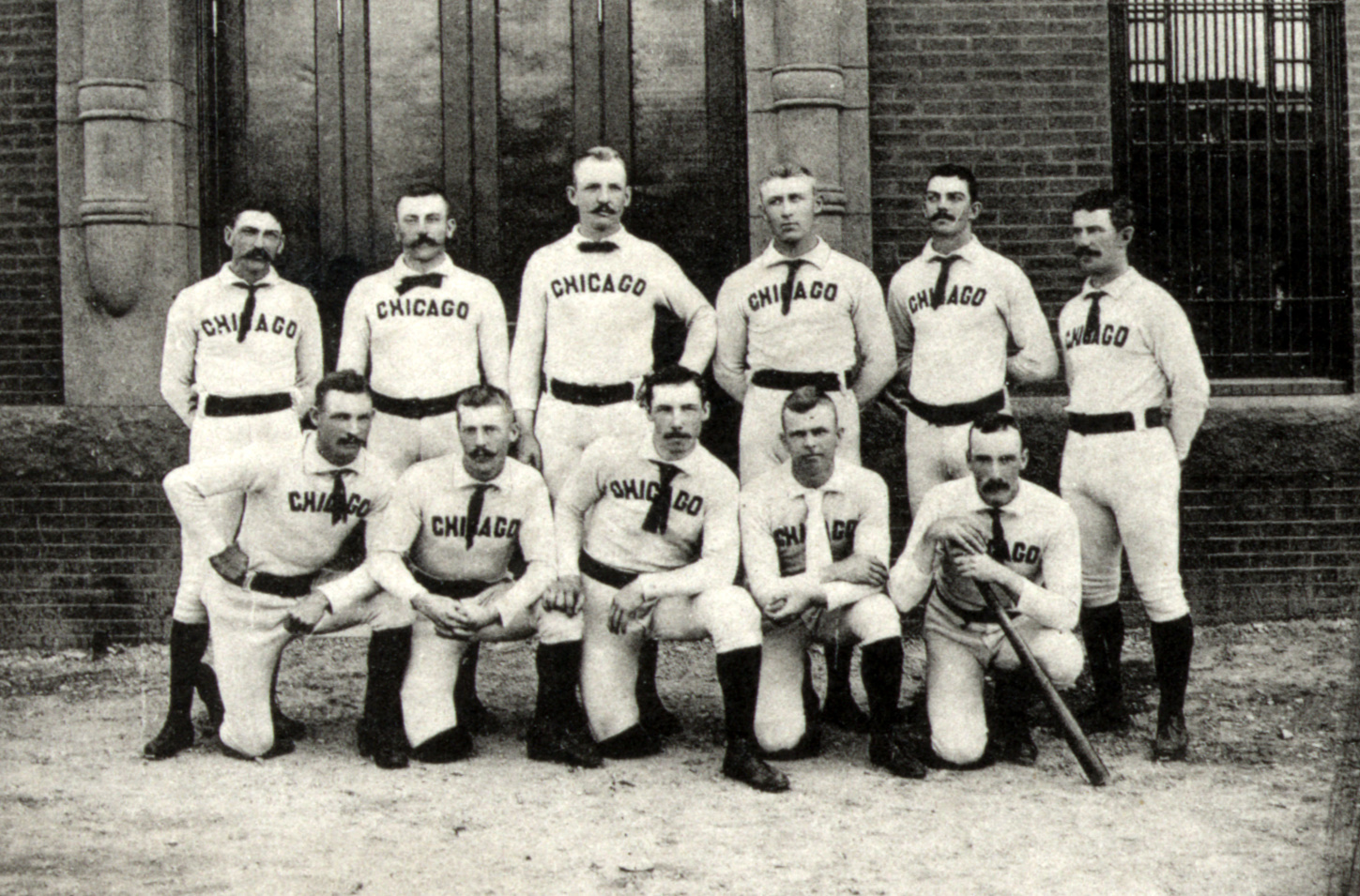

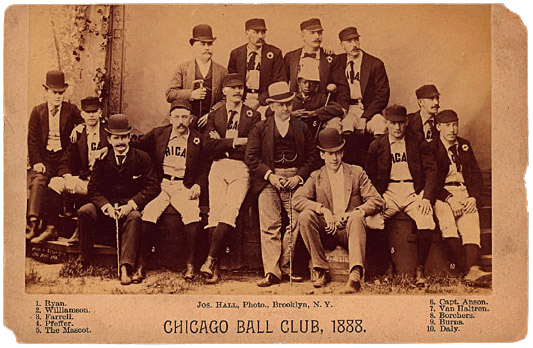
The 1888 Chicago White Stockings – Top Row: ?, Fred Pfeffer, Cap Anson, George Van Haltren. Bottom Row: ?, Jimmy Ryan, Ned Williamson, Duke Farrell, Digby Bell (in white bowler with black band), Clarence Duval (mascot), DeWolf Hopper (in dark bowler), George Borchers, Tom Burns, Tom Daly. DeWolf Hopper is the vaudeville comedian who made "Casey at the Bat" famous, adopting the classic poem as his "signature" piece.

=== Season standings ===
National League
Team	W	L	Pct.	GB	Home	Road
New York Giants	84	47	.641	—	44‍–‍23	40‍–‍24
Chicago White Stockings	77	58	.570	9	43‍–‍27	34‍–‍31
Philadelphia Quakers	69	61	.531	14½	37‍–‍29	32‍–‍32
Boston Beaneaters	70	64	.522	15½	36‍–‍30	34‍–‍34
Detroit Wolverines	68	63	.519	16	40‍–‍26	28‍–‍37
Pittsburgh Alleghenys	66	68	.493	19½	37‍–‍30	29‍–‍38
Indianapolis Hoosiers	50	85	.370	36	31‍–‍35	19‍–‍50
Washington Nationals	48	86	.358	37½	26‍–‍38	22‍–‍48

=== Record vs. opponents ===
1888 National League record Sources:
Team	BSN	CHI	DET	IND	NYG	PHI	PIT	WAS
Boston	—	7–12	10–8–1	11–9	8–12	9–10	10–8–2	15–5
Chicago	12–7	—	10–10	14–6	11–8–1	8–10	9–11	13–6
Detroit	8–10–1	10–10	—	11–8	7–11–2	11–7	10–10	11–7
Indianapolis	9–11	6–14	8–11	—	5–14	4–13	6–14	12–8–1
New York	12–8	8–11–1	11–7–2	14–5	—	14–5–1	10–7–2	15–4–1
Philadelphia	10–9	10–8	7–11	13–4	5–14–1	—	14–6–1	10–9
Pittsburgh	8–10–2	11–9	10–10	14–6	7–10–2	6–14–1	—	10–9
Washington	5–15	6–13	7–11	8–12–1	4–15–1	9–10	9–10	—

== Roster ==
1888 Chicago White Stockings
Roster
Pitchers: Mark Baldwin; George Borchers; Tod Brynan; Dad Clarke; Frank Dwyer; Ad Gumbert; Gus Krock; Willard Mains; John Tener	Catchers: Tom Daly; Dell Darling; Duke Farrell; Silver Flint; Infielders: Cap Anson; Tom Burns; Fred Pfeffer; Ned Williamson	Outfielders: Hugh Duffy; Bob Pettit; Jimmy Ryan; Marty Sullivan; George Van Haltren	Manager: Cap Anson

== Player stats ==
=== Batting ===
==== Starters by position ====
Note: Pos = Position; G = Games played; AB = At bats; H = Hits; Avg. = Batting average; HR = Home runs; RBI = Runs batted in

Pos	Player	G	AB	H	Avg.	HR	RBI
C	Tom Daly	65	219	42	.192	0	29
1B	Cap Anson	134	515	177	.344	12	84
2B	Fred Pfeffer	135	517	129	.250	8	57
SS	Ned Williamson	132	452	113	.250	8	73
3B	Tom Burns	134	483	115	.238	3	70
OF	Hugh Duffy	71	298	84	.282	7	41
OF	Marty Sullivan	75	314	74	.236	7	39
OF	Jimmy Ryan	129	549	182	.332	16	64

==== Other batters ====
Note: G = Games played; AB = At bats; H = Hits; Avg. = Batting average; HR = Home runs; RBI = Runs batted in

Player	G	AB	H	Avg.	HR	RBI
George Van Haltren	81	318	90	.283	4	34
Duke Farrell	64	241	56	.232	3	19
Bob Pettit	43	169	43	.254	4	23
Silver Flint	22	77	14	.182	0	3
Dell Darling	20	75	16	.213	2	7

=== Pitching ===
==== Starting pitchers ====
Note: G = Games pitched; IP = Innings pitched; W = Wins; L = Losses; ERA = Earned run average; SO = Strikeouts

Player	G	IP	W	L	ERA	SO
Gus Krock	39	339.2	25	14	2.44	161
Mark Baldwin	30	251.0	13	15	2.76	157
George Van Haltren	30	245.2	13	13	3.52	139
John Tener	12	102.0	7	5	2.74	39
George Borchers	10	67.0	4	4	3.49	26
Ad Gumbert	6	48.2	3	3	3.14	16
Frank Dwyer	5	42.0	4	1	1.07	17
Tod Brynan	3	25.0	2	1	6.48	11
Dad Clarke	2	16.0	1	0	5.06	6
Willard Mains	2	11.0	1	1	4.91	5

==== Other pitchers ====
Note: G = Games pitched; IP = Innings pitched; W = Wins; L = Losses; ERA = Earned run average; SO = Strikeouts

Player	G	IP	W	L	ERA	SO
Jimmy Ryan	8	38.1	4	0	3.05	11
