= 1888 Indianapolis Hoosiers season =

1888 Indianapolis Hoosiers
- League: National League
- Ballpark: Athletic Park
- City: Indianapolis, Indiana
- Record: 50–85 (.370)
- League place: 7th
- Owner: John T. Brush
- Manager: Harry Spence

The 1888 Indianapolis Hoosiers finished with a 50–85 record in the National League, finishing in seventh place.

== Offseason ==
October 20, 1887: Gid Gardner and cash were traded by the Hoosiers to the Washington Nationals for Paul Hines.

== Regular season ==
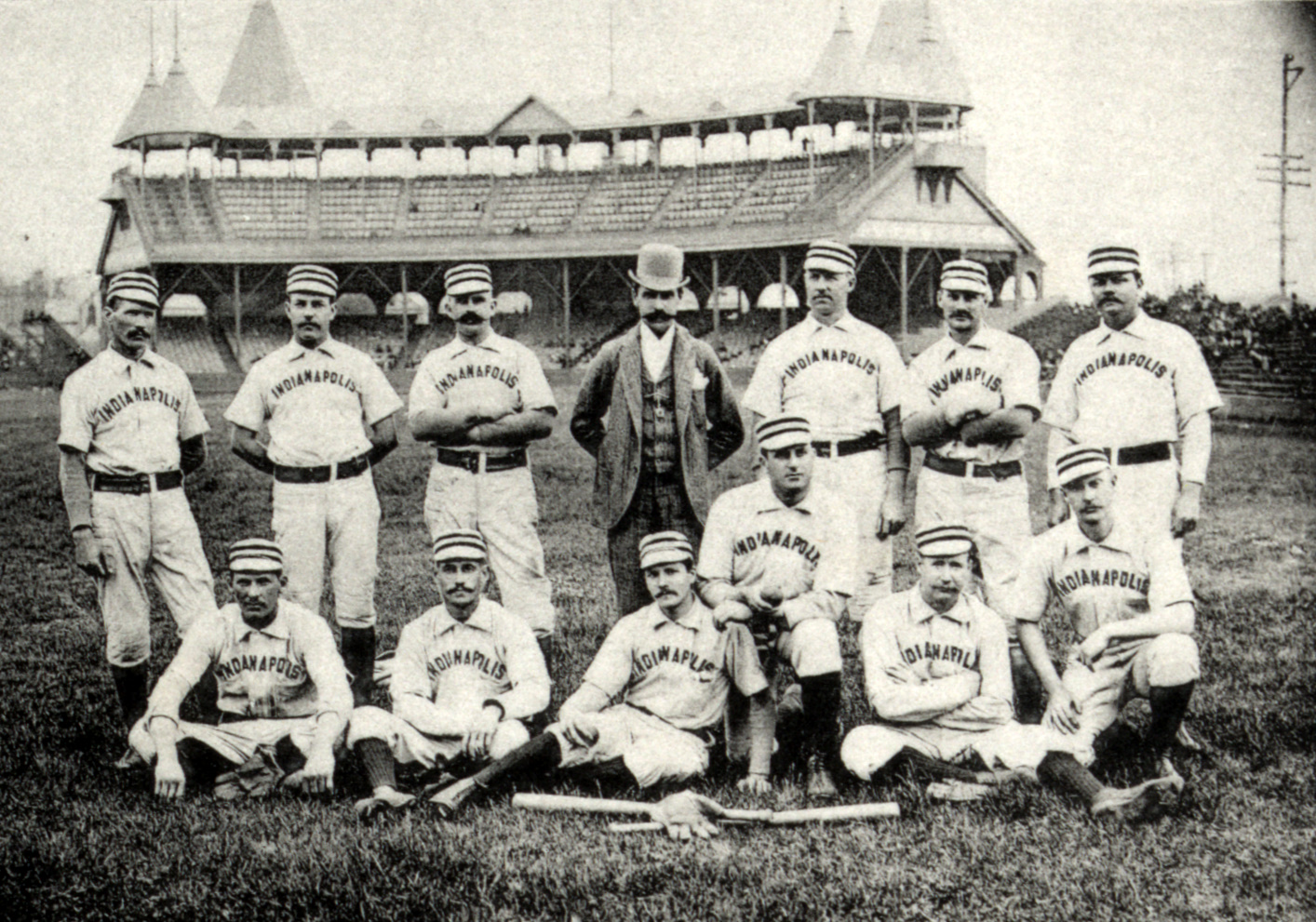

=== Season standings ===
National League
Team	W	L	Pct.	GB	Home	Road
New York Giants	84	47	.641	—	44‍–‍23	40‍–‍24
Chicago White Stockings	77	58	.570	9	43‍–‍27	34‍–‍31
Philadelphia Quakers	69	61	.531	14½	37‍–‍29	32‍–‍32
Boston Beaneaters	70	64	.522	15½	36‍–‍30	34‍–‍34
Detroit Wolverines	68	63	.519	16	40‍–‍26	28‍–‍37
Pittsburgh Alleghenys	66	68	.493	19½	37‍–‍30	29‍–‍38
Indianapolis Hoosiers	50	85	.370	36	31‍–‍35	19‍–‍50
Washington Nationals	48	86	.358	37½	26‍–‍38	22‍–‍48

=== Record vs. opponents ===
1888 National League record Sources:
Team	BSN	CHI	DET	IND	NYG	PHI	PIT	WAS
Boston	—	7–12	10–8–1	11–9	8–12	9–10	10–8–2	15–5
Chicago	12–7	—	10–10	14–6	11–8–1	8–10	9–11	13–6
Detroit	8–10–1	10–10	—	11–8	7–11–2	11–7	10–10	11–7
Indianapolis	9–11	6–14	8–11	—	5–14	4–13	6–14	12–8–1
New York	12–8	8–11–1	11–7–2	14–5	—	14–5–1	10–7–2	15–4–1
Philadelphia	10–9	10–8	7–11	13–4	5–14–1	—	14–6–1	10–9
Pittsburgh	8–10–2	11–9	10–10	14–6	7–10–2	6–14–1	—	10–9
Washington	5–15	6–13	7–11	8–12–1	4–15–1	9–10	9–10	—

=== Roster ===
1888 Indianapolis Hoosiers
Roster
Pitchers: Henry Boyle; Bill Burdick; Egyptian Healy; Sam Moffet; Lev Shreve	Catchers: Dick Buckley; Con Daily; George Myers; Infielders: Charley Bassett; Jerry Denny; Dude Esterbrook; Jack Glasscock; Jumbo Schoeneck	Outfielders: Paul Hines; Jack McGeachey; Otto Schomberg; Emmett Seery	Manager: Harry Spence

== Player stats ==
=== Batting ===
==== Starters by position ====
Note: Pos = Position; G = Games played; AB = At bats; H = Hits; Avg. = Batting average; HR = Home runs; RBI = Runs batted in

Pos	Player	G	AB	H	Avg.	HR	RBI
C	Dick Buckley	71	260	71	.273	5	22
1B	Dude Esterbrook	64	246	54	.220	0	17
2B	Charley Bassett	128	481	116	.241	2	60
3B	Jerry Denny	126	524	137	.261	12	63
SS	Jack Glasscock	113	442	119	.269	1	45
OF	Emmett Seery	133	500	110	.220	5	50
OF	Paul Hines	133	513	144	.281	4	58
OF	Jack McGeachey	118	452	99	.219	0	30

==== Other batters ====
Note: G = Games played; AB = At bats; H = Hits; Avg. = Batting average; HR = Home runs; RBI = Runs batted in

Player	G	AB	H	Avg.	HR	RBI
George Myers	66	248	59	.238	2	16
Con Daily	57	202	44	.218	0	14
Jumbo Schoeneck	48	169	40	.237	0	20
Otto Schomberg	30	112	24	.214	1	10

=== Pitching ===
==== Starting pitchers ====
Note: G = Games pitched; IP = Innings pitched; W = Wins; L = Losses; ERA = Earned run average; SO = Strikeouts

Player	G	IP	W	L	ERA	SO
Henry Boyle	37	323.0	15	22	3.26	98
Egyptian Healy	37	321.1	12	24	3.89	124
Lev Shreve	35	297.2	11	24	4.63	101
Bill Burdick	20	176.0	10	10	2.81	55
Sam Moffet	7	56.0	2	5	4.66	7

==== Relief pitchers ====
Note: G = Games pitched; W = Wins; L = Losses; SV = Saves; ERA = Earned run average; SO = Strikeouts

Player	G	W	L	SV	ERA	SO
Jumbo Schoeneck	2	0	0	0	0.00	1
Jack McGeachey	1	0	0	0	7.20	0
Jerry Denny	1	0	0	0	9.00	1
Jack Glasscock	1	0	0	0	54.00	1
