= List of New York Metropolitans managers =

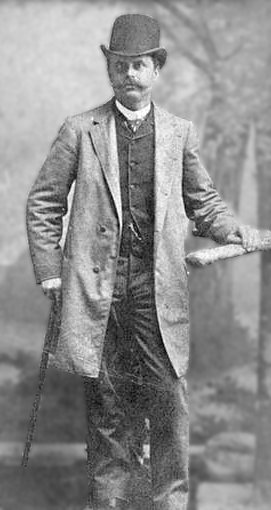
Jim Mutrie

The New York Metropolitans were a Major League Baseball team that played in New York City. They played in the American Association from 1883 through 1887. During their time as a Major League team, the Metropolitans employed five different managers. The duties of the team manager include team strategy and leadership on and off the field.

The Metropolitans' first manager was Jim Mutrie, also known as "Truthful Jim". Mutrie managed the team in 1883 and led them to a record of 54 wins and 42 losses. Mutrie also managed the Metropolitans for the 1884 season. In their second season, Mutrie led the Metropolitans to a record of 75 wins and 32 losses, which garnered them the American Association league title. The team went on to face the Providence Grays in the 1884 World Series, and lost three game to zero. The 19th century World Series was considered an exhibition contest between the champion of the National League and the champion of the American Association. After the 1884 season, Mutrie left to manage the New York Giants of the National League.

The Metropolitans' second manager was Jim Gifford. He joined the team for their third season in the American Association after having managed a portion of the 1884 Indianapolis Hoosiers, also of the American Association. In 1885, Gifford led the team to a record of 44 wins and 64 losses. Gifford continued to manage the Metropolitans for the 1886 season. But, after 17 games, and a 5 win and 12 loss start, Gifford was replaced with veteran manager Bob Ferguson. Ferguson became the team's third manager during their fourth season, and they were his eighth and last team he managed. Ferguson led the team to a record 48 win and 70 loss finish in 1886. Ferguson stayed with the team for the 1887 season, their fifth season as a franchise, but after a 6 win and 24 loss start, he was replaced with the teams' first baseman, Dave Orr, who became the player-manager. However, after eight games, and a record of 3 wins and 5 losses, he was also replaced as manager of the team. Orr's replacement was baseball newspaper columnist and former manager of the Cincinnati Red Stockings, who finished the season with a record of 35 wins and 60 losses. Caylor was the fifth and last manager for the Metropolitans, who ceased operations after the 1887 season.

== Table key ==
#	A running total of the number of Metropolitans' managers. Any manager who has two or more separate terms is only counted once.
G	Number of regular season games managed; may not equal sum of wins and losses due to tie games
W	Number of regular season wins in games managed
L	Number of regular season losses in games managed
WPct	Winning percentage: number of wins divided by number of games managed
PA	Playoff appearances: number of years this manager has led the franchise to the playoffs
PW	Playoff wins: number of wins this manager has accrued in the playoffs
PL	Playoff losses: number of losses this manager has accrued in the playoffs
LC	League Championships: number of League Championships, or pennants, achieved by the manager
WS	World Series: number of World Series victories achieved by the manager

== Managers ==
#	Images	Manager	Seasons	G	W	L	WPct	PA	PW	PL	LC	WS	Ref
1		Jim Mutrie	1883–1884	209	129	74	.635	—	—	—	1	—	
2		Jim Gifford	1885–1886	125	42	76	.392	—	—	—	—	—	
3		Bob Ferguson	1886–1887	150	54	94	.365	—	—	—	—	—	
4		Dave Orr	1887	8	3	5	.375	—	—	—	—	—	
5		O. P. Caylor	1887	100	35	60	.368	—	—	—	—	—	

== Footnotes ==
- ^{a} Although the Metropolitans participated in the tournament called the World Series in 1884, the 19th century World Series was a very different event from the current World Series, which began in 1903. The 19th century World Series was considered an exhibition contest between the champion of the National League and the champion of the American Association. The Providence Grays defeated the Metropolitans in the 1884 World Series by winning all three games.
