= 1888 Detroit Wolverines season =

1888 Detroit Wolverines
- League: National League
- Ballpark: Recreation Park
- City: Detroit, Michigan
- Record: 68–63 (.519)
- League place: 5th
- Owner: Frederick K. Stearns
- Managers: Bill Watkins, Robert Leadley

The 1888 Detroit Wolverines finished the season with a 68–63 record, finishing in fifth place in the National League. After the season, the ownership, having lost so much money on the team, disbanded the team and sold off the players.

== Regular season ==
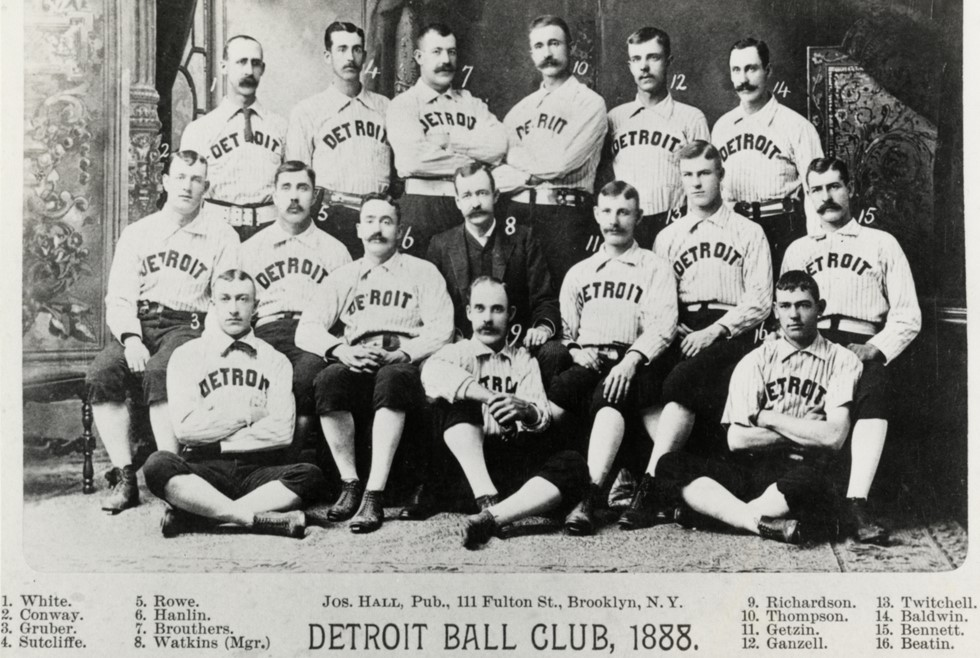
1888 Detroit Wolverines

=== Season standings ===
National League
| Team | W | L | Pct. | GB | Home | Road |
|---|---|---|---|---|---|---|
| New York Giants | 84 | 47 | .641 | — | 44‍–‍23 | 40‍–‍24 |
| Chicago White Stockings | 77 | 58 | .570 | 9 | 43‍–‍27 | 34‍–‍31 |
| Philadelphia Quakers | 69 | 61 | .531 | 14½ | 37‍–‍29 | 32‍–‍32 |
| Boston Beaneaters | 70 | 64 | .522 | 15½ | 36‍–‍30 | 34‍–‍34 |
| Detroit Wolverines | 68 | 63 | .519 | 16 | 40‍–‍26 | 28‍–‍37 |
| Pittsburgh Alleghenys | 66 | 68 | .493 | 19½ | 37‍–‍30 | 29‍–‍38 |
| Indianapolis Hoosiers | 50 | 85 | .370 | 36 | 31‍–‍35 | 19‍–‍50 |
| Washington Nationals | 48 | 86 | .358 | 37½ | 26‍–‍38 | 22‍–‍48 |

=== Record vs. opponents ===
1888 National League record Sources:
| Team | BSN | CHI | DET | IND | NYG | PHI | PIT | WAS |
|---|---|---|---|---|---|---|---|---|
| Boston | — | 7–12 | 10–8–1 | 11–9 | 8–12 | 9–10 | 10–8–2 | 15–5 |
| Chicago | 12–7 | — | 10–10 | 14–6 | 11–8–1 | 8–10 | 9–11 | 13–6 |
| Detroit | 8–10–1 | 10–10 | — | 11–8 | 7–11–2 | 11–7 | 10–10 | 11–7 |
| Indianapolis | 9–11 | 6–14 | 8–11 | — | 5–14 | 4–13 | 6–14 | 12–8–1 |
| New York | 12–8 | 8–11–1 | 11–7–2 | 14–5 | — | 14–5–1 | 10–7–2 | 15–4–1 |
| Philadelphia | 10–9 | 10–8 | 7–11 | 13–4 | 5–14–1 | — | 14–6–1 | 10–9 |
| Pittsburgh | 8–10–2 | 11–9 | 10–10 | 14–6 | 7–10–2 | 6–14–1 | — | 10–9 |
| Washington | 5–15 | 6–13 | 7–11 | 8–12–1 | 4–15–1 | 9–10 | 9–10 | — |

=== Roster ===
1888 Detroit Wolverines
Roster
| Pitchers: Lady Baldwin; Ed Beatin; Pete Conway; Pretzels Getzien; Henry Gruber; Catchers: Charlie Bennett; Cal Broughton; Barney Gilligan; Deacon McGuire; Jake Wells | Infielders: Dan Brouthers; Charlie Ganzel; Sam LaRocque; Parson Nicholson; Hardy Richardson; Jack Rowe; Frank Scheibeck; Sy Sutcliffe; Deacon White | Outfielders: Count Campau; Ned Hanlon; Ted Scheffler; Sam Thompson; Larry Twitchell | Manager: Robert Leadley; Bill Watkins |

== Player stats ==
=== Batting ===
==== Starters by position ====
Note: Pos = Position; G = Games played; AB = At bats; H = Hits; Avg. = Batting average; HR = Home runs; RBI = Runs batted in

| Pos | Player | G | AB | H | Avg. | HR | RBI |
|---|---|---|---|---|---|---|---|
| C | Charlie Bennett | 74 | 258 | 68 | .264 | 5 | 29 |
| 1B | Dan Brouthers | 129 | 522 | 160 | .307 | 9 | 66 |
| 2B | Hardy Richardson | 58 | 266 | 77 | .289 | 6 | 32 |
| SS | Jack Rowe | 105 | 451 | 125 | .277 | 2 | 74 |
| 3B | Deacon White | 125 | 527 | 157 | .298 | 4 | 71 |
| OF | Count Campau | 70 | 251 | 51 | .203 | 1 | 18 |
| OF | Larry Twitchell | 131 | 524 | 128 | .244 | 5 | 67 |
| OF | Ned Hanlon | 109 | 459 | 122 | .266 | 5 | 39 |

==== Other batters ====
Note: G = Games played; AB = At bats; H = Hits; Avg. = Batting average; HR = Home runs; RBI = Runs batted in

| Player | G | AB | H | Avg. | HR | RBI |
|---|---|---|---|---|---|---|
| Charlie Ganzel | 95 | 386 | 96 | .249 | 1 | 46 |
| Sam Thompson | 56 | 238 | 67 | .282 | 6 | 40 |
| Sy Sutcliffe | 49 | 191 | 49 | .257 | 0 | 23 |
| Ted Scheffler | 27 | 94 | 19 | .202 | 0 | 4 |
| Parson Nicholson | 24 | 85 | 22 | .259 | 1 | 9 |
| Jake Wells | 16 | 57 | 9 | .158 | 0 | 2 |
| Deacon McGuire | 3 | 13 | 0 | .000 | 0 | 0 |
| Sam LaRocque | 2 | 9 | 4 | .444 | 0 | 2 |
| Barney Gilligan | 1 | 5 | 1 | .200 | 0 | 0 |
| Frank Scheibeck | 1 | 4 | 0 | .000 | 0 | 0 |
| Cal Broughton | 1 | 4 | 0 | .000 | 0 | 0 |

=== Pitching ===
==== Starting pitchers ====
Note: G = Games pitched; IP = Innings pitched; W = Wins; L = Losses; ERA = Earned run average; SO = Strikeouts

| Player | G | IP | W | L | ERA | SO |
|---|---|---|---|---|---|---|
| Pretzels Getzien | 46 | 404.0 | 19 | 25 | 3.05 | 202 |
| Pete Conway | 45 | 391.0 | 30 | 14 | 2.26 | 176 |
| Henry Gruber | 27 | 240.0 | 11 | 14 | 2.29 | 71 |
| Ed Beatin | 12 | 107.0 | 5 | 7 | 2.86 | 44 |
| Lady Baldwin | 6 | 53.0 | 3 | 3 | 5.43 | 26 |

==== Relief pitchers ====
Note: G = Games pitched; W = Wins; L = Losses; SV = Saves; ERA = Earned run average; SO = Strikeouts

| Player | G | W | L | SV | ERA | SO |
|---|---|---|---|---|---|---|
| Larry Twitchell | 2 | 0 | 0 | 1 | 6.75 | 3 |
