= Cape May Athletic Park =

Former athletic field in Cape May, New Jersey

- Interactive map of Cape May Athletic Park
- Location: Benton Ave & Sewell Ave, Cape May, New Jersey 08204
- Coordinates: 38.933128°N 74.917483°W
- Operator: Cape May City Athletic Association
- Surface: Grass
- Field size: Left Field – ft Center Field – ft Right Field – ft

Construction
- Opened: September 1, 1887

Tenants
- Cape May Base Ball Club (semi-professional) (1887–1893); Philadelphia Phillies (NL) (spring training) (1888, 1898)

The Cape May Athletic Park was an athletic field and baseball diamond in Cape May, New Jersey owned and operated by the Cape May City Athletic Association. The athletic park was utilized for multiple sports including baseball. The C.M.C.A.A.'s Cape May Base Ball Club played home games at the park and the Philadelphia Phillies held spring training at the Athletic Park in 1888 and 1898. The Cape May Athletic Park would be displaced by 1920 by housing development at the site.

== Cape May City Athletic Association ==
The Cape May City Athletic Association (C.M.C.A.A.) was founded as a member of the Amateur Union in 1887 to offer athletics for participation and entertainment during the summer months when visitors swelled the town's population. The Association was started by then-Congressman John Reyburn, Burr McIntosh, and Luther Price. Congressman Reyburn would lead the baseball club through 1893 when stewardship was transferred to a citizen committee.

The Athletic Association planned to field teams in multiple sports, and early on focused on baseball. The C.M.C.A.A. would field a baseball team each summer composed of collegiate and amateur players including many Princeton College, University of Pennsylvania, and Lehigh players. The team played a two-month schedule each summer primarily against semi-professional and amateur clubs. In some years a league was organized with baseball teams in Atlantic City, Wildwood, Ocean City, and other shore towns. Cape May would often play the Cuban Giants, and played the Phillies in mid-season games at the Park when Major League clubs filled their off-days with exhibitions for additional revenue.

The Athletic Park was also utilized for pigeon and clay shooting which remained popular in the late nineteenth century.

In March 1909 the Cape May Athletic Association was reported to have re-formed with a basketball team with plans to organize a baseball team for the forthcoming summer.

== Athletic Park ==
The Cape May City Athletic Association opened the Athletic Park with a series of events the weekend of Thursday, September 1, to Saturday, September 2, 1887, which preceded the first observed Labor Day in New Jersey following the legislature's approval of the holiday earlier in the year. On September 1, the Young America baseball club was engaged to play a team of area collegians and amateurs. A pigeon shoot was held on September 2, and a track and field meet scheduled for September 3.

The Philadelphia Phillies first came to Cape May for spring training in 1888. The team stayed at the Chalfonte Hotel, and practiced and played their games on the Athletic Field. The Phillies returned to Cape May for spring training in 1891. They stayed at the Aldine Hotel and planned to practice again at the Cape May Athletic Field, but finding it not fit for use, the Phillies instead practiced on the Gas House field.

President Benjamin Harrison visited Cape May in August 1891. On August 11, 1891, Harrison, accompanied by his secretary, Major Elijah W. Halford, visited the Athletic Park where they saw the Gorhams, an African-American club, defeat Cape May 5 to 0.

As late as January 1898, Phillies manager Bill Shettsline had wanted to take the team south for spring training while team owner Colonel John Rogers favored Cape May. The Phillies would return to Cape May and again stay at the Aldine Hotel in 1898 but return to practice and play at the Athletic Park. The Phillies held only practices and played intrasquad games at the Athletic Park in 1891 and 1898, returning to Philadelphia to host and play exhibition game against amateur, semi professional, and minor league clubs in Philadelphia prior to Opening Day.

Following Congressman Reyburn's departure from the Cape May team's leadership in 1893, the Athletic Association was obligated to find new grounds.

The Athletic Grounds were upgraded ahead of the 1896 season.

On August 18, 1896, Cape May welcomed the National League's Louisville Colonels to their Lafayette Street park. On August 30, 1897, the Phillies traveled to Cape May where they defeated Cape May 9 to 6; Andy Boswell, who had appeared in the Major Leagues in 1895, and would be elected to the New Jersey General Assembly from Cape May, pitched for Cape May and took the loss.

The Athletic Association was reported to have found itself without grounds on which to play as the Cape May County League opened in June 1908.

A housing development would displace Cape May Athletic Park below Sewell Street, and the Cape May baseball club would move to Columbia Park on the northwest corner of Columbia and Madison Avenues, the present-day site of the water tower.
