= 1888 Boston Beaneaters season =

1888 Boston Beaneaters
- League: National League
- Ballpark: South End Grounds
- City: Boston, Massachusetts
- Record: 70–64 (.522)
- League place: 4th
- Owner: Arthur Soden
- Manager: John Morrill

The 1888 Boston Beaneaters season was the 18th season of the franchise.

== Regular season ==
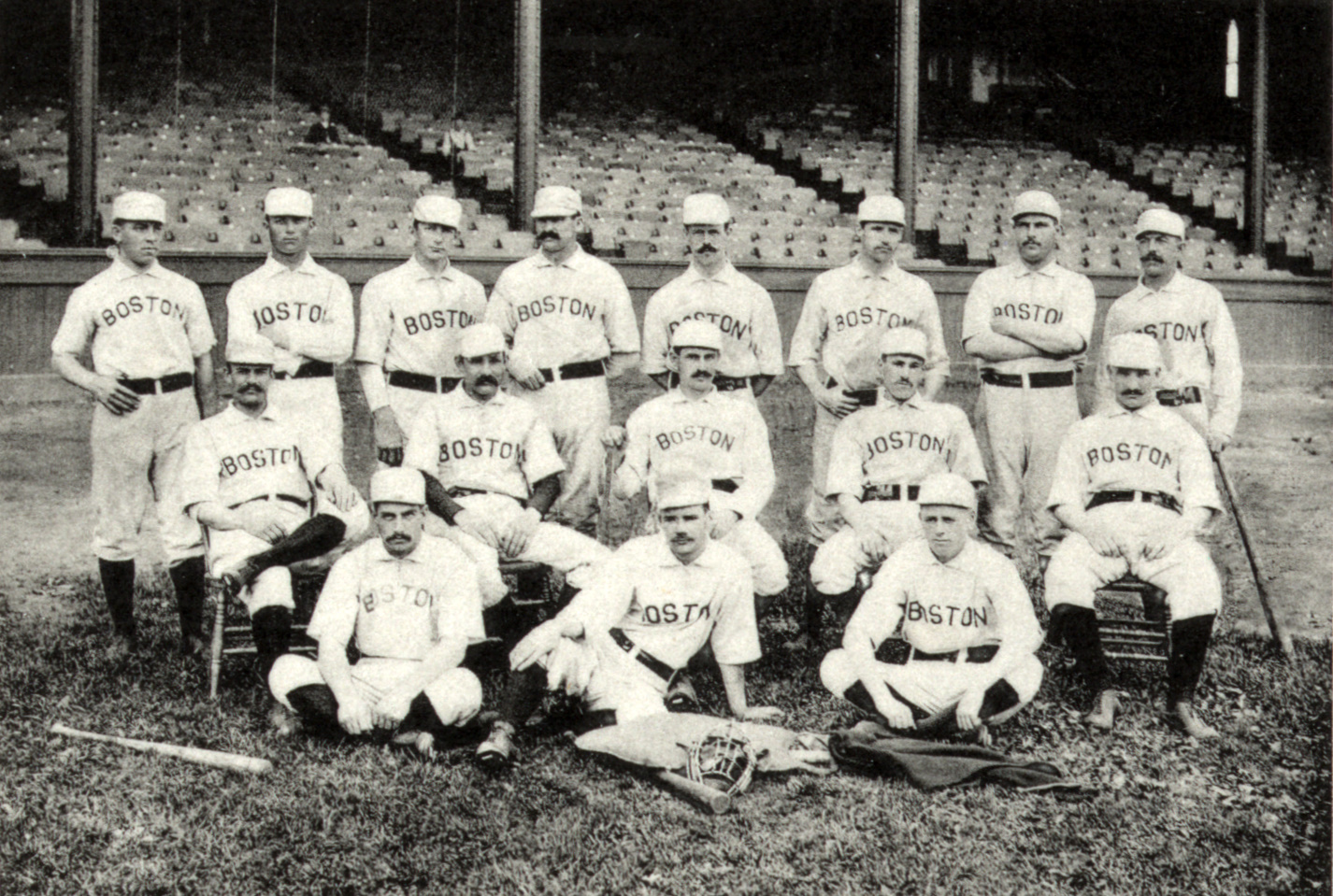
1888 Boston Beaneaters

=== Season standings ===
National League
Team	W	L	Pct.	GB	Home	Road
New York Giants	84	47	.641	—	44‍–‍23	40‍–‍24
Chicago White Stockings	77	58	.570	9	43‍–‍27	34‍–‍31
Philadelphia Quakers	69	61	.531	14½	37‍–‍29	32‍–‍32
Boston Beaneaters	70	64	.522	15½	36‍–‍30	34‍–‍34
Detroit Wolverines	68	63	.519	16	40‍–‍26	28‍–‍37
Pittsburgh Alleghenys	66	68	.493	19½	37‍–‍30	29‍–‍38
Indianapolis Hoosiers	50	85	.370	36	31‍–‍35	19‍–‍50
Washington Nationals	48	86	.358	37½	26‍–‍38	22‍–‍48

=== Record vs. opponents ===
1888 National League record Sources:
Team	BSN	CHI	DET	IND	NYG	PHI	PIT	WAS
Boston	—	7–12	10–8–1	11–9	8–12	9–10	10–8–2	15–5
Chicago	12–7	—	10–10	14–6	11–8–1	8–10	9–11	13–6
Detroit	8–10–1	10–10	—	11–8	7–11–2	11–7	10–10	11–7
Indianapolis	9–11	6–14	8–11	—	5–14	4–13	6–14	12–8–1
New York	12–8	8–11–1	11–7–2	14–5	—	14–5–1	10–7–2	15–4–1
Philadelphia	10–9	10–8	7–11	13–4	5–14–1	—	14–6–1	10–9
Pittsburgh	8–10–2	11–9	10–10	14–6	7–10–2	6–14–1	—	10–9
Washington	5–15	6–13	7–11	8–12–1	4–15–1	9–10	9–10	—

=== Roster ===
1888 Boston Beaneaters roster
Roster
Pitchers: John Clarkson; Dick Conway; Kid Madden; Old Hoss Radbourn; Bill Sowders; Catchers: King Kelly; Tom O'Rourke; Andy Sommers; Pop Tate	Infielders: Jack Burdock; Bill Higgins; Billy Klusman; John Morrill; Billy Nash; Joe Quinn; Irv Ray; Ezra Sutton; Sam Wise	Outfielders: Tom Brown; Ed Glenn; Mike Hines; Joe Hornung; Dick Johnston; Nick Wise	Manager: John Morrill

== Player stats ==
=== Batting ===
==== Starters by position ====
Note: Pos = Position; G = Games played; AB = At bats; H = Hits; Avg. = Batting average; HR = Home runs; RBI = Runs batted in

Pos	Player	G	AB	H	Avg.	HR	RBI
C	King Kelly	107	440	140	.318	9	71
1B	John Morrill	135	486	96	.198	4	36
2B	Joe Quinn	38	156	47	.301	4	29
SS	Sam Wise	105	417	100	.240	4	40
3B	Billy Nash	135	526	149	.283	4	75
OF	Joe Hornung	107	431	103	.239	3	53
OF	Tom Brown	107	420	104	.248	9	49
OF	Dick Johnston	135	585	173	.296	12	68

==== Other batters ====
Note: G = Games played; AB = At bats; H = Hits; Avg. = Batting average; HR = Home runs; RBI = Runs batted in

Player	G	AB	H	Avg.	HR	RBI
Irv Ray	50	206	51	.248	2	26
Pop Tate	41	148	34	.230	1	6
Ezra Sutton	28	110	24	.218	1	16
Billy Klusman	28	107	18	.168	2	11
Jack Burdock	22	79	16	.203	0	4
Tom O'Rourke	20	74	13	.176	0	4
Ed Glenn	20	65	10	.154	0	3
Bill Higgins	14	54	10	.185	0	4
Mike Hines	4	16	2	.125	0	2
Andy Sommers	4	13	3	.231	0	0
Nick Wise	1	3	0	.000	0	0

=== Pitching ===
==== Starting pitchers ====
Note: G = Games pitched; IP = Innings pitched; W = Wins; L = Losses; ERA = Earned run average; SO = Strikeouts

Player	G	IP	W	L	ERA	SO
John Clarkson	54	483.1	33	20	2.76	223
Bill Sowders	36	317.0	19	15	2.07	132
Old Hoss Radbourn	24	207.0	7	16	2.87	64
Kid Madden	20	168.0	7	11	2.95	53
Dick Conway	6	53.0	4	2	2.38	12
