= Gloucester Point Grounds =

Former baseball ground in Gloucester City, New Jersey

Coordinates: 39°53′29″N 75°07′35″W

Gloucester Point Grounds is a former baseball ground located in Gloucester City, New Jersey. The ground, roughly bounded by the present day streets: 5th St, Jersey Ave, 7th St, Charles St, and Pine St and then located just behind Thompson's Hotel, along a creek, was the part-time home to the Philadelphia Athletics of the American Association from 1888 to 1890.
