= Henry Yaik =

American baseball player (1864–1935)

- Catcher / Outfielder
- Born: March 1, 1864; Detroit, Michigan, U.S.
- Died: September 21, 1935 (aged 71); Detroit, Michigan, U.S.
- Batted: Left Threw: Left

MLB debut
- October 3, 1888, for the Pittsburgh Alleghenys

Last MLB appearance
- October 4, 1888, for the Pittsburgh Alleghenys

MLB statistics
- At bats: 6
- Hits: 2
- Runs batted in: 1
- Stats at Baseball Reference

Teams
- Pittsburgh Alleghenys (1888)

Henry Yaik (March 1, 1864 – September 21, 1935) was an American professional baseball player. He played two games in Major League Baseball for the Pittsburgh Alleghenys in October 1888, one as a catcher and one as a left fielder. He collected two hits, a walk, and a RBI in seven plate appearances.
