= Art Whitney =

American baseball player (1858–1943)

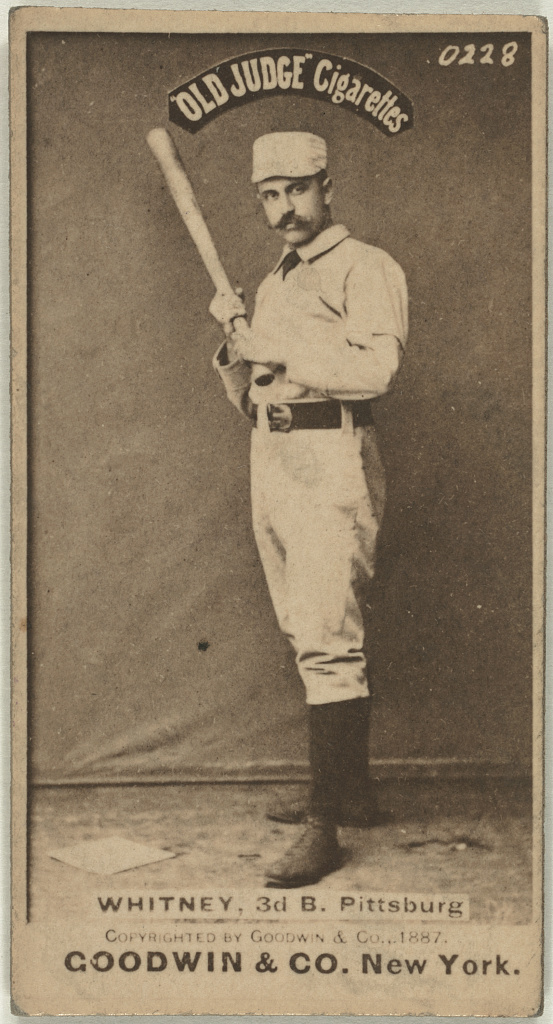
- 1887 baseball card of Whitney
- Third baseman
- Born: January 16, 1858; Brockton, Massachusetts, U.S.
- Died: August 15, 1943 (aged 85); Lowell, Massachusetts, U.S.
- Batted: Right Threw: Right

MLB debut
- May 1, 1880, for the Worcester Worcesters

Last MLB appearance
- August 22, 1891, for the St. Louis Browns

MLB statistics
- Batting average: .223
- Home runs: 6
- Runs batted in: 349
- Stats at Baseball Reference

Teams
- Worcester Worcesters (1880); Detroit Wolverines (1881–1882); Providence Grays (1882); Pittsburgh Alleghenys (1884–1887); New York Giants (NL) (1888–1889); New York Giants (PL) (1890); Cincinnati Kelly's Killers (1891); St. Louis Browns (1891)

Arthur Wilson Whitney (January 16, 1858 – August 15, 1943) was an American professional baseball player whose career spanned from 1877 to 1893. He played 11 seasons in Major League Baseball, principally as a third baseman (802 games) and shortstop (168 games), for eight different major league clubs.

Whitney's longest stretches were with the Pittsburgh Alleghenys (368 games, 1884–1887) and New York Giants (219 games, 1888–1889). He helped the Giants win the 1888 and 1889 World Series.

In 11 major league seasons, Whitney compiled a .223 batting average and a .285 on-base percentage, scored 475 runs, and had 820 hits, including 137 extra-base hits. Whitney's true value was as a defensive player on the infield. He led his league in fielding percentage four times, three times as a third baseman (1886, 1887, and 1891) and once as a shortstop (1885). In 1886, his Defensive WAR rating of 1.6 was the fourth highest among all position players in the American Association. His career range factor of 3.39 at third base remains the 23rd highest in major league history.

== Early years ==
Whitney was born in 1858 in Brockton, Massachusetts. His parents, George and Paulene Whitney, were both Massachusetts natives. Whitney grew up in North Bridgewater, Massachusetts, where his father was a dentist.

Whitney's older brother, Frank "Jumbo" Whitney, also played professional baseball.

== Professional baseball career ==
=== Minor leagues ===
Whitney began his professional baseball career with the Lowell, Massachusetts based Lowell Ladies Men team during the 1877 and 1878 seasons. He also played for a team in New Bedford, Massachusetts. In 1879, he played for the Worcester Worcesters.

=== Worcester ===
In 1880, the Worcester Worcesters were admitted to the National League and attained major league status. Whitney was the starting third baseman for the 1880 Worcesters, appearing in 76 games and compiling a .222 batting average.

=== Detroit and Providence ===
Whitney next played for the Detroit Wolverines of the National League during the 1881 season and part of the 1882 season. He appeared in a total of 89 games for Detroit, 80 of them at third base, eight at shortstop, and three as a pitcher. He compiled a batting average of .182 for Detroit in 1881 and .183 in 1882.

Whitney also appeared in 11 games, all of them at shortstop, for the Providence Grays during the 1882 season. He compiled an .075 batting average for Providence and was released in June 1882.

=== Return to the minors ===
After a poor showing at the plate during the 1881 and 1882 seasons, Whitney returned to the minor leagues. He played for the Saginaw, Michigan team in the Northwestern League during the 1883 and 1884 seasons.

=== Pittsburgh ===
In 1885, Whitney joined the Pittsburgh Alleghenys and remained there for four years through the 1888 season. In his four years with the Alleghenys, he appeared in 368 games and compiled a .248 batting average. With the benefit of 123 bases on balls and nine times hit by pitch, Whitney boosted his on-base percentage during that same time period to .312. He also scored 190 runs and had 134 RBIs for the Alleghenys.

=== New York ===
In June 1888, the Alleghenys traded Whitney to the New York Giants for Elmer Cleveland. Whitney remained with the Giants through the 1889 season and appeared in 219 games, all at third base. He scored 99 runs and compiled a .218 batting average and .279 on-base percentage with the Giants. The Giants won the pennant both years that Whitney was with the team, and Whitney helped the Giants win both the 1888 World Series and the 1889 World Series, contributing 20 hits, 15 RBIs and 11 runs scored in two years of World Series play.

=== Players' League ===
Whitney jumped to the Players' League for the 1890 season, signing with the New York Giants. He appeared in 119 Players' League games, including 88 at third base and 31 at shortstop. He compiled a .219 batting average, but 64 bases on balls boosted his on-base percentage to .322.

=== 1891 season ===
The Players' League disbanded after one season, and in March 1891, Whitney signed as a free agent with the Cincinnati Kelly's Killers of the American Association. He appeared in 93 games for Cincinnati, all at third base, and compiled a .199 batting average and .270 on-base percentage. Whitney was released by Cincinnati in late August and concluded his major league career with the St. Louis Browns. He appeared in only three games for the Browns, with his last major league game occurring on August 22, 1891, when he was 33 years old.

=== Final years in the minors ===
Before retiring from the game, Whitney played two additional seasons, 1892 and 1893, with the Lowell, Massachusetts team in the New England League.

== Later years ==
Whitney was married in approximately 1881 to Rowena Locke. After retiring from baseball, Whitney worked for many years for the Victor Sporting Goods Company in Springfield, Massachusetts. Whitney's brother, Charles Whitney, founded the company, which was later absorbed by A. G. Spalding & Sons.

At the time of the 1900, 1910, 1920 and 1930 censuses, Whitney was living in Springfield, Massachusetts with his wife, Rowena. In 1900, he was employed in the sporting goods manufacturing business.

Whitney died in 1943 at age 85 at his home in Lowell, Massachusetts, after a short illness. He was buried at the Edson Cemetery in Lowell.
