= John Greenig =

American baseball player (1848–1913)

- Pitcher
- Born: c. 1848; Philadelphia, Pennsylvania, U.S.
- Died: July 28, 1913 (aged 64–65); Philadelphia, Pennsylvania, U.S.
- Batted: Unknown Threw: Right

MLB debut
- May 9, 1888, for the Washington Nationals

Last MLB appearance
- May 9, 1888, for the Washington Nationals

MLB statistics
- Win–loss record: 0-1
- Earned run average: 11.00
- Strikeouts: 2
- Stats at Baseball Reference

Teams
- Washington Nationals (1888)

John A. Greenig (c. 1848 – July 28, 1913) was an American professional baseball player who played pitcher in the Major Leagues for the Washington Nationals of the National League on May 9, 1888.
