= Bob Pettit (baseball) =

American baseball player (1861–1910)

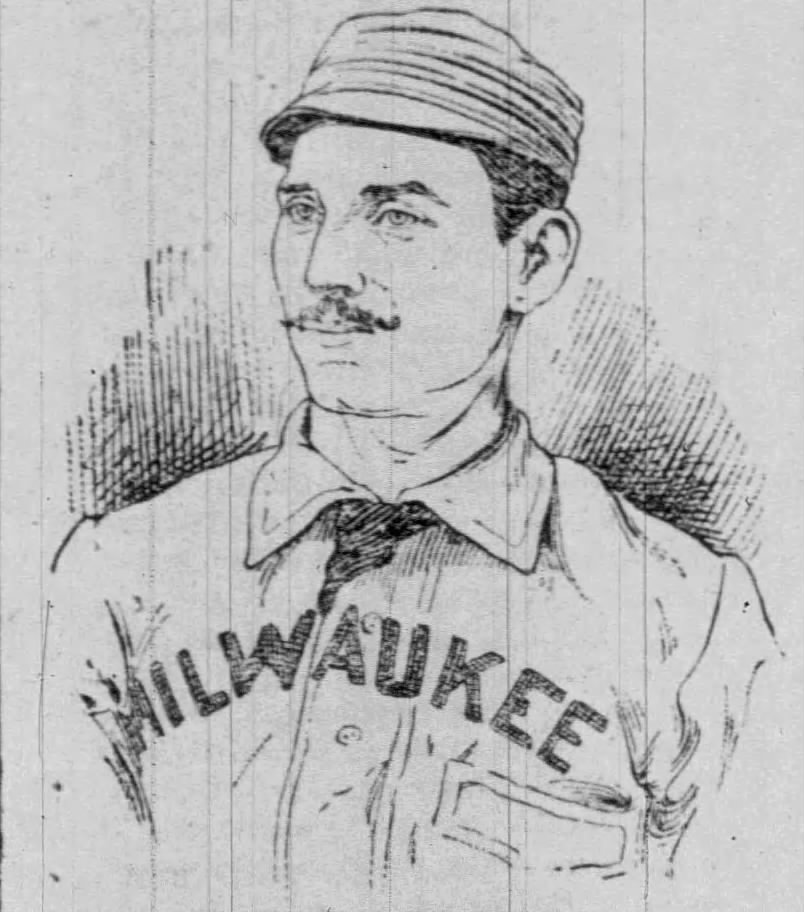
- Outfielder
- Born: July 19, 1861; Williamstown, Massachusetts, U.S.
- Died: November 1, 1910 (aged 49); Derby, Connecticut, U.S.
- Batted: Left Threw: Right

MLB debut
- September 3, 1887, for the Chicago White Stockings

Last MLB appearance
- October 4, 1891, for the Milwaukee Brewers

MLB statistics
- Batting average: .240
- Home runs: 7
- Runs batted in: 40
- Stats at Baseball Reference

Teams
- Chicago White Stockings (1887–1888); Milwaukee Brewers (1891)

Robert Henry Pettit (July 19, 1861 – November 1, 1910) was an American professional baseball player who played outfield in the Major Leagues from 1887 to 1891. He played for the Chicago White Stockings and Milwaukee Brewers.

== See also ==
- List of Major League Baseball annual saves leaders
