= Pete McShannic =

American baseball player (1864–1946)

- Third baseman
- Born: March 20, 1864; Pittsburgh, Pennsylvania, U.S.
- Died: November 30, 1946 (aged 82); Toledo, Ohio, U.S.
- Batted: Switch Threw: Right

MLB debut
- March 20, 1888, for the Pittsburgh Alleghenys

Last MLB appearance
- October 18, 1888, for the Pittsburgh Alleghenys

MLB statistics
- Batting average: .194
- Home runs: 0
- Runs batted in: 5
- Stats at Baseball Reference

Teams
- Pittsburgh Alleghenys (1888)

Peter Robert McShannic (March 20, 1864 – November 30, 1946) was an American Major League Baseball player. He played for the Pittsburgh Alleghenys of the National League during the 1888 baseball season.
