= Shorty Fuller =

American baseball player (1867–1904)

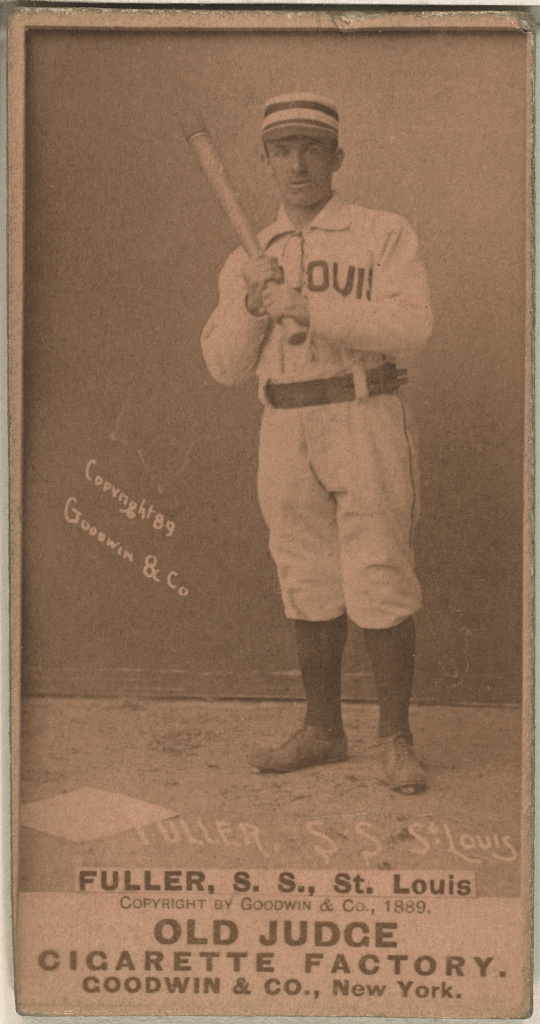
- 1889 baseball card of Fuller
- Shortstop
- Born: October 10, 1867; Cincinnati, Ohio, U.S.
- Died: April 11, 1904 (aged 36); Cincinnati, Ohio, U.S.
- Batted: Right Threw: Right

MLB debut
- July 19, 1888, for the Washington Nationals

Last MLB appearance
- June 2, 1896, for the New York Giants

MLB statistics
- Batting average: .236
- Home runs: 6
- Runs batted in: 350
- Stats at Baseball Reference

Teams
- Washington Nationals (1888); St. Louis Browns (1889–1891); New York Giants (1892–1896)

William Benjamin "Shorty" Fuller (October 10, 1867 – April 11, 1904) was an American professional baseball player who played shortstop in the Major Leagues from 1888 to 1896. Fuller played for the Washington Nationals, St. Louis Browns, and New York Giants. His brother, Harry Fuller, also played professional baseball.
