= Jim Mutrie =

American baseball manager (1851–1938)

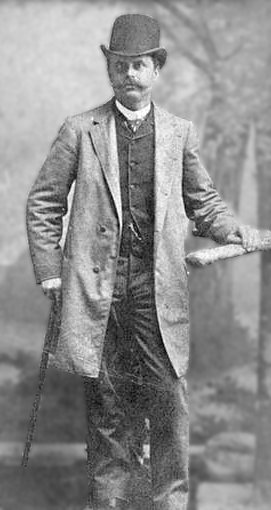
- Mutrie in 1888
- Manager
- Born: June 13, 1851; Chelsea, Massachusetts, U.S.
- Died: January 24, 1938 (aged 86); New York City, New York, U.S.

MLB debut
- May 1, 1883, for the New York Metropolitans

Last MLB appearance
- October 3, 1891, for the New York Giants

MLB statistics
- Managerial record: 658–419–37
- Winning %: .611

Teams
- New York Metropolitans (1883–1884); New York Giants (1885–1891)

Career highlights and awards
- New England League pennant (1878); Eastern Massachusetts Association pennant (1879); Eastern Championship Association pennant (1881); League Alliance pennant (1882); American Association pennant (1884); 2× World Series champion (1888, 1889)

James J. Mutrie (June 13, 1851 – January 24, 1938) was an American baseball pioneer who was the co-founder and first manager of both the original New York Metropolitans and the New York Giants. He had a winning percentage of .611, the highest for the 19th century for managers. It remains the third highest by any major league manager with at least 600 wins, trailing only Joe McCarthy's mark of .615 and Dave Roberts.

== Life ==
Mutrie, nicknamed "Smilin' Jeems" and "Truthful Jim", was born in Chelsea, Massachusetts, and grew up playing cricket, first playing baseball at age 16. He played in the minor leagues from 1877 to 1879. In 1880 he moved from New England to New York, where he obtained financial backing from August Belmont and John B. Day to start the independent New York Metropolitans. At the end of the 1882 season, Day and Mutrie accepted offers from both the American Association and the National League to enter a New York team; they met their double commitment by entering the Mets in the American Association, and acquiring most of the players from the Troy Trojans to form the New York Gothams for the National League.

Mutrie managed the New York Metropolitans from 1880-1882 in the Eastern Championship Association and League Alliance, and winning both of those leagues in 1881 and 1882 respectively. The Metropolitans' record in 1882 was 101-57-3 and they easily won the League Alliance pennant. From 1880-1882, Mutrie managed the New York Metropolitans to a 201-136-7 record. Mutrie managed the Metropolitans in 1883 and 1884, leading them to the 1884 World Series the latter year. In the 1884 World Series, Mutrie faced off against his former manager Frank Bancroft. Bancroft was the manager of the New Bedford Whalers of the New England League in 1878 when Mutrie played for the Whalers. The Whalers won the New England League pennant in 1878.

In 1885, Mutrie switched to managing the Gothams, and is credited with giving them their nickname, the Giants. With star players such as Buck Ewing, Tim Keefe and Roger Connor, the Giants won National League pennants and World Series titles under Mutrie in 1888 and 1889. Ewing, Keefe and many other players defected to the Players' League's New York Giants in 1890, and the National League Giants under Mutrie slumped to sixth and then third place. When the Giants were reorganized after the 1891 season under new ownership, Mutrie was not retained as manager.

== Personal life ==
After leaving baseball, Mutrie operated a hotel in Elmira, New York and a newsstand on Staten Island. He died of cancer on Roosevelt Island in New York City at age 86. He was buried at the Moravian Cemetery on Staten Island.

== Managerial record ==
Team	Year	Regular season					Postseason			
Team	Year	Games	Won	Lost	Win %	Finish	Won	Lost	Win %	Result
NYM	1883	97 (Note: Mutrie also managed in one game that ended in a tie)	54	42	.563	4th in AA	–	–	–	–
NYM	1884	112 (Note: Mutrie also managed in five games that ended in a tie)	75	32	.701	1st in AA	0	3	.000	Lost in 1884 World Series
NYG	1885	112	85	27	.759	2nd in NL	-	-	-	-
NYG	1886	124 (Note: Mutrie also managed in five games that ended in a tie)	75	44	.630	3rd in NL	-	-	-	-
NYG	1887	129 (Note: Mutrie also managed in six games that ended in a tie)	68	55	.553	4th in NL	-	-	-	-
NYG	1888	138 (Note: Mutrie also managed in seven games that ended in a tie)	84	47	.641	1st in NL	6	4	.600	Won World Series (STL)
NYG	1889	131 (Note: Mutrie also managed in five games that ended in a tie)	83	43	.659	1st in NL	6	3	.667	Won World Series (BKN)
NYG	1890	135 (Note: Mutrie also managed in four games that ended in a tie)	63	68	.481	6th in NL	–	–	–	–
NYG	1891	136 (Note: Mutrie also managed in four games that ended in a tie)	71	61	.538	3rd in NL	–	–	–	–
Total		1,114 (Note: Mutrie also managed in 37 games that ended in ties)	658	419	.611		12	10	.545	
