= Gil Hatfield =

American baseball player (1855–1921)

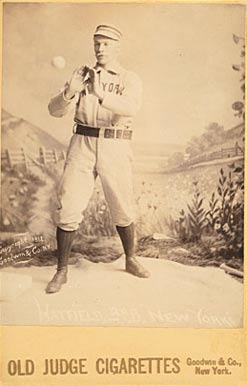
- Third baseman/Shortstop
- Born: January 27, 1855; Hoboken, New Jersey, U.S.
- Died: May 27, 1921 (aged 66); Hoboken, New Jersey, U.S.
- Batted: Unknown Threw: Right

MLB debut
- September 24, 1885, for the Buffalo Bisons

Last MLB appearance
- May 8, 1895, for the Louisville Colonels

MLB statistics
- Batting average: .247
- Hits: 297
- Runs: 179
- Stats at Baseball Reference

Teams
- Buffalo Bisons (1885); New York Giants (1887–1889); New York Giants (PL) (1890); Washington Statesmen (1891); Brooklyn Grooms (1893); Louisville Colonels (1895)

Gilbert Hatfield (January 27, 1855 – May 27, 1921), nicknamed "Colonel", was an American professional baseball player who played third base and shortstop in the Major Leagues from 1885 to 1895. He was interred at Fairview Cemetery in Fairview, New Jersey. He was the brother of fellow major leaguer John Hatfield.
