= William Brown (baseball) =

American baseball player (1866–1897)

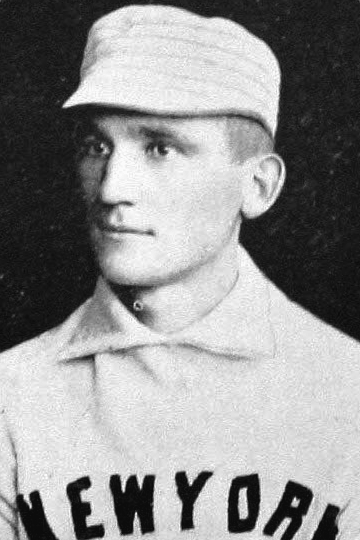
- First baseman / Catcher
- Born: 1866; San Francisco, California, U.S.
- Died: December 20, 1897 (aged 30–31); Philadelphia, Pennsylvania, U.S.
- Batted: Right Threw: Right

MLB debut
- May 10, 1887, for the New York Giants

Last MLB appearance
- May 20, 1894, for the St. Louis Browns

MLB statistics
- Batting average: .261
- Home runs: 6
- Runs scored: 236
- Stats at Baseball Reference

Teams
- New York Giants (1887–1889); New York Giants (PL) (1890); Philadelphia Phillies (1891); Baltimore Orioles (1893); Louisville Colonels (1893–1894); St. Louis Browns (1894)

William M. Brown (1866 – December 20, 1897), nicknamed "Big Bill", was an American Major League Baseball player who played infield from 1887-1894. He played for the New York Giants, New York Giants (PL), Philadelphia Phillies, Baltimore Orioles, and Louisville Colonels.

In 1895, Brown developed a problem with his lungs. He travelled to Hawaii, southern California, and Arizona in an effort to find a climate that would be more beneficial for his health, but his efforts were unsuccessful, and he died as a result of his condition at home in San Francisco in 1897.
