= Walter Hewett =

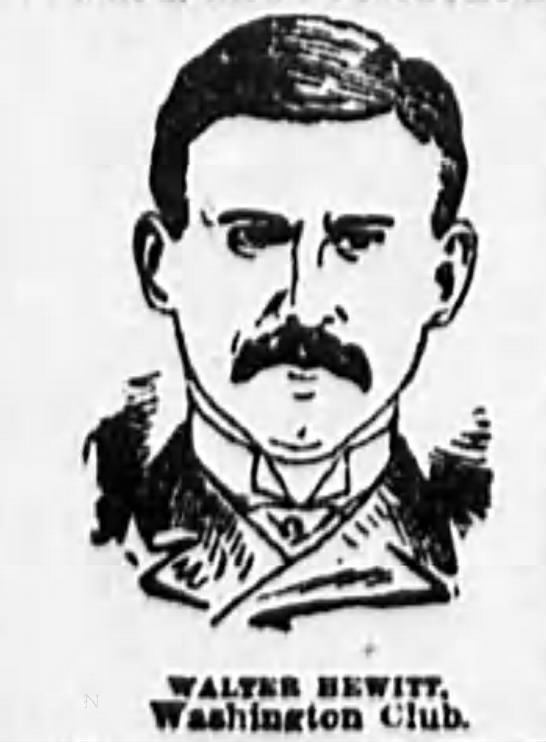
- Hewett as depicted in the November 21, 1888 edition of The Sun.
- Manager
- Born: 1861; Washington, D.C.
- Died: October 7, 1944 (aged 82–83); Washington, D.C.
- Batted: Unknown Threw: Unknown

MLB statistics
- Managerial W–L: 10–29
- Games: 40
- Winning percentage: .256

Teams
- Washington Nationals (1888)

Walter F. Hewett (1861 – October 7, 1944) was a baseball manager in the National League. In 1888, his only season as manager, he managed the Washington Nationals to a record of 10 wins and 29 losses in 40 games.

== See also ==
- List of managers of defunct Major League Baseball teams
