= Bill George (baseball) =

American baseball player (1865–1916)

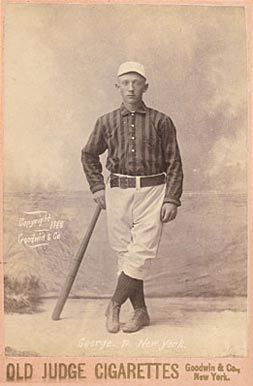
- Pitcher/Outfielder
- Born: January 27, 1865; Bellaire, Ohio, U.S.
- Died: August 23, 1916 (aged 51); Wheeling, West Virginia, U.S.
- Batted: Right Threw: Left

MLB debut
- May 11, 1887, for the New York Giants

Last MLB appearance
- July 9, 1889, for the Columbus Solonsa

MLB statistics
- Pitching Record: 5–10
- Earned run average: 4.51
- Strikeouts: 78
- Stats at Baseball Reference

Teams
- New York Giants (1887–1888); Columbus Solons (1889)

William M. George (also known as Bill George) (January 27, 1865 – August 23, 1916) was an American professional baseball player for the New York Giants and the Columbus Solons. He played with the Giants from 1887 to 1889, and played one year with the Columbus Solons of the American Association in 1889. He was born on January 27, 1865, in Bellaire, Ohio, and he died on August 23, 1916, in Wheeling, West Virginia. He is buried in the Mount Calvary Cemetery in Wheeling, West Virginia. He batted right-handed and threw left-handed.
