= Pat Murphy (catcher) =

American baseball player (1857–1927)

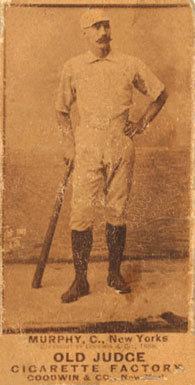
- Murphy in 1887
- Catcher
- Born: January 2, 1857; Auburn, Massachusetts, U.S.
- Died: May 16, 1927 (aged 70); Worcester, Massachusetts, U.S.
- Batted: Right Threw: Right

MLB debut
- September 2, 1887, for the New York Giants

Last MLB appearance
- October 3, 1890, for the New York Giants

MLB statistics
- Batting average: .220
- Home runs: 1
- Runs scored: 34
- Stats at Baseball Reference

Teams
- New York Giants (1887–1890)

Patrick J. Murphy (born January 2, 1857, in Auburn, Massachusetts – May 16, 1927, in Worcester, Massachusetts), was an American Major League Baseball catcher from 1887–1890. He played for the New York Giants.
