= The Chalfonte Hotel =

Hotel in Cape May, New Jersey

Coordinates: 38.9331°N 74.9179°W

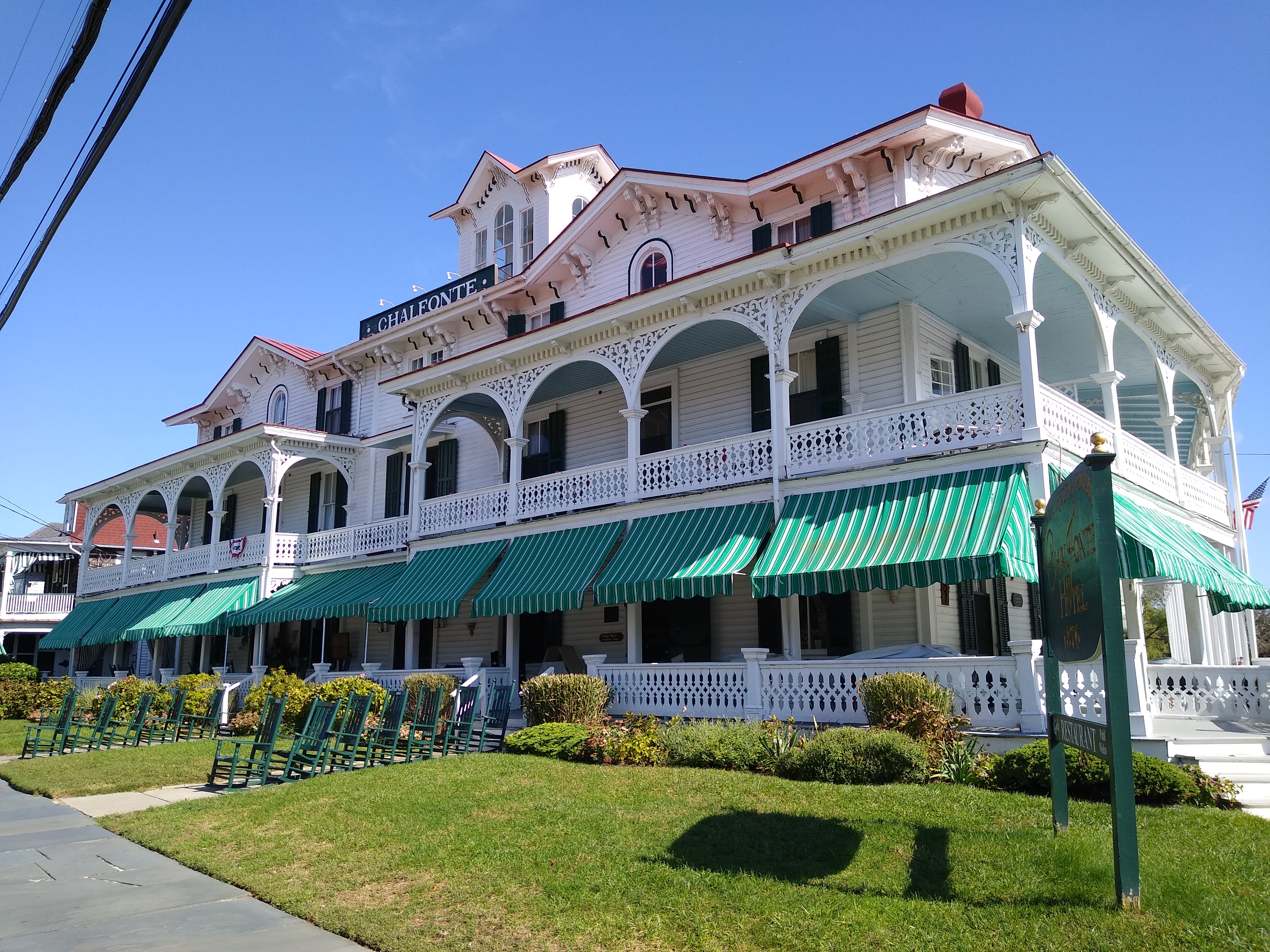
- The Chalfonte Hotel (September 2020)
- Interactive map of the The Chalfonte Hotel area

General information
- Location: 301 Howard St, Cape May, NJ 08204
- Opened: 1876
- Owner: Henry Sawyer (1876-1888); Satterfield family (1888-1878); Anne LeDuc, Judy Bartella (1978-2008); Robert and Linda Mullock (2008-present)

The Chalfonte Hotel is a hotel in Cape May, New Jersey. The National Park Service described it as the "Oldest and most ornate large hotel in Cape May". It is the oldest facility in the city to continually operate as a lodging facility. It is a contributing property in the Cape May Historic District, which was added to the National Register of Historic Places on December 29, 1970.

== History ==
Henry Sawyer built the hotel, which was built from 1875-1876, and opened as a boarding house.

The Philadelphia Phillies held spring training in Cape May in 1888, 1891, and 1898. In 1888 the Phillies stayed at the Chalfonte Hotel and practiced and played games games at the Cape May Athletic Park behind the hotel between Sewell and Benton Streets. The Phillies returned to Cape May in 1891 and 1898 but stayed at the Aldine Hotel on Decatur Street below Washington.

Anne de Luc owned the hotel until 2008, when she sold it to Robert Mullock.

Helen Dickerson, worked at the Chalfonte for 77 years, becoming the director of the hotel's kitchen and with her work ending with her death. Her daughter Lucille Thompson worked there for at least 80 years, since about 1936, also heading the kitchen. The hotel celebrated Lucille's 80th anniversary of working there.

== Facility and programs ==
Jacqueline K. Urgo of the Philadelphia Inquirer wrote that the Chalfonte "been likened to everything from a wedding cake to an ocean liner" and herself described it as "a time machine more than anything else."

The facility has three stories. Urgo described the railings as being "gingerbread" style, and she stated the porches in the facility are "ornate" and "stacked like decks of a ship."

As of 2008 the hotel has no air conditioning and common bathrooms serve the facility. In 2008 there was no Wi-Fi. Urgo stated that the owners chose not to "incorporate the high-end amenities". Circa 2008 Mullock deliberated how to establish private restrooms and air conditioning.

In 2009 the hotel had a volunteer program in which people voluntarily keep up the hotel in the off season.

== In culture ==
The publishing company Exit Zero published The Chalfonte, a collection of stories written by Karen Fox; de Luc asked Fox to write the book.
