= Gid Gardner =

American baseball player (1859–1914)

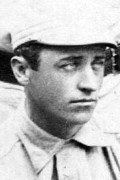
- Outfielder
- Born: May 6, 1859; Boston, Massachusetts, US
- Died: August 1, 1914 (aged 55); Cambridge, Massachusetts, US
- Batted: Right Threw: Unknown

MLB debut
- August 23, 1879, for the Troy Trojans

Last MLB appearance
- May 29, 1888, for the Washington Nationals

MLB statistics
- Batting average: .233
- Home runs: 4
- Runs scored: 113
- Stats at Baseball Reference

Teams
- Troy Trojans (1879); Cleveland Blues (1880); Baltimore Orioles (1883–1884); Chicago Browns/Pittsburgh Stogies (1884); Baltimore Monumentals (1884); Baltimore Orioles (1885); Indianapolis Hoosiers (1887); Washington Nationals (1888); Philadelphia Quakers (1888); Washington Nationals (1888)

Franklin Washington "Gid" Gardner (May 6, 1859 – August 1, 1914) was an American Major League Baseball player during the 19th century. Between 1879 and 1888, Gardner played all or part of seven seasons for eight different teams in three different major leagues. He appeared in 199 games, mostly as an outfielder, but also spent some time as a second baseman and pitcher. He had a career batting average of .233 and a pitching record of 2–12.

== Career ==
Gardner was born in Boston, Massachusetts, in 1859. He played on several amateur baseball teams in Cambridge until 1878. In 1879, he started his professional baseball career with the National Association's Worcester Grays, batting .188 in nine games. He then joined the National League's Troy Trojans and made his major league debut on August 23. He pitched in two games for Troy that year and lost both. The following season, Gardner played for the Cleveland Blues; he made nine starts, going 1–8 with a 2.57 earned run average.

Gardner spent 1881 in the Eastern Championship Association and 1882 in the League Alliance. He started 1883 with the Camden Merritts of the Interstate Association, but the team disbanded in July, and he was acquired by the American Association's Baltimore Orioles. Gardner was mostly an outfielder for Baltimore. Over the rest of the season, he played in 42 games and batted .273.

Gardner started 1884 with the Orioles. He played 41 games for them, batting .214, and then finished the season in the Union Association, batting .255 there. He returned to Baltimore in 1885 and hit .218 while playing mostly at second base. Gardner then went back down to the minors in 1886. He played 56 games for the Southern Association's Charleston Seagulls and batted .262. In 1887, he became captain of the New England League's Boston Blues, where he "reached the height of his fame," and also appeared in 18 games for the National League's Indianapolis Hoosiers. While at Indianapolis, Gardner became part of the first known platoon arrangement in baseball, as he split time with left-handed hitting Tom Brown. Gardner had a .175 batting average in his 18 games.

In October 1887, Gardner was traded to the Washington Nationals. He played one game for Washington before being traded in May 1888, to the Philadelphia Quakers, for Cupid Childs and cash. Gardner appeared in one game for Philadelphia, but Childs refused to report to the Nationals, and the trade was nullified. Gardner returned to Washington and played his final major league game on May 29.

In 1889, Gardner played for the Central Interstate League's Evansville Hoosiers. In early 1890, he signed with the John P. Lovell semi-professional team, and by August was with a team based in Norwich, Connecticut. Gardner then ended his professional baseball career the following season with Worcester of the New England League.

After his baseball days were over, Gardner lived in Cambridge and "had no steady employment." He was working as a traveling salesman when, in 1914, he was confined to the Cambridge Hospital for several weeks before dying of an aneurysm of the aorta. According to Gardner's obituary in Sporting Life, from 1878 until about 1890 he "was one of the best ball players in the country." Gardner was buried in Cambridge City Cemetery.
