= St. Louis Maroons/Indianapolis Hoosiers all-time roster =

List of baseball players

The following is a list of players and who appeared in at least one game for the St. Louis Maroons/Indianapolis Hoosiers franchise of the Union Association (1884 and National League (1885 through 1889).

- Note: This list does not include players for the Indianapolis Blues, who played in the NL in 1878, the Hoosiers that played in the American Association in 1884, or the Hoosiers that played in the Federal League in 1914, unless they also played for this incarnation of the Hoosiers.

== A ==
- Billy Alvord
- Varney Anderson
- Ed Andrews
- Tug Arundel

== B ==
- George Baker
- Charley Bassett
- Al Bauer
- Henry Boyle
- Jack Brennan
- Fatty Briody
- Tom Brown
- Dick Buckley
- Bill Burdick
- Dick Burns

== C ==
- John Cahill
- Ed Callahan
- Ed Caskin
- John Cattanach
- Red Connally
- Larry Corcoran
- Sam Crane
- Dan Cronin

== D ==
- Con Daily
- Hugh Daily
- Jerry Denny
- Buttercup Dickerson
- Tom Dolan
- Fred Dunlap

== E ==
- Dude Esterbrook

== F ==
- Jack Fanning
- Frederick Fass
- Jack Fee
- John Fogarty

== G ==
- Gid Gardner
- Charlie Getzien
- Jack Glasscock
- Jack Gleason
- Frank Graves

== H ==
- Mert Hackett
- John Healy
- Paul Hines
- Charlie Hodnett

== J ==
- Henry Jackson
- Bill Johnson

== K ==
- John Kirby
- Charlie Krehmeyer
- Gus Krock

== L ==
- Doc Leitner
- Fred Lewis

== M ==
- George Mappes
- C. V. Matteson
- Jack McGeachey
- Alex McKinnon
- Trick McSorley
- Sam Moffet
- Hank Morrison
- Joe Murphy
- George Myers

== P ==
- Billy Palmer
- Louis Pelouze
- Dick Phelan
- Mark Polhemus

== Q ==
- Joe Quinn

== R ==
- Jeremiah Reardon
- Dave Rowe
- Amos Rusie
- Tom Ryder

== S ==
- Jumbo Schoeneck
- Otto Schomberg
- Emmett Seery
- Orator Shaffer
- Lev Shreve
- Andy Sommers
- John Sowders
- Marty Sullivan
- Sleeper Sullivan
- William Sullivan
- Sy Sutcliffe
- Charlie Sweeney
- Rooney Sweeney

== T ==
- Billy Taylor

== W ==
- Pete Weckbecker
- Perry Werden
- Milt Whitehead
- Jim Whitney
