= 1887 Indianapolis Hoosiers season =

1887 Indianapolis Hoosiers
- League: National League
- Ballpark: Athletic Park
- City: Indianapolis, Indiana
- Record: 37–89 (.294)
- League place: 8th
- Owner: John T. Brush
- Managers: Watch Burnham, Fred Thomas, Horace Fogel

The 1887 Indianapolis Hoosiers finished with a 37–89 record in the National League, finishing in last place in their first season in Indianapolis. They had played the previous three seasons in St. Louis, Missouri as the Maroons.

== Offseason ==
Following the 1886 season, the Maroons franchise was purchased by the National League and subsequently sold to John T. Brush. On March 8, the Hoosiers additionally purchased a number of players who were under league control. Technically, these players were purchased from the Maroons franchise. Among these players were Henry Boyle, John Cahill, Jerry Denny, Jack Glasscock, Egyptian Healy, John Kirby, Jack McGeachey, George Myers, Otto Schomberg, and Emmett Seery.

=== Notable transactions ===
- March 9, 1887: The Hoosiers obtained Mert Hackett and Charley Bassett, who had been under league control, for $1,000.

== Regular season ==
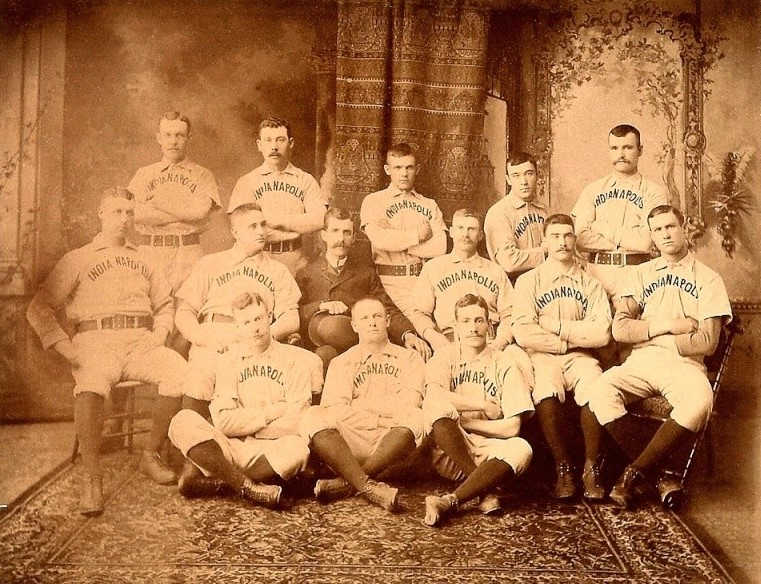
1887 Indianapolis Hoosiers

=== Season standings ===
National League
Team	W	L	Pct.	GB	Home	Road
Detroit Wolverines	79	45	.637	—	44‍–‍17	35‍–‍28
Philadelphia Quakers	75	48	.610	3½	38‍–‍23	37‍–‍25
Chicago White Stockings	71	50	.587	6½	44‍–‍18	27‍–‍32
New York Giants	68	55	.553	10½	36‍–‍26	32‍–‍29
Boston Beaneaters	61	60	.504	16½	38‍–‍22	23‍–‍38
Pittsburgh Alleghenys	55	69	.444	24	31‍–‍33	24‍–‍36
Washington Nationals	46	76	.377	32	26‍–‍33	20‍–‍43
Indianapolis Hoosiers	37	89	.294	43	24‍–‍39	13‍–‍50

=== Record vs. opponents ===
1887 National League record Sources:
Team	BSN	CHI	DET	IND	NYG	PHI	PIT	WAS
Boston	—	6–9–3	17–11–1	11–7	7–10–1	9–9	11–7	10–7–1
Chicago	9–6–3	—	10–8	13–5	11–6–1	12–6–1	5–12–1	11–7
Detroit	11–7–1	8–10	—	14–4–1	10–8	10–8	13–4	13–4–1
Indianapolis	7–11	5–13	4–14–1	—	3–15	1–17	7–11	10–8
New York	10–7–1	6–11–1	8–10	15–3	—	7–10–3	12–6	10–8–1
Philadelphia	9–9	6–12–1	8–10	17–1	10–7–3	—	12–6	13–3–1
Pittsburgh	7–11	12–5–1	4–13	11–7	6–12	6–12	—	9–9
Washington	7–10–1	7–11	4–13–1	8–10	8–10–1	3–13–1	9–9	—

=== Notable transactions ===
- July 2, 1887: John Kirby was sold by the Hoosiers to the Cleveland Blues for $800 to $1000.
- August 15, 1887: Lev Shreve was purchased by the Hoosiers from the Baltimore Orioles.
- August 19, 1887: Tom Brown was signed by the Hoosiers as a free agent.

=== Roster ===
1887 Indianapolis Hoosiers
Roster
Pitchers: Henry Boyle; Frederick Fass; Egyptian Healy; John Kirby; Doc Leitner; Sam Moffet; Hank Morrison; Lev Shreve	Catchers: Tug Arundel; Mert Hackett; George Myers; Infielders: Charley Bassett; Jerry Denny; Jack Glasscock; Henry Jackson; Otto Schomberg	Outfielders: Tom Brown; John Cahill; Larry Corcoran; Gid Gardner; Lefty Johnson; Jack McGeachey; Mark Polhemus; Emmett Seery; John Sowders	Manager: Watch Burnham; Fred Thomas; Horace Fogel

== Player stats ==
=== Batting ===
==== Starters by position ====
Note: Pos = Position; G = Games played; AB = At bats; H = Hits; Avg. = Batting average; HR = Home runs; RBI = Runs batted in

Pos	Player	G	AB	H	Avg.	HR	RBI
C	George Myers	69	235	51	.217	1	20
1B	Otto Schomberg	112	419	129	.308	5	83
2B	Charley Bassett	119	452	104	.230	1	47
3B	Jerry Denny	122	510	165	.324	11	97
SS	Jack Glasscock	122	483	142	.294	0	40
OF	Emmett Seery	122	465	104	.224	4	28
OF	Jack McGeachey	99	405	109	.269	1	56
OF	John Cahill	68	263	54	.205	0	26

==== Other batters ====
Note: G = Games played; AB = At bats; H = Hits; Avg. = Batting average; HR = Home runs; RBI = Runs batted in

Player	G	AB	H	Avg.	HR	RBI
Tug Arundel	43	157	31	.197	0	13
Mert Hackett	42	147	35	.238	2	10
Tom Brown	36	140	25	.179	2	9
Mark Polhemus	20	75	18	.240	0	8
Gid Gardner	18	63	11	.175	1	8
Lefty Johnson	11	42	8	.190	0	3
Henry Jackson	10	38	10	.263	0	3
Larry Corcoran	3	10	2	.200	0	0
John Sowders	1	2	0	.000	0	0

=== Pitching ===
==== Starting pitchers ====
Note: G = Games pitched; IP = Innings pitched; W = Wins; L = Losses; ERA = Earned run average; SO = Strikeouts

Player	G	IP	W	L	ERA	SO
Egyptian Healy	41	341.0	12	29	5.17	75
Henry Boyle	38	328.0	13	24	3.65	85
Lev Shreve	14	122.0	5	9	4.72	22
Doc Leitner	8	65.0	2	6	5.68	27
John Kirby	8	62.0	1	6	6.10	7
Hank Morrison	7	57.0	3	4	7.58	13
Sam Moffet	6	50.0	1	5	3.78	3
Larry Corcoran	2	15.0	0	2	12.60	4

==== Other pitchers ====
Note: G = Games pitched; IP = Innings pitched; W = Wins; L = Losses; ERA = Earned run average; SO = Strikeouts

Player	G	IP	W	L	ERA	SO
John Cahill	6	22.0	0	2	14.32	5
Frederick Fass	4	15.2	0	1	10.34	0

==== Relief pitchers ====
Note: G = Games pitched; W = Wins; L = Losses; SV = Saves; ERA = Earned run average; SO = Strikeouts

Player	G	W	L	SV	ERA	SO
Jack McGeachey	1	0	1	0	11.37	3
John Sowders	1	0	0	0	21.00	0
Jack Glasscock	1	0	0	0	0.00	1
