= List of managers of defunct Major League Baseball teams =

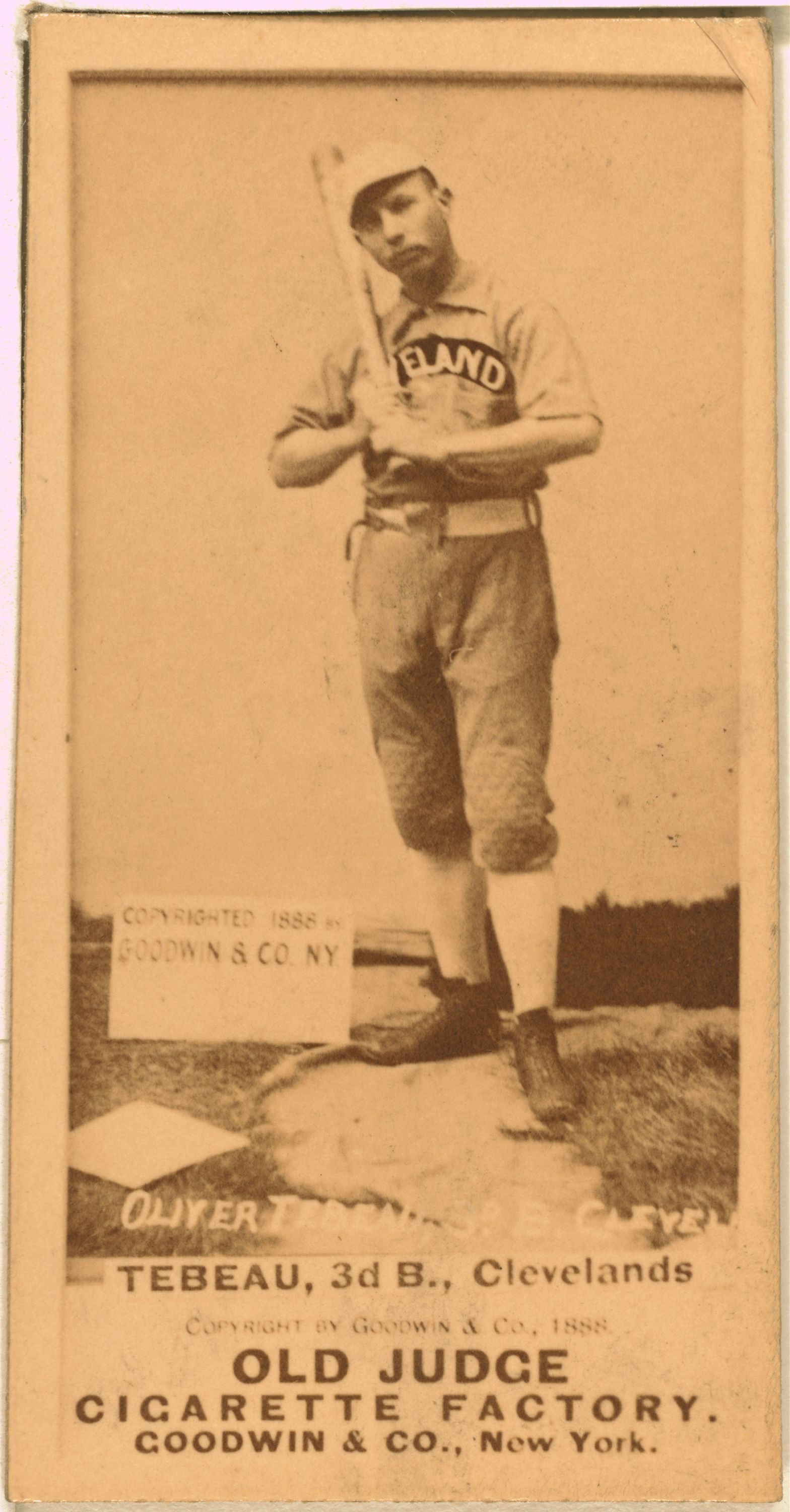
Patsy Tebeau won 579 games as manager of the Cleveland Spiders.

In Major League Baseball history, 65 teams have become defunct. These teams played in five different Major Leagues–the extant National League and the now defunct American Association, Union Association, Players' League and Federal League. Thirteen men who managed now-defunct Major League Baseball teams have been inducted into the Baseball Hall of Fame: Ned Hanlon, John McGraw, Jim O'Rourke, Pud Galvin, Fred Clarke, George Wright, John Montgomery Ward, Harry Wright, Charles Comiskey, Buck Ewing, Joe Tinker, Bill McKechnie and Mordecai Brown. Hanlon managed the National League Baltimore Orioles to three league championships. Eleven other managers managed now defunct teams to a single league championship: Bill Watkins, George Wright and Frank Bancroft in the National League, Arthur Irwin, Jack Chapman, Jim Mutrie and Lon Knight in the American Association, Fred Dunlap in the Union Association, King Kelly in the Players' League and Joe Tinker and Bill Phillips in the Federal League.

Patsy Tebeau's 579 wins with the National League Cleveland Spiders is more than any other manager won with any single defunct Major League Baseball team. His 1040 games managed and 436 losses with the Spiders are the most of any manager of a single defunct National League team. Billy Barnie's 1050 games managed and 548 losses with the American Association Baltimore Orioles are the most of any manager with a single defunct Major League team, and his 470 wins are the most of any manager of a defunct American Association team. Dunlap has the most managerial wins for a Union Association team, and King Kelly has the most wins for a Players' League team. Tinker has the most wins for a Federal League manager, and Otto Knabe has the most losses.

Chapman and Bancroft each managed six different now defunct Major League Baseball teams. Chapman managed the National League Louisville Grays, Milwaukee Grays, Worcester Worcesters, Detroit Wolverines and Buffalo Bisons, and the Louisville Colonels in both the American Association and the National League. He managed the Colonels to the 1890 American Association championship, and to a tie with the National League champion Brooklyn Bridegrooms in the 1890 World Series. Bancroft managed the National League Worcester Ruby Legs, Detroit Wolverines, Cleveland Blues, Providence Grays and Indianapolis Hoosiers and the American Association Philadelphia Athletics. He managed the Providence Grays to the 1884 National League and World Series championships.

== Table key ==
Team	Name of team. For teams that played under more than one name, the name used in its final season is given. For team names that were used by multiple defunct franchises, the league(s) in which the team played is shown in parentheses.
League	League the team played in: NL: National League; AA: American Association; FL: Federal League; UA: Union Association; PL: Players' League
G	Number of regular season games managed; may not equal sum of wins and losses due to tie games
W	Number of regular season wins in games managed
L	Number of regular season losses in games managed
WPct	Winning percentage: number of wins divided by number of games managed
LC	League Championships: number of League Championships, or pennants, achieved by the manager
WS	World Series: number of World Series victories achieved by the manager
†	Elected to the National Baseball Hall of Fame

== Managers ==
=== National League ===
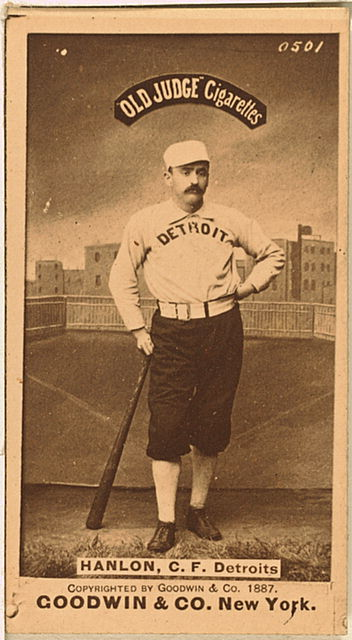
Ned Hanlon won 555 games and 3 National League championships as manager of the Baltimore Orioles.

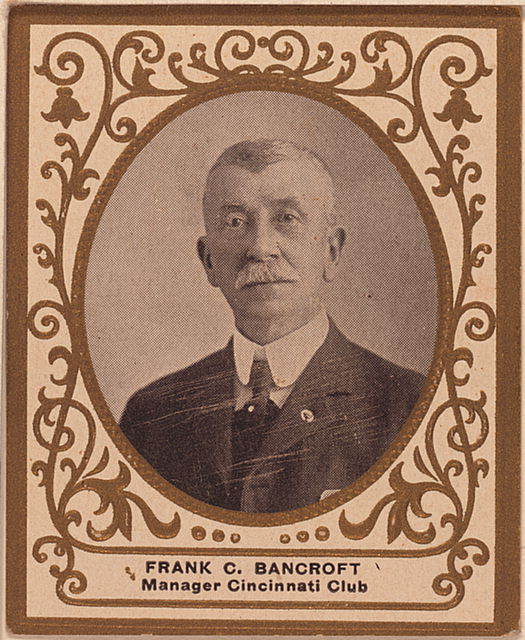
Frank Bancroft managed five different defunct National League baseball teams including the Providence Grays, whom he led to the 1884 National League and World Series championships.

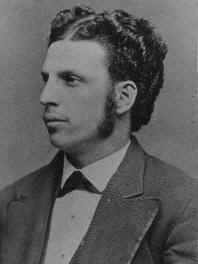
George Wright managed the 1879 Providence Grays to a .702 winning percentage and a National League championship.

Team	League	Manager	Seasons	G	W	L	WPct	LC	WS	Ref
Baltimore Orioles	NL	George Van Haltren	1892	11	1	10	.091	—	—	
Baltimore Orioles	NL	John Waltz	1892	8	2	6	.250	—	—	
Baltimore Orioles	NL	Ned Hanlon^{†}	1892–1898	946	555	369	.601	3	—	
Baltimore Orioles	NL	John McGraw^{†}	1899	152	86	62	.581	—	—	
Buffalo Bisons	NL	John Clapp	1879	79	46	32	.590	—	—	
Buffalo Bisons	NL	Sam Crane	1880	84	24	58	.293	—	—	
Buffalo Bisons	NL	Jim O'Rourke^{†}	1881–1884	380	206	169	.549	—	—	
Buffalo Bisons	NL	Pud Galvin^{†}	1885	24	7	17	.292	—	—	
Buffalo Bisons	NL	Jack Chapman	1885	88	31	57	.352	—	—	
Cincinnati Reds	NL	Charlie Gould	1876	65	9	56	.138	—	—	
Cincinnati Reds	NL	Lip Pike	1877	14	3	11	.214	—	—	
Cincinnati Reds	NL	Bob Addy	1877	24	5	19	.208	—	—	
Cincinnati Reds	NL	Jack Manning	1877	20	7	12	.368	—	—	
Cincinnati Reds	NL	Cal McVey	1878, 1879	124	71	51	.582	—	—	
Cincinnati Reds	NL	Deacon White	1879	18	9	9	.500	—	—	
Cincinnati Reds	NL	John Clapp	1880	82	21	59	.263	—	—	
Cleveland Blues	NL	Jim McCormick	1879–1880, 1882	171	74	96	.435	—	—	
Cleveland Blues	NL	Mike McGeary	1881	11	4	7	.364	—	—	
Cleveland Blues	NL	John Clapp	1881	74	32	41	.438	—	—	
Cleveland Blues	NL	Fred Dunlap	1882	80	42	36	.538	—	—	
Cleveland Blues	NL	Frank Bancroft	1883	100	55	42	.567	—	—	
Cleveland Blues	NL	Charlie Hackett	1884	113	35	77	.313	—	—	
Cleveland Spiders	NL	Tom Loftus^{[i]}	1889	136	61	72	.459	—	—	
Cleveland Spiders	NL	Gus Schmelz	1890	78	21	55	.276	—	—	
Cleveland Spiders	NL	Robert Leadley	1890–1891	126	57	67	.460	—	—	
Cleveland Spiders	NL	Patsy Tebeau	1891–1898	1040	579	436	.570	—	—	
Cleveland Spiders	NL	Lave Cross	1899	38	8	30	.211	—	—	
Cleveland Spiders	NL	Joe Quinn	1899	116	12	104	.103	—	—	
Detroit Wolverines	NL	Frank Bancroft	1881–1882	170	83	84	.497	—	—	
Detroit Wolverines	NL	Jack Chapman	1883–1884	215	68	142	.324	—	—	
Detroit Wolverines	NL	Charlie Morton	1885	38	7	31	.184	—	—	
Detroit Wolverines	NL	Bill Watkins	1885–1888	417	249	161	.607	1	1	
Detroit Wolverines	NL	Robert Leadley	1888	40	19	19	.500	—	—	
Hartford Dark Blues	NL	Bob Ferguson	1876–1877	129	78	48	.619	—	—	
Indianapolis Blues	NL	John Clapp	1878	63	24	36	.600	—	—	
Indianapolis Hoosiers	NL	Watch Burnham	1887	28	6	22	.214	—	—	
Indianapolis Hoosiers	NL	Fred Thomas	1887	29	11	18	.379	—	—	
Indianapolis Hoosiers	NL	Horace Fogel	1887	70	20	49	.290	—	—	
Indianapolis Hoosiers	NL	Harry Spence	1888	136	50	85	.370	—	—	
Indianapolis Hoosiers	NL	Frank Bancroft	1889	68	25	43	.368	—	—	
Indianapolis Hoosiers	NL	Jack Glasscock	1889	67	34	32	.515	—	—	
Kansas City Cowboys	NL	Dave Rowe	1886	126	30	91	.248	—	—	
Louisville Colonels	NL	Jack Chapman^{[j]}	1892	54	21	33	.389	—	—	
Louisville Colonels	NL	Fred Pfeffer	1892	100	42	56	.429	—	—	
Louisville Colonels	NL	Billy Barnie	1893–1894	257	86	169	.337	—	—	
Louisville Colonels	NL	John McCloskey	1895–1896	152	37	113	.247	—	—	
Louisville Colonels	NL	Bill McGunnigle	1896	115	36	76	.321	—	—	
Louisville Colonels	NL	Jim Rogers	1897	44	17	24	.415	—	—	
Louisville Colonels	NL	Fred Clarke^{†}	1897–1899	402	180	212	.459	—	—	
Louisville Grays	NL	Jack Chapman	1876–1877	130	65	61	.516	—	—	
Milwaukee Grays	NL	Jack Chapman	1878	61	15	45	.250	—	—	
New York Mutuals	NL	Bill Cammeyer	1876	57	21	35	.375	—	—	
Philadelphia Athletics	NL	Al Wright	1876	60	14	45	.237	—	—	
Providence Grays	NL	Tom York	1878, 1881	96	56	37	.602	—	—	
Providence Grays	NL	George Wright^{†}	1879	85	59	25	.702	1	—	
Providence Grays	NL	Mike McGeary	1880	16	8	7	.533	—	—	
Providence Grays	NL	John Montgomery Ward^{†}	1880	32	18	13	.581	—	—	
Providence Grays	NL	Mike Dorgan	1880	39	26	12	.684	—	—	
Providence Grays	NL	Jack Farrell	1881	51	24	27	.471	—	—	
Providence Grays	NL	Harry Wright^{†}	1882–1883	182	110	72	.604	—	—	
Providence Grays	NL	Frank Bancroft	1884–1885	224	137	85	.617	1	1	
St. Louis Brown Stockings	NL	Mase Graffen	1876	56	39	17	.696	—	—	
St. Louis Brown Stockings	NL	George McManus	1876–1877	68	34	34	.500	—	—	
St. Louis Maroons	NL	Fred Dunlap^{[h]}	1885	72	30	40	.429	—	—	
St. Louis Maroons	NL	Alex McKinnon	1885	39	6	32	.158	—	—	
St. Louis Maroons	NL	Gus Schmelz	1886	126	43	79	.352	—	—	
Syracuse Stars	NL	Mike Dorgan	1879	43	17	26	.395	—	—	
Syracuse Stars	NL	Bill Holbert	1879	1	0	1	.000	—	—	
Syracuse Stars	NL	Jimmy Macullar	1879	27	5	21	.192	—	—	
Troy Trojans	NL	Horace Phillips	1879	47	12	34	.261	—	—	
Troy Trojans	NL	Bob Ferguson	1879–1882	283	122	157	.437	—	—	
Washington Nationals	NL	Michael Scanlon	1886	82	13	67	.163	—	—	
Washington Nationals	NL	John Gaffney	1886–1887	169	61	101	.377	—	—	
Washington Nationals	NL	Walter Hewett	1888	40	10	29	.256	—	—	
Washington Nationals	NL	Ted Sullivan	1888	96	38	57	.400	—	—	
Washington Nationals	NL	John Morrill	1889	51	13	38	.255	—	—	
Washington Nationals	NL	Arthur Irwin	1889	76	28	45	.384	—	—	
Washington Senators	NL	Billy Barnie	1892	2	0	2	.000	—	—	
Washington Senators	NL	Arthur Irwin	1892, 1898–1899	203	110	177	.393	—	—	
Washington Senators	NL	Danny Richardson	1892	43	12	31	.279	—	—	
Washington Senators	NL	Jim O'Rourke^{†}	1893	130	40	89	.310	—	—	
Washington Senators	NL	Gus Schmelz	1894–1897	434	155	270	.365	—	—	
Washington Senators	NL	Tom Brown	1897–1898	137	64	72	.471	—	—	
Washington Senators	NL	Jack Doyle	1898	17	8	9	.471	—	—	
Washington Senators	NL	Deacon McGuire	1898	70	21	47	.309	—	—	
Worcester Worcesters	NL	Frank Bancroft	1880	85	40	43	.482	—	—	
Worcester Worcesters	NL	Mike Dorgan	1881	56	24	32	.429	—	—	
Worcester Worcesters	NL	Harry Stovey	1881	27	8	18	.308	—	—	
Worcester Worcesters	NL	Freeman Brown	1882	41	9	32	.220	—	—	
Worcester Worcesters	NL	Tommy Bond	1882	6	2	4	.333	—	—	
Worcester Worcesters	NL	Jack Chapman	1882	37	7	30	.189	—	—	

=== American Association ===
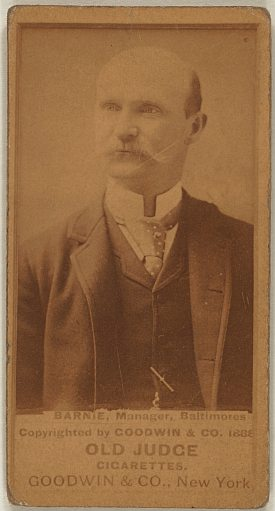
Billy Barnie won 470 games and lost 548 as manager of the Baltimore Orioles in the American Association.

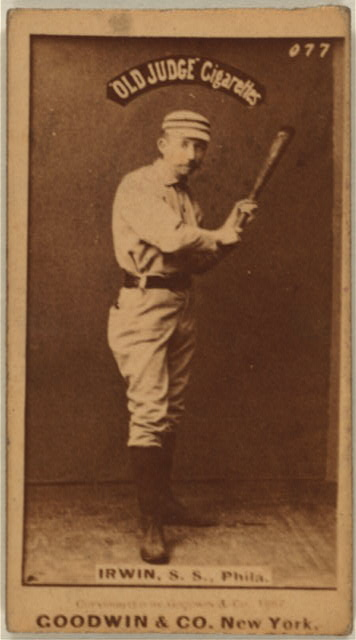
Arthur Irwin managed the Boston Reds to the last American Association championship in 1891.

Team	League	Manager	Seasons	G	W	L	WPct	LC	WS	Ref
Baltimore Orioles	AA	Henry Myers	1882	74	19	54	.260	—	—	
Baltimore Orioles	AA	Billy Barnie	1883–1891	1050	470	548	.462	—	—	
Boston Reds	AA	Arthur Irwin	1891	139	93	42	.689	1	—	
Brooklyn Gladiators	AA	Jim Kennedy	1890	100	26	73	.263	—	—	
Cincinnati Kelly's Killers	AA	King Kelly	1891	102	43	57	.430	—	—	
Cleveland Spiders^{[c]}	AA	Jimmy Williams	1887–1888	197	59	136	.303	—	—	
Cleveland Spiders^{[c]}	AA	Tom Loftus^{[i]}	1888	71	30	38	.441	—	—	
Columbus Buckeyes	AA	Horace Phillips	1883	97	32	65	.330	—	—	
Columbus Buckeyes	AA	Gus Schmelz	1884	110	69	39	.639	—	—	
Columbus Solons	AA	Al Buckenberger	1889–1890	220	99	119	.454	—	—	
Columbus Solons	AA	Gus Schmelz	1890, 1891	195	99	89	.527	—	—	
Columbus Solons	AA	Pat Sullivan	1890	3	2	1	.667	—	—	
Indianapolis Hoosiers	AA	Jim Gifford	1884	87	25	60	.294	—	—	
Indianapolis Hoosiers	AA	Bill Watkins	1884	23	4	18	.182	—	—	
Kansas City Cowboys	AA	Dave Rowe	1888	50	14	36	.280	—	—	
Kansas City Cowboys	AA	Sam Barkley	1888	58	21	36	.368	—	—	
Kansas City Cowboys	AA	Bill Watkins	1888–1889	164	63	99	.389	—	—	
Louisville Colonels^{[d]}	AA	Denny Mack	1882	80	42	38	.525	—	—	
Louisville Colonels^{[d]}	AA	Joe Gerhardt	1883	98	52	45	.536	—	—	
Louisville Colonels^{[d]}	AA	Mike Walsh	1884	110	68	40	.630	—	—	
Louisville Colonels	AA	Jim Hart	1885–1886	250	119	129	.480	—	—	
Louisville Colonels	AA	John Kelly	1887–1888	178	86	89	.491	—	—	
Louisville Colonels	AA	Mordecai Davidson	1888	93	35	54	.393	—	—	
Louisville Colonels	AA	John Kerins	1888	7	3	4	.429	—	—	
Louisville Colonels	AA	Dude Esterbrook	1889	10	2	8	.200	—	—	
Louisville Colonels	AA	Jimmy Wolf	1889	65	14	51	.215	—	—	
Louisville Colonels	AA	Dan Shannon	1889	58	10	46	.179	—	—	
Louisville Colonels	AA	Jack Chapman^{[j]}	1889–1891	282	143	133	.518	1	—	
Milwaukee Brewers	AA	Charlie Cushman	1891	36	21	15	.583	—	—	
New York Metropolitans	AA	Jim Mutrie	1883–1884	209	129	74	.635	1	—	
New York Metropolitans	AA	Jim Gifford	1885–1886	125	42	76	.392	—	—	
New York Metropolitans	AA	Bob Ferguson	1886–1887	150	54	94	.365	—	—	
New York Metropolitans	AA	Dave Orr	1887	8	3	5	.375	—	—	
New York Metropolitans	AA	O. P. Caylor	1887	100	35	60	.368	—	—	
Philadelphia Athletics (American Association)	AA	Juice Latham	1882	75	41	34	.547	—	—	
Philadelphia Athletics (American Association)	AA	Lon Knight	1883–1884	207	127	78	.620	1	—	
Philadelphia Athletics (American Association)	AA	Harry Stovey	1885	113	55	57	.491	—	—	
Philadelphia Athletics (American Association)	AA	Lew Simmons	1886	98	41	55	.427	—	—	
Philadelphia Athletics (American Association)	AA	Bill Sharsig	1886, 1888–1890	448	232	205	.531	—	—	
Philadelphia Athletics (American Association)	AA	Frank Bancroft	1887	55	26	29	.473	—	—	
Philadelphia Athletics (AA)	AA	Charlie Mason	1887	82	38	40	.487	—	—	
Philadelphia Athletics (PL/AA)	AA	Bill Sharsig	1891	18	6	11	.353	—	—	
Philadelphia Athletics (PL/AA)	AA	George Wood	1891	125	67	55	.549	—	—	
Richmond Virginians	AA	Felix Moses	1884	46	12	30	.286	—	—	
Rochester Broncos	AA	Pat Powers	1890	133	63	63	.500	—	—	
Syracuse Stars	AA	George Frazer	1890	117	51	65	.440	—	—	
Syracuse Stars	AA	Wallace Fessenden	1890	11	4	11	.364	—	—	
Toledo Blue Stockings	AA	Charlie Morton	1884	110	46	58	.442	—	—	
Toledo Maumees	AA	Charlie Morton	1884	134	68	64	.515	—	—	
Washington Nationals	AA	Holly Hollingshead	1884	62	12	50	.194	—	—	
Washington Nationals	AA	John Bickerton	1884	1	0	1	.000	—	—	
Washington Senators^{[f]}	AA	Sam Trott	1891	12	4	7	.364	—	—	
Washington Senators^{[f]}	AA	Pop Snyder	1891	70	23	46	.333	—	—	
Washington Senators^{[f]}	AA	Dan Shannon	1891	51	15	34	.306	—	—	
Washington Senators^{[f]}	AA	Sandy Griffin	1891	6	2	4	.333	—	—	

=== Union Association ===
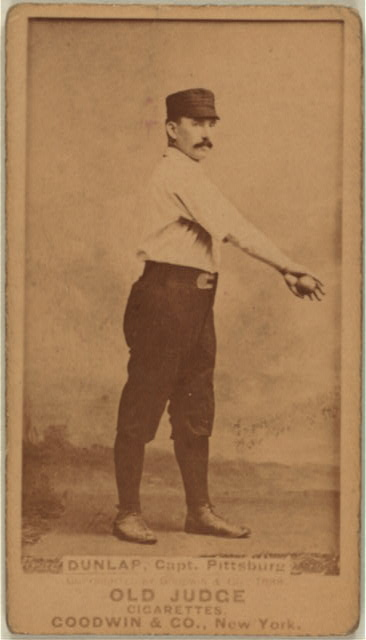
Fred Dunlap managed the St. Louis Maroons to the only Union Association championship.

Team	League	Manager	Seasons	G	W	L	WPct	LC	WS	Ref
Altoona Mountain City	UA	Ed Curtis	1884	25	6	19	.240	—	—	
Baltimore Monumentals	UA	Bill Henderson	1884	106	58	47	.552	—	—	
Boston Reds	UA	Tim Murnane	1884	111	58	51	.628	—	—	
Chicago Browns/Pittsburgh Stogies	UA	Ed Hengel	1884	74	34	39	.466	—	—	
Chicago Browns/Pittsburgh Stogies	UA	Joe Battin	1884	6	1	5	.167	—	—	
Chicago Browns/Pittsburgh Stogies	UA	Joe Ellick	1884	13	6	6	.500	—	—	
Cincinnati Outlaw Reds	UA	Dan O'Leary	1884	35	20	15	.571	—	—	
Cincinnati Outlaw Reds	UA	Sam Crane	1884	70	49	21	.700	—	—	
Kansas City Cowboys	UA	Harry Wheeler	1884	4	0	4	.000	—	—	
Kansas City Cowboys	UA	Matthew Porter	1884	16	3	13	.000	—	—	
Kansas City Cowboys	UA	Ted Sullivan	1884	62	13	46	.220	—	—	
Milwaukee Brewers	UA	Tom Loftus	1884	12	8	4	.667	—	—	
Philadelphia Keystones	UA	Fergy Malone	1884	67	21	46	.313	—	—	
St. Louis Maroons	UA	Ted Sullivan	1884	31	28	3	.903	—^{[g]}	—	
St. Louis Maroons	UA	Fred Dunlap^{[h]}	1884	83	66	16	.805	1	—	
St. Paul Saints	UA	Andrew Thompson	1884	9	2	6	.250	—	—	
Washington Nationals	UA	Mike Scanlon	1884	114	47	65	.420	—	—	
Wilmington Quicksteps	UA	Joe Simmons	1884	18	2	16	.111	—	—	

=== Players' League ===
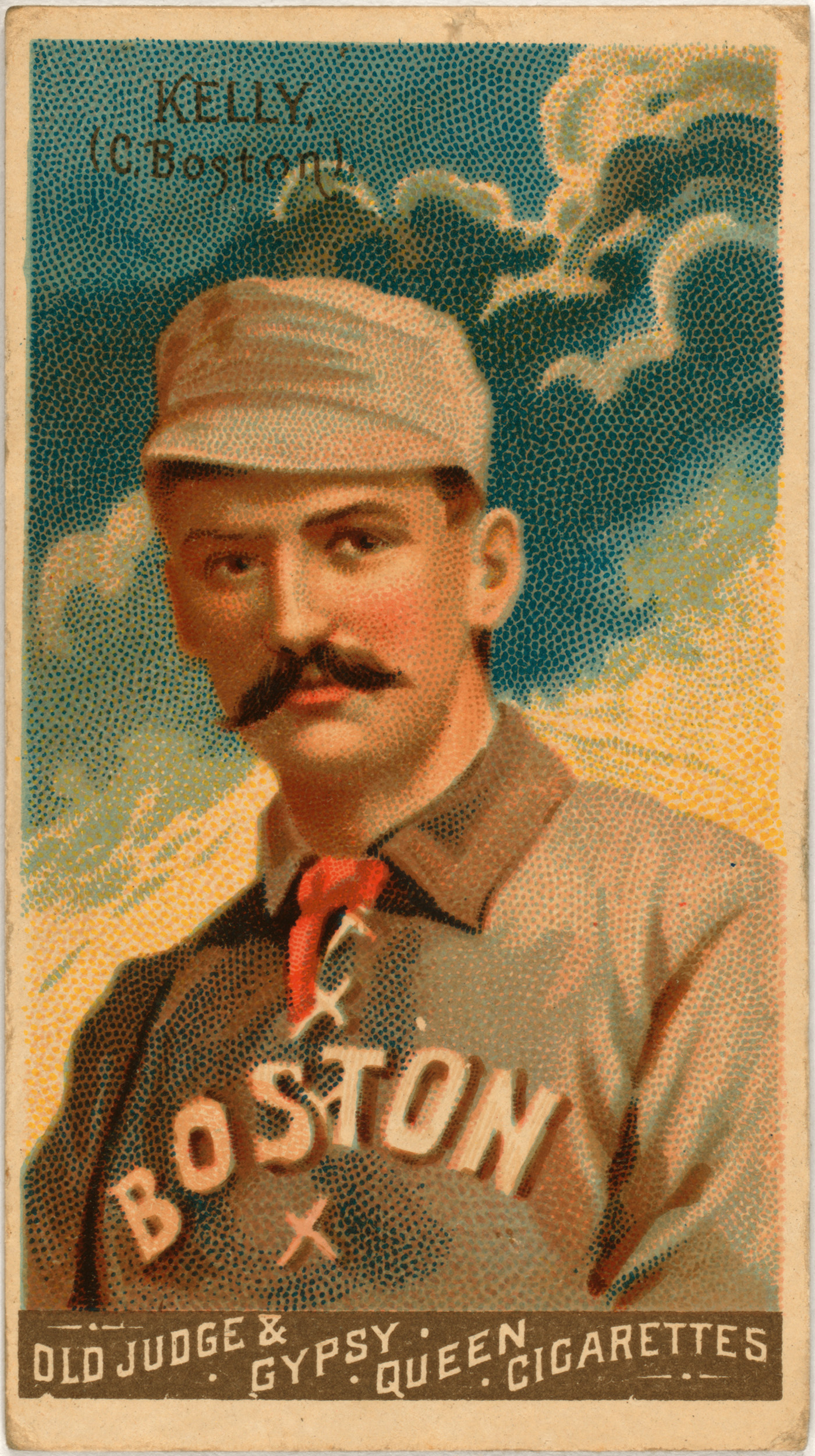
King Kelly managed the Boston Reds to the only Players' League championship.

Team	League	Manager	Seasons	G	W	L	WPct	LC	WS	Ref
Boston Reds	PL	King Kelly	1890	133	81	48	.628	1	—	
Brooklyn Ward's Wonders	PL	John Montgomery Ward^{†}	1890	133	76	56	.576	—	—	
Buffalo Bisons	PL	Jack Rowe	1890	100	27	72	.273	—	—	
Buffalo Bisons	PL	Jay Faatz	1890	34	9	24	.273	—	—	
Chicago Pirates	PL	Charles Comiskey^{†}	1890	138	75	62	.547	—	—	
Cleveland Infants	PL	Henry Larkin	1890	79	34	45	.430	—	—	
Cleveland Infants	PL	Patsy Tebeau	1890	52	21	30	.412	—	—	
New York Giants	PL	Buck Ewing^{†}	1890	132	74	57	.565	—	—	
Philadelphia Athletics (PL/AA)	PL	Jim Fogarty	1890	16	7	9	.438	—	—	
Philadelphia Athletics (PL/AA)	PL	Charlie Buffinton	1890	116	61	54	.530	—	—	
Pittsburgh Burghers	PL	Ned Hanlon^{†}	1890	131	60	68	.469	—	—	

=== Federal League ===
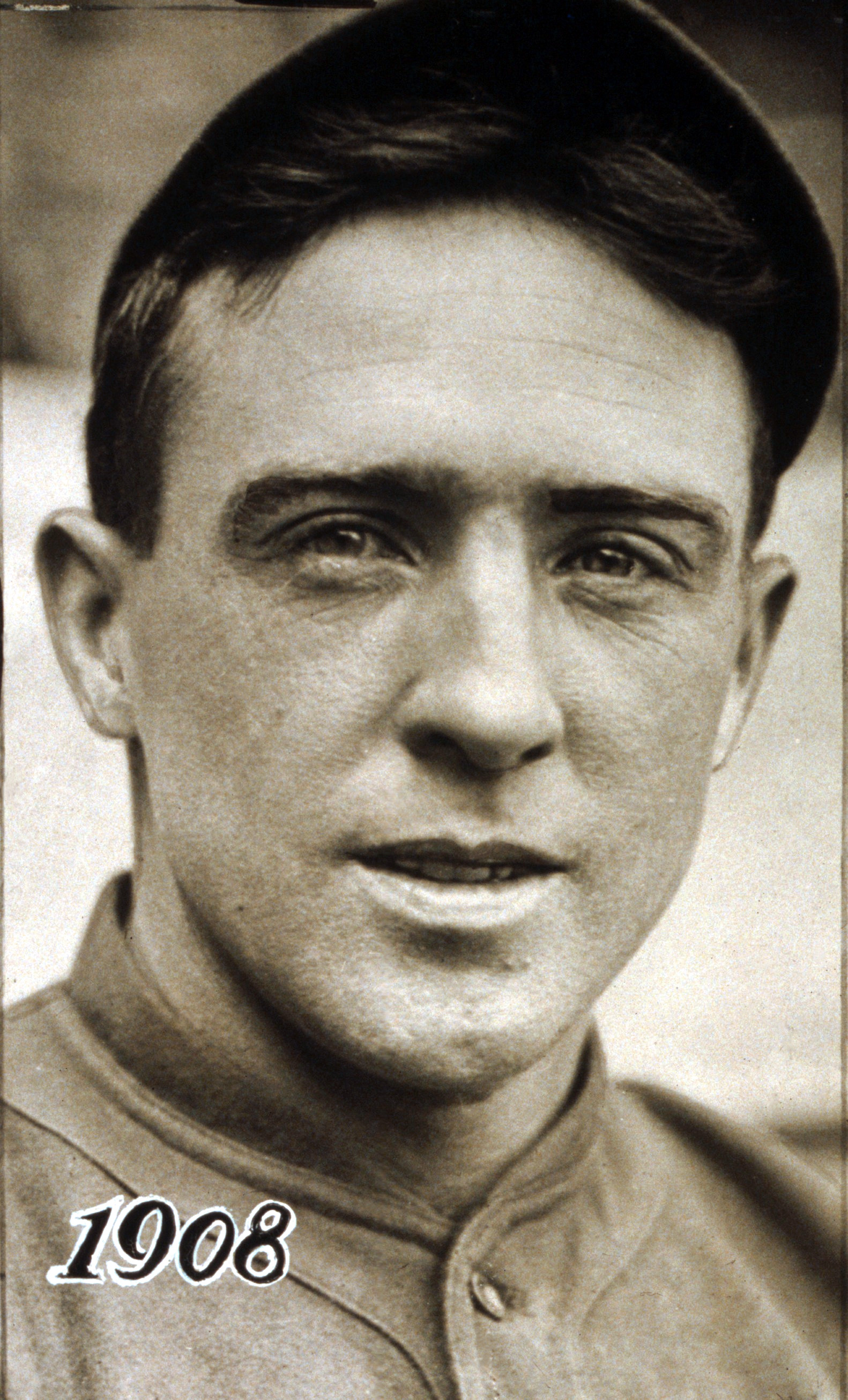
Joe Tinker managed the Chicago Whales to 173 wins and one Federal League championship.

Team	League	Manager	Seasons	G	W	L	WPct	LC	WS	Ref
Baltimore Terrapins	FL	Otto Knabe	1914–1915	315	131	177	.425	—	—	
Brooklyn Tip-Tops	FL	Bill Bradley	1914	157	77	77	.500	—	—	
Brooklyn Tip-Tops	FL	Lee Magee	1915	118	53	64	.453	—	—	
Brooklyn Tip-Tops	FL	John Ganzel	1915	35	17	18	.486	—	—	
Buffalo Blues^{[a]}	FL	Larry Schlafly	1914–1915	197	93	99	.484	—	—	
Buffalo Blues	FL	Walter Blair	1915	2	1	1	.500	—	—	
Buffalo Blues	FL	Harry Lord	1915	110	60	49	.550	—	—	
Chicago Whales^{[b]}	FL	Joe Tinker^{†}	1914–1915	314	173	133	.564	1	—	
Kansas City Packers	FL	George Stovall	1914–1915	307	148	156	.487	—	—	
Newark Peppers^{[e]}	FL	Bill Phillips	1914–1915	210	114	92	.553	1	—	
Newark Peppers	FL	Bill McKechnie^{†}	1915	102	54	45	.545	—	—	
Pittsburgh Rebels	FL	Doc Gessler	1914	11	3	11	.273	—	—	
Pittsburgh Rebels	FL	Rebel Oakes	1914–1915	299	147	145	.503	—	—	
St. Louis Terriers	FL	Mordecai Brown^{†}	1914	114	50	63	.442	—	—	
St. Louis Terriers	FL	Fielder Jones	1914–1915	199	99	93	.516	—	—	

== Footnotes ==
- ^{a} Team played as the Buffalo Buffeds in 1914.
- ^{b} Team played as the Chicago Chi-Feds in 1914.
- ^{c} Team played as the Cleveland Blues during its time in the American Association in 1887 and 1888.
- ^{d} Team played as the Louisville Eclipse from 1882 through 1884.
- ^{e} Team played as the Indianapolis Hoosiers in 1914.
- ^{f} Team played as the Washington Statesmen during its time in the American Association in 1891.
- ^{g} Ted Sullivan was the Union Association pennant winning Maroons' first manager in 1884, but was replaced by Fred Dunlap after leading the Maroons to 28 wins and 3 losses. Since Dunlap finished the season as the Maroons' manager, he is shown as having won the league championship as manager that season.
- ^{h} Fred Dunlap managed the St. Louis Maroons in both the Union Association and the National League. His combined record for the Maroons was 155 games managed with 96 wins and 56 losses for a winning percentage of .632. He led the Maroons to one league championship, in the Union Association in 1884.
- ^{i} Tom Loftus managed the Cleveland Spiders (known as the Cleveland Blues in 1888) in both the American Association and the National League. His combined record for the Blues/Spiders was 207 games managed with 91 wins and 110 losses for a winning percentage of .453.
- ^{j} Jack Chapman managed the Louisville Colonels in both the American Association and the National League. His combined record for the Colonels was 336 games managed with 164 wins and 166 losses for a winning percentage of .497. He led the Colonels to one league championship, in the American Association in 1890. The Colonels played to a tie against the National League champion Brooklyn Bridegrooms in the 1890 World Series.
