= Charlie Cushman =

American baseball umpire and manager

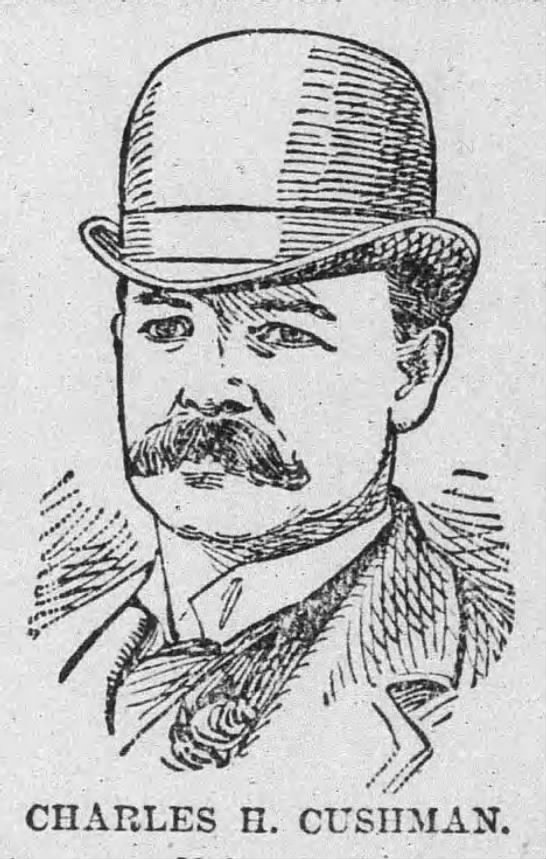
- Cushman as shown in 1891 in The Allen County Democrat
- Manager
- Born: May 25, 1850; New York, New York, U.S.
- Died: June 29, 1909 (aged 59); Milwaukee, Wisconsin, U.S.
- Batted: Unknown Threw: Unknown

MLB statistics
- Games managed: 36
- Win–loss record: 21–15 (.583)
- Games umpired: 110

Teams
- Milwaukee Brewers (1891)

Charles H. Cushman (May 25, 1850 – June 29, 1909) was an American professional baseball umpire and manager in the late 19th century. In parts of three seasons, he umpired a total of 110 National League games. Late in the 1891 season, he managed a replacement team, the Milwaukee Brewers, in the major-league American Association.

== Baseball career ==
=== Managing ===
Cushman managed the minor-league Milwaukee Brewers of the Northwestern League during part of the 1884 season. He later managed another minor-league Milwaukee Brewers team in the Western Association during 1890 and 1891. That team served as a replacement team in the major-league American Association late in the 1891 season. He led the major-league Brewers to a 21–15 record in 36 games that season.

=== Umpiring ===
In May 1884, after umpiring a St. Paul at Fort Wayne game in the Northwestern League, Cushman was struck in the head with a rock thrown by an eleven-year-old boy.

Cushman later umpired in the National League: 46 games in 1885, one game in 1894, and 63 games in 1898. In 1898, he umpired until July. Initial rumors were that Cushman was having problems with league president Nicholas Young. Later, Cushman said that he was discharged after refusing to attest to an affidavit incriminating managers Cap Anson and Patsy Tebeau of violating the league's prohibition on obscene or vulgar language (the "Brush law", named after owner John T. Brush). Cushman joined the staff of the Western League late in the season.

== Personal life ==
Cushman died in June 1909, aged 59, after being ill for six months following an injury at the railroad yard where he worked. He was survived by his wife and a daughter.

== See also ==
- List of managers of defunct Major League Baseball teams
