= St. Joseph Cemetery, Fleming =

Catholic cemetery in Fleming, New York

Coordinates: 42°54′18″N 76°32′57″W

St. Joseph Cemetery
- Interactive map of St. Joseph Cemetery

Details
- Location: 6020 Lake Avenue; Auburn, New York
- Country: United States
- No. of interments: >38,000
- Website: http://stjosephscemetery.org/
- Find a Grave: 248890

St. Joseph Cemetery (or St. Joseph's Cemetery) is a Catholic cemetery located just outside Auburn, New York in the town of Fleming, New York. Former big league baseball player Tug Arundel is buried there.
