= William Sullivan (pitcher) =

American baseball player (1864–1911)

- Pitcher and Outfielder
- Born: March 12, 1864; St. Louis
- Died: September 27, 1911 (aged 47); St. Louis
- Batted: Unknown Threw: Unknown

MLB debut
- May 29, 1884, for the St. Louis Maroons

Last MLB appearance
- May 29, 1884, for the St. Louis Maroons

MLB statistics
- Win–loss record: 1–0
- Strikeouts: 3
- Earned run average: 4.50
- Stats at Baseball Reference

Teams
- St. Louis Maroons (1884)

William F. Sullivan (March 12, 1864 – September 27, 1911) was a professional baseball player. He appeared in one game in Major League Baseball for the St. Louis Maroons of the Union Association in 1884.
