= Joe Moffet =

American baseball player (1859–1935)

- First baseman
- Born: June 27, 1859; Wheeling, Virginia, U.S.
- Died: February 24, 1935 (aged 75); San Bernardino, California, U.S.
- Batted: Unknown Threw: Unknown

MLB debut
- May 6, 1884, for the Toledo Blue Stockings

Last MLB appearance
- August 10, 1884, for the Toledo Blue Stockings

MLB statistics
- At bats: 204
- Home runs: 0
- Batting average: .201
- Stats at Baseball Reference

Teams
- Toledo Blue Stockings (1884)

Joseph William Moffet (June 27, 1859 – February 24, 1935) was an American professional baseball player who played first base in the American Association for the 1884 Toledo Blue Stockings. His brother, Sam Moffet, also played professional baseball.
