= Fred Thomas (baseball manager) =

American baseball manager

- Manager
- Born: Indiana

MLB statistics
- Games managed: 29
- Win–loss record: 11–18
- Winning %: .379

Teams
- Indianapolis Hoosiers (1887)

Frederick L. Thomas was a professional baseball manager.

In June 1887, Thomas was named manager for the Indianapolis Hoosiers of the National League. Thomas, who had front office duties with the team, took over from Watch Burnham after the team got off to a 6–22 start. Thomas had a managerial record of 11–18, before he was replaced by Horace Fogel in July. Accruing a record of 20–49 under Fogel, the 1887 Indianapolis Hoosiers finished the season at 37–89.

== Notes ==
Little is known about Thomas; research suggests he may be Frederick Lucius Thomas, who was born in Indianapolis on July 31, 1855, and died in Los Angeles on this 78th birthday (July 31, 1933).
