= Mert Hackett =

American baseball player (1859–1938)

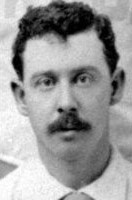
- Catcher
- Born: November 11, 1859; Cambridge, Massachusetts, U.S.
- Died: February 22, 1938 (aged 78); Cambridge, Massachusetts, U.S.
- Batted: Right Threw: Right

MLB debut
- May 2, 1883, for the Boston Beaneaters

Last MLB appearance
- October 6, 1887, for the Indianapolis Hoosiers

MLB statistics
- Games played: 256
- Hits: 203
- Batting average: .216
- Stats at Baseball Reference

Teams
- Boston Beaneaters (1883–1885); Kansas City Cowboys (1886); Indianapolis Hoosiers (1887)

Mortimer Martin "Mert" Hackett (November 11, 1859 – February 22, 1938) was an American professional baseball catcher. He played in Major League Baseball from 1883 to 1887 for the Boston Beaneaters, Kansas City Cowboys, and Indianapolis Hoosiers. His older brother, Walter Hackett, and cousins Walter Clarkson, Dad Clarkson and Baseball Hall of Famers John Clarkson, Tim Keefe and Joe Kelley (all born in Cambridge, Massachusetts) also played in the majors.

== Biography ==
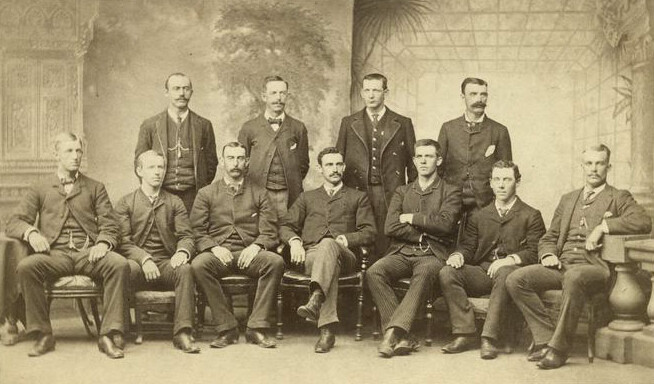
Team photograph of the 1883 National League champion Boston Beaneaters. Hackett is seated, second from the right.

A native of Cambridge, Massachusetts, Hackett made his major league debut with the 1883 Boston Beaneaters. He played in 46 of the team's 98 games, and batted .235 with 24 RBI in helping to lead the team to the National League pennant. He remained with Boston through the 1885 season, then spent 1886 with the National League's Kansas City Cowboys in their only season in the league. In 1887, Hackett's final big league campaign, he played for the Indianapolis Hoosiers in that club's first of three National League seasons. Over five major league seasons, Hackett played in 256 games, batting .216 with eight home runs and 83 RBI, and a .921 fielding percentage in 241 games at catcher.

From 1888 to 1891, he played for the Hyannis town team in what is now the Cape Cod Baseball League. The team was run by Charles Barney Cory and Charles Richard Crane, and featured other major leaguers such as Dick Conway and Barney Gilligan.

Hackett died in his hometown of Cambridge in 1938 at the age of 78, and is interred at St. Paul Cemetery in Arlington, Massachusetts. His brother, Walter, named one of his sons Mortimer Martin Hackett after him.
