= Harry Spence =

Harrison Spence
- Manager
- Born: February 22, 1856; New York City, New York, US
- Died: May 17, 1908 (aged 52); Chicago, Illinois, US
- Batted: Unknown Threw: Unknown

MLB statistics
- Managerial W–L: 50-85
- Games: 136
- Winning percentage: .370
- Stats at Baseball Reference
- Managerial record at Baseball Reference

Teams
- Indianapolis Hoosiers (1888)

Harrison L. Spence (February 22, 1856 – May 17, 1908) was an American professional baseball player and manager. He managed the Indianapolis Hoosiers of the National League in 1888, leading the team to 50 wins, with 85 losses, in 136 games.

Spence also played and managed in minor league baseball. His playing career began in 1877, being interrupted in 1888 and resuming for one final season in 1889. In 1885, he served as player-manager of the Toronto club in the Canadian League. He returned to manage one final season in 1899 with the Portland Phenoms of the New England League before retiring.

== See also ==
- List of managers of defunct Major League Baseball teams
