= Tug Arundel =

American baseball player (1862–1912)

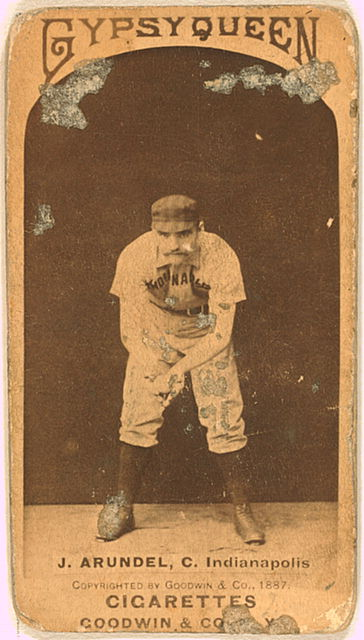
- Catcher
- Born: June 30, 1862; Romulus, New York, U.S.
- Died: September 5, 1912 (aged 50); Auburn, New York, U.S.
- Batted: Unknown Threw: Right

MLB debut
- May 23, 1882, for the Philadelphia Athletics

Last MLB appearance
- September 27, 1888, for the Washington Nationals

MLB statistics
- Batting average: .173
- Home runs: 0
- RBI: 16
- Stats at Baseball Reference

Teams
- Philadelphia Athletics (1882); Toledo Blue Stockings (1884); Indianapolis Hoosiers (1887); Washington Nationals (1888)

John Thomas "Tug" Arundel (June 30, 1862 – September 5, 1912) was an American Major League Baseball catcher born in Romulus, New York. He played in parts of four seasons between 1882 and 1888 with four teams.

== Career ==
He made his debut at the age of 19 in 1882, playing in one game for the Philadelphia Athletics on May 23, and went hitless in five at bats. Two years later he played sparingly for the Toledo Blue Stockings, the team that included the first African-American major league baseball players, Fleetwood and Welday Walker. It wasn't until 1887 that he received significant playing time, when he hit .197 in 157 at-bats for the Indianapolis Hoosiers. Overall, he played in 76 career games, collecting 45 hits in 260 at-bats for a .173 batting average. He hit four doubles, one triple and no home runs in his career.

He died at the age of 50 from the effects of paralysis in Auburn, New York, and is interred there at St. Joseph Cemetery.
