= Egyptian Healy =

American baseball player (1866–1899)

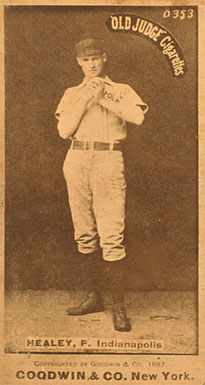
- Pitcher
- Born: October 27, 1866; Cairo, Illinois, U.S.
- Died: March 16, 1899 (aged 32); St. Louis, Missouri, U.S.
- Batted: Right Threw: Right

MLB debut
- September 11, 1885, for the St. Louis Maroons

Last MLB appearance
- July 6, 1892, for the Louisville Colonels

MLB statistics
- Win–loss record: 78-136
- Earned run average: 3.84
- Strikeouts: 822
- Stats at Baseball Reference

Teams
- St. Louis Maroons (1885–1886); Indianapolis Hoosiers (1887–1888); Washington Nationals (1889); Chicago White Stockings (1889); Toledo Maumees (1890); Baltimore Orioles (1891–1892); Louisville Colonels (1892)

John J. Healy (October 27, 1866 – March 16, 1899), nicknamed "Egyptian" and "Long John", was an American pitcher in Major League Baseball. Healy played for the St. Louis Maroons, Indianapolis Hoosiers, Washington Nationals, Chicago White Stockings, Toledo Maumees, Baltimore Orioles, and Louisville Colonels from 1885 to 1892. He was 6 feet 2 inches (1.88 m) tall and weighed 158 pounds (72 kg).

== Career ==
Healy was born in Cairo, Illinois, which earned him the "Egyptian" nickname, in 1866. He joined the National League's St. Louis Maroons in 1885 and made his Major League debut on September 11 against the Chicago White Stockings, at the age of 18. He made eight starts late in the season, going 1–7 with a 3.00 earned run average.

In 1886, Healy pitched 353.2 innings and went 17–23 with a 2.88 ERA. He led the Maroons' pitchers in innings pitched and wins. Healy, whose key pitch was the fastball, also finished among the league's top 10 in strikeouts (213), bases on balls (118), and wild pitches (40).

Healy was purchased by the Indianapolis Hoosiers on March 8, 1887. That season, he was the ace of the Indianapolis pitching staff and finished with a record of 12–29. His 29 losses were the most of any pitcher in the NL. Healy also went on an "around-the-world" tour with other American baseball players that year, playing exhibition games in Europe, Asia, and Australia. When Healy returned home, the mayor of his hometown honored him with "a special ceremony and a pin."

After going 12–24 in 1888, Healy was traded to the Washington Nationals for Jim Whitney. Healy started 12 games for Washington, going 1–11 with a 6.24 ERA before being released on July 8. He signed with the Chicago White Stockings three days later and went 1–4 for them before being released again. During the 1880s, Healy had an overall win–loss record of 44–98; his .310 winning percentage was the lowest of any Major League pitcher in the decade.

Healy spent 1890 with the Toledo Maumees of the American Association. Once again, he led his team in innings pitched (389) and wins (22), setting career-highs in both categories. He had a winning record for the only time in his career, and he finished fourth in the AA with 225 strikeouts.

In 1891, Healy was sold to the Baltimore Orioles. He compiled a record of 8–10 that season and 3–6 the next before Baltimore released him. Healy then finished his Major League career by playing one month for the Louisville Colonels. He had a career win–loss record of 78–136, and in 2004, baseball historian Bill James wrote that he was the fifth-unluckiest pitcher of all time in regards to his record.

Healy played for the minor league Minneapolis Millers in 1895 and 1896. He then retired from the game and worked as a St. Louis policeman before becoming ill. On March 16, 1899, Healy died of consumption in St. Louis. He was buried in Calvary Cemetery.
