= Doc Leitner =

American baseball player (1865–1937)

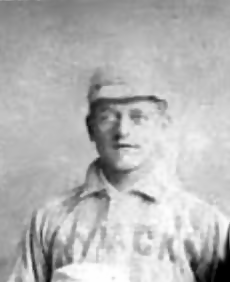
- Pitcher
- Born: September 14, 1865; Piermont, New York, U.S.
- Died: May 18, 1937 (aged 71); New York, New York, U.S.
- Batted: Right Threw: Right

MLB debut
- August 10, 1887, for the Indianapolis Hoosiers

Last MLB appearance
- September 17, 1887, for the Indianapolis Hoosiers

MLB statistics
- Win–loss record: 2–6
- Strikeouts: 27
- Earned run average: 5.68
- Stats at Baseball Reference

Teams
- Indianapolis Hoosiers (1887)

George Aloysius Leitner (September 14, 1865 – May 18, 1937) was an American professional baseball player who played pitcher in the Major Leagues for the 1887 Indianapolis Hoosiers of the National League. He played college baseball at Fordham University and New York University. The year before leaving for the major league, in 1886 he was pitcher at the Nyack Baseball, in Rockland County, New York.

In March 1888, he graduated in medicine from Bellevue Hospital Medical College, leaving his baseball career.
