= Frederick Fass =

American baseball player (1859–1930)

- Pitcher
- Born: October 30, 1859; Milwaukee, Wisconsin
- Died: July 5, 1930 (aged 70); Burnt Mill, Colorado
- Batted: Unknown Threw: Unknown

MLB debut
- July 11, 1887, for the Indianapolis Hoosiers

Last MLB appearance
- July 29, 1887, for the Indianapolis Hoosiers

MLB statistics
- Win–loss record: 0–1
- Earned run average: 10.34
- Strikeouts: 0
- Stats at Baseball Reference

Teams
- Indianapolis Hoosiers (1887)

Frederick Peter Fass (October 30, 1859 – July 5, 1930) was a professional baseball player. He was a pitcher for one season (1887) with the Indianapolis Hoosiers. For his career, he compiled an 0–1 record in four appearances, recording a 10.34 earned run average and no strikeouts.

He died in Burnt Mill, Colorado at the age of 70.

== See also ==
- List of Major League Baseball annual saves leaders
