= Henry Boyle (baseball) =

American baseball player (1860–1932)

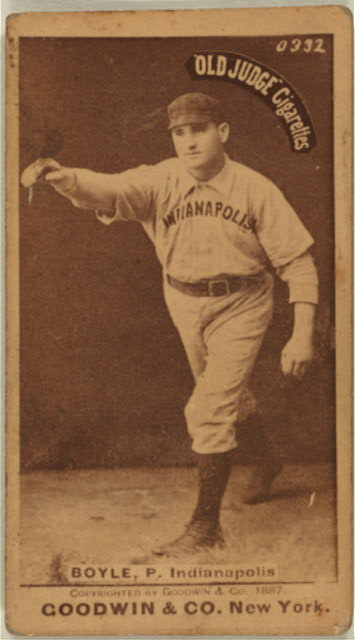
- Pitcher
- Born: September 20, 1860; Philadelphia, Pennsylvania, U.S.
- Died: May 25, 1932 (aged 71); Philadelphia, Pennsylvania, U.S.
- Batted: Right Threw: Right

MLB debut
- July 9, 1884, for the St. Louis Maroons

Last MLB appearance
- October 2, 1889, for the Indianapolis Hoosiers

MLB statistics
- Win–loss record: 89–111
- Earned run average: 3.06
- Strikeouts: 602
- Stats at Baseball Reference

Teams
- St. Louis Maroons (1884–1886); Indianapolis Hoosiers (1887–1889)

Career highlights and awards
- NL ERA leader (1886)

Henry J. "Handsome Harry" Boyle (September 20, 1860 – May 25, 1932) was an American professional baseball player. He was a pitcher over parts of 6 seasons (1884–1889) with the St. Louis Maroons and Indianapolis Hoosiers. He led the National League in ERA in 1886 while playing for the Maroons. For his career, he compiled an 89–111 record in 207 appearances, with a 3.06 ERA and 602 strikeouts.

== See also ==
- List of Major League Baseball annual ERA leaders
