= Horace Fogel =

American baseball executive

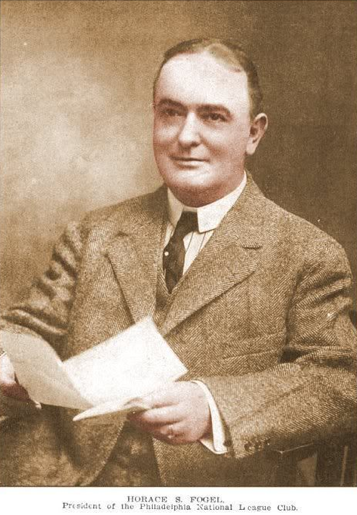
- Manager / President
- Born: March 2, 1861; Macungie, Pennsylvania, U.S.
- Died: November 15, 1928 (aged 67); Philadelphia, Pennsylvania, U.S.
- Managerial record at Baseball Reference

Teams
- As manager: Indianapolis Hoosiers (1887); New York Giants (1902); As president: Philadelphia Phillies (1909–1912)

Horace Solomon Fogel (March 2, 1861 – November 15, 1928) was an American Major League Baseball manager and executive who served as manager of the Indianapolis Hoosiers and New York Giants and as president of the Philadelphia Phillies.

== Early life ==
Fogel was born on March 2, 1861, in Macungie, Pennsylvania. He spent his youth working in the local iron ore mines and after a stint as a telegraph operator he entered the sports world as a sports writer for The Philadelphia Press and later the Philadelphia Evening Telegraph.

== Indianapolis Hoosiers ==
In 1887, at the recommendation of Francis Richter, Fogel was hired to manage the Indianapolis Hoosiers of the National League. During his tenure as manager, Fogel stripped Jack Glasscock of his captaincy, suspended and fined a number of other players, and accused umpires of robbing his team. In a letter published in the Indianapolis News, one of his players, Otto Schomberg, accused Fogel of drinking. He resigned after the season.

== Politics and return to writing ==
After leaving Indianapolis, Fogel returned to Philadelphia, where he wrote for the Sporting Life and served as sports editor of the Public Ledger. In 1892, he entered politics as a Democrat. He was an unsuccessful candidate for the Philadelphia City Council in 1892 and the Pennsylvania General Assembly in 1894. In 1893 he unsuccessfully lobbied for the position of Naval Officer of the Port of Philadelphia. In the sporting world, Fogel unsuccessfully campaigned for the positions of secretary of the Pennsylvania State League in 1894 and president of the Atlantic League in 1896.

From 1898 to 1900, Fogel was president of the National Basketball League. From 1899 to 1902 he was president of the Atlantic League.

== New York Giants ==
In 1902, Fogel was named manager of the New York Giants. He was the twelfth of thirteen managers employed by Andrew Freedman in his eight seasons as owner. After the Giants started out with a 18–23 record, Fogel was replaced as manager by captain Heinie Smith, but remained with the team as scout and press agent. In June 1902, Fogel, representing himself as an agent of the National League, attempted to lure players away from the American League.

== Second return to reports writing ==
After leaving the Giants, Fogel returned to the Evening Telegraph as its sports editor. In 1903 he succeeded Ernest Lanigan as The Sporting News's Philadelphia baseball writer. He wrote under the alias Veteran until 1907, when he began using his own name.

== Philadelphia Phillies ==
On November 26, 1909, it was announced that the Philadelphia Phillies had been sold to a syndicate and that Fogel would serve as the club's president. Fogel's syndicate was backed by Charles Phelps Taft, who also owned the Chicago Cubs. Taft and Cubs' president Charles Murphy publicly denied that they had purchased a second club, but did acknowledge that Taft was the owner of Philadelphia's National League Park.

=== Ban from baseball ===
On August 17, 1912, Fogel accused St. Louis Cardinals manager Roger Bresnahan of playing a weak lineup against the New York Giants in order to help his friend, Giants manager John McGraw, win the pennant. On September 6, 1912, after the Phillies lost both games of a double header to the Giants, he told reporters that the pennant race was “fixed” for the Giants. On September 28 he wrote and signed a statement accusing National League president Thomas Lynch and the league's umpires of colluding to give the National League championship to the Giants.

On September 30, 1912, Lynch announced that he would bring Fogel's charges to the National League's board of directors, where Fogel would have to substantiate them or face discipline. Fogel resigned as team president on November 22, 1912, and was succeeded by attorney and team vice president and minority partner Alfred Day Wiler. Hearings on Fogel's statements took place on November 26 and November 27, 1912. Afterwards, the board of directors voted 7 to 0 to "forever exclude [Fogel] from further participation in the councils of this league as the representative of the Philadelphia Baseball Club or any other club", with Philadelphia's representative Alfred Wiler abstaining. On December 14, 1912, Wiler announced that Fogel's option on the Phillies expired and he was no longer involved in the ownership of the club.

== Later life ==
After his ouster from the National League, Fogel attempted to stay involved in baseball by publishing a monthly magazine dedicated to the sport. The venture was unsuccessful. In 1913 he attempted to acquire a Philadelphia franchise in the Federal League, but the league had no desire to deal with him.

Fogel died of apoplexy on November 15, 1928. He had been in poor health since a stroke in 1922. He was survived by his wife and predeceased by their son. He is interred at Mount Peace Cemetery in Philadelphia.

== See also ==
- List of Major League Baseball figures who have been banned for life
- San Francisco Giants general managers and managers
