= Mark Polhemus =

American baseball player (1860–1923)

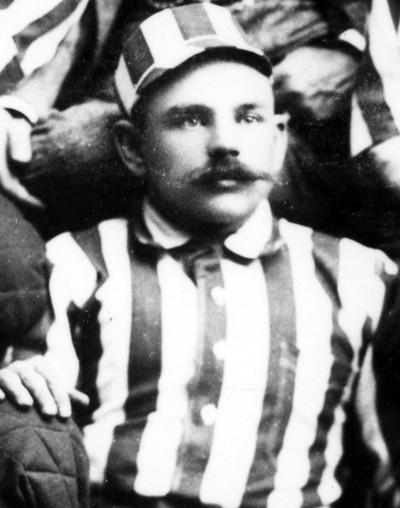
- Outfielder
- Born: October 14, 1860; Brooklyn, New York, U.S.
- Died: November 12, 1923 (aged 63); Lynn, Massachusetts, U.S.
- Batted: Unknown Threw: Unknown

MLB debut
- July 13, 1887, for the Indianapolis Hoosiers

Last MLB appearance
- August 11, 1887, for the Indianapolis Hoosiers

MLB statistics
- Batting average: .240
- Home runs: 0
- Runs batted in: 8
- Stats at Baseball Reference

Teams
- Indianapolis Hoosiers (1887)

Mark S. Polhemus (October 14, 1860 – November 14, 1923) nicknamed "Humpty Dumpty", was an American Major League Baseball player.

Polhemus started the 1887 season with Haverhill of the New England League. He hit .456 in 51 games and was then acquired by the major league Indianapolis Hoosiers. However, he hit and fielded poorly and only saw action in 20 games for the Hoosiers.

In 1888, he went back to the New England League with the Lowell Chippies. He hit .301 and led the Chippies with 14 home runs in just 75 games. In 1889, he played for the New Orleans Pelicans of the Southern League; he had another good season at the plate, leading the league in batting average, hits, doubles, and runs scored. New Orleans won the pennant.

Polhemus played in various other minor leagues through the 1898 season.
