= John Kirby (baseball) =

American baseball player (1865–1931)

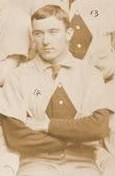
- Pitcher
- Born: January 13, 1865; St. Louis, Missouri, U.S.
- Died: October 6, 1931 (aged 66); St. Louis, Missouri, U.S.
- Threw: Right

MLB debut
- August 1, 1884, for the Kansas City Cowboys (UA)

Last MLB appearance
- June 29, 1888, for the Kansas City Cowboys (AA)

MLB statistics
- Win–loss record: 18-50
- Earned run average: 4.09
- Strikeouts: 200
- Stats at Baseball Reference

Teams
- Kansas City Cowboys (UA) (1884); St. Louis Maroons (1885–86); Indianapolis Hoosiers (1887); Cleveland Blues (1887); Kansas City Cowboys (AA) (1888)

John F. Kirby (January 13, 1865 – October 6, 1931) was an American Major League Baseball pitcher. He played all or part of five seasons in the majors, from 1884-1888, for the Kansas City Cowboys of the Union Association and St. Louis Maroons, Indianapolis Hoosiers, Cleveland Blues and Kansas City Cowboys of the American Association.
