= Henry Jackson (baseball) =

American baseball player (1861–1932)

- First baseman
- Born: June 23, 1861; Union City, Indiana, U.S.
- Died: September 14, 1932 (aged 71); Chicago, Illinois, U.S.
- Batted: Right Threw: Right

MLB debut
- September 13, 1887, for the Indianapolis Hoosiers

Last MLB appearance
- October 28, 1907, for the Indianapolis Hoosiers

MLB statistics
- Batting average: .308
- Home runs: 41
- Runs batted in: 93
- Stats at Baseball Reference

Teams
- Indianapolis Hoosiers (1887)

Henry Everett Jackson (June 23, 1861 – September 14, 1932) was an American Major League Baseball player. He played in 10 games for the 1887 Indianapolis Hoosiers of the National League.

== Sources ==
- Career statistics from Baseball Reference · Retrosheet · Baseball Almanac
