= John Cahill (baseball) =

American baseball player (1865–1901)

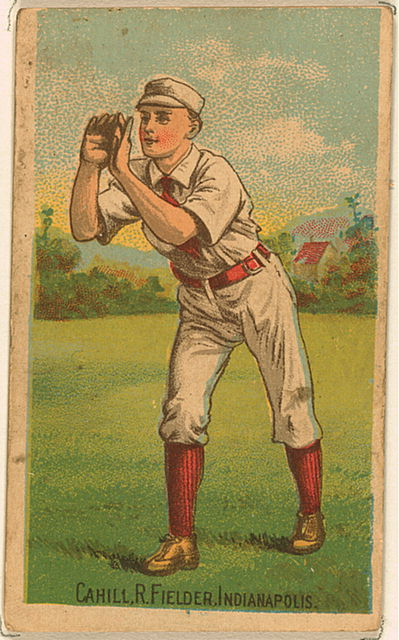
- Outfielder
- Born: April 30, 1865; San Francisco, California, U.S.
- Died: October 31, 1901 (aged 36); Pleasanton, California, U.S.
- Batted: Right Threw: Right

MLB debut
- May 31, 1884, for the Columbus Buckeyes

Last MLB appearance
- August 9, 1887, for the Indianapolis Hoosiers

MLB statistics
- Batting average: .205
- Home runs: 1
- Runs batted in: 58
- Stats at Baseball Reference

Teams
- Columbus Buckeyes (1884); St. Louis Maroons/Indianapolis Hoosiers (1886–87)

John Patrick Parnell "Patsy" Cahill (April 4, 1865 – October 31, 1901) was an American Major League Baseball outfielder. In addition to playing the outfield, Cahill played third base and shortstop and pitched 10 games.

There is speculation that Cahill was the inspiration for Ernest Lawrence Thayer's poem "Casey at the Bat" after Thayer reportedly saw Cahill play in Stockton, California.

== Professional career ==
=== Columbus Buckeyes ===
Cahill signed as a free agent with the Philadelphia Quakers in December 1883 but on May 19, 1884 his contract was purchased from the Quakers by the Columbus Buckeyes. Cahill began his professional career with the Buckeyes of the American Association in 1886. He played in 59 games and batted .219 with 46 hits, three doubles, three triples and six base on balls in 210 at bats.

=== St. Louis Maroons ===
In 1885 Cahill played for the Atlanta ball club of the Southern Association. He returned to the major leagues in 1886 playing for the St. Louis Maroons of the National League. Cahill hit only .199 with 92 hits with 17 doubles, six triples, one home run, 32 RBIs with 16 stolen bases.

=== Indianapolis Hoosiers ===
On March 8, 1887 Cahill was purchased by the Indianapolis Hoosiers from the St. Louis Maroons. Cahill would play out his final season in the Major Leagues with the Hoosiers batting .205 with 54 hits, four doubles, three triples, 26 RBIs and a career high 34 steals in 68 games. In addition to Cahill's batting statistics he also pitched a career high six games, including one start. He went 0–2 with a 14.32 ERA with five strikeouts.

=== Legacy ===
Cahill played the rest of his career in the minor leagues. Stops Cahill made included the Eau Claire, Wisconsin ball club of the Northwestern League, the Oakland Colonels of the California League, the Bloomington Reds of the Central Interstate League, the Stockton, California ball club of the California League, back to Oakland, then to the Sacramento Senators, back to Oakland, then to the Rock Island-Moline Twins in the Illinois–Indiana League, the Dallas Hams in the Texas League, the Fort Worth Panthers, the Denison Tigers of the Texas Southern League and then back to Fort Worth.

He was also an umpire after his playing career was over but Cahill died soon after that in 1901 at the age of 36 in Pleasanton, California and was buried at Saint Mary Cemetery, in Oakland, California.
