= Jack McGeachey =

American baseball player (1864–1930)

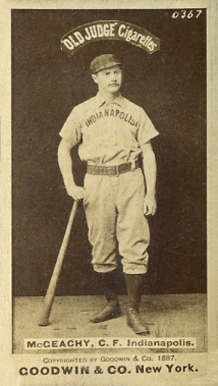
- Outfielder
- Born: May 13, 1864; Clinton, Massachusetts, U.S.
- Died: April 5, 1930 (aged 65); Cambridge, Massachusetts, U.S.
- Batted: Right Threw: Right

MLB debut
- June 17, 1886, for the Detroit Wolverines

Last MLB appearance
- August 24, 1891, for the Boston Reds

MLB statistics
- Batting average: .245
- Home runs: 9
- Runs batted in: 276
- Stolen bases: 164
- Stats at Baseball Reference

Teams
- Detroit Wolverines (1886); St. Louis Maroons (1886); Indianapolis Hoosiers (1887–89); Brooklyn Ward's Wonders (1890); Philadelphia Athletics (1891); Boston Reds (1891)

John Charles McGeachey, surname sometimes spelled McGeachy, (May 13, 1864 – April 5, 1930) was an American Major League Baseball player who played outfield for the Detroit Wolverines, St. Louis Maroons, Indianapolis Hoosiers, Brooklyn Ward's Wonders, Philadelphia Athletics, and Boston Reds from 1886-1891.

== See also ==
- List of Major League Baseball career stolen bases leaders
