= George Myers (baseball) =

American baseball player (1860–1926)

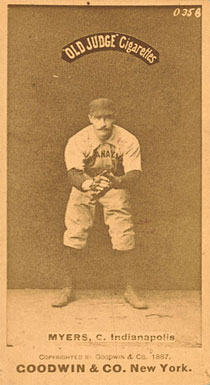
- Catcher
- Born: November 13, 1860; Buffalo, New York, U.S.
- Died: December 14, 1926 (aged 66); Buffalo, New York, U.S.
- Batted: Right Threw: Right

MLB debut
- May 2, 1884, for the Buffalo Bisons

Last MLB appearance
- August 3, 1889, for the Indianapolis Hoosiers

MLB statistics
- Batting average: .203
- Home runs: 5
- Runs batted in: 126
- Stats at Baseball Reference

Teams
- Buffalo Bisons (1884–85); St. Louis Maroons (1886); Indianapolis Hoosiers (1887–89)

George D. Myers (November 13, 1860 - December 14, 1926) was an American Major League Baseball player. He played six seasons in the majors, from 1884 until 1889, for the Buffalo Bisons, St. Louis Maroons, and Indianapolis Hoosiers.

== Sources ==
- Career statistics from Baseball Reference · Baseball Reference (Minors) · Retrosheet · Baseball Almanac
