= Hank Morrison =

American baseball player (1866–1927)

- Pitcher
- Born: May 22, 1866; Olneyville, Rhode Island, U.S.
- Died: September 30, 1927 (aged 61); Attleboro, Massachusetts, U.S.
- Batted: Right Threw: Right

MLB debut
- May 28, 1887, for the Indianapolis Hoosiers

Last MLB appearance
- July 28, 1887, for the Indianapolis Hoosiers

MLB statistics
- Win–loss record: 3–4
- Strikeouts: 13
- Earned run average: 7.58
- Stats at Baseball Reference

Teams
- Indianapolis Hoosiers (1887)

Stephen Henry Morrison (May 22, 1866 – September 30, 1927) was an American professional baseball player who played pitcher in the Major Leagues for the 1887 Indianapolis Hoosiers of the National League. He played minor league baseball in the Tri-State League from 1888 to 1890.
