= Lev Shreve =

American baseball player (1869–1942)

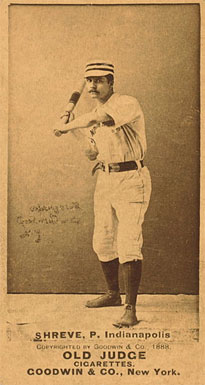
- Pitcher
- Born: March 12, 1866; Louisville, Kentucky, U.S.
- Died: November 7, 1942 (aged 73); Detroit, Michigan, U.S.
- Batted: Right Threw: Right

MLB debut
- May 2, 1887, for the Baltimore Orioles

Last MLB appearance
- September 27, 1889, for the Indianapolis Hoosiers

MLB statistics
- Win–loss record: 1–1
- Strikeouts: 2
- Earned run average: 5.40
- Stats at Baseball Reference

Teams
- Baltimore Orioles (1887); Indianapolis Hoosiers (1887–1889)

Leven Lawrence Shreve (March 12, 1866 in Louisville, Kentucky – November 7, 1942 in Detroit, Michigan), was an American pitcher in the Major Leagues from 1887–1889. He played for the Baltimore Orioles and Indianapolis Hoosiers.
