= Sam Moffet =

American baseball player (1857–1907)

- Outfielder / Pitcher
- Born: March 14, 1857; Wheeling, Virginia, U.S.
- Died: May 5, 1907 (aged 50); Butte, Montana, U.S.
- Batted: Right Threw: Right

MLB debut
- May 15, 1884, for the Cleveland Blues

Last MLB appearance
- June 22, 1888, for the Indianapolis Hoosiers

MLB statistics
- Games played: 88
- Batting average: .169
- Win–loss record: 6–29
- Earned run average: 4.00
- Stats at Baseball Reference

Teams
- Cleveland Blues (1884); Indianapolis Hoosiers (1887–1888)

Samuel R. Moffet (March 14, 1857 – May 5, 1907) was an American outfielder and pitcher in Major League Baseball. He played all or parts of three seasons between 1884 and 1888 for the Cleveland Blues and Indianapolis Hoosiers. Moffet stood at 6 ft 0 in (1.83 m) and weighed 175 lbs. His brother, Joe, also played in the major leagues.

== Biography ==
Sam Moffet was born in Wheeling, West Virginia when it was still part of Virginia. He played on amateur baseball teams as a teenager, and in 1882 he batted .404 for the Wheeling Standards. The following season, Moffet started his professional baseball career with the Northwestern League's Toledo Blue Stockings. He was a pitcher for Toledo and also played at first base and third base.

In 1884, Moffet made it to the major leagues with the Cleveland Blues. The Blues finished in seventh place, and Moffet, as their third starter, went just 3–19. The three wins all came in a single week from August 11 to August 18. Moffet's .136 winning percentage is tied for the fifth-lowest by a rookie in MLB history, and it was also the lowest winning percentage of any MLB pitcher during the 1880s. In addition to pitching, Moffet also played 42 games in the outfield that season. He batted .184 in 256 at bats.

After the season ended, Moffet went to Butte, Montana, and joined two of his brothers in a mining venture. They extracted over $200,000 worth of gold and silver over the next year, and Moffet was out of professional baseball in 1885 and 1886. In 1887, he returned to the majors with the Indianapolis Hoosiers, and he went 1–5 on the mound while batting .122. He didn't fare any better in 1888 and was released in mid-season.

Moffet then returned to Montana. In March 1889, The Meriden Daily Journal reported that he had "struck so rich in mining in Montana that he cleared $40,000".

Moffet was married to Mary Agnes "Minnie" Donaldson. He died in Butte, Montana, in 1907.
