= Milwaukee Brewers (1886–1892) =

American professional baseball team

- 1886–1892; Milwaukee, Wisconsin

Minor league affiliations
- Previous classes: Class A (1892); Major (1891); Class A (1888)
- Previous leagues: Western League (1892); American Association (1891); Western Association (1888–1891); Northwestern League (1886–1887)

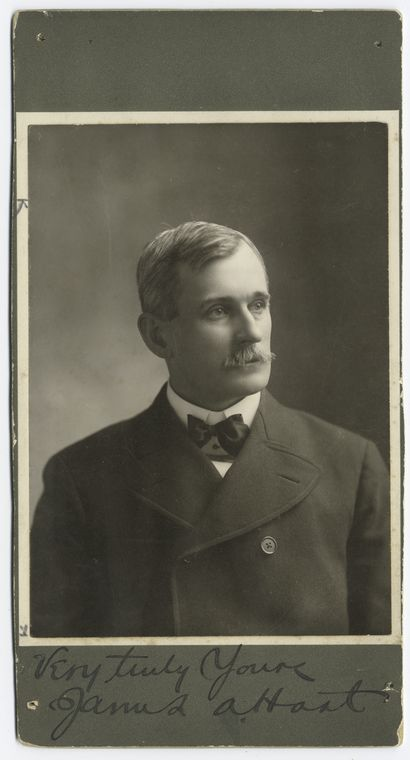
Jim Hart, manager during 1887 and 1888

The Milwaukee Brewers (sometimes called the Creams or the Cream Citys) (Note: Not to be confused with the earlier Milwaukee Cream Citys (1860s) or later Milwaukee Creams (1889–1913).) of 1886–1892 were an American professional baseball team and a member of (in order): the Northwestern League, Western Association, American Association, and Western League. Of those leagues, the American Association was considered a major league, while the others were considered minor league.

== Season records ==
Season	League	Class.	Manager	Record	Finish	Ref
1886	Northwestern League	—	Ted Sullivan	35–43 (.449)	6th of 6	
1887	Northwestern League	—	Jim Hart	78–43 (.645)	2nd of 8	
1888	Western Association	A	Jim Hart	53–54 (.495)	5th of 10	
1889	Western Association	—	Ezra Sutton	58–63 (.479)	5th of 8	
1890	Western Association	Ind.	Charlie Cushman	76–47 (.618)	3rd of 8	
1891	Western Association	—	Charlie Cushman	59–37 (.615)†	5th of 8	
1891	American Association	Major	Charlie Cushman	21–15 (.583)	5th of 9	
1892	Western League	A	Billy Barnie	32–21 (.604)‡	2nd of 8	

† In 1891, the team withdrew from the Western Association on August 16 to join the American Association.
‡ In 1892, the team disbanded on July 7.

== Major-league history ==
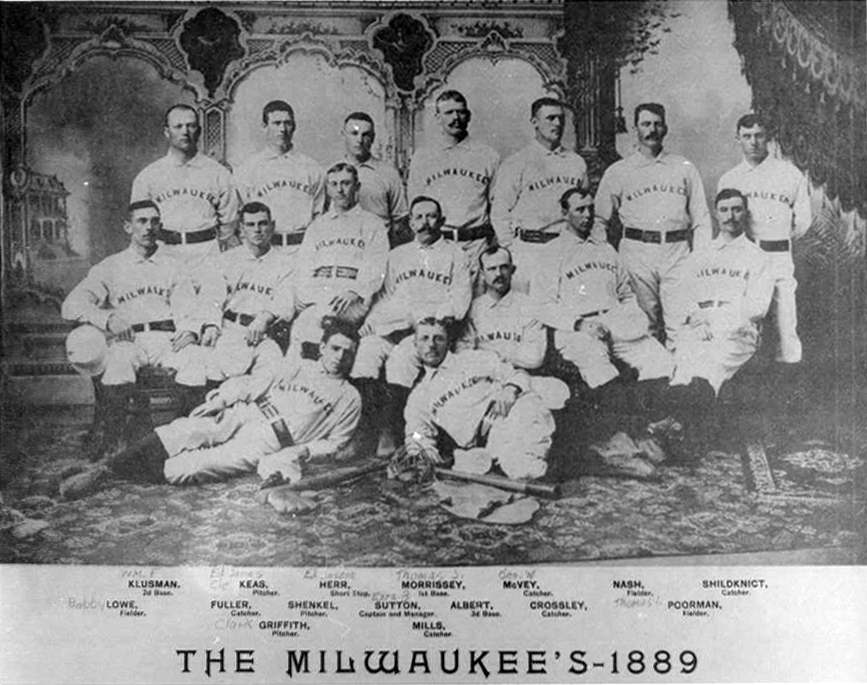
The 1889 Milwaukee team

During the 1891 season, the Cincinnati Kelly's Killers dropped out of the American Association (AA) on August 17, and the Brewers (then members of the Western Association) were recruited to finish the season. As a major-league team, the Brewers were managed by Charlie Cushman and finished their stint in the AA the with a record of 21–15. They played home games at Borchert Field, which was known as Athletic Field or Athletic Park in 1891.

Afterward, four AA clubs joined the National League, while the others were left out as the AA folded. The Brewers moved on to the newly re-formed Western League, but lasted just one more season before folding.

== See also ==
- History of professional baseball in Milwaukee
