= Charley Bassett =

American baseball player (1863–1942)

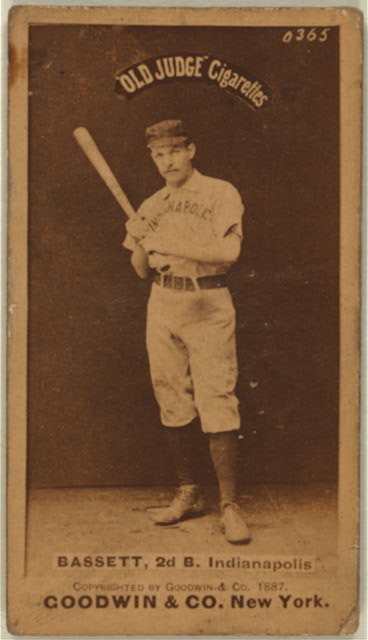
- Infielder
- Born: February 9, 1863; Central Falls, Rhode Island, U.S.
- Died: May 28, 1942 (aged 79); Pawtucket, Rhode Island, U.S.
- Batted: Right Threw: Right

MLB debut
- July 22, 1884, for the Providence Grays

Last MLB appearance
- October 15, 1892, for the Louisville Colonels

MLB statistics
- Batting average: .231
- Home runs: 15
- Runs batted in: 402
- Stats at Baseball Reference

Teams
- Providence Grays (1884–85); Kansas City Cowboys (NL) (1886); Indianapolis Hoosiers (NL) (1887–89); New York Giants (1890–92); Louisville Colonels (1892)

Charles Edwin Bassett (February 9, 1863 – May 28, 1942), was an American professional baseball infielder. He played all or part of nine seasons in Major League Baseball (MLB) from 1884-1892, for the Providence Grays, Kansas City Cowboys, Indianapolis Hoosiers, New York Giants, and Louisville Colonels.
