= Otto Schomberg =

American baseball player (1864–1927)

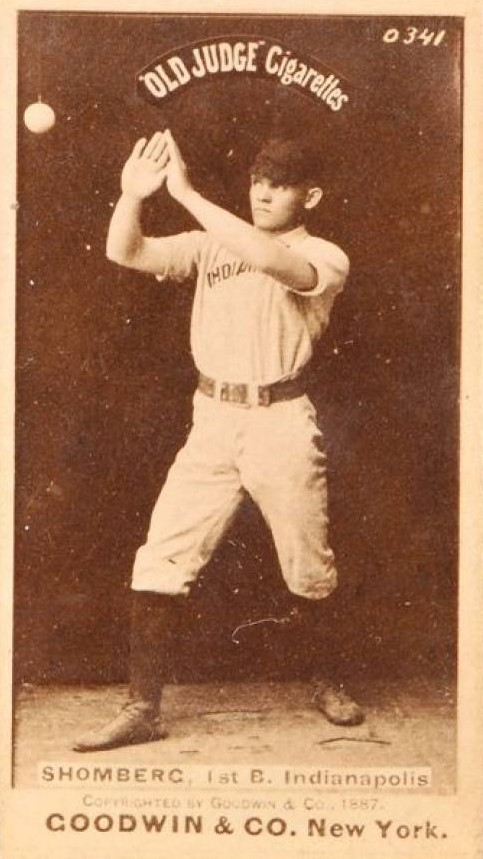
- 1887 baseball card of Schomberg
- First basemen
- Born: November 14, 1864; Milwaukee, Wisconsin, U.S.
- Died: May 3, 1927 (aged 62); Ottawa, Kansas, U.S.
- Batted: Left Threw: Left

MLB debut
- July 7, 1886, for the Pittsburgh Alleghenys

Last MLB appearance
- July 14, 1888, for the Indianapolis Hoosiers

MLB statistics
- Batting average: .283
- Home runs: 7
- Runs batted in: 122
- Stats at Baseball Reference

Teams
- Pittsburgh Alleghenys (1886); Indianapolis Hoosiers (1887–1888)

Otto H. Schomberg (born Otto H. Shambrick, November 14, 1864 – May 3, 1927) was an American Major League Baseball first baseman who played for the Pittsburgh Alleghenys and Indianapolis Hoosiers.

== Professional career ==
=== Pittsburgh Alleghenys ===
Schomberg was 21 when he broke into the major leagues with the Pittsburgh Alleghenys of the American Association. In one season with Pittsburgh, 1886, Schomberg batted .272 with 67 hits, six doubles, six triples, one home run, 29 runs batted in, and seven stolen bases.

=== Indianapolis Hoosiers ===
On December 1, 1886 the Alleghenys traded Schomberg with $400 to the St. Louis Maroons for Alex McKinnon. After the Maroons dissolved and became the Indianapolis Hoosiers, the Hoosiers purchased Schomberg's contract from the previous owners.

In 1887, Schomberg's first year with Indianapolis, he hit .308 with 129 hits, 18 doubles, 16 triples, five home runs, 83 RBIs, and 21 stolen bases in 112 games. Schomberg set career-highs in almost every offensive category, including games played, plate appearances, at bats, runs, hits, doubles, triples, home runs, RBIs, stolen bases, batting average, slugging percentage, and on-base plus slugging.

Schomberg's last season in the major leagues was in 1888. He hit only .214 with 24 hits, five doubles, one triple, one home run, 10 RBIs, and six stolen bases.

In two seasons with the Hoosiers, Schomberg hit .288 with 23 doubles, 17 triples, six home runs, 93 RBIs, and 27 stolen bases. He holds the Hoosiers' single-season record for on-base plus slugging and triples, and he is second in on-base percentage, third in slugging percentage, fourth in batting average, runs batted in, and bases on balls, sixth in runs scored, seventh in total bases, eighth in home runs, and tenth in hits. He is also third all-time in triples for the Hoosiers.
