= Watch Burnham =

American baseball umpire and manager

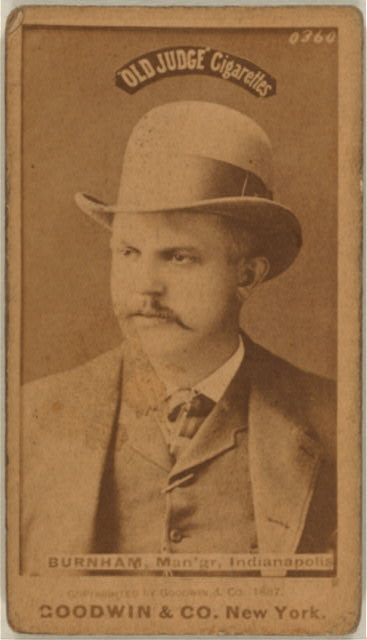
- Manager/Umpire
- Born: May 20, 1860; Albion, Michigan, U.S.
- Died: November 18, 1902 (aged 42); Detroit, Michigan, U.S.
- Batted: Unknown Threw: Unknown

MLB debut
- April 28, 1887, for the Indianapolis Hoosiers

Last MLB appearance
- May 30, 1887, for the Indianapolis Hoosiers

MLB statistics
- Games managed: 28
- Win–loss record: 6–22
- Winning %: .214

Teams
- Indianapolis Hoosiers (1887)

Career highlights and awards
- Called one no-hitter, on July 25, 1883

George Walter "Watch" Burnham (May 20, 1860 – November 18, 1902) was an American umpire and manager in Major League Baseball who was briefly in the National League in the 1880s. He was born in Albion, Michigan.

== Umpiring career ==
Burnham began his major league officiating career in 1883 when he called 41 National League games. On July 25 of that season, he called balls and strikes for a no-hitter thrown by "Old Hoss" Radbourn of the Providence Grays. Only a day or two later, he resigned from the position after it was reported that he was likely to be fired at the request of multiple teams. He said that he had grown very tired of trying to do the most thankless job in the world. At the same time, there were also rumors that Radbourn and catcher Barney Gilligan had conspired to purposely hit Burnham in the stomach with a pitch during a game.

His next appearances as an umpire were single games in 1886 and another in 1887, but he returned to part-time officiating when he called 33 games in 1889, and 31 games in 1895. In all, Watch umpired 107 games, 99 of which were behind the plate.

=== "Watch" nickname ===
The Cleveland Leader reported on July 26, 1883, that Burnham was gifted a gold watch following a Cleveland Blues game by an unnamed "certain prominent citizen of Cleveland." An inscription inside the watch reportedly read "Presented to George W. Burnham by his Cleveland friends." According to the article, that was all Burnham or anyone else seemed to know about it. Five years later, the Chicago Tribune reported on the incident more skeptically. The article alleges that Burnham "endeavored to establish himself in public esteem" by buying the watch himself and having it delivered to him on the field during a game.

John McGraw wrote in 1923 that Burnham got his nickname from an incident in which Joe Kelley unknowingly slapped his own watch out of Burnham's hand and kicked it across the infield after Burnham called Kelley out on a play at second base. However, Burnham was known as "Watch" at least as early as 1887, when Kelley would have been only fifteen and McGraw thirteen years old.

== Managerial career ==
Burnham, who was described in the Chicago Tribune as the main promoter of the effort to get an Indianapolis club in the National League, began the 1887 season as the manager of the upstart National League team, the Indianapolis Hoosiers. However, after a very slow start, the team had a 6–22 record and was in last place. He was fired on June 2. Fred Thomas took over as interim manager in addition to his front office duties.

== Later life ==
Watch Burnham died at the age of 42 in Detroit, Michigan, and is interred at Oakwood Cemetery in Saline, Michigan.
