= Alex McKinnon (baseball) =

American baseball player (1856–1887)

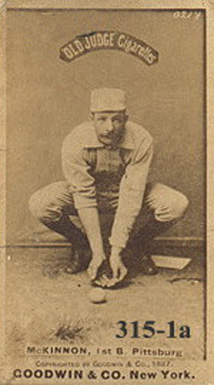
- First baseman
- Born: August 14, 1856; Boston, Massachusetts, U.S.
- Died: July 24, 1887 (aged 30); Charlestown, Massachusetts, U.S.
- Batted: Right Threw: Unknown

MLB debut
- May 1, 1884, for the New York Gothams

Last MLB appearance
- July 4, 1887, for the Pittsburgh Alleghenys

MLB statistics
- Batting average: .296
- Home runs: 13
- Runs batted in: 219
- Stats at Baseball Reference

Teams
- As player: New York Gothams (1884); St. Louis Maroons (1885 – 1886); Pittsburgh Alleghenys (1887); As manager: St. Louis Maroons (1885)

Alexander J. McKinnon (August 14, 1856 – July 24, 1887) was an American Major League Baseball first baseman from Boston, Massachusetts. He played for several teams in his short-lived career in the National League.

== Early career and expulsion ==
McKinnon began his amateur career with the Boston Stars in 1875, then joined the Syracuse Stars, and played first base for the next three seasons.

In 1879, McKinnon was a member of the Troy Trojans of the National League when decided to "jump" his contract and play for the Rochester club of the International Association, which was against the league's policy and he was expelled for this action. This expulsion caused a ripple effect that meant that no National League team could play versus Rochester, nor could they play against teams that had played Rochester. Though this could have caused the Association a great deal of money, they stood behind the team's decision even though National League President William Hulbert had made a secret deal that allowed Rochester to reorganize and circumvent the losses. McKinnon did not play very much during that season as he was struck with sickness for much of the time.

He decided to quit playing baseball after the season and moved west to engage in business interests. On November 27, 1882, McKinnon was married in Boston, although the marriage produced no children. On March 5, 1883, he was re-instated during a special session of the National League, and signed with the Philadelphia Quakers. He, again, was too sick to play and asked and received his release from the club for this reason.

== Major League career ==
He formally began his major league career for the 1884 New York Gothams, and led the league in games played with 116. While he hit well with a .272 batting average and 12 triples, he committed a record 53 errors at first base, for a .955 fielding percentage, a record that still stands today for the lowest percentage for a first baseman in a single season.

McKinnon moved on the St. Louis Maroons for the next two seasons. In 1885, he batted .294 and significantly improved his fielding at first base with a league leading .978 fielding percentage. Also during that season, he finished out the season as the player-manager, managing the final 39 games of the season, winning only six of them. This was his only stint as manager during his career. His hitting continued to improve in 1886, when he batted .301 and hit eight home runs. After the season, on December 1, he was traded to the Pittsburgh Alleghenys for Otto Schomberg and $400.

== Late career and death ==
The 1887 season began with McKinnon improving his hitting and fielding, likely becoming one of the better first basemen in the National League, when he contracted typhoid pneumonia and subsequently died in Charlestown, Massachusetts at the age of 30.

He was interred at Lowell Cemetery in Lowell, Massachusetts. Pittsburgh wore a black crêpe on their uniforms for the rest of the season to honor Alex.

== See also ==
- List of Major League Baseball player–managers
- List of baseball players who died during their careers
