= Jack Glasscock =

American baseball player (1857–1947)

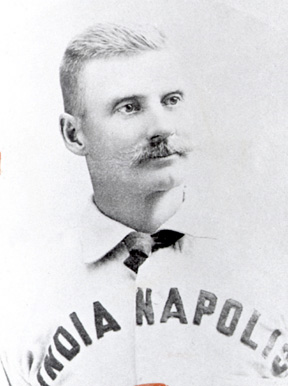
- Glasscock, c. 1887
- Shortstop
- Born: July 22, 1857; Wheeling, Virginia, U.S.
- Died: February 24, 1947 (aged 89); Wheeling, West Virginia, U.S.
- Batted: Right Threw: Right

MLB debut
- May 1, 1879, for the Cleveland Blues

Last MLB appearance
- July 13, 1895, for the Washington Senators

MLB statistics
- Batting average: .290
- Hits: 2,041
- Home runs: 27
- Runs batted in: 827
- Stolen bases: 372
- Managerial record: 35–35
- Winning %: .500
- Stats at Baseball Reference

Teams
- As player: Cleveland Blues (1879–1884); Cincinnati Outlaw Reds (1884); St. Louis Maroons (1885–1886); Indianapolis Hoosiers (1887–1889); New York Giants (1890–1891); St. Louis Browns (1892–1893); Pittsburgh Pirates (1893–1894); Louisville Colonels (1895); Washington Senators (1895); As manager: Indianapolis Hoosiers (1889); St. Louis Browns (1892)

Career highlights and awards
- NL batting champion (1890)

John Wesley Glasscock (July 22, 1857 – February 24, 1947) was an American shortstop in Major League Baseball who played for several teams from 1879 to 1895. Nicknamed "Pebbly Jack", he was the top player at his position in the 1880s during the sport's bare-handed era. He led the National League in fielding percentage seven times and in assists six times; he was the only shortstop to lead in fielding percentage and total chances in a season three different times until Luis Aparicio matched him. Ozzie Smith eventually surpassed Glasscock's marks in the 1980s; Glasscock also led the NL in double plays four times and in putouts twice. He won the 1890 batting title with a .336 average for the New York Giants and led the league in hits twice; in his final season he became the sixth major league player to make 2,000 hits. He was the first player to appear in over 600 games as a shortstop, and ended his career with major league records for games (1,628), putouts (2,821), assists (5,630), total chances (9,283), double plays (620) and fielding percentage (.910) at the position. When he retired he ranked fifth in major league history in games (1,736) and at bats (7,030), seventh in total bases (2,630) and eighth in doubles (313).

== Early life ==
Jack Glasscock was born in Wheeling, West Virginia (then Virginia), to Thomas Glasscock (born 1830) and the former Julia Collette (born 1833), and dropped out of school in fourth grade to pursue his father's trade of carpentry. Nicknamed "Pebbly Jack" for his habit of scrutinizing the infield for small stones, typically pocketing them, the practice helped him to avoid the bad-hop ground balls which more regularly afflicted other infielders; fielding averages of the era rarely exceeded .900 among shortstops. He played for the local Standard club in 1876, the Champion City club of Springfield, Ohio, in 1877, and the Pittsburgh Allegheny Base Ball Club of the International Association in 1878, the latter at third base. After Allegheny folded, he finished the season with Cleveland Blues.

== Major league career ==
He broke into the National League with that club in 1879, the first West Virginian in the majors, playing 80 games. After playing second and third bases as a rookie, he switched to shortstop permanently in 1880 with Fred Dunlap taking over at second. In 1881 he led the NL in putouts (105), assists (274) and fielding average (.911) for the first time. Over five seasons with the team he gradually improved his hitting, and in 1882 he was among the league's top ten players in home runs (4), doubles (27), slugging average (.450) and total bases (161) while also leading the league in assists (311) and tying Sadie Houck's major league record of 40 double plays, set the previous year; Frank Fennelly set a new major league mark with 46 for the 1885 Cincinnati Red Stockings in the American Association. In 1883, batting third, Glasscock led the team in runs batted in, and paced the NL in fielding again with a .922 average. In mid-1884 he jumped to the Cincinnati Outlaw Reds of the Union Association during that league's only season of play and batted .419 in 38 games.

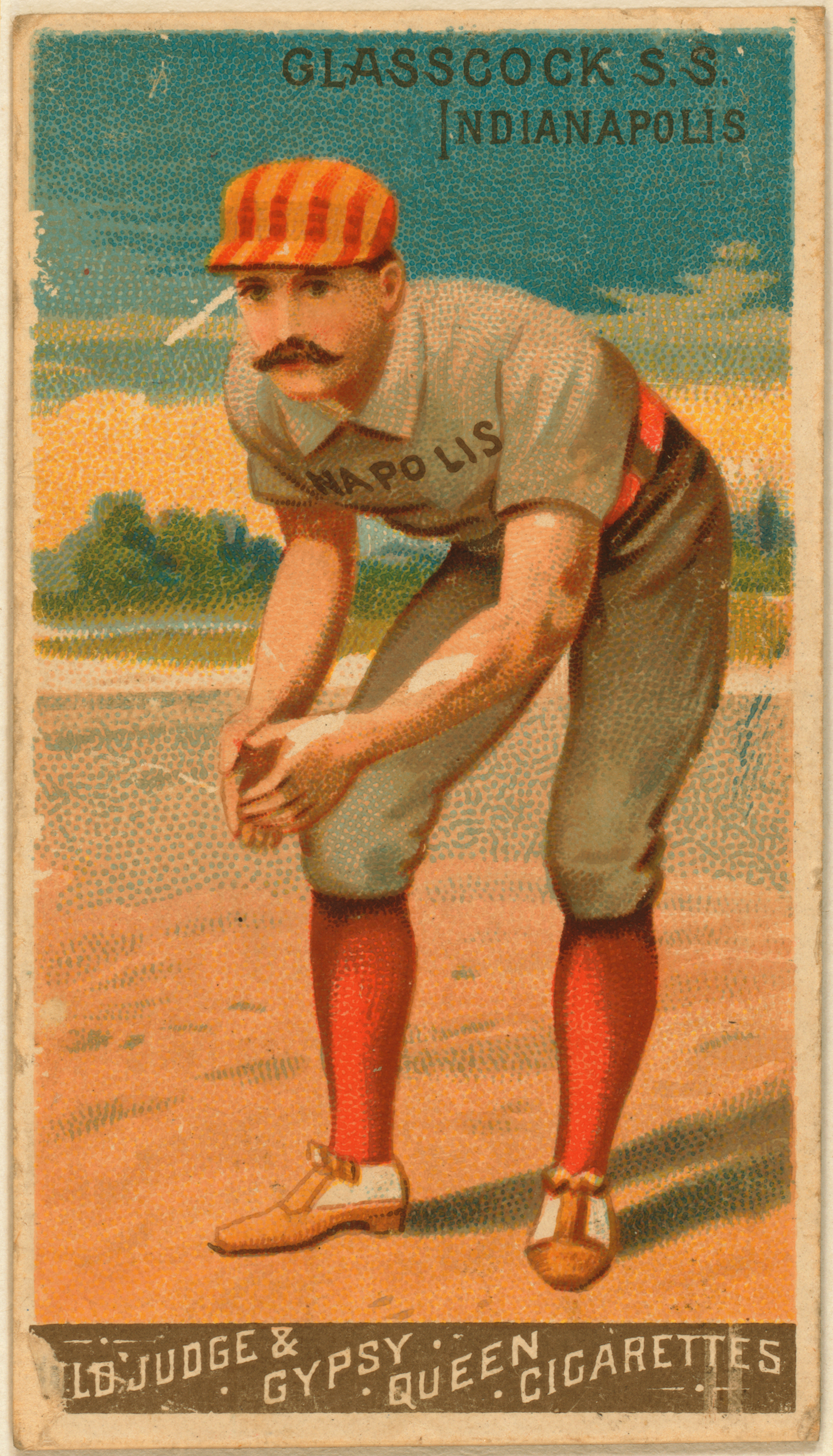
Jack Glasscock cigarette card (Goodwin & Company, 1888)

He returned to the NL with the St. Louis Maroons for the next two years, becoming team captain. In 1885 he set an NL record for assists (397), breaking Arthur Irwin's 1880 mark of 339, and led the league in fielding average (.917); he also moved ahead of Davy Force to become the major league career leader in games at shortstop. In 1886 he hit .325 and was fifth in the league in doubles and sixth in hits, also breaking his own NL record with 43 double plays and again leading the NL in assists (392) and fielding (.906). The Maroons moved to Indianapolis and became the Indianapolis Hoosiers before the 1887, and Glasscock continued his solid output in Indianapolis with a .294 average that year. He also set new major league records for assists (493) and double plays (58), topping Fennelly's totals of 485 and 54 with the previous year's Red Stockings. Ollie Beard broke his major league assists mark with 537 for the 1889 Red Stockings, and Bob Allen set a new NL mark with 500 for the 1890 Philadelphia Phillies. Glasscock led the league in fielding (.901) again in 1888, and would later break his own NL double play record with 60 in 1889, though Beard set a new major league mark with 63 the same year; Allen broke the NL mark with 68 in 1890.

1889 marked Glasscock's top all-around season as he batted .352 – second in the NL behind Dan Brouthers, and the best average by a major league shortstop prior to 1893, when the pitching distance was increased to 60 feet (18 m) – and led the league in hits (205). He was second in doubles (40, behind King Kelly) and total bases (272, behind Jimmy Ryan), and was fifth in the league with a career-high 128 runs. Furthermore, he led the league in every defensive category (246 putouts, 478 assists, 60 double plays, .915 average). His 246 putouts set a new NL record, breaking John Montgomery Ward's 1887 major league record of 226 (Herman Long had 335 for the 1889 American Association Kansas City Cowboys); Bob Allen would also break this record just a year later. Glasscock hit for the cycle on August 8 of that year; he also managed the team for the last half of the season, posting a 34–32 record. Early in the year, he discovered 17-year-old future Hall of Famer Amos Rusie pitching for a local semi-pro team, and the young hurler was promptly acquired for Indianapolis.

When the Hoosiers folded after the 1889 season, his contract – as well as Rusie's – was awarded to the Giants to replace Ward, who was leading many of the sport's top players in a shift to the Players' League for the 1890 season. Glasscock had been intending to switch leagues as well but was expelled from the Brotherhood of Professional Base Ball Players after signing his 1890 contract with Indianapolis. He won the 1890 batting championship by eleven points over Billy Hamilton, going 6-for-6 on September 27; he also became the second player to lead the NL in hits two years in a row (joining Brouthers), and was second in doubles to Sam Thompson and fifth in total bases. His offensive totals dropped off in later seasons, partially as a result of an 1891 hand injury. When the American Association merged with the NL prior to the 1892 season, Glasscock shifted to the St. Louis Browns (the team now known as the Cardinals), hitting .241 and .267 in two full seasons; he also managed the team for the first four games of the 1892 season, going 1–3. In June 1893 he was traded to the Pittsburgh Pirates, and he hit .341 over the remainder of the year, finishing with a .320 average and also with 100 RBI for the first time. The team finished only five games out of first place, the closest he would come to a league title during his major league career. He batted .280 in his last full season in 1894, leading the NL in fielding for the last time with a .933 average, and ended his major league career in 1895, splitting the year between the Louisville Colonels and the Washington Senators.

Glasscock left the major leagues with a .290 career batting average, 2,040 hits, 27 home runs, 1163 runs, 825 runs batted in and 98 triples. His batting average was nearly thirty points higher than the league average of the time, and he ranked eighth all-time in hits when he retired. He was one of the most difficult players of the 19th century to strike out, doing so just once in every 33 at bats. He played a notable role in the advancement of defensive tactics, being one of the first shortstops to use signals indicating which infielder would cover second base on steal attempts, and also one of the first to back up throws to the second baseman. Germany Smith broke his records for career assists and total chances in 1897, and his mark for games at shortstop in 1898. Herman Long broke his record for putouts in 1898, and his mark for double plays in 1900. Tommy Corcoran bettered his career fielding percentage by the end of the 19th century. Despite his talents, he received only 2.6% of the vote on his first and only ballot on the National Baseball Hall of Fame and Museum in 1936.

== "Charley horse" ==
Some sources credit Glasscock as the originator of the term Charley horse.

== Later life ==
Glasscock returned to Wheeling and played on a minor league team run by Ed Barrow, winning the first pennant of his career; he remained in the minor leagues as a first baseman until 1901, winning an 1896 batting title with a .431 average. After his baseball career ended, he returned to carpentry. He died in Wheeling from a stroke at age 89 in 1947 and is buried in Wheeling's Greenwood Cemetery.

== See also ==
- List of Major League Baseball career hits leaders
- List of Major League Baseball career runs scored leaders
- List of Major League Baseball career stolen bases leaders
- List of Major League Baseball batting champions
- List of Major League Baseball player-managers
- List of Major League Baseball single-game hits leaders
- List of Major League Baseball players to hit for the cycle

Achievements
| Preceded by Pete Browning | Hitting for the cycle August 8, 1889 | Succeeded by Larry Twitchell |
