= Fred Dunlap =

American baseball player and manager (1859–1902)

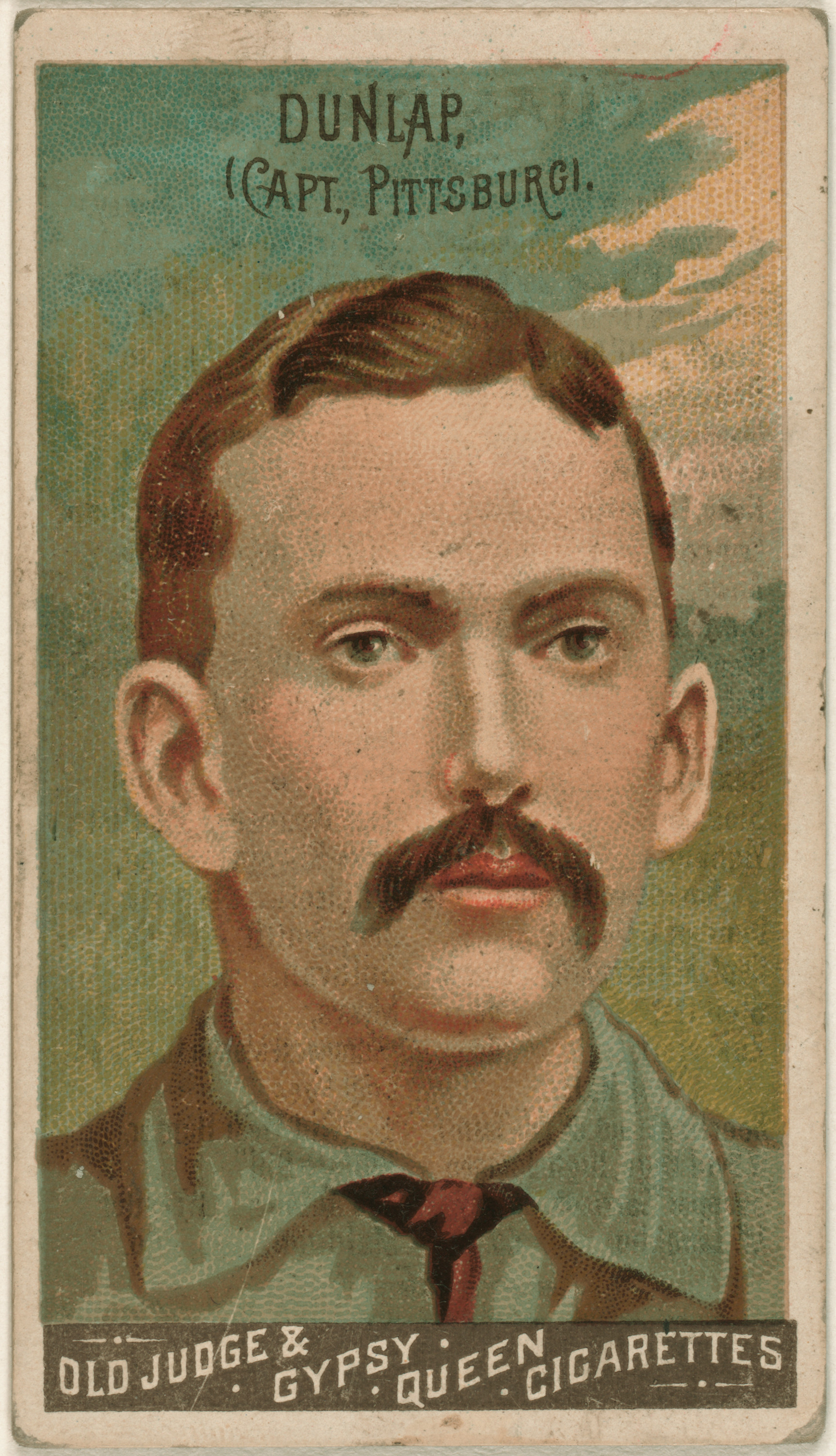
- 1888 baseball card of Dunlap
- Second baseman
- Born: May 21, 1859; Philadelphia, Pennsylvania, U.S.
- Died: December 1, 1902 (aged 43); Philadelphia, Pennsylvania, U.S.
- Batted: Right Threw: Right

MLB debut
- May 1, 1880, for the Cleveland Blues

Last MLB appearance
- April 20, 1891, for the Washington Statesmen

MLB statistics
- Batting average: .292
- Home runs: 41
- Runs batted in: 366
- Stats at Baseball Reference

Teams
- As player: Cleveland Blues (1880–1883); St. Louis Maroons (1884–1886); Detroit Wolverines (1886–1887); Pittsburgh Alleghenys (1888–1890); New York Giants (1890); Washington Statesmen (1891); As manager: Cleveland Blues (1882); St. Louis Maroons (1884–1885); Pittsburgh Alleghenys (1889)

Career highlights and awards
- Union Association batting champion (1884); Union Association home run leader (1884)

Frederick C. "Sure Shot" Dunlap (May 21, 1859 – December 1, 1902) was an American second baseman and manager in Major League Baseball from 1880 to 1891. He was the highest paid player in Major League Baseball from 1884 to 1889. He has also been rated by some contemporary and modern sources as the greatest overall second baseman of the 19th century. He earned the nickname "Sure Shot" for the strength and accuracy of his throws to first base, and was also sometimes referred to in the 1880s as the "King of Second Basemen."

Dunlap played for the Cleveland Blues from 1880 to 1883, where he secured his reputation as one of the best players in the game. As a rookie in 1880, he led the National League in doubles and ranked second in extra base hits. While playing for Cleveland, he also compiled batting averages of .325 and .326 in 1881 and 1883 and led the league in assists by a second baseman and range factor. When the Union Association was formed in 1884, Dunlap was lured to play for the St. Louis Maroons where he became the highest paid player in baseball. His .412 batting average in 1884 was the highest ever recorded to that time in Major League Baseball and 56 points higher than any other player in the major leagues in 1884 due to the lack of talent in the UA.

After three years in St. Louis, Dunlap was sold to the Detroit Wolverines and helped that team win the 1887 National League pennant. Dunlap's baseball career ended in 1891 when he broke his leg sliding into a base. He went into the construction business and bet on horses in the 1890s. At the time of his death in 1902, Dunlap was penniless and living in a rundown boarding house.

== Early years ==
Dunlap was born in Philadelphia, Pennsylvania, in 1859. Both of his parents died when he was 10 years old. Dunlap did not attend school after his parents died and spent his youth playing baseball. Lacking formal education, Dunlap remained illiterate throughout his life.

Dunlap began playing semi-pro baseball at age 15 in 1874 for the Gloucester Club in Gloucester City, New Jersey. In 1875, he started the season with the Greighers of Camden, New Jersey, then joined the Kleinz Club of Philadelphia. He played for Chester at the start of the 1876 season before joining the Quicksteps of Wilmington, Delaware, as a pitcher. In 1877, he began playing professional baseball as a second baseman for the Auburns of Auburn, New York. In 1878, he played for teams in Hornellsville and Albany, New York. He remained with Albany in 1879.

== Major League Baseball ==
=== Cleveland Blues ===
In May 1880, Dunlap began a 12-year career in Major League Baseball with the Cleveland Blues. In his first season, Dunlap immediately established himself as one of the game's best players. For the 1880 season, Dunlap led the National League (NL) in doubles (27) and ranked second in extra base hits (40) and times on base (132) while serving as the team's leadoff hitter. He also made a strong debut on defense, leading the National League in assists by a second baseman (290). Dunlap remained with the Blues for four seasons and consistently ranked as one of the leading hitters and defensive second basemen in the National League. In 1881, he compiled 156 total bases, the second most in the NL, and had a .325 batting average and .444 slugging percentage, ranking fifth in the NL in both categories. In 1882, he led the NL's second basemen with 297 assists and a range factor of 6.73.

In his final year in Cleveland, Dunlap had a .326 batting average, .361 on-base percentage, and .452 slugging percentage, ranking among the league's leaders in each of those categories. Defensively, he led the league's second basemen in putouts (304) and ranked third in assists (290) and fielding percentage (.911). Dunlap was the star of the Cleveland team in the early 1880s. So key was he to the Blues that one writer observed, "The Maroons without Dunlap are like the play of Hamlet without the melancholy Dane."

=== "Sure Shot" ===
Dunlap was known during his baseball career by the nicknames "Sure Shot" and "King of Second Basemen". Most accounts indicate that the "Sure Shot" nickname arose from Dunlap's powerful and accurate throws to first base. King Kelly reportedly gave Dunlap the "Sure Shot" nickname after watching him throw. One account described Dunlap's throwing prowess as follows: "[E]ndless practice made him adept as a monkey at grabbing a sizzling ground ball in either hand and firing it off from the very spot he seized it. His whistling throws, which seemed to clear the grass by no more than half a foot, never seemed to lose more than an inch or two."

Alfred Henry Spink, who saw Dunlap play, wrote that Dunlap could chase down a ball in the outfield and throw it to home plate "with such fearful speed and accuracy that the ball seemed to sing as it flew." Dunlap was known for his range in getting to balls that others of his era could not, and he was reportedly able to dive for a ball and throw while lying on the ground with enough velocity to sting the first baseman's hand. Dunlap was ambidextrous and was able to catch and throw a baseball with the same skill and accuracy with either hand. Moreover, Dunlap reportedly never wore a glove.

One source gives an entirely different account of how Dunlap obtained the "Sure Shot" nickname. In his book on the history of the home run, Mark Ribowsky wrote that the nickname dated back to a game against the Chicago White Stockings on July 10, 1880. The White Stockings had won 21 straight games until Dunlap hit a walk-off two-run home run in the bottom of the ninth inning. According to Ribowsky, "For this Shot Heard 'Round Cleveland, Dunlap won the nickname 'Sure Shot.'"

=== St. Louis Maroons ===
In November 1883, Dunlap signed a contract to play for the St. Louis Maroons in the new Union Association. He was the biggest star lured to the new league. His contract paid Dunlap a salary of $3,400 (including $1,000 paid in advance), the highest salary paid to any baseball player at that time. He remained the highest paid baseball player every year from 1884 to 1889.

Dunlap played second base for the St. Louis Maroons from 1884 to 1886 and also served as the team's manager for portions of those seasons. During the 1884 season, the Maroons and Dunlap dominated the Union Association. The team compiled a record of 94-19, and Dunlap led the new league in most significant offensive and defensive categories. His .412 batting average was 56 points higher than any other player in the Union Association, the National League, or the American Association. He also led the league in on-base percentage (.448), slugging percentage (.621), runs scored (160), hits (185), total bases (279), home runs (13), extra base hits (60), assists by a second baseman (300), putouts by a second baseman (341), range factor at second base (6.41), and fielding percentage at second base (.926). Dunlap's .412 batting average in 1884 was the highest ever recorded in any of the major leagues up to that time. His 160 runs scored in 1884 remains one of the highest single-season totals in major league history.

Some baseball historians have suggested that Dunlap's accomplishments during the 1884 season should be discounted due to the lesser talent pool in the Union Association. In 1885, the Union Association was disbanded after only one year, and the St. Louis Maroons joined the National League. Although his batting average dropped 142 points to .270 in 1885, Dunlap continued to be one of the best defensive second basemen in the major leagues. He led the National League's second basemen in 1885 with a .934 fielding percentage and ranked second in assists (374), putouts (314), and range factor (6.49). Dunlap spent a third season with the Maroons in 1886, and hit for the cycle on May 24. However, the Maroons were in financial distress, and rumors spread that the team might disband.

=== Detroit Wolverines ===
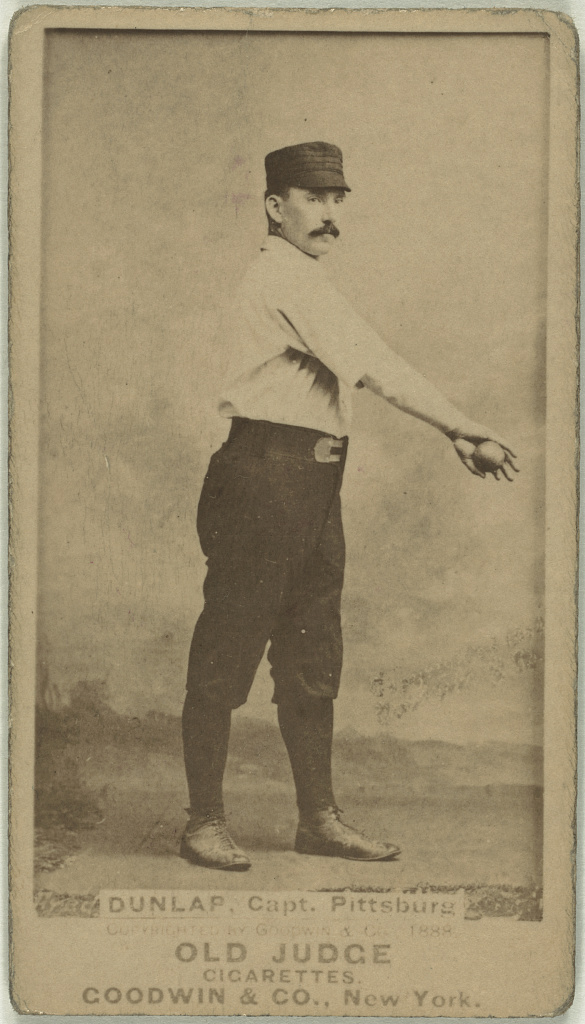
1888 baseball card of Dunlap

In early August 1886, Dunlap was sold to the Detroit Wolverines for $4,700, the most expensive purchase price at the time. In addition to the sum paid to the Maroons to grant the release, the Detroit team signed a contract to pay Dunlap $4,500 a season for two seasons, with an advance of $1,500 on the first day of November 1886 and 1887, respectively. The mid-season sale led to concerns about the Maroons: "The transfer of Dunlap to Detroit is a small thing in itself, but its bearing on the entire base ball world is so great as to almost revolutionize the present order of things. He was the king pin of the St. Louis Club and his sale makes a certainty of the dissolution of the Maroons." The Detroit management was praised for their "pluck and enterprise" in making the bold "business stroke." The Sporting News wrote at the time:

"Dunlap has joined the Detroits and now that team will fly the League pennant just as sure as time flies and the world grows. From the day the old St. Louis Union team went out of existence Dunlap has been anything but a favorite in St. Louis. Still there was no one in the world but was willing to concede that he was the greatest second baseman America has ever known."

Dunlap, too, expressed delight at the move, noting that he had "tried for two seasons to get away from the Maroons." While the reaction to the acquisition was overwhelmingly positive in Detroit, the Detroit Free Press expressed some concern over Dunlap's reputation as a "disorganizer" and "mischief maker." For the 1886 season, Dunlap led the National League with a career high 393 assists, more than any NL player at any position. In 1887, Dunlap's defensive play at second base helped lead the Detroit Wolverines to the NL pennant with a record of 79-45. Dunlap again led the NL's second basemen in fielding percentage (.948) while also ranking second in range factor (6.72). He also played in 11 games of the 1887 World Series against the American Association champions, the St. Louis Browns. Detroit won the series 10 games to 5. At the end of the 1887 season, Sporting Life praised Dunlap's contributions to Detroit's championship team: "Dunlap is the king of second basemen, and a first-class all-round player. His fielding average in 1886 was .931, ranking third. This season he ranks first, with .949. ... Dunlap is one of the most active men on the field, and is of great value to a team on account of his ability as a kicker and coacher."

Before the last game of the World Series had been played, rumors spread that Detroit (which had amassed an all-star lineup with a commensurate payroll) was in negotiations to unload Dunlap's high salary by selling him to Pittsburgh. Dunlap announced in November 1887 that he would not consent unless the Detroit club paid him half of the sum it was to receive from Pittsburgh to secure his release. He said at the time, "I am sick and tired of being sold without gaining anything by it, and it is about time that my bank account was benefited by these transfers." He told a reporter for The New York Times that he was not penniless and would refuse to play unless his demands were met. He told the reporter that the Detroit club had three choices -- "give me half of the money secured for my release, allow me to go where I please, or fulfill the contract made with me last year."

In January 1888, Dunlap finally consented to the sale and received $2,000 of the $5,000 sales price paid to Detroit. His total annual compensation on signing with Pittsburgh was $6,000, making him the highest paid player in baseball history to that time. The Detroit Free Press congratulated the "cranks" of Pittsburgh for their team's acquisition of "no less than the king second baseman of the country."

=== Pittsburgh Alleghenys ===
Dunlap played for the Pittsburgh Alleghenys from 1888 to 1890, and served as manager of the Alleghenys for a portion of the 1889 season. During his three years in Pittsburgh, Dunlap's offensive performance declined. His batting average for the Alleghenys went from .262 in 1888 to .235 in 1889. At the same time, he remained one of the leading defensive second basemen in the game. In 1888, Dunlap ranked second among the league's second basemen in fielding percentage (.940) and range factor (6.33), and in 1889, Dunlap's last full season in the major leagues, his .950 fielding percentage led the National League and was a career high for Dunlap.

Before the start of the 1890 season, Dunlap engaged in protracted salary negotiations with President Nimick of the Alleghenys. In late March 1890, the Pittsburg Dispatch reported that the two sides had reached a resolution, "and it now seems certain that Dunlap will play his old position in the Pittsburg league club." Nimick said at the time: "I had a long talk with Mr. Dunlap, and we agreed to terms for him to play with us this season. Of course the terms were below those of last year, that is, he will play for much less than $5,000. He did not sign a contract, for reasons that were quite satisfactory to me ... We know he is a good player and he is quite willing to remain with us."

In the first 17 games of the 1890 season, Dunlap's batting average fell to .172, and as a result he was released by the Alleghenys on May 15. Aside from his batting average, disagreements with Pittsburgh's manager, Guy Hecker, reportedly contributed to the decision. The Pittsburgh Dispatch quoted manager Hecker as saying, "Dunlap is certainly the worst man to get along with that I ever met. He has had everybody in hot water during our entire western trip." Others speculated that Dunlap's release was motivated by his $3,500 salary and the fact that Pittsburgh's backup second baseman, Henry Youngman, had signed for a salary of only $1,050.

=== Giants and Statesmen ===
Dunlap jumped to the New York Giants of the Players' League in late May 1890. At the time, the Washington correspondent for Sporting Life predicted that Dunlap would bring bad luck to his new team. He wrote: "Fred is a great player, but the hoo-doo that seems to shadow him will make itself felt wherever he may go. There are a number of people in this vicinity who have watched his course with more than ordinary interest, and they do not hesitate to declare him a Jonah." Dunlap appeared in only one game for the Giants and announced in July that he would play no more in 1890 and that he would spend the remainder of the summer at Atlantic City, New Jersey, with plans to return in 1891 "and play the game of his life."

Dunlap concluded his baseball career in 1891 with the Washington Statesmen in the American Association. He appeared in only eight games for the Statesmen before breaking his leg sliding into a base on April 20, 1891. In early June 1891, the Washington management notified him that it would discontinue his salary payments. Dunlap returned the notice and filed a grievance, contending he should have been continued at least on half pay since he was disabled while sliding into a base. Washington refused to pay, and he never played professional baseball again.

=== Career statistics ===
In 965 games over 12 seasons, Dunlap posted a .292 batting average (1159-for-3974) with 759 runs, 224 doubles, 53 triples, 41 home runs, 366 RBI, 85 stolen bases, 283 bases on balls, .340 on-base percentage and .406 slugging percentage. He finished his career with a .924 fielding percentage.

== Later life ==
When he retired from baseball, Dunlap was reported to have $100,000 in savings. He went into the building business in Philadelphia during the 1890s, and owned various properties in the city. The Sporting Life reported that Dunlap "dropped out of the game in 1892 to follow the racing game, at which he lost the respectable fortune he accumulated in base ball." Another account indicated that Dunlap lost everything on stock market investments. In July 1902, the Philadelphia Times reported that Dunlap was "clean broke."

In December 1902, Dunlap died penniless and alone at age 43. According to the Sporting Life, the "last two years of his life were spent in abject poverty and mental gloom" in a Philadelphia boarding house. According to several accounts, a policeman at the morgue saw the body and believed it to be Dunlap. Lave Cross was called to the morgue and confirmed that the body was Dunlap. His funeral was poorly attended by his former baseball colleagues, and one former player who did attend observed, "There were not enough friends of Dunlap at his funeral to bury him and we had to call on the hack drivers to make up the list of active pall-bearers." Following Dunlap's death, William A. Phelon, Jr., editor of Sporting Life wrote:

"So Fred Dunlap has passed into the great beyond, and the man whose salary figure marked the high-water limit of the long ago is gone! ... What a ball player this Dunlap was and what an artist in getting the fat salaries! ... Dunlap was a real infielder of the type so popular ten years ago -- one of the solid, bulky style through whom no grounder seemed able to pass, but who could nevertheless wave the hot ones goodbye with graceful ease when occasion demanded. With the gloves now in use to aid, Dunny would have been even a bigger wonder now than then."

== Legacy ==
Dunlap has been rated by some contemporary and modern sources as the greatest overall second baseman of the 19th century. In his 1910 book on the history of baseball, Alfred Henry Spink, the founder of The Sporting News, was unequivocal: "I have seen all the great second basemen ... I am free to say that Dunlap was far and away the greatest second baseman that ever lived." Stanley Robinson, who owned and managed major league teams in St. Louis and Cleveland, went even further: "He was not only the greatest second baseman, but take him in all the departments of the game, he was perhaps the greatest player that ever lived." Another of Dunlap's contemporaries, Sam Crane, also picked Dunlap as the greatest second baseman in a newspaper column published in 1912. Crane wrote: "Fred Dunlap was acknowledged to be the best second baseman of his day, and was excellent from every angle. I think he excelled Fred Pfeffer." In 1910, John Montgomery Ward, a Hall of Fame inductee who played from 1878 to 1894, published an article about the greatest infielders in baseball history. While picking Fred Pfeffer as a shade better than Dunlap", Ward observed: "Fred Dunlap was the king. Dunlap had the record average of .953 in 64 games with the Detroit club in 1887, and was the personification of ease and grace. He was something of a grandstand player, because of his tendency to make one-handed catches and stops but he got there just the same and was a big favorite wherever he showed."

In a 2008 book using modern sabermetric methods, author William F. McNeil concluded that Dunlap was the best offensive second baseman, the second best defensive second baseman, and the best overall second baseman of the 19th century. Dunlap's career range factor of 6.31 at second base still ranks as the fifth highest in the history of Major League Baseball. However, Bill James, in his 2001 book The New Bill James Historical Baseball Abstract, ranked Dunlap as the 89th greatest second baseman of all time (and the 8th best of those who played the majority of their careers in the 19th century). James wrote that Dunlap was "never a legitimate star in a legitimate major league, but a good second baseman and a .275 hitter." (in actuality, Dunlap batted .277 playing in the National League).

== See also ==
- List of Major League Baseball annual doubles leaders
- List of Major League Baseball annual runs scored leaders
- List of Major League Baseball players to hit for the cycle
- List of Major League Baseball player-managers

Achievements
Preceded by Mox McQuery	Hitting for the cycle May 24, 1886	Succeeded by Pete Browning
