= St. Louis Maroons/Indianapolis Hoosiers =

Professional baseball club

Years 1884–1889

Based in St. Louis, Missouri (1884–1886) Indianapolis (1887–1889)

Major league affiliations

Union Association (1884); National League (1885–1889)

Ballpark
- St. Louis; Union Base Ball Park aka Lucas Park (1884–1886); Indianapolis; Athletic Park (1887–1889); Bruce Grounds (Sunday games 1887); Indianapolis Park (Sunday games 1888–1889)

Colors
- Maroon, white (St. Louis, 1884–1885) Black, white (St. Louis, 1886) Navy, yellow, white (Indianapolis, 1887–1889)

Owners
- Henry Lucas (1884–1886); John T. Brush (1887–1889)

Managers
- Ted Sullivan (1884); Fred Dunlap (1884–1885); Alex McKinnon (1885); Gus Schmelz (1886); Watch Burnham (1887); Fred Thomas (1887); Horace Fogel (1887); Harry Spence (1888); Frank Bancroft (1889); Jack Glasscock (1889)

Major league titles
- Union Association pennants 1 (1884); National League pennants 0

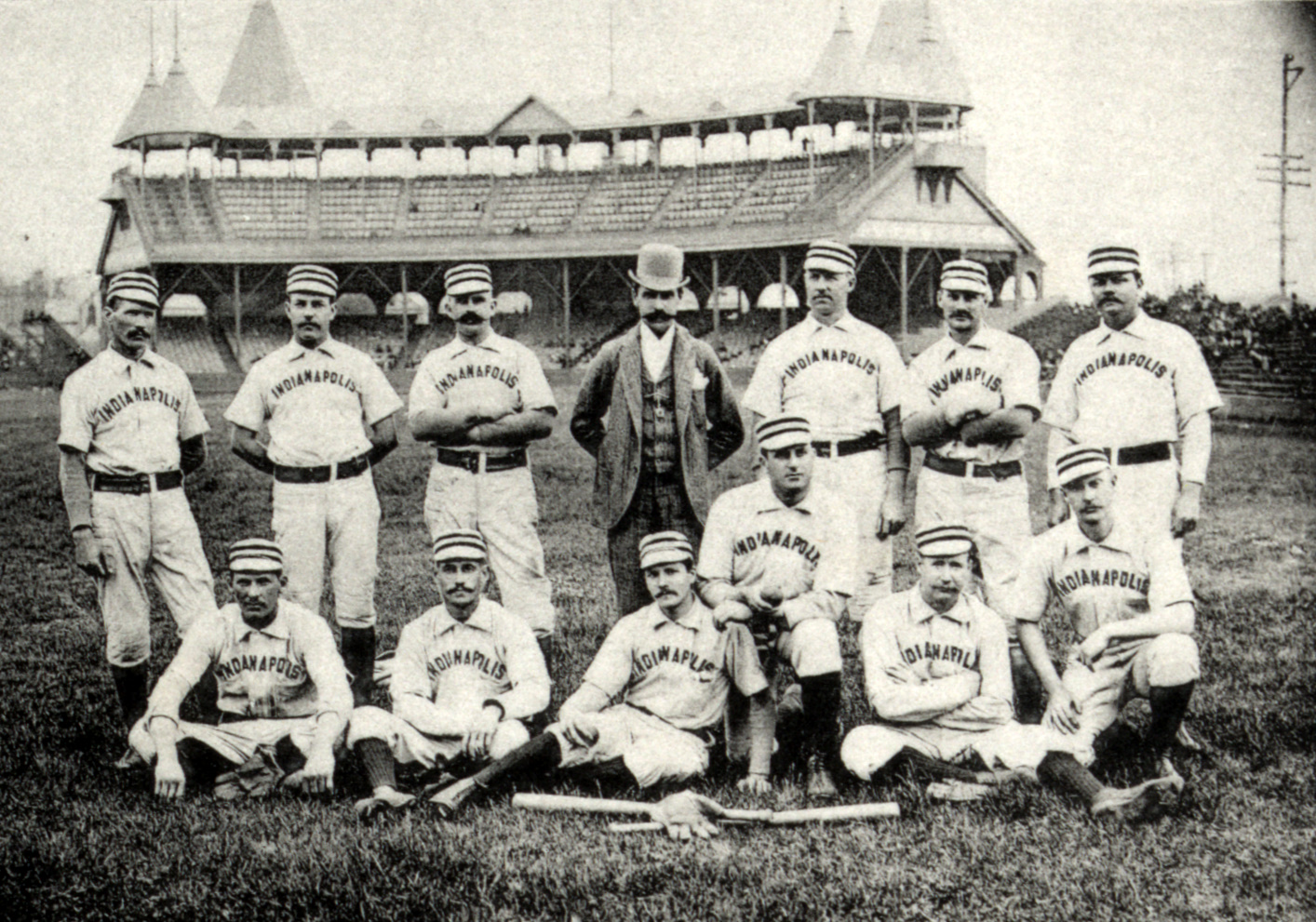
1888 Indianapolis Hoosiers

The St. Louis Maroons were a professional baseball club based in St. Louis, Missouri, from 1884 to 1886. The club, established by Henry Lucas, were the one near-major league quality entry in the Union Association, a league that lasted only one season, due in large part to the dominance of the Maroons. When the UA folded after playing just one season, the Maroons joined the National League. In 1887 the Maroons relocated to Indianapolis and became the Indianapolis Hoosiers, where they played three more seasons before folding.

== St. Louis Maroons ==
The St. Louis Maroons debuted on April 20, 1884, at the Union Base Ball Park, defeating Chicago Browns, 7–2.

Henry Lucas, the founder and president of the Union Association and owner of the Maroons, had stocked his team with most of the league's best talent. They started the season 20–0, a mark that would not be topped in major American professional sports until the Golden State Warriors of the NBA surpassed it 131 years later in the 2015–16 season. The mark has never been surpassed in Major League Baseball, with the closest teams being the 1982 Atlanta Braves, the 1987 Milwaukee Brewers, and the 2023 Tampa Bay Rays (who all started the season 13–0). The Maroons went 94–19 in that season, with their closest rivals, the Cincinnati Outlaw Reds, finishing 21 games behind.

For comparison, the Maroons' record would project to 135–27 under the modern schedule of 162 games, while Pythagorean expectation based on the Maroons' results (887 runs scored, 429 runs allowed) and a 162-game schedule would translate to a record of 132–30, but these results are of questionable merit, and serve to indicate something of the quality of the remainder of the organization, which many derided as the "Onion League".

One of the Maroons' major stars was pitcher Charlie Sweeney, best known today as the pitcher who left Old Hoss Radbourn to shoulder the pitching burden alone with the Providence Grays of the National League. Radbourn went on to pitch most of the rest of the Providence club's games, winning an MLB record total of 60. Sweeney won 24 with the Maroons after having already won 17 with the Grays, so he had a fair year as well.

After the Union Association collapsed, the National League was persuaded to bring the St. Louis Union entry into the established league, to try to provide some competition for the St. Louis Browns of the American Association. Unfortunately for the Maroons, the Browns were at the peak of their game, winning pennants four straight years (1885–1888). Meanwhile, the Maroons, facing much better competition in the National League, finished well off the National League pace in 1885 and 1886, not gaining anything in the latter season from new uniforms sporting large black diamonds on the chest.

Fred Dunlap hit for the cycle for the Maroons on May 24, 1886.

Following the 1886 season, the team was sold to the league, which in turn sold it to John T. Brush. He moved the team to Indianapolis, where they were renamed the Hoosiers. Brush owned the stadium in Indianapolis, which had been previously used by the previous Hoosier team.

== Indianapolis Hoosiers ==
This was the second major league team to bear the name Indianapolis Hoosiers, though they bore no relationship to the earlier team that played in 1884. The Hoosiers three seasons in the National League from 1887 to 1889 and posted records of 37–89 (8th), 50–85 (7th) and 59–75 (7th), respectively.

The team played its weekday home games at Athletic Park. Due to blue laws, the club staged Sunday games outside the city limits, at Bruce Grounds in 1887 and at Indianapolis Park during 1888–89. When the team folded, Brush became part-owner of the New York Giants.

Baseball Hall of Fame member Amos Rusie made his big league debut with the 1889 Hoosiers. Jack Glasscock hit for the cycle for the Hoosiers on August 8, 1889.

== Baseball Hall of Famers ==
St. Louis Maroons/Indianapolis Hoosiers Hall of Famers
Inductee	Position	Tenure	Inducted
Amos Rusie	P	1889	1977

== See also ==
- St. Louis Maroons/Indianapolis Hoosiers all-time roster
- 1884 St. Louis Maroons season
- 1885 St. Louis Maroons season
- 1886 St. Louis Maroons season
- 1887 Indianapolis Hoosiers season
- 1888 Indianapolis Hoosiers season
- 1889 Indianapolis Hoosiers season
