= 1888 Brooklyn Bridegrooms season =

1888 Brooklyn Bridegrooms
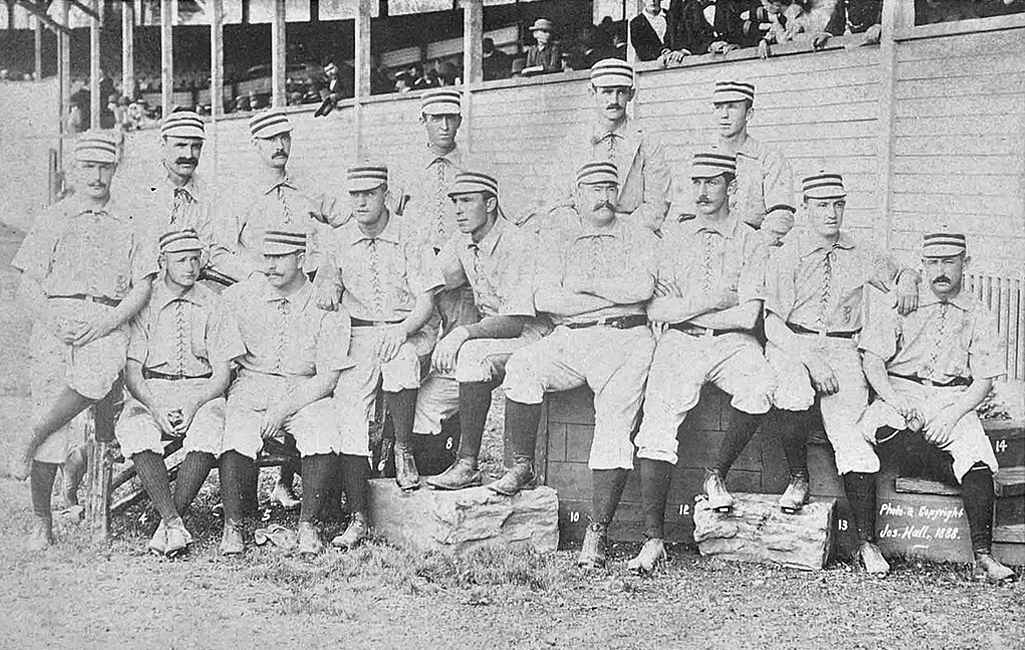
- League: American Association
- Ballpark: Washington Park
- City: Brooklyn, New York
- Record: 88–52 (.629)
- League place: 2nd
- Owners: Charles Byrne, Ferdinand Abell
- President: Charles Byrne
- Manager: Bill McGunnigle

With the 1888 season, the Brooklyn Grays underwent a name change to the Brooklyn Bridegrooms, a nickname that resulted from several team members getting married around the same time. Also, owner Charles Byrne decided to withdraw from managing the team's on field activities and turned the reins over to more experienced baseball manager Bill McGunnigle. That, along with the Bridegrooms' purchase of several top players from the defunct New York Metropolitans, led to a dramatic on field improvement as the team finished in second place in the American Association.

== Offseason ==
- October 20, 1887: Jim Donahue was purchased by the Bridegrooms from the New York Metropolitans for $25,000.
- October 20, 1887: Bill Fagan, Frank Hankinson, Bill Holbert, Al Mays, Darby O'Brien and Paul Radford were purchased by the Bridegrooms from the New York Metropolitans.
- November 21, 1887: Doc Bushong was purchased by the Bridegrooms from the St. Louis Browns.
- November 26, 1887: Bob Caruthers was purchased by the Bridegrooms from the St. Louis Browns.
- November 29, 1887: Dave Foutz was purchased by the Bridegrooms from the St. Louis Browns.
- January 15, 1888, Jim Donahue, Bill Fagan, Frank Hankinson, Bill Phillips, Henry Porter and Steve Toole were purchased from the Bridegrooms by the Kansas City Cowboys.
- February 1888: Bert Cunningham and John Harkins were purchased from the Bridegrooms by the Baltimore Orioles.
- February 15, 1888: Jim McTamany was purchased from the Bridegrooms by the Kansas City Cowboys.

== Regular season ==
=== Season standings ===
American Association
Team	W	L	Pct.	GB	Home	Road
St. Louis Browns	92	43	.681	—	60‍–‍21	32‍–‍22
Brooklyn Bridegrooms	88	52	.629	6½	53‍–‍20	35‍–‍32
Philadelphia Athletics	81	52	.609	10	55‍–‍20	26‍–‍32
Cincinnati Red Stockings	80	54	.597	11½	56‍–‍25	24‍–‍29
Baltimore Orioles	57	80	.416	36	30‍–‍26	27‍–‍54
Cleveland Blues	50	82	.379	40½	33‍–‍27	17‍–‍55
Louisville Colonels	48	87	.356	44	27‍–‍29	21‍–‍58
Kansas City Cowboys	43	89	.326	47½	23‍–‍34	20‍–‍55

=== Record vs. opponents ===
1888 American Association record Sources:
Team	BAL	BRO	CIN	CLE	KC	LOU	PHA	STL
Baltimore	—	8–12	6–14	10–9	11–8	11–9	5–14	6–14
Brooklyn	12–8	—	14–6–1	16–4	11–9	13–7	12–8–1	10–10–1
Cincinnati	14–6	6–14–1	—	10–7–1	15–4	17–3–1	10–10	8–10
Cleveland	9–10	4–16	7–10–1	—	10–9	9–8–2	7–13	4–16
Kansas City	8–11	9–11	4–15	9–10	—	6–12	3–14	4–16
Louisville	9–11	7–13	3–17–1	8–9–2	12–6	—	5–15–1	4–16
Philadelphia	14–5	8–12–1	10–10	13–7	14–3	15–5–1	—	7–10–1
St. Louis	14–6	10–10–1	10–8	16–4	16–4	16–4	10–7–1	—

== Notable transactions ==
- August 10, 1888: Oyster Burns was purchased by the Bridegrooms from the Baltimore Orioles.
- September 15, 1888: Bill McClellan was purchased from the Bridegrooms by the Cleveland Blues.
- September 23, 1888: Pop Corkhill was purchased by the Bridegrooms from the Cincinnati Red Stockings.
- September 30, 1888: Hub Collins was purchased by the Bridegrooms from the Louisville Colonels.

=== Roster ===
1888 Brooklyn Bridegrooms
Roster
Pitchers: Mickey Hughes; Al Mays; Adonis Terry	Catchers: Doc Bushong; Bob Clark; Bill Holbert; Jimmy Peoples	Infielders: Jack Burdock; Oyster Burns; Hub Collins; Bill McClellan; Dave Orr; George Pinkney; Germany Smith	Outfielders: Bob Caruthers; Pop Corkhill; Dave Foutz; Darby O'Brien; Paul Radford; Ed Silch	Manager: Bill McGunnigle

== Player stats ==
=== Batting ===
==== Starters by position ====
Note: Pos = Position; G = Games played; AB = At bats; R = Runs scored; H = Hits; Avg. = Batting average; HR = Home runs; RBI = Runs batted in; SB = Stolen bases

Pos	Player	G	AB	R	H	Avg.	HR	RBI	SB
C	Doc Bushong	69	253	23	53	.209	0	16	9
1B	Dave Orr	99	394	57	120	.305	1	59	11
2B	Jack Burdock	70	246	15	30	.122	1	8	9
3B	Germany Smith	103	402	47	86	.214	3	61	27
SS	George Pinkney	143	575	134	156	.271	4	52	51
OF	Darby O'Brien	136	532	105	149	.280	2	65	55
OF	Paul Radford	90	308	48	67	.218	2	29	33
OF	Dave Foutz	140	563	91	156	.277	3	99	35

==== Other batters ====
Note: G = Games played; AB = At bats; R = Runs scored; H = Hits; Avg. = Batting average; HR = Home runs; RBI = Runs batted in; SB = Stolen bases

Player	G	AB	R	H	Avg.	HR	RBI	SB
Bob Caruthers	94	335	58	77	.230	5	54	23
Bill McClellan	74	278	33	57	.205	0	21	13
Oyster Burns	52	204	40	58	.284	2	25	21
Bob Clark	45	150	23	36	.240	1	20	11
Jimmy Peoples	32	103	15	20	.194	0	17	10
Pop Corkhill	19	71	17	27	.380	1	19	3
Bill Holbert	15	50	4	6	.120	0	1	0
Ed Silch	14	48	5	13	.271	0	3	4
Hub Collins	12	42	16	13	.310	0	3	9

=== Pitching ===
==== Starting pitchers ====
Note: G = Games pitched; GS = Games started; IP = Innings pitched; W = Wins; L = Losses; ERA = Earned run average; BB = Bases on balls; SO = Strikeouts; CG = Complete games

Player	G	GS	IP	W	L	ERA	BB	SO	CG
Bob Caruthers	44	42	391.2	29	15	2.39	53	140	42
Mickey Hughes	40	40	363.0	25	13	2.13	98	159	40
Adonis Terry	23	23	195.0	13	8	2.03	67	138	20
Dave Foutz	23	19	176.0	12	7	2.51	35	73	19
Al Mays	18	18	160.2	9	9	2.80	32	67	17
