= 1888 Baltimore Orioles season =

1888 Baltimore Orioles
- League: American Association
- Ballpark: Oriole Park
- City: Baltimore, Maryland
- Record: 57–80 (.416)
- League place: 5th
- Owner: Harry Von der Horst
- Manager: Billy Barnie

== Regular season ==
=== Season standings ===
American Association
Team	W	L	Pct.	GB	Home	Road
St. Louis Browns	92	43	.681	—	60‍–‍21	32‍–‍22
Brooklyn Bridegrooms	88	52	.629	6½	53‍–‍20	35‍–‍32
Philadelphia Athletics	81	52	.609	10	55‍–‍20	26‍–‍32
Cincinnati Red Stockings	80	54	.597	11½	56‍–‍25	24‍–‍29
Baltimore Orioles	57	80	.416	36	30‍–‍26	27‍–‍54
Cleveland Blues	50	82	.379	40½	33‍–‍27	17‍–‍55
Louisville Colonels	48	87	.356	44	27‍–‍29	21‍–‍58
Kansas City Cowboys	43	89	.326	47½	23‍–‍34	20‍–‍55

=== Record vs. opponents ===
1888 American Association record Sources:
Team	BAL	BRO	CIN	CLE	KC	LOU	PHA	STL
Baltimore	—	8–12	6–14	10–9	11–8	11–9	5–14	6–14
Brooklyn	12–8	—	14–6–1	16–4	11–9	13–7	12–8–1	10–10–1
Cincinnati	14–6	6–14–1	—	10–7–1	15–4	17–3–1	10–10	8–10
Cleveland	9–10	4–16	7–10–1	—	10–9	9–8–2	7–13	4–16
Kansas City	8–11	9–11	4–15	9–10	—	6–12	3–14	4–16
Louisville	9–11	7–13	3–17–1	8–9–2	12–6	—	5–15–1	4–16
Philadelphia	14–5	8–12–1	10–10	13–7	14–3	15–5–1	—	7–10–1
St. Louis	14–6	10–10–1	10–8	16–4	16–4	16–4	10–7–1	—

=== Roster ===
1888 Baltimore Orioles
Roster
Pitchers: Bert Cunningham; John Harkins; Matt Kilroy; Mike Kilroy; Sam Shaw; Phenomenal Smith; George Walker; Pat Whitaker	Catchers: Bart Cantz; Chris Fulmer; Jack O'Brien; Sam Trott; Infielders: George Bradley; Jack Farrell; Bill Greenwood; Billy Shindle; Tommy Tucker	Outfielders: Oyster Burns; Walt Goldsby; Mike Griffin; John Peltz; Blondie Purcell; Joe Sommer	Manager: Billy Barnie

== Player stats ==
=== Batting ===
==== Starters by position ====
Note: Pos = Position; G = Games played; AB = At bats; H = Hits; Avg. = Batting average; HR = Home runs; RBI = Runs batted in

Pos	Player	G	AB	H	Avg.	HR	RBI
C	Chris Fulmer	52	166	31	.187	0	10
1B	Tommy Tucker	136	520	149	.287	6	61
2B	Bill Greenwood	115	409	78	.191	0	29
SS	Jack Farrell	103	398	81	.204	4	36
3B	Billy Shindle	135	514	107	.208	1	53
OF	Mike Griffin	137	542	139	.256	0	46
OF	Blondie Purcell	101	406	96	.236	2	39
OF	Oyster Burns	79	325	97	.298	4	42

==== Other batters ====
Note: G = Games played; AB = At bats; H = Hits; Avg. = Batting average; HR = Home runs; RBI = Runs batted in

Player	G	AB	H	Avg.	HR	RBI
Joe Sommer	79	297	65	.219	0	35
Jack O'Brien	57	196	44	.224	0	18
Walt Goldsby	46	165	39	.236	0	14
Bart Cantz	37	126	21	.167	0	9
Sam Trott	31	108	30	.278	0	22
John Peltz	1	4	1	.250	0	0
George Bradley	1	3	0	.000	0	0

=== Pitching ===
==== Starting pitchers ====
Note: G = Games pitched; IP = Innings pitched; W = Wins; L = Losses; ERA = Earned run average; SO = Strikeouts

Player	G	IP	W	L	ERA	SO
Bert Cunningham	51	453.1	22	29	3.39	186
Matt Kilroy	40	321.0	17	21	4.04	135
Phenomenal Smith	35	292.0	14	19	3.61	152
Sam Shaw	6	53.0	2	4	3.40	22
George Walker	4	35.0	1	3	5.91	18
Pat Whitaker	2	14.0	1	1	5.14	5
Mike Kilroy	1	9.0	0	1	8.00	1
John Harkins	1	8.0	0	1	6.75	2

==== Relief pitchers ====
Note: G = Games pitched; W = Wins; L = Losses; SV = Saves; ERA = Earned run average; SO = Strikeouts

Player	G	W	L	SV	ERA	SO
Oyster Burns	5	0	1	0	4.26	2
Tommy Tucker	1	0	0	0	3.86	2
