= 1888 Kansas City Cowboys season =

1888 Kansas City Cowboys
- League: American Association
- Ballpark: Association Park
- City: Kansas City, Missouri
- Record: 43–89 (.326)
- League place: 8th
- Managers: Dave Rowe, Sam Barkley, Bill Watkins

The 1888 Kansas City Cowboys baseball team finished with a 43–89 record, winding up in last place in the American Association during their debut season.

The team played their final game of the season at future home ballpark, Exposition Park.

== Regular season ==
=== Season standings ===
American Association
| Team | W | L | Pct. | GB | Home | Road |
|---|---|---|---|---|---|---|
| St. Louis Browns | 92 | 43 | .681 | — | 60‍–‍21 | 32‍–‍22 |
| Brooklyn Bridegrooms | 88 | 52 | .629 | 6½ | 53‍–‍20 | 35‍–‍32 |
| Philadelphia Athletics | 81 | 52 | .609 | 10 | 55‍–‍20 | 26‍–‍32 |
| Cincinnati Red Stockings | 80 | 54 | .597 | 11½ | 56‍–‍25 | 24‍–‍29 |
| Baltimore Orioles | 57 | 80 | .416 | 36 | 30‍–‍26 | 27‍–‍54 |
| Cleveland Blues | 50 | 82 | .379 | 40½ | 33‍–‍27 | 17‍–‍55 |
| Louisville Colonels | 48 | 87 | .356 | 44 | 27‍–‍29 | 21‍–‍58 |
| Kansas City Cowboys | 43 | 89 | .326 | 47½ | 23‍–‍34 | 20‍–‍55 |

=== Record vs. opponents ===
1888 American Association record Sources:
| Team | BAL | BRO | CIN | CLE | KC | LOU | PHA | STL |
|---|---|---|---|---|---|---|---|---|
| Baltimore | — | 8–12 | 6–14 | 10–9 | 11–8 | 11–9 | 5–14 | 6–14 |
| Brooklyn | 12–8 | — | 14–6–1 | 16–4 | 11–9 | 13–7 | 12–8–1 | 10–10–1 |
| Cincinnati | 14–6 | 6–14–1 | — | 10–7–1 | 15–4 | 17–3–1 | 10–10 | 8–10 |
| Cleveland | 9–10 | 4–16 | 7–10–1 | — | 10–9 | 9–8–2 | 7–13 | 4–16 |
| Kansas City | 8–11 | 9–11 | 4–15 | 9–10 | — | 6–12 | 3–14 | 4–16 |
| Louisville | 9–11 | 7–13 | 3–17–1 | 8–9–2 | 12–6 | — | 5–15–1 | 4–16 |
| Philadelphia | 14–5 | 8–12–1 | 10–10 | 13–7 | 14–3 | 15–5–1 | — | 7–10–1 |
| St. Louis | 14–6 | 10–10–1 | 10–8 | 16–4 | 16–4 | 16–4 | 10–7–1 | — |

=== Roster ===
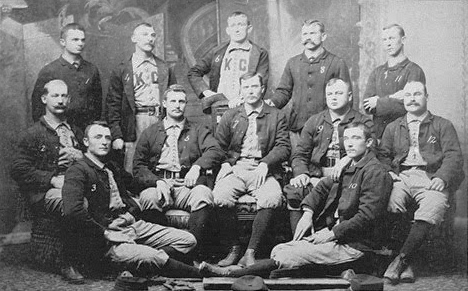
1888 Kansas City Cowboys team photograph

1888 Kansas City Cowboys
Roster
| Pitchers: Bill Fagan; Frank Hafner; Frank Hoffman; John Kirby; Henry Porter; Tom Sullivan; Steve Toole | Catchers: Jack Brennan; Fatty Briody; Jim Donahue; Charlie Hoover; Infielders: Sam Barkley; Jumbo Davis; Henry Easterday; Frank Hankinson; Bill Phillips | Outfielders: Myron Allen; Jim Burns; Monk Cline; Law Daniels; Red Ehret; Ed Glenn; Billy Hamilton; Charley Jones; Jim McTamany; Dave Rowe | Manager: Dave Rowe; Sam Barkley; Bill Watkins |

== Player stats ==
=== Batting ===
==== Starters by position ====
Note: Pos = Position; G = Games played; AB = At bats; H = Hits; Avg. = Batting average; HR = Home runs; RBI = Runs batted in

| Pos | Player | G | AB | H | Avg. | HR | RBI |
|---|---|---|---|---|---|---|---|
| C | Jim Donahue | 88 | 337 | 79 | .234 | 1 | 28 |
| 1B | Bill Phillips | 129 | 509 | 120 | .236 | 1 | 56 |
| 2B | Sam Barkley | 116 | 482 | 104 | .216 | 4 | 51 |
| 3B | Jumbo Davis | 121 | 491 | 131 | .267 | 3 | 61 |
| SS | Henry Easterday | 115 | 401 | 76 | .190 | 3 | 37 |
| OF | Myron Allen | 37 | 136 | 29 | .213 | 0 | 10 |
| OF | Jim McTamany | 130 | 516 | 127 | .246 | 4 | 41 |
| OF | Monk Cline | 73 | 293 | 69 | .235 | 0 | 19 |

==== Other batters ====
Note: G = Games played; AB = At bats; H = Hits; Avg. = Batting average; HR = Home runs; RBI = Runs batted in

| Player | G | AB | H | Avg. | HR | RBI |
|---|---|---|---|---|---|---|
| Law Daniels | 61 | 218 | 45 | .206 | 2 | 28 |
| Frank Hankinson | 37 | 155 | 27 | .174 | 1 | 20 |
| Billy Hamilton | 35 | 129 | 34 | .264 | 0 | 11 |
| Dave Rowe | 32 | 122 | 21 | .172 | 0 | 13 |
| Jack Brennan | 34 | 118 | 20 | .169 | 0 | 6 |
| Jim Burns | 16 | 66 | 20 | .303 | 0 | 4 |
| Red Ehret | 17 | 63 | 12 | .190 | 0 | 4 |
| Fatty Briody | 13 | 48 | 10 | .208 | 0 | 8 |
| Charley Jones | 6 | 25 | 4 | .160 | 0 | 5 |
| Charlie Hoover | 3 | 10 | 3 | .300 | 0 | 1 |
| Ed Glenn | 3 | 8 | 0 | .000 | 0 | 0 |

=== Pitching ===
==== Starting pitchers ====
Note: G = Games pitched; IP = Innings pitched; W = Wins; L = Losses; ERA = Earned run average; SO = Strikeouts

| Player | G | IP | W | L | ERA | SO |
|---|---|---|---|---|---|---|
| Henry Porter | 55 | 474.0 | 18 | 37 | 4.16 | 145 |
| Tom Sullivan | 24 | 214.2 | 8 | 16 | 3.40 | 84 |
| Bill Fagan | 17 | 142.1 | 5 | 11 | 5.69 | 49 |
| Frank Hoffman | 12 | 104.0 | 3 | 9 | 5.69 | 49 |
| Steve Toole | 12 | 91.2 | 5 | 6 | 6.68 | 35 |
| Red Ehret | 7 | 52.0 | 3 | 2 | 3.98 | 12 |
| John Kirby | 5 | 43.0 | 1 | 4 | 4.19 | 11 |
| Myron Allen | 2 | 18.0 | 0 | 2 | 2.50 | 2 |
| Frank Hafner | 2 | 18.0 | 0 | 2 | 7.00 | 5 |
