= 1888 Louisville Colonels season =

1888 Louisville Colonels
- League: American Association
- Ballpark: Eclipse Park
- City: Louisville, Kentucky
- Record: 48–87 (.356)
- League place: 7th
- Owners: W. L. Lyons, Zach Phelps, W. L. Jackson, John Phelps, Mordecai Davidson, John R. Botto
- Managers: Kick Kelly, Mordecai Davidson, John Kerins

The 1888 Louisville Colonels season was a season in American baseball. The team was coming off a strong 1887 season, in which it won 76 games and lost 60 under new manager John "Kick" Kelly, but the 1888 season proved to be a disappointment. The team's primary problem was a lack of quality pitching. The best pitcher, Thomas "Toad" Ramsey, had won 37 games in 1887; in 1888, plagued by a sore arm, he won only 8. None of the other pitchers proved capable of picking up the slack. The 1888 Colonels finished with a 58–87 record, seventh place in the American Association.

== Regular season ==
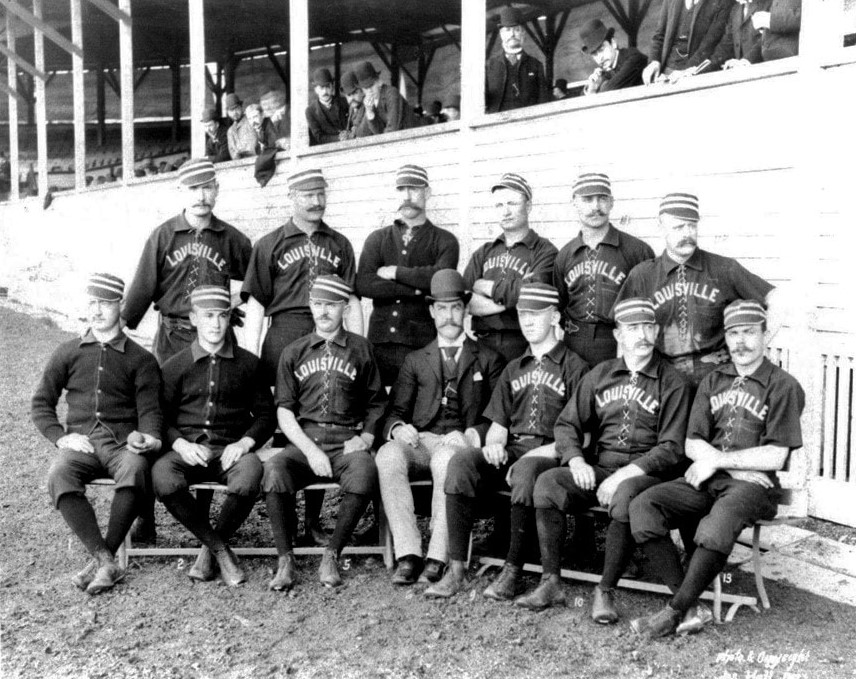
1888 Louisville Colonels

On June 7, shareholder Mordecai Davidson bought out most of the other shareholders, appointing himself president and John R. Botto vice-president. Two days later, he officially took over as manager as well. John Kerins, among others, served as team captain, guiding the team's on-field activities.

The most famous member of the 1888 Colonels was outfielder Pete Browning, a ferocious hitter who was noted for excessive drinking and peculiar behavior. One of the best-known stories about Browning concerns an incident which occurred in Kansas City on June 19 of the 1888 season. Browning got up in a Kansas City hotel that morning, following a heavy rainstorm. The gutter in front of the hotel had been overwhelmed by the rain; there was a large puddle of water there. The drunken Browning purchased some fishing gear and tried his hand at fishing in the gutter. It's unclear whether he did this as a joke or whether he really believed that he could catch fish in the gutter, but in any event, the gutter-fishing incident became one of the most often-repeated Pete Browning stories. It's documented in the Louisville Courier-Journal.

=== Season standings ===
American Association
Team	W	L	Pct.	GB	Home	Road
St. Louis Browns	92	43	.681	—	60‍–‍21	32‍–‍22
Brooklyn Bridegrooms	88	52	.629	6½	53‍–‍20	35‍–‍32
Philadelphia Athletics	81	52	.609	10	55‍–‍20	26‍–‍32
Cincinnati Red Stockings	80	54	.597	11½	56‍–‍25	24‍–‍29
Baltimore Orioles	57	80	.416	36	30‍–‍26	27‍–‍54
Cleveland Blues	50	82	.379	40½	33‍–‍27	17‍–‍55
Louisville Colonels	48	87	.356	44	27‍–‍29	21‍–‍58
Kansas City Cowboys	43	89	.326	47½	23‍–‍34	20‍–‍55

=== Record vs. opponents ===
1888 American Association record Sources:
Team	BAL	BRO	CIN	CLE	KC	LOU	PHA	STL
Baltimore	—	8–12	6–14	10–9	11–8	11–9	5–14	6–14
Brooklyn	12–8	—	14–6–1	16–4	11–9	13–7	12–8–1	10–10–1
Cincinnati	14–6	6–14–1	—	10–7–1	15–4	17–3–1	10–10	8–10
Cleveland	9–10	4–16	7–10–1	—	10–9	9–8–2	7–13	4–16
Kansas City	8–11	9–11	4–15	9–10	—	6–12	3–14	4–16
Louisville	9–11	7–13	3–17–1	8–9–2	12–6	—	5–15–1	4–16
Philadelphia	14–5	8–12–1	10–10	13–7	14–3	15–5–1	—	7–10–1
St. Louis	14–6	10–10–1	10–8	16–4	16–4	16–4	10–7–1	—

=== Roster ===
1888 Louisville Colonels
Roster
Pitchers: Ice Box Chamberlain; Billy Crowell; John Ewing; Toad Ramsey; Catchers: Paul Cook; Lave Cross	Infielders: Wally Andrews; Dude Esterbrook; Guy Hecker; Reddy Mack; Harry Raymond; Phil Reccius; Skyrocket Smith; Phil Tomney; Joe Werrick; Bill White	Outfielders: Pete Browning; Hercules Burnett; Hub Collins; Joe Cross; Eddie Fusselback; John Kerins; Thomas Long; Scott Stratton; Farmer Vaughn; Farmer Weaver; Jimmy Wolf	Manager: Mordecai Davidson; Kick Kelly; John Kerins

== Player stats ==
=== Batting ===
==== Starters by position ====
Note: Pos = Position; G = Games played; AB = At bats; H = Hits; Avg. = Batting average; HR = Home runs; RBI = Runs batted in

Pos	Player	G	AB	H	Avg.	HR	RBI
C	Paul Cook	57	185	34	.184	0	13
1B	Skyrocket Smith	58	206	49	.238	1	31
2B	Reddy Mack	112	446	97	.217	3	34
3B	Joe Werrick	111	413	89	.215	0	51
SS	Bill White	49	198	55	.278	1	30
OF	Chicken Wolf	128	538	154	.286	0	67
OF	Pete Browning	99	383	120	.313	3	72
OF	Hub Collins	116	485	149	.307	2	50

==== Other batters ====
Note: G = Games played; AB = At bats; H = Hits; Avg. = Batting average; HR = Home runs; RBI = Runs batted in

Player	G	AB	H	Avg.	HR	RBI
John Kerins	83	319	75	.235	2	41
Guy Hecker	56	211	48	.227	0	29
Farmer Vaughn	51	189	37	.196	1	21
Lave Cross	46	180	41	.228	0	15
Harry Raymond	32	123	26	.211	0	13
Phil Tomney	34	120	18	.150	0	4
Farmer Weaver	26	112	28	.250	0	8
Wally Andrews	26	93	18	.194	0	6
Dude Esterbrook	23	93	21	.226	0	7
Phil Reccius	2	9	2	.222	0	4
Hercules Burnett	1	4	0	.000	0	0
Eddie Fusselback	1	4	1	.250	0	1
Thomas Long	1	2	0	.000	0	0
Joe Cross	1	1	0	.000	0	0

=== Pitching ===
==== Starting pitchers ====
Note: G = Games pitched; IP = Innings pitched; W = Wins; L = Losses; ERA = Earned run average; SO = Strikeouts

Player	G	IP	W	L	ERA	SO
Toad Ramsey	40	342.1	8	30	3.42	228
Scott Stratton	33	269.2	10	17	3.64	97
Guy Hecker	26	223.1	8	17	3.39	63
Ice Box Chamberlain	24	196.0	14	9	2.53	119
John Ewing	21	191.0	8	13	2.83	87
Billy Crowell	1	9.0	0	1	6.00	5
