= List of Major League Baseball career complete games leaders =

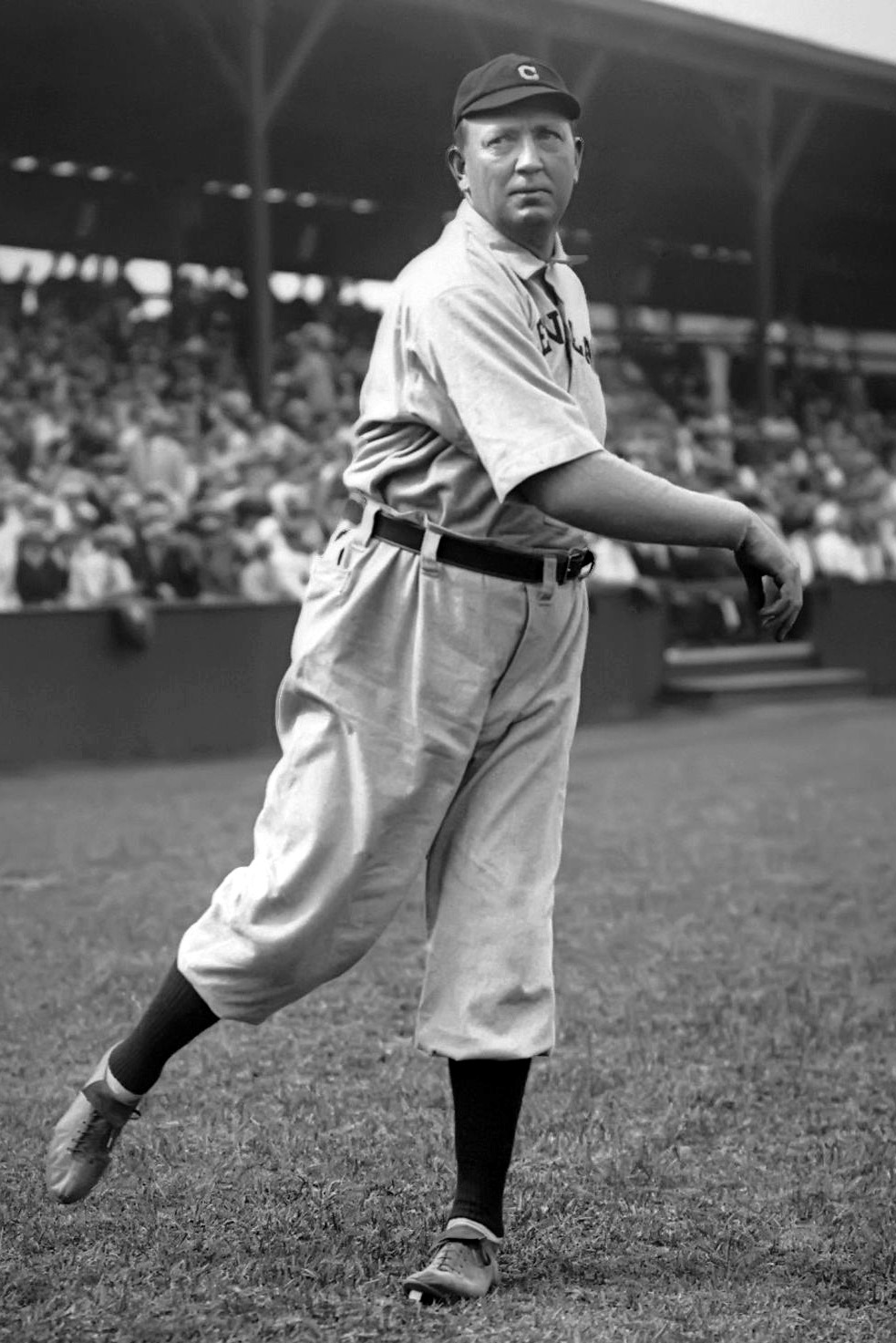
Cy Young, the all-time leader in complete games.

In baseball, a complete game (denoted by CG) is the act of a pitcher pitching an entire game without the benefit of a closer. A pitcher who meets this criterion will be credited with a complete game regardless of the number of innings played - pitchers who throw an entire official game that is shortened by rain will still be credited with a complete game, while starting pitchers who are relieved in extra innings after throwing nine or more innings will not be credited with a complete game. A starting pitcher who is replaced by a pinch hitter in the final half inning of a game will still be credited with a complete game.

Cy Young is the all-time leader in complete games with 749 and the only player to complete more than 700 games. Pud Galvin is second all-time with 646 career complete games and the only other player to complete more than 600 games. No active pitcher has yet to even reach 30 career complete games.

== Key ==
Rank	Rank amongst leaders in career complete games. A blank field indicates a tie.
Player	Name of the player.
CG	Total career complete games.
*	Denotes elected to National Baseball Hall of Fame.

== List ==
Rank	Player	CG
1	Cy Young*	749
2	Pud Galvin*	646
3	Tim Keefe*	554
4	Kid Nichols*	532
5	Walter Johnson*	531
6	Bobby Mathews	525
	Mickey Welch*	525
8	Charles Radbourn*	488
9	John Clarkson*	485
10	Tony Mullane	468
11	Jim McCormick	466
12	Gus Weyhing	449
13	Grover Cleveland Alexander*	436
14	Christy Mathewson*	435
15	Jack Powell	422
16	Eddie Plank*	410
17	Will White	394
18	Amos Rusie*	393
19	Vic Willis*	388
20	Tommy Bond	386
21	Warren Spahn*	382
22	Jim Whitney	377
23	Adonis Terry	367
24	Ted Lyons*	356
25	George Mullin	353
26	Charlie Buffinton	351
27	Chick Fraser	342
28	Clark Griffith*	337
29	Red Ruffing*	335
30	Silver King	328
31	Al Orth	324
32	Bill Hutchison	321
33	Burleigh Grimes*	314
	Joe McGinnity*	314
35	Red Donahue	312
	Guy Hecker	312
37	Bill Dinneen	306
38	Robin Roberts*	305
39	Gaylord Perry*	303
40	George Bradley	302
41	Ted Breitenstein	301
42	Bob Caruthers	298
	Lefty Grove*	298
44	Pink Hawley	297
	Ed Morris	297
46	Mark Baldwin	295
47	Brickyard Kennedy	294
48	Eppa Rixey*	290
49	Bill Donovan	289
	Early Wynn*	289

Rank	Player	CG
51	Bert Cunningham	287
52	Wilbur Cooper	279
	Bob Feller*	279
	Sadie McMahon	279
	Al Spalding*	279
	Jack Taylor	279
57	Jack Stivetts	278
58	Pretzels Getzien	277
59	Red Faber*	273
60	Mordecai Brown*	271
	Frank Dwyer	271
62	Jouett Meekin	270
63	Fergie Jenkins*	267
64	Ice Box Chamberlain	264
	Matt Kilroy	264
	Jesse Tannehill	264
67	Doc White	262
68	Rube Waddell*	261
69	Jack Chesbro*	260
	Red Ehret	260
	Carl Hubbell*	260
72	Larry Corcoran	256
73	Chief Bender*	255
	Bob Gibson*	255
75	Steve Carlton*	254
76	Frank Killen	253
	Win Mercer	253
78	Paul Derringer	251
79	Sad Sam Jones	250
	Ed Walsh*	250
81	Eddie Cicotte	249
	Herb Pennock*	249
	Stump Weidman	249
84	Bobo Newsom	246
85	Hooks Dauss	245
	Phil Niekro*	245
	John Montgomery Ward*	245
88	Harry Howell	244
	Juan Marichal*	244
90	Jack Quinn	243
91	Bert Blyleven*	242
	Deacon Phillippe	242
	Bucky Walters	242
94	Sam Leever	241
95	Kid Gleason	240
96	Addie Joss*	234
97	Candy Cummings*	233
98	Harry Staley	232
	George Uhle	232
100	Carl Mays	231
	Tom Seaver*	231

== Sources ==
- "Career Leaders & Records for Complete Games". Baseball-Reference.com.
