= Thomas Long (baseball) =

American baseball player (1860–1914)

- Right Fielder
- Born: November 1860; Philadelphia, Pennsylvania
- Died: December 15, 1914 (aged 54); Norristown, Pennsylvania
- Batted: Unknown Threw: Unknown

MLB debut
- August 29, 1888, for the Louisville Colonels

Last MLB appearance
- August 29, 1888, for the Louisville Colonels

MLB statistics
- Batting average: .000
- Home runs: 0
- RBI: 0
- Stats at Baseball Reference

Teams
- Louisville Colonels (1888)

Thomas L. Long (November 1860–December 15, 1914) was an American professional baseball player who played one game in the American Association for the 1888 Louisville Colonels as a right fielder. Previously, Long was thought to be among the Major League Baseball players with unidentified given names, but further research revealed that he was Thomas Long, who had previously played in the minor leagues for the Peoria Reds of the Northwestern League in 1884, the Wilmington Blue Hens of the Eastern League in 1885, and a team representing Bradford, Pennsylvania in the Pennsylvania State Association in 1887. In his single game in the major leagues, Long had three plate appearances, walked once, and struck out once.
