= Weyhing =

Weyhing is a surname. Notable people with the surname include:

- Gus Weyhing (1866–1955), American baseball pitcher, brother of John
- John Weyhing (1869–1890), American baseball pitcher, brother of Gus
