= Mike Kilroy =

American baseball player (1869–1960)

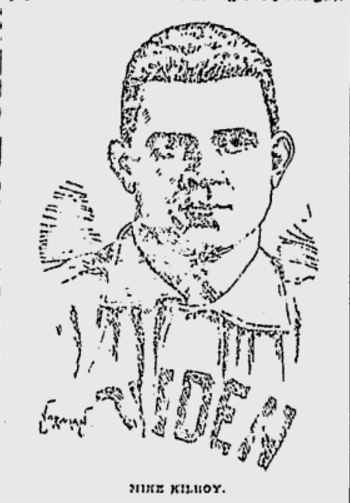
- Pitcher
- Born: November 4, 1869; Philadelphia, Pennsylvania, U.S.
- Died: October 2, 1960 (aged 90); Philadelphia, Pennsylvania, U.S.
- Batted: Right Threw: Right

MLB debut
- September 1, 1888, for the Baltimore Orioles

Last MLB appearance
- May 8, 1891, for the Philadelphia Phillies

MLB statistics
- Win–loss record: 0–3
- Earned run average: 9.00
- Strikeouts: 4
- Stats at Baseball Reference

Teams
- Baltimore Orioles (1888); Philadelphia Phillies (1891)

Michael Joseph Kilroy (November 4, 1869 – October 2, 1960) was an American Major League Baseball pitcher. He was the brother of Matt Kilroy. Kilroy played two seasons in the Majors, with the Baltimore Orioles in 1888 and the Philadelphia Phillies in 1891. He pitched four career games with an 0–3 record and an ERA of 9.00. His brother, Matt, also played in the majors.
