= Ice Box Chamberlain =

American baseball player (1867–1929)

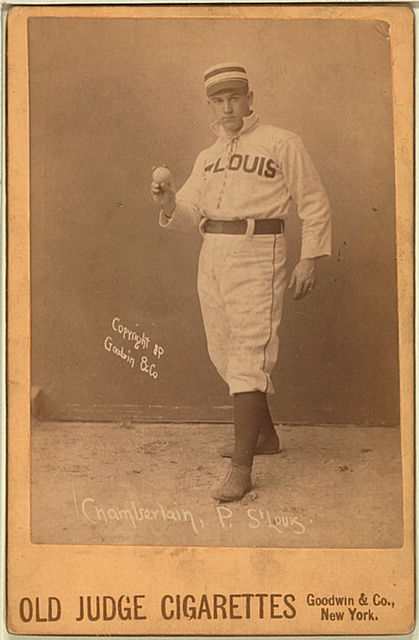
- Pitcher
- Born: November 5, 1867; Warsaw, New York, U.S.
- Died: September 22, 1929 (aged 61); Baltimore, Maryland, U.S.
- Batted: Right Threw: Right

MLB debut
- September 13, 1886, for the Louisville Colonels

Last MLB appearance
- May 13, 1896, for the Cleveland Spiders

MLB statistics
- Win–loss record: 157–120
- Earned run average: 3.57
- Strikeouts: 1,133
- Stats at Baseball Reference

Teams
- Louisville Colonels (1886–1888); St. Louis Browns (1888–1890); Columbus Solons (1890); Philadelphia Athletics (1891); Cincinnati Reds (1892–1894); Cleveland Spiders (1896)

Elton P. "Ice Box" Chamberlain (November 5, 1867 – September 22, 1929) was an American professional baseball player. He played in the major leagues as a right-handed pitcher during 1886–1896. In several seasons, Chamberlain finished in his league's top ten in a number of pitching categories, including wins, earned run average, strikeouts, and shutouts. During one of his best seasons, the 1888 St. Louis Browns won the American Association pennant with a 92–43 record. Normally a right-handed pitcher, Chamberlain pitched the last two innings of an 1888 game with his left hand, making him a rare example of a switch pitcher.

Chamberlain finished his major-league baseball career with 264 complete games out of his 301 games started. After his playing days, he was hired as a baseball umpire and later announced he was becoming a boxer, but neither venture appears to have worked out. Not much is known about Chamberlain's later life. He died in Baltimore in 1929.

== Early life and career ==
Chamberlain was born on November 5, 1867, in Warsaw, New York. He was one of six children born to veterinary surgeon Irving Chamberlain and his wife Carrie. Moving to Buffalo as a child, Chamberlain began to play organized baseball as a teenager. His early professional career included stints with a minor league team in Hamilton, Ontario, and with a Southern League team in Macon, Georgia. As a 17-year-old pitcher with Hamilton, he earned 18 wins and led the league in strikeouts.

Chamberlain made his major league debut with the Louisville Colonels of the American Association on September 13, 1886. In early October, Chamberlain was pitching in a game against the Baltimore Orioles when Louisville players began to complain opposing pitcher Matt Kilroy was leaving the pitcher's box when he threw the ball. When the umpire did not respond to Louisville's complaints, Chamberlain's manager told him to run forward out of the box when he let go of his pitches. The move "scared the Baltimore batters out of their wits" and Kilroy did not deliver any more questionable pitches.

In 1887, Chamberlain won 18 games for Louisville. The right-hander, who stood 5 ft 9 in (1.75 m) and weighed 168 lbs., earned the nickname "Ice Box". Some sources attribute the nickname to his ability to remain cool when facing tough opposition, but at least one source links the nickname to chronic laziness. On May 9, 1888, while pitching against the Kansas City Cowboys, Chamberlain pitched righthanded for the first seven innings and lefthanded for the last two innings. Louisville won the game by a score of 18–6. He was the third major league pitcher to throw with both his left and right hands during the same game. That feat was not repeated in the major leagues until Greg Harris, with the Montreal Expos, switched arms for the ninth inning of a 1995 game.

Chamberlain was traded to the St. Louis Browns in August 1888, having already registered 14 wins for the Colonels that year. He earned 11 more wins in the last six weeks of the season. He struck out 176 batters and registered a 2.19 earned run average that season, good for fifth among the league's pitchers. The Browns finished 1888 with a fourth consecutive league pennant. However, not long after Chamberlain joined the club, pitcher Nat Hudson left the team to get married. In the World Series, the Browns had only Chamberlain and pitcher Silver King to face a trio of New York Giants pitchers that included future Hall of Famer Tim Keefe.

After Chamberlain pitched a shutout in the second game of the 1888 World Series, he lost the fourth, sixth and eighth games. Chamberlain gave up 11 runs in the eighth game. Though the Giants clinched the series after that game, they played a full ten games, with Chamberlain winning the last game. The series was Chamberlain's last major league postseason playing appearance.

== Middle career ==
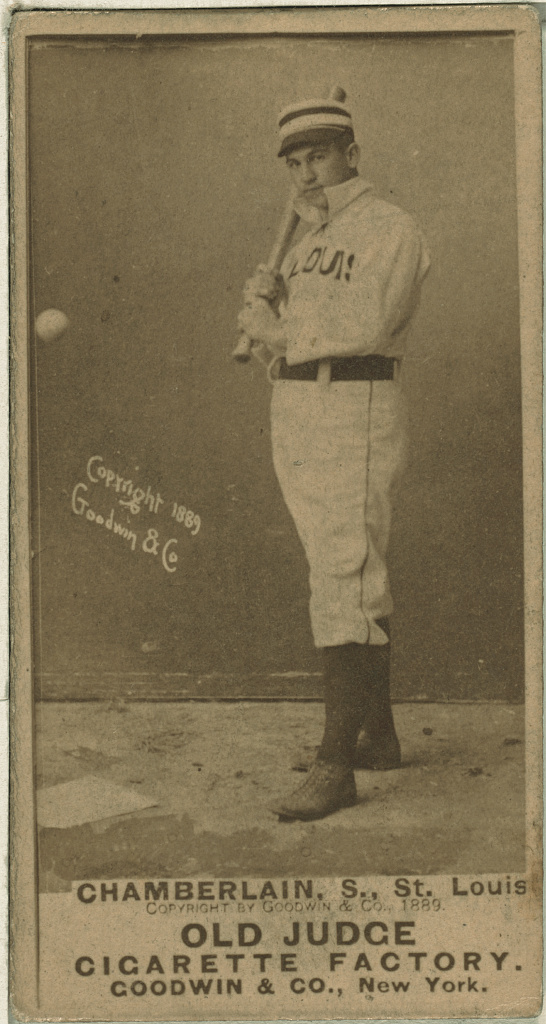
1889 baseball card of Chamberlain

The Cincinnati Reds talked to St. Louis about acquiring Chamberlain in 1889, but Cincinnati balked when St. Louis asked $8,000 for him. That year, Chamberlain pitched in a career-high 53 games and finished with 32 wins; his win total was the third highest in the league. Following the 1889 season, a new major league was forming known as the Players' League. A players association known as the Brotherhood of Professional Ball Players had served as a union and bargaining agent since the mid-1880s; now the group's new league was attempting to compete with established baseball. Browns owner Chris von der Ahe was afraid that Chamberlain would jump to the Chicago team in the new league; the manager of the Browns from the previous season, Charles Comiskey, had been hired there. Von der Ahe agreed to match the $800 pay increase that Chamberlain would have gotten in Chicago.

Chamberlain had returned to Buffalo by May 1890, where he was reported to be hanging out in pool rooms. Rumors held that Chamberlain wanted to join the Brotherhood and that he was "playing for his release." He was sold to the Columbus Solons (also of the American Association) the next month. Chamberlain had appeared in five games for St. Louis and pitched in 25 more for Columbus by the end of the season. He finished the year with a league-leading six shutouts. In February 1891, Chamberlain pleaded guilty to a charge of aiding and abetting a prize fight. He received a $50 fine and the Columbus team declared that they would not retain him for the 1891 season.

The Philadelphia Athletics indicated immediate interest in Chamberlain, hoping that he would pitch most of the team's games. Chamberlain earned a 22–23 win–loss record in 1891. He was the losing pitcher in the last of 485 shutouts recorded in the few seasons of American Association play. In August, he gave up the longest home run that had been hit at Boston's Congress Street Grounds. Chamberlain pitched for the NL's Cincinnati Reds in 1892, compiling a 19–23 record. In May of that season, Chamberlain pitched in an unusual game that was suspended due to sunlight; the scoreless game was in extra innings when umpire Jack Sheridan ruled that the sun was too bright for players to see the ball. The 1892 Reds finished with an overall record of 82–68. League officials split the season into two halves and the Reds finished fourth and eighth in the respective halves.

Before the 1893 season, Chamberlain indicated his displeasure with the climate in Cincinnati and said that he hoped to pitch for New York or Philadelphia in the coming year. He also said that he would be happy to pitch in Buffalo if the city received a major league expansion team. Chamberlain stayed in Cincinnati for that season and the next one, earning 16–12 and 10–9 records. On May 30, 1894, Chamberlain was the pitcher when Bobby Lowe became the first major league player to hit four home runs in one game. Two of Lowe's home runs came in the same inning. Lowe hit only 70 career home runs in an 18-year career.

== Later career and life ==
Chamberlain had agreed to play for the Cleveland Spiders in 1895, but instead he joined a Class D baseball team out of Warren, Ohio in the Iron and Oil League. Future Baseball Hall of Fame member Honus Wagner played on the team. Years later, Wagner recalled Chamberlain as an experienced pitcher who shared his baseball knowledge with his young teammates. He reported to the Spiders in 1896. The team featured Cy Young and young pitchers such as Cy Swaim and Zeke Wilson. Chamberlain was released after appearing in two games.

Chamberlain finished his major league career with a 157–120 win–loss record and a 3.57 earned run average. Though he only finished among the top ten in complete games in two of his seasons, Chamberlain completed 264 of his 301 games started. His complete game total was ranked 64th on the all-time major league list after the 2013 season. Chamberlain also hit nine home runs, including a grand slam, during his major league career.

In early 1898, The Montreal Gazette reported that NL president Nicholas Young signed Chamberlain as an umpire for the coming season. Chamberlain did not ultimately work for the NL because he was unhappy with the salary that he was offered. He played local semi-amateur baseball in Buffalo and then announced that he was leaving baseball to become a boxer. He challenged Jack Baty, a black fighter, to a boxing match and posted a $500 bet on the fight. There is no record of Chamberlain boxing against Baty or anyone else, and little is known about his life after the major leagues.

Chamberlain briefly played minor league baseball for the 1899 Buffalo Bisons in the Western League. He did not win any games for Buffalo. In 1904, Sporting Life reported that the pitcher had a brother, F. Earl Chamberlain, who was named a Pacific Coast League umpire. Elton died of colon cancer on September 22, 1929, at the age of 61. He was interred in the Holy Cross Cemetery in Baltimore, Maryland.

== See also ==
- List of Major League Baseball annual shutout leaders
- List of Major League Baseball career complete games leaders
- List of St. Louis Cardinals team records
