= 1888 St. Louis Browns season =

Major League Baseball season

1888 St. Louis Browns
- American Association Champions
- League: American Association
- Ballpark: Sportsman's Park
- City: St. Louis, Missouri
- Record: 92–43 (.681)
- League place: 1st
- Owner: Chris von der Ahe
- Manager: Charlie Comiskey
- Stats: ESPN.com; Baseball Reference

The 1888 St. Louis Browns season was the team's seventh season in St. Louis, Missouri, and its seventh season in the American Association. The Browns went 92–43 during the season and finished first in the American Association, claiming their fourth pennant in a row. In the 1888 World Series, the Browns faced the National League champion New York Giants, losing the series 6 games to 4.

== Regular season ==
=== Season standings ===
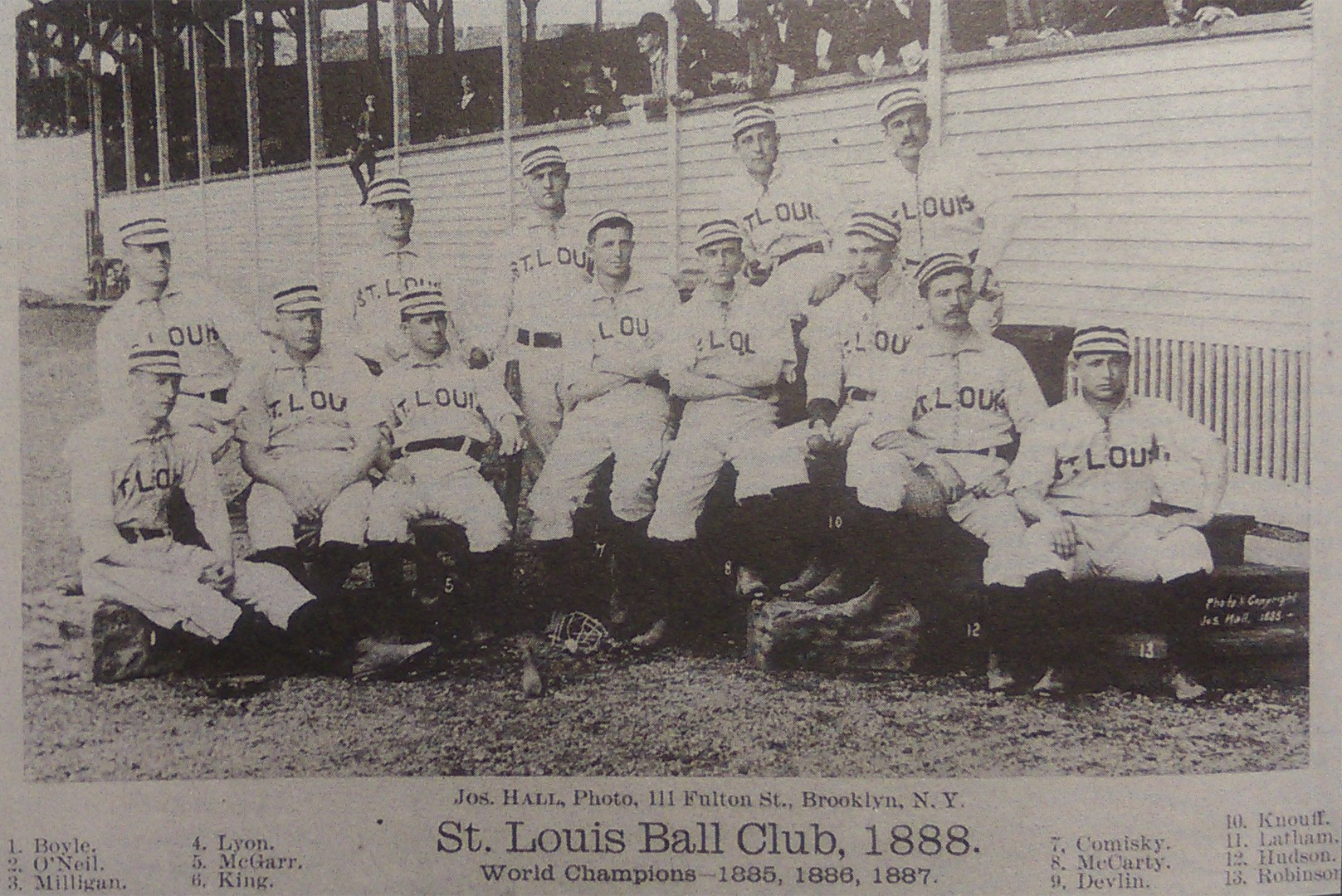
1888 St. Louis Browns

American Association
Team	W	L	Pct.	GB	Home	Road
St. Louis Browns	92	43	.681	—	60‍–‍21	32‍–‍22
Brooklyn Bridegrooms	88	52	.629	6½	53‍–‍20	35‍–‍32
Philadelphia Athletics	81	52	.609	10	55‍–‍20	26‍–‍32
Cincinnati Red Stockings	80	54	.597	11½	56‍–‍25	24‍–‍29
Baltimore Orioles	57	80	.416	36	30‍–‍26	27‍–‍54
Cleveland Blues	50	82	.379	40½	33‍–‍27	17‍–‍55
Louisville Colonels	48	87	.356	44	27‍–‍29	21‍–‍58
Kansas City Cowboys	43	89	.326	47½	23‍–‍34	20‍–‍55

=== Record vs. opponents ===
1888 American Association record Sources:
Team	BAL	BRO	CIN	CLE	KC	LOU	PHA	STL
Baltimore	—	8–12	6–14	10–9	11–8	11–9	5–14	6–14
Brooklyn	12–8	—	14–6–1	16–4	11–9	13–7	12–8–1	10–10–1
Cincinnati	14–6	6–14–1	—	10–7–1	15–4	17–3–1	10–10	8–10
Cleveland	9–10	4–16	7–10–1	—	10–9	9–8–2	7–13	4–16
Kansas City	8–11	9–11	4–15	9–10	—	6–12	3–14	4–16
Louisville	9–11	7–13	3–17–1	8–9–2	12–6	—	5–15–1	4–16
Philadelphia	14–5	8–12–1	10–10	13–7	14–3	15–5–1	—	7–10–1
St. Louis	14–6	10–10–1	10–8	16–4	16–4	16–4	10–7–1	—

=== Roster ===
1888 St. Louis Browns
Roster
Pitchers: Ice Box Chamberlain; Jim Devlin; Julie Freeman; Nat Hudson; Silver King; Ed Knouff	Catchers: Jack Boyle; Tom Dolan; Jocko Milligan; Infielders: Charlie Comiskey; Joseph Herr; Arlie Latham; Chippy McGarr; Yank Robinson; Bill White	Outfielders: Harry Lyons; Tommy McCarthy; Tip O'Neill	Manager: Charlie Comiskey

== Player stats ==
=== Batting ===
==== Starters by position ====
Note: Pos = Position; G = Games played; AB = At bats; H = Hits; Avg. = Batting average; HR = Home runs; RBI = Runs batted in

Pos	Player	G	AB	H	Avg.	HR	RBI
C	Jack Boyle	71	257	62	.241	1	23
1B	Charlie Comiskey	137	576	157	.273	6	83
2B	Yank Robinson	134	455	105	.231	3	53
SS	Bill White	76	275	48	.175	2	30
3B	Arlie Latham	133	570	151	.265	2	31
OF	Tip O'Neill	130	529	177	.335	5	98
OF	Harry Lyons	123	499	97	.194	4	63
OF	Tommy McCarthy	131	511	140	.274	1	68

==== Other batters ====
Note: G = Games played; AB = At bats; H = Hits; Avg. = Batting average; HR = Home runs; RBI = Runs batted in

Player	G	AB	H	Avg.	HR	RBI
Jocko Milligan	63	219	55	.251	5	37
Joseph Herr	43	172	46	.267	3	43
Chippy McGarr	34	132	31	.235	0	13
Tom Dolan	11	36	7	.194	0	1

=== Pitching ===
==== Starting pitchers ====
Note: G = Games pitched; IP = Innings pitched; W = Wins; L = Losses; ERA = Earned run average; SO = Strikeouts

Player	G	IP	W	L	ERA	SO
Silver King	66	584.2	45	20	1.63	258
Nat Hudson	39	333.0	25	10	2.54	130
Ice Box Chamberlain	14	112.0	11	2	1.61	57
Jim Devlin	11	90.1	6	5	3.19	45
Ed Knouff	9	81.0	5	4	2.67	25
Julie Freeman	1	6.1	0	1	4.26	1

==== Other pitchers ====
Note: G = Games pitched; IP = Innings pitched; W = Wins; L = Losses; ERA = Earned run average; SO = Strikeouts

Player	G	IP	W	L	ERA	SO
Tommy McCarthy	2	5.1	0	1	5.06	1
