= George Walker (1880s pitcher) =

Canadian baseball player (1856–1908)

- Pitcher
- Born: 1856; Hamilton, Canada West
- Died: May 26, 1908 (aged 51–52); Hamilton, Ontario, Canada
- Batted: Unknown Threw: Unknown

MLB debut
- August 1, 1888, for the Baltimore Orioles

Last MLB appearance
- September 20, 1888, for the Baltimore Orioles

MLB statistics
- Win–loss record: 1–3
- Earned run average: 5.91
- Strikeouts: 18
- Stats at Baseball Reference

Teams
- Baltimore Orioles (1888)

George A. Walker (1856 – May 26, 1908) was a Canadian Major League Baseball pitcher who played in 1888 with the Baltimore Orioles.

In 4 games, Walker had a 1–3 record with a 5.91 ERA.
