= Ed Silch =

American baseball player (1865–1895)

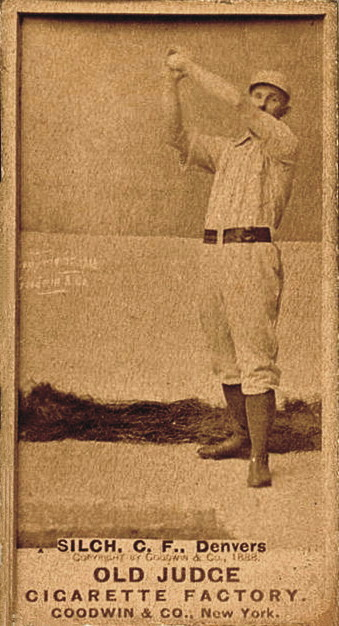
- Outfielder
- Born: February 22, 1865; St. Louis, Missouri, US
- Died: January 15, 1895 (aged 29); St. Louis, Missouri, US
- Batted: Unknown Threw: Right

MLB debut
- April 29, 1888, for the Brooklyn Bridegrooms

Last MLB appearance
- July 8, 1888, for the Brooklyn Bridegrooms

MLB statistics
- Batting average: .271
- Games played: 14
- Runs batted in: 3
- Stats at Baseball Reference

Teams
- Brooklyn Bridegrooms (1888)

Edward Silch (February 22, 1865 – January 15, 1895), also known as "Baldy", was an American Major League Baseball player from St. Louis, Missouri, USA. He played just one season in the majors, consisting of 14 games with the 1888 Brooklyn Bridegrooms. He played entirely in the outfield, and batted .273.

Silch died of consumption at the age of 29 in his hometown of St. Louis, and is interred at Calvary Cemetery, also in St. Louis.
