= Pat Whitaker =

American baseball player (1865–1902)

- Pitcher
- Born: December 6, 1865; St. Louis, Missouri, U.S.
- Died: July 15, 1902 (aged 36); St. Louis, Missouri, U.S.
- Batted: Unknown Threw: Right

MLB debut
- October 11, 1888, for the Baltimore Orioles

Last MLB appearance
- July 25, 1889, for the Baltimore Orioles

MLB statistics
- Record: 2-1
- Strikeouts: 6
- ERA: 3.91
- Stats at Baseball Reference

Teams
- Baltimore Orioles (1888–1889)

William H. "Pat" Whitaker (December 6, 1865 in St. Louis, Missouri – July 15, 1902 in St. Louis, Missouri) was an American Major League Baseball pitcher who played for the Baltimore Orioles from 1888 to 1889.

Whitaker made his Major League debut on October 11, 1888 at the age of 22. In the minors in 1888, he had a 7–3 win-loss record to go with a 0.83 earned run average in 11 games started. Though he allowed 36 runs, only eight were earned. He appeared in two games for the Orioles that season, going 1–1 with a 5.14 ERA and striking out five batters in 14 innings. The following year, he appeared in one game, allowing two earned runs and earning the win. He completed all three games in which he appeared in his career, posting a 2–1 record with a 3.91 ERA. He walked 10 batters and struck out six.

He appeared in his final big league game on July 25, 1889. Following his death in 1902, he was interred at St. Matthew Cemetery in St. Louis.
