= 1888 Cincinnati Red Stockings season =

1888 Cincinnati Red Stockings
- League: American Association
- Ballpark: American Park
- City: Cincinnati
- Record: 80–54 (.597)
- League place: 4th
- Owner: Aaron S. Stern
- Manager: Gus Schmelz

The 1888 Cincinnati Red Stockings season was a season in American baseball. The team finished in fourth place in the American Association with a record of 80–54, 11.5 games behind the St. Louis Browns.

== Regular season ==
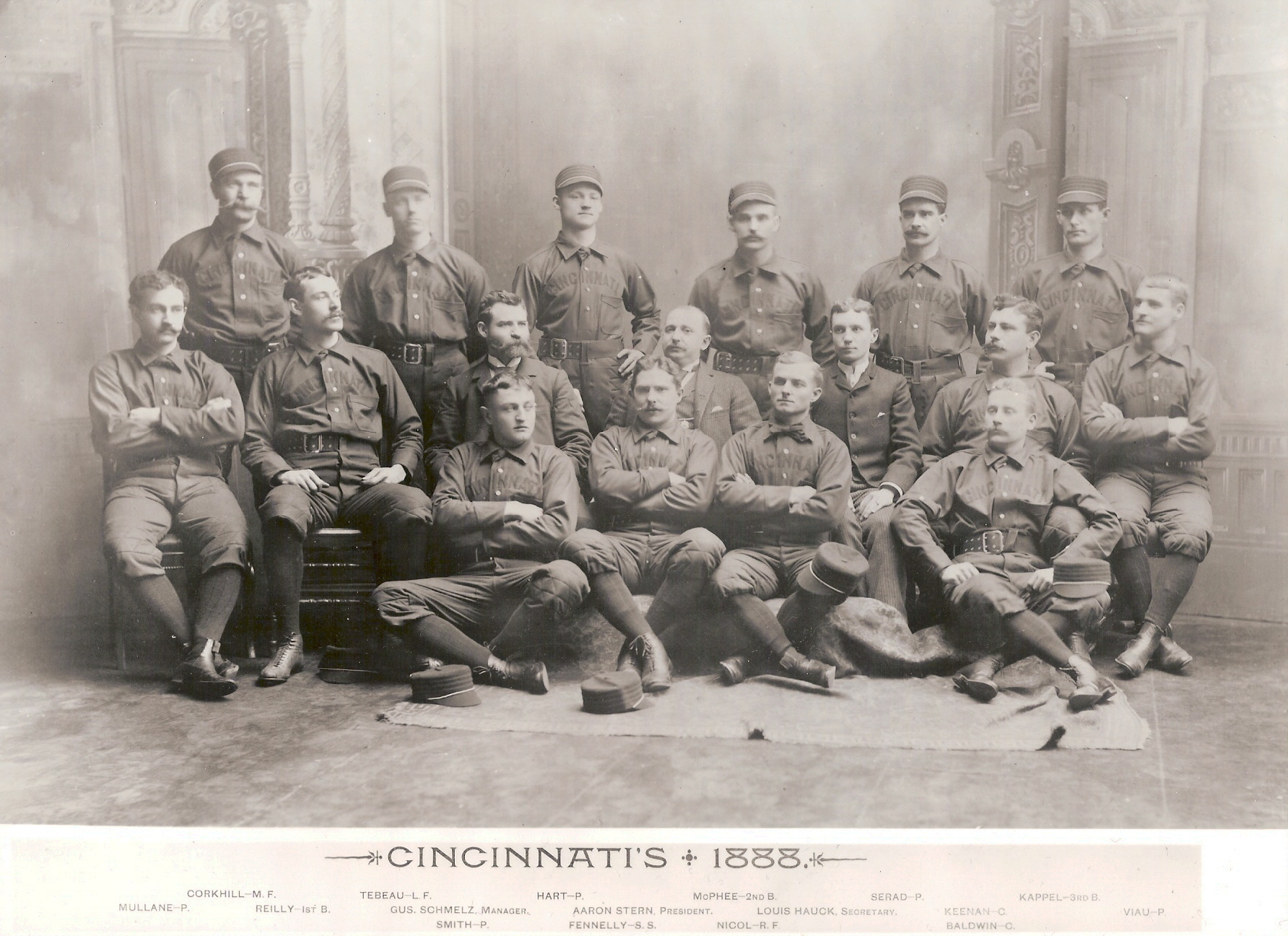
The 1888 Cincinnati Red Stockings

Cincinnati retained manager Gus Schmelz, who led the team to a franchise record 81 wins in 1887. The Red Stockings were quiet during the off-season, as pitcher Lee Viau, who signed his first professional contract, was the only major signing by the team.

John Reilly had the best season of his career, hitting .321 while leading the league with 13 home runs and 103 RBI, as he became the first Red Stocking to crack 100 RBI in a season. He also had 83 stolen bases. Hugh Nicol hit only .239; however, he once again stole over 100 bases, finishing the season with 103. Nicol and Reilly tied for the team high with 112 runs scored.

On the mound, Lee Viau led Cincinnati with 27 wins and a 2.65 ERA in 42 starts. Tony Mullane and Mike Smith each finished with over 20 wins as well, with 26 and 22 respectively.

The Red Stockings began the season red hot, as they had a 12–5 record before winning 10 games in a row to be 22–5, three games ahead of the second place St. Louis Browns. Cincinnati then fell into a slump, going 5–16 in their next 21 games to fall into fourth place, seven games out of first. The Red Stockings remained in the pennant race until late in the season. However, the team finished the year in fourth place with an 80–54 record, 11.5 games behind the first place Browns.

=== Season standings ===
American Association
| Team | W | L | Pct. | GB | Home | Road |
|---|---|---|---|---|---|---|
| St. Louis Browns | 92 | 43 | .681 | — | 60‍–‍21 | 32‍–‍22 |
| Brooklyn Bridegrooms | 88 | 52 | .629 | 6½ | 53‍–‍20 | 35‍–‍32 |
| Philadelphia Athletics | 81 | 52 | .609 | 10 | 55‍–‍20 | 26‍–‍32 |
| Cincinnati Red Stockings | 80 | 54 | .597 | 11½ | 56‍–‍25 | 24‍–‍29 |
| Baltimore Orioles | 57 | 80 | .416 | 36 | 30‍–‍26 | 27‍–‍54 |
| Cleveland Blues | 50 | 82 | .379 | 40½ | 33‍–‍27 | 17‍–‍55 |
| Louisville Colonels | 48 | 87 | .356 | 44 | 27‍–‍29 | 21‍–‍58 |
| Kansas City Cowboys | 43 | 89 | .326 | 47½ | 23‍–‍34 | 20‍–‍55 |

=== Record vs. opponents ===
1888 American Association record Sources:
| Team | BAL | BRO | CIN | CLE | KC | LOU | PHA | STL |
|---|---|---|---|---|---|---|---|---|
| Baltimore | — | 8–12 | 6–14 | 10–9 | 11–8 | 11–9 | 5–14 | 6–14 |
| Brooklyn | 12–8 | — | 14–6–1 | 16–4 | 11–9 | 13–7 | 12–8–1 | 10–10–1 |
| Cincinnati | 14–6 | 6–14–1 | — | 10–7–1 | 15–4 | 17–3–1 | 10–10 | 8–10 |
| Cleveland | 9–10 | 4–16 | 7–10–1 | — | 10–9 | 9–8–2 | 7–13 | 4–16 |
| Kansas City | 8–11 | 9–11 | 4–15 | 9–10 | — | 6–12 | 3–14 | 4–16 |
| Louisville | 9–11 | 7–13 | 3–17–1 | 8–9–2 | 12–6 | — | 5–15–1 | 4–16 |
| Philadelphia | 14–5 | 8–12–1 | 10–10 | 13–7 | 14–3 | 15–5–1 | — | 7–10–1 |
| St. Louis | 14–6 | 10–10–1 | 10–8 | 16–4 | 16–4 | 16–4 | 10–7–1 | — |

=== Game log ===
Legend
| Red Stockings Win | Red Stockings Loss | Game Tied/Postponed |

1888 Game Log: 80–54 (Home: 56–25; Away: 24–29)
April: 8–3 (Home: 0–0; Away: 8–3)

| # | Date | Opponent | Score | Stadium | Attendance | Record | Streak |
|---|---|---|---|---|---|---|---|
| 1 | April 18 | @ Cowboys | 10–3 | Exposition Park | 1,000 | 1-0 | W1 |
| 2 | April 19 | @ Cowboys | 4–10 | Exposition Park | N/A | 1-1 | L1 |
| 3 | April 21 | @ Cowboys | 6–4 | Exposition Park | N/A | 2-1 | W1 |
| 4 | April 22 | @ Cowboys | 10–8 | Exposition Park | N/A | 3-1 | W2 |
| 5 | April 23 | @ Browns | 2–3 | Sportsman's Park | N/A | 3-2 | L1 |
| 6 | April 24 | @ Browns | 4–3 | Sportsman's Park | N/A | 4-2 | W1 |
| 7 | April 25 | @ Browns | 5–1 | Sportsman's Park | N/A | 5-2 | W2 |
| 8 | April 26 | @ Browns | 4–3 | Sportsman's Park | N/A | 6-2 | W3 |
| 9 | April 28 | @ Colonels | 4–6 | Eclipse Park | N/A | 6-3 | L1 |
| 10 | April 29 | @ Colonels | 8–3 | Eclipse Park | N/A | 7-3 | W1 |
| 11 | April 30 | @ Colonels | 6–5 | Eclipse Park | N/A | 8-3 | W2 |

May: 15–6 (Home: 11–2; Away: 4–4)

| # | Date | Opponent | Score | Stadium | Attendance | Record | Streak |
|---|---|---|---|---|---|---|---|
| - | May 1 | @ Colonels | Postponed (site change); Makeup: May 1 | | | | |
| 12 | May 1 | Colonels | 18–2 | American Park | N/A | 9-3 | W3 |
| - | May 2 | @ Colonels | Postponed (site change); Makeup: June 22 | | | | |
| 13 | May 3 | Cowboys | 14–0 | American Park | N/A | 10-3 | W4 |
| 14 | May 4 | Cowboys | 3–4 | American Park | N/A | 10-4 | L1 |
| 15 | May 5 | Cowboys | 16–6 | American Park | N/A | 11-4 | W1 |
| 16 | May 6 | Cowboys | 14–7 | American Park | N/A | 12-4 | W2 |
| - | May 8 | Browns | Postponed (rain); Makeup: October 14 | | | | |
| 17 | May 9 | Browns | 7–8 | American Park | N/A | 12-5 | L1 |
| 18 | May 10 | Browns | 7–1 | American Park | N/A | 13-5 | W1 |
| 19 | May 11 | Browns | 2–0 | American Park | N/A | 14-5 | W2 |
| 20 | May 12 | Colonels | 8–3 | American Park | N/A | 15-5 | W3 |
| 21 | May 13 | Colonels | 6–2 | American Park | 7,000 | 16-5 | W4 |
| 22 | May 15 | Colonels | 8–4 | American Park | N/A | 17-5 | W5 |
| 23 | May 16 | Colonels | 5–3 | American Park | N/A | 18-5 | W6 |
| 24 | May 19 | @ Blues | 5–0 | National League Park | N/A | 19-5 | W7 |
| 25 | May 20 | Blues | 8–4 | American Park | N/A | 20-5 | W8 |
| - | May 21 | @ Blues | Postponed (rain, site change); Makeup: May 20 | | | | |
| 26 | May 22 | @ Blues | 6–4 | National League Park | N/A | 21-5 | W9 |
| 27 | May 23 | @ Blues | 6–5 | National League Park | N/A | 22-5 | W10 |
| - | May 25 | @ Orioles | Postponed (rain, site change); Makeup: August 26 | | | | |
| 28 | May 26 | @ Orioles | 1–6 | Oriole Park | N/A | 22-6 | L1 |
| 29 | May 28 | @ Orioles | 3–5 | Oriole Park | N/A | 22-7 | L2 |
| 30 | May 29 | @ Orioles | 10–5 | Oriole Park | N/A | 23-7 | W1 |
| 31 | May 30 1 | @ Bridegrooms | 3–4 | Washington Park | N/A | 23-8 | L1 |
| 32 | May 30 2 | @ Bridegrooms | 6–10 | Washington Park | N/A | 23-9 | L2 |

June: 9–13 (Home: 5–4; Away: 4–9)

| # | Date | Opponent | Score | Stadium | Attendance | Record | Streak |
|---|---|---|---|---|---|---|---|
| 33 | June 1 | @ Bridegrooms | 1–3 | Washington Park | N/A | 23-10 | L3 |
| 34 | June 2 | @ Bridegrooms | 6–15 | Washington Park | N/A | 23-11 | L4 |
| 35 | June 4 | @ Athletics | 6–16 | Jefferson Street Grounds | N/A | 23-12 | L5 |
| 36 | June 5 | @ Athletics | 7–14 | Jefferson Street Grounds | N/A | 23-13 | L6 |
| 37 | June 6 | @ Athletics | 4–7 | Jefferson Street Grounds | N/A | 23-14 | L7 |
| 38 | June 7 | @ Athletics | 3–5 | Jefferson Street Grounds | N/A | 23-15 | L8 |
| 39 | June 9 | Browns | 6–5 | American Park | N/A | 24-15 | W1 |
| 40 | June 10 | Browns | 8–17 | American Park | N/A | 24-16 | L1 |
| 41 | June 11 | Browns | 1–8 | American Park | N/A | 24-17 | L2 |
| 42 | June 13 | @ Cowboys | 11–6 | Exposition Park | N/A | 25-17 | W1 |
| 43 | June 14 | @ Cowboys | 16–3 | Exposition Park | N/A | 26-17 | W2 |
| 44 | June 15 | @ Cowboys | 13–17 | Exposition Park | N/A | 26-18 | L1 |
| 45 | June 16 | @ Browns | 1–9 | Sportsman's Park | N/A | 26-19 | L2 |
| 46 | June 17 | @ Browns | 2–6 | Sportsman's Park | N/A | 26-20 | L3 |
| 47 | June 19 | @ Browns | 2–1 | Sportsman's Park | N/A | 27-20 | W1 |
| - | June 21 | @ Colonels | Postponed (site change); Makeup: June 21 | | | | |
| 48 | June 21 | Colonels | 9–15 | American Park | N/A | 27-21 | L1 |
| 49 | June 22 | Colonels | 10–8 | American Park | N/A | 28-21 | W1 |
| 50 | June 23 | @ Colonels | 10–10 | Eclipse Park | N/A | 28-21 | W1 |
| 51 | June 24 | @ Colonels | 11–4 | Eclipse Park | N/A | 29-21 | W2 |
| 52 | June 26 | Orioles | 5–4 | American Park | N/A | 30-21 | W3 |
| - | June 27 | Orioles | Postponed (rain); Makeup: June 29 | | | | |
| 53 | June 28 | Orioles | 11–5 | American Park | N/A | 31-21 | W4 |
| 54 | June 29 | Orioles | 1–7 | American Park | N/A | 31-22 | L1 |
| 55 | June 30 | Orioles | 4–1 | American Park | N/A | 32-22 | W1 |

July: 16–7 (Home: 13–5; Away: 3–2)

| # | Date | Opponent | Score | Stadium | Attendance | Record | Streak |
|---|---|---|---|---|---|---|---|
| 56 | July 1 | Bridegrooms | 3–2 | American Park | N/A | 33-22 | W2 |
| 57 | July 3 | Bridegrooms | 3–6 | American Park | N/A | 33-23 | L1 |
| 58 | July 4 | Bridegrooms | 3–9 | American Park | 3,400 | 33-24 | L2 |
| - | July 4 2 | Bridegrooms | Postponed (rain); Makeup: July 5 | | | | |
| 59 | July 5 | Bridegrooms | 14–7 | American Park | N/A | 34-24 | W1 |
| 60 | July 6 | Athletics | 9–8 | American Park | N/A | 35-24 | W2 |
| 61 | July 7 | Athletics | 0–7 | American Park | N/A | 35-25 | L1 |
| 62 | July 8 | Athletics | 4–1 | American Park | N/A | 36-25 | W1 |
| 63 | July 10 | Athletics | 5–4 | American Park | N/A | 37-25 | W2 |
| 64 | July 12 | Blues | 1–2 | American Park | N/A | 37-26 | L1 |
| 65 | July 13 | Blues | 4–3 | American Park | N/A | 38-26 | W1 |
| 66 | July 14 | Blues | 10–0 | American Park | N/A | 39-26 | W2 |
| 67 | July 15 | Blues | 12–7 | American Park | N/A | 40-26 | W3 |
| 68 | July 17 | Colonels | 1–0 | American Park | N/A | 41-26 | W4 |
| 69 | July 18 | Colonels | 4–1 | American Park | N/A | 42-26 | W5 |
| 70 | July 19 | Colonels | 0–6 | American Park | N/A | 42-27 | L1 |
| 71 | July 21 | Cowboys | 8–1 | American Park | N/A | 43-27 | W1 |
| 72 | July 22 | Cowboys | 10–1 | American Park | N/A | 44-27 | W2 |
| 73 | July 24 | Cowboys | 6–4 | American Park | N/A | 45-27 | W3 |
| 74 | July 26 | @ Athletics | 2–12 | Jefferson Street Grounds | N/A | 45-28 | L1 |
| 75 | July 27 | @ Athletics | 7–4 | Jefferson Street Grounds | N/A | 46-28 | W1 |
| 76 | July 28 | @ Athletics | 2–1 | Jefferson Street Grounds | N/A | 47-28 | W2 |
| 77 | July 29 | @ Bridegrooms | 2–6 | Washington Park | N/A | 47-29 | L1 |
| 78 | July 31 | @ Bridegrooms | 3–0 | Washington Park | N/A | 48-29 | W1 |

August: 12–9 (Home: 10–7; Away: 2–2)

| # | Date | Opponent | Score | Stadium | Attendance | Record | Streak |
|---|---|---|---|---|---|---|---|
| 79 | August 1 | @ Bridegrooms | 2–8 | Washington Park | 2,000 | 48-30 | L1 |
| - | August 2 | @ Blues | Postponed (horse race, site change); Makeup: August 5 | | | | |
| - | August 3 | @ Blues | Postponed (site change); Makeup: August 3 | | | | |
| 80 | August 3 | Blues | 8–9 | American Park | N/A | 48-31 | L2 |
| - | August 4 | @ Blues | Postponed (site change); Makeup: August 4 | | | | |
| 81 | August 4 | Blues | 4–4 | American Park | 500 | 48-31 | L2 |
| 82 | August 5 | Blues | 6–5 | American Park | N/A | 49-31 | W1 |
| - | August 6 | @ Orioles | Postponed (site change); Makeup: August 9 | | | | |
| - | August 7 | @ Orioles | Postponed (site change); Makeup: August 7 | | | | |
| 83 | August 7 | Orioles | 4–3 | American Park | N/A | 50-31 | W2 |
| - | August 8 | @ Orioles | Postponed (site change); Makeup: August 8 | | | | |
| 84 | August 8 | Orioles | 6–2 | American Park | N/A | 51-31 | W3 |
| 85 | August 9 | Orioles | 3–6 | American Park | N/A | 51-32 | L1 |
| 86 | August 10 | Bridegrooms | 5–2 | American Park | N/A | 52-32 | W1 |
| 87 | August 11 | Bridegrooms | 5–6 | American Park | N/A | 52-33 | L1 |
| 88 | August 12 | Bridegrooms | 0–1 | American Park | N/A | 52-34 | L2 |
| 89 | August 13 | Orioles | 3–2 | American Park | N/A | 53-34 | W1 |
| 90 | August 14 | Orioles | 11–6 | American Park | N/A | 54-34 | W2 |
| 91 | August 15 | Orioles | 7–3 | American Park | N/A | 55-34 | W3 |
| - | August 17 | Athletics | Postponed (rain); Makeup: September 20 | | | | |
| 92 | August 18 | Athletics | 4–0 | American Park | N/A | 56-34 | W4 |
| 93 | August 19 | Athletics | 4–8 | American Park | N/A | 56-35 | L1 |
| - | August 20 | Blues | Postponed (rain); Makeup: August 23 | | | | |
| 94 | August 22 | Blues | 0–3 | American Park | N/A | 56-36 | L2 |
| 95 | August 23 | Blues | 0–1 | American Park | N/A | 56-37 | L3 |
| - | August 25 | @ Orioles | Postponed (site change); Makeup: August 25 | | | | |
| 96 | August 25 | Orioles | 10–4 | American Park | N/A | 57-37 | W1 |
| 97 | August 26 | Orioles | 6–0 | American Park | N/A | 58-37 | W2 |
| 98 | August 27 | @ Orioles | 3–4 | Oriole Park | N/A | 58-38 | L1 |
| 99 | August 28 | @ Orioles | 3–1 | Oriole Park | N/A | 59-38 | W1 |
| 100 | August 30 | @ Bridegrooms | 5–3 | Washington Park | N/A | 60-38 | W2 |

September: 11–14 (Home: 11–5; Away: 0–9)

| # | Date | Opponent | Score | Stadium | Attendance | Record | Streak |
|---|---|---|---|---|---|---|---|
| 101 | September 1 | @ Bridegrooms | 2–2 | Washington Park | N/A | 60-38 | W2 |
| 102 | September 2 | @ Bridegrooms | 4–5 | Washington Park | N/A | 60-39 | L1 |
| 103 | September 3 | @ Athletics | 2–5 | Jefferson Street Grounds | N/A | 60-40 | L2 |
| 104 | September 4 | @ Athletics | 2–3 | Jefferson Street Grounds | N/A | 60-41 | L3 |
| 105 | September 5 | @ Athletics | 0–3 | Jefferson Street Grounds | N/A | 60-42 | L4 |
| 106 | September 6 | @ Blues | 2–3 | National League Park | N/A | 60-43 | L5 |
| 107 | September 8 | @ Blues | 1–2 | National League Park | N/A | 60-44 | L6 |
| 108 | September 10 | Cowboys | 2–3 | American Park | N/A | 60-45 | L7 |
| - | September 11 | @ Cowboys | Postponed (site change); Makeup: September 11 | | | | |
| 109 | September 11 | Cowboys | 11–0 | American Park | N/A | 61-45 | W1 |
| - | September 12 | @ Cowboys | Postponed (site change); Makeup: September 12 | | | | |
| 110 | September 12 | Cowboys | 5–2 | American Park | N/A | 62-45 | W2 |
| - | September 13 | @ Cowboys | Postponed (site change); Makeup: September 10 | | | | |
| 111 | September 14 | @ Browns | 2–14 | Sportsman's Park | N/A | 62-46 | L1 |
| 112 | September 15 | @ Browns | 3–5 | Sportsman's Park | N/A | 62-47 | L2 |
| 113 | September 16 | @ Browns | 2–4 | Sportsman's Park | N/A | 62-48 | L3 |
| 114 | September 18 | Athletics | 5–1 | American Park | N/A | 63-48 | W1 |
| 115 | September 19 | Athletics | 11–2 | American Park | N/A | 64-48 | W2 |
| 116 | September 20 1 | Athletics | 1–0 | American Park | N/A | 65-48 | W3 |
| 117 | September 20 2 | Athletics | 2–1 | American Park | N/A | 66-48 | W4 |
| 118 | September 21 | Bridegrooms | 2–6 | American Park | N/A | 66-49 | L1 |
| 119 | September 22 | Bridegrooms | 10–3 | American Park | N/A | 67-49 | W1 |
| 120 | September 23 | Bridegrooms | 4–8 | American Park | N/A | 67-50 | L1 |
| 121 | September 25 | Blues | 1–2 | American Park | N/A | 67-51 | L2 |
| 122 | September 26 | Blues | 5–1 | American Park | N/A | 68-51 | W1 |
| 123 | September 27 | Blues | 6–5 | American Park | N/A | 69-51 | W2 |
| 124 | September 28 | Orioles | 0–12 | American Park | N/A | 69-52 | L1 |
| 125 | September 29 | Orioles | 8–1 | American Park | N/A | 70-52 | W1 |
| 126 | September 30 | Orioles | 5–2 | American Park | N/A | 71-52 | W2 |

October: 9–2 (Home: 6–2; Away: 3–0)

| # | Date | Opponent | Score | Stadium | Attendance | Record | Streak |
|---|---|---|---|---|---|---|---|
| 127 | October 1 | Bridegrooms | 5–8 | American Park | N/A | 71-53 | L1 |
| 128 | October 2 | @ Colonels | 3–1 | Eclipse Park | N/A | 72-53 | W1 |
| 129 | October 3 | @ Colonels | 5–2 | Eclipse Park | N/A | 73-53 | W2 |
| 130 | October 4 | @ Colonels | 7–3 | Eclipse Park | N/A | 74-53 | W3 |
| 131 | October 5 | Colonels | 5–3 | American Park | N/A | 75-53 | W4 |
| 132 | October 6 | Colonels | 3–1 | American Park | N/A | 76-53 | W5 |
| 133 | October 7 | Colonels | 11–8 | American Park | N/A | 77-53 | W6 |
| 134 | October 9 | Cowboys | 13–6 | American Park | N/A | 78-53 | W7 |
| 135 | October 10 | Cowboys | 4–3 | American Park | N/A | 79-53 | W8 |
| 136 | October 14 1 | Browns | 1–6 | American Park | 7,000 | 79-54 | L1 |
| 137 | October 14 2 | Browns | 10–1 | American Park | N/A | 80-54 | W1 |

=== Roster ===
1888 Cincinnati Red Stockings
Roster
| Pitchers: Tony Mullane; Billy Serad; Mike Smith; Lee Viau; John Weyhing | Catchers: Kid Baldwin; Ned Bligh; Jim Keenan; Infielders: Hick Carpenter; Frank Fennelly; Heinie Kappel; Bid McPhee; John Reilly | Outfielders: Pop Corkhill; Hugh Nicol; Jack O'Connor; George Tebeau | Manager: Gus Schmelz |

== Player stats ==
=== Batting ===
==== Starters by position ====
Note: Pos = Position; G = Games played; AB = At bats; H = Hits; Avg. = Batting average; HR = Home runs; RBI = Runs batted in

| Pos | Player | G | AB | H | Avg. | HR | RBI |
|---|---|---|---|---|---|---|---|
| C | Jim Keenan | 85 | 313 | 73 | .233 | 1 | 40 |
| 1B | John Reilly | 127 | 527 | 169 | .321 | 13 | 103 |
| 2B | Bid McPhee | 111 | 458 | 110 | .240 | 4 | 51 |
| SS | Frank Fennelly | 120 | 448 | 88 | .196 | 2 | 56 |
| 3B | Hick Carpenter | 136 | 551 | 147 | .267 | 3 | 67 |
| OF | Hugh Nicol | 135 | 548 | 131 | .239 | 1 | 35 |
| OF | Pop Corkhill | 118 | 490 | 133 | .271 | 1 | 74 |
| OF | George Tebeau | 121 | 411 | 94 | .229 | 3 | 51 |

==== Other batters ====
Note: G = Games played; AB = At bats; H = Hits; Avg. = Batting average; HR = Home runs; RBI = Runs batted in

| Player | G | AB | H | Avg. | HR | RBI |
|---|---|---|---|---|---|---|
| Kid Baldwin | 67 | 271 | 59 | .218 | 1 | 25 |
| Heinie Kappel | 36 | 143 | 37 | .259 | 1 | 15 |
| Jack O'Connor | 36 | 137 | 28 | .204 | 1 | 17 |
| Ned Bligh | 3 | 5 | 0 | .000 | 0 | 0 |

=== Pitching ===
==== Starting pitchers ====
Note: G = Games pitched; IP = Innings pitched; W = Wins; L = Losses; ERA = Earned run average; SO = Strikeouts

| Player | G | IP | W | L | ERA | SO |
|---|---|---|---|---|---|---|
| Lee Viau | 42 | 387.2 | 27 | 14 | 2.65 | 164 |
| Tony Mullane | 44 | 380.1 | 26 | 16 | 2.84 | 186 |
| Mike Smith | 40 | 348.1 | 22 | 17 | 2.74 | 154 |
| John Weyhing | 8 | 65.2 | 3 | 4 | 1.23 | 30 |
| Billy Serad | 6 | 50.2 | 2 | 3 | 3.55 | 4 |

==== Relief pitchers ====
Note: G = Games pitched; W = Wins; L = Losses; SV = Saves; ERA = Earned run average; SO = Strikeouts

| Player | G | W | L | SV | ERA | SO |
|---|---|---|---|---|---|---|
| Pop Corkhill | 2 | 0 | 0 | 1 | 10.80 | 1 |
