= Billy Crowell =

American baseball player (1865–1935)

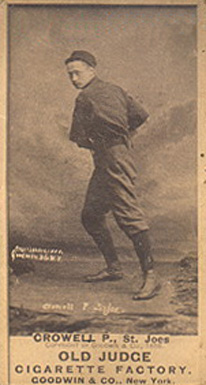
- Pitcher
- Born: November 6, 1865; Cincinnati, Ohio, U.S.
- Died: July 24, 1935 (aged 69); Fort Worth, Texas, U.S.
- Batted: Right Threw: Right

MLB debut
- April 20, 1887, for the Cleveland Blues

Last MLB appearance
- September 5, 1888, for the Louisville Colonels

MLB statistics
- Win–loss record: 19-45
- Strikeouts: 138
- Earned run average: 5.15
- Stats at Baseball Reference

Teams
- Cleveland Blues (1887–1888); Louisville Colonels (1888)

William Theodore Crowell (November 6, 1865 in Cincinnati – July 24, 1935 in Fort Worth, Texas) was an American Major League Baseball pitcher in 1887–1888. He played for the Cleveland Blues and Louisville Colonels. Before coming to the majors he won 28 games for Altoona in 1886 and played for the Monmouth Maple Cities (Illinois–Iowa League) in 1890.
