= Bill Fagan =

American baseball player (1869–1930)

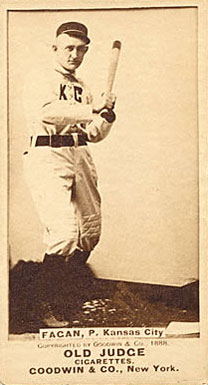
- Pitcher
- Born: February 15, 1869; Troy, New York, U.S.
- Died: March 21, 1930 (aged 61); Troy, New York, U.S.
- Batted: Unknown Threw: Left

MLB debut
- September 15, 1887, for the New York Metropolitans

Last MLB appearance
- July 20, 1888, for the Kansas City Cowboys

MLB statistics
- Win–loss record: 6–15
- Earned run average: 5.28
- Strikeouts: 61
- Stats at Baseball Reference

Teams
- New York Metropolitans (1887); Kansas City Cowboys (1888)

William A. Fagan (February 15, 1869 – March 21, 1930), nicknamed "Clinkers", was an American professional baseball player who played for the New York Metropolitans and the Kansas City Cowboys from 1887 to 1888.
