= Julie Freeman (baseball) =

American baseball player (1868–1921)

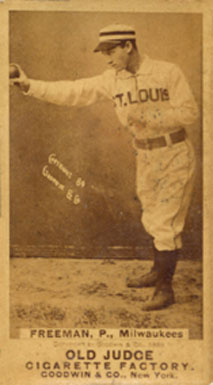
- Pitcher
- Born: November 7, 1869; Missouri
- Died: June 10, 1921 (aged 52); St. Louis, Missouri, U.S.
- Batted: Right Threw: Unknown

MLB debut
- October 10, 1888, for the St. Louis Browns

Last MLB appearance
- October 10, 1888, for the St. Louis Browns

MLB statistics
- Win–loss record: 0–1
- Strikeouts: 1
- Earned run average: 4.26
- Stats at Baseball Reference

Teams
- St. Louis Browns (1888)

Julius Benjamin Freeman (November 7, 1868 – June 10, 1921) was an American Major League Baseball pitcher for the 1888 St. Louis Browns of the American Association. At 19 years old, he lost his only start in the majors after having his finger broken by a line drive in the seventh inning of a game against the Louisville Colonels.
