= Frank Hafner =

American baseball player (1867–1957)

- Pitcher
- Born: August 14, 1867; Hannibal, Missouri, U.S.
- Died: March 2, 1957 (aged 89); Hannibal, Missouri, U.S.
- Batted: Unknown Threw: Right

MLB debut
- May 5, 1888, for the Kansas City Cowboys

Last MLB appearance
- May 10, 1888, for the Kansas City Cowboys

MLB statistics
- Win–loss record: 0–2
- Earned run average: 7.00
- Strikeouts: 5
- Stats at Baseball Reference

Teams
- Kansas City Cowboys (1888)

Francis R. Hafner (August 14, 1867 – March 2, 1957) was an American Major League Baseball player. A right-handed pitcher, Hafner started two games for the Kansas City Cowboys of the American Association in May 1888. He pitched a complete game both times, but allowed 23 runs (14 earned) to score, while surrendering two home runs, throwing six wild pitches, and allowing 41 men to reach base safely.

The total of six wild pitches ranked second in the league, and with one hit batsman Hafner tied for fourth in that category as well. He never pitched in the major leagues again.

== Sources ==
- Career statistics from Baseball Reference · Baseball Reference (Minors) · Retrosheet · Baseball Almanac
