= Hub Collins =

American baseball player (1864–1892)

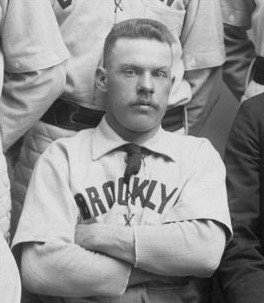
- Collins in 1889
- Second baseman
- Born: April 15, 1864; Louisville, Kentucky, U.S.
- Died: May 21, 1892 (aged 28); Brooklyn, New York, U.S.
- Batted: Right Threw: Right

MLB debut
- September 4, 1886, for the Louisville Colonels

Last MLB appearance
- May 14, 1892, for the Brooklyn Grooms

MLB statistics
- Batting average: .284
- Home runs: 11
- Runs batted in: 319
- Stats at Baseball Reference

Teams
- Louisville Colonels (1886–1888); Brooklyn Bridegrooms/Grooms (1888–1892)

Career highlights and awards
- American Association pennant: 1889; National League pennant: 1890; Four seasons with 100+ runs scored

Hubbert B. "Hub" Collins (April 15, 1864 – May 21, 1892) was an American professional baseball player. He was a second baseman and left fielder in Major League Baseball from 1886 to 1892 with the Louisville Colonels and Brooklyn Bridegrooms/Grooms.

== Biography ==
Collins was born in Louisville, Kentucky. He started his professional baseball career in the minor leagues in 1885, and he started his major league career with the Louisville Colonels of the American Association in 1886. Near the end of the 1888 season, he was purchased by the Brooklyn Bridegrooms.

Collins was the National League leader in runs scored in 1890 with Brooklyn. For his career, he compiled a .284 batting average, a 117 OPS+, 653 runs scored, 319 runs batted in, and 335 stolen bases. He was considered to be very fast.

On 20 July 1891, Collins suffered a serious head injury when he collided with a teammate, Oyster Burns, while both men were pursuing a fly ball. Collins was rendered unconscious for hours, and was out of action for an extended period. He eventually managed to resume his baseball career, but then fell ill with typhoid fever in the spring of 1892. He died in Brooklyn on May 21, 1892, at age 28.

== See also ==
- List of Major League Baseball annual doubles leaders
- List of Major League Baseball annual runs scored leaders
- List of baseball players who died during their careers
