= Steve Toole =

American baseball player (1859–1919)

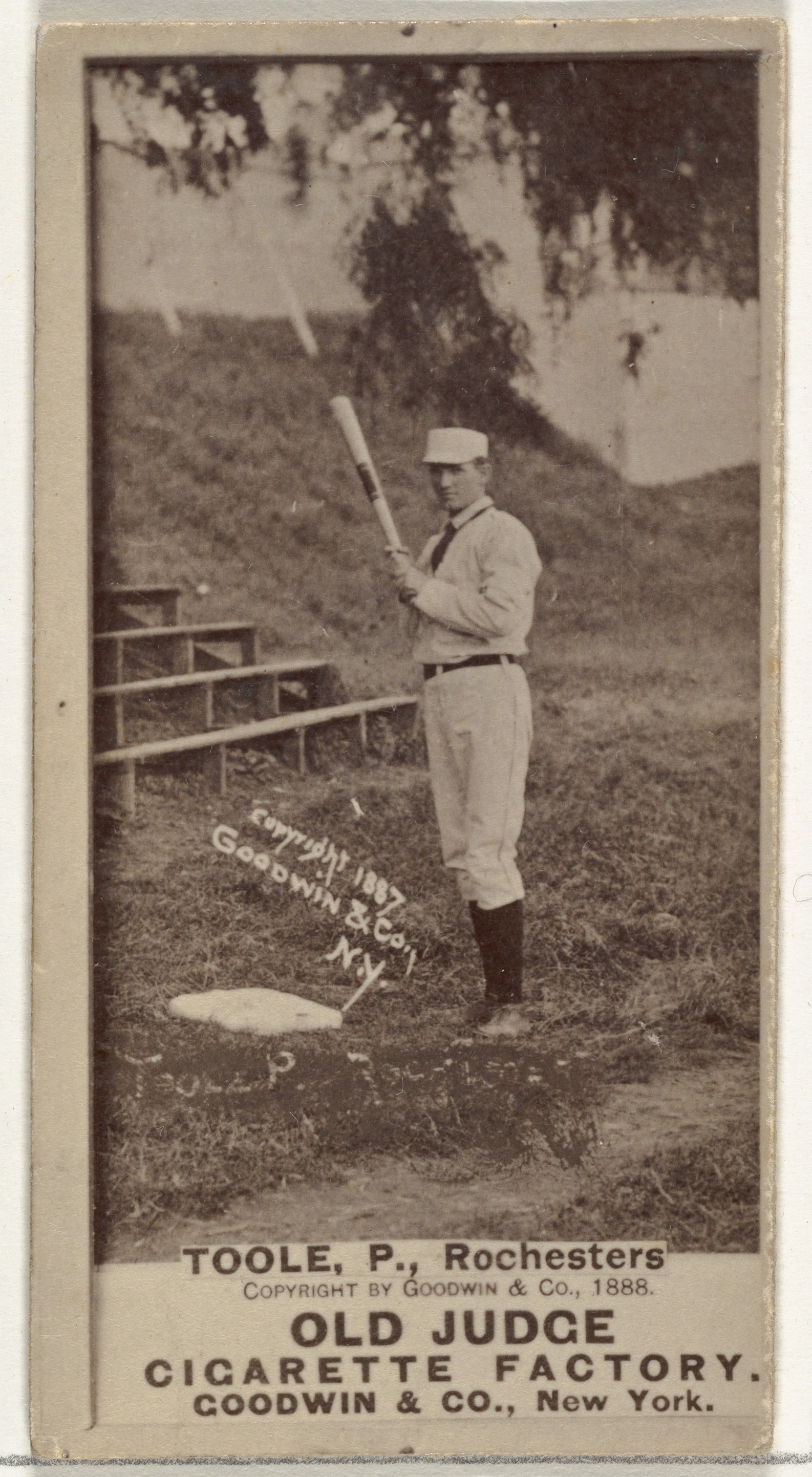
- Pitcher
- Born: April 9, 1859; New Orleans, Louisiana, U.S.
- Died: March 20, 1919 (aged 59); Pittsburgh, Pennsylvania, U.S.
- Batted: Right Threw: Left

MLB debut
- April 20, 1886, for the Brooklyn Grays

Last MLB appearance
- August 9, 1890, for the Brooklyn Gladiators

MLB statistics
- Win–loss record: 27-26
- Earned run average: 4.79
- Strikeouts: 141
- Stats at Baseball Reference

Teams
- Brooklyn Grays (1886–1887); Kansas City Cowboys (1888); Brooklyn Gladiators (1890)

Stephen John Toole (April 9, 1859 – March 20, 1919) was an American 19th-century Major League Baseball player.

== Biography ==
Steve Toole was born in New Orleans on April 9, 1859. He pitched from 1886 to 1890 in the American Association.

He was elected a commissioner of Allegheny County in November 1908, after campaigning by visiting voters on foot.

He died in Pittsburgh on March 20, 1919.
