= Frank Hoffman (baseball) =

American baseball player

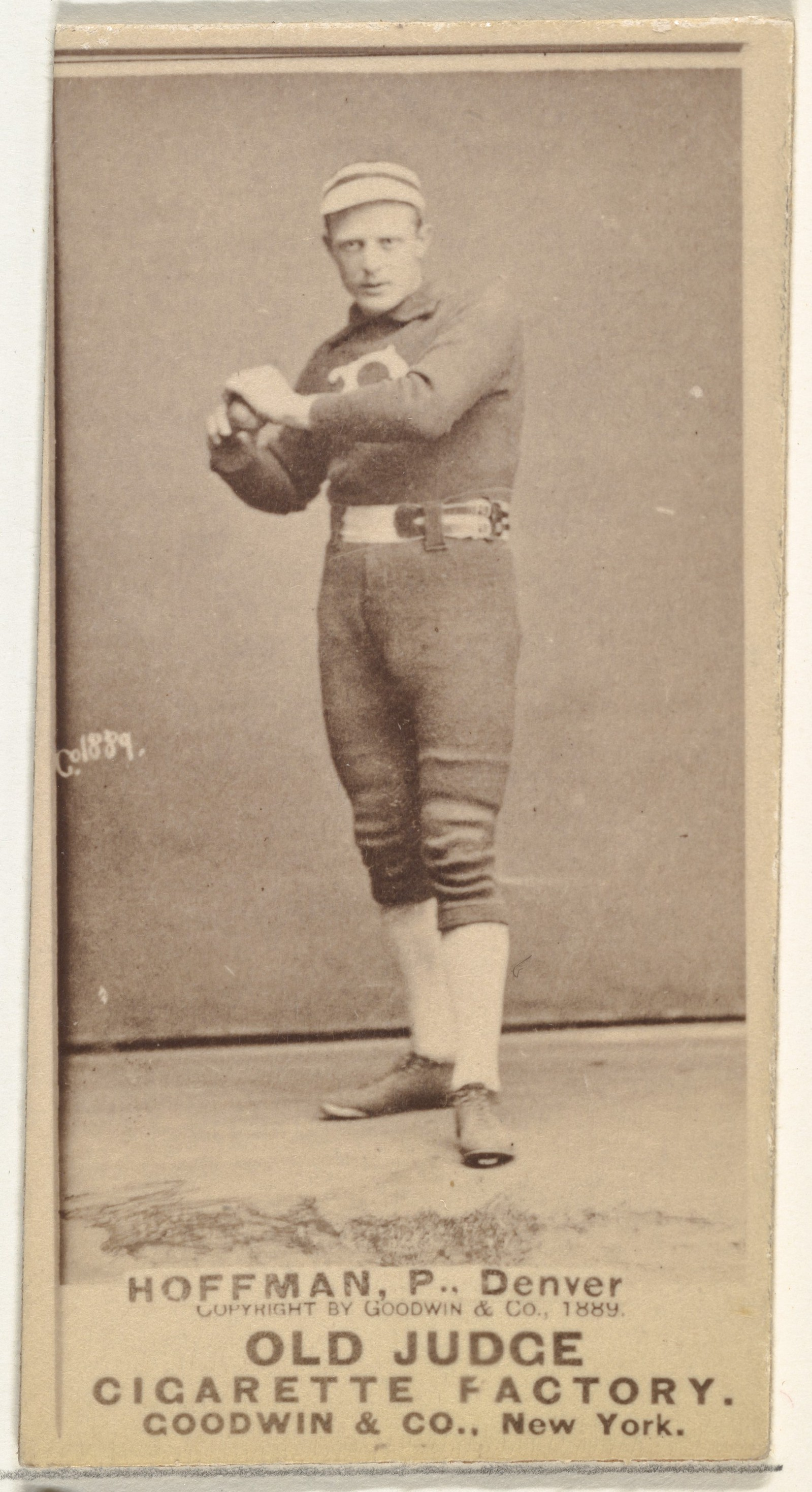
- Pitcher
- Born: Unknown; Houston, Texas, U.S.
- Died: Unknown
- Batted: Unknown Threw: Right

MLB debut
- August 13, 1888, for the Kansas City Cowboys

Last MLB appearance
- October 10, 1888, for the Kansas City Cowboys

MLB statistics
- Win–loss record: 3-9
- Strikeouts: 38
- Earned run average: 2.77
- Stats at Baseball Reference

Teams
- Kansas City Cowboys (1888)

Frank J. Hoffman (a.k.a. "the Texas Wonder"), was an American Major League Baseball pitcher. He pitched in 12 games for the 1888 Kansas City Cowboys of the American Association. He played in the minor leagues through 1892.
