= Nat Hudson =

American baseball player (1869-1928)

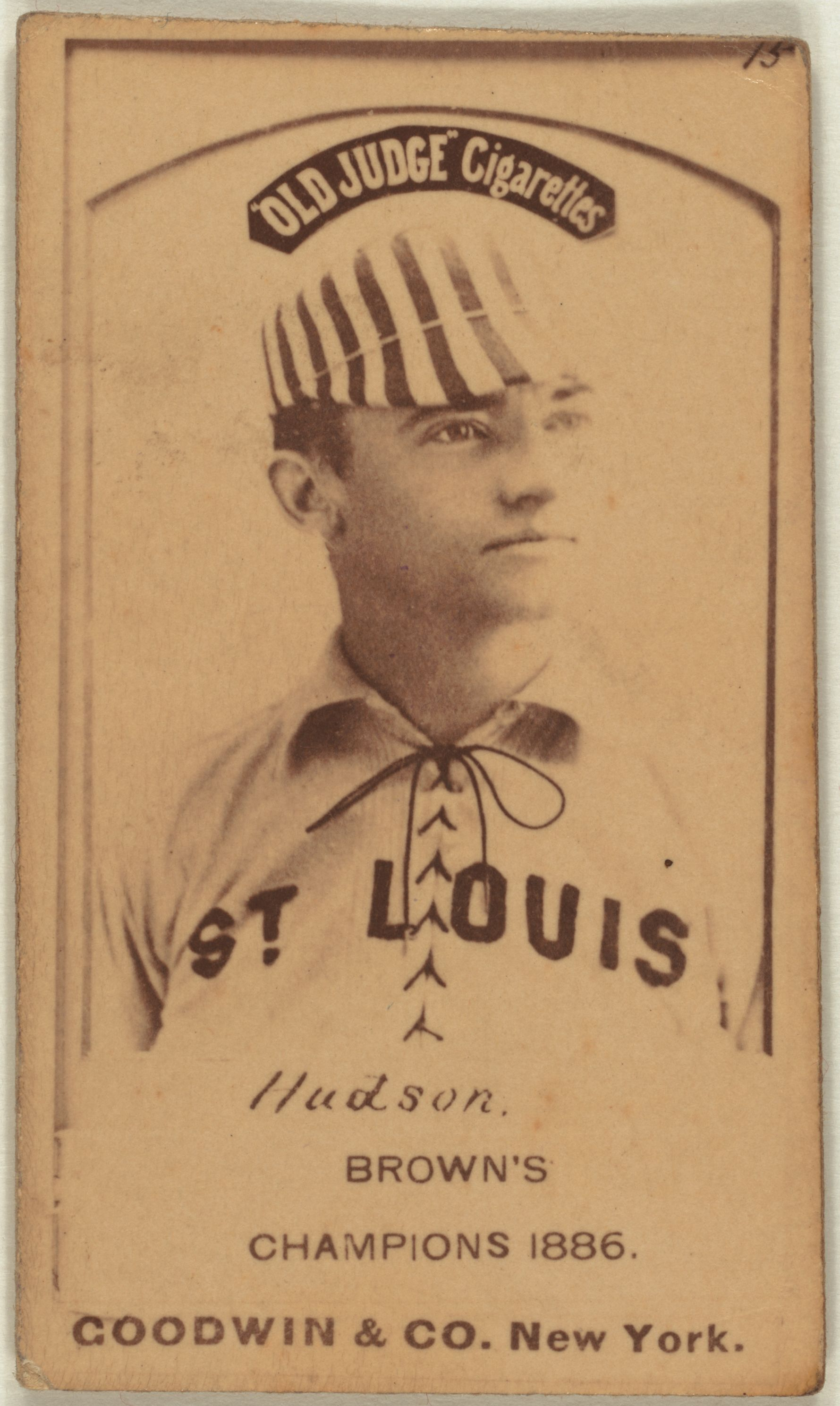
- Pitcher
- Born: January 12, 1869; Chicago, Illinois, U.S.
- Died: March 14, 1928 (aged 59); Chicago, Illinois, U.S.
- Batted: Right Threw: Right

MLB debut
- April 18, 1886, for the St. Louis Browns

Last MLB appearance
- June 27, 1889, for the St. Louis Browns

MLB statistics
- Win–loss record: 48–26
- Earned run average: 3.08
- Strikeouts: 258
- Stats at Baseball Reference

Teams
- St. Louis Browns (1886–1889)

Nathaniel P. Hudson (1869 – March 14, 1928) was an American Major League Baseball (MLB) pitcher for the St. Louis Browns from 1886 to 1889.

Hudson started his professional baseball career at the age of 15, with Quincy of the Northwestern League. In 1886, he signed with the Browns and went 16–10 for them. He also started and won one game in the 1886 World Series against the National League's Chicago White Stockings.

Hudson had his best season in 1888, going 25–10 with a 2.54 earned run average and leading the American Association in winning percentage. His career record was 48 wins and 26 losses.

On July 17, 1889, Hudson was traded to the Louisville Colonels in exchange for Toad Ramsey; however, he refused to report to Louisville and never played another major league game. On August 18, he was sold for $1,000 to the Minneapolis Millers of the Western Association. He played two seasons for them before retiring.

Hudson died in his hometown of Chicago, Illinois, in 1928. He is interred at Rosehill Cemetery.
