= Adonis Terry =

American baseball player (1864–1915)

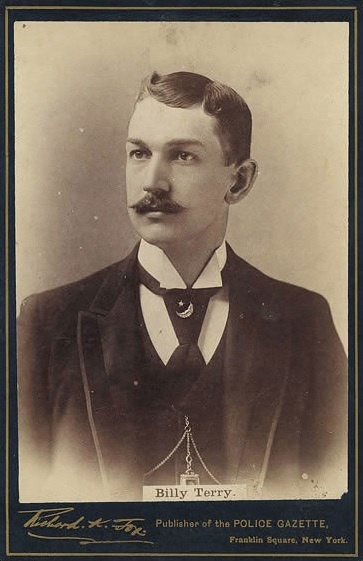
- Pitcher / Outfielder
- Born: August 7, 1864; Westfield, Massachusetts, U.S.
- Died: February 24, 1915 (aged 50); Milwaukee, Wisconsin, U.S.
- Batted: Right Threw: Right

MLB debut
- May 1, 1884, for the Brooklyn Grays

Last MLB appearance
- April 27, 1897, for the Chicago Colts

MLB statistics
- Win–loss record: 197–196
- Earned run average: 3.74
- Strikeouts: 1,553
- Stats at Baseball Reference

Teams
- Brooklyn Atlantics / Grays / Bridegrooms / Grooms (1884–1891); Baltimore Orioles (1892); Pittsburgh Pirates (1892–1894); Chicago Colts (1894–1897)

Career highlights and awards
- Pitched two no-hitters (1886, 1888)

William H. "Adonis" Terry (August 7, 1864 – February 24, 1915) was an American Major League Baseball player whose career spanned from his debut with the Brooklyn Atlantics in 1884, to the Chicago Colts in 1897. In his 14 seasons, he compiled a 197-196 win–loss record, winning 20 or more games in a season four different times.

== Career ==
=== Brooklyn ===
Born in Westfield, Massachusetts, Terry began his professional career with the minor league Brooklyn Grays in 1883, who won the Interstate Championship that season. The following season, the team was admitted into the American Association as the Brooklyn Atlantics, and he stayed with the team. In that 1884 season, the team finished in ninth place, and his win–loss record reflected that. Although his record was 19–35, he led the team with an earned run average of 3.55, and struck out 230 hitters.

Over the next three seasons, Terry had average-to-good seasons, had a combined record of 40 wins and 49 losses, even throwing a no-hitter against the St. Louis Browns on July 24, 1886. But it was not until 1888 that he turned into a star pitcher. In that season, he had a 13–8 record, a 2.03 ERA, and tossed his second no-hitter, this time against the Louisville Colonels on May 27, 1888.

In 1889, the team won the American Association championship with Terry winning 22 games. He pitched five games, winning two, in the "World Series" after the season with the New York Giants, a series that Brooklyn lost six games to three. The Bridegrooms joined the National League in 1890, and again finished first behind Terry's 26–16 record and the team tied the Louisville team of the American Association in the World Series with three wins and three losses each and one tie. The 1891 season turned out to be a disappointment for both Brooklyn and Terry, as the team finished in sixth place and Terry record fell to 6-16 and a 4.22 ERA.

An early tobacco card of Adonis Terry

=== Pittsburgh ===
On June 10, 1892, Brooklyn released Terry, and was quickly signed by the Baltimore Orioles on June 14. He played just one game for Baltimore, a complete games loss, and was then traded to the Pittsburgh Pirates on June 17 in exchange for Cub Stricker. He pitched well in his 2-plus seasons for Pittsburgh, winning 18 games in 1892 and 12 more in 1893.

=== Chicago ===
In 1894, he changed teams for the last time. After pitching in one game for the Pirates, he was then picked up by the Chicago Colts and had moderate success in his four seasons with them. He went on to win 21 games in 1895 and 15 more in 1896.

On July 13, 1896, he had the unfortunate distinction of giving up all four home runs to Philadelphia Phillie hall-of-Famer Ed Delahanty in a game played at the old West Side Grounds. Pitching the complete game, he and his Colts were able to prevail, winning the game 9–8. He played only one game the following season in 1897, a complete-game loss, before his career came to end.

His career totals include a 197 wins and 196 losses, a 3.74 ERA, and 1,553 strikeouts in 3,514.1 innings pitched. He was also a versatile player, often playing other positions, including 216 games in the outfield, with games also played at shortstop, first base and third base.

== Post-career ==
=== Umpiring ===
After his Major League career was over, he became an umpire for 39 games in the 1900 National League season. He had filled the umpire position from time to time during his playing days. In total, he umpired 51 games, 48 of them as the home plate umpire, as the custom was that there was only one umpire used in each game.

=== Death ===
Adonis is the honoree of old-time baseball events that are held in his hometown of Westfield, such as the group Westfield Wheelmen Vintage Base Ball Club. Terry died in Milwaukee, Wisconsin at the age of 50 from an episode of pneumonia, and was cremated.

== See also ==
- List of Major League Baseball no-hitters

Achievements
Preceded by Al Atkinson	No-hitter pitcher July 24, 1886	Succeeded by Matt Kilroy
Preceded by Matt Kilroy	No-hitter pitcher May 27, 1888	Succeeded by Henry Porter
