= John Weyhing =

American baseball player (1869–1890)

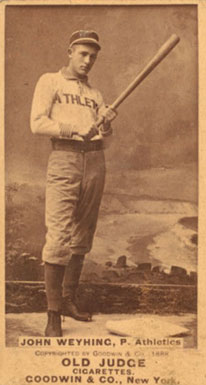
- Pitcher
- Born: June 24, 1869; Louisville, Kentucky, U.S.
- Died: June 20, 1890 (aged 20); Louisville, Kentucky, U.S.
- Batted: Left Threw: Left

MLB debut
- July 13, 1888, for the Cincinnati Red Stockings

Last MLB appearance
- April 20, 1889, for the Columbus Solons

MLB statistics
- Win–loss record: 3-4
- Earned run average: 1.62
- Strikeouts: 30
- Stats at Baseball Reference

Teams
- Cincinnati Red Stockings (1889); Columbus Solons (1890)

John Weyhing (June 24, 1869 – June 20, 1890) was an American left-handed pitcher who played for the Cincinnati Red Stockings in 1888 and Columbus Solons in 1889. The brother of pitcher Gus Weyhing, he died at age 20.

He made his debut on July 13, 1888, at the age of 19 – the third youngest player in the league. In eight games that year, he went 3–4 with a 1.23 ERA and seven complete games. He pitched 65 2/3 innings, allowing 52 hits and 17 walks while striking out 30 batters. Though he gave up 26 runs, only nine of them were earned.

On December 14, 1888, he was purchased by the Solons from the Red Stockings.

In 1889, he appeared in only one game, which would prove to be the final game of his career. On April 20, he pitched one inning, allowing three runs for a 27.00 ERA. He contracted tuberculosis, prematurely ending his career and life.

Overall, Weyhing pitched in nine big league games, starting eight of them. He went 3–4 with a 1.62 ERA.
