= Oyster Burns =

American baseball player (1864–1928)

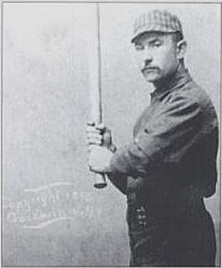
- Burns in 1888
- Outfielder
- Born: September 6, 1864; Philadelphia, Pennsylvania, U.S.
- Died: November 11, 1928 (aged 64); Brooklyn, New York, U.S.
- Batted: Right Threw: Right

Major-league debut
- August 18, 1884, for the Wilmington Quicksteps

Last major-league appearance
- September 16, 1895, for the New York Giants

Major-league statistics
- Batting average: .300
- Home runs: 65
- Runs batted in: 834
- Stats at Baseball Reference

Teams
- Wilmington Quicksteps (1884); Baltimore Orioles (1884–1885, 1887–1888); Brooklyn Bridegrooms (1888–1895); New York Giants (1895)

Career highlights and awards
- NL home run leader (1890); NL RBI leader (1890)

Thomas P. "Oyster" Burns (September 6, 1864 – November 11, 1928) was an American professional baseball player whose career spanned 15 seasons, 11 of which were spent with in the major leagues, with the Wilmington Quicksteps (1884), Baltimore Orioles (1884–85, 1887–88), Brooklyn Bridegrooms (1888–1895), and New York Giants (1895). Burns, who predominately played as an outfielder, also played as a shortstop, second baseman, third baseman, and pitcher. Over his career, Burns compiled a major-league career batting average of .300 with 870 runs scored, 1,392 hits, 224 doubles, 129 triples, 65 home runs, and 834 runs batted in (RBI) in 1,188 games played. Although the majority of his career was spent in the major leagues, Burns also played in minor-league baseball. He made his major-league debut at the age of 19 and was listed as standing 5 feet 8 inches (173 cm) and weighing 183 pounds (83 kg).

Burns, nicknamed "Oyster" because he sold shellfish in the off-season, was described as a "loudmouth" and having "an irritating voice and personality". He led the Bridegrooms to an American Association championship in 1889 and a National League pennant in 1890. After retiring from baseball, Burns died on November 11, 1928, in Brooklyn, New York.

== Biography ==
Thomas P. Burns was born on September 6, 1864, in Philadelphia. His parents, Patrick and Mary Burns, were both Irish immigrants.

In 1883, Burns began his professional baseball career as an outfielder and pitcher with Harrisburg of the minor-league Interstate Association. He had a batting average of .220 in 69 games. As a pitcher, Burns posted an earned run average (ERA) of 2.30 over 20 games pitched, 15 of which were starts.

"He was a disturber and one of the worst that ever played ball. His disposition was very bad, and he made it unpleasant for any of the boys that crested him. He is what you would call a bulldozer. [Bridegrooms manager Bill] McGunnigle may be able to handle Burns, but I doubt it."

— A teammate of Burns on the Orioles

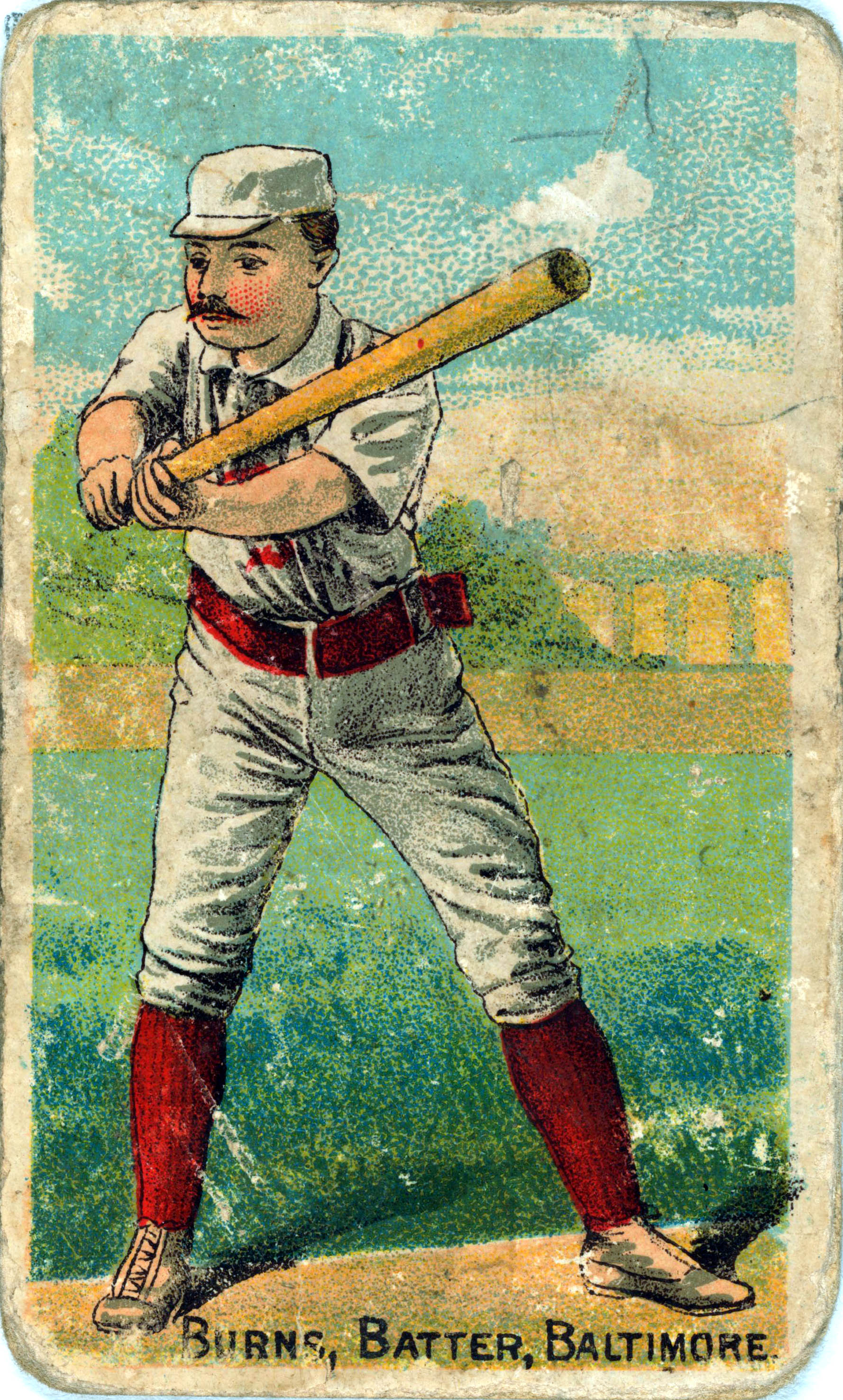
1887 baseball card of Burns

Burns began the 1884 season playing for the Wilmington Quicksteps, but left the team after they joined the Union Association, and joined the Baltimore Orioles. Burns—the youngest player on the Orioles and the seventh youngest player in the American Association— batted .298. Despite playing in only 35 games on the season, Burns recorded a team-leading six home runs over 141 plate appearances. He continued his career with the Orioles in 1885, batting .231 with five home runs and 37 RBI, and pitching to a 7–4 win–loss record. His offensive struggles led him to be demoted to the Newark Domestics for the 1886 season, where he helped the Domestics win the Eastern League pennant. Burns led the league in batting average (.352), slugging percentage (.558), and home runs (10). By 1887, Burns had reentered the majors for the Orioles and became the team captain until he threw a baseball at an opposing pitcher following a groundout; he was later fined $25 ($896 in 2011). On the season, he recorded nine home runs—good for third in the American Association. Burns's 19 triples were enough to tie him with five others for the league lead, and his 140 games played were tied for the league lead with teammate Blondie Purcell.

After playing in 79 games for Baltimore in 1888, Burns was transferred to the Brooklyn Bridegrooms by Harry Von der Horst, the owner of both clubs. While he was playing for the Bridegrooms, the New York Clipper described Burns as "the noisiest man that ever played on the Brooklyn team. His voice reminds one of a buzz-saw." Burns remained with the Bridegrooms for the 1889 season. He recorded team highs in on-base percentage, batting average, and home runs, while the Bridegrooms, with an 89–48 record, became American Association champions. In the 1889 World Series, the Bridegrooms played the New York Giants of the National League. Burns hit a three-run home run to win the fourth game of the series, giving Brooklyn a 3–1 series lead. However, the Giants would take the World Series after winning five straight games.

In 1890, the Bridegrooms had moved to the National League. Burns, now 26, led the league in home runs (13) and RBI (128). He hit for the cycle on August 1, 1890—becoming the first Bridegroom to do so. The team won the National League pennant, and faced the Louisville Colonels in the 1890 World Series. The series ended in a 3–3–1 tie: bad weather led to the cancellation of more games. After the 1891 season, Burns' 1892 RBI total was third in the league, and his hits, doubles, triples, and batting average marks were the second highest on the Brooklyn team, now named the Grooms. In 1893, between games of a doubleheader, a teammate of Burns, Tom Daly, was sleeping in center field when Burns stabbed Daly with a penknife. Daly awoke and turned on the knife, leading to a severed tendon which kept Daly out for two weeks. Burns' 1894 batting average (.355) was the highest of his career; his hit and run totals were also the second highest in his career. Burns continued to play for the club until 1895, when he played for the New York Giants. In his final major-league season, he batted a combined .258 over 53 games.

In 1896, Burns' contract was purchased by the minor-league Newark Colts. The Colts won the Atlantic League with an 82–61 record, two games above the Hartford Bluebirds, as Burns batted .378. The next season, Burns served as a player-coach for the Bluebirds, where he led the team in doubles and batting average. In 1901, his final managerial year, he managed the Portland, Maine team of the New England League.

After retiring from baseball, Burns lived in Brooklyn until his death on November 11, 1928. He was buried in Holy Cross Cemetery in North Arlington, New Jersey.

== See also ==
- List of Major League Baseball career triples leaders
- List of Major League Baseball annual home run leaders
- List of Major League Baseball annual runs batted in leaders
- List of Major League Baseball annual triples leaders
- List of Major League Baseball annual saves leaders
- List of Major League Baseball players to hit for the cycle

Achievements
Preceded by Roger Connor	Hitting for the cycle August 1, 1890	Succeeded by John Reilly
