= 1888 in baseball =

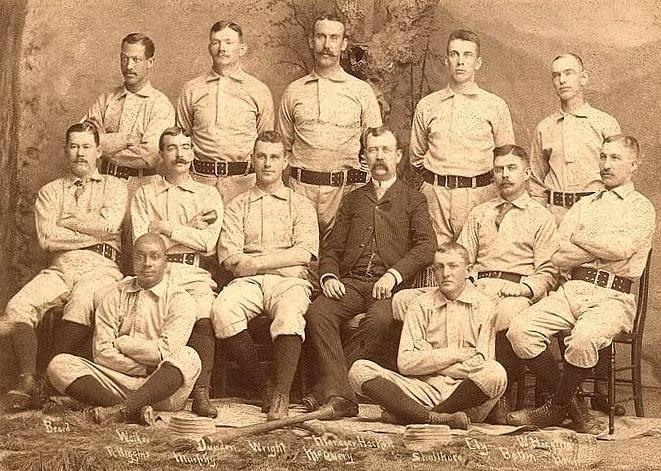
1888 Syracuse Stars baseball team

The following are the baseball events of the year 1888 throughout the world.

== Champions ==
=== Major League Baseball ===
- National League: New York Giants
- American Association: St. Louis Browns

World Series

New York defeated St. Louis, six games to four.

== Statistical leaders ==
	American Association		National League	
Stat	Player	Total	Player	Total
AVG	Tip O'Neill (STL)	.335	Cap Anson (CHI)	.344
HR	John Reilly (CIN)	13	Jimmy Ryan (CHI)	16
RBI	John Reilly (CIN)	103	Cap Anson (CHI)	84
W	Silver King (STL)	45	Tim Keefe^{1} (NYG)	35
ERA	Silver King (STL)	1.63	Tim Keefe^{1} (NYG)	1.74
K	Ed Seward (PHA)	272	Tim Keefe^{1} (NYG)	335

^{1} National League Triple Crown pitching winner

== Major league baseball final standings ==
Note: team nicknames are given here according to the modern retroactive convention. According to the 1889 Spalding Official Guide, however, which covered the 1888 season, no nicknames were used for any team - aside from Athletic - with the exception of "Giants" (always within quotation marks).

=== American Association final standings ===
American Association
Team	W	L	Pct.	GB	Home	Road
St. Louis Browns	92	43	.681	—	60‍–‍21	32‍–‍22
Brooklyn Bridegrooms	88	52	.629	6½	53‍–‍20	35‍–‍32
Philadelphia Athletics	81	52	.609	10	55‍–‍20	26‍–‍32
Cincinnati Red Stockings	80	54	.597	11½	56‍–‍25	24‍–‍29
Baltimore Orioles	57	80	.416	36	30‍–‍26	27‍–‍54
Cleveland Blues	50	82	.379	40½	33‍–‍27	17‍–‍55
Louisville Colonels	48	87	.356	44	27‍–‍29	21‍–‍58
Kansas City Cowboys	43	89	.326	47½	23‍–‍34	20‍–‍55

Locations of teams for the 1888 American Association season
American Association

=== National League final standings ===
National League
Team	W	L	Pct.	GB	Home	Road
New York Giants	84	47	.641	—	44‍–‍23	40‍–‍24
Chicago White Stockings	77	58	.570	9	43‍–‍27	34‍–‍31
Philadelphia Quakers	69	61	.531	14½	37‍–‍29	32‍–‍32
Boston Beaneaters	70	64	.522	15½	36‍–‍30	34‍–‍34
Detroit Wolverines	68	63	.519	16	40‍–‍26	28‍–‍37
Pittsburgh Alleghenys	66	68	.493	19½	37‍–‍30	29‍–‍38
Indianapolis Hoosiers	50	85	.370	36	31‍–‍35	19‍–‍50
Washington Nationals	48	86	.358	37½	26‍–‍38	22‍–‍48

Locations of teams for the 1888 National League season
National League

== Events ==
=== January–March ===
- January 2 – Fred Dunlap signs a contract paying him a $5,000 salary and a $2,000 signing bonus. It is the largest contract ever given to a player to date.
- January 15 The Pittsburgh Alleghenys purchase the contract of Billy Sunday from the Chicago White Stockings for $2,000
- January 17 – The Kansas City Cowboys are admitted to the American Association.
- January 27 – The Brooklyn Bridegrooms keep 5 players from the New York Metropolitans that they purchased last October and sell the rest, plus 4 of their own players, to the Kansas City Cowboys for $7,000.
- February 2 – The Indianapolis Hoosiers announce that they will have 42 private boxes on top of their new grandstand. The boxes will only be available to season subscribers.
- February 13 - The Kansas City Cowboys purchase the contract of Jumbo Davis from the Baltimore Orioles of the International League.
- March 2 – The National League reverts to its original policy of a 50¢ admission price with no concessions given to individual clubs.
- March 5 – The American Association votes to adopt the use of turnstiles at all parks in order to better control entry into games.

=== April–June ===
- April 3 – The Chicago White Stockings sell John Clarkson to the Boston Beaneaters for $10,000.
- April 29 – Pitcher Charlie Ferguson dies of typhoid fever at the age of 25.
- May 15 – Philadelphia Athletics outfielder Harry Stovey hits for the cycle in a 12–3 win over the Baltimore Orioles.
- May 21 – The Philadelphia Quakers purchase the contract of Ed Delahanty from Wheeling of the TriState Baseball League.
- May 27 – Adonis Terry pitches the second no-hitter of his career as the Brooklyn Bridegrooms defeat the Louisville Colonels, 4–0.
- June 3 – The poem "Casey at the Bat", by Ernest Thayer, is published for the first time in the San Francisco Examiner.
- June 6 – Henry Porter of the Kansas City Cowboys tosses a no-hitter against the Baltimore Orioles in a 4–0 Kansas City win.
- June 13 – Kansas City Cowboys second baseman Sam Barkley hits for the cycle against the Cincinnati Red Stockings. However, the Cowboys lose 11–6.
- June 21 – George Van Haltren pitches a six-inning no-hitter to beat the Pittsburgh Alleghenys at West Side Park in a rain-shortened contest. He strikes out three and walks one.

=== July–September ===
- July 4 – Albert Spalding, president of the Chicago White Stockings, has two ticket speculators arrested and jailed after they violate a city ordinance that prohibits the selling of tickets on the street.
- July 7 – Dave Foutz of the Brooklyn Bridegrooms, former popular player with the St. Louis Browns, is carried off of the field by Browns fans after he gets the game-winning hit for Brooklyn in a game held in St. Louis.
- July 13 – The Pittsburgh Alleghenys shut out the Boston Beaneaters in both games of a double-header, the first such occurrence in major league history.
- July 14 – Adonis Terry tells his teammates that he heard Kansas City Cowboys manager Sam Barkley order substitute umpire Jim Donahue, who was the Cowboys regular catcher, to call a Bridegroom runner out in the ninth inning of a 5–4 game. The Grooms walked off the field in protest‚ forfeiting the game, resulting in a 9–0 score.
- July 17 – Tommy McCarthy of the St. Louis Browns goes 5 for 5 at the plate to go along with six stolen bases in a game in which the Browns steal 15 bases in all.
- July 26 – Ed Seward of the Philadelphia Athletics pitches a no-hitter in a 12–2 over the Cincinnati Red Stockings.
- July 28 – Jimmy Ryan of the Chicago White Stockings hits for the cycle and pitches 7 innings in relief in a 21–17 win over the Detroit Wolverines. Ryan becomes the first player to hit for the cycle and pitch in the same game.
- July 31 – Gus Weyhing of the Philadelphia Athletics pitches a no-hitter against the Kansas City Cowboys for the second no-hitter by an Athletics pitcher in five games.
- July 31 – "Sliding" Billy Hamilton makes his major league debut with the Kansas City Cowboys.
- August 7 – The American Association votes to allow teams to lower ticket prices to 25¢ and changes the gate guarantee for the visiting team from a percentage to a flat $130.
- August 10 – Tim Keefe of the New York Giants wins his 19th consecutive game, setting a new major league record.
- August 21 – The Detroit Wolverines blow a 2–0 lead by committing six errors in the final 2 innings to lose their 16th game in a row.
- August 22
  - Silver King of the St. Louis Browns loses a no-hitter in the ninth inning when two Browns outfielders let an easy fly ball drop between them.
  - The Indianapolis Hoosiers attempt to play a "night" game at dusk by using methane gas lights.
- August 25 – New York Giants outfielder Mike Tiernan hits for the cycle as the Giants beat the Philadelphia Phillies, 7–0.
- August 29 – Joe Quinn makes his first game as a Boston Beaneater a memorable one by homering in the bottom of the ninth to give Boston a 2–1 win over 30-game winner Tim Keefe.
- September 4 – Pud Galvin became the first pitcher to win 300 games.
- September 6 – The Indianapolis Hoosiers try again to play an evening game with the use of methane gas lights. Unable to generate adequate lighting to play, the Hoosiers drop the idea for good.
- September 7 – Dick Johnston of the Boston Beaneaters leads off the game with a home run for the second straight game.
- September 12 – The New York Giants are forced to forfeit their game with the Chicago White Stockings when they have no available substitutes to replace the injured Buck Ewing in the fifth inning.
- September 15 – Ed Morris of the Pittsburgh Alleghenys pitches his fourth consecutive shutout, setting a National League record that will stand until 1968.
- September 18 – Ben Sanders of the Philadelphia Quakers loses his perfect game with one out in the ninth inning when he allows a single to the Chicago White Stockings pitcher Gus Krock, a .164 career hitter.
- September 20 – Cubs pitcher Frank Dwyer pitches a three-hit shutout in his major league debut, defeating the Washington Nationals 11–0 in the first game of a double-header at West Side Park.
- September 27 – Ed "Cannonball" Crane pitches a seven-inning no-hitter for the New York Giants in their 3–0 win over the Washington Nationals.

=== October–December ===
- October 1 – With darkness looming, the Indianapolis Hoosiers score three runs in the top of the ninth inning to take a 4–2 lead over the Washington Nationals when Washington catcher Connie Mack suddenly develops an "injury" to his finger. The delay causes the game to be called because of darkness with the score reverting to the last completed inning, resulting in a 2–1 Washington victory.
- October 3 – The New York Giants and the St. Louis Browns each clinch their respective league pennants.
- October 5 – Pud Galvin of the Pittsburgh Alleghenys becomes the first pitcher to record 300 career wins with a 5–1 victory over the Washington Nationals.
- October 13 – The National League season comes to a close with the champion New York Giants setting a league attendance record by drawing 305,000 fans for the season.
- October 16
  - Rumours abound of the Detroit Wolverines dropping out of the National League and being replaced by the Cleveland Blues of the American Association after they sell star players Sam Thompson, Dan Brouthers and 30-game winner Pete Conway.
  - The World Series opens with the New York Giants beating the St. Louis Browns, 2–1.
- October 17 – The Browns even the series by taking a 3–0 victory over the Giants.
- October 18 – New York wins Game 3, 4–2, over the Browns.
- October 19 – New York takes a 3–1 series advantage with a 6–3 win over St. Louis.
- October 20 – The Giants score five runs in the bottom of the eighth inning to take a 6–4 victory and a 4–1 lead in the series.
- October 22 – New York wins again in Game 6 by a score of 12–5.
- October 24 – The Browns get a must-win by scoring four runs in the eighth to beat the Giants 7–5.
- October 25 – The New York Giants clinch the series with an 11–3 win over the St. Louis Browns. The final 2 games will be played for revenue purposes with St. Louis winning both contests for an overall series result of 6 games to 4 in favor of the Giants.
- November 10 – A new club is organized in Detroit to compete in the International Association during the next season, in order to take the place of the disbanded Detroit Wolverines, who finished in fifth place in the National League this past season. The Wolverines sell off their stars, including Sam Thompson to the Philadelphia Quakers, as well as the so-called Big Four Dan Brouthers and Hardy Richardson to the Boston Beaneaters, and Jack Rowe and Deacon White to the Pittsburgh Alleghenys.
- November 20 – The Joint Rules Committee reduces the number of balls needed for a walk to 4. With the 4 ball, 3 strike at-bat and overhand pitching rules now in place, baseball in 1889 will be played very similar to the game of today.
- November 21 – The National League formally admits the Cleveland Blues from the American Association. The Blues are the second team to leave the AA for the NL, following the Pittsburgh Alleghenys who made the switch after the 1886 season.
- November 22 – The National League adopts a five-tier salary structure based on a player's on-field abilities and off-field personal habits, with the salary scale ranging from $1,500–2,500 in each tier. The Brotherhood of the Professional Baseball Players is incensed by the classification system, and it will be the impetus for the organization of the Players' League in 1890.
- November 23 – The World Champion New York Giants announce the sale of star player and leader of the Brotherhood of Professional Baseball Players, John Montgomery Ward, to the Washington Nationals for $12,000. The deal will fall through after Ward refuses to abide by the sale.
- December 5 – The Columbus Solons are admitted to the American Association to replace the departed Cleveland Blues.

== Births ==
=== January–April ===
- January 5
  - Rube Foster
  - Jesse Barber
- January 10 – Del Pratt
- January 24 – Pinch Thomas
- February 10 – Lorenza Cobb
- March 4 – Jeff Pfeffer
- March 17 – Ed Klepfer
- April 4 – Tris Speaker
- April 9 – Hippo Vaughn
- April 18
  - Duffy Lewis
  - Tommy McMillan
- April 22 – Harry Sullivan
- April 26
  - Ray Caldwell
  - Olaf Henriksen
- April 29 – Ernie Johnson

=== May–August ===
- May 4 – Ralph Pond
- May 15 – Steve Yerkes
- May 23 – Zack Wheat
- June 29 – Bobby Veach
- July 1 – Ben Taylor
- July 2 – Grover Hartley
- July 12 – Harry Krause
- July 19 – Ed Sweeney
- August 6 – Hy Gunning
- August 10 – Charlie Hartman
- August 15 – Ben Van Dyke
- August 17 – Vince Molyneaux
- August 31 – Wally Rehg

=== September–December ===
- September 6 – Red Faber
- September 8 – Joe Giannini
- September 10 – Marty Krug
- September 15 – Jean Dubuc
- September 19 – Ralph Young
- October 12 – Bill Swanson
- October 26 – Dick Hoblitzel
- October 29 – Earl Yingling
- November 1 – Grover Gilmore
- November 10 – Ben Hunt
- December 5 – Ed Porray
- December 11 – Fred Toney
- December 20 – Fred Merkle

== Deaths ==
- February 5 – Martin Powell, 31, first baseman with a .283 career batting average from 1881 to 1884; led the National League in games played in 1883
- February 19 – Live Oak Taylor, 37, played center field for the 1884 Pittsburgh Alleghenys
- March 24 – Bill Collver, 21, played in 1 game in 1885 for the Boston Red Stockings
- March 30 – Frank Bahret, 29?, played 2 games in 1884 for the Baltimore Monumentals of the Union Association
- April 10 – Denny Mack, 36?, infielder from 1871 to 1883; led the National Association in walks in 1872
- April 29 – Charlie Ferguson, 25, pitcher who won 99 games in his first 4 seasons, including a no-hitter, for the Philadelphia Quakers since 1884; was 30–9 for the 1886 team
- June 28 – Joe Brown, 29, pitcher in 1884–1885
- July 16 – Amos Cross, 27?, catcher for the 1885–87 Louisville Colonels, succeeded by his brother Lave
- July 27 – Ed Cogswell, 34, first baseman who batted over .300 in both 1879 and 1880
- August 12 – Favel Wordsworth, 37, shortstop for the 1873 Elizabeth Resolutes.
- September 25 – John Bass, 40?, batted .303 as the regular shortstop for the Cleveland Forest Citys in 1871, his only full season
- October 16 – Ed Duffy, 44?, regular shortstop for the 1871 Chicago White Stockings
- November 7 – Rit Harrison, 39, went 2–4 in his only career game for the 1875 New Haven Elm Citys
- November 10 – John Glenn, 38, played from 1871 to 1877 with a .267 career average
- November 19 – Len Sowders, 27, center fielder who hit .263 for the Baltimore Orioles in his only season in 1886
- December 29 – Asa Brainard, 47, pitcher for the undefeated 1869 Cincinnati Red Stockings
