= 1884 Philadelphia Quakers season =

National League season

1884 Philadelphia Quakers
- League: National League
- Ballpark: Recreation Park
- City: Philadelphia, Pennsylvania
- Record: 39–73 (.348)
- League place: 6th
- Owners: Al Reach, John Rogers
- Manager: Harry Wright

The 1884 season was the second in the history of the Philadelphia Quakers.

== Regular season ==
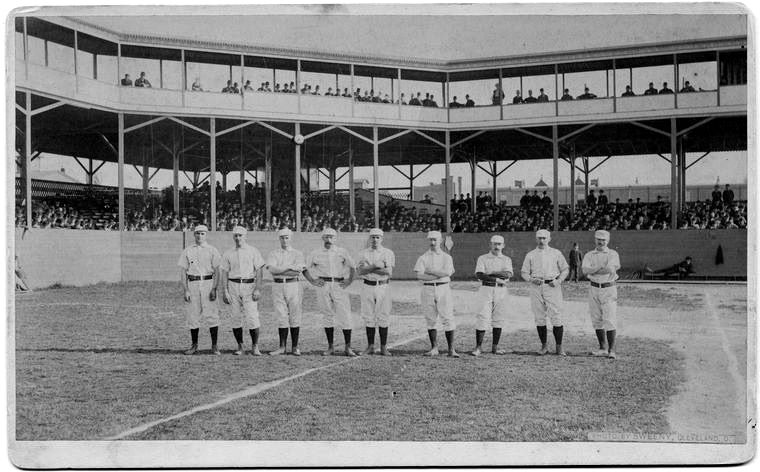
Philadelphia Baseball Club, 1884, Mulvey, Coleman, Farrar, Andrews, Manning

=== Season standings ===
National League
Team	W	L	Pct.	GB	Home	Road
Providence Grays	84	28	.750	—	45‍–‍11	39‍–‍17
Boston Beaneaters	73	38	.658	10½	40‍–‍16	33‍–‍22
Buffalo Bisons	64	47	.577	19½	37‍–‍18	27‍–‍29
New York Gothams	62	50	.554	22	34‍–‍22	28‍–‍28
Chicago White Stockings	62	50	.554	22	39‍–‍17	23‍–‍33
Philadelphia Quakers	39	73	.348	45	19‍–‍37	20‍–‍36
Cleveland Blues	35	77	.312	49	22‍–‍34	13‍–‍43
Detroit Wolverines	28	84	.250	56	18‍–‍38	10‍–‍46

=== Record vs. opponents ===
1884 National League record Sources:
Team	BSN	BUF	CHI	CLE	DET	NYG	PHI	PRO
Boston	—	9–6–2	10–6	14–2	12–4–1	8–8–1	13–3	7–9–1
Buffalo	6–9–2	—	10–6–1	14–2	12–4	5–11–1	11–5	6–10
Chicago	6–10	6–10–1	—	8–8	11–5	12–4	14–2	5–11
Cleveland	2–14	2–14	8–8	—	9–7	5–11	6–10–1	3–13
Detroit	4–12–1	4–12	5–11	7–9	—	2–14–1	5–11	1–15
New York	8–8–1	11–5–1	4–12	11–5	14–2–1	—	11–5	3–13–1
Philadelphia	3–13	5–11	2–14	10–6–1	11–5	5–11	—	3–13
Providence	9–7–1	10–6	11–5	13–3	15–1	13–3–1	13–3	—

=== Notable transactions ===
- August 1884: Frank Ringo was released by the Quakers.

=== Roster ===
1884 Philadelphia Quakers
Roster
Pitchers: Charlie Ferguson; Joe Knight; Jim McElroy; Harry Miller; Sparrow Morton; Con Murphy; Shadow Pyle; Bill Vinton	Catchers: Hezekiah Allen; Jack Clements; Bill Conway; Paul Cook; John Crowley; Andy Cusick; Mike DePangher; Lou Hardie; Joe Kappel; Tom Lynch; Frank Ringo; Ed Sixsmith; Gene Vadeboncoeur	Infielders: Ed Andrews; Sid Farrar; Bill McClellan; Joe Mulvey; Outfielders: John Coleman; Jim Fogarty; Buster Hoover; Jack Manning; Blondie Purcell; Jack Remsen	Manager: Harry Wright

== The Identity of Harry Miller ==
For many years the identity of the pitcher who appeared for the Philadelphia Quakers on October 9, 1884 was wrongly attributed to Joe “Cyclone” Miller. In 2026, newspaper accounts and an obituary were used to identify the pitcher as Harry Miller and confirm that he had pitched in the National League.

== Player stats ==
=== Batting ===
==== Starters by position ====
Note: Pos = Position; G = Games played; AB = At bats; H = Hits; Avg. = Batting average; HR = Home runs; RBI = Runs batted in

Pos	Player	G	AB	H	Avg.	HR	RBI
C	John Crowley	48	168	41	.244	0	19
1B	Sid Farrar	111	428	105	.245	1	45
2B	Ed Andrews	109	420	93	.221	0	23
SS	Bill McClellan	111	450	116	.258	3	33
3B	Joe Mulvey	100	401	92	.229	2	32
OF	Jack Manning	104	424	115	.271	5	52
OF	Jim Fogarty	97	378	80	.212	1	37
OF	Blondie Purcell	103	428	108	.252	1	31

==== Other batters ====
Note: G = Games played; AB = At bats; H = Hits; Avg. = Batting average; HR = Home runs; RBI = Runs batted in

Player	G	AB	H	Avg.	HR	RBI
John Coleman	43	171	42	.246	0	22
Frank Ringo	26	91	12	.132	0	6
Tom Lynch	13	48	15	.313	0	3
Jack Remsen	12	43	9	.209	0	3
Buster Hoover	10	42	8	.190	1	4
Jack Clements	9	30	7	.233	0	0
Andy Cusick	9	29	4	.138	0	1
Joe Kappel	4	15	1	.067	0	0
Gene Vadeboncoeur	4	14	3	.214	0	3
Paul Cook	3	12	1	.083	0	0
Mike DePangher	4	10	2	.200	0	0
Lou Hardie	3	8	3	.375	0	0
Bill Conway	1	4	0	.000	0	0
Hezekiah Allen	1	3	2	.667	0	0
Ed Sixsmith	1	2	0	.000	0	0

=== Pitching ===
==== Starting pitchers ====
Note: G = Games pitched; IP = Innings pitched; W = Wins; L = Losses; ERA = Earned run average; SO = Strikeouts

Player	G	IP	W	L	ERA	SO
Charlie Ferguson	50	416.2	21	25	3.54	194
Bill Vinton	21	182.0	10	10	2.23	105
John Coleman	21	154.1	5	15	4.90	37
Jim McElroy	13	111.0	1	12	4.86	45
Joe Knight	6	51.0	2	4	5.47	8
Con Murphy	3	26.0	0	3	6.58	10
Sparrow Morton	2	17.0	0	2	5.29	5
Harry Miller	1	9.0	0	1	10.00	1
Shadow Pyle	1	9.0	0	1	4.00	4

==== Relief pitchers ====
Note: G = Games pitched; W = Wins; L = Losses; SV = Saves; ERA = Earned run average; SO = Strikeouts

Player	G	W	L	SV	ERA	SO
Blondie Purcell	1	0	0	0	2.25	1
Jim Fogarty	1	0	0	0	0.00	0
