= Bridgeton (baseball) =

- 1895–1897; Bridgeton, New Jersey

Minor league affiliations
- Class: Independent (1895); Class D (1986–1897)
- League: South New Jersey League (1895–1897); New Jersey State League (1897)

Major league affiliations
- Team: None

Minor league titles
- League titles (1): 1897

Team data
- Name: Bridgeton (1895–1897)
- Ballpark: Unknown (1895–1897)

The Bridgeton team was a minor league baseball team based in Bridgeton, New Jersey. Bridgeton teams played as members of the South New Jersey League from 1895 to 1896. The team then joined the Class D level New Jersey State League in 1897.

The Bridgeton team was without a known team nickname, common in the early baseball era.

== History ==
Bridgeton first played as members of the Independent level South New Jersey League in 1895 and 1896. Standings, records and statistics from the league during the two seasons are unknown.

Minor league baseball continued in Bridgeton, New Jersey when the Bridgeton team played as a member of the 1897 New Jersey State League. The league was a four–team Class D level league. The New Jersey State League was formed with the teams based in Asbury, Atlantic City and Millville joining Bridgeton as the charter members.

After beginning play on April 14, 1897, the New Jersey State League season ended on June 1, 1897. The player statistics and team records from the 1897 league are unknown. One source lists the team standings in the order of: Bridgeton, Millville, Asbury Park and Atlantic City, but without final records to align with the order of finish.

The New Jersey State League permanently folded after the 1897 season. Some sources also refer to Bridgeton as playing in a 1897 South New Jersey League with Clayton, Millville and Vineland, but no records or rosters exist. Bridgeton has not hosted another minor league team since 1897.

== The ballpark ==
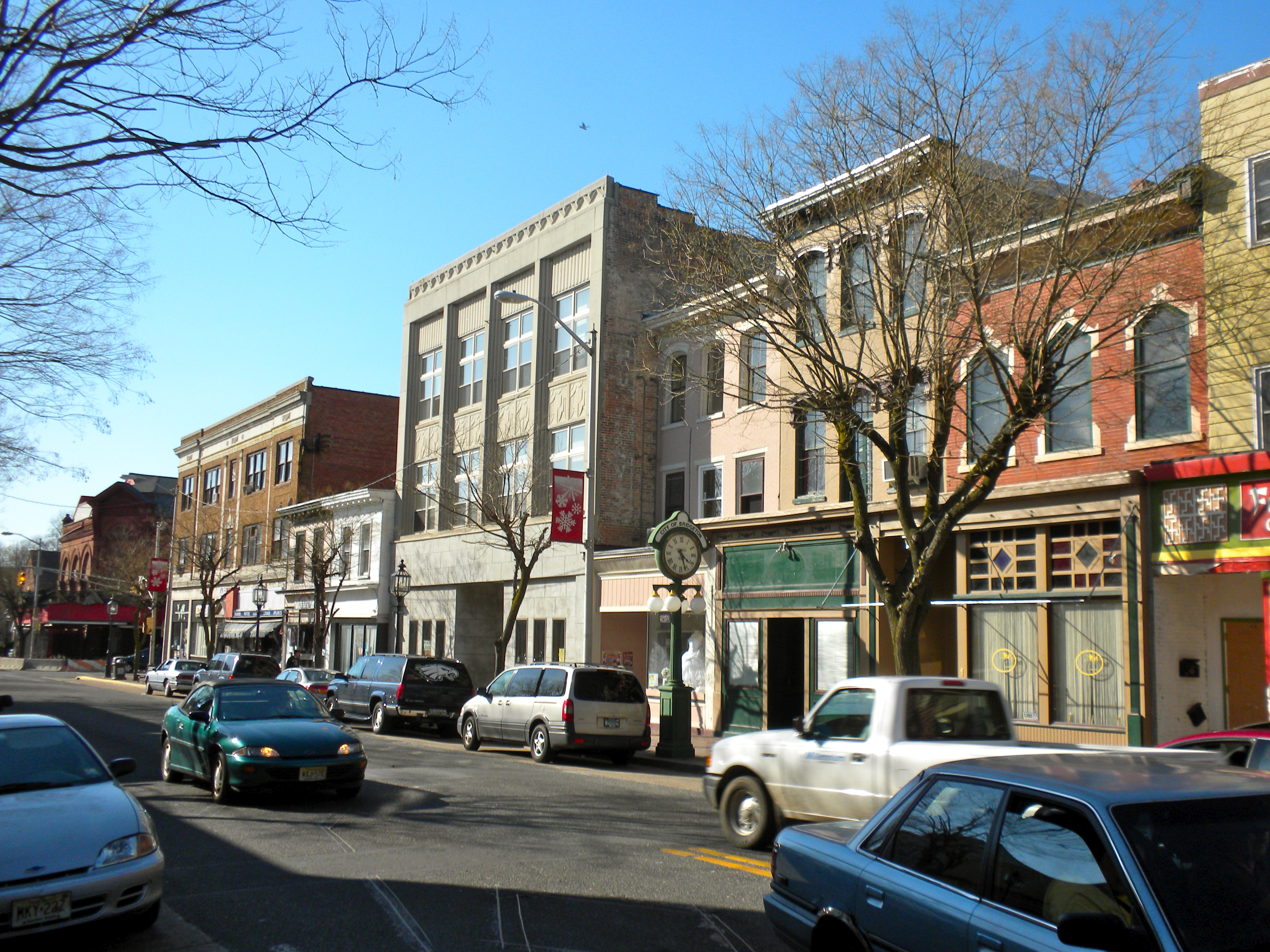
(2012) Downtown Bridgeton. National Register of Historic Places. Bridgeton, New Jersey

The name and location of the Bridgeton home ballpark in 1897 is not known. The Field site was in use in the era for baseball, located at 4 Burt Street, Bridgeton, New Jersey.

== Timeline ==
Year(s)	# Yrs.	Team	Level	League
1895	1	Bridgeton	Independent	South New Jersey League
1896	1	Bridgeton	Class D	South New Jersey League
1897 (1)	1	Bridgeton	Class D	New Jersey State League
1897 (2)	1	Bridgeton	Independent	South New Jersey League

== Year–by–year records ==
Year	Record	Finish	Manager	Playoffs/Notes
1895	00–00	NA	NA	Team records unknown
1896	00–00	NA	NA	Team records unknown
1897	00–00	1st*	NA	Team records unknown

== Notable alumni ==
- Alexander Donoghue (1895)
- Heinie Kappel (1895)
- Joe Kappel (1895–1896)
- Bill Rotes (1895)
- Jack Scheible (1895)
- Stan Yerkes (1896)
- Roster information for the 1897 Bridgeton team is unknown

== See also ==
- Bridgeton (minor league baseball) players
