= South New Jersey League =

- Classification: Independent (1895); Class D (1896); Independent (1897)
- Sport: Minor League Baseball
- First season: 1895
- Folded: 1897
- President: Unknown (1895–1897)
- No. of teams: 6
- Country: United States of America
- Most titles: Unknown
- Related competitions: New Jersey State League (1897)

The South New Jersey League was a minor league baseball league that played from 1895 to 1897. The Independent and Class D level South New Jersey League member teams were based exclusively in New Jersey.

== History ==
The South New Jersey League was formed for the 1895 season as an Independent level minor league. The charter league members were the teams from Bridgeton, New Jersey, Millville and Salem, New Jersey. No 1895 league standings or statistics are known.

In 1896, the South New Jersey League became a Class D level league. The league became a four–team league, adding the Camden, New Jersey league as a member.

The South New Jersey League concluded play in 1897 as an Independent level league with four teams. The Vineland, New Jersey team joined Bridgeton, Millville and Salem in 1897 league play.

After the 1897 season was played, the South New Jersey League permanently folded. Bridgeton and Millville teams are also referenced to have played in the 1897 New Jersey State League which permanently folded on June 1, 1897, before completion of its only season.

== South New Jersey League teams ==
Team name(s)	City represented	Ballpark	Year
Bridgeton	Bridgeton, New Jersey	Unknown	1895 to 1897
Camden	Camden, New Jersey	Unknown	1896
Clayton	Clayton, New Jersey	Unknown	1897
Millville	Millville, New Jersey	Unknown	1895 to 1897
Salem	Salem, New Jersey	Unknown	1895 to 1896
Vineland	Vineland, New Jersey	Unknown	1897

== Teams by season ==
- 1895: (3) Bridgeton, Millville, Salem
- 1896: (4) Bridgeton, Camden, Millville, Salem
- 1897: (4) Bridgeton, Clayton, Millville, Vineland

== Notable league alumni ==
- Ed Carfrey (1895), Salem
- Bobby Cargo (1896), Millville
- Alexander Donoghue (1895), Bridgeton
- Dick Harley (1895), Millville
- Heinie Kappel (1895), Bridgeton
- Joe Kappel (1895-1896), Bridgeton
- Mike Kilroy (1896), Millville
- Harry Morelock (1895), Millville
- Doc Potts (1895), Millville
- Bill Rotes (1895), Bridgeton
- Bobby Rothermel (1896), Millville
- Jack Scheible (1895), Bridgeton
- Phenomenal Smith (1895), Millville
- Farmer Steelman (1895), Millville
- Pete Sweeney (1896), Salem
- Frank Todd (1896), Millville
- Stan Yerkes (1896), Bridgeton
