= Philadelphia Phillies all-time roster (M) =

List of baseball players

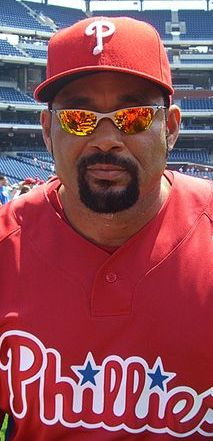
José Mesa is the franchise leader in saves, with 112 during his Phillies career.

The Philadelphia Phillies are a Major League Baseball team based in Philadelphia, Pennsylvania. They are a member of the Eastern Division of Major League Baseball's National League. The team has played officially under two names since beginning play in 1883: the current moniker, as well as the "Quakers", which was used in conjunction with "Phillies" during the team's early history. The team was also known unofficially as the "Blue Jays" during the World War II era. Since the franchise's inception, 2,081 players have made an appearance in a competitive game for the team, whether as an offensive player (batting and baserunning) or a defensive player (fielding, pitching, or both).

Of those 2,081 Phillies, 202 have had surnames beginning with the letter M. Two of those players have been inducted into the Baseball Hall of Fame: left fielder Tommy McCarthy, who played for the Phillies from 1886 to 1887; and second baseman Joe L. Morgan, who played for Philadelphia nearly a century later, in 1983. Three players on this list are members of the Philadelphia Baseball Wall of Fame. Garry Maddox was the Phillies' center fielder for twelve seasons (1975–1986), stealing 248 bases and notching 62 triples. Left fielder Sherry Magee played 11 seasons (1904–1914) in Philadelphia, amassing a .299 batting average, and Tug McGraw pitched from the Phillies' bullpen as closer and setup man for 10 years, amassing 94 saves and recording the final out (a strikeout of Willie Wilson) in the 1980 World Series. Two Phillies on this list hold franchise records: George McQuillan's 1.79 earned run average (ERA) is the best mark among qualifying pitchers,^{[R]} and José Mesa recorded 112 saves in his four seasons with Philadelphia.

Among the 115 batters in this list, second baseman Benny Meyer has the highest batting average (1.000); he hit safely in his only at-bat with the Phillies. Other players with an average about .300 include Art Madison (.353 in one season), Don McCormack (.400 in one season), Irish Meusel (.308 in four seasons), Doc Miller (.307 in two seasons), René Monteagudo (.301 in one season), and Johnny Moore (.329 in four seasons). Magee's 75 home runs and 886 runs batted in lead all members of this list.

Of this list's 89 pitchers, Chuck Malone, Paul Masterson, and Roger McKee share the best win–loss record, in terms of winning percentage; each won one game and lost none in his Phillies career. Erskine Mayer accounted for 76 victories in his 7 seasons with Philadelphia, and Hugh Mulcahy leads all pitchers in this list with 89 defeats. Brett Myers' 986 strikeouts in 8 years are the best total in that category. Brad Moore has the lowest earned run average (ERA) among pitchers in this list, with a 1.08 mark amassed over two seasons; two position players—McCarthy and first baseman Art Mahan—each have 0.00 ERAs in their only Phillies pitching appearances. Kevin Millwood and Terry Mulholland are two of the ten Phillies pitchers who have thrown no-hitters; Mulholland threw his on August 15, 1990, and Millwood accomplished the feat on April 27, 2003.

Two Phillies have made 30% or more of their Phillies appearances as both pitchers and position players. Al Maul batted .282 with five extra-base hits as a left fielder while amassing a 6–5 record and a 5.81 ERA as a pitcher. Elmer Miller allowed 18 runs as a pitcher while notching a .237 average as a right fielder.

Key to symbols in player list(s)
† or ‡	Indicates a member of the National Baseball Hall of Fame and Museum; ‡ indicates that the Phillies are the player's primary team^{[H]}
§	Indicates a member of the Philadelphia Baseball Wall of Fame
*	Indicates a team record^{[R]}
(#)	A number following a player's name indicates that the number was retired by the Phillies in the player's honor.
Year	Italic text indicates that the player is a member of the Phillies' active (25-man) roster.
Position(s)	Indicates the player's primary position(s)^{[P]}
Notes	Statistics shown only for playing time with Phillies^{[S]}
Ref	References

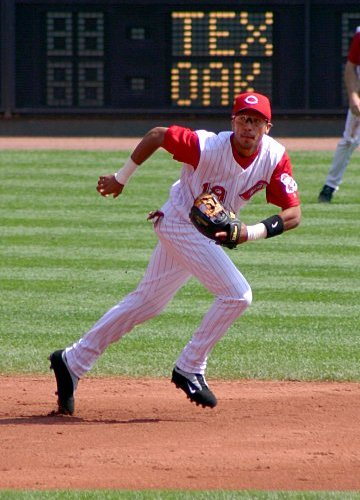
Anderson Machado stole one base in his only Phillies season.

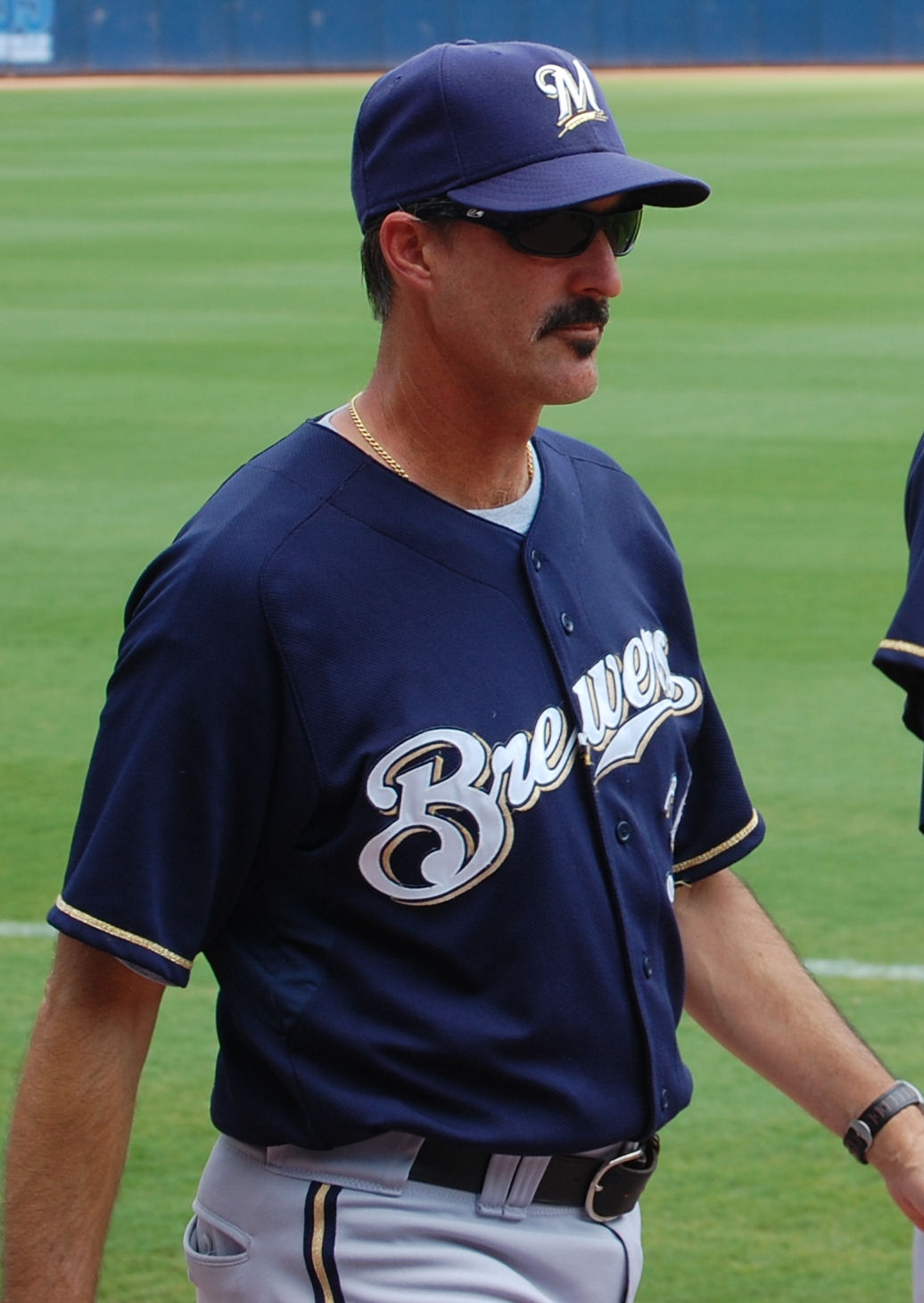
Mike Maddux lost three more games than he won in his Phillies career.

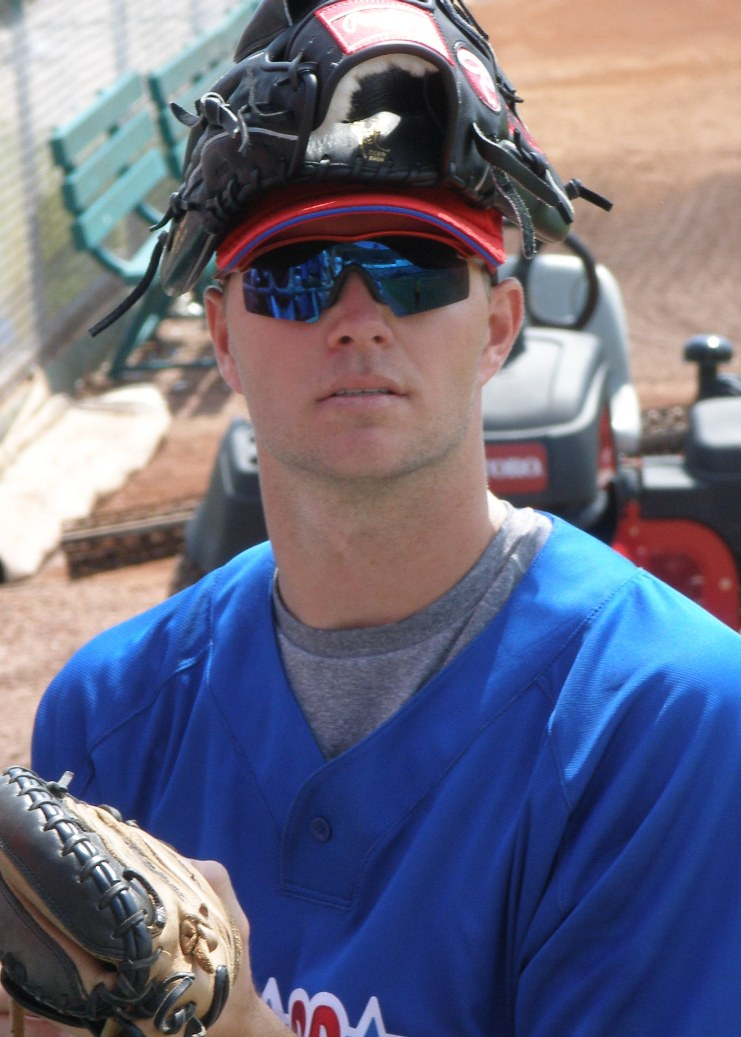
Ryan Madson has struck out nearly 500 batters through the 2010 season.

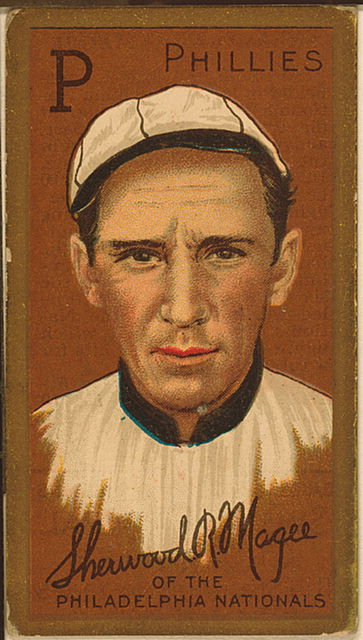
In 11 seasons with Philadelphia, Sherry Magee accumulated a .299 batting average.

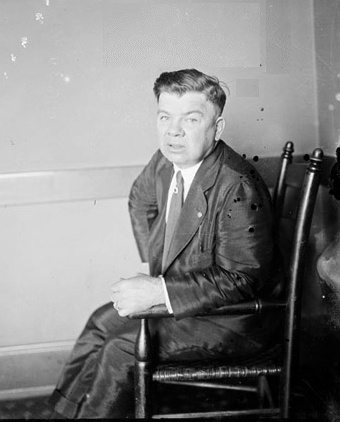
Billy Maharg collected a single plate appearance with the Phillies in 1916.

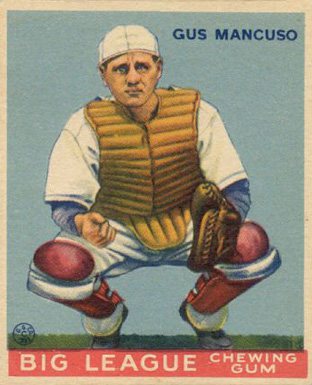
Gus Mancuso hit five doubles in his only Phillies season.

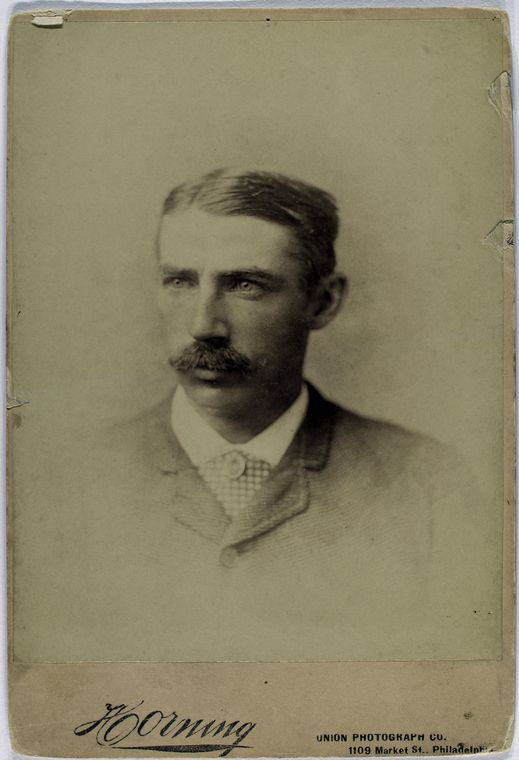
Jack Manning played for the Phillies during their first three seasons.

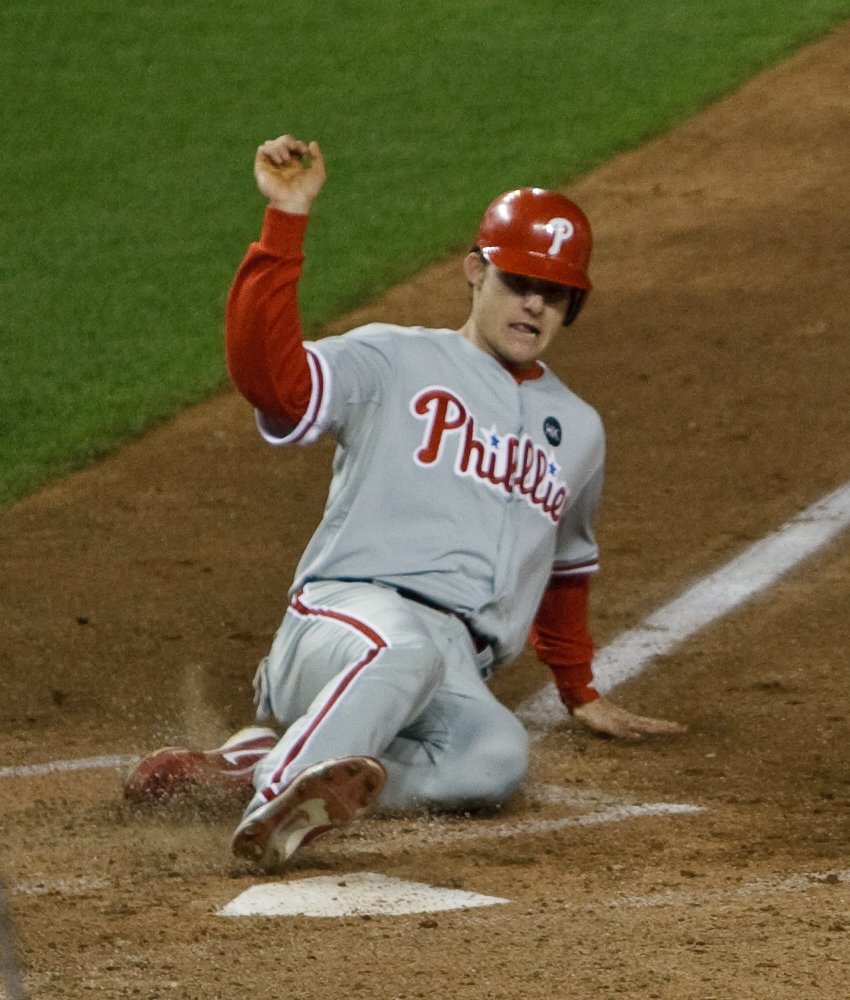
Lou Marson hit a single home run in his two seasons with Philadelphia.

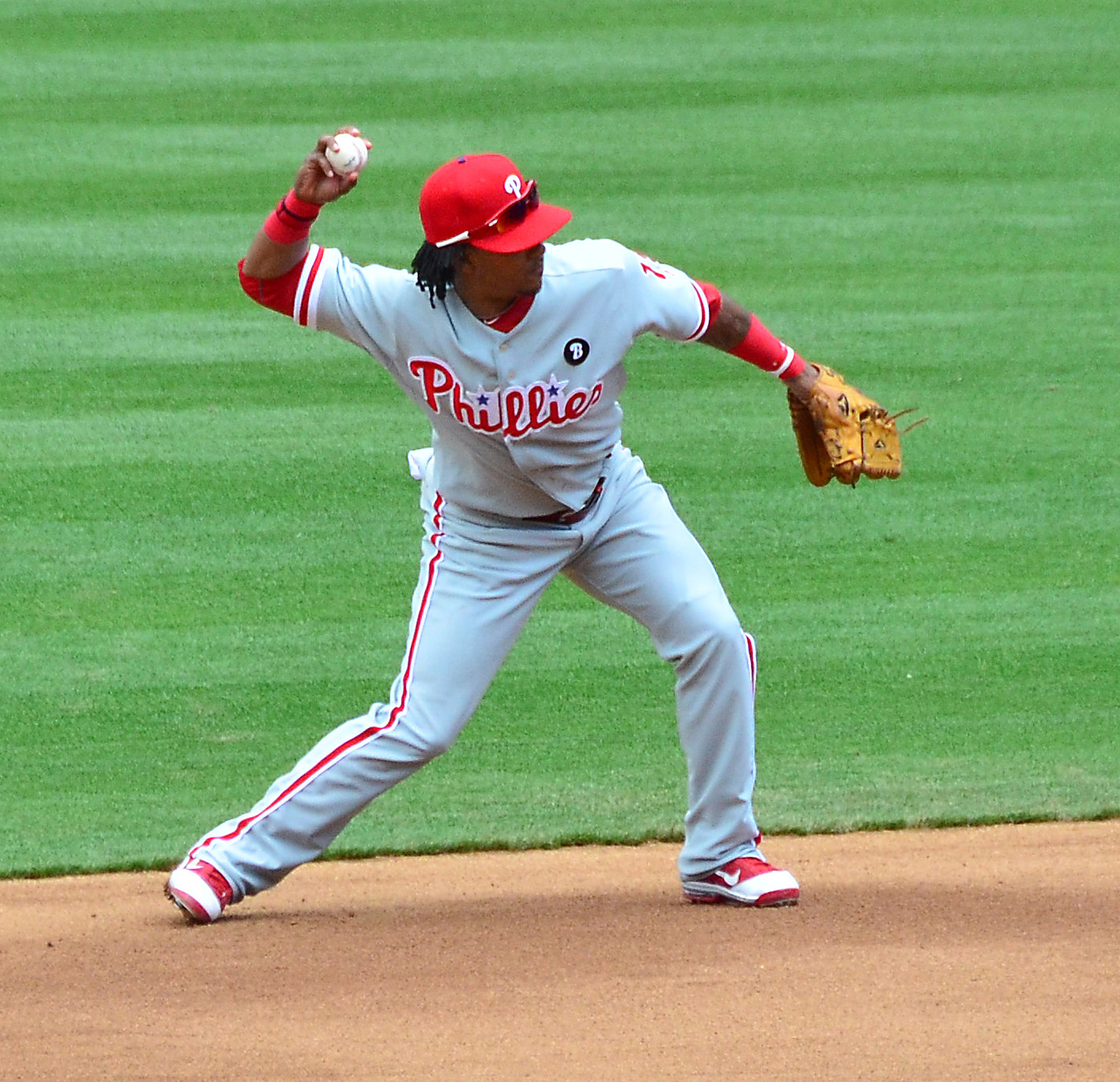
Michael Martínez appeared at multiple positions for the Phillies during his first season.

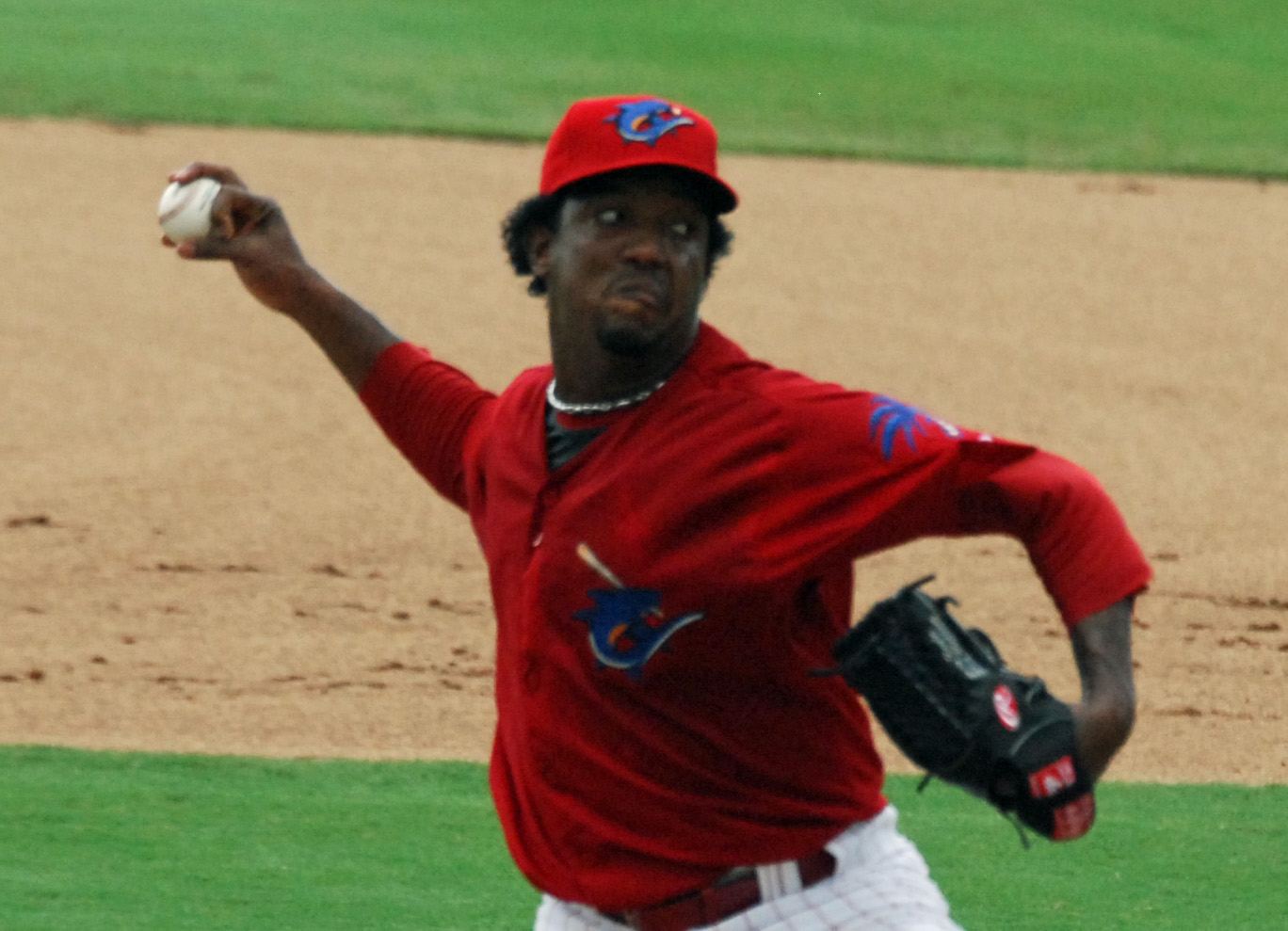
Pedro Martínez won five games against one loss during the 2009 season.

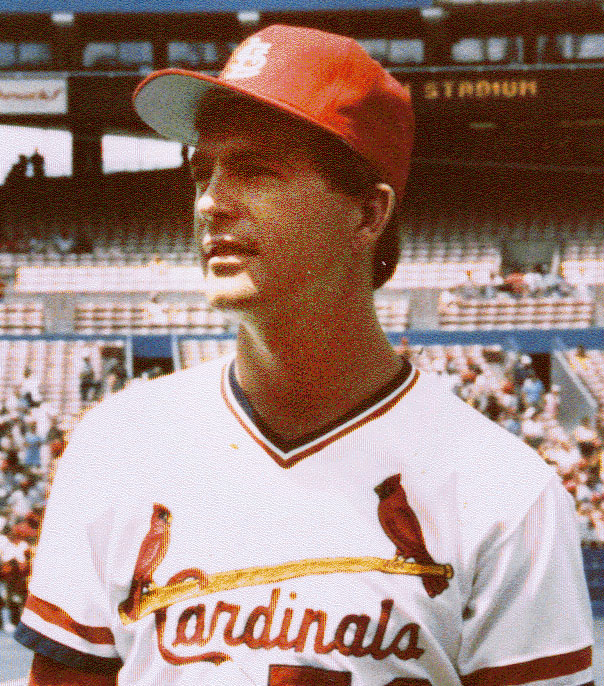
Greg Mathews struck out 27 batters with Philadelphia in 1992.

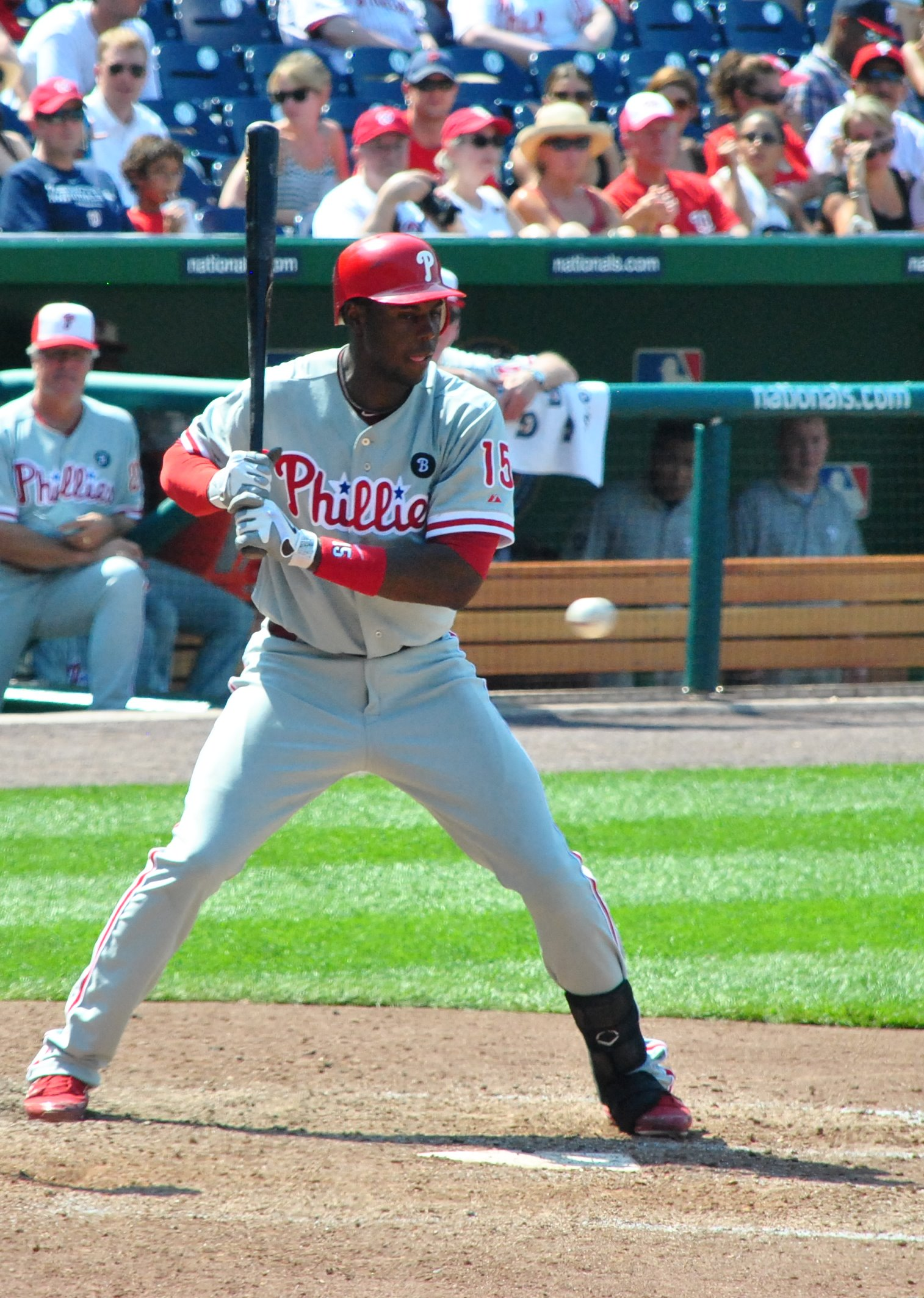
John Mayberry, Jr. has played for the Phillies in parts of the last three seasons.

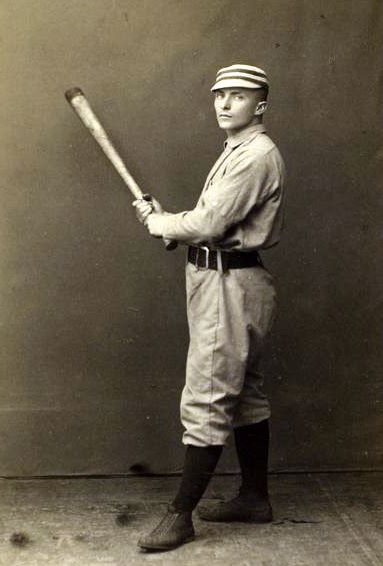
Hall of Famer Tommy McCarthy played for Philadelphia in 1886 and 1887.

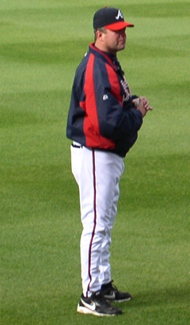
Roger McDowell amassed a 2.90 earned run average in three seasons with the Phillies.

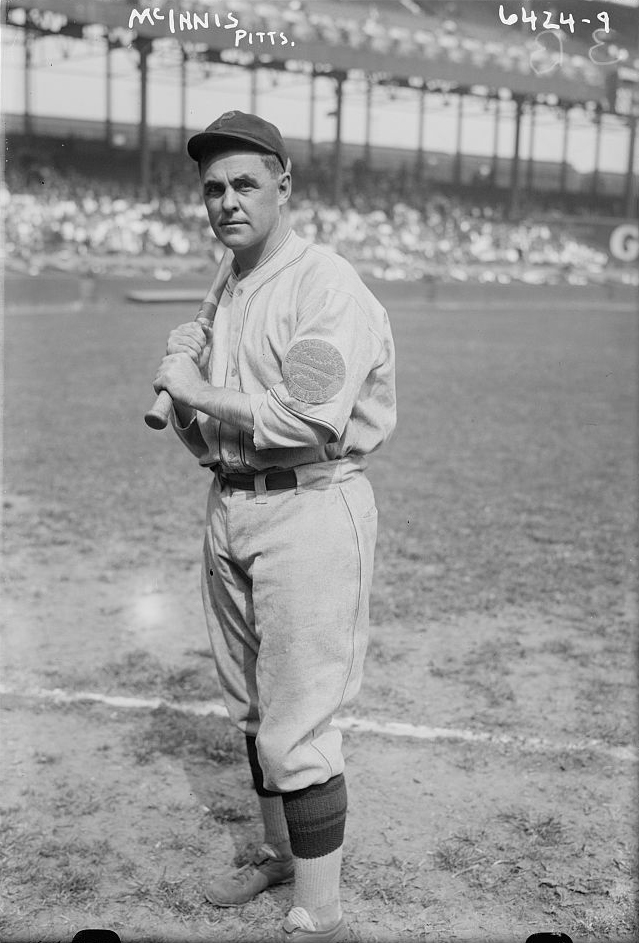
Stuffy McInnis played in one game during the 1927 season.

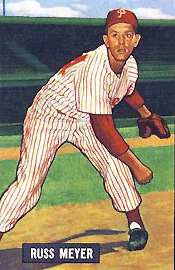
Russ Meyer amassed a 47–42 record in four Philadelphia seasons.

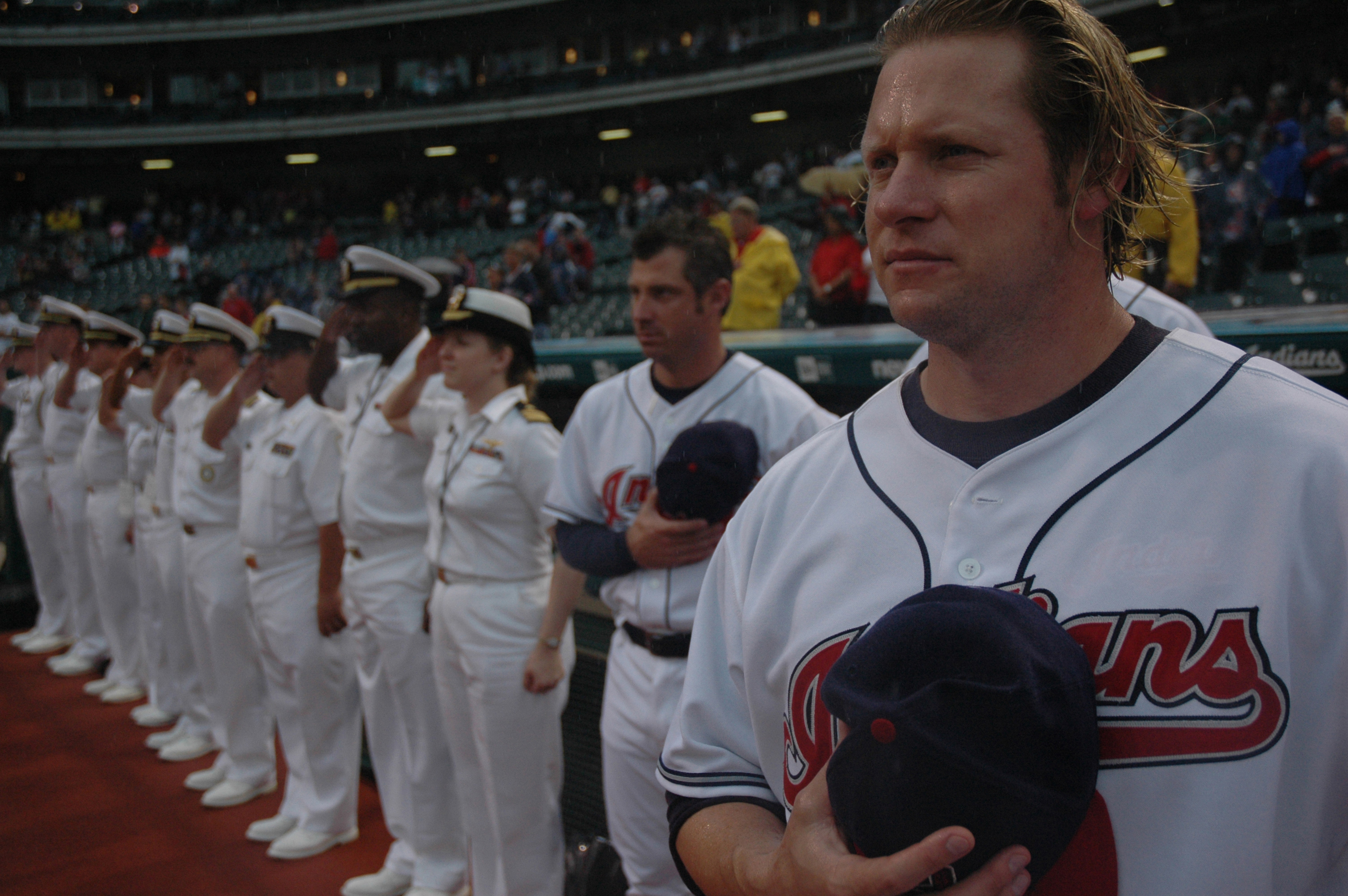
Jason Michaels hit 21 home runs in 5 seasons with the Phillies.

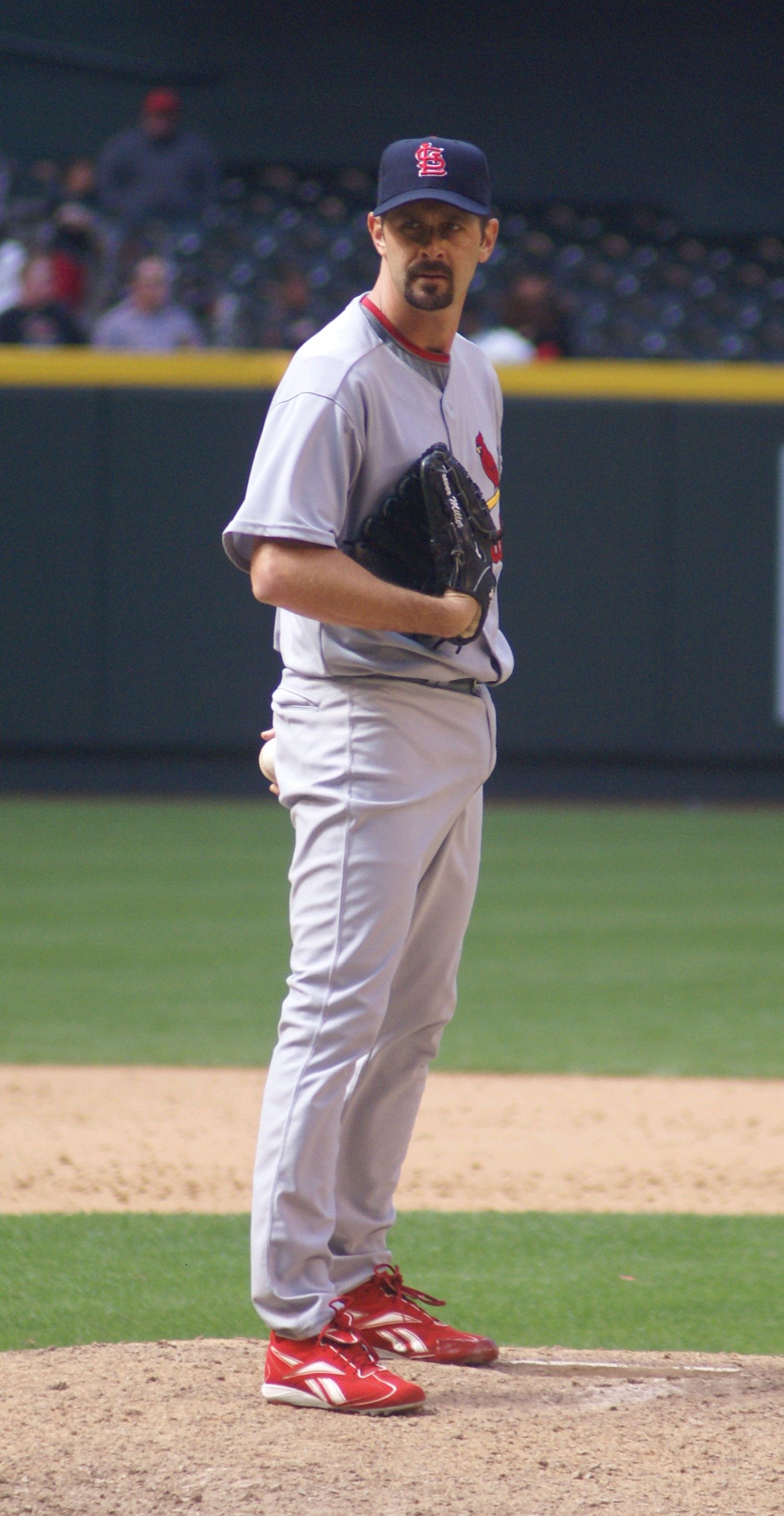
Trever Miller pitched for the Phillies in 2000, striking out ten batters and walking nine.

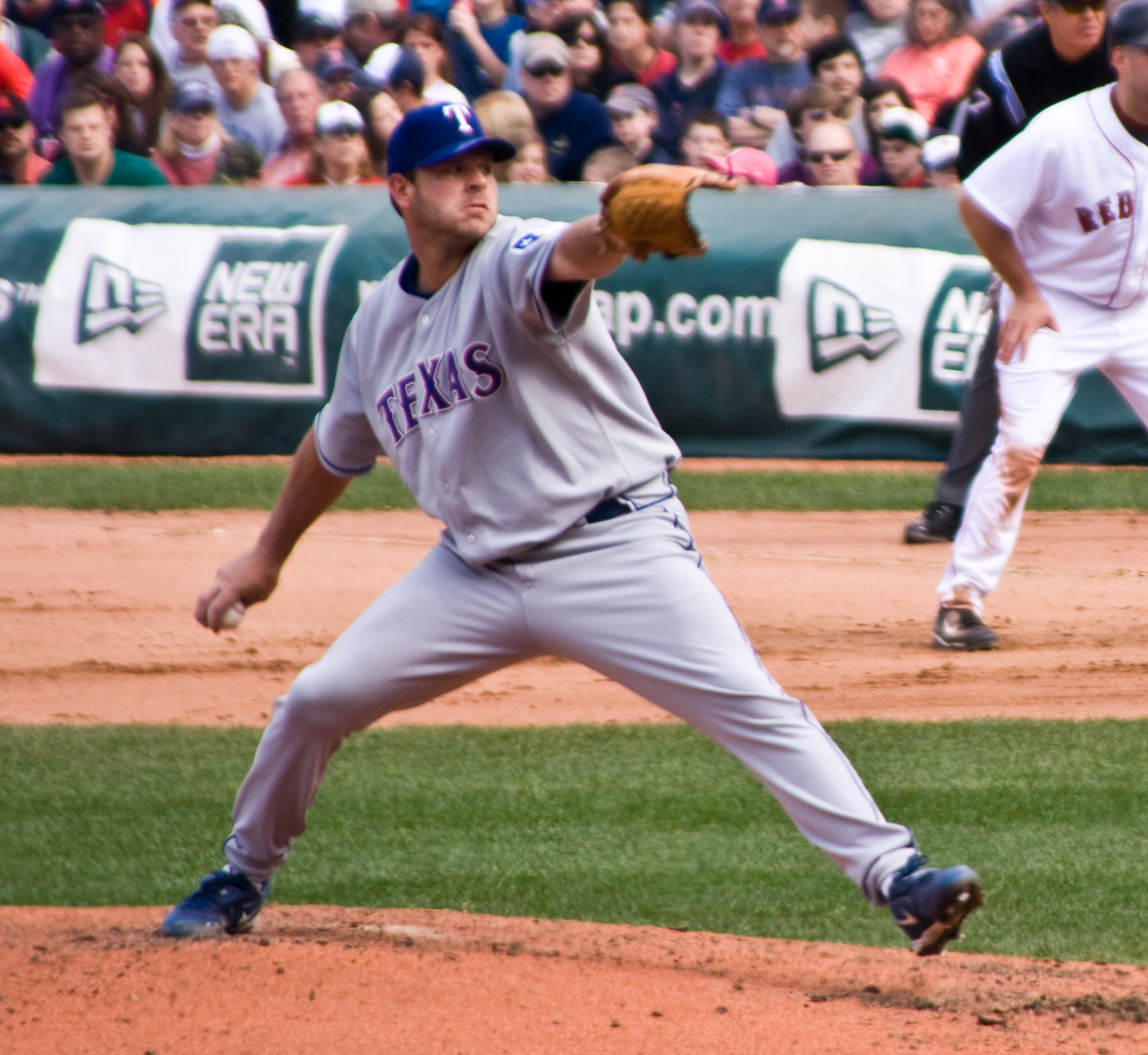
Kevin Millwood threw the ninth no-hitter in Phillies history in 2003.

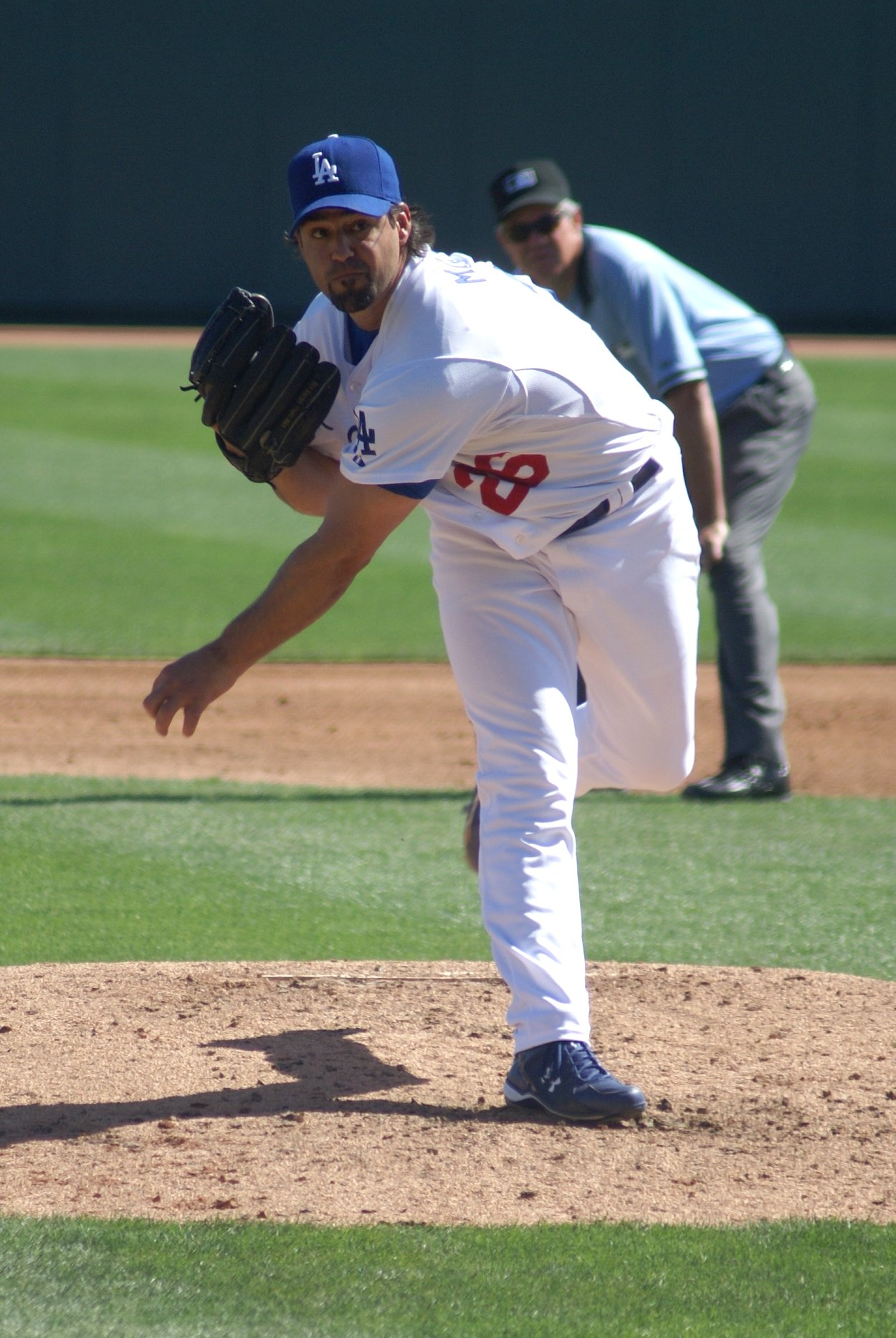
Eric Milton struck out 161 batters in his only Philadelphia season.

Earl Moore collected a 67–64 record with 651 strikeouts in 6 seasons.

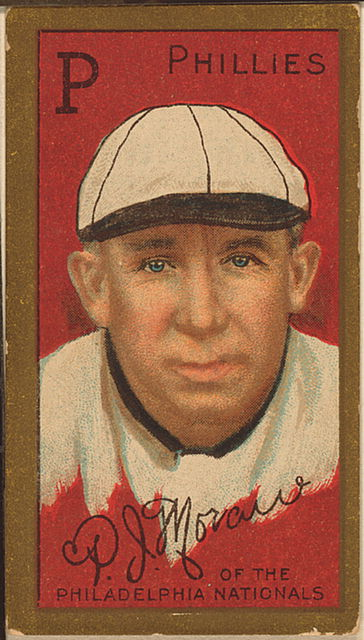
Pat Moran batted in 21 runs in 5 Phillies seasons.

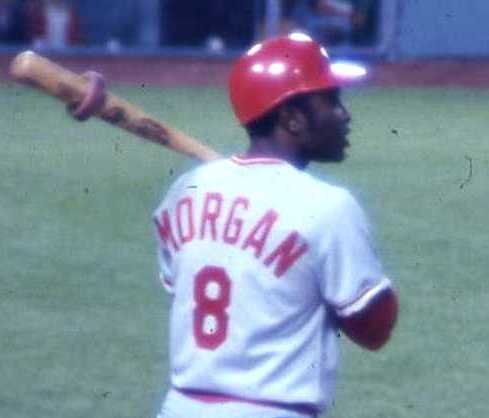
Hall of Famer Joe L. Morgan hit 16 home runs in his only season with Philadelphia.

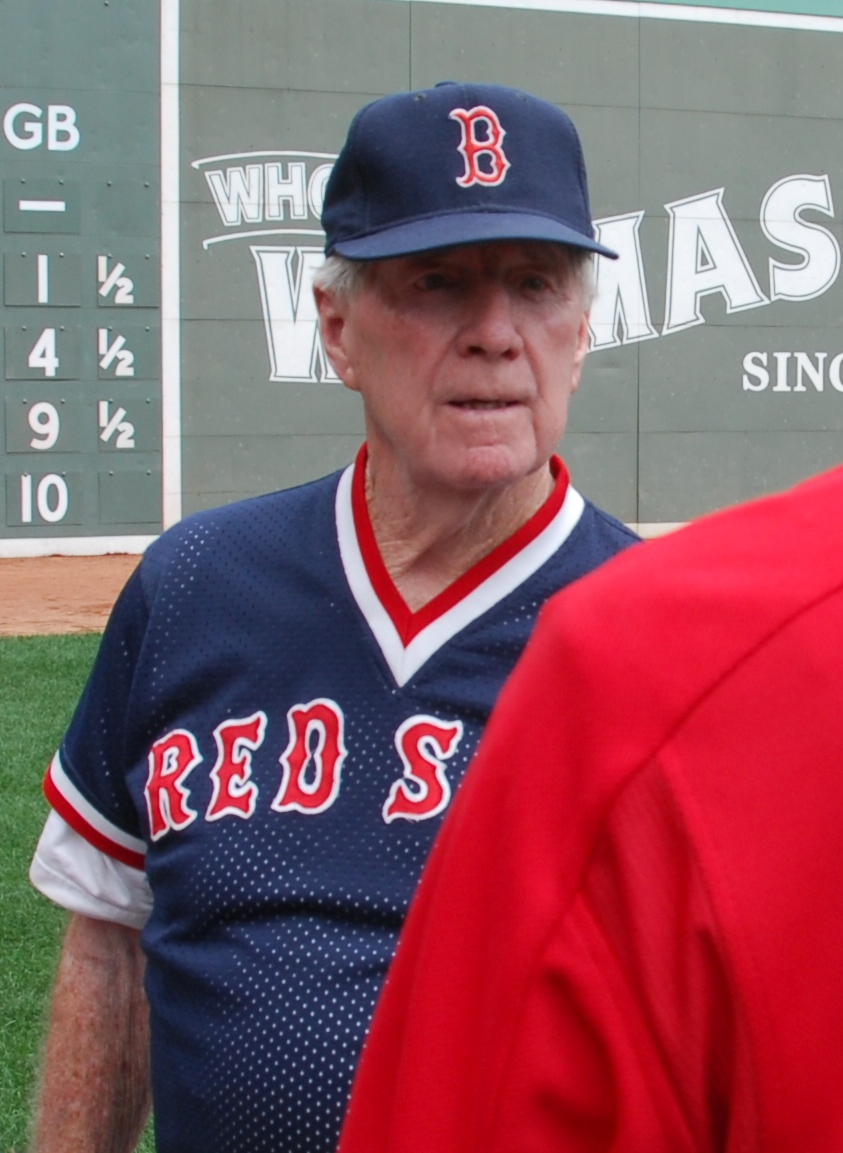
Joe M. Morgan played with the Phillies in the 1960 season.

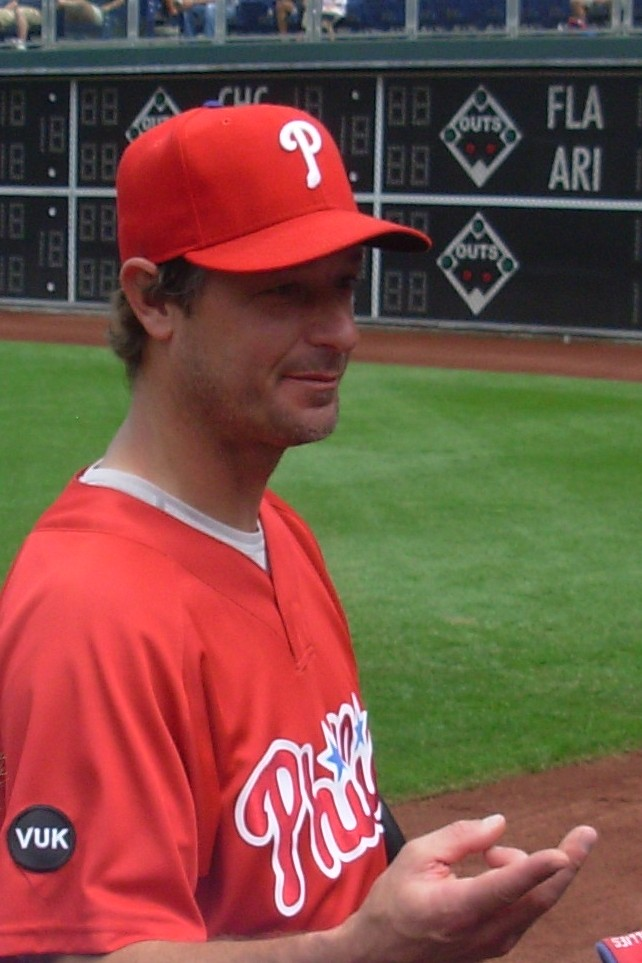
As a Phillie, Jamie Moyer broke the record for most home runs allowed by a pitcher.

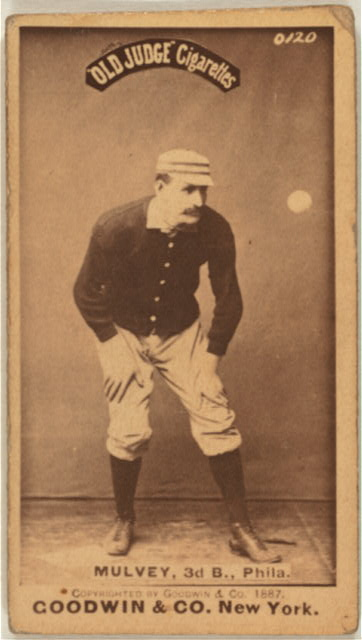
Joe Mulvey had two tenures with the Phillies: a seven-year tour from 1883 to 1889, and a one-year stint in 1892.

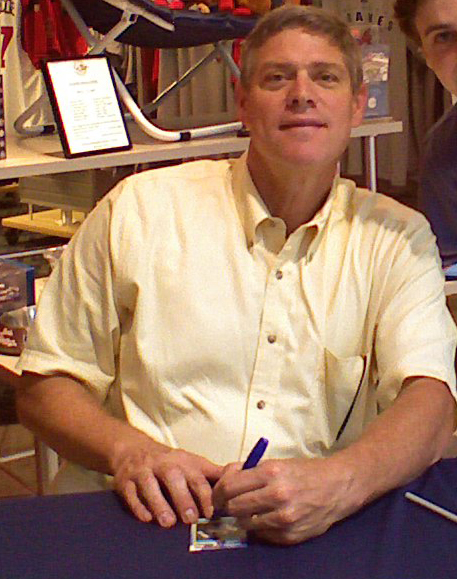
Dale Murphy collected a .249 batting average in three seasons with Philadelphia.

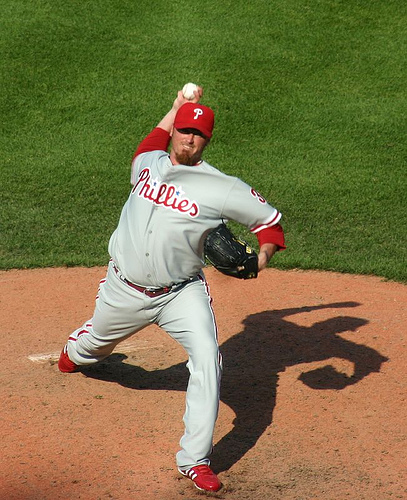
Brett Myers struck out nearly 1,000 batters in eight Phillies seasons.

List of players whose surnames begin with M, showing season(s) and position(s) played and selected statistics
Name	Season(s)	Position(s)	Notes	Ref
John Mabry	2002	First baseman Right fielder	.286 batting average; 3 runs batted in; 1 run scored	
Harvey MacDonald	1928	Right fielder	.250 batting average; 2 runs batted in; 18 plate appearances	
Anderson Machado	2003	Pinch runner^{[a]}	0 plate appearances; 1 stolen base	
Pete Mackanin	1978–1979	Third baseman	.176 batting average; 1 home run; 3 runs batted in	
Bunny Madden	1911	Catcher	.276 batting average; 2 extra-base hits; 4 runs batted in	
Garry Maddox^{§}	1975–1986	Center fielder	.284 batting average; 85 home runs; 566 runs batted in	
Mike Maddux	1986–1989	Pitcher	10–13 record; 4.51 earned run average; 144 strikeouts	
Art Madison	1895	Shortstop	.353 batting average; 3 doubles; 8 runs batted in	
Alex Madrid	1988–1989	Pitcher	2–3 record; 4.39 earned run average; 15 strikeouts	
Ryan Madson	2003–2011	Pitcher	47–30 record; 3.59 earned run average; 547 strikeouts	
Calvin Maduro	1996–1997	Pitcher	3–8 record; 6.57 earned run average; 42 strikeouts	
Bill Magee	1899; 1902	Pitcher	5–9 record; 4.80 earned run average; 19 strikeouts	
Sherry Magee^{§}	1904–1914	Left fielder	.299 batting average; 75 home runs; 886 runs batted in	
Wendell Magee	1996–1999	Center fielder	.228 batting average; 6 home runs; 39 home runs	
Art Mahaffey	1960–1965	Pitcher	58–60 record; 4.09 earned run average; 620 strikeouts	
Art Mahan	1940	First baseman	.244 batting average; 2 home runs; 39 runs batted in	
Frank Mahar	1902	Pinch hitter^{[b]}	.000 batting average; 1 plate appearance	
Billy Maharg	1916	Right fielder	.000 batting average; 1 plate appearance	
Tom Maher	1902	Pinch runner^{[c]}	1 game played; 0 plate appearances	
Alex Main	1918	Pitcher	2–2 record; 4.63 earned run average; 14 strikeouts	
Cy Malis	1934	Pitcher	4.91 earned run average; 1 strikeout; 2 walks	
Bobby Malkmus	1960–1962	Second baseman Shortstop	.225 batting average; 8 home runs; 43 runs batted in	
Les Mallon	1931–1932	Second baseman	.285 batting average; 6 home runs; 76 runs batted in	
Chuck Malone	1990	Pitcher	1–0 record; 3.68 earned run average; 7 strikeouts	
Gus Mancuso	1945	Catcher	.199 batting average; 5 doubles; 16 runs batted in	
George Mangus	1912	Left fielder	.200 batting average; 3 doubles; 3 runs batted in	
Jack Manning	1883–1885	Right fielder	.265 batting average; 129 runs batted in; 192 runs scored	
Jeff Manto	1993	Third baseman	.056 batting average; 18 plate appearances; 1 strikeout	
Harry Marnie	1940–1942	Second baseman	.221 batting average; 6 extra-base hits; 15 runs batted in	
Tom Marsh	1992; 1994–1995	Left fielder	.246 batting average; 5 home runs; 34 runs batted in	
Doc Marshall	1904	Catcher	.100 batting average; 1 run batted in; 1 run scored	
Rube Marshall	1912–1914	Pitcher	6–9 record; 4.24 earned run average; 69 strikeouts	
Lou Marson	2008–2009	Catcher	.286 batting average; 1 home run; 2 runs batted in	
Doc Martel	1909	Catcher	.268 batting average; 4 extra-base hits; 7 runs batted in	
Hersh Martin	1937–1940	Center fielder	.286 batting average; 12 home runs; 115 runs batted in	
Jack Martin	1914	Shortstop	.253 batting average; 8 extra-base hits; 21 runs batted in	
Jerry Martin	1974–1978	Left fielder Right fielder	.254 batting average; 19 home runs; 91 runs batted in	
Renie Martin	1984	Pitcher	0–2 record; 4.60 earned run average; 5 strikeouts	
Carmelo Martínez	1990	First baseman Left fielder	.242 batting average; 8 home runs; 31 runs batted in	
Manny Martínez	1996	Right fielder	.222 batting average; 2 triples; 2 runs scored	
Michael Martínez	2011	Third baseman	.196 batting average; 3 home runs; 24 runs batted in	
Pedro Martínez	2009	Pitcher	5–1 record; 3.63 earned run average; 37 strikeouts	
Ramón Martínez	2005	First baseman	.286 batting average; 1 home run; 9 runs batted in	
Joe Marty	1939–1941	Center fielder	.266 batting average; 30 home runs; 133 runs batted in	
Hank Mason	1958; 1960	Pitcher	10.13 earned run average; 6 strikeouts; 7 walks	
Roger Mason	1993–1994	Pitcher	6–6 record; 4.94 earned run average; 39 strikeouts	
Walt Masters	1937	Pitcher	36.00 earned run average; 4 runs allowed; 1 inning pitched	
Paul Masterson	1940–1942	Pitcher	1–0 record; 5.84 earned run average; 14 strikeouts	
Greg Mathews	1992	Pitcher	2–3 record; 5.16 earned run average; 27 strikeouts	
Scott Mathieson	2006; 2010–2011	Pitcher	1–4 record; 6.75 earned run average; 34 strikeouts	
Eddie Matteson	1914	Pitcher	3–2 record; 3.10 earned run average; 28 strikeouts	
Gary Matthews	1981–1983	Left fielder	.279 batting average; 38 home runs; 200 runs batted in	
Dale Matthewson	1943–1944	Pitcher	0–3 record; 4.34 earned run average; 16 strikeouts	
Len Matuszek	1981–1984	First baseman	.237 batting average; 16 home runs; 63 runs batted in	
Al Maul	1887; 1900	Pitcher; Left fielder	6–5 record; 5.81 earned run average; .282 batting average; 17 runs scored	
Ernie Maun	1926	Pitcher	1–4 record; 6.45 earned run average; 9 strikeouts	
Dick Mauney	1945–1947	Pitcher	12–14 record; 2.99 earned run average; 72 strikeouts	
Tim Mauser	1991; 1993	Pitcher	6.00 earned run average; 20 strikeouts; 10 walks	
Derrick May	1997	Right fielder	.228 batting average; 1 home run; 13 runs batted in	
Pinky May	1939–1943	Third baseman	.275 batting average; 4 home runs; 215 runs batted in	
John Mayberry, Jr.	2009–2011	Left fielder	.265 batting average; 21 home runs; 63 runs batted in	
Ed Mayer	1890–1891	Third baseman	.222 batting average; 101 runs batted in; 73 runs scored	
Erskine Mayer	1912–1918	Pitcher	76–61 record; 2.81 earned run average; 428 strikeouts	
Paddy Mayes	1911	Outfielder	.000 batting average; 1 walk; 1 run scored	
Jackie Mayo	1948–1953	Left fielder Right fielder	.213 batting average; 1 home run; 12 runs batted in	
Mel Mazzera	1940	Left fielder Right fielder	.237 batting average; 9 extra-base hits; 13 runs batted in	
George McAvoy	1914	Pinch hitter^{[d]}	.000 batting average; 1 plate appearance	
Bake McBride	1977–1981	Right fielder	.292 batting average; 44 home runs; 258 runs batted in	
Tommy McCarthy^{†}	1886–1887	Left fielder	.186 batting average; 9 runs batted in; 13 runs scored	
Tim McCarver	1970–1972; 1975–1980	Catcher	.272 batting average; 26 home runs; 168 runs batted in	
Al McCauley	1890	First baseman	.244 batting average; 42 runs batted in; 63 runs scored	
Bill McClellan	1883–1884	Shortstop	.246 batting average; 66 runs batted in; 113 runs scored	
John McCloskey	1906–1907	Pitcher	3–2 record; 3.60 earned run average; 9 strikeouts	
Don McCormack	1980–1981	Catcher	.400 batting average; 2 hits; 5 plate appearances	
Frank McCormick	1946–1947	First baseman	.279 batting average; 12 home runs; 74 runs batted in	
Moose McCormick	1908	Left fielder	.091 batting average; 2 hits; 2 runs batted in	
Harry McCurdy	1930–1933	Catcher	.285 batting average; 5 home runs; 76 runs batted in	
Ed McDonough	1909–1910	Catcher	.100 batting average; 1 run scored; 10 plate appearances	
Roger McDowell	1989–1991	Pitcher	12–17 record; 2.90 earned run average; 99 strikeouts	
Chuck McElroy	1989–1990	Pitcher	0–1 record; 5.18 earned run average; 24 strikeouts	
Jim McElroy	1884	Pitcher	1–12 record; 4.86 earned run average; 45 strikeouts	
Barney McFadden	1902	Pitcher	0–1 record; 8.00 earned run average; 3 strikeouts	
Ed McFarland	1897–1901	Catcher	.294 batting average; 214 runs batted in; 225 runs scored	
Jack McFetridge	1890; 1903	Pitcher	2–11 record; 4.58 earned run average; 35 strikeouts	
Patsy McGaffigan	1917–1918	Second baseman	.194 batting average; 1 home run; 14 runs batted in	
Willie McGill	1895–1896	Pitcher	15–12 record; 5.46 earned run average; 99 strikeouts	
Gus McGinnis	1893	Pitcher	1–3 record; 4.34 earned run average; 12 strikeouts	
Bob McGraw	1928–1929	Pitcher	12–13 record; 5.41 earned run average; 50 strikeouts	
Tug McGraw^{§}	1975–1984	Pitcher	49–37 record; 3.10 earned run average; 491 strikeouts; 94 saves	
Deacon McGuire	1886–1888	Catcher	.261 batting average; 4 home runs; 52 runs batted in	
Stuffy McInnis	1927	First baseman	1 game played; 0 plate appearances	
Roger McKee	1943–1944	Pitcher	1–0 record; 5.87 earned run average; 1 strikeout	
Barney McLaughlin	1887	Second baseman	.220 batting average; 1 home run; 26 runs batted in	
Warren McLaughlin	1900; 1903	Pitcher	0–3 record; 6.52 earned run average; 4 strikeouts	
Jim McLeod	1933	Third baseman	.194 batting average; 7 extra-base hits; 15 runs batted in	
Cal McLish	1962–1964	Pitcher	24–17 record; 3.68 earned run average; 175 strikeouts	
Billy McMillon	1997	Left fielder	.292 batting average; 2 home runs; 13 runs batted in	
John McPherson	1904	Pitcher	1–12 record; 3.66 earned run average; 32 strikeouts	
George McQuillan	1907–1910; 1915–1916	Pitcher	54–49 record; 1.79 earned run average*; 344 strikeouts	
Larry McWilliams	1989	Pitcher	2–11 record; 4.10 earned run average; 54 strikeouts	
Lee Meadows	1919–1923	Pitcher	48–61 record; 3.65 earned run average; 307 strikeouts	
Louie Meadows	1990	Left fielder Center fielder	.071 batting average; 1 hit; 15 plate appearances	
Francisco Meléndez	1984; 1986	First baseman	.161 batting average; 2 runs batted in; 32 plate appearances	
Rube Melton	1941–1942	Pitcher	10–25 record; 3.99 earned run average; 164 strikeouts	
Rudy Meoli	1979	Shortstop; Second baseman	.178 batting average; 6 runs batted in; 2 runs scored	
Héctor Mercado	2002–2003	Pitcher	2–2 record; 4.99 earned run average; 55 strikeouts	
Whit Merrifield	2024	Left fielder Second baseman	.199 batting average; 11 runs batted in; 21 runs scored	
Sam Mertes	1896	Center fielder	.238 batting average; 14 runs batted in; 20 runs scored	
José Mesa	2001–2003; 2007	Pitcher	13–18 record; 4.05 earned run average; 188 strikeouts; 112 saves*	
Lenny Metz	1923–1925	Shortstop	.172 batting average; 4 runs batted in; 6 runs scored	
Irish Meusel	1918–1921	Left fielder Right fielder	.308 batting average; 35 home runs; 241 runs batted in	
Benny Meyer	1925	Second baseman	1.000 batting average; 1 hit; 1 run scored	
Jack Meyer	1955–1961	Pitcher	24–34 record; 3.29 earned run average; 375 strikeouts	
Russ Meyer	1949–1952	Pitcher	47–42 record; 3.64 earned run average; 309 strikeouts	
Mickey Micelotta	1954–1955	Shortstop	.000 batting average; 2 runs scored; 9 plate appearances	
Jason Michaels	2001–2005	Center fielder Left fielder	.291 batting average; 21 home runs; 100 runs batted in	
Larry Milbourne	1983	Second baseman	.242 batting average; 1 triple; 4 runs batted in	
Bob Miller	1949–1958	Pitcher	42–42 record; 3.96 earned run average; 263 strikeouts	
Cyclone Miller	1884	Pitcher	0–1 record; 10.00 earned run average; 1 strikeout	
Doc Miller	1912–1913	Right fielder	.307 batting average; 23 extra-base hits; 32 runs batted in	
Dots Miller	1920–1921	Second baseman Third baseman	.275 batting average; 1 home run; 50 runs batted in	
Eddie Miller	1948–1949	Shortstop; Second baseman	.232 batting average; 20 home runs; 90 runs batted in	
Elmer Miller	1929	Pitcher; Right fielder	0–1 record; 11.12 earned run average; .237 batting average; 1 home run	
Hughie Miller	1911	Pinch runner^{[e]}	1 game played; 0 plate appearances	
Keith Miller	1988–1989	Third baseman Center fielder	.190 batting average; 4 doubles; 6 runs batted in	
Kohly Miller	1897	Second baseman	.182 batting average; 1 run batted in; 2 runs scored	
Ralph Miller	1920–1921	Third baseman Shortstop	.251 batting average; 3 home runs; 54 runs batted in	
Red Miller	1923	Pitcher	32.40 earned run average; 1 walk; 6 runs allowed	
Russ Miller	1927–1928	Pitcher	1–13 record; 5.40 earned run average; 23 strikeouts	
Stu Miller	1956	Pitcher	5–8 record; 4.47 earned run average; 55 strikeouts	
Trever Miller	2000	Pitcher	8.36 earned run average; 10 strikeouts; 9 walks	
Joe Millette	1992–1993	Shortstop	.205 batting average; 4 runs batted in; 8 runs scored	
Wally Millies	1939–1941	Catcher	.204 batting average; 12 runs batted in; 13 runs scored	
John Milligan	1928–1931	Pitcher	3–8 record; 5.05 earned run average; 37 strikeouts	
Kevin Millwood	2003–2004	Pitcher	23–18 record; 4.34 earned run average; 294 strikeouts	
Al Milnar	1946	Pitcher	Infinite earned run average; 4 runs allowed; 0 innings pitched	
Eric Milton	2004	Pitcher	14–6 record; 4.75 earned run average; 161 strikeouts	
Mike Mimbs	1995–1997	Pitcher	12–19 record; 5.03 earned run average; 178 strikeouts	
Clarence Mitchell	1923–1928	Pitcher	40–57 record; 4.98 earned run average; 192 strikeouts	
Fred Mitchell	1903–1904	Pitcher	15–23 record; 4.13 earned run average; 98 strikeouts	
Larry Mitchell	1996	Pitcher	4.50 earned run average; 7 strikeouts; 5 walks	
Johnny Mokan	1922–1927	Left fielder	.293 batting average; 32 home runs; 256 runs batted in	
Bob Molinaro	1982–1983	Pinch hitter^{[f]}	.188 batting average; 1 home run; 5 runs batted in	
Fred Mollenkamp	1914	First baseman	.125 batting average; 1 hit; 11 plate appearances	
Alex Monchak	1940	Shortstop	.143 batting average; 2 hits; 1 run scored	
Don Money	1968–1972	Third baseman	.241 batting average; 42 home runs; 200 runs batted in	
Sid Monge	1982–1983	Pitcher	10–1 record; 4.20 earned run average; 50 strikeouts	
John Monroe	1921	Second baseman	.286 batting average; 1 home run; 8 runs batted in	
John Montague	1975	Pitcher	9.00 earned run average; 1 strikeout; 4 walks	
Willie Montañez	1970–1975; 1982	First baseman Center fielder	.266 batting average; 63 home runs; 327 runs batted in	
René Monteagudo	1945	Right fielder	.301 batting average; 6 doubles; 15 runs batted in	
Steve Montgomery	1999	Pitcher	1–5 record; 3.34 earned run average; 55 strikeouts	
Brad Moore	1988; 1990	Pitcher	1.08 earned run average; 3 strikeouts; 6 walks	
Cy Moore	1933–1934	Pitcher	12–18 record; 4.94 earned run average; 108 strikeouts	
Dee Moore	1943; 1946	Catcher	.222 batting average; 1 home run; 9 runs batted in	
Earl Moore	1908–1913	Pitcher	67–64 record; 2.63 earned run average; 651 strikeouts	
Euel Moore	1934–1935; 1936	Pitcher	8–16 record; 5.47 earned run average; 72 strikeouts	
Johnny Moore	1934–1937	Right fielder	.329 batting average; 55 home runs; 313 runs batted in	
Pat Moran	1910–1914	Catcher	.210 batting average; 12 extra-base hits; 21 runs batted in	
Mickey Morandini	1990–1997; 2000	Second baseman	.267 batting average; 20 home runs; 254 runs batted in	
Seth Morehead	1957–1959	Pitcher	2–9 record; 5.31 earned run average; 98 strikeouts	
Keith Moreland	1978–1981	Catcher	.291 batting average; 10 home runs; 74 runs batted in	
Harry Morelock	1891–1892	Shortstop	.059 batting average; 1 hit; 1 run scored	
Lew Moren	1907–1910	Pitcher	48–56 record; 2.88 earned run average; 354 strikeouts	
Bobby Morgan	1954–1956; 1957	Shortstop; Second baseman	.245 batting average; 24 home runs; 100 runs batted in	
Joe L. Morgan^{†}	1983	Second baseman	.230 batting average; 16 home runs; 59 runs batted in	
Joe M. Morgan	1960	Third baseman	.133 batting average; 4 extra-base hits; 2 runs batted in	
Jim Moroney	1910	Pitcher	1–2 record; 2.14 earned run average; 13 strikeouts	
John D. Morris	1991	Center fielder Right fielder	.220 batting average; 1 home run; 6 runs batted in	
John W. Morris	1966	Pitcher	1–1 record; 5.27 earned run average; 8 strikeouts	
Jim Morrison	1977–1978	Second baseman	.174 batting average; 3 home runs; 11 runs batted in	
Sparrow Morton	1884	Pitcher	0–2 record; 5.29 earned run average; 5 strikeouts	
Walter Moser	1906	Pitcher	0–4 record; 3.59 earned run average; 17 strikeouts	
Brandon Moss	2011	Right fielder	.000 batting average; 2 strikeouts; 6 plate appearances	
Bitsy Mott	1945	Shortstop	.221 batting average; 22 runs batted in; 21 runs scored	
Frank Motz	1890	First baseman	.000 batting average; 1 run scored; 3 plate appearances	
Jamie Moyer	2006–2010	Pitcher	56–40 record; 4.55 earned run average; 439 strikeouts	
Ron Mrozinski	1954–1955	Pitcher	1–3 record; 5.36 earned run average; 44 strikeouts	
Heinie Mueller	1938–1941	Second baseman	.253 batting average; 17 home runs; 127 runs batted in	
Hugh Mulcahy	1935–1940; 1945–1946	Pitcher	45–89 record; 4.49 earned run average; 312 strikeouts	
Terry Mulholland	1989–1993; 1996	Pitcher	62–57 record; 3.81 earned run average; 570 strikeouts	
Moon Mullen	1944	Second baseman	.267 batting average; 31 runs batted in; 51 runs scored	
Dick Mulligan	1946	Pitcher	2–2 record; 4.77 earned run average; 16 strikeouts	
Joe Mulvey	1883–1889; 1892	Third baseman	.259 batting average; 18 home runs; 350 runs batted in	
Manny Muñiz	1971	Pitcher	0–1 record; 6.97 earned run average; 6 strikeouts	
Scott Munninghoff	1980	Pitcher	4.50 earned run average; 2 strikeouts; 5 walks	
Bobby Muñoz	1994–1997	Pitcher	8–15 record; 4.84 earned run average; 93 strikeouts	
Red Munson	1905	Catcher	.115 batting average; 1 double; 2 runs batted in	
Con Murphy	1884	Pitcher	0–3 record; 6.58 earned run average; 10 strikeouts	
Dale Murphy	1990–1992	Right fielder	.249 batting average; 27 home runs; 116 runs batted in	
Herbert Murphy	1914	Shortstop	.154 batting average; 5 extra-base hits; 1 run scored	
Dwayne Murphy	1989	Left fielder Right fielder	.218 batting average; 9 home runs; 27 runs batted in	
Edward J. Murphy	1898	Pitcher	1–2 record; 5.10 earned run average; 8 strikeouts	
Edward Joseph Murphy	1942	First baseman	.250 batting average; 2 doubles; 4 runs batted in	
Morgan Murphy	1898; 1900	Catcher	.221 batting average; 14 runs batted in; 8 runs scored	
Glenn Murray	1996	Right fielder	.196 batting average; 2 home runs; 6 runs batted in	
Pat Murray	1919	Pitcher	0–2 record; 6.29 earned run average; 11 strikeouts	
Tom Murray	1894	Shortstop	.000 batting average; 2 plate appearances; 2 strikeouts	
Danny Murtaugh	1941–1943; 1946	Second baseman	.246 batting average; 2 home runs; 76 runs batted in	
Barney Mussill	1944	Pitcher	0–1 record; 6.05 earned run average; 5 strikeouts	
Al Myers	1885; 1889–1891	Second baseman	.245 batting average; 206 runs batted in; 239 runs scored	
Bert Myers	1900	Third baseman	.179 batting average; 2 runs batted in; 5 runs scored	
Brett Myers	2002–2009	Pitcher	73–63 record; 4.40 earned run average; 986 strikeouts	

== Footnotes ==
Key

- ^{H} The National Baseball Hall of Fame and Museum determines which cap a player wears on their plaque, signifying "the team with which he made his most indelible mark". The Hall of Fame considers the player's wishes in making their decision, but the Hall makes the final decision as "it is important that the logo be emblematic of the historical accomplishments of that player’s career".
- ^{P} Players are listed at a position if they appeared in 30% of their games or more during their Phillies career, as defined by Baseball-Reference. Additional positions may be shown on the Baseball-Reference website by following each player's citation.
- ^{R} Franchise batting and pitching leaders are drawn from Baseball-Reference. A total of 1,500 plate appearances are needed to qualify for batting records, and 500 innings pitched or 50 decisions are required to qualify for pitching records.
- ^{S} Statistics are correct as of the end of the 2010 Major League Baseball season.

Table

- ^{a} Anderson Machado is listed by Baseball-Reference as a shortstop, but never appeared in a game in the field for the Phillies.
- ^{b} Frank Mahar is listed by Baseball-Reference without a position; he appeared in one career game on August 29, 1902.
- ^{c} Tom Maher is listed by Baseball-Reference without a position; he appeared in one career game in April 1902 without making a plate appearance.
- ^{d} George McAvoy is listed by Baseball-Reference without a position; he appeared in one career game on July 17, 1914.
- ^{e} Hughie Miller is listed by Baseball-Reference as a first baseman, but never appeared in a game in the field for the Phillies.
- ^{f} Bob Molinaro is listed by Baseball-Reference as an outfielder, but never appeared in a game in the field for the Phillies.
