= Jim McElroy (baseball) =

American baseball player (1862–1889)

- Pitcher
- Born: November 5, 1862; Napa County, California, U.S.
- Died: February 24, 1889 (aged 26); Needles, California, U.S.
- Batted: Unknown Threw: Unknown

MLB debut
- May 26, 1884, for the Philadelphia Quakers

Last MLB appearance
- August 21, 1884, for the Wilmington Quicksteps

MLB statistics
- Games pitched: 14
- Win–loss record: 1–13
- Earned run average: 5.12
- Stats at Baseball Reference

Teams
- Philadelphia Quakers (1884); Wilmington Quicksteps (1884)

James D. McElroy (November 5, 1862 – February 24, 1889) was an American professional baseball player who played one season at the major league level. He pitched thirteen games for the 1884 Philadelphia Quakers, and one game for the Wilmington Quicksteps. His W–L record was 1–13, and he had an earned run average of 5.12. He attended Saint Mary's College of California in Moraga, California.

He was first seen on May 2, 1884, pitching for the Baltimore Monumentals of the Eastern League, when he pitched against the Quicksteps. Before the 1884 season, Harry Wright took over as the Phillies manager, and was a fan of McElroy's talent. In McElroy's 14 starts, there were seven different catchers who caught him, four of whom claimed that he was the first pitcher they had ever caught at the major league level. These included Joe Kappel, who was charged with 7 passed balls in his Major League debut on May 26, Gene Vadeboncoeur in his Major League debut on July 11, Bill Conway, who had 5 [assed balls in his Major League debut on July 28, Mike DePangher in his Major League debut on August 8. In an era when catcher's equipment was still very meager, and with no other catchers willing to work with McElroy, Wright was therefore forced to release him. He ended the season with 46 wild pitches in 111 innings pitched. His only win against 12 losses came against the Providence Grays on July 22, when the Grays were left with only 8 players when their pitcher Charlie Sweeney walked off the field rather than switch places with right fielder Cyclone Miller and the Quakers ended up winning 10-6.

McElroy became addicted to drugs and alcohol, and died at an opium den in Needles, California after being injected with morphine by an unknown person while he was unconscious or in stupor.
