= Underwood Cochran =

American politicians from New Jersey (1852–1924)

Member of the New Jersey General Assembly from Atlantic County
- In office 1918 – December 31, 1919 Serving with William A. Blair
- Preceded by: Bertram E. Whitman; Irving P. Parsons
- Succeeded by: Joseph A. Corio

Personal details
- Born: September 21, 1872 Camilla, Georgia
- Died: December 31, 1919 (aged 47) Atlantic City, New Jersey
- Party: Republican
- Spouse(s): Bye Butler; Stella Fralinger

Underwood Cochran (September 21, 1872 – December 31, 1919) was an American physician, real estate businessman and Republican Party politician who represented Atlantic County, New Jersey in the New Jersey General Assembly.

== Early life and education ==
Underwood Cochran was born on September 21, 1872, in Camilla, Georgia, to Robert Henry and Emma (née Haile) Cochran. He was educated in the Camilla public schools and graduated with honors from medical school in Atlanta or Louisville (sources vary) in 1892.

== Medical and business career ==
He practiced medicine in Camilla, Savannah, and New York City before permanently settling in Atlantic City, New Jersey around 1900. In Atlantic City, he worked at Joseph Fralinger's drugstore, where Fralinger pioneered the sale of salt water taffy.

After marrying Fralinger's daughter in 1904, he was entrusted with the management of Fralinger's various business interests in the city, including ownership of the Atlantic City Sales Company and Apollo Theatre. He was also an executive of Globe Printing Company, Wheeler Coal Company, Cochran Moore Improvement Company, and the Atlantic City Publicity Bureau.

== Political career ==
Cochran was a member of the Republican Party.

In 1915, Cochran chaired a campaign to repeal Atlantic City's blue laws. The campaign was supported by Atlantic City mayor William Riddle and many wealthy hoteliers in the city, who sought to increase their revenue on Sundays. In May 1916, he ran on Riddle's ticket for the City Commission in an election described in The New York Times as one of the most interesting in the city's history. The Riddle ticket was defeated by a conservative Citizens' ticket led by Harry Bacharach and supported by Bacharach's brother, U.S. representative Isaac Bacharach, and political boss Louis Kuehnle. On election day, the bail bonds for four leading Riddle supporters who had been indicted for gambling were surrendered by their surety companies, forcing the men to go to Mays Landing for new bonds and leave the polls for several hours. Twenty-two others were arrested at the polls.

Cochran was elected to the New Jersey General Assembly in 1917 and re-elected in 1918, serving in the 142nd and 143rd assemblies. During his first term, he chaired the Committee on Treasurers' Accounts and also served on the committees on Railroads and on Election Incidental Expenses.

In his brief second term, he served on a bipartisan committee to resolve the deadlock over the speaker of the Assembly election in 1919 and chaired the Committee on Railroads and Canals. He was also a member of the committees on Commerce and Navigation, Riparian Rights, and the Sinking Fund.

At the time of his death in 1919, Cochran was also serving as a member of the Atlantic City Commission. In August 1919, he sought to organize New Jersey mayors to demand congressional action on food shortages, including by purchasing army surplus.

== Personal life and death ==
In Georgia, Cochran was married to Bye Butler, who died one year after their marriage. They had a daughter, Jennie Bye, who was adopted by Mrs. F. L. Mallary of Macon, Georgia. She married Frank Rogers and died about a year before her father's death.

Cochran remarried Joseph Fralinger's daughter, Stella Marie Fralinger, on November 23, 1904, in Atlantic City. In Atlantic City, Cochran was a member of the Sea View Golf Club, the Rotary Club, the Atlantic City Yacht Club, the Century Club, and the Old Colony Club. He was also a member of the Pen and Pencil Club of Philadelphia, the Morris Guards and Atlantic City Turn Verein, the Knights of Pythias, the Elks, the Eagles, the Improved Order of Red Men, and the Loyal Order of Moose.

Cochran died on December 31, 1919, from an acute case of Bright's disease.
