= Farmer Steelman =

American baseball player (1875–1944)

- Catcher
- Born: June 29, 1875; Millville, New Jersey, U.S.
- Died: September 16, 1944 (aged 69); Merchantville, New Jersey, U.S.
- Batted: Unknown Threw: Right

MLB debut
- September 15, 1899, for the Louisville Colonels

Last MLB appearance
- May 22, 1902, for the Philadelphia Athletics

MLB statistics
- Batting average: .218
- Home runs: 0
- Runs batted in: 15
- Stats at Baseball Reference

Teams
- Louisville Colonels (1899); Brooklyn Superbas (1900–1901); Philadelphia Athletics (1901–1902)

Morris James "Farmer" Steelman (June 29, 1875 – September 16, 1944) was an American catcher in Major League Baseball. He played for the Louisville Colonels, Brooklyn Superbas, and Philadelphia Athletics from 1899 to 1902.

== Career ==
Steelman was born in Millville, New Jersey. He started his professional baseball career in 1895 with his hometown team, which played in the South New Jersey League. The following season, he moved to York of the Pennsylvania State League and batted .277 in 12 games. Steelman then played in the Atlantic League in 1897. In 1898, he started the season in the Southern League, but when that circuit folded, he returned north to Norfolk.

For the next few seasons, Steelman split time between the Eastern League and the majors. He hit well for the Syracuse Stars in 1899 and made his MLB debut in September with the Louisville Colonels. Steelman went just 1 for 15 at Louisville. In January 1900, he was purchased by the Brooklyn Superbas. He apparently sat on the bench all season, appearing in just one game that October. He was the only rookie to play for Brooklyn in 1900.

Steelman was released by the Superbas in May 1901. He joined the Eastern League's Hartford Indians and batted .292 for them in 90 games. In August, he jumped to the Philadelphia Athletics of the new American League and batted .261 there. Steelman started off slow in 1902 and returned to the minors. He played his last Major League game on May 22.

From 1902 to 1909, Steelman never batted above .244. He played in the Pacific Coast League for one year, 1904, and led the league's catchers in errors. Steelman then went back east for 1905 and had stints in the Eastern League, New York State League, and Tri-State League. After batting .167 in 1909, he retired from organized baseball.

In his 14-year career, Steelman never batted .300 over the course of a season. He had a career .218 batting average in the majors, with 0 home runs; he also had a career .228 batting average in the minors, with exactly 4 home runs in 899 games.

Steelman moved to Merchantville, New Jersey, around 1939, and died there at the age of 69.
