= Harry Miller (baseball) =

American baseball player (1860-1919)

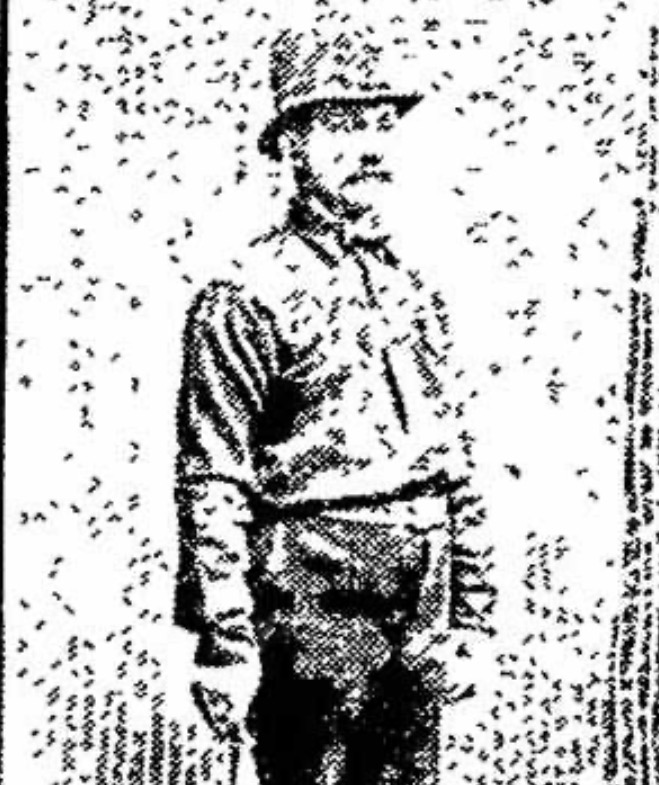
- Miller working as a police officer
- Pitcher
- Born: July 30, 1860; Camden, New Jersey
- Died: May 25, 1919 (aged 58); Camden, New Jersey
- Batted: Unknown Threw: Unknown

MLB debut
- October 9, 1884, for the Philadelphia Quakers

Last appearance
- October 9, 1884, Philadelphia Quakers

Career statistics
- Games: 1
- ERA: 10.00
- Stats at Baseball Reference

Teams
- Philadelphia Quakers (1884)

John Henry "Harry" Miller (July 30, 1860 – May 25, 1919) was an American professional baseball player who pitched in one game for the 1884 Philadelphia Quakers.

== Career ==
Miller made his only major-league appearance on October 9, 1884, when he pitched for the Philadelphia Quakers of the National League. He pitched a complete game but allowed 19 runs, 10 of them earned, on 17 hits and six walks while recording one strikeout.

For many years, Miller's appearance was incorrectly credited to Joe “Cyclone” Miller, who pitched for two other clubs during the 1884 season. The error was identified in 2026 after a researcher examined contemporary newspaper accounts of the Philadelphia game. Miller's obituary also stated that he had once pitched in the National League, providing additional evidence for his identification.

After his baseball career, Miller worked as a police officer. He was a longtime friend of Kid Gleason, and the two remained close throughout their lives.
