= Doc Potts =

American baseball player (1869–1934)

- Catcher
- Born: January 1869; Bristol, Pennsylvania, U.S.
- Died: August 18, 1934 (aged 65); Bristol, Pennsylvania, U.S.
- Batted: Unknown Threw: Unknown

MLB debut
- October 3, 1892, for the Washington Senators

Last MLB appearance
- October 3, 1892, for the Washington Senators

MLB statistics
- At bats: 4
- Hits: 1
- Batting average: .250
- Stats at Baseball Reference

Teams
- Washington Senators (1892)

Vivian Potts [Doc] (January 1869 – August 18, 1934) was an American professional baseball player. He played in Major League Baseball (MLB) as a catcher for one game with the Washington Senators of the National League on October 3, 1892. He later played in the Pennsylvania State League from 1892–1894; the Southern Association and the South New Jersey League in 1895, and the New England League in 1896. Sometimes he is credited as Dan Potts.
