= Bill Conway (baseball) =

American baseball player (1861–1943)

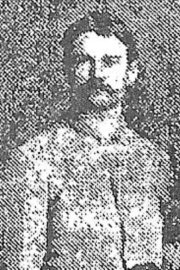
- Catcher
- Born: November 28, 1861; Lowell, Massachusetts, U.S.
- Died: December 18, 1943 (aged 82); Somerville, Massachusetts, U.S.
- Batted: Right Threw: Right

MLB debut
- July 28, 1884, for the Philadelphia Quakers

Last MLB appearance
- August 29, 1886, for the Baltimore Orioles

MLB statistics
- Games played: 8
- At bats: 18
- Hits: 2
- Stats at Baseball Reference

Teams
- Philadelphia Quakers (1884); Baltimore Orioles (1886)

William F. Conway (November 28, 1861 – December 18, 1943) was an American backup catcher in Major League Baseball. Listed at 5 ft 8 in (1.73 m), 170 lb., Conway batted and threw right-handed. He was born in Lowell, Massachusetts.

Conway was 22 years old when he entered the majors in 1884 with the Philadelphia Quakers, appearing in one game for them before playing seven games with the Baltimore Orioles in 1886.

In a two-season career, Conway was a .111 hitter (2-for-18) with four runs and three RBI without extrabases.

Despite appearing in just eight games, Conway eventually saved himself from baseball anonymity when he made battery with his younger brother, Dick Conway, to form one of 16 pitcher/catcher combinations of brothers in major league history. On August 22, 1886, the Conway brothers appeared in one game while playing for Baltimore.

Following his playing retirement, Conway worked as an engraver at the Middlesex Bleachery in Somerville, Massachusetts, where he died at the age of 82.

== See also ==
- 1884 Philadelphia Quakers season
- 1886 Baltimore Orioles season
