= Ed Sixsmith =

American baseball player (1863–1926)

- Catcher
- Born: February 26, 1863; Philadelphia, Pennsylvania, U.S.
- Died: December 12, 1926 (aged 63); Philadelphia, Pennsylvania, U.S.
- Batted: Right Threw: Right

MLB debut
- September 11, 1884, for the Philadelphia Quakers

Last MLB appearance
- September 11, 1884, for the Philadelphia Quakers

MLB statistics
- Batting average: .000
- Runs: 0
- Runs batted in: 0
- Stats at Baseball Reference

Teams
- Philadelphia Quakers (1884)

Edward Sixsmith (February 26, 1863 – December 12, 1926) was an American professional baseball player who played catcher in the Major Leagues in one game for the 1884 Philadelphia Quakers. He appeared in his game on September 11, 1884 and failed to record a hit in two at-bats. He played minor league ball from 1884–1888.
