= John Crowley (baseball) =

American baseball player (1862–1896)

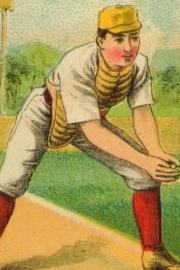
- Catcher
- Born: January 12, 1862; Lawrence, Massachusetts, U.S.
- Died: September 23, 1896 (aged 34); Lawrence, Massachusetts, U.S.
- Batted: Unknown Threw: Unknown

MLB debut
- May 1, 1884, for the Philadelphia Quakers

Last MLB appearance
- September 10, 1884, for the Philadelphia Quakers

MLB statistics
- Batting average: .244
- Runs: 26
- Runs batted in: 19
- Stats at Baseball Reference

Teams
- Philadelphia Quakers (1884)

John A. Crowley (January 12, 1862 – September 23, 1896) was a 19th-century American Major League Baseball player.

== Formative years ==
Born in Lawrence, Massachusetts, on January 12, 1862, Crowley became one of thirteen catchers used by Philadelphia Quakers pilot Harry Wright during the 1884 season. Crowley responded by leading the catching staff with forty-eight games, while hitting .244 (41-for-168) with twenty-six runs scored and nineteen runs batted in, including seven doubles and three triples without home runs.

== Death ==
Crowley died at the age of thirty-four in his hometown of Lawrence, Massachusetts.
