= Atlantic City (minor league baseball) =

Atlantic City was the name of two minor league baseball teams that represented Atlantic City, New Jersey: the first in 1885 and the second in 1912 and 1913. Many teams of this era never adopted formal nicknames.

In 1885, the Wilmington Blue Hens of Wilmington, Delaware relocated to and represented Atlantic City in the Eastern League for one season. In Atlantic City, the team was managed by Joseph Fralinger.

The 1897 Atlantic City team played as members of the Class D level New Jersey State League.

On June 18, 1912, the Lancaster Lanks of Lancaster, Ohio relocated to and represented Atlantic City in the Tri-State League for the remainder of 1912 and for the 1913 season. The team was managed by John Castle.

== Notable players ==
- John Castle
- Bill Culp
- George Mangus
- Rube Manning
- Walter Moser
- Ed Porray
