= Shadow Pyle =

American baseball player (1861–1908)

- Pitcher
- Born: November 29, 1861; Reading, Pennsylvania, U.S.
- Died: December 26, 1908 (aged 47); Reading, Pennsylvania, U.S.
- Batted: Unknown Threw: Left

MLB debut
- October 15, 1884, for the Philadelphia Quakers

Last MLB appearance
- May 13, 1887, for the Chicago White Stockings

MLB statistics
- Win–loss record: 1–4
- Earned run average: 4.54
- Strikeouts: 9
- Stats at Baseball Reference

Teams
- Philadelphia Quakers (1884); Chicago White Stockings (1887)

Harry Thomas "Shadow" Pyle (November 29, 1861 – December 26, 1908) was an American professional baseball player who played pitcher in the Major Leagues for the 1884 Philadelphia Quakers and the 1887 Chicago White Stockings. He played in the minor leagues from 1883–1890.
