= New Jersey State League =

- Classification: Class D (1897)
- Sport: Minor League Baseball
- First season: 1897
- Folded: June 1, 1897
- President: Unknown (1897)
- No. of teams: 4
- Country: United States of America
- Most titles: 1 Bridgeton* (1897)

The New Jersey State League was a Class D level minor league baseball league that played briefly in the 1897 season. The four–team New Jersey State League consisted exclusively of teams based in New Jersey. The New Jersey State League played just the 1897 season before permanently folding.

== History ==
The New Jersey State League began minor league play on April 14, 1897, as a Class D level four–team league. The New Jersey State League was formed with teams based in the New Jersey cities of Asbury Park, Atlantic City, Bridgeton and Millville as the charter members.

After beginning play on April 14, 1897, the New Jersey State League season ended on June 1, 1897. The player statistics and team standings from the 1897 league are unknown. One source lists the teams in the order of: Bridgeton, Millville, Asbury Park and Atlantic City, but without records to align with the order.

The New Jersey State League permanently folded after the 1897 season.

== New Jersey State League teams ==
Team name(s)	City represented	Ballpark	Year
Asbury Park	Asbury Park, New Jersey	Unknown	1897
Atlantic City	Atlantic City, New Jersey	Inlet Park	1897
Bridgeton	Bridgeton, New Jersey	Unknown	1897
Millville	Millville, New Jersey	Unknown	1897

== 1897 New Jersey State League standings ==
The exact 1897 team records and the league standings are unknown. References have the standings listed with Bridgeton in 1st place, followed by Millville, Asbury Park and Atlantic City.

Team standings	W	L	PCT	GB	Managers
Bridgeton	00	00	.000	0.0	NA
Millville	00	00	.000	0.0	NA
Asbury Park	00	00	.000	0.0	NA
Atlantic City	00	00	.000	0.0	NA
