= Joseph Fralinger =

American confectioner (1848-1927)

Joseph F. Fralinger (October 22, 1848 in Sweetwater, New Jersey – May 13, 1927 in Atlantic City, New Jersey) was an American businessman and confectioner, known for being the most successful merchandiser of salt water taffy. The confectionary store he founded in the late 19th century in Atlantic City remains a fixture on its famous boardwalk.

Fralinger was a glassblower and fish merchant before he opened a retail store on the Atlantic City boardwalk to sell his taffy. Within a year, Fralinger had added a taffy concession and spent the winter perfecting the salt water taffy formula, first using molasses, then chocolate and vanilla, eventually creating 25 flavors.

== Life ==
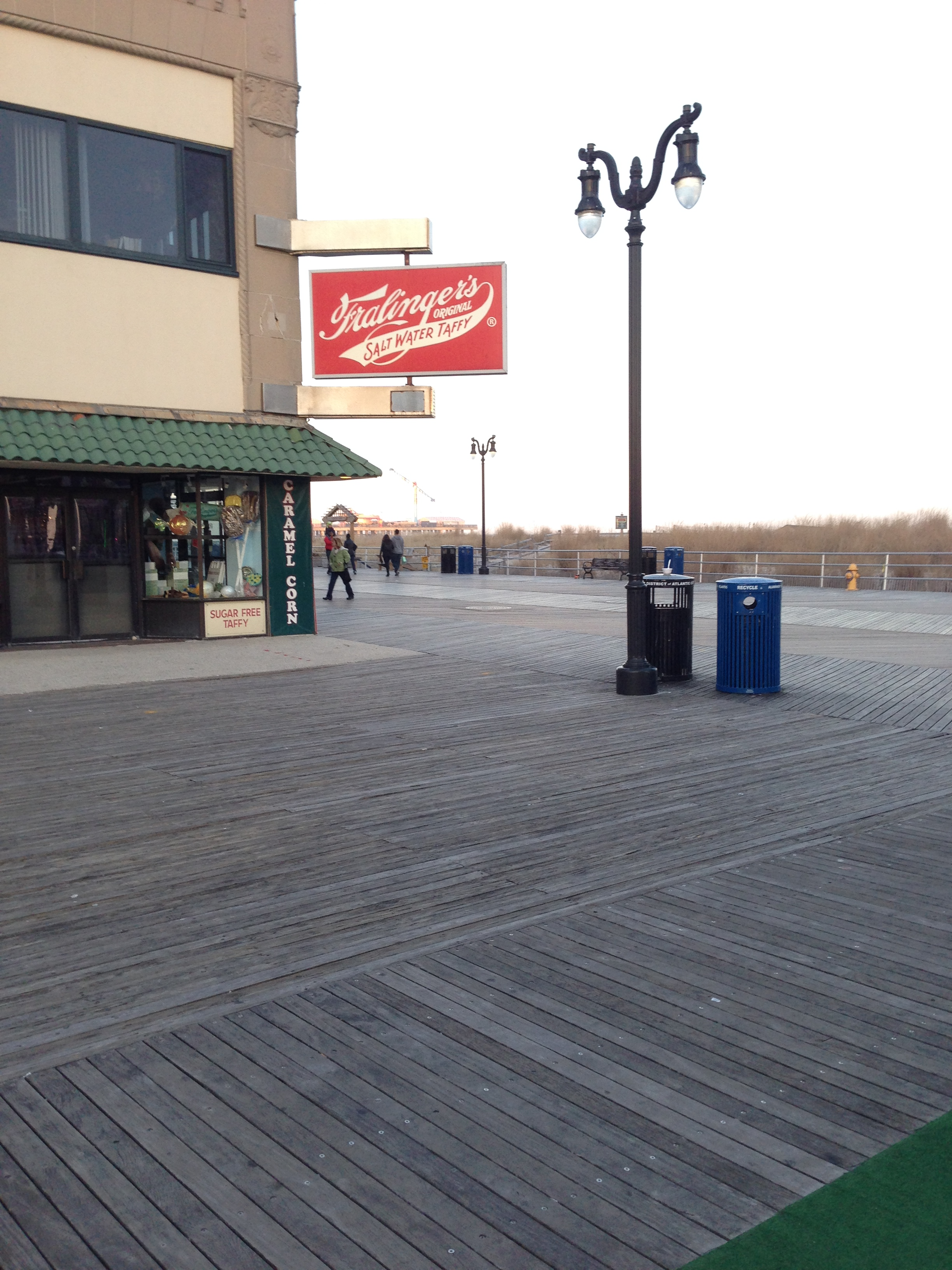
Fralinger shop at Boardwalk and Tennessee Ave. in Atlantic City

Fralinger was born in the Pleasant Mills of Sweetwater, Atlantic County, New Jersey.

Raised by an uncle, his only legacy was the local area's major industry, glass blowing, which he had learned from his father. He worked that trade in Winslow, Waterford, and Philadelphia for 16 years until strikes and disputes drove him to seek other employment. He moved to Philadelphia and worked in the fish and produce markets near 8th street. It was here that he met Nettie B. Beck. They married on June 9, 1870. He prospered there and the 1875 Philadelphia Directory listed, "Jos. Fralingers, Oysters" with his business at 900 E. Tulip Street and his home at Sargent near Tulip.

In his free time he became active in baseball and played on teams with then-notables such as Al Reach. His interest in baseball was strong enough to entice him to manage the Quaker City Baseball Club and then his own ball club at Philadelphia's Jumbo Park. This team won 84 out of 96 games.

Illness of his wife led him to Atlantic City, New Jersey as it was a popular prescription for many illnesses of the late 19th century. He formed and managed a minor league baseball team he named the August Flowers. The team played on a field he leased at New Jersey and Baltic Avenues. At summer's end, he accepted management of the former Wilmington Club. This venture was so unsuccessful that he was forced to sell all of his property and was left virtually penniless.

Having formed a fascination for Atlantic City, he returned and accepted a job with bricklayer Edward S. Lee. His job was hod carrier, which was the bottom of the building trade's ladder. By 1880 the Ritchie Brothers and Windle W. Hollis had set up stands on the Atlantic City Boardwalk to sell taffy, the candy sensation of the day.

The year 1884 found Joseph Fralinger in better financial position and he opened a cigar store at 724 Atlantic Avenue. He leased space for a soft drink stand from Captain John L. Young and Stewart McShea near New York Avenue. Fralinger carried the first baskets of apples from the Florida Avenue Draw Bridge at the Thoroughfare as fresh fruit for his stand. In addition to the apples he offered cider, mineral water, and a 'NEW, cool and refreshing drink to the resort traveler': lemonade, which was to become 'the national drink'. He often attracted visitors to his stand by juggling lemons.

At the end of the Summer of 1884, Captain John L. Young approached Fralinger to take over the taffy stand on the Applegate Pier. Fralinger agreed and in the Winter of 1885, he obtained books on confections. That next spring he made his first batch of Salt Water Taffy. He started with a molasses flavor, but quickly added the traditional favorites of Chocolate and Vanilla. As time went on more were added until the largest selection offered 25 different flavors.

As Fralinger became accustomed to the Salt Water Taffy business, he came on the idea of a 'box' of Salt Water Taffy. He obtained 200 boxes for the first weekend of his new idea and to his amazement the one-pounders were sold out by Sunday noon. He immediately ran to a nearby seafood restaurant and finished the day's sales with oyster boxes. The one pound box of taffy became and still is the most popular size. It is "The Atlantic City Souvenir".

The year 1889 saw the first mention of Salt Water Taffy in the Atlantic City Directory, "Hollis Windle W., Original Salt Water Taffy, Boardwalk near Arkansas Avenue." Salt Water Taffy was not again listed until the 1899 Atlantic City Directory, when forty-two 'Confectioners' were listed. Only John Cassidy and Joseph Fralinger are associated with Salt Water Taffy from the names shown. The city was growing rapidly and Salt Water Taffy was becoming a household word. While Fralinger's idea of boxing taffy earned him the title "King of Salt Water Taffy", it did not discourage his further enterprises.

His friendship with John L. Young and Stewart McShea led to numerous real estate ventures including the Toboggan Slide at Ocean Avenue. At New York Avenue he built the Fralinger Pharmacy, a Fralinger Candy Store, and the first, real Boardwalk theater, The Academy of Music. The New York Avenue apartments were named the Jeanette Apartments, after his wife. Later, they were known as the Fralinger Apartments.

Fralinger spearheaded the drive in 1896 along with Young, McShea, and numerous Boardwalk land owners to increase the Boardwalk's width to sixty feet on a new steel foundation. He also fought to keep the railroads from laying tracks on the Ocean side of the Boardwalk. Through his real estate interests, he helped to build Chalfont and Westminster Avenues.

Fralinger was a member of the volunteer Neptune Hose Company. Their headquarters were located at Connecticut and Atlantic Avenues. Established in 1882, they remained in force until 1904.

Fralinger maintained a summer residence in Schwenksville, Montgomery County, Pennsylvania. It was located high atop Spring Mountain overlooking the picturesque Perkiomen Valley. It was here that he became interested in a boys camp that was in need of repair. He purchased 11 acres (45,000 m^{2}) of land along the river and donated it to the Boy Scouts for use as a summer camp. Named Camp Fralinger in his honor, it was well used, especially by Boy Scouts from the Atlantic City area. During his later years, he also maintained a home in Miami, Florida.

Joseph F. Fralinger died at 78 years old on May 13, 1927, and was laid to rest at the Atlantic City Cemetery on the mainland.
