= Hezekiah Allen =

American baseball player (1863–1916)

- Catcher
- Born: February 25, 1863; Westport, Connecticut
- Died: September 21, 1916 (aged 53); Saugatuck, Connecticut
- Batted: Unknown Threw: Unknown

MLB debut
- May 16, 1884, for the Philadelphia Quakers

Last MLB appearance
- May 16, 1884, for the Philadelphia Quakers

MLB statistics
- Games played: 1
- At bats: 3
- Hits: 2
- Stats at Baseball Reference

Teams
- Philadelphia Quakers (1884)

Hezekiah Allen (February 25, 1863 – September 21, 1916) was a Major League Baseball catcher. Allen played for the Philadelphia Quakers in 1884. In 1 career game, he had two hits in three at-bats. It is unknown which hand he batted and threw with. Allen was also known by his nickname, Ki.

Allen was born in Westport, Connecticut and died in Saugatuck, Connecticut.
