= Anderson Machado =

Venezuelan baseball player (born 1981)

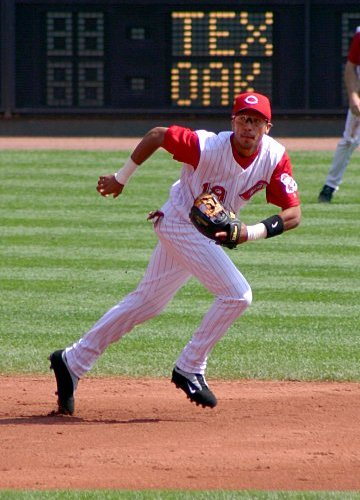
- Shortstop
- Born: January 25, 1981 (age 44); Caracas, Venezuela
- Bats: Switch Throws: Right

MLB debut
- September 27, 2003, for the Philadelphia Phillies

MLB statistics
- Batting average: .221
- Home runs: 0
- Runs batted in: 6
- Stats at Baseball Reference

Teams
- Philadelphia Phillies (2003); Cincinnati Reds (2004–2005); Colorado Rockies (2005)

Anderson Javier Machado [ma-CHA-do] (born January 25, 1981) is a Venezuelan former professional baseball shortstop.

== Career ==
Machado was signed as a non-drafted free agent by the Philadelphia Phillies in 1998. He made his debut in American professional baseball in 1999 when he played for the Rookie League Gulf Coast League Phillies, Class A Piedmont Boll Weevils, and Class A-Advanced Clearwater Phillies. In 2000 and 2001, he played for both Clearwater and the Double-A Reading Phillies. All of his 2002 season and the majority of his 2003 season was spent in Reading. Machado made his Major League debut on September 27, 2003, for the Philadelphia Phillies.

Early in the 2004 season, he played for Clearwater and the Triple-A Scranton/Wilkes-Barre Red Barons. On July 30, Machado was traded with Josh Hancock to Cincinnati Reds for Brad Correll and Todd Jones. He played in 17 games for the Reds, but also played for the Triple-A Louisville Bats. The 24-year-old shortstop began 2005 on the 15-day disabled list following offseason surgery to repair a torn medial collateral ligament and torn meniscus in his left knee. He appeared in two games for the Reds in 2005, both as a pinch hitter, and was 0-for-2 at the plate; he also spent time in Louisville. Machado was claimed off waivers on July 20 by the Colorado Rockies. He played four games for the Rockies in addition to playing for the Triple-A Colorado Springs Sky Sox.

After becoming a free agent following his time with the Rockies organization, he was signed to a minor league contract with the Reds. He played in 2006 with the Double-A Chattanooga Lookouts, and 2007 with Triple-A Louisville. Machado wound up in the New York Mets system in 2008. During this time, he played with the Class A (Short Season) Brooklyn Cyclones, Double-A Binghamton Mets, and Triple-A New Orleans Zephyrs.

Machado began the 2009 season in the Pittsburgh Pirates minor league system. He saw playing time with the Double-A Altoona Curve and Triple-A Indianapolis Indians. On May 28, 2009, he was traded to the Chicago Cubs for future considerations. He played for their Triple-A Iowa Cubs. After being released by the Cubs, Machado played for the independent Atlantic League's Lancaster Barnstormers. In 2010, he was signed to a minor league contract with the Milwaukee Brewers and played for their Double-A Huntsville Stars.

== See also ==
- List of Major League Baseball players from Venezuela
