= Frank Ringo =

American baseball player (1860–1889)

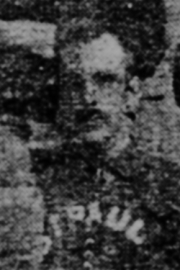
- Catcher
- Born: October 12, 1862; Parkville, Missouri
- Died: April 12, 1889 (aged 26); Kansas City, Missouri
- Batted: Right Threw: Unknown

MLB debut
- May 1, 1883, for the Philadelphia Quakers

Last MLB appearance
- September 18, 1886, for the Kansas City Cowboys

MLB statistics
- Batting average: .192
- Home runs: 0
- Runs batted in: 32
- Stats at Baseball Reference

Teams
- Philadelphia Quakers (1883–84); Philadelphia Athletics (1884); Detroit Wolverines (1885); Pittsburgh Alleghenys (1885–86); Kansas City Cowboys (1886)

Frank C. Ringo (October 12, 1862 – April 12, 1889) was a professional baseball player from 1880 to 1888. He played four seasons of Major League Baseball as a catcher for the Philadelphia Quakers (1883–84), Philadelphia Athletics (1884), Detroit Wolverines (1885), Pittsburgh Alleghenys (1885–86), and Kansas City Cowboys (1886). He committed suicide by morphine overdose in April 1889 at age 28. Ringo's suicide is the earliest by a major league baseball player to be recorded in the Baseball Almanac. (Note: There was an earlier recorded case, Fraley Rogers, who committed suicide in 1881; however, due to debate among baseball historians as to when the MLB actually began, he is not always counted (Baseball Almanac considers the first year of the MLB to be 1876, which would exclude Rogers given his debut in 1872, while other sites such as Baseball Reference say 1871 was the first year, which would include him).)

== Early life ==
Ringo was born in Parkville, Missouri, in 1860. Ringo began his professional baseball career in 1880 playing for Kansas City. He also played minor league baseball in Peoria, Illinois.

== Major League Baseball ==
=== Philadelphia ===
When the Peoria baseball club closed, Ringo signed with the Philadelphia Quakers. He made his major league debut on May 1, 1883, at age 22. During the 1883 season, he appeared in 60 games for the Quakers, 39 as a catcher, 11 as an outfielder, six as a shortstop, five as a third baseman and two as a second baseman. He compiled a .190 batting average with 10 doubles, a triple and 12 RBIs in 221 at bats. Despite his poor offensive showing, Ringo displayed impressive defensive capabilities behind the plate. In only 39 games as a catcher, Ringo managed to rank fourth among the National League's catchers with six double plays turned and fifth among the league's catchers with a 6.10 range factor.

Ringo began the 1884 season with the Quakers and compiled a .132 batting average with two doubles and six RBIs in 91 at bats. He appeared in 26 games with the 1884 Quakers, all as a catcher. In August 1884, Ringo was released by the Quakers and signed as a free agent by the Philadelphia Athletics of the American Association. He appeared in only two games for the Quakers and had no hits in six at bats.

=== Detroit ===
In 1885, Ringo signed with the Detroit Wolverines as a backup to catcher Charlie Bennett. Ringo appeared in 17 games for the Wolverines, including eight games each at catcher and third base. He compiled a career high .246 batting average in 65 at bats for Detroit. However, he was released by the Wolverines and fined $100 for what the Sporting News described as "lushing."

=== Pittsburgh ===
After his release from Detroit, Ringo reportedly "dropped out of public notice altogether." In early September 1885, the Sporting Life reported that he had "finally pulled himself together" and had recently been catching and playing creditable first and second base for Augusta. He next played with the Pittsburgh Alleghenys of the American Association at the end of the 1885 season. He appeared in a total of 18 games, nine each at catcher and first base, for Pittsburgh during the 1885 and 1886 seasons. He compiled a .182 batting average for Pittsburgh in 1885 and increased his average to .214 in 1886.

=== Kansas City ===
Ringo concluded his major league career appearing in 16 games, 13 at catcher, for the Kansas City Cowboys in 1886. He compiled a .232 batting average with seven doubles and seven RBIs in 56 at bats for the Cowboys.

== Later years ==
During the 1887 season, Ringo remained with the Kansas City baseball club, though it had joined the Western League and was no longer a major league club. Ringo compiled a career high .382 batting average in 1887. He appeared 67 games, showing versatility with appearances at catcher (35 games), outfield (12 games), second base (11 games), shortstop (nine games), first base (three games) and third base (two games).

Ringo played his last professional baseball games in 1888 as a member of the St. Paul Apostles of the Western Association. He appeared in 32 games and compiled a .262 batting average. According to a report in a St. Paul newspaper, Ringo was perceived there as "an excellent catcher and hard hitter, and on and off the ball field was a bright and companionable gentleman." During his off-seasons, Ringo worked as a traveling salesman for a firm in Kansas City.

== Final weeks ==
On January 1, 1889, Ringo was married to Emma Williams of Fort Scott, Kansas. After a lengthy period of battling problems with alcohol, Ringo had reportedly stopped drinking in the late summer or fall of 1888. In late January, the Sporting Life reported that Ringo was in Kansas City "without an engagement for next season." The newspaper further noted that Ringo had played well in 1888 and opined: "He is a good man when he keeps straight, and he has kept straight for a long time now. Here's a chance for some team to secure a good, hard-working catcher." He signed to catch for the Kansas City baseball club and reported to training camp in the middle of March. For several months prior to reporting to training camp, it was reported that Ringo "had not touched whisky, of which he is inordinately fond."

Shortly after training camp began in March 1889, Ringo resumed drinking and had been on a "terrible spree" for two weeks before his death. On the afternoon of April 11, 1889, Ringo ingested 40 grains of morphine at his mother's residence at 1214 Virginia Avenue in Kansas City. It was reported that the morphine was his second attempt at suicide, and his actions were motivated by feelings of mortification and shame at being unable to free himself from alcohol. According to one newspaper account, the suicide was "deliberately planned and carefully executed", and the drug had hours to take its effect before Ringo's condition was discovered. A doctor was called and at 10:30 p.m., Ringo was declared to be in dangerous condition. He died at 9 a.m. the next day in the presence of his family.

Ringo was buried at Elmwood Cemetery in Kansas City.
