= Sparrow Morton =

American baseball player (1858–1917)

- Pitcher
- Born: August 7, 1858; Philadelphia, Pennsylvania, U.S.
- Died: July 18, 1917 (aged 58); Norristown, Pennsylvania, U.S.
- Batted: Unknown Threw: Left

MLB debut
- July 15, 1884, for the Philadelphia Quakers

Last MLB appearance
- July 26, 1884, for the Philadelphia Quakers

MLB statistics
- Win–loss record: 0–2
- Earned run average: 5.29
- Strikeouts: 5
- Stats at Baseball Reference

Teams
- Philadelphia Quakers (1884)

William P. Morton (August 7, 1858 – July 18, 1917) was an American professional baseball player who played pitcher in the Major Leagues in two games for the 1884 Philadelphia Quakers. He later played in the minors in 1885 and 1886.

Morton was born in Philadelphia, Pennsylvania. He died in Norristown, Pennsylvania at the age of 58.
