= Jack Scheible =

American baseball player (1866–1897)

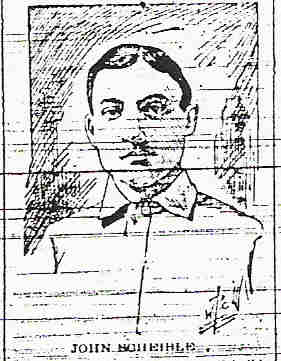
- Pitcher
- Born: February 16, 1866; Youngstown, Ohio, U.S.
- Died: August 6, 1897 (aged 31); Youngstown, Ohio, U.S.
- Batted: Unknown Threw: Left

MLB debut
- September 8, 1893, for the Cleveland Spiders

Last MLB appearance
- September 20, 1894, for the Philadelphia Phillies

MLB statistics
- Win–loss record: 1–2
- Earned run average: 5.40
- Batting average: .143
- Stats at Baseball Reference

Teams
- Cleveland Spiders (1893); Philadelphia Phillies (1894)

John G. Scheible (February 16, 1866 – August 6, 1897) was an American professional baseball player who pitched for two different teams over two seasons. He made his debut in 1893 with the Cleveland Spiders and played for the Philadelphia Phillies the following year.

He was born in the village of Brier Hill, now part of Youngstown, Ohio, an industrial town located near the Pennsylvania border.

== Amateur and professional career ==
Scheible's obituary in The Youngstown Telegram says that he was employed at a local flour mill before he began playing ball with minor league teams affiliated with the Tri-State League, Iron & Oil League, and New England League.

In the early 1890s, he broke into the National League.

== Later years ==
Upon his retirement from the National League, Scheible returned to Youngstown, where he continued to play amateur and semi-professional ball. He contracted pneumonia shortly after being hired to pitch for a game in Erie, Pennsylvania. Scheible became aware of his condition as he was about to board a train to Erie. He was rushed to Mahoning County Hospital, where he died a few days later.

Scheible's obituary states that he was survived by his father, John Sr., three sisters, Elizabeth and Katherine Scheible and Mrs. Mary Miller, and brothers Charles and William. (His surviving brother Charles became mayor of Youngstown in the early 1920s.)

The newspaper article described Jack Scheible in the following terms: "As a ballplayer he was a determined person and as a citizen always sociable, quiet and unassuming".
