= Mike DePangher =

American baseball player (1858–1915)

- Catcher
- Born: September 11, 1858; Marysville, California
- Died: July 7, 1915 (aged 56); San Francisco, California
- Batted: Left Threw: Unknown

MLB debut
- August 8, 1884, for the Philadelphia Quakers

Last MLB appearance
- September 11, 1884, for the Philadelphia Quakers

MLB statistics
- Batting average: .200
- Runs: 0
- Runs batted in: 0
- Stats at Baseball Reference

Teams
- Philadelphia Quakers (1884)

Michael Anthony DePangher (September 11, 1858 – July 7, 1915) was a professional baseball player who played catcher in the Major Leagues for the 1884 Philadelphia Quakers.
