= Alexander Donoghue =

American baseball player (1863–1931)

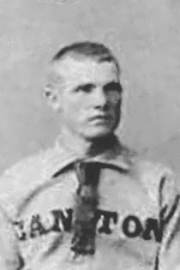
- Donoghue in 1887 with Canton of the Ohio State League
- Outfielder / Shortstop
- Born: December 1863; Altoona, Pennsylvania, U.S.
- Died: July 11, 1931 (aged 67); Pittsburgh, Pennsylvania, U.S.
- Batted: Unknown Threw: Left

MLB debut
- August 24, 1891, for the Philadelphia Phillies

Last MLB appearance
- August 29, 1891, for the Philadelphia Phillies

MLB statistics
- Batting average: .318
- Home runs: 0
- Runs batted in: 2
- Stats at Baseball Reference

Teams
- Philadelphia Phillies (1891)

Alexander F. Donoghue (December 1863 – July 11, 1931) was an American Major League Baseball player. He played outfield and shortstop for the 1891 Philadelphia Phillies of the National League. He played in the minor leagues from 1886 through 1896.
