= Heinie Kappel =

American baseball player (1863–1905)

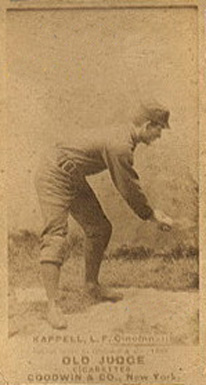
- Infielder
- Born: September 1863; Philadelphia, Pennsylvania, US
- Died: August 27, 1905 (aged 41); Philadelphia, Pennsylvania, US
- Batted: Right Threw: Right

MLB debut
- May 22, 1887, for the Cincinnati Red Stockings

Last MLB appearance
- August 1, 1889, for the Columbus Solons

MLB statistics
- Batting average: .269
- Home runs: 4
- Runs batted in: 51
- Stolen bases: 33
- Stats at Baseball Reference

Teams
- Cincinnati Red Stockings (1887–1888); Columbus Solons (1889)

Henry "Heinie" Kappel (September 1863 – August 27, 1905) was an American infielder. He played professional baseball for eleven years from 1884 to 1895, including three seasons in Major League Baseball with the Cincinnati Red Stockings (1887–1888) and Columbus Solons (1889).

== Formative years and family ==
Kappel was born in Philadelphia in 1863. He began playing professional baseball in 1884 for the New Castle Neshannocks. He continued in the minor leagues for the Augusta Browns and Wilmington Blue Hens in 1885 and the Augusta Browns, Chattanooga Lookouts, and Syracuse Stars in 1886. Kappel's brother Joe Kappel also played in Major League Baseball.

== Career ==
Kappel made his major-league debut in 1887 with the Cincinnati Red Stockings. He played for Cincinnati in 1887 and 1888, appearing in fifty-nine games and compiling a .267 batting average. In 1889, he played for the Columbus Solons, appearing in forty-six games and compiling a .272 batting average. In three major-league season, Kappel played in 105 games: forty-nine games at shortstop, thirty-three at third base, and sixteen at second base. As a batter, he had fifty-four hits, fifty-one runs batted in, and a .269 career batting average.

Kappel continued playing in the minor leagues through the 1895 season, including stints with teams in Sioux City, Albany, Allentown, Buffalo, Albany, Harrisburg, and Bridgetown.

== Death ==
Kappel died on August 27, 1905, at the age of forty-one in Philadelphia.
