= Gene Vadeboncoeur =

American baseball player (1859–1893)

Eugene Vadeboncoeur
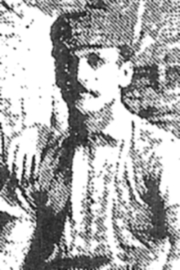
- Catcher
- Born: September 5, 1859; Louiseville, Canada East
- Died: April 16, 1893 (aged 33); Sacramento, California, U.S.
- Batted: Right Threw: Right

MLB debut
- July 11, 1884, for the Philadelphia Quakers

Last MLB appearance
- July 22, 1884, for the Philadelphia Quakers

MLB statistics
- Batting average: .214
- Home runs: 0
- Runs batted in: 3
- Stats at Baseball Reference

Teams
- Philadelphia Quakers (1884)

Onesime Eugene Vadeboncoeur (September 5, 1859 – April 16, 1893) was a Major League Baseball player. Vadeboncoeur played for Philadelphia Quakers in the 1884 season. He played in four games, collecting three hits in 14 at-bats, totaling a .214 batting average. He is the first native of Quebec to play in Major League Baseball. Gene's contributions to the Immaculate Grid (#247) are well known. His batting average ranks in the top 23,143 of all time.
