= Joe Kappel =

American baseball player (1857–1929)

- Outfielder / Shortstop / Third baseman
- Born: April 27, 1857; Philadelphia, Pennsylvania, U.S.
- Died: July 8, 1929 (aged 72); Philadelphia, Pennsylvania, U.S.
- Batted: Right Threw: Unknown

MLB debut
- May 26, 1884, for the Philadelphia Quakers

Last MLB appearance
- September 8, 1890, for the Philadelphia Athletics

MLB statistics
- Batting average: .229
- Runs: 30
- Runs batted in: 22
- Stats at Baseball Reference

Teams
- Philadelphia Quakers (1884); Philadelphia Athletics (1890)

Joseph Kappel (April 27, 1857 – July 8, 1929) was an American professional baseball player who played catcher, infield and outfield in the Major Leagues in 1884 and 1890. He continued to play in the minor leagues through 1896. His brother Heinie Kappel also played in the Major Leagues.

Kappel played semi-professional baseball in the Philadelphia area before starting his professional baseball career with the Reading Actives of the Interstate Association in 1883. In 1884 he started the season with the Baltimore Monumentals of the Eastern League as a catcher. At Baltimore he was a teammate of pitcher Jim McElroy and in May he and McElroy were promoted together to the Major Leagues with the Philadelphia Quakers of the National League. He made his Major League debut on May 26, 1884 catching McElroy, despite having an injured hand. In that game he had 7 or 8 passed balls catching McElroy, who was notoriously wild (he threw 46 wild pitches in 111 innings pitched for his National League career). He also made 13 errors in that game. He only lasted 4 games for Philadelphia, where he had 1 hit in 15 at bats, and 20 passed balls and 9 errors as a catcher. After being released by Philadelphia he returned to the Eastern League with the Allentown Dukes for the remainder of the 1884 season.

After several more seasons in the minor leagues, he returned to the Major Leagues in 1890 with the Philadelphia Athletics of the American Association. He played in 56 games for the Athletics, splitting time between catcher and several infield and outfield positions. After the Athletics folded he returned to the minor leagues, where he played for various teams until 1896.
