= Cyclone Miller =

American baseball player (1859–1916)

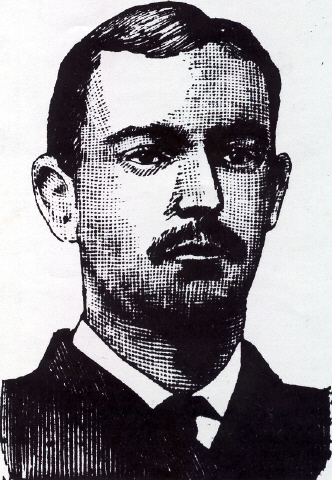
- Pitcher
- Born: September 24, 1859; Springfield, Massachusetts, U.S.
- Died: October 16, 1916 (aged 57); New London, Connecticut, U.S.
- Batted: Unknown Threw: Left

MLB debut
- July 11, 1884, for the Chicago Browns

Last MLB appearance
- October 14, 1886, for the Philadelphia Athletics

MLB statistics
- Win–loss record: 14-10
- Earned run average: 2.74
- Strikeouts: 124
- Stats at Baseball Reference

Teams
- Chicago Browns/Pittsburgh Stogies (1884); Providence Grays (1884); Philadelphia Athletics (1886)

Joseph H. "Cyclone" Miller (September 24, 1859 – October 13, 1916) was an American pitcher in Major League Baseball born in Springfield, Massachusetts. He played just two seasons in the majors, but did play with three teams in three leagues. He stood at 5'9".

== Career ==
=== 1884 ===
Miller's major league career began in 1884 for the Chicago Browns/Pittsburgh Stogies of the Union Association. He lasted just one start, in which he threw a complete-game victory, allowing only two runs. He then moved on to the Providence Grays, filling in the rotation due to injuries to their top pitchers, Charles Radbourn and Charlie Sweeney. Even though he did pitch well for long stretches during the games, he struggled to secure the victories in the late innings and was replaced. On July 31, 1884, in a road game versus the New York Gothams, he was appointed umpire due to the scheduled umpire calling in sick. The New York fans thought his calls were decidedly one-sided toward his Grays team, and he had to have a police escort off the field after the game. The game ended in a 3-3 tie.

On one occasion, with Miller playing right field, the manager had wanted Sweeney to switch from pitcher to right field to bring in Miller to pitch in the 9th inning. Sweeney refused the move and walked off the field, and because of the rules during that time, Miller had to pitch the game with only two outfielders. He lost the game, and Sweeney was suspended for a game for violating the manager's order. Instead of serving the suspension, Sweeney quit the team and joined the St. Louis Maroons of Union Association, leaving Radbourn to shoulder the team's pitching duties for the rest of the season. It was that season that Radbourn set his all-time record for wins with 60, which under today's rules would have only been 59 because in one game, he relieved Miller with Providence having the lead after five innings. On September 13, when the team departed on a lengthy road trip, they decided not to bring Miller along with them, thus ending his short tenure with the team. He compiled a 3–2 records in five starts and one relief appearance that resulted in a late-inning loss.

=== 1886 ===
Miller spent 1885 in the minor leagues. He started 1886 with Macon of the Southern Association but finished it with the Philadelphia Athletics of the American Association. He went 10-8 that season, completing all of his starts and throwing one shutout. On August 20, he threw a one-hitter, giving up his one hit in the ninth inning and losing 1-0 to the Baltimore Orioles, and their young fireballer Matt Kilroy. During this season, he played one game at third base, becoming one of only 36 left-handed players to have played at least one game at that position.

== Later life ==
Miller died at the age of 57 in New London, Connecticut, and was interred at Comstock Cemetery in Montville, Connecticut.
