= Brooklyn Ward's Wonders all-time roster =

List of baseball players

The Brooklyn Ward's Wonders were a professional baseball team based in Brooklyn, New York, that played in the Players' League for one season in 1890. The franchise used Eastern Park as their home field. During their only season in existence, the team finished second in the PL with a record of 76-56.

== Players ==
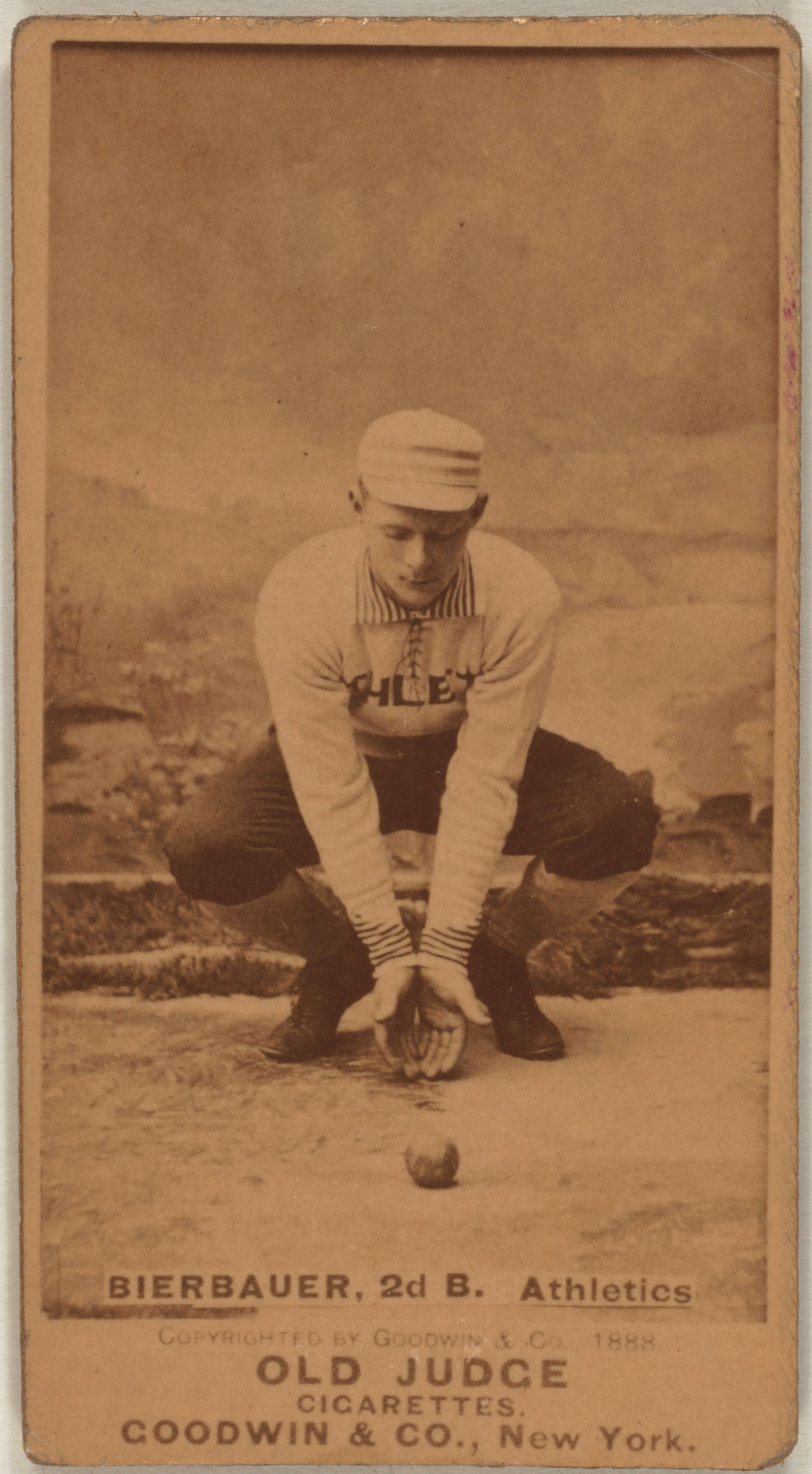
Second baseman Lou Bierbauer had a .306 batting average with the Ward's Wonders.

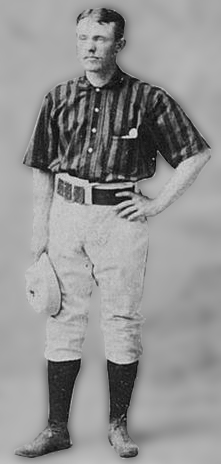
Shortstop Monte Ward is the only Ward's Wonders player in the Baseball Hall of Fame.

Key to symbols in player table
§	Player was a player-manager
†	Inducted into the National Baseball Hall of Fame and Museum

Players who played for the Brooklyn Ward's Wonders, primary position played, and season(s) played for franchise
Player	Position(s)	Season(s)	Notes	Ref
Ed Andrews	Center fielder	1890		
Lou Bierbauer	Second baseman	1890		
Paul Cook	Catcher	1890		
Con Daily	Catcher	1890		
Jackie Hayes	Right fielder / Shortstop	1890		
George Hemming	Pitcher	1890		
Bill Joyce	Third baseman	1890		
Tom Kinslow	Catcher	1890		
Jack McGeachey	Right fielder / Center fielder	1890		
Con Murphy	Pitcher	1890		
Dave Orr	First baseman	1890	In his last major league season, Orr led the Ward's Wonders in batting average (.371) and runs batted in (124).	
Emmett Seery	Left fielder	1890		
John Sowders	Pitcher	1890		
Art Sunday	Right fielder	1890		
George Van Haltren	Right fielder / Pitcher	1890		
Monte Ward^{§†}	Shortstop	1890	Ward managed the Ward's Wonders and also led the team in runs scored (134) and hits (188).	
Gus Weyhing	Pitcher	1890	Weyhing led the Ward's Wonders in innings pitched (390), wins (30), earned run average (3.60), and strikeouts (177).	
