= 1890 Brooklyn Ward's Wonders season =

1890 Brooklyn Ward's Wonders
- League: Players' League
- Ballpark: Eastern Park
- City: Brooklyn, New York
- Record: 76–56 (.576)
- League place: 2nd
- Owner: George Chauncey
- Manager: John Montgomery Ward

The 1890 Brooklyn Ward's Wonders baseball team was a member of the short lived Players' League. They compiled a 76–56 record, good for second place. The team was named by the press for their manager, John Montgomery Ward, who helped to organize the Players' League. After the season, the league folded, and the Wonders were bought out by the National League's Brooklyn Bridegrooms.

== Regular season ==
=== Season standings ===
Players' League
Team	W	L	Pct.	GB	Home	Road
Boston Reds	81	48	.628	—	48‍–‍21	33‍–‍27
Brooklyn Ward's Wonders	76	56	.576	6½	46‍–‍19	30‍–‍37
New York Giants	74	57	.565	8	47‍–‍19	27‍–‍38
Chicago Pirates	75	62	.547	10	46‍–‍23	29‍–‍39
Philadelphia Athletics	68	63	.519	14	35‍–‍30	33‍–‍33
Pittsburgh Burghers	60	68	.469	20½	37‍–‍28	23‍–‍40
Cleveland Infants	55	75	.423	26½	31‍–‍30	24‍–‍45
Buffalo Bisons	36	96	.273	46½	23‍–‍42	13‍–‍54

=== Record vs. opponents ===
1890 Players' League record Sources:
Team	BSR	BKW	BUF	CPI	CLI	NYK	PHQ	PBU
Boston	—	11–7	14–6–1	12–8	12–8	12–8	10–6	10–5
Brooklyn	7–11	—	12–6–1	10–9	12–8	7–10	14–6	14–6
Buffalo	6–14–1	6–12–1	—	5–15	7–9	3–17	4–16	5–13
Chicago	8–12	9–10	15–5	—	13–7	9–9–1	10–10	11–9
Cleveland	8–12	8–12	9–7	7–13	—	8–11	8–11–1	7–9
New York	8–12	10–7	17–3	9–9–1	11–8	—	5–12	14–6
Philadelphia	6–10	6–14	16–4	10–10	11–8–1	12–5	—	7–12
Pittsburgh	5–10	6–14	13–5	9–11	9–7	6–14	12–7	—

=== Roster ===
1890 Brooklyn Ward's Wonders
Roster
Pitchers: George Hemming; Con Murphy; John Sowders; Gus Weyhing	Catchers: Paul Cook; Con Daily; Tom Kinslow; Infielders: Lou Bierbauer; Bill Joyce; Dave Orr; John Ward	Outfielders: Ed Andrews; Jackie Hayes; Jack McGeachey; Emmett Seery; Art Sunday; George Van Haltren	Manager: John Ward

== Player stats ==
=== Batting ===
==== Starters by position ====
Note: Pos = Position; G = Games played; AB = At bats; H = Hits; Avg. = Batting average; HR = Home runs; RBI = Runs batted in

Pos	Player	G	AB	H	Avg.	HR	RBI
C	Tom Kinslow	64	242	64	.264	4	46
1B	Dave Orr	107	464	172	.371	6	124
2B	Lou Bierbauer	133	589	180	.306	7	99
3B	Bill Joyce	133	489	123	.252	1	78
SS	John Ward	128	561	188	.335	4	60
OF	Emmett Seery	104	394	88	.223	1	50
OF	Ed Andrews	94	395	100	.253	3	38
OF	Jack McGeachey	104	443	108	.244	1	65

==== Other batters ====
Note: G = Games played; AB = At bats; H = Hits; Avg. = Batting average; HR = Home runs; RBI = Runs batted in

Player	G	AB	H	Avg.	HR	RBI
George Van Haltren	92	376	126	.335	5	54
Paul Cook	58	218	55	.252	0	31
Con Daily	46	168	42	.250	0	35
Art Sunday	24	83	22	.265	0	13
Jackie Hayes	12	42	8	.190	0	5

=== Pitching ===
==== Starting pitchers ====
Note: G = Games pitched; IP = Innings pitched; W = Wins; L = Losses; ERA = Earned run average; SO = Strikeouts

Player	G	IP	W	L	ERA	SO
Gus Weyhing	49	390.0	30	16	3.60	177
John Sowders	39	309.0	19	16	3.82	91
George Van Haltren	28	223.0	15	10	4.28	48

==== Other pitchers ====
Note: G = Games pitched; IP = Innings pitched; W = Wins; L = Losses; ERA = Earned run average; SO = Strikeouts

Player	G	IP	W	L	ERA	SO
Con Murphy	20	139.0	4	10	4.79	29
George Hemming	19	123.0	8	4	3.80	32
