= 1888 Philadelphia Athletics season =

1888 Philadelphia Athletics
- League: American Association
- Ballpark: Jefferson Street Grounds
- City: Philadelphia, Pennsylvania
- Record: 81–52 (.609)
- League place: 3rd
- Owners: Bill Sharsig, H. C. Pennypacker, William Whittaker
- Manager: Bill Sharsig

The 1888 Philadelphia Athletics finished with an 81–52 record and finished in third place in the American Association.

== Regular season ==
=== Season standings ===
American Association
| Team | W | L | Pct. | GB | Home | Road |
|---|---|---|---|---|---|---|
| St. Louis Browns | 92 | 43 | .681 | — | 60‍–‍21 | 32‍–‍22 |
| Brooklyn Bridegrooms | 88 | 52 | .629 | 6½ | 53‍–‍20 | 35‍–‍32 |
| Philadelphia Athletics | 81 | 52 | .609 | 10 | 55‍–‍20 | 26‍–‍32 |
| Cincinnati Red Stockings | 80 | 54 | .597 | 11½ | 56‍–‍25 | 24‍–‍29 |
| Baltimore Orioles | 57 | 80 | .416 | 36 | 30‍–‍26 | 27‍–‍54 |
| Cleveland Blues | 50 | 82 | .379 | 40½ | 33‍–‍27 | 17‍–‍55 |
| Louisville Colonels | 48 | 87 | .356 | 44 | 27‍–‍29 | 21‍–‍58 |
| Kansas City Cowboys | 43 | 89 | .326 | 47½ | 23‍–‍34 | 20‍–‍55 |

=== Record vs. opponents ===
1888 American Association record Sources:
| Team | BAL | BRO | CIN | CLE | KC | LOU | PHA | STL |
|---|---|---|---|---|---|---|---|---|
| Baltimore | — | 8–12 | 6–14 | 10–9 | 11–8 | 11–9 | 5–14 | 6–14 |
| Brooklyn | 12–8 | — | 14–6–1 | 16–4 | 11–9 | 13–7 | 12–8–1 | 10–10–1 |
| Cincinnati | 14–6 | 6–14–1 | — | 10–7–1 | 15–4 | 17–3–1 | 10–10 | 8–10 |
| Cleveland | 9–10 | 4–16 | 7–10–1 | — | 10–9 | 9–8–2 | 7–13 | 4–16 |
| Kansas City | 8–11 | 9–11 | 4–15 | 9–10 | — | 6–12 | 3–14 | 4–16 |
| Louisville | 9–11 | 7–13 | 3–17–1 | 8–9–2 | 12–6 | — | 5–15–1 | 4–16 |
| Philadelphia | 14–5 | 8–12–1 | 10–10 | 13–7 | 14–3 | 15–5–1 | — | 7–10–1 |
| St. Louis | 14–6 | 10–10–1 | 10–8 | 16–4 | 16–4 | 16–4 | 10–7–1 | — |

=== Roster ===
1888 Philadelphia Athletics
Roster
| Pitchers: Bill Blair; Bob Gamble; Mike Mattimore; Ed Seward; Phenomenal Smith; Gus Weyhing | Catchers: Bill Farmer; Whitey Gibson; Tom Gunning; Wilbert Robinson; George Townsend; Frank Zinn; Infielders: Lou Bierbauer; Frank Fennelly; Bill Gleason; Henry Larkin; Denny Lyons | Outfielders: Tom Poorman; Blondie Purcell; Harry Stovey; Mike Sullivan; Curt Welch | Manager: Bill Sharsig |

== Player stats ==
=== Batting ===
==== Starters by position ====
Note: Pos = Position; G = Games played; AB = At bats; H = Hits; Avg. = Batting average; HR = Home runs; RBI = Runs batted in

| Pos | Player | G | AB | H | Avg. | HR | RBI |
|---|---|---|---|---|---|---|---|
| C | Wilbert Robinson | 66 | 254 | 62 | .244 | 1 | 31 |
| 1B | Henry Larkin | 135 | 546 | 147 | .269 | 7 | 101 |
| 2B | Lou Bierbauer | 134 | 535 | 143 | .267 | 0 | 80 |
| SS | Bill Gleason | 123 | 499 | 112 | .224 | 0 | 61 |
| 3B | Denny Lyons | 111 | 456 | 135 | .296 | 6 | 83 |
| OF | Harry Stovey | 130 | 530 | 152 | .287 | 9 | 65 |
| OF | Curt Welch | 136 | 549 | 155 | .282 | 1 | 61 |
| OF | Tom Poorman | 97 | 383 | 87 | .227 | 2 | 44 |

==== Other batters ====
Note: G = Games played; AB = At bats; H = Hits; Avg. = Batting average; HR = Home runs; RBI = Runs batted in

| Player | G | AB | H | Avg. | HR | RBI |
|---|---|---|---|---|---|---|
| George Townsend | 42 | 161 | 25 | .155 | 0 | 12 |
| Mike Sullivan | 28 | 112 | 31 | .277 | 1 | 19 |
| Tom Gunning | 23 | 92 | 18 | .196 | 0 | 5 |
| Blondie Purcell | 18 | 66 | 11 | .167 | 0 | 6 |
| Frank Fennelly | 15 | 47 | 11 | .234 | 1 | 12 |
| Bill Farmer | 3 | 12 | 2 | .167 | 0 | 1 |
| Frank Zinn | 2 | 7 | 0 | .000 | 0 | 0 |
| Whitey Gibson | 1 | 3 | 0 | .000 | 0 | 0 |

=== Pitching ===
==== Starting pitchers ====
Note: G = Games pitched; IP = Innings pitched; W = Wins; L = Losses; ERA = Earned run average; SO = Strikeouts

| Player | G | IP | W | L | ERA | SO |
|---|---|---|---|---|---|---|
| Ed Seward | 57 | 518.2 | 35 | 19 | 2.01 | 272 |
| Gus Weyhing | 47 | 404.0 | 28 | 18 | 2.25 | 204 |
| Mike Mattimore | 26 | 221.0 | 15 | 10 | 3.38 | 80 |
| Bill Blair | 4 | 31.0 | 1 | 3 | 2.61 | 16 |
| Phenomenal Smith | 3 | 22.0 | 2 | 1 | 2.86 | 19 |
| Bob Gamble | 1 | 9.0 | 0 | 1 | 8.00 | 2 |

==== Relief pitchers ====
Note: G = Games pitched; W = Wins; L = Losses; SV = Saves; ERA = Earned run average; SO = Strikeouts

| Player | G | W | L | SV | ERA | SO |
|---|---|---|---|---|---|---|
| Lou Bierbauer | 1 | 0 | 0 | 0 | 0.00 | 3 |
