= 1888 Cleveland Blues season =

1888 Cleveland Blues
- League: American Association
- Ballpark: National League Park
- City: Cleveland, Ohio
- Record: 50–82 (.379)
- League place: 6th
- Owner: Frank Robison
- Managers: Jimmy Williams, Tom Loftus

The 1888 Cleveland Blues baseball team finished with a 50–82 record, sixth place in the American Association.

== Regular season ==
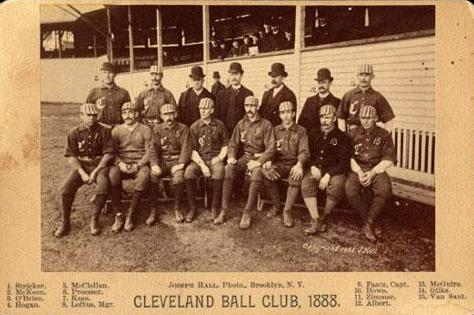
1888 Cleveland Blues

=== Season standings ===
American Association
Team	W	L	Pct.	GB	Home	Road
St. Louis Browns	92	43	.681	—	60‍–‍21	32‍–‍22
Brooklyn Bridegrooms	88	52	.629	6½	53‍–‍20	35‍–‍32
Philadelphia Athletics	81	52	.609	10	55‍–‍20	26‍–‍32
Cincinnati Red Stockings	80	54	.597	11½	56‍–‍25	24‍–‍29
Baltimore Orioles	57	80	.416	36	30‍–‍26	27‍–‍54
Cleveland Blues	50	82	.379	40½	33‍–‍27	17‍–‍55
Louisville Colonels	48	87	.356	44	27‍–‍29	21‍–‍58
Kansas City Cowboys	43	89	.326	47½	23‍–‍34	20‍–‍55

=== Record vs. opponents ===
1888 American Association record Sources:
Team	BAL	BRO	CIN	CLE	KC	LOU	PHA	STL
Baltimore	—	8–12	6–14	10–9	11–8	11–9	5–14	6–14
Brooklyn	12–8	—	14–6–1	16–4	11–9	13–7	12–8–1	10–10–1
Cincinnati	14–6	6–14–1	—	10–7–1	15–4	17–3–1	10–10	8–10
Cleveland	9–10	4–16	7–10–1	—	10–9	9–8–2	7–13	4–16
Kansas City	8–11	9–11	4–15	9–10	—	6–12	3–14	4–16
Louisville	9–11	7–13	3–17–1	8–9–2	12–6	—	5–15–1	4–16
Philadelphia	14–5	8–12–1	10–10	13–7	14–3	15–5–1	—	7–10–1
St. Louis	14–6	10–10–1	10–8	16–4	16–4	16–4	10–7–1	—

=== Roster ===
1888 Cleveland Blues
Roster
Pitchers: Jersey Bakley; Billy Crowell; Ed Keas; Ed Knouff; Mike Morrison; Cinders O'Brien; Doc Oberlander; George Proeser; Bill Stemmyer	Catchers: Deacon McGuire; Pop Snyder; Chief Zimmer; Infielders: Gus Alberts; Jay Faatz; John McGlone; Ed McKean; Cub Stricker; Dick Van Zant	Outfielders: Bob Gilks; Mike Goodfellow; Mortimer Hogan; Pete Hotaling; Bill McClellan	Manager: Tom Loftus; Jimmy Williams

== Player stats ==
=== Batting ===
==== Starters by position ====
Note: Pos = Position; G = Games played; AB = At bats; H = Hits; Avg. = Batting average; HR = Home runs; RBI = Runs batted in

Pos	Player	G	AB	H	Avg.	HR	RBI
C	Pop Snyder	64	237	51	.215	0	14
1B	Jay Faatz	120	470	124	.264	0	51
2B	Cub Stricker	127	493	115	.233	1	33
SS	Ed McKean	131	548	164	.299	6	68
3B	John McGlone	55	203	37	.182	1	22
OF	Pete Hotaling	98	403	101	.251	0	55
OF	Bob Gilks	119	484	111	.229	1	63
OF	Mortimer Hogan	78	269	61	.227	0	24

==== Other batters ====
Note: G = Games played; AB = At bats; H = Hits; Avg. = Batting average; HR = Home runs; RBI = Runs batted in

Player	G	AB	H	Avg.	HR	RBI
Gus Alberts	102	364	75	.206	1	48
Mike Goodfellow	68	269	66	.245	0	29
Chief Zimmer	65	212	51	.241	0	22
Deacon McGuire	26	94	24	.255	1	13
Bill McClellan	22	72	16	.222	0	5
Dick Van Zant	10	31	8	.258	0	1

=== Pitching ===
==== Starting pitchers ====
Note: G = Games pitched; IP = Innings pitched; W = Wins; L = Losses; ERA = Earned run average; SO = Strikeouts

Player	G	IP	W	L	ERA	SO
Jersey Bakley	61	532.2	25	33	2.97	212
Cinders O'Brien	30	259.0	11	19	3.30	135
Billy Crowell	18	150.2	5	13	5.79	61
George Proeser	7	59.0	3	4	3.81	20
Ed Keas	6	51.0	3	3	2.29	18
Mike Morrison	4	35.0	1	3	5.40	14
Doc Oberlander	3	25.2	1	2	5.26	23
Bill Stemmyer	2	16.0	0	2	9.00	7
Ed Knouff	2	9.0	0	1	1.00	2

==== Other pitchers ====
Note: G = Games pitched: IP = Innings pitched; W = Wins; L = Losses; ERA = Earned run average; SO = Strikeouts

Player	G	IP	W	L	ERA	SO
Bob Gilks	4	21.0	0	2	8.14	3

==== Relief pitchers ====
Note: G = Games pitched; W = Wins; L = Losses; SV = Saves; ERA = Earned run average; SO = Strikeouts

Player	G	W	L	SV	ERA	SO
Cub Stricker	2	1	0	0	4.50	5
