= George Chauncey (executive) =

American business executive and professional baseball team part-owner

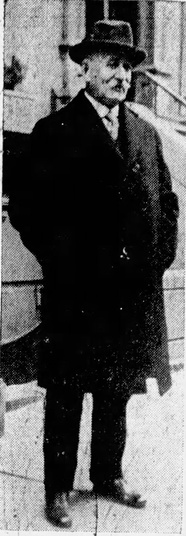
- Born: April 17, 1847; Brooklyn, New York, U.S.
- Died: April 16, 1926 (aged 78); Brooklyn, New York, U.S.
- Occupations: Executive in banking and real estate; Owner of Brooklyn Ward's Wonders (PL) (1890); Part-owner of the Brooklyn Grooms (NL) (1891–1896)
- Spouse: Adelaide Chauncey née Sheldon
- Children: 3

George Washington Chauncey (April 17, 1847 – April 16, 1926) was an American business executive in banking and real estate. He was also an owner in professional baseball, owning a franchise during the only season of the Players' League, 1890, and being an early part-owner of the team that would become the Brooklyn Dodgers, during 1891–1896.

== Biography ==
Chauncey was a native of Brooklyn, New York, and a baseball fan. He got into the sport by financing the formation of a team in the Players' League of 1890 that became known as Brooklyn Ward's Wonders, named for manager and shortstop John Montgomery Ward. Chauncey also financed the construction of a stadium for the Wonders in Brownsville, called Eastern Park. The team and the league lasted only one season. In 1891, Chauncey arranged a merger of his team with the National League's Brooklyn Grooms. The deal saw him accumulate a large share of the Grooms stock and he convinced the other owners to leave their previous home at Washington Park for his facility at Eastern Park. He also insisted that manager Bill McGunnigle, who had just won two league championships, be fired and replaced with Ward, which the other owners, desperate for his cash, agreed to.

Chauncey's time as owner of the Brooklyn team came to an end in 1897 when he sold his shares in the team to the other owners Ferdinand Abell and Charles Byrne.

Chauncey had multiple business interests in banking and real estate, including being president of a bank from 1902 to 1914 then chairman until his death, and was president of a real estate company. He was a Freemason and an avid angler. Born in 1847, Chauncey died in 1926 following a two-week battle with pneumonia, on the day before his 79th birthday. He was interred at Green-Wood Cemetery in Brooklyn, and was survived by his wife and three children.
