= On-base percentage =

Hitting statistic in baseball

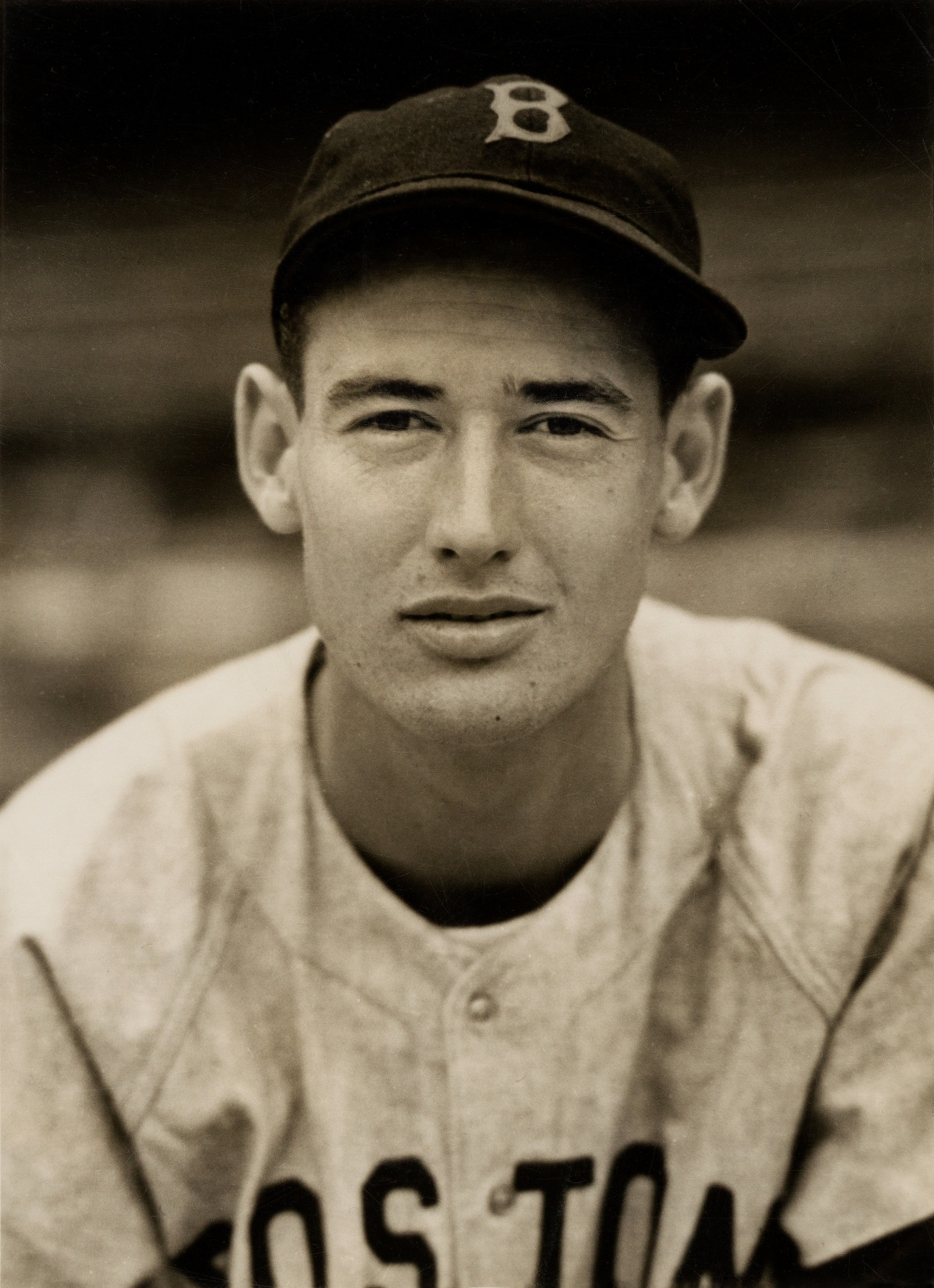
Ted Williams is the all-time Major League Baseball leader in on-base percentage.

In baseball statistics, on-base percentage (OBP) measures how frequently a batter reaches base. An official Major League Baseball (MLB) statistic since 1984, it is sometimes referred to as on-base average (OBA), (Note: Not to be confused with opponents' batting average (OBA), more commonly known as batting average against (BAA).) as it is rarely presented as a true percentage.

Generally defined as "how frequently a batter reaches base per plate appearance", OBP is specifically calculated as the ratio of a batter's times on base (the sum of hits, bases on balls, and times hit by pitch) to the sum of at bats, bases on balls, hit by pitch, and sacrifice flies. OBP does not credit the batter for reaching base on fielding errors, fielder's choice, uncaught third strikes, fielder's obstruction, or catcher's interference, and deducts from plate appearances a batter intentionally giving himself up in a sacrifice bunt.

OBP is added to slugging average (SLG) to determine on-base plus slugging (OPS).

The OBP of all batters faced by one pitcher or team is referred to as "on-base against".

On-base percentage is calculable for professional teams dating back to the first year of National Association of Professional Base Ball Players competition in 1871, because the component values of its formula have been recorded in box scores ever since.

== History ==
The statistic was invented in the late 1940s by Brooklyn Dodgers statistician Allan Roth with then-Dodgers general manager Branch Rickey. In 1954, Rickey, who was then the general manager of the Pittsburgh Pirates, was featured in a Life Magazine graphic in which the formula for on-base percentage was shown as the first component of an all-encompassing "offense" equation. However, it was not named as on-base percentage, and there is little evidence that Roth's statistic was taken seriously at the time by the baseball community at large.

On-base percentage became an official MLB statistic in 1984. Its perceived importance jumped after the influential 2003 book Moneyball highlighted Oakland Athletics general manager Billy Beane's focus on the statistic. Many baseball observers, particularly those influenced by the field of sabermetrics, now consider on-base percentage superior to the statistic traditionally used to measure offensive skill, batting average, which accounts for hits but ignores other ways a batter can reach base.

== Overview ==
Traditionally, players with the best on-base percentages bat as leadoff hitter, unless they are power hitters, who traditionally bat slightly lower in the batting order. The league average for on-base percentage in Major League Baseball has varied considerably over time; at its peak in the late 1990s, it was around .340, whereas it was typically .300 during the dead-ball era. On-base percentage can also vary quite considerably from player to player. The highest career OBP of a batter with more than 3,000 plate appearances is .482 by Ted Williams. The lowest is by Bill Bergen, who had an OBP of .194.

On-base percentage is calculated using this formula:

$$OBP = \frac{H+BB+HBP}{AB+BB+HBP+SF}$$

where

- H = Hits
- BB = Bases on Balls (Walks)
- HBP = Hit By Pitch
- AB = At bat
- SF = Sacrifice fly

In certain unofficial calculations, the denominator is simplified and replaced by Plate Appearance (PA); however, the calculation of PAs includes certain infrequent events that will slightly lower the calculated OBP (i.e. catcher's interference, and sacrifice bunts). Sacrifice bunts are excluded from consideration on the basis that they are usually imposed by the manager with the expectation that the batter will not reach base, and thus do not accurately reflect the batter's ability to reach base when attempting to do so. This is in contrast with the sacrifice fly, which is generally unintentional; the batter was trying for a hit.

=== All-time leaders ===
#	Player	OBP	Team(s)	Year(s)
1	Ted Williams	.4817	Boston Red Sox	1939–1942, 1946–1960
2	Babe Ruth	.4740	Boston Red Sox, New York Yankees, Boston Braves	1914–1935
3	John McGraw	.4657	Baltimore Orioles, St. Louis Cardinals, New York Giants	1891–1906
4	Billy Hamilton	.4552	Kansas City Cowboys, Philadelphia Phillies, Boston Beaneaters	1888–1901
5	Lou Gehrig	.4474	New York Yankees	1923–1939
6	Barry Bonds	.4443	Pittsburgh Pirates, San Francisco Giants	1986–2007
7	Bill Joyce	.4349	Brooklyn Ward's Wonders, Boston Reds, Brooklyn Grooms, Washington Senators, New York Giants	1890–1898
8	Rogers Hornsby	.4337	St. Louis Cardinals, New York Giants, Boston Braves, Chicago Cubs, St. Louis Browns	1915–1937
9	Ty Cobb	.4330	Detroit Tigers, Philadelphia Athletics	1905–1928
10	Jimmie Foxx	.4283	Philadelphia Athletics, Boston Red Sox, Chicago Cubs, Philadelphia Phillies	1925–1942, 1944–1945
11	Tris Speaker	.4279	Boston Red Sox, Cleveland Indians, Washington Senators, Philadelphia Athletics	1907–1928
12	Eddie Collins	.4244	Philadelphia Athletics, Chicago White Sox	1906–1930

=== Single-season leaders ===
#	Player	OBP	Team	Year
1	Barry Bonds	.6094	San Francisco Giants	2004
2	Barry Bonds	.5817	San Francisco Giants	2002
3	Ted Williams	.5528	Boston Red Sox	1941
4	John McGraw	.5475	Baltimore Orioles	1899
5	Babe Ruth	.5445	New York Yankees	1923
6	Babe Ruth	.5319	New York Yankees	1920
7	Barry Bonds	.5291	San Francisco Giants	2003
8	Ted Williams	.5256	Boston Red Sox	1957
9	Billy Hamilton	.5209	Philadelphia Phillies	1894
10	Babe Ruth	.5156	New York Yankees	1926

== See also ==
- List of Major League Baseball career on-base percentage leaders
- Moneyball: The Art of Winning an Unfair Game
