= Ed Andrews =

American baseball player (1859–1934)

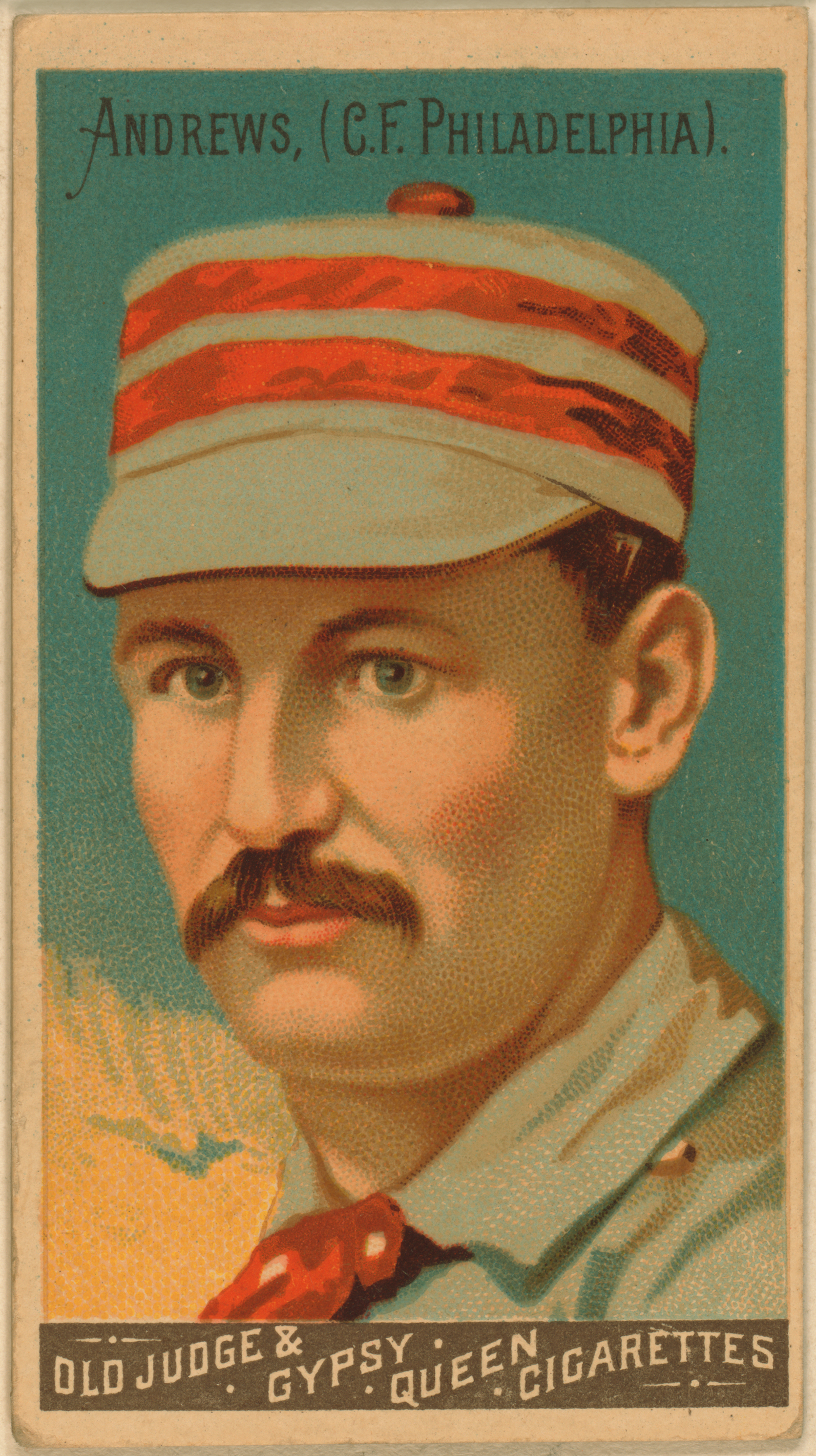
- Outfielder
- Born: April 5, 1859; Painesville, Ohio, U.S.
- Died: August 12, 1934 (aged 75); West Palm Beach, Florida, U.S.
- Batted: Right Threw: Right

MLB debut
- May 1, 1884, for the Philadelphia Quakers

Last MLB appearance
- July 26, 1891, for the Cincinnati Kelly's Killers

MLB statistics
- Batting average: .257
- Hits: 830
- Stolen bases: 205
- Games played: 774
- Stats at Baseball Reference

Teams
- Philadelphia Quakers (1884–1889); Indianapolis Hoosiers (1889); Brooklyn Ward's Wonders (1890); Cincinnati Kelly's Killers (1891)

Career highlights and awards
- NL stolen base leader (1886)

George Edward Andrews (April 5, 1859 – August 12, 1934) was an American professional baseball player. He was a right-handed second baseman and outfielder over parts of eight seasons (1884–1891) with the Philadelphia Quakers, Indianapolis Hoosiers, Brooklyn Ward's Wonders and Cincinnati Kelly's Killers. He was the National League stolen base champion in 1886 with Philadelphia. For his career, he compiled a .257 batting average, with 278 RBIs, 602 runs scored, and 205 stolen bases.

== Early life ==
Eddy Andrews was born in Painesville, Ohio. His father had been a boat captain on the Great Lakes. Andrews was an alumnus of Western Reserve University (now Case Western Reserve University). He was a member of Delta Kappa Epsilon fraternity.

== Playing career ==
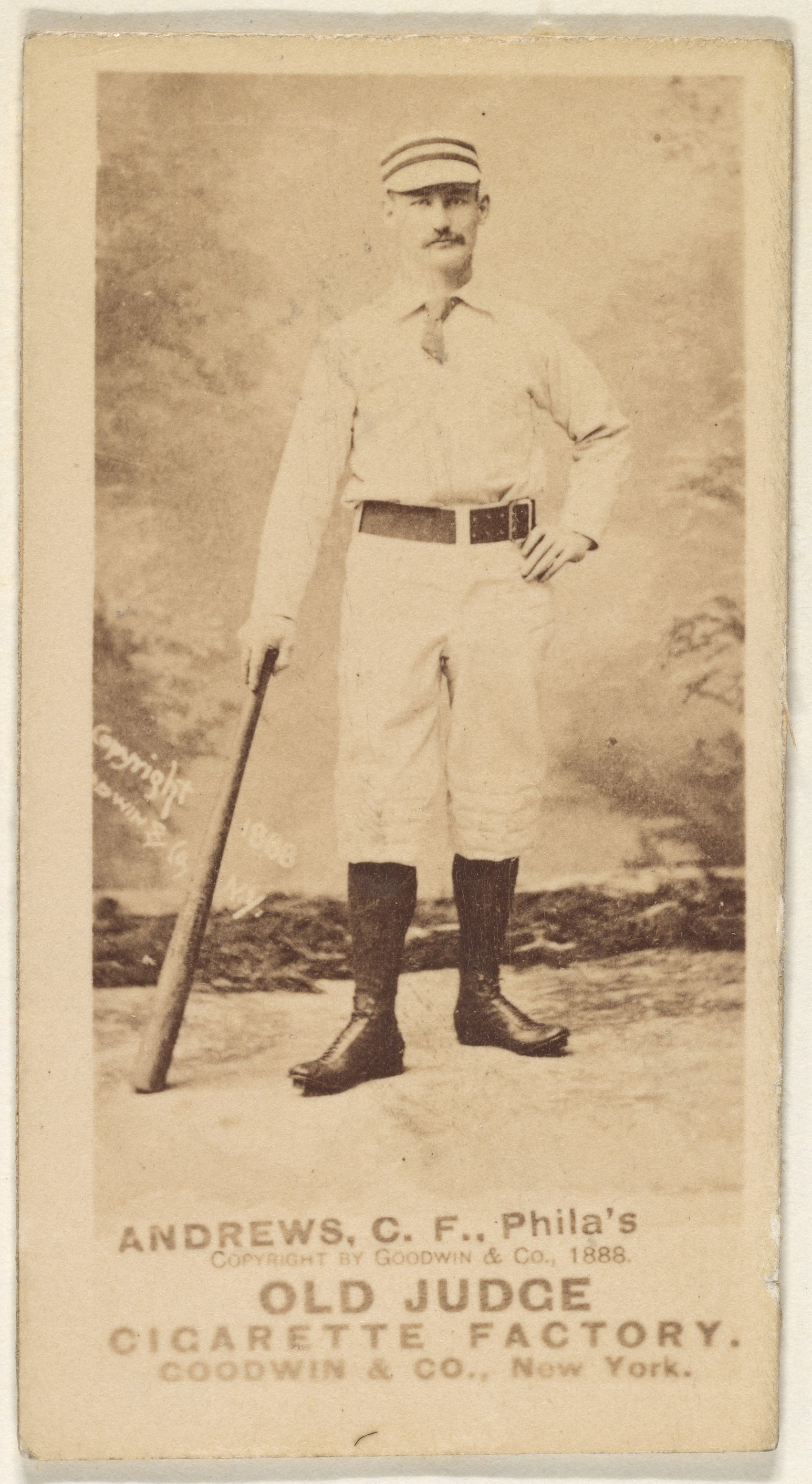
George Edward "Ed" Andrews, 1888, Metropolitan Museum of Art

Andrews played for the Philadelphia Quakers of the NL between 1884 and 1889. In 1886, the first year in which the stolen base was recorded, Andrews led the NL in the category. He married Mary Frances Kirby in 1888; she was friends with the daughters of Harry Wright, who was Andrews' manager in Philadelphia. In August 1889, he was purchased by the NL's Indianapolis Hoosiers.

Andrews was involved in the Brotherhood of Professional Base-Ball Players, which was the first professional sports players union. The Brotherhood created the Players' League (PL) before the 1890 season; the league tried to compete with the NL as a major baseball league. Andrews played for the PL's Brooklyn Ward's Wonders. Other than John Montgomery Ward (the player who organized the PL), Andrews was the only player to own shares in the team. The league folded after a single season.

In 1891, Andrews' last year as a major league player, he participated in the final season of another league, the American Association. Andrews played for the league's Cincinnati Kelly's Killers until the team released him at the end of July. Andrews' release may have been precipitated by difficulties with manager King Kelly.

== After retirement ==
In January 1892, newspapers reported that Andrews was growing pineapples on his land near the Indian River in Fort Pierce, Florida, and that he had received some baseball contract offers. He was said to be ignoring the contract offers and planning to have 50,000 pineapples ready for the upcoming season. At one point, he was neighbors with Emmett Seery, another college-educated former baseball player who raised pineapples.

When the Great Freeze devastated Florida citrus crops in 1895, Andrews returned to baseball, taking up umpiring in the NL. In July 1895, Andrews was recovering from a broken ankle that occurred when he was struck by a batted ball. In 1898, Andrews was credited with authoring a code of rules for NL umpires, but The Wilkes-Barre Record wrote that the credit should have gone to Henry Chadwick. Andrews resigned as an umpire in July 1899.

In the late 1890s, when entrepreneur Henry Flagler created two teams of black baseball players to entertain guests at his two hotels in Palm Beach, Florida, he hired Andrews to run the baseball operations. In 1916, he was a traveling business manager for the Boston Braves.

Andrews died in West Palm Beach at the age of 75.

== See also ==
- List of Major League Baseball annual stolen base leaders
