= Tom Kinslow =

American baseball player (1866–1901)

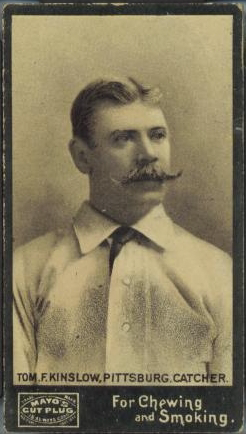
- Catcher
- Born: January 12, 1866; Washington, D.C., U.S.
- Died: February 22, 1901 (aged 35); Washington, D.C., U.S.
- Batted: Right Threw: Right

MLB debut
- June 4, 1886, for the Washington Nationals

Last MLB appearance
- September 3, 1898, for the St. Louis Browns

MLB statistics
- Batting average: .266
- Home runs: 12
- Runs batted in: 222
- Stats at Baseball Reference

Teams
- Washington Nationals (1886); New York Metropolitans (1887); Brooklyn Ward's Wonders (1890); Brooklyn Bridegrooms (1891–1894); Pittsburgh Pirates (1895); Louisville Colonels (1896); Washington Senators (1898); St. Louis Browns (1898)

Thomas F. Kinslow (January 12, 1866 – February 22, 1901) was an American professional baseball player who played catcher in Major League Baseball (MLB) from 1886 until 1898. He played for eight teams in his ten-season career. Four of those seasons were with Brooklyn Bridegrooms of the National League (NL). During his playing days, his height was listed at 5-foot-10-inch (1.78 m), his weight as 160-pound (73 kg), he batted and threw right-handed, and had blonde hair.

He was a member of the Washington Light Infantry, a local Washington, D.C. militia, and played in many of their amateur baseball games throughout his life. When not playing, he tended to his bar. Noted for being a genial, friendly individual, he was quick to make friends, and was a fan-favorite in his hometown of Washington, D.C. Kinslow was a heavy drinker however, which caused him to miss games and team movements on occasion. Late into his career, these alcohol issues were much less tolerated, eventually hastening his exit from the game. He died at the age of 35, after a year-long battle with tuberculosis.

== Early life ==
Thomas Kinslow was born on January 12, 1866 in Washington, D.C.; his father Michael worked as a laborer and an ice dealer, later working in the oyster business. He began playing amateur baseball in the city's first ward on a team known as the "Quicks", as well as a team named the Falcons. He later became a member of the Washington Light Infantry, Company C, a local militia, and played as their catcher against the 5th Maryland Regiment on June 29, 1885; a game won by Washington 11–7.

== Baseball career ==
=== Early career ===
Kinslow made his MLB debut with the Washington Nationals of the NL on June 4, 1886 as their starting catcher. He injured his finger in the third inning trying to catch a bad pitch thrown by Bob Barr, and had to leave the game. On June 15, he was again injured by a Barr pitch, and forced to leave the game with a dislocated finger. He played in three games for the Nationals in 1886, collecting two hits in eight at bats.

In 1887, he was signed by the Peanut Eaters of the Pennsylvania State Association, and played in 36 games before being sold to the Detroit Wolverines of the NL, along with Ed Beatin for $1,000 on July 27. Soon, the deal was put on hold by the NL, as the Cincinnati Red Stockings of the American Association (AA) also claimed they had a deal in place for these players. On September 6, an arbitration board for the NL and AA leagues convened to render their findings. They found that Detroit's contract with the players was dated on July 20, which superseded Cincinnati's contract that was signed on July 27, and awarded Detroit the players. Detroit then sold their contracts with the players to the London Tecumsehs of the International Association. Though he did not play for London in 1887, he did play in two games for the New York Metropolitans of the AA, going hitless in eight at bats.

=== Brooklyn ===
Kinslow played the next two seasons for the Tecumsehs, and had a batting average of .200 in 1888, but improved it to .343 in 1889. In 1890, a new league was created, the Players' League (PL), and he signed with Ward's Wonders of Brooklyn. During the season, he had a batting average of .264, and caught 64 games. On June 28, he hit the first home run of his career in a game against Henry Gruber and the Cleveland Infants. Later, on July 11, he hit two home runs in the same game off of George Keefe of the Buffalo Bisons, the only time Kinslow would achieve this feat.

The PL folded following the 1890 season, and Kinslow stayed in Brooklyn by signing with the Brooklyn Bridegrooms of the NL. He followed John Montgomery Ward, who was hired as team's new manager. Shortly afterwards, Kinslow's services were kept exclusive as the team listed him among those players covered under the reserve clause. During the game on July 8, Kinslow was benched by Ward for what was described as insubordination. Kinslow played in 61 games for Brooklyn in 1891, being platooned primarily at catcher with Con Daily, and had a .237 batting average.

In 1892, he continued to platoon with Daily and played in 66 games. He improved his batting average to .305, and hit two home runs. With a third catcher, Tom Daly, no longer with the team in 1893, Kinslow's playing time increased slightly to 78 games. His batting average dropped to .244, but he tied his career-high with four home runs. Although he was a popular player during his time in Brooklyn, Kinslow had caused trouble with the team at some point in the season, and had been restricted from playing in home games by owner Charles Byrne. Upon signing his contract with Brooklyn in 1894, Kinslow wrote a letter to the owner apologizing for his conduct during the previous season, and vowed to improve significantly going forward. His batting average improved to .305 during the 1894 season while playing in 62 games, sharing time with Daily once again.

=== Late career ===
On January 26, 1895, Kinslow was traded by Brooklyn to the Pittsburgh Pirates for Ad Gumbert. The Red Stockings quickly disputed the deal however, claiming that they had an earlier agreement with Pittsburgh's manager Connie Mack that would have brought them Gumbert and Buck Weaver in exchange for Billy Merritt. Despite the dispute, the Brooklyn deal went forward, and Kinslow joined the Pirates. With the catching duties being split between Merritt and Joe Sugden, there was little playing time allotted for Kinslow; Kinslow's behavior had become a problem for Mack and the Pirates. Once, he was fined for missing a game due to drinking, and in late May, he was suspended for failing to show up for a game in Washington, D.C. On June 22, he failed to be ready for a road series, and was released from the team for disorderly conduct. Kinslow expressed sorrow and shock over getting released, claiming that while he drank too much, Brooklyn would issue fines for his behavior instead. In 19 games played for Pittsburgh, he had a .226 batting average, Though he had received interest from Cincinnati and the Washington Senators, he claimed that he wanted to take the remainder the year off to be ready for the next season.

During the off-season, Kinslow tended to the bar he owned in Washington, D.C., mainly passing time opening oysters and clams, and playing games for the Washington Light Infantry. On May 21, it was reported that he had agreed to play for the Louisville Colonels of the NL. In eight games for the Colonels, Kinslow collected seven hits in 25 at bats for a .280 batting average. After playing very little in 1896, and not at all in 1897, he signed with the Senators for the 1898 season. He admitted that his weight had increased to 225 lbs during the time off from the game, but would quickly drop his weight to 160 once he began playing. He appeared in three games for Washington until he was sold to the St. Louis Browns on August 18. He played in an additional 14 games for St. Louis, and was released from the team at the conclusion of the season. In his 380 career games played, he had a .266 batting average, 12 home runs, and 222 runs batted in.

== Personal life ==
Kinslow was known to have a genial, sunny disposition, and was quick to make friends. In the 1900 United States census, he was living with his father and working as an oyster dealer. He is listed as being married for ten years, but his wife was not living in the same home. He died in his hometown of Washington, D.C. after a year-long battle with consumption (tuberculosis), and is interred at Congressional Cemetery.
