= Dave Orr =

American baseball player (1859–1915)

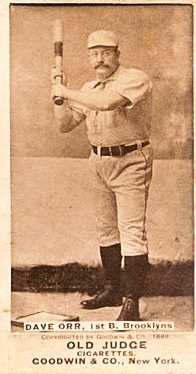
- First baseman
- Born: September 29, 1859; New York City, New York, U.S.
- Died: June 2, 1915 (aged 55); Richmond Hill, New York, U.S.
- Batted: Right Threw: Right

MLB debut
- May 17, 1883, for the New York Metropolitans

Last MLB appearance
- October 2, 1890, for the Brooklyn Ward's Wonders

MLB statistics
- Batting average: .342
- Runs scored: 536
- Runs batted in: 627
- Stats at Baseball Reference

Teams
- New York Metropolitans (1883–1887); New York Gothams (1883); Brooklyn Bridegrooms (1888); Columbus Solons (1889); Brooklyn Ward's Wonders (1890)

Career highlights and awards
- American Association batting champion (1884); American Association RBI champion (1884); 2× American Association hits leader (1884, 1886); 2× American Association triples leader (1885, 1886)

David L. Orr (September 29, 1859 – June 2, 1915) was an American first baseman in Major League Baseball from 1883 through 1890. Orr played most of his career in the American Association for the New York Metropolitans (1883–1887), Brooklyn Bridegrooms (1888) and Columbus Solons (1889). He also played for the New York Gothams in the National League for one game in 1883 and for the Brooklyn Ward's Wonders of the Players' League in 1890.

Orr was one of the best hitters in baseball during his major league career. He never hit below .305 for a full season, and his career batting average of .342 is the eleventh highest in major league history and the third highest for a right-handed hitter. He was also regarded as the hardest-hitting batsman of his era. His 31 triples in 1886 set a major league record that stood for 25 years; the mark has since been surpassed only once, by Chief Wilson in 1912.

He was also the first batter to compile more than 300 total bases in a season, and he was the first player with at least 3,000 plate appearances to retire with a slugging percentage above .500 (.502).

Despite his weight (250 pounds at 5 ft 11 in (1.80 m)), Orr was also a solid defensive performer with a .973 fielding percentage. He twice led the American Association in range factor by a first baseman. In 1886, he led the Association's first basemen in putouts and fielding percentage, and in 1889 he led in assists with 61. Orr hit .371 in 1890, but his career was cut short by a stroke suffered during an exhibition game at the end of the 1890 season.

== Early life ==
Orr was born in Brooklyn, New York, in 1859. His father was an Irish immigrant who worked as a brownstone stonecutter. Orr grew up in Brooklyn and began his baseball career playing for minor league teams, including the Brooklyn Alaskas and teams in Newark, New Jersey, and Hartford, Connecticut.

== Professional baseball ==
=== New York Gothams ===
In 1883, Orr signed with the New York Gothams of the National League. He made his major league debut with the Gothams on May 17, 1883. He played in only one game for the Gothams and was then transferred to the New York Metropolitans. Both teams were under common ownership by the Metropolitan Exhibition Company.

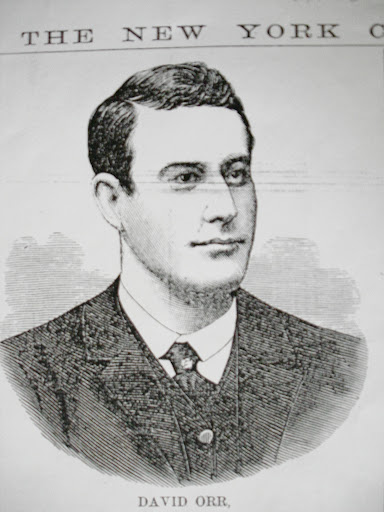

=== New York Metropolitans ===
Orr spent most of his career with the New York Metropolitans of the American Association. He joined the Metropolitans during the 1883 season and served as the team's first baseman through the 1887 season.

==== 1884 season ====
In 1884, Orr's first complete season in the major leagues, he had arguably the best year of his career. He won the American Association batting crown with a .354 batting average and also led the association with 112 runs batted in (RBI), 162 hits, and 247 total bases. Despite hitting a career high nine home runs, Orr narrowly missed a Triple Crown as Long John Reilly hit 11 home runs.

==== 1885 season ====
In his second full season in the major leagues, Orr compiled a .342 batting average, 56 extra base hits, and 241 total bases, ranking second in the American Association in all three categories. He led the association with a .543 slugging percentage, 21 triples, and a 5.5 offensive wins above replacement (WAR) rating. On June 12, 1885 Orr hit for the cycle for the first time in his career; he accomplished the feat again on August 10, 1887.

==== 1886 season ====
In 1886, had career highs with 136 games, 593 plate appearances, 93 runs, 31 triples, and 301 total bases. His .338 batting average was the third best in the American Association, and he became the first player to reach 300 total bases in a season. He led the association in hits (193), total bases (301), extra base hits (63), triples (31), slugging percentage (.527). His 31 triples was a major league record for 25 years (it remains the second highest in major league history). Orr also had the highest offensive WAR rating (5.4) and the highest overall WAR rating (6.3) among position players in the American Association.

Orr also had an excellent season as a fielder in 1886. He led the association's first basemen in fielding percentage (.981), putouts (1,445), assists (61), and range factor (10.88). Despite Orr's contributions, the Metropolitans finished seventh in the American Association with a 53–82 record.

==== 1887 season ====
In 1887, despite multiple injuries, Orr had another fine season. His .338 batting average was third best in the American Association. In April 1887, Orr sustained serious injuries and reported to be in critical condition after colliding with catcher Andy Sommers, as both players were pursuing a batted ball. Orr's injuries included a dislocated knee, a badly bruised breast, his front teeth broken off, his tongue bitten through, and hemorrhaging. He remained out of the lineup until the middle of May.

The Metropolitans started the 1887 record with a 6–24 record. On June 2, 1887, the manager was fired, and Orr took over on an interim basis as player-manager and captain. In his first game as manager on June 3, 1887, Orr had to be carried off the field after a blood vessel in his leg burst while sliding into second base.

=== Miscellaneous ===
Orr used an unorthodox batting stance that was described by one newspaper reporter as follows:

"Big Dave Orr has a position which seems utterly at variance with all the rules of batting. Instead of standing in the center of the plate he takes his place at the extreme edge furthest from the pitcher and almost behind it, in fact. His feet are placed in a most peculiar way. The toes of the right foot point almost toward second base, and the heel is placed in the hollow of the left. He swings his body forward, moving his feet but a few inches, all the swing he gives his bat seeming to come from the upper part of his body."

During the off-season, Orr worked as a butcher and a brownstone cutter.

=== Brooklyn Bridegrooms ===
On October 20, 1887, Orr was sold to the Brooklyn Bridegrooms along with seven other players. He signed a contract with Brooklyn the following month. Orr appeared in 99 games for the 1888 Brooklyn team and had the fifth highest batting average (.305) in the American Association. He was also among the league leaders in fielding percentage, assists by a third baseman, and fielding runs. Brooklyn finished the 1888 season in second place in the American Association with a record of 88–52. In December 1888, the Bridegrooms sold Orr and Al Mays to the Columbus Solons for $3,000. In January 1889, Sporting Life published a poem about Orr, which went as follows:

To Dave Orr — Brooklyn's Lament

What! Big Dave Orr gone?

No, no! He, who, with smiling face,

Has so often set the pace

For the Brooklyns in the pennant race.

It's not possible he has gone.

Who'll take the place of our genial Dave?

He, who with a mighty wave,

With his great big stave,

Would the sphere so smite,

With 'Herculean' might.

Who'll take the place of Dave?

...
Oh! Columbus, you've got our Dave;

You have got a jewel whose immense worth

Is as great as his girth.

And may his shadow know no waste,

And remain as great as his waist.

Wherever you are, 'success attend you, Dave.'

=== Columbus Solons ===
Orr appeared in 134 games for the Columbus Solons in 1889. His .327 batting average was the fourth best in the American Association, and he was also among the association's leaders in hits (183), total bases (250), doubles (31), triples (12), and RBIs (87). Although playing for Columbus, Orr helped Brooklyn win the 1889 American Association pennant. On the last day of the season, Brooklyn needed St. Louis to lose in order to win the pennant. Columbus played St. Louis in that final game of the season, and Orr came to bat with the score tied and two outs in the bottom of the ninth inning. With four balls and two strikes having been called, Orr hit a home run that Hugh Fullerton later wrote was "perhaps the most historic hit ever made." Fullerton described the situation as follows:

"There was a situation for fair – one to dream about! One ball to decide a pennant! The pitcher heaved up the ball and Orr swung. There was a crack and the ball started toward the city. It crossed the right center field fence still going higher. It crossed the canal, hit just above the second-story window of a cottage, bounded and rolled up an alley – and Comiskey's men yielded the pennant."

Orr reportedly hit the historic home run against St. Louis with the bat that he famously named "Charlotte." Orr had three bats that he had named Charlotte, Gertrude, and Rose. Charlotte was his favorite, and a sports writer later recalled "the big fellow certainly could clout the ball when she was in his hands."

=== Brooklyn Ward's Wonders ===
On January 22, 1890, Orr signed with the Brooklyn Ward's Wonders in the newly formed Players' League. Orr helped lead Brooklyn to second place in the league with a 76–56 record. In June 1890, Orr became the first Brooklyn player to hit the ball over the left field fence at Eastern Park. On June 17, 1890, Orr had two ribs broken when he was hit by a pitch, "but continued to play until he was threatened with erysipelas." Though he had been expected to miss the remainder of the 1890 season, he returned to the lineup on July 7. Orr batted .359 in 48 games before the injury and improved to .397 in 59 games after the injury. He finished second in a close race with Pete Browning for the batting championship. In early September 1890, Sporting Life observed: "Big Dave Orr is batting like great guns, and is keeping the leader, Browning, guessing. How the two must watch for each other's score day after day!"

Despite appearing in only 107 games in 1890 and still ranked among the Players' League leaders in batting average (.371), RBIs (124), slugging percentage (.534), hits (172), total bases (248), and doubles (32). He also led the league with an at bat to strikeout ratio of 42.2.

=== Stroke ===
In September 1890, Orr sustained a stroke while playing in an exhibition game in Renovo, Pennsylvania. He was paralyzed on his left side, but by January 1891, he was reportedly "able to walk out on pleasant days."

In September 1891, 4,000 tickets were sold for "a grand benefit picnic" held in Orr's honor at Euler's Washington Park, the home of the Brooklyn baseball club. Former teammates, including John Montgomery Ward attended, and the park was lit with Chinese lanterns, a marching band led a parade, and a dance platform was "festooned with flags." A newspaper account stated that "Dave's big right hand finally grew tired of wagging. His left was there, too, but it has not done duty for almost a year and this is why he was given a picnic."

In March 1892, Orr traveled to Florida to umpire exhibition games. He announced that, although one leg was still "somewhat affected by paralysis", he was contemplating a comeback in 1893. He was not able to return to the game as a player.

=== Accolades ===
Though largely forgotten in the modern era, Orr was remembered by both fellow players and sports writers as one of the greatest hitters of the 19th century. In 1894, Baseball Hall of Fame inductee Dan Brouthers opined that Orr was the greatest hitter to ever play the game:

"The greatest hitter that ever played ball was old Dave Orr. He didn't care whether they were over the plate or not. If they were within reach of that long bat of his he would hit them out, and when he hit them there was no telling whether they would be found again or not. I have always held that Dave Orr was the strongest and best hitter that ever played ball."

Pitcher Silver King broke his wrist when he was struck with a ball hit by Orr. He later recalled: "Dave could crack 'em at you like a shot, and the one I stopped had all of Dave's 200-pound (91 kg) avoirdupois good and hard up against it."

In 1898, the editor of Sporting Life recalled Orr once hitting a ball over the fence (400 feet (120 m) from home plate) and wrote: "Dave Orr, that broad chested, good-natured big chap, who once held down a place on the Brooklyn team, in his day was the hardest hitting batsman in League or Association. I have seen him wallop a ball so far over the outfielders' heads that it took a search warrant to get it back again, and every third baseman crossed himself and muttered the last prayers of the dying whenever he stalked to the plate." Years later, another account in Sporting Life observed: "He was a mighty slugger and his home-run drives earned him the reputation of being the greatest batter in the world."

In his eight-season career, Orr posted a .342 batting average (1125-for-3289) with 37 home runs and 627 RBI in 791 games. He added 536 runs, 198 doubles, 108 triples and 66 stolen bases.

== Later years ==
While Orr was not able to resume his playing career, he remained active in baseball in other capacities. He worked for many years as a gate-keeper at the Polo Grounds in Upper Manhattan, then as caretaker at Ebbets Field in 1913, and finally managing the press box at Washington Park (home field of the Brooklyn Tip-Tops) from 1914 until the time of his death.

Orr died at his niece's home at 1211 Stoothoff Avenue (modern-day 114th Street) in the Richmond Hill section of the New York City borough of Queens in June 1915. His funeral was held on June 4, 1915 at Woodlawn Cemetery in The Bronx. On learning of Orr's death, Brooklyn sports writer Abe Yager wrote: "Dave Orr is no more. A finer soul never breathed in any walk of life and he was a credit to the profession. In a talk on general subjects the last time he was in the press box at Washington Park, the veteran remarked that he never said anything derogatory against anybody, and that was true. The writer knew him 25 years and never heard him say a harsh word to anybody."

== See also ==
- List of Major League Baseball player-managers
- List of Major League Baseball annual runs batted in leaders
- List of Major League Baseball annual triples leaders
- List of Major League Baseball triples records
- List of Major League Baseball career triples leaders
- List of Major League Baseball players to hit for the cycle
- List of Major League Baseball single-game hits leaders

Achievements
Preceded by Jim O'Rourke; Tip O'Neill	Hitting for the cycle June 12, 1885; August 10, 1887	Succeeded by George Wood; Bid McPhee
