= Mike Sullivan (outfielder) =

American baseball player (1860–1929)

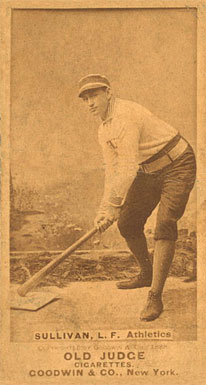
- Outfielder
- Born: March 10, 1860; Webster, Massachusetts, U.S.
- Died: June 16, 1929 (aged 69); Webster, Massachusetts, U.S.
- Batted: Right Threw: Right

MLB debut
- April 26, 1888, for the Philadelphia Athletics

Last MLB appearance
- June 20, 1888, for the Philadelphia Athletics

MLB statistics
- Batting average: .277
- Home runs: 1
- Runs batted in: 19
- Stats at Baseball Reference

Teams
- Philadelphia Athletics (1888)

Michael Joseph Sullivan (March 10, 1860 – June 16, 1929) was an American Major League Baseball player. He appeared in 28 games for the Philadelphia Athletics of the American Association, mostly in the outfield.

== Sources ==
- Career statistics from Baseball Reference · Baseball Reference (Minors) · Retrosheet · Baseball Almanac

MLB
