= Bob Gilks =

American baseball player (1864–1944)

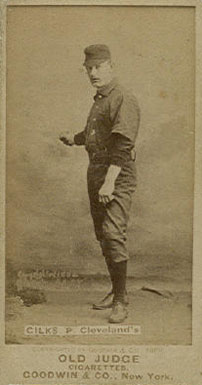
- Outfielder
- Born: July 2, 1864; Cincinnati, Ohio, U.S.
- Died: August 24, 1944 (aged 80); Brunswick, Georgia, U.S.
- Batted: Right Threw: Right

MLB debut
- August 25, 1887, for the Cleveland Blues

Last MLB appearance
- September 18, 1893, for the Baltimore Orioles

MLB statistics
- Batting average: .231
- Hits: 320
- Runs batted in: 142
- Stats at Baseball Reference

Teams
- Cleveland Blues/Spiders (1887–1890); Baltimore Orioles (1893)

Robert James Gilks (July 2, 1864] – August 20, 1944) was an American Major League Baseball (MLB) pitcher and outfielder from 1887 to 1893. He played for the Cleveland Blues, Cleveland Spiders, and Baltimore Orioles. He would later serve as a scout for the New York Yankees of the American League, a role he would serve until 1923, when he was replaced by Johnny Nee. He signed George Pipgras, who would serve in the same role during the 1940s, to his first major league contract.

Gilks died at his home in Brunswick, Georgia on the evening of August 21, 1944.

== See also ==
- List of Major League Baseball annual saves leaders
