= Emmett Seery =

American baseball player (1861–1930)

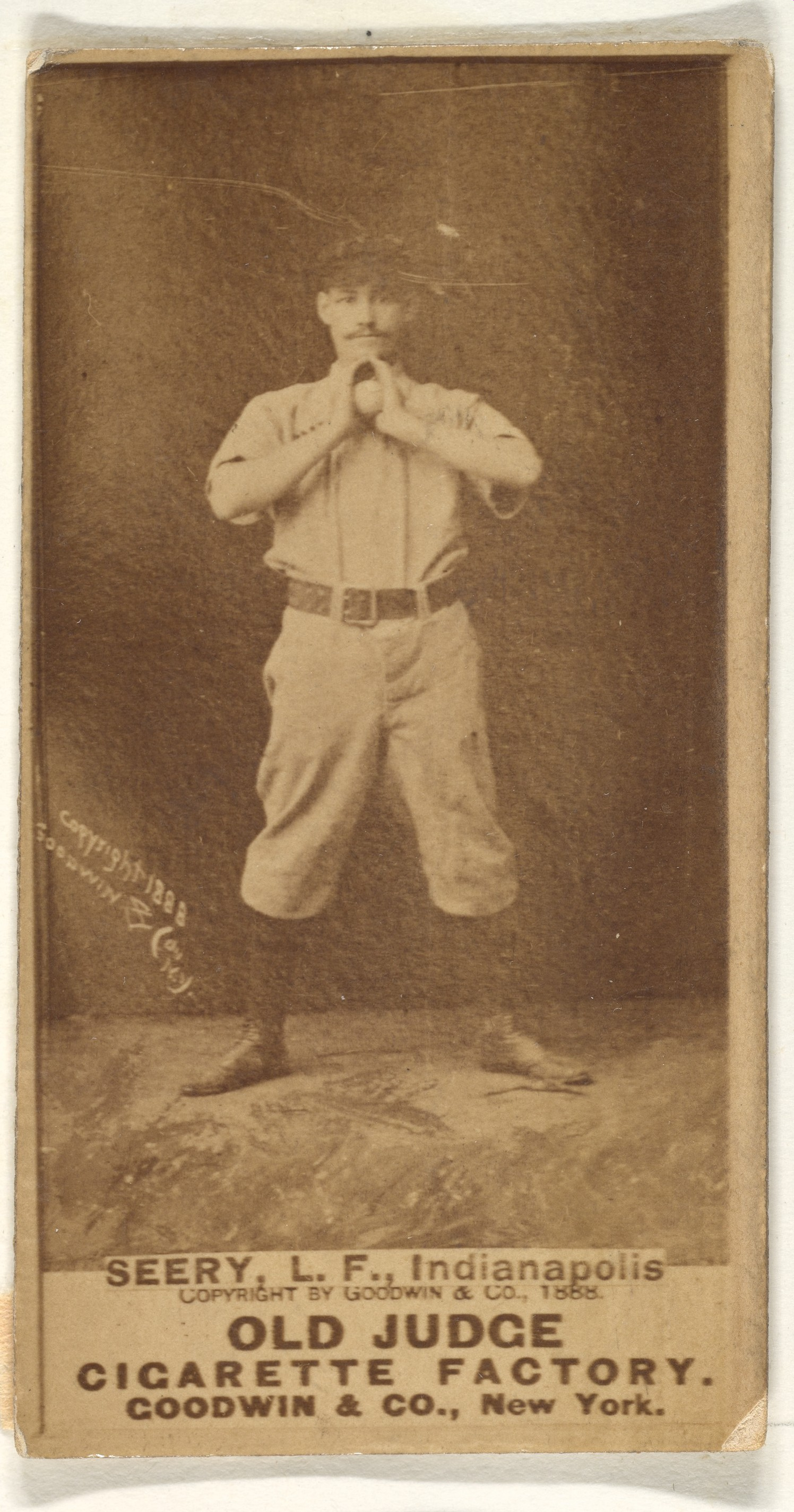
- Outfielder
- Born: February 13, 1861; Princeville, Illinois, U.S.
- Died: August 7, 1930 (aged 69); Saranac Lake, New York, U.S.
- Batted: Left Threw: Right

MLB debut
- April 17, 1884, for the Baltimore Monumentals

Last MLB appearance
- June 10, 1892, for the Louisville Colonels

MLB statistics
- Batting average: .252
- Home runs: 27
- Runs batted in: 300
- Stats at Baseball Reference

Teams
- Baltimore Monumentals (1884); Kansas City Cowboys (1884); St. Louis Maroons (1885–1886); Indianapolis Hoosiers (1887–1889); Brooklyn Ward's Wonders (1890); Cincinnati Kelly's Killers (1891); Louisville Colonels (1892)

John Emmett Seery (February 13, 1861 – August 7, 1930) was an American outfielder in Major League Baseball. He played for the Baltimore Monumentals, Kansas City Cowboys, St. Louis Maroons, Indianapolis Hoosiers, Brooklyn Ward's Wonders, Cincinnati Kelly's Killers, and Louisville Colonels from 1884 to 1892. His first six teams ended their existence in a season in which he played for them. In 916 career Major League games, Seery batted .252 with 893 hits. He was 5 feet, 7 inches tall and weighed 145 pounds.

== Career ==
Seery was born in Princeville, Illinois, in 1861. He played semi-pro baseball for a team in Waltham, Massachusetts. He started his professional baseball career in 1884 with the Union Association's Baltimore Monumentals. That season, he batted .313 and finished in the top five of several UA statistical categories, including batting average, on-base percentage (.342), hits (146), runs scored (115), and total bases (192). He also led the league's outfielders in putouts (157) and assists (26).

In 1885, Seery joined the Western League's member Kansas City Cowboys. He again performed well at the plate, pacing the circuit in both runs scored (43) and triples (9). He also pitched for the Cowboys and led all pitchers with 11 losses. Seery played for the Cowboys until the team disbanded.

Seery finished the 1886 season with the St. Louis Maroons of the National League until that team, too, disbanded at the close of the 1886 season. He batted just .162 in 59 games and took a lot of needling from his teammate, the "whiskey-guzzling" Charlie Sweeney. Seery and Sweeney got into a vicious fight that year, with the whole team siding with Seery.

In 1886, Seery raised his batting average to .238 while playing in a league-leading 126 games. He was then purchased by the Indianapolis Hoosiers in March 1887 and played the next three years there as the club's regular left fielder. In 1887, he batted .224, and in 1888, he batted .220 while ranking second in the league with 80 stolen bases. In 1889, he raised his average above .300, to .314, for the first and only time since his rookie season in the Union Association. It was arguably Seery's best campaign, and he finished in the National League's top 10 in on-base percentage (.401), hits (165), and runs scored (123).

The following year, Seery joined the Brooklyn Ward's Wonders of the Players' League, and his batting average fell to .223. In 1891, he went to the American Association. He batted .285 for the Cincinnati Kelly's Killers, and his .423 on-base percentage was fourth-best in the circuit. In 1892, Seery went back to the National League to play for the Louisville Colonels. He batted just .201 in 42 games, and the last Major League appearance of his career was on June 10. Seery also had short stints that year in the Southern Association and the Western League. His minor league and professional baseball career ended in 1895.

Seery was a patient hitter during his at bats. In 1887, the Detroit Free Press wrote that he was "a good enough waiter to preside at a restaurant." He finished in his league's top 10 in bases on balls five times, and he finished in the top 10 in strikeouts four times.

== Later life ==
After retiring from baseball Seery lived in Florida, "thriving" as the proprietor of an orange grove. In 1907, he attended an "Old-Timers Day" in Massachusetts with other former ballplayers.

Seery died in Saranac Lake, New York, in 1930. He was buried in All Saints Cemetery in Jensen Beach, Florida.

== See also ==
- List of Major League Baseball career stolen bases leaders
