= Frank Zinn =

American baseball player (1865–1936)

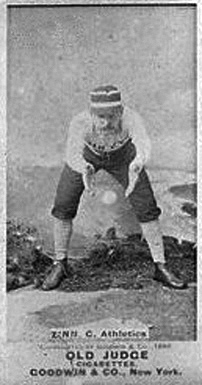
- Catcher
- Born: December 21, 1865; Phoenixville, Pennsylvania, US
- Died: May 12, 1936 (aged 70); Manayunk, Pennsylvania, US
- Batted: Unknown Threw: Unknown

MLB debut
- April 18, 1888, for the Philadelphia Athletics

Last MLB appearance
- May 3, 1888, for the Philadelphia Athletics

MLB statistics
- Batting average: .000
- Home runs: 0
- RBI: 0
- Stats at Baseball Reference

Teams
- Philadelphia Athletics (1888)

Frank Patrick Zinn (December 21, 1865 – May 12, 1936) was an American professional baseball catcher. He played two games in Major League Baseball in 1888 for the Philadelphia Athletics in the American Association.

Born in Phoenixville, Pennsylvania, he played his first game on April 18, 1888, and his final game on May 3, 1888. He was five-feet, eight-inches tall and weighed one-hundred fifty pounds. In seven at bats, he got no hits and one walk. He died at the age of 70 in Manayunk, Philadelphia.
