= Con Murphy (baseball) =

American baseball player (1863–1914)

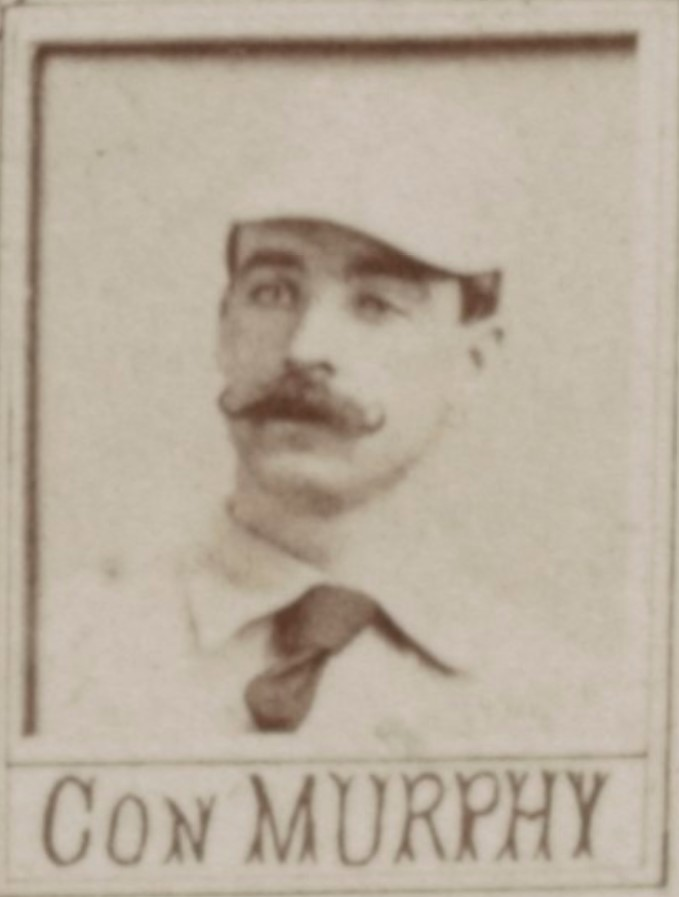
- Pitcher
- Born: October 15, 1863; Worcester, Massachusetts, U.S.
- Died: August 1, 1914 (aged 50); Worcester, Massachusetts, U.S.
- Batted: Unknown Threw: Right

MLB debut
- September 11, 1884, for the Philadelphia Quakers

Last MLB appearance
- September 6, 1890, for the Brooklyn Ward's Wonders

MLB statistics
- Win–loss record: 4-13
- Earned run average: 5.07
- Strikeouts: 39
- Stats at Baseball Reference

Teams
- Philadelphia Quakers (1884); Brooklyn Ward's Wonders (1890)

Cornelius B. Murphy (October 15, 1863 – August 1, 1914), nicknamed "Monk" and "Razzle Dazzle", was an American professional baseball player who played pitcher in the Major Leagues for the 1884 Philadelphia Quakers of the National League and the 1890 Brooklyn Ward's Wonders of the Players' League. In between, he played in the minor leagues.
