= Jackie Hayes (catcher) =

American baseball player (1861–1905)

- Catcher / Center fielder
- Born: June 27, 1861; Brooklyn, New York, US
- Died: April 25, 1905 (aged 43); Brooklyn, New York, US
- Batted: Unknown Threw: Right

MLB debut
- May 2, 1882, for the Worcester Ruby Legs

Last MLB appearance
- August 23, 1890, for the Brooklyn Ward's Wonders

MLB statistics
- Batting average: .233
- Home runs: 10
- Runs batted in: 81
- Stats at Baseball Reference

Teams
- Worcester Ruby Legs (1882); Pittsburgh Alleghenys (1883–1884); Brooklyn Atlantics / Grays (1884–1885); Washington Nationals (1886); Baltimore Orioles (1887); Brooklyn Ward's Wonders (1890)

John J. Hayes (June 27, 1861 – April 25, 1905) was an American Major League Baseball player from Brooklyn, New York, who split most of his playing time between catcher and in center field.

== Career ==
From 1882 to 1887, Hayes he played for seven different teams getting most of his playing time in his first two seasons when playing for the Worcester Ruby Legs, and the Pittsburgh Alleghenys. In 1890, he returned to major league baseball when he played for the Brooklyn Ward's Wonders.

Hayes is known for one infamous game on June 17, 1885 when playing for the Brooklyn Grays, he and his teammates resented the arrival of Phenomenal Smith, whose brash demeanor didn't sit well with the veterans on the team, and committed 28 errors en route to an 18–5 loss to the St. Louis Browns, with Hayes committing seven of them. After the game, Charlie Byrne fired manager Charlie Hackett, and handed out heavy fines to the guilty players.

== Post-career ==
Jackie Hayes died at the age of 43 in his hometown of Brooklyn, and is interred at Calvary Cemetery, Woodside, New York.
