= Art Sunday =

American baseball player (1862–1926)

- Outfielder
- Born: January 21, 1862; Springfield, Illinois, U.S.
- Died: August 26, 1926 (aged 64); Reno, Nevada, U.S.
- Batted: Left Threw: Left

MLB debut
- May 5, 1890, for the Brooklyn Ward's Wonders

Last MLB appearance
- August 26, 1890, for the Brooklyn Ward's Wonders

MLB statistics
- Batting average: .265
- Home runs: 0
- Runs batted in: 13
- Stats at Baseball Reference

Teams
- Brooklyn Ward's Wonders (1890)

Arthur Sunday (born Arthur Hawker; January 21, 1862 – August 26, 1926), was an American Major League Baseball player who played outfield for the Brooklyn Ward's Wonders of the Players' League in 1890. Arthur Hawker "Sunday" was the son of John C. Hawker and Marguerite Knox Hawker. He married Ira "Izzie" Hart June 27, 1885. It appears he changed his name to Art Sunday around 1885, although it is unknown as to why.

Sunday died in 1926 after suffering burns from a fire while working for a fire patrol. He is buried in Lone Mountain Cemetery.
