= Whitey Gibson =

American baseball player (1868–1907)

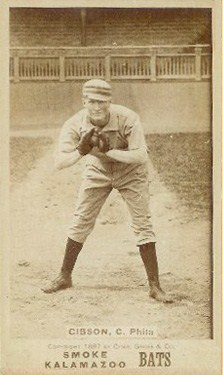
- Catcher
- Born: October 6, 1868; Lancaster, Pennsylvania, U.S.
- Died: October 12, 1907 (aged 39); Talmage, Pennsylvania, U.S.
- Batted: Unknown Threw: Right

MLB debut
- May 2, 1888, for the Philadelphia Athletics

Last MLB appearance
- May 2, 1888, for the Philadelphia Athletics

MLB statistics
- Batting average: .000
- Hits: 0
- Runs: 0
- Home Runs: 0
- Stats at Baseball Reference

Teams
- Philadelphia Athletics (1888)

Leighton P. "Whitey" Gibson (October 6, 1868 – October 12, 1907) was an American professional baseball catcher in the major leagues in 1888 for the Philadelphia Athletics of the American Association. He appeared in one major league game for the Philadelphia A's in that year. He remained active in the minor leagues through 1893.

Gibson died in 1907 in Talmage, Pennsylvania of puerperal mania.
