= Paul Cook (baseball) =

American baseball player (1863–1905)

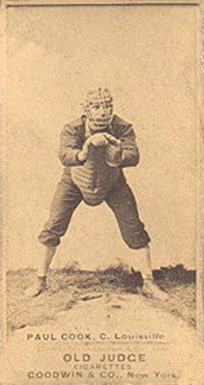
- Catcher
- Born: May 5, 1863; Caledonia, New York, U.S.
- Died: May 25, 1905 (aged 42); Rochester, New York, U.S.
- Batted: Right Threw: Right

MLB debut
- September 13, 1884, for the Philadelphia Quakers

Last MLB appearance
- July 16, 1891, for the St. Louis Browns

MLB statistics
- Batting average: .223
- Home runs: 0
- Runs batted in: 114
- Stats at Baseball Reference

Teams
- Philadelphia Quakers (1884); Louisville Colonels (1886–89); Brooklyn Ward's Wonders (1890); Louisville Colonels (1891); St. Louis Browns (1891)

Paul Cook (May 5, 1863 – May 25, 1905) was an American professional baseball player. He played all or part of seven seasons in Major League Baseball, between 1884 and 1891, for the Philadelphia Quakers, Louisville Colonels, Brooklyn Ward's Wonders, and St. Louis Browns, primarily as a catcher.

== Sources ==
- Career statistics from Baseball Reference · Baseball Reference (Minors) · Retrosheet · Baseball Almanac
