= Bill Joyce (baseball) =

American baseball player and manager (1867–1941)

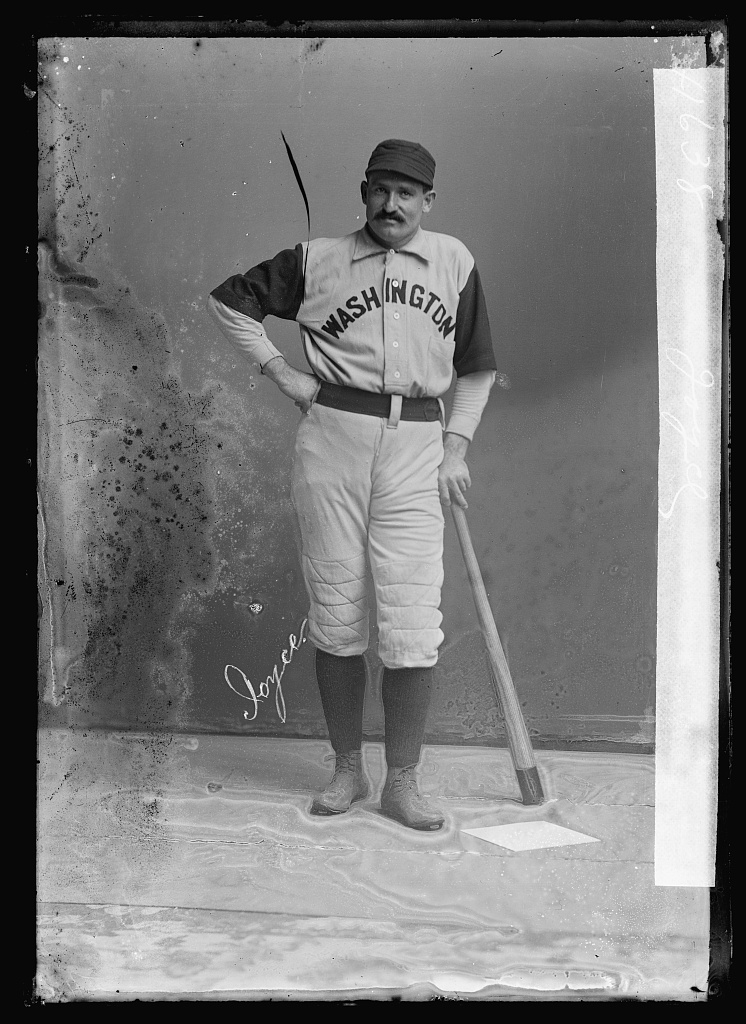
- Joyce in 1894
- Third baseman / Manager
- Born: September 22, 1867; St. Louis, Missouri, U.S.
- Died: May 8, 1941 (aged 73); St. Louis, Missouri, U.S.
- Batted: Left Threw: Right

MLB debut
- April 19, 1890, for the Brooklyn Ward's Wonders

Last MLB appearance
- October 12, 1898, for the New York Giants

MLB statistics
- Batting average: .293
- Home runs: 70
- Runs batted in: 609
- Stats at Baseball Reference

Teams
- As player: Brooklyn Ward's Wonders (1890); Boston Reds (1891); Brooklyn Grooms (1892); Washington Senators (1894–1896); New York Giants (1896–1898); As manager: New York Giants (1896–1898)

Career highlights and awards
- NL home run leader (1896)

William Michael Joyce (September 22, 1867 – May 8, 1941) was an American professional baseball player and manager. He was a third baseman over parts of eight seasons with the Brooklyn Ward's Wonders (of the Players' League), Boston Reds (of the American Association), Brooklyn Grooms, Washington Senators, and New York Giants. He also served as manager during his tenure with the Giants.

Joyce was born on September 22, 1867, to Irish immigrants in St. Louis, Missouri. He worked in a rolling mill before beginning his minor league career in the Texas League in 1887. He continued in the Texas League in 1888 and 1889.

Joyce impressed St. Louis Browns player-manager Charlie Comiskey at a December 1889 exhibition game, leading Comiskey to recommend that Players' League founder John Montgomery Ward hire Joyce for his Brooklyn Ward's Wonders club. In the Players' League's lone season, Joyce led the league in walks, with 123 in 133 games. In 1891, he reached base in 64 consecutive games, a major league record not bettered until 1941. After the Players' League folded, Joyce signed with the Boston Reds of the American Association for that league's final year, 1891. He then joined Monte Ward's Brooklyn Grooms for the 1892 season. After an offseason trade, he held out against the Washington Senators for the entire 1893 season. He returned in 1894 and was named team captain.

Joyce became a leading slugger for the next several seasons; between 1894 and 1898, he led the majors in home runs (60), was fifth in slugging percentage (.497), and seventh in on-base percentage (.444). He tied for the National League lead in home runs in 1896 (with Ed Delahanty) while playing for Washington and New York, and finished second three other times. He holds the record with four triples in one game, which he accomplished in 1897 (tying George Strief's 1885 record). Joyce served as player-manager with New York.

Despite generally being popular with other players, Joyce gradually lost favor with Giants owner Andrew Freedman and was not brought back after the 1898 season. Joyce also developed a reputation as a frequent and vociferous critic of umpire calls, earning numerous fines for arguing. Pioneering baseball writer Henry Chadwick criticized his "pernicious habit of stupid kicking."

In 906 games over eight seasons, Joyce posted a .293 batting average (971-for-3,310) with 822 runs, 153 doubles, 106 triples, 70 home runs, 609 RBI, 266 stolen bases, 721 bases on balls, .435 on-base percentage and .467 slugging percentage. His walk rate of 17.3% was the second-highest in major league history between 1871 and 1920, the advent of the live-ball era.

After retiring in December 1899, Joyce held many jobs, including saloonkeeper, minor league owner and manager, professional baseball scout, security guard, and municipal smoke inspector. He married in 1908.

Joyce died on May 8, 1941, in St. Louis, at the age of 73. He is buried at Bellefontaine Cemetery.

== See also ==
- List of Major League Baseball career triples leaders
- List of Major League Baseball career stolen bases leaders
- List of Major League Baseball triples records
- List of Major League Baseball players to hit for the cycle
- List of Major League Baseball annual home run leaders
- List of Major League Baseball player-managers

Achievements
| Preceded by Herman Long | Hitting for the cycle May 30, 1896 | Succeeded by Harry Davis |
