= Dick Van Zant =

American baseball player (1864–1912)

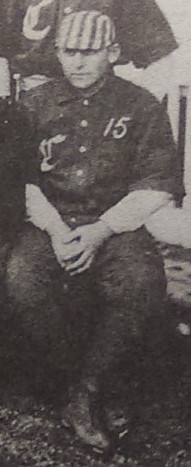
- Van Zant in 1888
- Third baseman
- Born: November 1864; Richmond, Indiana, U.S.
- Died: August 6, 1912 (aged 47); Richmond, Indiana, U.S.
- Batted: Unknown Threw: Unknown

MLB debut
- October 4, 1888, for the Cleveland Blues

Last MLB appearance
- October 15, 1888, for the Cleveland Blues

MLB statistics
- Batting average: .258
- Home runs: 0
- Runs batted in: 1
- Stats at Baseball Reference

Teams
- Cleveland Blues (1888)

Richard Van Zant (November 1864 – August 6, 1912) was an American third baseman in Major League Baseball. Nicknamed "Foghorn Dick", he played 10 games for the Cleveland Blues during the 1888 season. He died in 1912 and is buried in Earlham Cemetery in Richmond, Indiana.
