= Bob Gamble =

American baseball player (1867–1958)

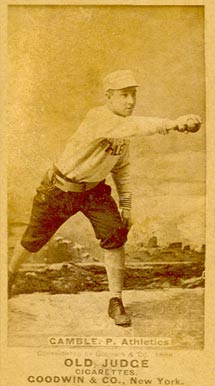
- Pitcher
- Born: February 6, 1867; Philadelphia, Pennsylvania, U.S.
- Died: August 4, 1958 (aged 91); Bucks County, Pennsylvania, U.S.
- Batted: Unknown Threw: Right

MLB debut
- May 2, 1888, for the Philadelphia Athletics

Last MLB appearance
- May 2, 1888, for the Philadelphia Athletics

MLB statistics
- Win–loss record: 0–1
- Earned run average: 8.00
- Strikeouts: 2
- Stats at Baseball Reference

Teams
- Philadelphia Athletics (1888)

Robert J. Gamble (February 6, 1867 – August 4, 1958) was an American 19th-century Major League Baseball player.
