= John Sowders =

American baseball player (1866–1939)

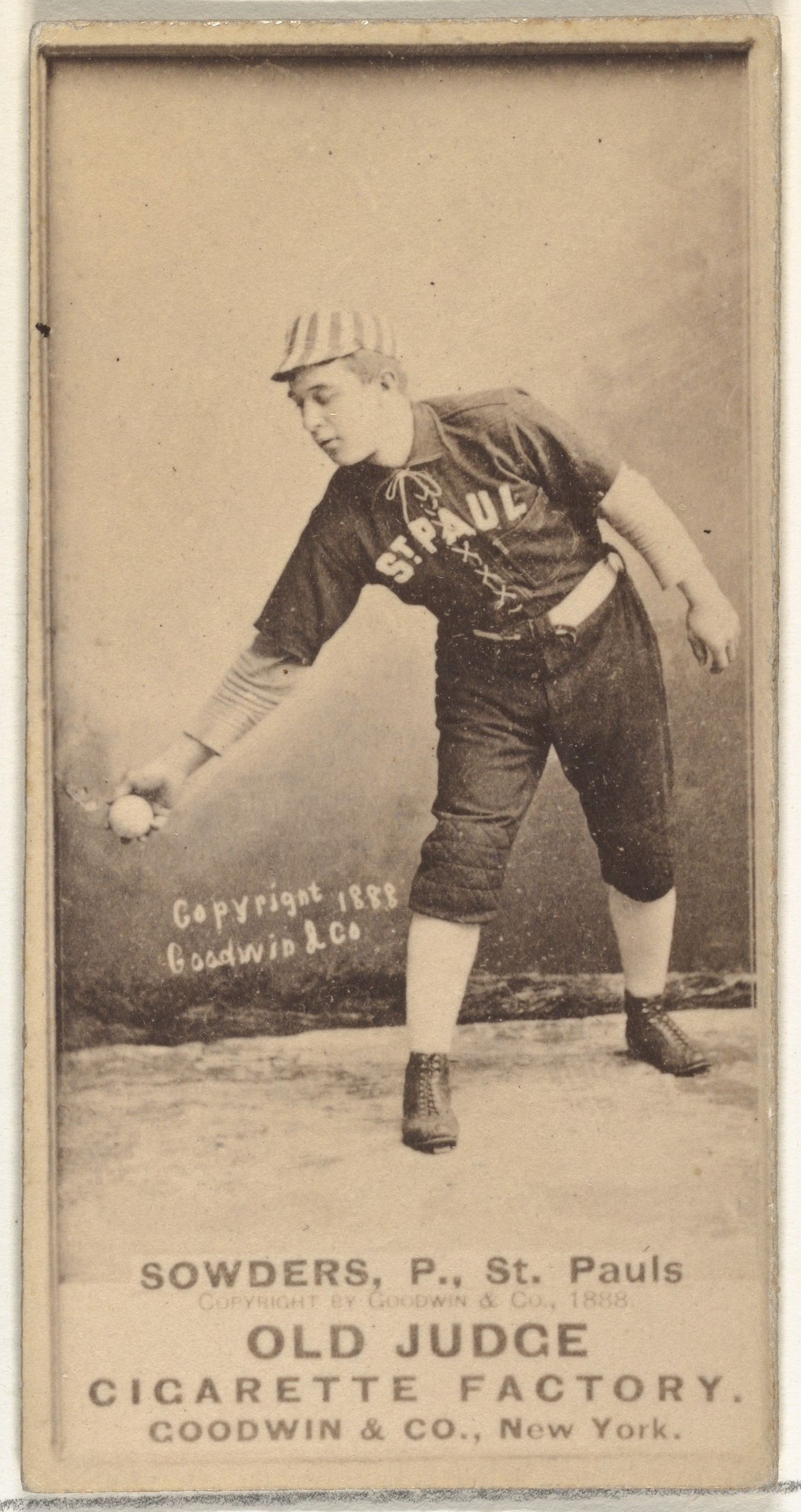
- Pitcher
- Born: December 10, 1866; Louisville, Kentucky, U.S.
- Died: July 29, 1939 (aged 72); Indianapolis, Indiana, U.S.
- Batted: Right Threw: Left

MLB debut
- June 28, 1887, for the Indianapolis Hoosiers

Last MLB appearance
- October 4, 1890, for the Brooklyn Ward's Wonders

MLB statistics
- Win–loss record: 25-32
- Earned run average: 4.29
- Strikeouts: 195
- Stats at Baseball Reference

Teams
- Indianapolis Hoosiers (1887); Kansas City Cowboys (1889); Brooklyn Ward's Wonders (1890)

John Sowders (December 10, 1866 – July 29, 1939) was an American Major League Baseball pitcher. He played all or part of three seasons in the majors, between 1887 and 1890, for the Indianapolis Hoosiers, Kansas City Cowboys and Brooklyn Ward's Wonders. Sowders was the brother of fellow major leaguers Bill and Len Sowders.

He is buried at Crown Hill Cemetery and Arboretum, Indianapolis, Indiana, Section 232, Lot 502.

== Sources ==
- Career statistics from Baseball Reference · Baseball Reference (Minors) · Retrosheet · Baseball Almanac
