= Ed Keas =

American baseball player (1863–1940)

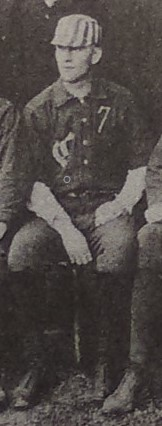
- Keas in 1888
- Pitcher
- Born: January 2, 1863; Dubuque, Iowa, U.S.
- Died: January 12, 1940 (aged 77); Dubuque, Iowa, U.S.
- Batted: Unknown Threw: Unknown

MLB debut
- August 25, 1888, for the Cleveland Blues

Last MLB appearance
- October 16, 1888, for the Cleveland Blues

MLB statistics
- Win–loss record: 3–3
- Earned run average: 2.29
- Strikeouts: 18
- Stats at Baseball Reference

Teams
- Cleveland Blues (1888)

Edward James Keas (January 2, 1863 – January 12, 1940) was an American pitcher in Major League Baseball. He played for the 1888 Cleveland Blues of the American Association.
