= Doc Oberlander =

American baseball player (1864–1922)

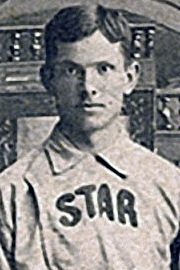
- Pitcher
- Born: May 12, 1864; Waukegan, Illinois, U.S.
- Died: November 14, 1922 (aged 58); Pryor, Montana, U.S.
- Batted: Unknown Threw: Left

MLB debut
- May 16, 1888, for the Cleveland Blues

Last MLB appearance
- June 2, 1888, for the Cleveland Blues

MLB statistics
- Win–loss record: 1–2
- Strikeouts: 23
- Earned run average: 5.26
- Stats at Baseball Reference

Teams
- Cleveland Blues (1888)

Hartman Louis "Doc" Oberlander (May 12, 1864 – November 14, 1922) was an American Major League Baseball pitcher, who pitched in three games for the 1888 Cleveland Blues of the American Association. He played through 1891 in the minor leagues and went to school at Syracuse University.
