= Washington Park (baseball) =

Group of baseball parks in the New York City borough of Brooklyn

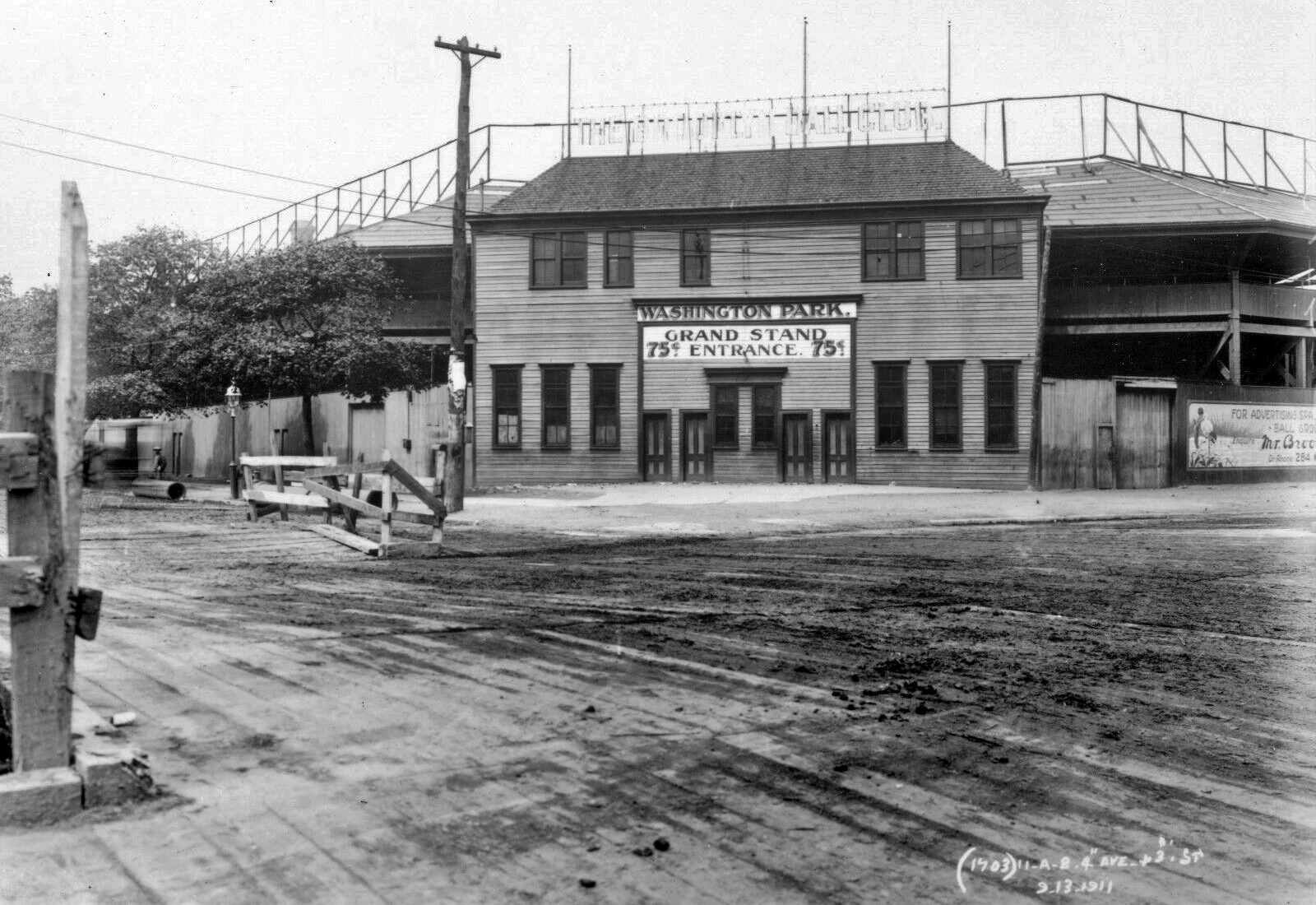
- Entrance to the second incarnation of Washington Park, 1911

- Location in New York City Location within the State of New York Location within the United States
- Address: Brooklyn, New York 11215
- Coordinates: 40°40′26.3″N 73°59′08.6″W

Construction
- Built: 1883 (first park); 1897–1898 (second park); 1914 (third park)
- Opened: April 12, 1883 (first park); April 30, 1898 (third park); April 14, 1914 (fourth park)
- Demolished: 1891 (first park); 1913 (second park); 1922 (third park)

Tenants
- (first park); Brooklyn /Atlantics /Bridegrooms (AA/NL) 1883–1890; (second park); Brooklyn Grooms/Superbas (NL) 1898–1912; (fourth park); Brooklyn Tip-Tops (FL) 1914–1915

Washington Park was the name given to three Major League Baseball parks on two different sites in the Park Slope neighborhood of Brooklyn, New York, located at the intersection of Third Street and Fourth Avenue. The two sites were diagonally opposite each other, on the southeast and northwest corners.

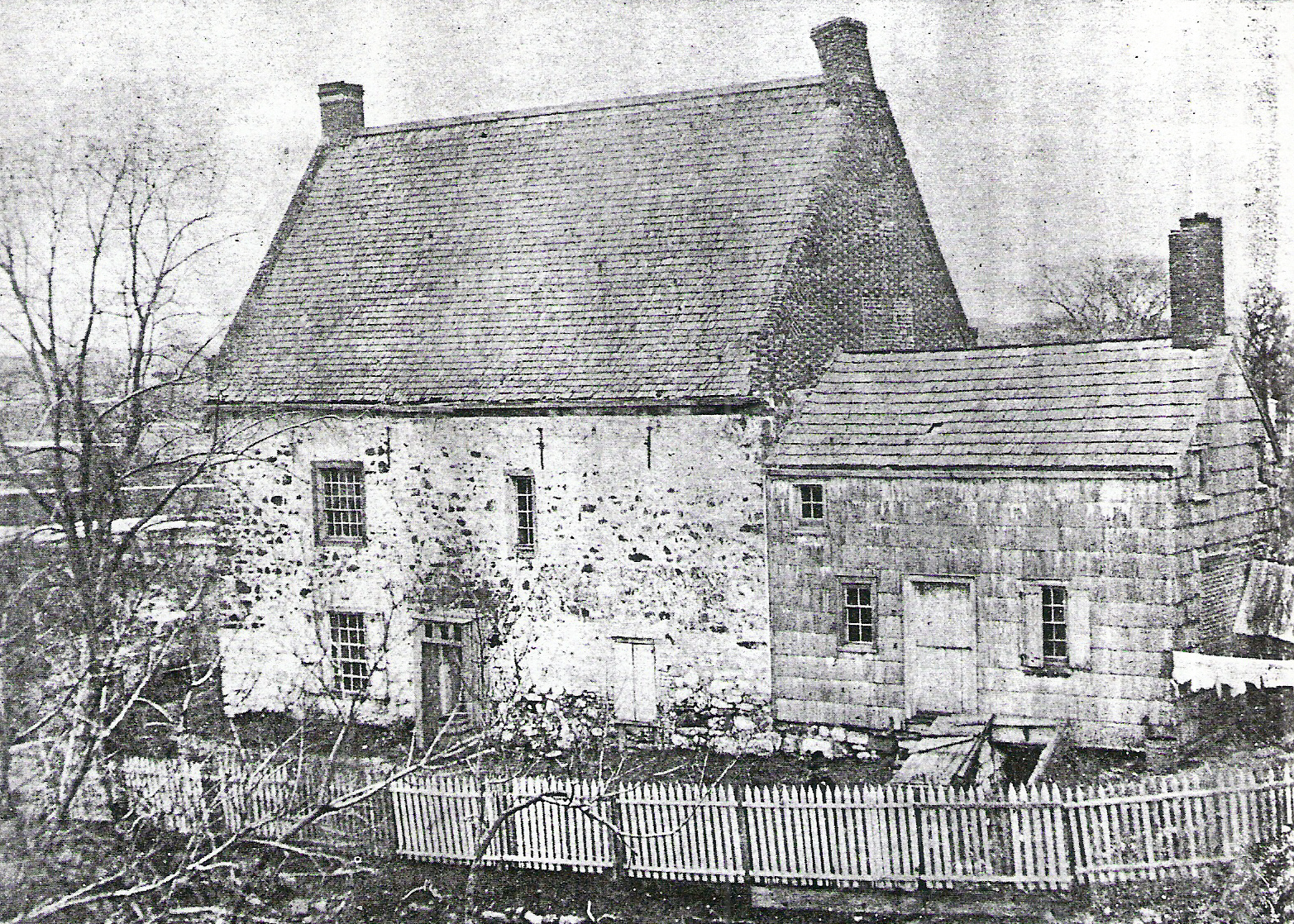
Gowanus House

The land on which the ballparks were built was itself known as "Washington Park" and originally consisted largely of an open green space which was flooded in the wintertime as a skating rink. It featured an old building then called the Gowanus House, which stands today, albeit largely reconstructed. Known today as the Old Stone House, it was used in Revolutionary times as an impromptu headquarters by General George Washington during the Battle of Long Island, during a delaying action by 400 Maryland troops against approximately 2000 British and Hessian troops that allowed a good portion of the Continental Army to retreat to fortified positions on Brooklyn Heights. Those events inspired the park's name, as well as that of the three major league ballparks that were to be built there.

Baseball first came to Washington Park in 1861, in the form of a winter baseball game played on skates. The Brooklyn Atlantics professionals took on the Charter Oak Base Ball Club, another Brooklyn-based team, before 15,000 spectators. The New York Times marveled at the skating skills of the players, insisting that the players "seemed to be quite as much at home (on the ice), and played as well on runners (skates) as when on terra firma." The Atlantics took the contest, 36–27.

== First park ==
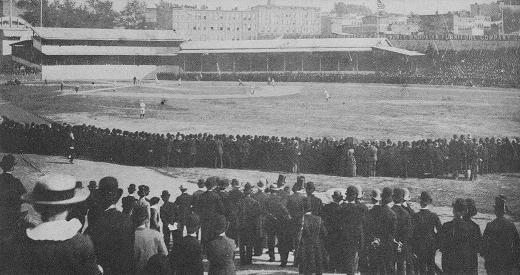
Washington Park on Decoration Day (Memorial Day), May 30, 1887

The first ballpark was built in 1883, bounded by Third and Fifth Streets to the north and south, and Fourth and Fifth Avenues to the west and east. The Old Stone House was incorporated into the ballpark as a "Ladies' House" and storage. The wooden ballpark was the home of the Brooklyn baseball club during 1883–1891, with a slight interruption by a destructive fire in mid-May of the 1889 season. (Some sources, such as Retrosheet, number the pre- and post-fire ballparks as separate entities.) The team's uniforms and equipment had been stored in the Old Stone House at the time and were spared.

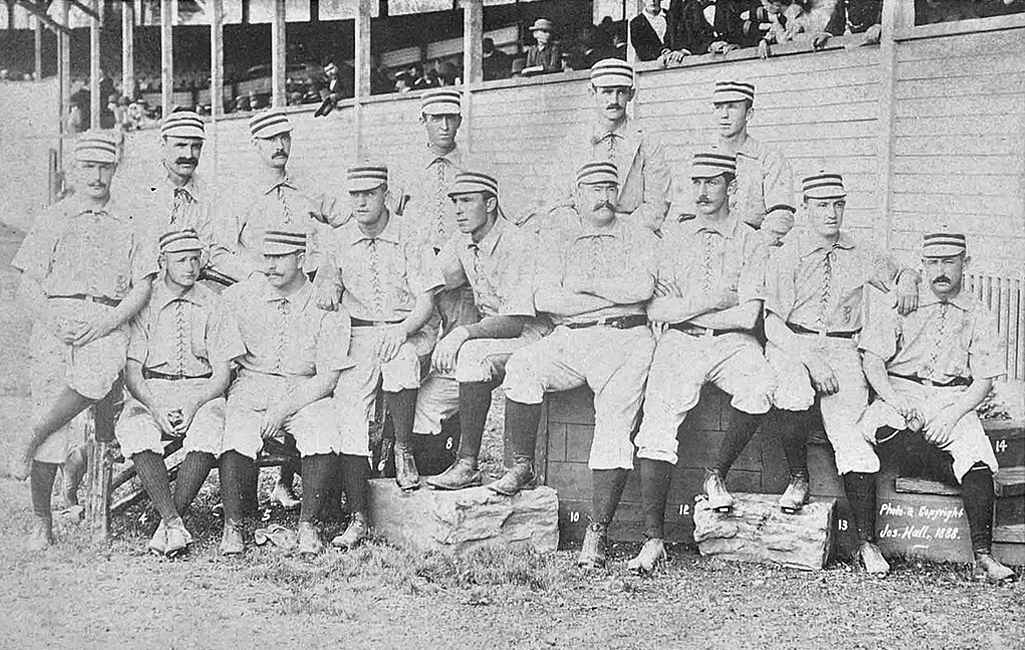
The 1888 Brooklyn Bridegrooms pose in front of the Washington Park grandstand

The team, originally known as the Brooklyn Grays for the color of their uniforms, started in a minor league in 1883. The following season they joined the then-major American Association. With the new league came a new name, the Atlantics in reference to the old Atlantics of Brooklyn, and they were known as the Bridegrooms by the time they switched to the National League in 1890. Streetcar (trolley) tracks ran near the ballpark, inspiring the team nickname that ultimately stuck: Trolley Dodgers.

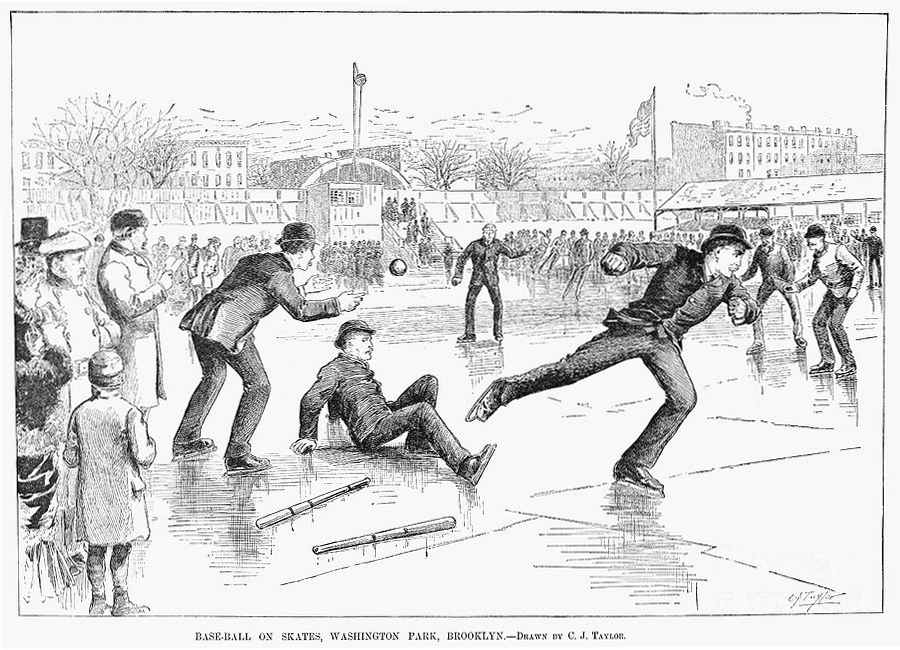
Woodcut of baseball on ice in Washington Park, published in Harper's Weekly in 1884

The ice baseball fad resurfaced in the mid-1880s, leading writer Henry Chadwick to organize a series of games at Washington Park. Teams of professional ballplayers faced off against amateurs in January 1884, ten to a side (the tenth player covering the park's short right field).

In 1891, the Trolley Dodgers moved into the one-year-old Players' League ballpark, Eastern Park in Brownsville. The first Washington Park was demolished and its wooden grandstand transported to Eastern Park. The move itself proved to be ill-advised, and the Dodgers struggled to draw fans in their new neighborhood. They abandoned Eastern Park after six poorly attended seasons, moving back to Park Slope and building a new ballpark across the street from the site of their first.

== Second park ==
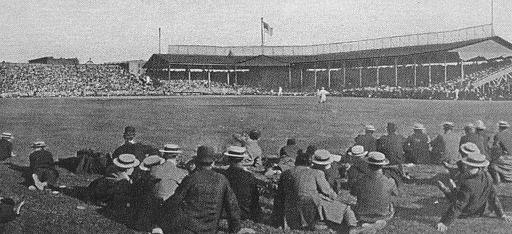
Washington Park c. 1909

The second Washington Park was bounded by First and Third streets, and Third and Fourth avenues. It was located at 40°40′30″N 73°59′10″W. The park seated 18,800. It consisted of a covered grandstand behind the infield and uncovered stand down the right field line. The Brooklyn National Leaguers, by then often called the "Superbas" as well as the "Dodgers", moved into this new ballpark in 1898, where they would play for the next 15 seasons. On April 30, 1898, the Dodgers played their first game at new Washington Park and 15,000 fans attended. One of the more unusual features of the Park was the aroma from nearby factories and Gowanus Canal, which was a block away and curled around two sides of the ballpark.

Meanwhile, owner Charlie Ebbets slowly invested in the individual lots on a larger piece of property in Flatbush, which would become the site of Ebbets Field once he had the entire block. So in 1913, the Dodgers abandoned Washington Park. The Brooklyn Daily Eagle waxed nostalgic about the old ballpark, and speculated on what might happen to the property. It would turn out to have a brief reincarnation as the home of the Federal League club in 1914 and 1915.

=== Seating capacity ===
Washington Park #2 demolition

Years	Capacity
1898–1907	12,000
1908–1911	14,000
1912	16,000

== Third park ==
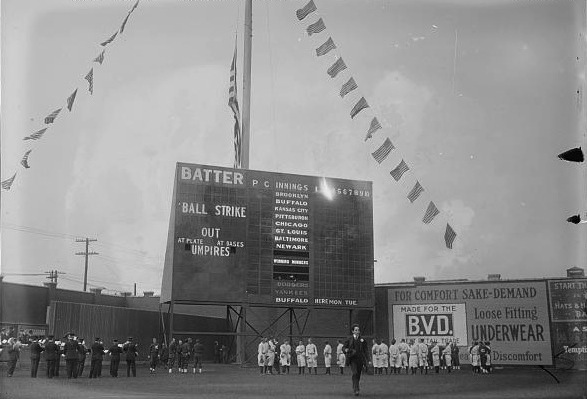
Flag raising at Washington Park on April 10, 1915. Washington Park's scoreboard stood on "legs", visible in this photo. The legs were in play, so center fielders had to run under the scoreboard to retrieve baseballs. Much of the wall visible in this photo still stands at 3rd Avenue and 1st Street.

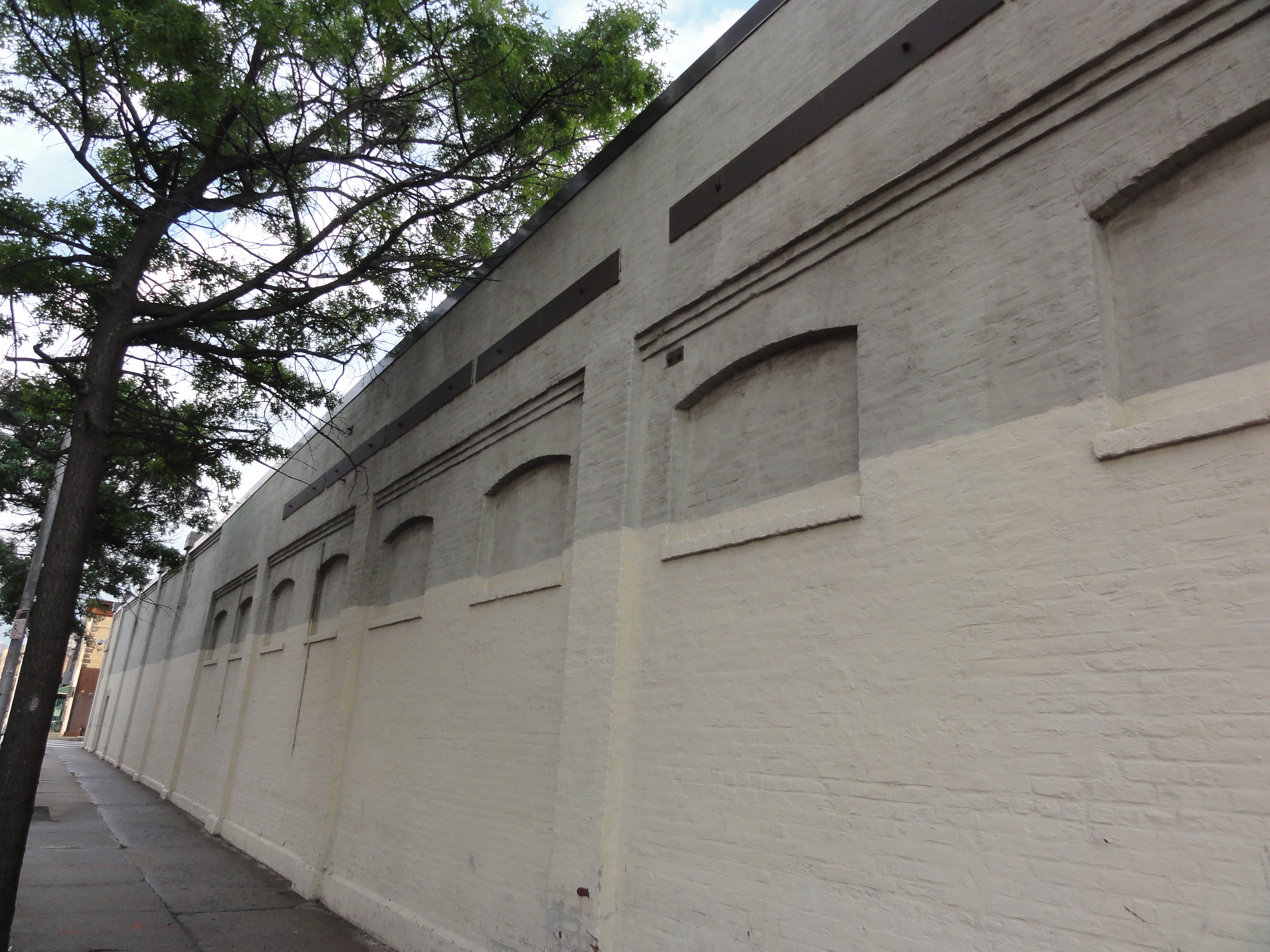
The remaining wall of Washington Park in 2011

The Brooklyn Tip-Tops or "BrookFeds" of the Federal League, the only major league team ever named for a loaf of bread, acquired the ballpark property in 1914, then rebuilt the second Washington Park in steel and concrete. The old park took on a modern appearance; in fact, it was nearly a duplicate of the initial version of another Federal League park in Chicago that would become Wrigley Field. However, with the Dodgers in a new and somewhat more spacious steel-and-concrete home already, Ebbets Field, there was no long-term need for Washington Park, so it was abandoned for the final time after the Federal League ended its two-year run.

Part of the left center field wall of this final Washington Park still stands on the east side of 3rd Avenue, south of 1st Street, as part of a Con Edison yard.

== Dimensions ==
The second Washington Park between 1st Street and 3rd Street sported these dimensions.

- Left field – 335 ft (1898), 375.95 ft (1908), 300 ft (1914)
- Left center field – 500 ft (1898), 443.5 ft (1908)
- Center field – 445 ft (1898), 424.7 ft (1908), 400 ft (1914)
- Right center field – 300 ft (1898)
- Right field – 215 ft (1898), 295 ft (1899), 301.84 ft (1908), 275 ft (1914)
- Backstop – 90 ft (1898), 15 ft (1908)

Fence heights:

- Left field to center field – 12 ft.
- Right field – 42 ft (13 ft. brick fence topped by 29 ft. of canvas)
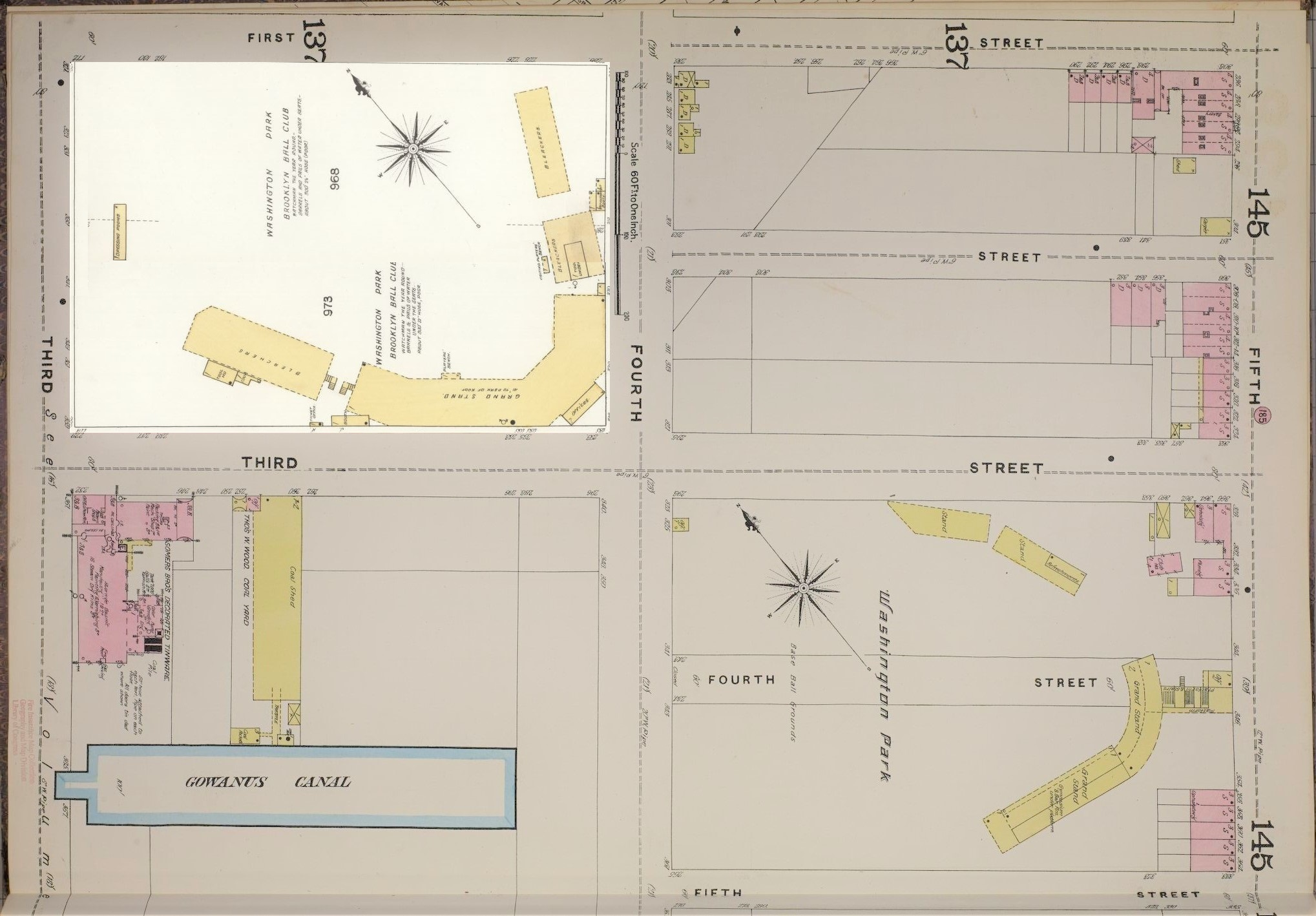
Relative locations of the two ballpark sites

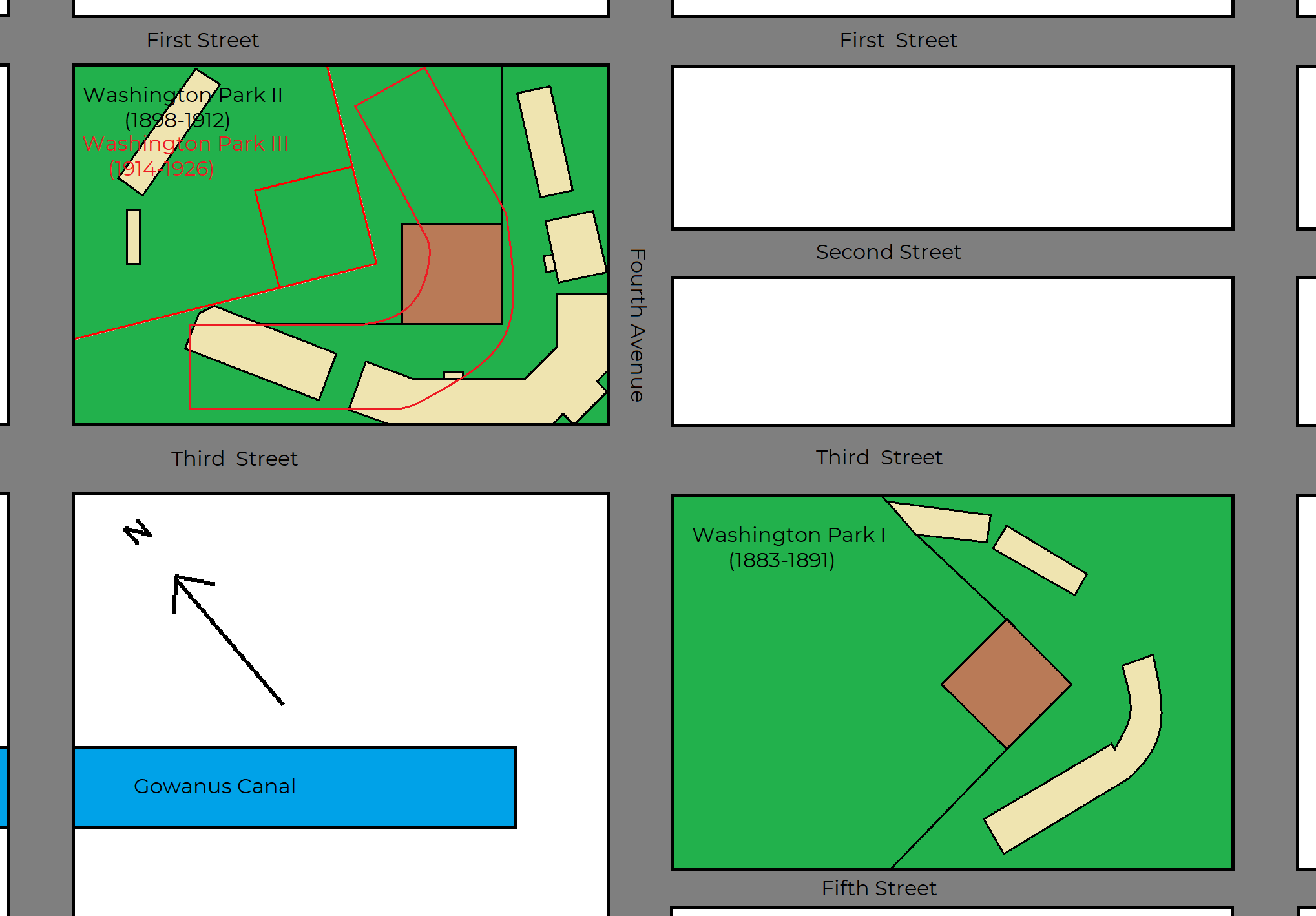
Simplified version + Federal League layout

Preceded by first ballpark Eastern Park	Home of the Brooklyn Dodgers; 1884–1890; 1898–1912	Succeeded by: Eastern Park; Ebbets Field
