= Con Daily =

American baseball player (1864–1928)

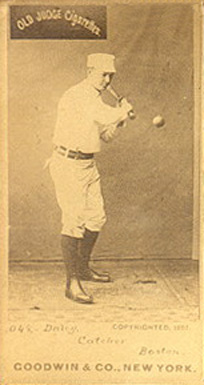
- Catcher
- Born: September 11, 1864; Blackstone, Massachusetts, U.S.
- Died: June 14, 1928 (aged 63); Brooklyn, New York, U.S.
- Batted: Left Threw: Right

MLB debut
- May 6, 1885, for the Philadelphia Keystones

Last MLB appearance
- July 5, 1896, for the Chicago Colts

MLB statistics
- Batting average: .244
- Home runs: 2
- Runs batted in: 262
- Stats at Baseball Reference

Teams
- Providence Grays (1885); Boston Beaneaters (1886–1887); Indianapolis Hoosiers (1888–1889); Brooklyn Ward's Wonders (1890); Brooklyn Grooms (1891–1895); Chicago Colts (1896)

Cornelius F. Daily (September 11, 1864 – June 14, 1928) was an American professional baseball catcher. He played in Major League Baseball (MLB) for the Providence Grays, Boston Beaneaters, Indianapolis Hoosiers, Brooklyn Ward's Wonders, Brooklyn Grooms, and Chicago Colts between 1885 and 1896.
