= Lou Bierbauer =

American baseball player (1865–1926)

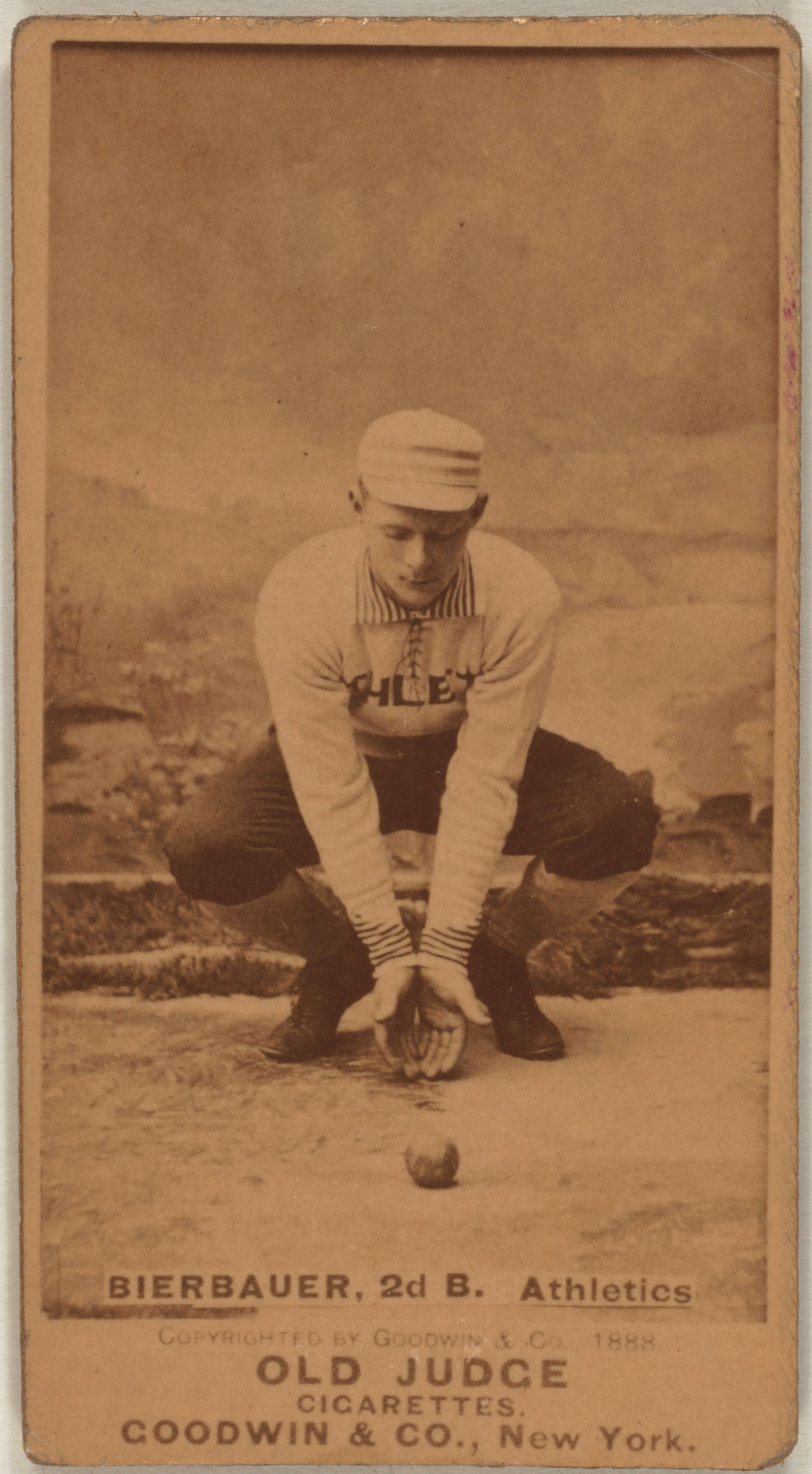
- Second baseman
- Born: September 28, 1865; Erie, Pennsylvania, U.S.
- Died: January 31, 1926 (aged 60); Erie, Pennsylvania, U.S.
- Batted: Left Threw: Right

MLB debut
- April 17, 1886, for the Philadelphia Athletics

Last MLB appearance
- April 30, 1898, for the St. Louis Browns

MLB statistics
- Batting average: .267
- Home runs: 34
- Runs batted in: 839
- Stats at Baseball Reference

Teams
- Philadelphia Athletics (1886–1889); Brooklyn Ward's Wonders (1890); Pittsburgh Pirates (1891–1896); St. Louis Browns (1897–1898)

Louis W. Bierbauer (September 28, 1865 – January 31, 1926) was an American professional baseball player. He was a second baseman in Major League Baseball during the late 1880s and 1890s. Over that period of time, he played for the Philadelphia Athletics of the American Association before joining many other major leaguers in jumping to the Brooklyn Ward's Wonders in the newly formed Players' League for the 1890 season, a league which folded after just one year of play.

== A "piratical" act ==
When the Players' League folded in 1891, pretty much every player that left the National League or the American Association for the league in 1890 was allowed to return to their original team. However, Lou Bierbauer never signed a contract to return to the Philadelphia Athletics. The National League's Pittsburgh Alleghenys, realizing Bierbauer's absence in the Athletics lineup, soon became determined to sign him at all costs.

Alfred Spink, the founder of the Sporting News, wrote about the incident in his 1910 book "The National Game". According to Spink, the Alleghenys' manager, Ned Hanlon, traveled to Erie in the dead of winter to sign him with the Alleghenys.

The Athletics, upon learning of this deal, objected to Bierbauer's signing and stated that he should return to the A's, since that was the team that employed him before his defection to the failed Players' League. An official for the American Association also objected to Bierbauer signing with the Alleghenys and called the act "piratical." However the Alleghenys contended that since "the [American Association] did not reserve Bierbauer, he was a free agent". An arbitrator agreed, and soon players and fans alike were calling the team the "Pirates."

== Legacy ==
Bierbauer played for the Pirates for six seasons before moving on to the St. Louis Browns from 1897 to 1898. He later finished his professional baseball career in the minor leagues.

Alfred Spink would go on to call Bierbauer the "one-time king of second basemen", a great "all-around player" who dominated both the National League and the American Association. In a 1955 story also reprinted in The Pirates Reader, a friend of Bierbauer told the Pittsburgh Sun-Telegraph that "Louie loved the Pirates and rooted for them until the day of his death in 1926."

Bierbauer died in his hometown of Erie, Pennsylvania at the age of 60, and is interred at Erie Cemetery.

== See also ==
- List of Major League Baseball career stolen bases leaders
