= Eastern Park =

Former stadium in Brooklyn, New York

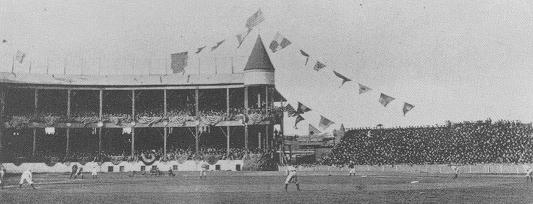
- Eastern Park on Opening Day 1894
- Interactive map of Eastern Park
- Location: Brooklyn, New York, United States
- Coordinates: 40°40′12″N 73°54′10″W
- Capacity: 12,000
- Surface: Grass

Tenants
- Brooklyn Ward's Wonders (PL) (1890); Brooklyn Grooms / Bridegrooms (NL) (1891–1897)

Eastern Park was a baseball park in the Brownsville neighborhood of Brooklyn, New York in the 1890s. It was bounded by Eastern Parkway—later renamed Pitkin Avenue when Eastern Parkway was diverted—to the north (home plate); the Long Island Rail Road's Bay Ridge Branch and Vesta Avenue (later renamed Van Sinderen Avenue) to the east (left field); Sutter Avenue to the south (center field); and Powell Street to the west (right field). The ballpark held 12,000 people.

It was originally the home of the Brooklyn Ward's Wonders of the Players' League in 1890. After the one-year Players' League experiment, the park became the part-time home of the Brooklyn Dodgers in 1891 and then full-time during 1892–1897, between their stints at the two versions of Washington Park.

It was here that the nickname "Trolley Dodgers", later shortened to "Dodgers", first arose. Some sources erroneously say that it was due to the need for fans to cross various trolley lines to reach the ballpark. Although the Dodgers played at Eastern Park in 1895 when the name "Trolley Dodgers" was first used, the name was based on the dangers of trolleys in Brooklyn, generally, and not trolley lines that needed to be crossed to get to the game. There were no trolley lines near Eastern Park at the time.

Eastern Park was considered difficult to reach, and although the team survived there for seven seasons, the venture there was a failure. When Charlie Ebbets acquired the Dodgers, he moved the team back, to the second version of Washington Park, which was both closer to the city center and offered a lower rent.

The park also hosted numerous college and amateur football games during its heyday, notably the Princeton–Yale game of 1890. There was also a track installed, and both bicycling and running races were held from time to time. It was also the home venue of the short-lived Brooklyn Bridegrooms Soccer Team in 1894. This was a spin-off of the Baseball Franchise that took part in an ill-fated attempt by six baseball franchises to fill their stadiums in the off season by running a soccer league. Brooklyn were top of the league when the uncompleted season was cancelled and play never resumed.

== Site today ==
The old ballpark site is now home to a mix of commercial and light industrial tenants including Gershow Recycling scrap yard.

| Preceded by Washington Park | Home of the Brooklyn Dodgers; 1891–1897 | Succeeded by Washington Park |
