= Brooklyn Ward's Wonders =

Defunct American baseball team

New York Giants
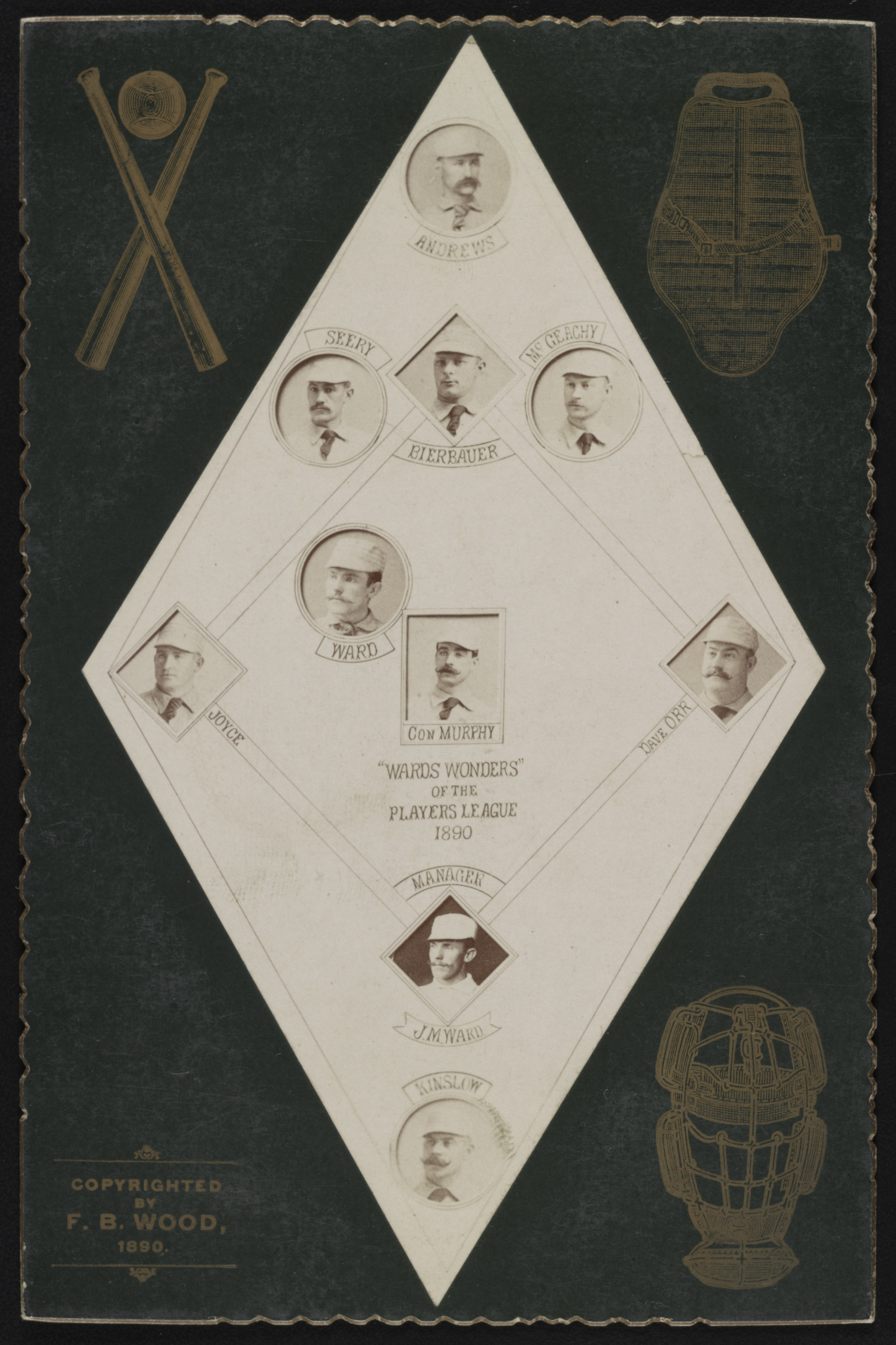
- Logo A group portrait with the caption: "WARDS WONDERS" OF THE PLAYERS LEAGUE 1890

Information
- League: Players' League (1890)
- Location: New York, New York
- Ballpark: Eastern Park (1890)
- Founded: 1890
- Folded: 1890
- Manager: John Montgomery Ward

The Brooklyn Ward's Wonders were a baseball team who played in the Players' League in 1890. The team's nickname derived from its superstar shortstop, hall of famer John Montgomery Ward. The team finished with a 76–56 record, finishing in second place. Other notable players for Brooklyn that year were Dave Orr, Lou Bierbauer, George Van Haltren, and Gus Weyhing. The team folded after the season along with the entire league. The team played its home games at Eastern Park.

== See also ==
- 1890 Brooklyn Ward's Wonders season
- Brooklyn Ward's Wonders all-time roster
