= Kansas City Cowboys (AA) all-time roster =

List of baseball players

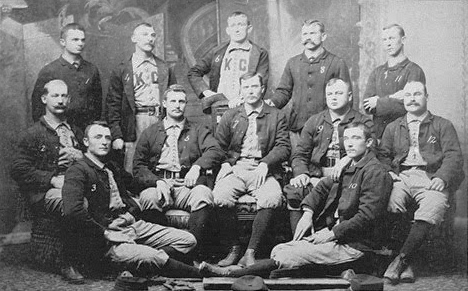
Team photograph of the 1888 Kansas City Cowboys

The Kansas City Cowboys were a professional baseball team based in Kansas City, Missouri that played in the American Association for two seasons from 1888 to 1889. The franchise initially used Association Park as their home field in 1888, then moved to Exposition Park for the 1889 season.

The team began the 1888 season with part-time outfielder Dave Rowe as their player-manager. He was released from the team after beginning the season with a win–loss record of 14–36 though 50 games. He was replaced with second baseman Sam Barkley, who did not improve the team's play, winning 22 of the next 58 games. He was replaced with non-playing manager Bill Watkins, who finished the season. Although the Cowboys completed their initial season in last place out of the league's eight teams, there were notable player achievements; on June 6, Henry Porter threw a no-hitter, and on June 13, Barkley hit for the cycle.

The franchise's only future Hall of Fame player, "Slidin' Billy" Hamilton, began his career as a part-time outfielder in 1888, and was their starting right fielder in 1889. He is the franchise's all-time leader in runs scored, bases on balls, and stolen bases. With Watkins as the team's manager in 1889, the team improved their win–loss record to 55–82, with two ties, finishing seventh among the league's eight teams. On November 15, 1889, the Cowboys submitted their resignation from the AA and joined the Western Association as the Kansas City Blues for the 1890 season.

== Players ==
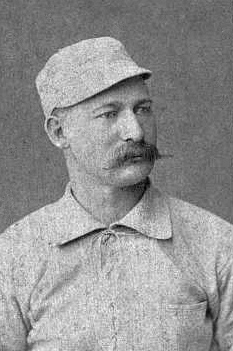
Sam Barkley was their starting second baseman and in 1888, he managed 58 games.

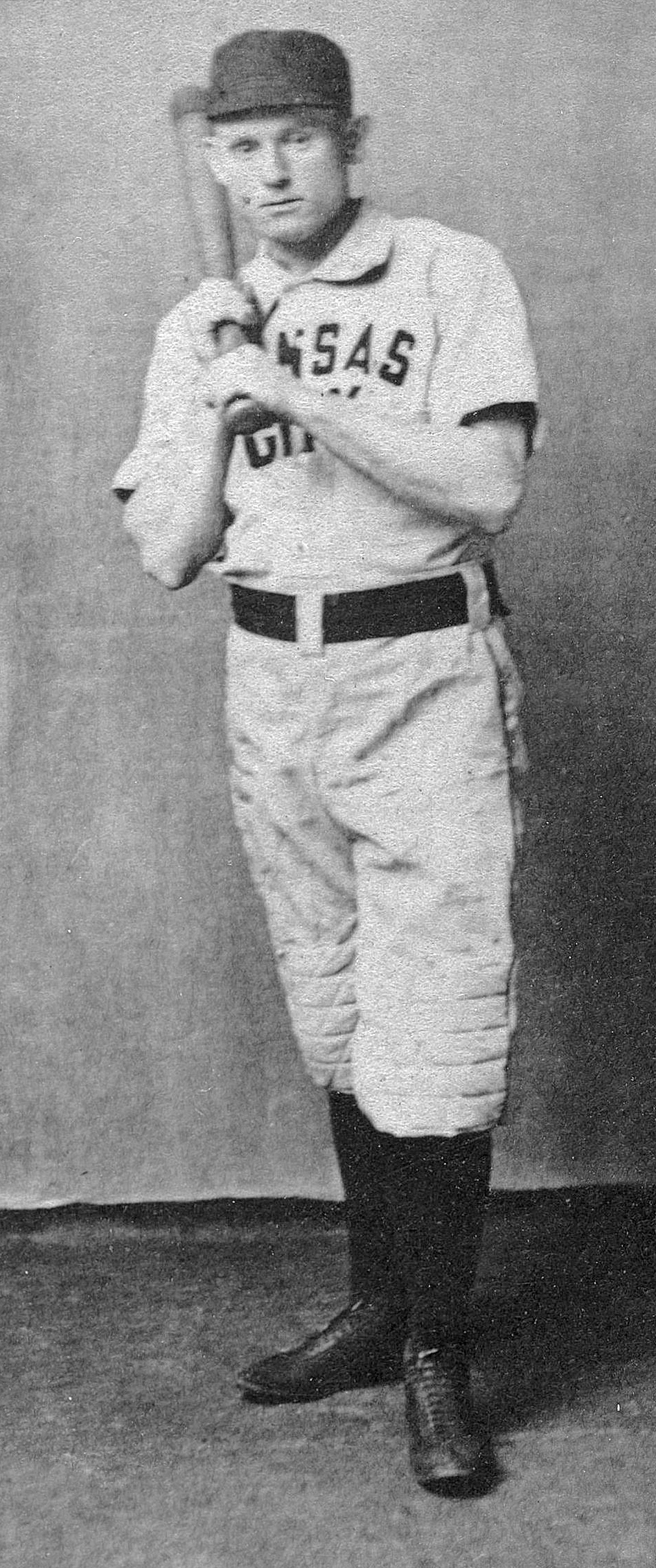
Jim Burns played center field in 1889, and he led the team with five home runs.

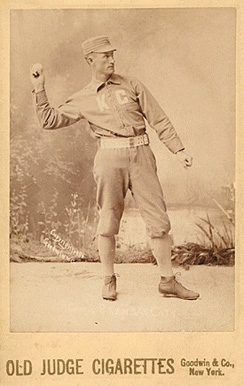
Pitcher Jim Conway won 19 games in 1889.

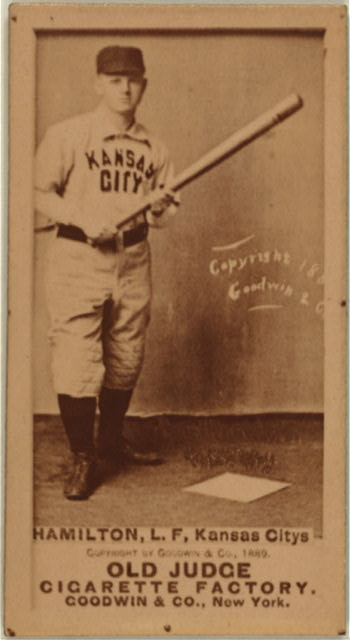
Billy Hamilton was the only player for the Cowboys to be elected to the Baseball Hall of Fame.

Herman Long played shortstop in 1889 and scored 137 runs.

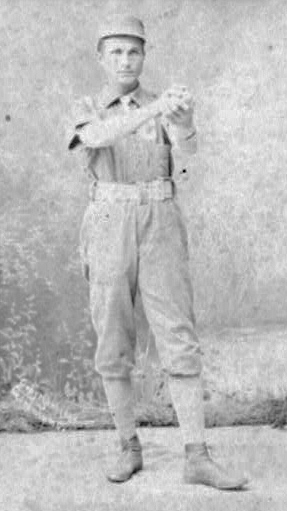
As a starting pitcher in 1889, Parke Swartzel completed 45 of his 47 games started.

Key to symbols in player table
§	Player was a player-manager
†	Inducted into the National Baseball Hall of Fame and Museum

Players who have played for the Kansas City Cowboys, primary position played, and season(s) played for franchise
Player	Position(s)	Season(s)	Notes	Ref
Myron Allen	Left fielder	1888	Allen played in 37 games for the Cowboys in his final major league season, including two as a starting pitcher.	
Billy Alvord	Third baseman	1889	Alvord played in 50 games for the Cowboys mostly as a third baseman, however he did play 16 games at two other infield positions.	
Sam Barkley^{§}	Second baseman	1888–1889	Barkley led the 1888 team with four home runs, however he finished behind Jim Burns for the franchise lead. He hit for the cycle on June 18, 1888, and was the team's player-manager for a period of 58 games following the release of Dave Rowe.	
John Bates	Pitcher	1889	His career consisted of a single game, a complete game loss on August 25, 1889. He was released from the team at the game's conclusion.	
Charlie Bell	Pitcher / Left fielder	1889	He played in the last two regular season games for the Cowboys, a complete game win on October 13, and in the outfield on October 14.	
Red Bittmann	Second baseman	1889	Bittmann played in the final four games of the Cowboys' 1889 season, his only season at the major league level.	
Jack Brennan	Catcher	1888	For the 1888 season, Brennan was the back-up catcher, and had a .169 batting average in 34 games played.	
Fatty Briody	Catcher	1888	Briody played 13 games at catcher in 1888, the eighth and final season of his career.	
Jim Burns	Center fielder	1888–1889	Burns played just 13 games for the 1888 team, but became the team's starting center fielder in 1889. He had a .304 batting average in 134 games played. His five home runs in 1889 led the team, and is good for the franchise lead. He is also the franchise all-time leader in hits and runs batted in.	
Monk Cline	Outfielder	1888	Cline had a .235 batting average in 70 games during his lone season with the Cowboys.	
Jim Conway	Pitcher	1889	Conway's 19 wins in 1889, along with Parke Swartzel, led the team, as well as sharing the franchise all-time lead in pitching victories.	
Law Daniels	Outfielder / Catcher	1888	Sold to Cowboys by the Baltimore Orioles before the 1888 season, he had a .206 batting average in 61 games. It was his last season with a major league team.	
Jumbo Davis	Third baseman	1888–1889	Sold to Cowboys by the Baltimore Orioles before the 1888 season, he was the team's third baseman for both seasons until being released from the team in August 1889.	
Jim Donahue	Catcher	1888–1889	Donahue was the team's starting catcher in 1888, then split time at the position with Charlie Hoover in 1889. When not playing catcher, he spent time in the outfield.	
Henry Easterday	Shortstop	1888	Sold to Cowboys by the Louisville Colonels before the 1888 season, he became the team's starting shortstop, and led the league in fielding percentage at his position.	
Red Ehret	Outfielder / Pitcher	1888	During his first season at the major league level, Ehret pitched in seven games, and played an additional 10 in the outfield.	
Bill Fagan	Pitcher	1888	Fagan pitched in 17 games for the Cowboys, had a 5–11 win–loss record and a 5.69 earned run average. It was his last season at the major league level.	
Ed Glenn	Left fielder	1888	He played in three games, and did not collect a hit in eight at bats.	
Joe Gunson	Catcher	1889	He played as a reserve catcher for the 1889 team, behind Jim Donahue and Charlie Hoover.	
Frank Hafner	Pitcher	1888	His career consisted of two complete game losses in May 1888.	
Billy Hamilton^{†}	Right fielder	1888–1889	Hamilton joined the team mid-season in 1888, and appeared in 35 games, and had a .264 batting average. As their starting right fielder in 1889, he led the league with 111 stolen bases. He is the only Cowboys player to be enshrined into the Baseball Hall of Fame.	
Frank Hankinson	Infielder	1888	In the final season of his 10-year career, he played in 37 games, and had a .174 batting average.	
Frank Hoffman	Pitcher	1888	His career consisted of 12 games, all complete games, with a 3–9 win–loss record.	
Charlie Hoover	Catcher	1888–1889	He played in three games during the 1888 season, however he appeared in 71 the following season when he split time as the team's starting catcher with Jim Donahue.	
Charley Jones	Left fielder	1888	In the final season of his 12-year career, he played in six games, and had a .160 batting average.	
John Kirby	Pitcher	1888	His career consisted of five games, all complete games, with a 1–4 win–loss record.	
Steve Ladew	Left fielder	1889	His major league career consisted of two games.	
Herman Long	Shortstop	1889	Long began his 16-season career with the 1889 Cowboys as their starting shortstop. He had a .275 batting average that season with 137 runs scored in 136 games.	
Jim Manning	Left fielder / Second baseman	1889	Manning appeared in 132 games during his final season at the major league level, and had a .206 batting average.	
Mike Mattimore	Left fielder	1889	The Cowboys signed Mattimore after he was released by the Philadelphia Athletics. After 19 games played, and a .160 batting average, the Cowboys released him as well.	
John McCarty	Pitcher / Outfielder	1889	In his lone season at the major league level, he had an 8–6 win–loss record and 3.91 earned run average.	
Chippy McGarr	Utility player	1889	After 25 games played, he was sold to the St. Joseph team of the Western League.	
Jim McTamany	Outfielder	1888	Normally a center fielder during his major league career, he split time in 1888 between center and right field. In 130 games played, he had a .246 batting average, and he was sold to the Columbus Solons following the season.	
Frank Pears	Pitcher	1889	He pitched in three games, and lost both games he started.	
Bill Phillips	First baseman	1888	In the last season of his ten-season career, Phillips had a .236 batting average in 129 games played, and led all AA first basemen in putouts.	
John Pickett	Utility player	1889	He had a .224 batting average in 53 games played for the Cowboys.	
Henry Porter	Pitcher	1888–1889	Porter led the franchise in many major pitching categories including games pitched, innings pitched, complete games, and shutouts. He threw the only no-hitter for the franchise on June 6, 1888.	
Charlie Reynolds	Catcher	1889	He played in one game before being sold to the Brooklyn Bridegrooms in May.	
Dave Rowe^{§}	Center fielder	1888	In the final season of his seven-year major league career, Rowe was the team's player-manager for the first 50 games of the season, and had a .172 batting average in 32 games played.	
John Sowders	Pitcher	1889	In 25 games pitched, Sowders had a 6–16 win–loss record, and a 4.82 earned run average.	
Dan Stearns	First baseman	1889	Stearns had career high totals in several different batting statistical categories. He played in a total of 139 games, and led the league among first basemen with 135 games at the position.	
Tom Sullivan	Pitcher	1888–1889	Sullivan pitched a full season in 1888, winning eight games in 25 games pitched. However, after 10 games, and two victories in 1889, he was released.	
Parke Swartzel	Pitcher	1889	In his lone season at the major league level, he started 47 games, finished one, and completed 45. His 19 wins led the team, as well as sharing the franchise all-time lead in pitching victories with Jim Conway.	
Steve Toole	Pitcher	1888	Toole had a 5–6 win–loss record in 12 games pitched, along with a 6.68 earned run average.	
