= 1889 Kansas City Cowboys season =

1889 Kansas City Cowboys
- League: American Association
- Ballpark: Exposition Park
- City: Kansas City, Missouri
- Record: 55–82 (.401)
- League place: 7th
- Manager: Bill Watkins

The 1889 Kansas City Cowboys baseball team finished with a 55–82 record, seventh place in the American Association. The team folded after the season concluded.

== Regular season ==
=== Season standings ===
American Association
| Team | W | L | Pct. | GB | Home | Road |
|---|---|---|---|---|---|---|
| Brooklyn Bridegrooms | 93 | 44 | .679 | — | 50‍–‍19 | 43‍–‍25 |
| St. Louis Browns | 90 | 45 | .667 | 2 | 51‍–‍18 | 39‍–‍27 |
| Philadelphia Athletics | 75 | 58 | .564 | 16 | 46‍–‍22 | 29‍–‍36 |
| Cincinnati Red Stockings | 76 | 63 | .547 | 18 | 47‍–‍26 | 29‍–‍37 |
| Baltimore Orioles | 70 | 65 | .519 | 22 | 40‍–‍24 | 30‍–‍41 |
| Columbus Solons | 60 | 78 | .435 | 33½ | 36‍–‍33 | 24‍–‍45 |
| Kansas City Cowboys | 55 | 82 | .401 | 38 | 35‍–‍35 | 20‍–‍47 |
| Louisville Colonels | 27 | 111 | .196 | 66½ | 18‍–‍46 | 9‍–‍65 |

=== Record vs. opponents ===
1889 American Association record Sources:
| Team | BAL | BRO | CIN | COL | KC | LOU | PHA | STL |
|---|---|---|---|---|---|---|---|---|
| Baltimore | — | 8–12 | 8–11–2 | 12–8 | 11–7 | 16–4 | 8–11 | 7–12–2 |
| Brooklyn | 12–8 | — | 15–5 | 11–8–2 | 16–4 | 19–1 | 12–7–1 | 8–11 |
| Cincinnati | 11–8–2 | 5–15 | — | 11–9 | 14–6 | 18–2 | 9–11 | 8–12 |
| Columbus | 8–12 | 8–11–2 | 9–11 | — | 9–11 | 13–7 | 7–12 | 6–14 |
| Kansas City | 7–11 | 4–16 | 6–14 | 11–9 | — | 13–6 | 8–12–1 | 6–14–1 |
| Louisville | 4–16 | 1–19 | 2–18 | 7–13 | 6–13 | — | 5–14–1 | 2–18–1 |
| Philadelphia | 11–8 | 7–12–1 | 11–9 | 12–7 | 12–8–1 | 14–5–1 | — | 8–9–2 |
| St. Louis | 12–7–2 | 11–8 | 12–8 | 14–6 | 14–6–1 | 18–2–1 | 9–8–2 | — |

=== Roster ===
1889 Kansas City Cowboys
Roster
| Pitchers: John Bates; Jim Conway; John McCarty; Frank Pears; Henry Porter; John Sowders; Tom Sullivan; Parke Swartzel | Catchers: Jim Donahue; Joe Gunson; Charlie Hoover; Charlie Reynolds; Infielders: Billy Alvord; Sam Barkley; Red Bittmann; Jumbo Davis; Herman Long; Chippy McGarr; Dan Stearns | Outfielders: Charlie Bell; Jim Burns; Billy Hamilton; Steve Ladew; Jim Manning; Mike Mattimore; John Pickett | Manager: Bill Watkins |

== Player stats ==
=== Batting ===
==== Starters by position ====
Note: Pos = Position; G = Games played; AB = At bats; H = Hits; Avg. = Batting average; HR = Home runs; RBI = Runs batted in

| Pos | Player | G | AB | H | Avg. | HR | RBI |
|---|---|---|---|---|---|---|---|
| C | Charlie Hoover | 71 | 258 | 64 | .248 | 1 | 25 |
| 1B | Dan Stearns | 139 | 560 | 160 | .286 | 3 | 87 |
| 2B | Sam Barkley | 45 | 176 | 50 | .284 | 0 | 23 |
| SS | Herman Long | 136 | 574 | 158 | .275 | 3 | 60 |
| 3B | Jumbo Davis | 62 | 241 | 64 | .266 | 0 | 30 |
| OF | Jim Manning | 132 | 506 | 103 | .204 | 3 | 68 |
| OF | Jim Burns | 134 | 579 | 176 | .304 | 5 | 97 |
| OF | Billy Hamilton | 137 | 534 | 161 | .301 | 3 | 77 |

==== Other batters ====
Note: G = Games played; AB = At bats; H = Hits; Avg. = Batting average; HR = Home runs; RBI = Runs batted in

| Player | G | AB | H | Avg. | HR | RBI |
|---|---|---|---|---|---|---|
| Jim Donahue | 67 | 252 | 59 | .234 | 0 | 32 |
| John Pickett | 53 | 201 | 45 | .224 | 0 | 12 |
| Billy Alvord | 50 | 186 | 43 | .231 | 0 | 18 |
| Joe Gunson | 34 | 122 | 24 | .197 | 0 | 12 |
| Chippy McGarr | 25 | 108 | 31 | .287 | 0 | 16 |
| Mike Mattimore | 19 | 75 | 12 | .160 | 0 | 5 |
| Red Bittman | 4 | 14 | 4 | .286 | 0 | 2 |
| Steve Ladew | 2 | 4 | 0 | .000 | 0 | 0 |
| Charlie Reynolds | 1 | 4 | 1 | .250 | 0 | 1 |

=== Pitching ===
==== Starting pitchers ====
Note: G = Games pitched; IP = Innings pitched; W = Wins; L = Losses; ERA = Earned run average; SO = Strikeouts

| Player | G | IP | W | L | ERA | SO |
|---|---|---|---|---|---|---|
| Park Swartzel | 48 | 410.1 | 19 | 27 | 4.32 | 147 |
| Jim Conway | 41 | 335.0 | 19 | 19 | 3.25 | 115 |
| John Sowders | 25 | 185.0 | 6 | 16 | 4.82 | 104 |
| John McCarty | 15 | 119.2 | 8 | 6 | 3.91 | 36 |
| Tom Sullivan | 10 | 87.1 | 2 | 8 | 5.67 | 24 |
| Henry Porter | 4 | 23.0 | 0 | 3 | 12.52 | 9 |
| Charlie Bell | 1 | 9.0 | 1 | 0 | 1.00 | 3 |
| John Bates | 1 | 8.0 | 0 | 1 | 13.50 | 3 |

==== Other pitchers ====
Note: G = Games pitched; IP = Innings pitched; W = Wins; L = Losses; ERA = Earned run average; SO = Strikeouts

| Player | G | IP | W | L | ERA | SO |
|---|---|---|---|---|---|---|
| Frank Pears | 3 | 22.0 | 0 | 2 | 4.91 | 5 |

==== Relief pitchers ====
Note: G = Games pitched; W = Wins; L = Losses; SV = Saves; ERA = Earned run average; SO = Strikeouts

| Player | G | W | L | SV | ERA | SO |
|---|---|---|---|---|---|---|
| Mike Mattimore | 1 | 0 | 0 | 0 | 3.00 | 1 |
| Steve Ladew | 1 | 0 | 0 | 0 | 4.50 | 0 |
