= 1889 Baltimore Orioles season =

1889 Baltimore Orioles
- League: American Association
- Ballpark: Oriole Park
- City: Baltimore, Maryland
- Record: 70–65 (.519)
- League place: 5th
- Owner: Harry Von der Horst
- Manager: Billy Barnie

== Regular season ==
=== Season standings ===
American Association
Team	W	L	Pct.	GB	Home	Road
Brooklyn Bridegrooms	93	44	.679	—	50‍–‍19	43‍–‍25
St. Louis Browns	90	45	.667	2	51‍–‍18	39‍–‍27
Philadelphia Athletics	75	58	.564	16	46‍–‍22	29‍–‍36
Cincinnati Red Stockings	76	63	.547	18	47‍–‍26	29‍–‍37
Baltimore Orioles	70	65	.519	22	40‍–‍24	30‍–‍41
Columbus Solons	60	78	.435	33½	36‍–‍33	24‍–‍45
Kansas City Cowboys	55	82	.401	38	35‍–‍35	20‍–‍47
Louisville Colonels	27	111	.196	66½	18‍–‍46	9‍–‍65

=== Record vs. opponents ===
1889 American Association record Sources:
Team	BAL	BRO	CIN	COL	KC	LOU	PHA	STL
Baltimore	—	8–12	8–11–2	12–8	11–7	16–4	8–11	7–12–2
Brooklyn	12–8	—	15–5	11–8–2	16–4	19–1	12–7–1	8–11
Cincinnati	11–8–2	5–15	—	11–9	14–6	18–2	9–11	8–12
Columbus	8–12	8–11–2	9–11	—	9–11	13–7	7–12	6–14
Kansas City	7–11	4–16	6–14	11–9	—	13–6	8–12–1	6–14–1
Louisville	4–16	1–19	2–18	7–13	6–13	—	5–14–1	2–18–1
Philadelphia	11–8	7–12–1	11–9	12–7	12–8–1	14–5–1	—	8–9–2
St. Louis	12–7–2	11–8	12–8	14–6	14–6–1	18–2–1	9–8–2	—

=== Roster ===
1889 Baltimore Orioles
Roster
Pitchers: Bert Cunningham; Frank Foreman; George Goetz; Matt Kilroy; Pat Whitaker; Catchers: Bart Cantz; Tom Quinn; Pop Tate	Infielders: Jack Farrell; Will Holland; John Kerins; Reddy Mack; Chippy McGarr; Dusty Miller; Irv Ray; Billy Shindle; Tommy Tucker	Outfielders: Joe Dowie; Chris Fulmer; Mike Griffin; Joe Hornung; Joe Sommer; George Wood	Manager: Billy Barnie

== Player stats ==
=== Batting ===
==== Starters by position ====
Note: Pos = Position; G = Games played; AB = At bats; H = Hits; Avg. = Batting average; HR = Home runs; RBI = Runs batted in

Pos	Player	G	AB	H	Avg.	HR	RBI
C	Pop Tate	72	253	46	.182	1	27
1B	Tommy Tucker	134	527	196	.372	5	99
2B	Reddy Mack	136	519	125	.241	1	87
SS	Jack Farrell	42	157	33	.210	1	26
3B	Billy Shindle	134	567	178	.314	3	63
OF	Mike Griffin	137	531	148	.279	4	48
OF	Joe Sommer	106	386	85	.220	1	36
OF	Joe Hornung	135	533	122	.229	1	78

==== Other batters ====
Note: G = Games played; AB = At bats; H = Hits; Avg. = Batting average; HR = Home runs; RBI = Runs batted in

Player	G	AB	H	Avg.	HR	RBI
Tom Quinn	55	194	34	.175	1	15
Will Holland	40	143	27	.189	0	16
Irv Ray	26	106	36	.340	0	17
Joe Dowie	20	75	17	.227	0	8
Bart Cantz	20	69	12	.174	0	8
Chris Fulmer	16	58	15	.259	0	13
John Kerins	16	53	15	.283	0	12
Dusty Miller	11	40	6	.150	0	6
George Wood	3	10	2	.200	0	1
Chippy McGarr	3	7	1	.143	0	0

=== Pitching ===
==== Starting pitchers ====
Note: G = Games pitched; IP = Innings pitched; W = Wins; L = Losses; ERA = Earned run average; SO = Strikeouts

Player	G	IP	W	L	ERA	SO
Matt Kilroy	59	480.2	29	25	2.85	217
Frank Foreman	51	414.0	23	21	3.52	180
Bert Cunningham	39	279.1	16	19	4.87	140
George Goetz	1	9.0	1	0	4.00	2
Pat Whitaker	1	9.0	1	0	2.00	1
