= 1889 Cincinnati Red Stockings season =

1889 Cincinnati Red Stockings
- League: American Association
- Ballpark: American Park
- City: Cincinnati
- Record: 76–63 (.547)
- League place: 4th
- Owner: Aaron S. Stern
- Manager: Gus Schmelz

The 1889 Cincinnati Red Stockings season was a season in American baseball. The team finished in fourth place in the American Association with a record of 76–63, 18 games behind the Brooklyn Bridegrooms.

== Regular season ==
The Red Stockings brought back manager Gus Schmelz for a third season in 1889, as he led the team to two straight seasons of 80 or more victories. Cincinnati would have a new shortstop, signing local area player Ollie Beard to his first contract. Cincinnati also signed rookie Bug Holliday, who would play in the outfield. On the mound, another rookie, Jesse Duryea, would join the Red Stockings.

Bug Holliday had an excellent rookie season, hitting .321 with a league high nineteen home runs and a franchise record 104 RBI. George Tebeau hit .252 with seven homers and 70 RBI, while scoring a team high 110 runs. Hugh Nicol once again led Cincinnati in stolen bases, however, he failed to crack 100 for the first time since joining the team, as he stole 80 bases.

Jesse Duryea was the ace of the Red Stockings staff, going 32–19 with a 2.56 ERA in 53 games. Lee Viau had a 22–20 record with a 3.79 ERA, while Tony Mullane was 11–9 with a 2.99 ERA.

=== Season summary ===
Cincinnati began the season badly, as they lost their first four games, and were 5–10 in their first fifteen games. The Red Stockings responded by going 16–6 in their next 22 games to climb into third place, however, the team lost their next seven games to fall under .500 once again and into sixth place. Cincinnati would never be a factor in the pennant race, finishing in fourth place with a 76–63 record, eighteen games behind the Brooklyn Bridegrooms.

=== Season standings ===
American Association
| Team | W | L | Pct. | GB | Home | Road |
|---|---|---|---|---|---|---|
| Brooklyn Bridegrooms | 93 | 44 | .679 | — | 50‍–‍19 | 43‍–‍25 |
| St. Louis Browns | 90 | 45 | .667 | 2 | 51‍–‍18 | 39‍–‍27 |
| Philadelphia Athletics | 75 | 58 | .564 | 16 | 46‍–‍22 | 29‍–‍36 |
| Cincinnati Red Stockings | 76 | 63 | .547 | 18 | 47‍–‍26 | 29‍–‍37 |
| Baltimore Orioles | 70 | 65 | .519 | 22 | 40‍–‍24 | 30‍–‍41 |
| Columbus Solons | 60 | 78 | .435 | 33½ | 36‍–‍33 | 24‍–‍45 |
| Kansas City Cowboys | 55 | 82 | .401 | 38 | 35‍–‍35 | 20‍–‍47 |
| Louisville Colonels | 27 | 111 | .196 | 66½ | 18‍–‍46 | 9‍–‍65 |

=== Record vs. opponents ===
1889 American Association record Sources:
| Team | BAL | BRO | CIN | COL | KC | LOU | PHA | STL |
|---|---|---|---|---|---|---|---|---|
| Baltimore | — | 8–12 | 8–11–2 | 12–8 | 11–7 | 16–4 | 8–11 | 7–12–2 |
| Brooklyn | 12–8 | — | 15–5 | 11–8–2 | 16–4 | 19–1 | 12–7–1 | 8–11 |
| Cincinnati | 11–8–2 | 5–15 | — | 11–9 | 14–6 | 18–2 | 9–11 | 8–12 |
| Columbus | 8–12 | 8–11–2 | 9–11 | — | 9–11 | 13–7 | 7–12 | 6–14 |
| Kansas City | 7–11 | 4–16 | 6–14 | 11–9 | — | 13–6 | 8–12–1 | 6–14–1 |
| Louisville | 4–16 | 1–19 | 2–18 | 7–13 | 6–13 | — | 5–14–1 | 2–18–1 |
| Philadelphia | 11–8 | 7–12–1 | 11–9 | 12–7 | 12–8–1 | 14–5–1 | — | 8–9–2 |
| St. Louis | 12–7–2 | 11–8 | 12–8 | 14–6 | 14–6–1 | 18–2–1 | 9–8–2 | — |

=== Game log ===
Legend
| Red Stockings Win | Red Stockings Loss | Game Tied/Postponed |

1889 Game Log: 76–63 (Home: 47–26; Away: 29–37)
April: 4–8 (Home: 3–4; Away: 1–4)

| # | Date | Opponent | Score | Stadium | Attendance | Record | Streak |
|---|---|---|---|---|---|---|---|
| 1 | April 17 | Browns | 1–5 | American Park | 15,000 | 0-1 | L1 |
| 2 | April 18 | Browns | 4–12 | American Park | 4,000 | 0-2 | L2 |
| 3 | April 19 | Browns | 3–4 | American Park | N/A | 0-3 | L3 |
| 4 | April 20 | Browns | 0–2 | American Park | N/A | 0-4 | L4 |
| 5 | April 21 | Cowboys | 7–6 | American Park | N/A | 1-4 | W1 |
| 6 | April 22 | Cowboys | 10–1 | American Park | N/A | 2-4 | W2 |
| 7 | April 23 | Cowboys | 7–5 | American Park | N/A | 3-4 | W3 |
| 8 | April 25 | @ Browns | 5–10 | Sportsman's Park | N/A | 3-5 | L1 |
| 9 | April 26 | @ Browns | 2–8 | Sportsman's Park | N/A | 3-6 | L2 |
| 10 | April 27 | @ Browns | 12–10 | Sportsman's Park | N/A | 4-6 | W1 |
| 11 | April 28 | @ Browns | 2–5 | Sportsman's Park | N/A | 4-7 | L2 |
| - | April 29 | @ Cowboys | Postponed (rain); Makeup: September 27 | | | | |
| 12 | April 30 | @ Cowboys | 6–8 | Exposition Park | N/A | 4-8 | L3 |

May: 17–9 (Home: 13–5; Away: 4–4)

| # | Date | Opponent | Score | Stadium | Attendance | Record | Streak |
|---|---|---|---|---|---|---|---|
| 13 | May 1 | @ Cowboys | 14–3 | Exposition Park | N/A | 5-8 | W1 |
| 14 | May 2 | @ Cowboys | 2–3 | Exposition Park | N/A | 5-9 | L1 |
| 15 | May 4 | Colonels | 2–8 | American Park | N/A | 5-10 | L2 |
| 16 | May 5 | Colonels | 12–5 | American Park | N/A | 6-10 | W1 |
| 17 | May 6 | Colonels | 8–7 | American Park | N/A | 7-10 | W2 |
| 18 | May 7 | Athletics | 1–7 | American Park | N/A | 7-11 | L1 |
| 19 | May 8 | Athletics | 6–2 | American Park | N/A | 8-11 | W1 |
| 20 | May 9 | Athletics | 14–6 | American Park | N/A | 9-11 | W2 |
| 21 | May 10 | Athletics | 10–0 | American Park | N/A | 10-11 | W3 |
| - | May 11 | Bridegrooms | Postponed (rain); Makeup: May 15 | | | | |
| 22 | May 12 | Bridegrooms | 7–10 | American Park | N/A | 10-12 | L1 |
| - | May 13 | Bridegrooms | Postponed (rain); Makeup: July 16 | | | | |
| 23 | May 14 | Bridegrooms | 0–4 | American Park | N/A | 10-13 | L2 |
| 24 | May 15 | Bridegrooms | 6–10 | American Park | N/A | 10-14 | L3 |
| 25 | May 16 | Orioles | 4–2 | American Park | N/A | 11-14 | W1 |
| 26 | May 17 | Orioles | 14–5 | American Park | N/A | 12-14 | W2 |
| 27 | May 18 | Orioles | 7–5 | American Park | N/A | 13-14 | W3 |
| 28 | May 19 | Orioles | 8–5 | American Park | N/A | 14-14 | W4 |
| - | May 20 | Solons | Postponed (site change); Makeup: May 20 | | | | |
| 29 | May 20 | @ Solons | 0–2 | Recreation Park | N/A | 14-15 | L1 |
| - | May 21 | Solons | Postponed (site change); Makeup: May 21 | | | | |
| 30 | May 21 | @ Solons | 13–10 | Recreation Park | N/A | 15-15 | W1 |
| - | May 22 | Solons | Postponed (cold, site change); Makeup: May 24 | | | | |
| - | May 23 | Solons | Postponed (site change); Makeup: May 23 | | | | |
| 31 | May 23 | @ Solons | 5–4 | Recreation Park | N/A | 16-15 | W2 |
| 32 | May 24 | @ Solons | 4–0 | Recreation Park | N/A | 17-15 | W3 |
| - | May 25 | @ Colonels | Postponed (site change); Makeup: May 26 | | | | |
| - | May 26 | @ Colonels | Postponed (site change); Makeup: May 26 | | | | |
| 33 | May 26 1 | Colonels | 8–7 | American Park | N/A | 18-15 | W4 |
| 34 | May 26 2 | Colonels | 16–4 | American Park | N/A | 19-15 | W5 |
| - | May 27 | @ Colonels | Postponed (site change); Makeup: May 27 | | | | |
| 35 | May 27 | Colonels | 10–9 | American Park | N/A | 20-15 | W6 |
| - | May 28 | @ Colonels | Postponed (site change); Makeup: May 28 | | | | |
| 36 | May 28 | Colonels | 13–12 | American Park | N/A | 21-15 | W7 |
| 37 | May 30 1 | @ Athletics | 0–3 | Jefferson Street Grounds | N/A | 21-16 | L1 |
| 38 | May 30 2 | @ Athletics | 1–6 | Jefferson Street Grounds | N/A | 21-17 | L2 |
| - | May 31 | @ Athletics | Postponed (rain); Makeup: May 30 | | | | |

June: 10–10 (Home: 5–0; Away: 5–10)

| # | Date | Opponent | Score | Stadium | Attendance | Record | Streak |
|---|---|---|---|---|---|---|---|
| 39 | June 1 | @ Athletics | 4–8 | Jefferson Street Grounds | N/A | 21-18 | L3 |
| 40 | June 2 | @ Athletics | 2–4 | Jefferson Street Grounds | N/A | 21-19 | L4 |
| 41 | June 3 | @ Orioles | 2–7 | Oriole Park | N/A | 21-20 | L5 |
| 42 | June 4 | @ Orioles | 2–3 | Oriole Park | N/A | 21-21 | L6 |
| 43 | June 5 | @ Orioles | 6–13 | Oriole Park | N/A | 21-22 | L7 |
| 44 | June 6 | @ Orioles | 10–3 | Oriole Park | N/A | 22-22 | W1 |
| - | June 8 | @ Solons | Postponed (rain); Makeup: August 1 | | | | |
| 45 | June 9 | @ Solons | 4–17 | Recreation Park | N/A | 22-23 | L1 |
| - | June 10 | @ Solons | Postponed (site change); Makeup: July 9 | | | | |
| - | June 11 | @ Solons | Postponed (site change); Makeup: June 11 | | | | |
| 46 | June 11 | Solons | 5–2 | American Park | N/A | 23-23 | W1 |
| 47 | June 13 | @ Bridegrooms | 1–2 | Washington Park | N/A | 23-24 | L1 |
| 48 | June 14 | @ Bridegrooms | 4–7 | Washington Park | N/A | 23-25 | L2 |
| - | June 15 | @ Bridegrooms | Postponed (rain); Makeup: September 2 | | | | |
| 49 | June 16 | @ Bridegrooms | 4–3 | Washington Park | N/A | 24-25 | W1 |
| 50 | June 20 | Cowboys | 5–4 | American Park | N/A | 25-25 | W2 |
| 51 | June 21 | Cowboys | 9–2 | American Park | N/A | 26-25 | W3 |
| 52 | June 22 | Cowboys | 11–3 | American Park | N/A | 27-25 | W4 |
| 53 | June 23 | Cowboys | 15–7 | American Park | N/A | 28-25 | W5 |
| 54 | June 25 | @ Browns | 3–7 | Sportsman's Park | N/A | 28-26 | L1 |
| 55 | June 26 | @ Browns | 6–1 | Sportsman's Park | N/A | 29-26 | W1 |
| 56 | June 27 | @ Browns | 8–6 | Sportsman's Park | N/A | 30-26 | W2 |
| 57 | June 29 | @ Cowboys | 3–9 | Exposition Park | N/A | 30-27 | L1 |
| 58 | June 30 | @ Cowboys | 9–3 | Exposition Park | N/A | 31-27 | W1 |

July: 14–11 (Home: 10–7; Away: 4–4)

| # | Date | Opponent | Score | Stadium | Attendance | Record | Streak |
|---|---|---|---|---|---|---|---|
| 59 | July 1 | @ Cowboys | 3–6 | Exposition Park | N/A | 31-28 | L1 |
| 60 | July 3 | Orioles | 3–3 | American Park | N/A | 31-28 | L1 |
| 61 | July 4 1 | Orioles | 0–8 | American Park | N/A | 31-29 | L2 |
| 62 | July 4 2 | Orioles | 11–5 | American Park | N/A | 32-29 | W1 |
| 63 | July 5 | Orioles | 10–9 | American Park | N/A | 33-29 | W2 |
| 64 | July 6 | Athletics | 5–2 | American Park | N/A | 34-29 | W3 |
| 65 | July 7 | Athletics | 5–6 | American Park | N/A | 34-30 | L1 |
| 66 | July 8 | Athletics | 11–3 | American Park | N/A | 35-30 | W1 |
| 67 | July 9 | Solons | 16–10 | American Park | N/A | 36-30 | W2 |
| 68 | July 10 | Solons | 4–2 | American Park | N/A | 37-30 | W3 |
| 69 | July 11 | Solons | 4–7 | American Park | N/A | 37-31 | L1 |
| 70 | July 12 | Solons | 6–5 | American Park | N/A | 38-31 | W1 |
| 71 | July 13 | Bridegrooms | 5–15 | American Park | N/A | 38-32 | L1 |
| - | July 14 | Bridegrooms | Postponed (rain); Makeup: August 23 | | | | |
| 72 | July 15 | Bridegrooms | 4–6 | American Park | N/A | 38-33 | L2 |
| 73 | July 16 | Bridegrooms | 4–3 | American Park | N/A | 39-33 | W1 |
| 74 | July 18 | Browns | 5–1 | American Park | N/A | 40-33 | W2 |
| 75 | July 20 | Browns | 1–5 | American Park | N/A | 40-34 | L1 |
| 76 | July 21 | Browns | 10–1 | American Park | N/A | 41-34 | W1 |
| 77 | July 23 | @ Athletics | 9–1 | Jefferson Street Grounds | N/A | 42-34 | W2 |
| 78 | July 24 | @ Athletics | 6–5 | Jefferson Street Grounds | N/A | 43-34 | W3 |
| 79 | July 25 | @ Athletics | 10–6 | Jefferson Street Grounds | N/A | 44-34 | W4 |
| 80 | July 26 | @ Bridegrooms | 6–20 | Washington Park | N/A | 44-35 | L1 |
| 81 | July 27 | @ Bridegrooms | 2–6 | Washington Park | N/A | 44-36 | L2 |
| 82 | July 28 | @ Bridegrooms | 2–1 | Washington Park | N/A | 45-36 | W1 |
| - | July 29 | @ Solons | Postponed (site change); Makeup: August 21 | | | | |
| - | July 30 | @ Solons | Postponed (site change); Makeup: July 30 | | | | |
| 83 | July 30 | Solons | 3–4 | American Park | N/A | 45-37 | L1 |
| 84 | July 31 | @ Solons | 5–6 | Recreation Park | N/A | 45-38 | L2 |

August: 13–12 (Home: 8–8; Away: 5–4)

| # | Date | Opponent | Score | Stadium | Attendance | Record | Streak |
|---|---|---|---|---|---|---|---|
| 85 | August 1 | @ Solons | 16–5 | Recreation Park | N/A | 46-38 | W1 |
| 86 | August 2 | @ Orioles | 3–5 | Oriole Park | N/A | 46-39 | L1 |
| 87 | August 3 | @ Orioles | 2–6 | Oriole Park | N/A | 46-40 | L2 |
| 88 | August 5 | @ Orioles | 3–2 | Oriole Park | N/A | 47-40 | W1 |
| 89 | August 7 | @ Colonels | 5–4 | Eclipse Park | N/A | 48-40 | W2 |
| 90 | August 8 | @ Colonels | 4–3 | Eclipse Park | N/A | 49-40 | W3 |
| 91 | August 9 | @ Colonels | 15–8 | Eclipse Park | N/A | 50-40 | W4 |
| 92 | August 10 | Orioles | 20–0 | American Park | N/A | 51-40 | W5 |
| 93 | August 11 | Orioles | 3–4 | American Park | N/A | 51-41 | L1 |
| 94 | August 12 | Orioles | 6–7 | American Park | N/A | 51-42 | L2 |
| 95 | August 13 | Athletics | 4–10 | American Park | N/A | 51-43 | L3 |
| 96 | August 14 | Athletics | 7–6 | American Park | N/A | 52-43 | W1 |
| 97 | August 15 | Athletics | 9–10 | American Park | N/A | 52-44 | L1 |
| 98 | August 17 | Solons | 9–3 | American Park | N/A | 53-44 | W1 |
| - | August 18 | Solons | Postponed (Sunday game stopped); Makeup: August 19 | | | | |
| 99 | August 19 | Solons | 3–4 | American Park | N/A | 53-45 | L1 |
| 100 | August 20 | Solons | 2–3 | American Park | N/A | 53-46 | L2 |
| 101 | August 21 | Solons | 9–3 | American Park | N/A | 54-46 | W1 |
| 102 | August 22 | Bridegrooms | 18–5 | American Park | N/A | 55-46 | W2 |
| 103 | August 23 | Bridegrooms | 4–10 | American Park | N/A | 55-47 | L1 |
| 104 | August 24 | Bridegrooms | 4–6 | American Park | N/A | 55-48 | L2 |
| - | August 25 | Bridegrooms | Postponed (Sunday game stopped, site change); Makeup: September 5 | | | | |
| 105 | August 26 | Colonels | 19–6 | American Park | N/A | 56-48 | W1 |
| 106 | August 27 | Colonels | 10–4 | American Park | N/A | 57-48 | W2 |
| 107 | August 28 | Colonels | 6–4 | American Park | N/A | 58-48 | W3 |
| 108 | August 30 | @ Athletics | 1–7 | Jefferson Street Grounds | N/A | 58-49 | L1 |
| 109 | August 31 | @ Athletics | 2–7 | Jefferson Street Grounds | N/A | 58-50 | L2 |

September: 10–11 (Home: 0–0; Away: 10–11)

| # | Date | Opponent | Score | Stadium | Attendance | Record | Streak |
|---|---|---|---|---|---|---|---|
| 110 | September 1 | @ Athletics | 0–4 | Jefferson Street Grounds | N/A | 58-51 | L3 |
| 111 | September 2 1 | @ Bridegrooms | 4–7 | Washington Park | N/A | 58-52 | L4 |
| 112 | September 2 2 | @ Bridegrooms | 11–4 | Washington Park | N/A | 59-52 | W1 |
| 113 | September 3 | @ Bridegrooms | 8–13 | Washington Park | 2,600 | 59-53 | L1 |
| 114 | September 4 | @ Bridegrooms | 1–12 | Washington Park | N/A | 59-54 | L2 |
| 115 | September 5 | @ Bridegrooms | 3–6 | Washington Park | N/A | 59-55 | L3 |
| 116 | September 7 | @ Orioles | 5–5 | Oriole Park | N/A | 59-55 | L3 |
| 117 | September 9 | @ Orioles | 12–8 | Oriole Park | N/A | 60-55 | W1 |
| 118 | September 10 | @ Orioles | 6–3 | Oriole Park | N/A | 61-55 | W2 |
| 119 | September 12 | @ Solons | 1–12 | Recreation Park | N/A | 61-56 | L1 |
| 120 | September 14 | @ Solons | 1–9 | Recreation Park | N/A | 61-57 | L2 |
| 121 | September 15 | @ Solons | 4–1 | Recreation Park | N/A | 62-57 | W1 |
| 122 | September 17 | @ Colonels | 5–1 | Eclipse Park | N/A | 63-57 | W2 |
| 123 | September 18 | @ Colonels | 4–3 | Eclipse Park | N/A | 64-57 | W3 |
| 124 | September 19 | @ Colonels | 0–8 | Eclipse Park | N/A | 64-58 | L1 |
| 125 | September 21 | @ Browns | 5–4 | Sportsman's Park | N/A | 65-58 | W1 |
| 126 | September 22 | @ Browns | 17–6 | Sportsman's Park | N/A | 66-58 | W2 |
| 127 | September 23 | @ Browns | 1–5 | Sportsman's Park | N/A | 66-59 | L1 |
| 128 | September 26 | @ Cowboys | 6–8 | Exposition Park | N/A | 66-60 | L2 |
| 129 | September 27 | @ Cowboys | 16–8 | Exposition Park | N/A | 67-60 | W1 |
| 130 | September 28 | @ Cowboys | 7–9 | Exposition Park | N/A | 67-61 | L1 |
| - | September 29 | @ Cowboys | Postponed (rain); Makeup: September 30 | | | | |
| 131 | September 30 | @ Cowboys | 9–8 | Exposition Park | N/A | 68-61 | W1 |

October: 8–2 (Home: 8–2; Away: 0–0)

| # | Date | Opponent | Score | Stadium | Attendance | Record | Streak |
|---|---|---|---|---|---|---|---|
| 132 | October 3 | Colonels | 14–3 | American Park | N/A | 69-61 | W2 |
| 133 | October 4 | Colonels | 9–2 | American Park | N/A | 70-61 | W3 |
| 134 | October 5 | Colonels | 8–1 | American Park | N/A | 71-61 | W4 |
| - | October 6 | Colonels | Postponed (Sunday game stopped); Makeup: October 7 | | | | |
| 135 | October 7 | Colonels | 9–3 | American Park | N/A | 72-61 | W5 |
| 136 | October 8 | Cowboys | 10–3 | American Park | N/A | 73-61 | W6 |
| 137 | October 9 | Cowboys | 13–1 | American Park | N/A | 74-61 | W7 |
| 138 | October 10 | Cowboys | 10–2 | American Park | N/A | 75-61 | W8 |
| - | October 12 | Browns | Postponed (wet grounds); Makeup: October 15 | | | | |
| - | October 13 | Browns | Postponed (rain); Makeup: October 15 | | | | |
| 139 | October 14 | Browns | 1–5 | American Park | 3,000 | 75-62 | L1 |
| 140 | October 15 1 | Browns | 8–3 | American Park | N/A | 76-62 | W1 |
| 141 | October 15 2 | Browns | 1–2 | American Park | N/A | 76-63 | L1 |

=== Roster ===
1889 Cincinnati Red Stockings
Roster
| Pitchers: Theodore Conover; Jesse Duryea; Tony Mullane; Charlie Petty; Mike Smith; Lee Viau | Catchers: Kid Baldwin; Jim Keenan; Infielders: Ollie Beard; Hick Carpenter; Bid McPhee; John Reilly | Outfielders: Billy Earle; Bug Holliday; Hugh Nicol; George Tebeau | Manager: Gus Schmelz |

== Player stats ==
=== Batting ===
==== Starters by position ====
Note: Pos = Position; G = Games played; AB = At bats; H = Hits; Avg. = Batting average; HR = Home runs; RBI = Runs batted in

| Pos | Player | G | AB | H | Avg. | HR | RBI |
|---|---|---|---|---|---|---|---|
| C | Jim Keenan | 87 | 300 | 86 | .287 | 6 | 60 |
| 1B | John Reilly | 111 | 427 | 111 | .260 | 5 | 66 |
| 2B | Bid McPhee | 135 | 540 | 145 | .269 | 5 | 57 |
| SS | Ollie Beard | 141 | 558 | 159 | .285 | 1 | 77 |
| 3B | Hick Carpenter | 123 | 486 | 127 | .261 | 0 | 63 |
| OF | Hugh Nicol | 122 | 474 | 121 | .255 | 2 | 58 |
| OF | Bug Holliday | 135 | 563 | 181 | .321 | 19 | 104 |
| OF | George Tebeau | 135 | 496 | 125 | .252 | 7 | 70 |

==== Other batters ====
Note: G = Games played; AB = At bats; H = Hits; Avg. = Batting average; HR = Home runs; RBI = Runs batted in

| Player | G | AB | H | Avg. | HR | RBI |
|---|---|---|---|---|---|---|
| Kid Baldwin | 60 | 223 | 55 | .247 | 1 | 34 |
| Billy Earle | 53 | 169 | 45 | .266 | 4 | 31 |

=== Pitching ===
==== Starting pitchers ====
Note: G = Games pitched; IP = Innings pitched; W = Wins; L = Losses; ERA = Earned run average; SO = Strikeouts

| Player | G | IP | W | L | ERA | SO |
|---|---|---|---|---|---|---|
| Jesse Duryea | 53 | 401.0 | 32 | 19 | 2.56 | 183 |
| Lee Viau | 47 | 373.0 | 22 | 20 | 3.79 | 152 |
| Tony Mullane | 33 | 220.0 | 11 | 9 | 2.99 | 112 |
| Mike Smith | 29 | 203.0 | 9 | 12 | 4.88 | 104 |
| Charlie Petty | 5 | 44.0 | 2 | 3 | 5.52 | 10 |

==== Relief pitchers ====
Note: G = Games pitched; W = Wins; L = Losses; SV = Saves; ERA = Earned run average; SO = Strikeouts

| Player | G | W | L | SV | ERA | SO |
|---|---|---|---|---|---|---|
| Theodore Conover | 1 | 0 | 0 | 1 | 13.50 | 1 |
