= 1889 Philadelphia Athletics season =

1889 Philadelphia Athletics
- League: American Association
- Ballpark: Jefferson Street Grounds
- City: Philadelphia, Pennsylvania
- Record: 75–58 (.564)
- League place: 3rd
- Owners: Bill Sharsig, H. C. Pennypacker, William Whittaker
- Manager: Bill Sharsig

The 1889 Philadelphia Athletics finished with a 75–58 record and finished in third place in the American Association.

== Regular season ==
=== Season standings ===
American Association
Team	W	L	Pct.	GB	Home	Road
Brooklyn Bridegrooms	93	44	.679	—	50‍–‍19	43‍–‍25
St. Louis Browns	90	45	.667	2	51‍–‍18	39‍–‍27
Philadelphia Athletics	75	58	.564	16	46‍–‍22	29‍–‍36
Cincinnati Red Stockings	76	63	.547	18	47‍–‍26	29‍–‍37
Baltimore Orioles	70	65	.519	22	40‍–‍24	30‍–‍41
Columbus Solons	60	78	.435	33½	36‍–‍33	24‍–‍45
Kansas City Cowboys	55	82	.401	38	35‍–‍35	20‍–‍47
Louisville Colonels	27	111	.196	66½	18‍–‍46	9‍–‍65

=== Record vs. opponents ===
1889 American Association record Sources:
Team	BAL	BRO	CIN	COL	KC	LOU	PHA	STL
Baltimore	—	8–12	8–11–2	12–8	11–7	16–4	8–11	7–12–2
Brooklyn	12–8	—	15–5	11–8–2	16–4	19–1	12–7–1	8–11
Cincinnati	11–8–2	5–15	—	11–9	14–6	18–2	9–11	8–12
Columbus	8–12	8–11–2	9–11	—	9–11	13–7	7–12	6–14
Kansas City	7–11	4–16	6–14	11–9	—	13–6	8–12–1	6–14–1
Louisville	4–16	1–19	2–18	7–13	6–13	—	5–14–1	2–18–1
Philadelphia	11–8	7–12–1	11–9	12–7	12–8–1	14–5–1	—	8–9–2
St. Louis	12–7–2	11–8	12–8	14–6	14–6–1	18–2–1	9–8–2	—

=== Roster ===
1889 Philadelphia Athletics
Roster
Pitchers: George Bausewine; John Coleman; Ed Knouff; Sadie McMahon; Ed Seward; Phenomenal Smith; Gus Weyhing	Catchers: Jack Brennan; Bill Collins; Lave Cross; Tom Gunning; Wilbert Robinson; Infielders: Lou Bierbauer; Frank Fennelly; James Graham; Henry Larkin; Denny Lyons	Outfielders: Mike Mattimore; Blondie Purcell; Harry Stovey; Curt Welch	Manager: Bill Sharsig

== Player stats ==
=== Batting ===
==== Starters by position ====
Note: Pos = Position; G = Games played; AB = At bats; H = Hits; Avg. = Batting average; HR = Home runs; RBI = Runs batted in

Pos	Player	G	AB	H	Avg.	HR	RBI
C	Wilbert Robinson	69	264	61	.231	0	28
1B	Henry Larkin	133	516	164	.318	3	74
2B	Lou Bierbauer	130	549	167	.304	7	105
SS	Frank Fennelly	138	513	132	.257	1	64
3B	Denny Lyons	131	510	168	.329	9	82
OF	Harry Stovey	137	556	171	.308	19	119
OF	Curt Welch	125	516	140	.271	0	39
OF	Blondie Purcell	129	507	160	.316	0	85

==== Other batters ====
Note: G = Games played; AB = At bats; H = Hits; Avg. = Batting average; HR = Home runs; RBI = Runs batted in

Player	G	AB	H	Avg.	HR	RBI
Lave Cross	55	199	44	.221	0	23
Jack Brennan	31	113	25	.221	0	15
Mike Mattimore	23	73	17	.233	1	8
Tom Gunning	8	24	6	.250	1	1
James Graham	4	18	3	.167	0	0
Bill Collins	1	4	1	.250	0	1

=== Pitching ===
==== Starting pitchers ====
Note: G = Games pitched; IP = Innings pitched; W = Wins; L = Losses; ERA = Earned run average; SO = Strikeouts

Player	G	IP	W	L	ERA	SO
Gus Weyhing	54	449.0	30	21	2.95	213
Ed Seward	39	320.0	21	15	3.97	102
Sadie McMahon	28	242.0	14	12	3.53	117
George Bausewine	7	55.1	1	4	3.90	18
Phenomenal Smith	5	43.0	2	3	4.40	12
John Coleman	5	34.0	3	2	2.91	6
Ed Knouff	3	25.0	2	0	3.96	5

==== Other pitchers ====
Note: G = Games pitched; IP = Innings pitched; W = Wins; L = Losses; ERA = Earned run average; SO = Strikeouts

Player	G	IP	W	L	ERA	SO
Mike Mattimore	5	31.0	2	1	5.81	6
