= 1889 Columbus Solons season =

1889 Columbus Solons
- League: American Association
- Ballpark: Recreation Park
- City: Columbus, Ohio
- Record: 60–76 (.441)
- League place: 6th
- Manager: Al Buckenberger

The 1889 Columbus Solons baseball team finished with a 60–78 record, sixth place in the American Association during their debut season.

== Offseason ==
- January 11, 1889: Wild Bill Widner was purchased by the Solons from the Washington Nationals.

== Regular season ==
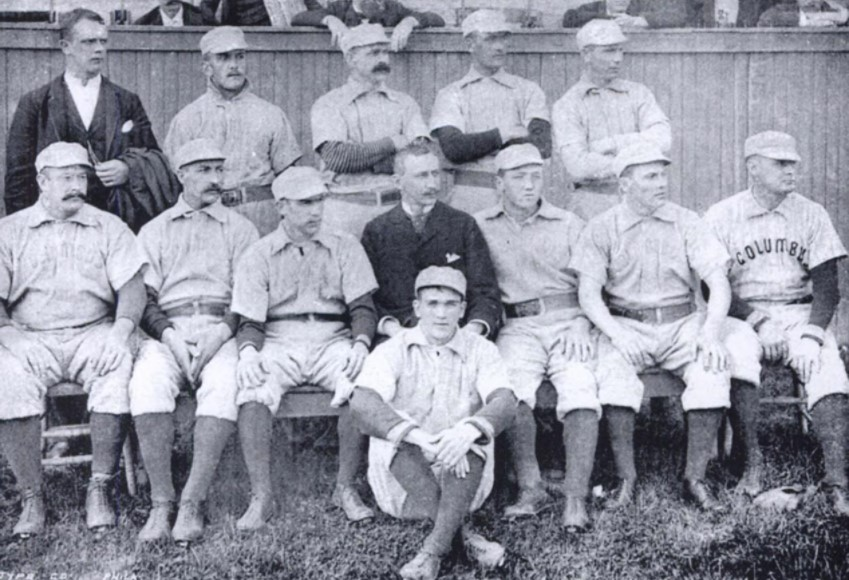
1889 Columbus Solons

=== Season standings ===
American Association
Team	W	L	Pct.	GB	Home	Road
Brooklyn Bridegrooms	93	44	.679	—	50‍–‍19	43‍–‍25
St. Louis Browns	90	45	.667	2	51‍–‍18	39‍–‍27
Philadelphia Athletics	75	58	.564	16	46‍–‍22	29‍–‍36
Cincinnati Red Stockings	76	63	.547	18	47‍–‍26	29‍–‍37
Baltimore Orioles	70	65	.519	22	40‍–‍24	30‍–‍41
Columbus Solons	60	78	.435	33½	36‍–‍33	24‍–‍45
Kansas City Cowboys	55	82	.401	38	35‍–‍35	20‍–‍47
Louisville Colonels	27	111	.196	66½	18‍–‍46	9‍–‍65

=== Record vs. opponents ===
1889 American Association record Sources:
Team	BAL	BRO	CIN	COL	KC	LOU	PHA	STL
Baltimore	—	8–12	8–11–2	12–8	11–7	16–4	8–11	7–12–2
Brooklyn	12–8	—	15–5	11–8–2	16–4	19–1	12–7–1	8–11
Cincinnati	11–8–2	5–15	—	11–9	14–6	18–2	9–11	8–12
Columbus	8–12	8–11–2	9–11	—	9–11	13–7	7–12	6–14
Kansas City	7–11	4–16	6–14	11–9	—	13–6	8–12–1	6–14–1
Louisville	4–16	1–19	2–18	7–13	6–13	—	5–14–1	2–18–1
Philadelphia	11–8	7–12–1	11–9	12–7	12–8–1	14–5–1	—	8–9–2
St. Louis	12–7–2	11–8	12–8	14–6	14–6–1	18–2–1	9–8–2	—

=== Roster ===
1889 Columbus Solons
Roster
Pitchers: Mark Baldwin; Jack Easton; Hank Gastright; Al Mays; John Weyhing; Wild Bill Widner	Catchers: Ned Bligh; Jack Doyle; Rudy Kemmler; Sparrow McCaffrey; Jack O'Connor; Jimmy Peoples; Infielders: Jack Crooks; Henry Easterday; Bill Greenwood; Heinie Kappel; Lefty Marr; Dave Orr; Charlie Reilly	Outfielders: Ed Daily; Bill George; Spud Johnson; Jim McTamany	Manager: Al Buckenberger

== Player stats ==
=== Batting ===
==== Starters by position ====
Note: Pos = Position; G = Games played; AB = At bats; H = Hits; Avg. = Batting average; HR = Home runs; RBI = Runs batted in

Pos	Player	G	AB	H	Avg.	HR	RBI
C	Jack O'Connor	107	398	107	.269	4	60
1B	Dave Orr	134	560	183	.327	4	87
2B	Bill Greenwood	118	414	93	.225	3	49
SS	Henry Easterday	95	324	56	.173	4	34
3B	Lefty Marr	139	546	167	.306	1	75
OF	Spud Johnson	116	459	130	.283	2	79
OF	Jim McTamany	139	529	146	.276	4	52
OF	Ed Daily	136	578	148	.256	3	70

==== Other batters ====
Note: G = Games played; AB = At bats; H = Hits; Avg. = Batting average; HR = Home runs; RBI = Runs batted in

Player	G	AB	H	Avg.	HR	RBI
Heinie Kappel	46	173	47	.272	3	21
Jimmy Peoples	29	100	23	.230	1	16
Ned Bligh	28	93	13	.140	0	5
Jack Crooks	12	43	14	.326	0	7
Jack Doyle	11	36	10	.278	0	3
Rudy Kemmler	8	26	3	.115	0	0
Charlie Reilly	6	23	11	.478	3	6
Bill George	5	17	4	.235	0	3
Sparrow McCaffrey	2	1	1	1.000	0	0

=== Pitching ===
==== Starting pitchers ====
Note: G = Games pitched; IP = Innings pitched; W = Wins; L = Losses; ERA = Earned run average; SO = Strikeouts

Player	G	IP	W	L	ERA	SO
Mark Baldwin	63	513.2	27	34	3.61	368
Wild Bill Widner	41	294.0	12	20	5.20	63
Hank Gastright	32	222.2	10	16	4.57	115
Al Mays	21	140.0	10	7	4.82	52

==== Other pitchers ====
Note: G = Games pitched; IP = Innings pitched; W = Wins; L = Losses; ERA = Earned run average; SO = Strikeouts

Player	G	IP	W	L	ERA	SO
Jack Easton	4	18.0	1	0	3.50	7

==== Relief pitchers ====
Note: G = Games pitched; IP = Innings pitched; W = Wins; L = Losses; ERA = Earned run average; SO = Strikeouts

Player	G	W	L	SV	ERA	SO
Bill George	2	0	0	0	7.88	3
Ed Daily	2	0	0	1	21.60	2
John Weyhing	1	0	0	0	27.00	0
