= 1889 St. Louis Browns season =

Major League Baseball season

1889 St. Louis Browns
- League: American Association
- Ballpark: Sportsman's Park
- City: St. Louis, Missouri
- Record: 90–45 (.667)
- League place: 2nd
- Owner: Chris von der Ahe
- Manager: Charlie Comiskey
- Stats: ESPN.com; Baseball Reference

The 1889 St. Louis Browns season was the team's eighth season in St. Louis, Missouri, and its eighth season in the American Association. The Browns went 90–45 during the season and finished second in the American Association.

== Regular season ==
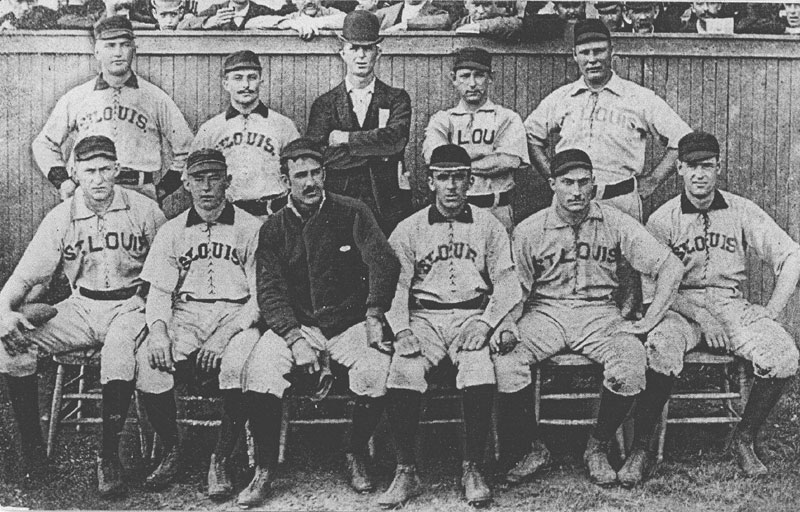
The 1889 St. Louis Browns

=== Season standings ===
American Association
Team	W	L	Pct.	GB	Home	Road
Brooklyn Bridegrooms	93	44	.679	—	50‍–‍19	43‍–‍25
St. Louis Browns	90	45	.667	2	51‍–‍18	39‍–‍27
Philadelphia Athletics	75	58	.564	16	46‍–‍22	29‍–‍36
Cincinnati Red Stockings	76	63	.547	18	47‍–‍26	29‍–‍37
Baltimore Orioles	70	65	.519	22	40‍–‍24	30‍–‍41
Columbus Solons	60	78	.435	33½	36‍–‍33	24‍–‍45
Kansas City Cowboys	55	82	.401	38	35‍–‍35	20‍–‍47
Louisville Colonels	27	111	.196	66½	18‍–‍46	9‍–‍65

=== Record vs. opponents ===
1889 American Association record Sources:
Team	BAL	BRO	CIN	COL	KC	LOU	PHA	STL
Baltimore	—	8–12	8–11–2	12–8	11–7	16–4	8–11	7–12–2
Brooklyn	12–8	—	15–5	11–8–2	16–4	19–1	12–7–1	8–11
Cincinnati	11–8–2	5–15	—	11–9	14–6	18–2	9–11	8–12
Columbus	8–12	8–11–2	9–11	—	9–11	13–7	7–12	6–14
Kansas City	7–11	4–16	6–14	11–9	—	13–6	8–12–1	6–14–1
Louisville	4–16	1–19	2–18	7–13	6–13	—	5–14–1	2–18–1
Philadelphia	11–8	7–12–1	11–9	12–7	12–8–1	14–5–1	—	8–9–2
St. Louis	12–7–2	11–8	12–8	14–6	14–6–1	18–2–1	9–8–2	—

=== Roster ===
1889 St. Louis Browns
Roster
Pitchers: Ice Box Chamberlain; Jim Devlin; Nat Hudson; Silver King; Toad Ramsey; Jack Stivetts	Catchers: Jack Bellman; Jack Boyle; Dad Meek; Jocko Milligan; Infielders: Charlie Comiskey; Jumbo Davis; Shorty Fuller; Arlie Latham; Yank Robinson; Pete Sweeney	Outfielders: Charlie Duffee; Tom Gettinger; Jim Gill; Tommy McCarthy; Tip O'Neill	Manager: Charles Comiskey

== Player stats ==
=== Batting ===
==== Starters by position ====
Note: Pos = Position; G = Games played; AB = At bats; H = Hits; Avg. = Batting average; HR = Home runs; RBI = Runs batted in

Pos	Player	G	AB	H	Avg.	HR	RBI
C	Jack Boyle	99	347	85	.245	3	42
1B	Charlie Comiskey	137	587	168	.286	3	102
2B	Yank Robinson	132	452	94	.208	5	70
SS	Shorty Fuller	140	517	117	.226	0	51
3B	Arlie Latham	118	512	126	.246	4	49
OF	Tip O'Neill	134	534	179	.335	9	110
OF	Charlie Duffee	137	509	124	.244	16	86
OF	Tommy McCarthy	140	604	176	.291	2	63

==== Other batters ====
Note: G = Games played; AB = At bats; H = Hits; Avg. = Batting average; HR = Home runs; RBI = Runs batted in

Player	G	AB	H	Avg.	HR	RBI
Jocko Milligan	72	273	100	.366	12	76
Nat Hudson	13	52	13	.250	1	10

=== Pitching ===
==== Starting pitchers ====
Note: G = Games pitched; IP = Innings pitched; W = Wins; L = Losses; ERA = Earned run average; SO = Strikeouts

Player	G	IP	W	L	ERA	SO
Silver King	56	458.0	35	16	3.14	188
Ice Box Chamberlain	53	421.2	32	15	2.97	202
Jack Stivetts	26	191.2	12	7	2.25	143
Jim Devlin	9	60.0	5	3	2.40	37

==== Other pitchers ====
Note: G = Games pitched; IP = Innings pitched; W = Wins; L = Losses; ERA = Earned run average; SO = Strikeouts

Player	G	IP	W	L	ERA	SO
Nat Hudson	9	60.0	3	2	4.20	13
Toad Ramsey	5	41.0	3	1	3.95	33

==== Relief pitchers ====
Note: G = Games pitched; W = Wins; L = Losses; SV = Saves; ERA = Earned run average; SO = Strikeouts

Player	G	W	L	SV	ERA	SO
Tommy McCarthy	1	0	0	0	7.20	1
Charlie Comiskey	1	0	0	0	0.00	0
