= Jim Donahue =

American baseball player (1862–1935)

- Catcher
- Born: January 8, 1862; Lockport, Illinois, U.S.
- Died: April 19, 1935 (aged 73); Lockport, Illinois, U.S.
- Batted: Right Threw: Right

MLB debut
- April 19, 1886, for the New York Metropolitans

Last MLB appearance
- October 2, 1891, for the Columbus Solons

MLB statistics
- Batting average: .234
- Home runs: 2
- Runs batted in: 133
- Stats at Baseball Reference

Teams
- New York Metropolitans (1886–1887); Kansas City Cowboys (1888–1889); Columbus Solons (1891)

James Augustus Donahue (January 8, 1862 – April 19, 1935) was an American Major League Baseball player from Lockport, Illinois, who played his entire career in the American Association from 1886 through 1891.

== Career ==
Donahue made his Major League debut with the New York Metropolitans of the American Association in 1886, splitting time between the outfield and catcher, where he platooned with Charlie Reipschlager. He played in 49 games, and had a batting average of .199. He returned the following season, again platooning at catcher, this time with Bill Holbert, and had a .282 batting average, which proved to be his best season at the plate. Following the season Donahue was sold to the Brooklyn Bridegrooms along with several other player on October 20, 1887, who then turned around and sold him on January 15, 1888 to the Kansas City Cowboys along with several others.

With Kansas City in 1888, he had his most playing time, as he was considered the starting catcher. He played in 88 games, hit .234, and had a career high 11 doubles. That season, he was also used as a substitute umpire on two occasions, but for the game on July 14, it became dubiously notable. Bridegroom pitcher Adonis Terry claimed that he overheard Cowboy manager Sam Barkley order Donahue to call a Bridegroom runner out in the 9th inning of a 5-4 game. The Grooms walked off the field in protest‚ forfeiting the game‚ resulting in a 9-0 score. In 1889, he returned to platooning, as the Cowboys promoted Charlie Hoover to starter. Donahue caught 46 games that season and split the remainder of his games between the left field and third base, while hitting .234, and 32 runs batted in.

After the 1889 season, the Cowboys folded and Donahue did not play in the majors for the 1890 season, but returned for the 1891 Columbus Solons, and played in 77 games, hit .218, and drove in 35 runs. This was his final major league season.

== Post-career ==
After leaving baseball, Donahue returned to his hometown of Lockport, and it was there that he died at the age of 73 with his valet CJ Winkler at his side. He was interred at the South Lockport Cemetery.
