= 1889 Brooklyn Bridegrooms season =

1889 Brooklyn Bridegrooms
- American Association Champions
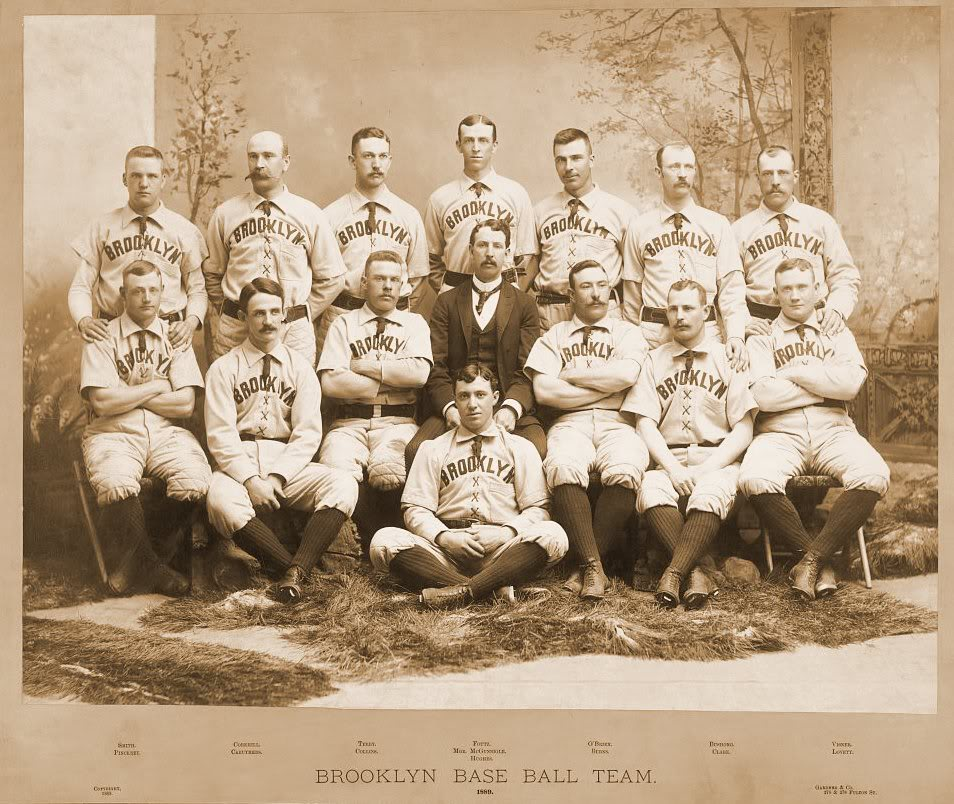
- League: American Association
- Ballpark: Washington Park
- City: Brooklyn, New York
- Record: 93–44 (.679)
- League place: 1st
- Owners: Charles Byrne, Ferdinand Abell
- President: Charles Byrne
- Manager: Bill McGunnigle

The 1889 Brooklyn Bridegrooms won the American Association championship by two games over the St. Louis Browns.

== Offseason ==
- December 23, 1888: Al Mays and Dave Orr were purchased from the Bridegrooms by the Columbus Solons.
- Prior to 1889 season: Paul Radford was purchased from the Bridegrooms by the Cleveland Spiders.

== Regular season ==
=== Season standings ===
American Association
Team	W	L	Pct.	GB	Home	Road
Brooklyn Bridegrooms	93	44	.679	—	50‍–‍19	43‍–‍25
St. Louis Browns	90	45	.667	2	51‍–‍18	39‍–‍27
Philadelphia Athletics	75	58	.564	16	46‍–‍22	29‍–‍36
Cincinnati Red Stockings	76	63	.547	18	47‍–‍26	29‍–‍37
Baltimore Orioles	70	65	.519	22	40‍–‍24	30‍–‍41
Columbus Solons	60	78	.435	33½	36‍–‍33	24‍–‍45
Kansas City Cowboys	55	82	.401	38	35‍–‍35	20‍–‍47
Louisville Colonels	27	111	.196	66½	18‍–‍46	9‍–‍65

=== Record vs. opponents ===
1889 American Association record Sources:
Team	BAL	BRO	CIN	COL	KC	LOU	PHA	STL
Baltimore	—	8–12	8–11–2	12–8	11–7	16–4	8–11	7–12–2
Brooklyn	12–8	—	15–5	11–8–2	16–4	19–1	12–7–1	8–11
Cincinnati	11–8–2	5–15	—	11–9	14–6	18–2	9–11	8–12
Columbus	8–12	8–11–2	9–11	—	9–11	13–7	7–12	6–14
Kansas City	7–11	4–16	6–14	11–9	—	13–6	8–12–1	6–14–1
Louisville	4–16	1–19	2–18	7–13	6–13	—	5–14–1	2–18–1
Philadelphia	11–8	7–12–1	11–9	12–7	12–8–1	14–5–1	—	8–9–2
St. Louis	12–7–2	11–8	12–8	14–6	14–6–1	18–2–1	9–8–2	—

=== Roster ===
1889 Brooklyn Bridegrooms
Roster
Pitchers: Bob Caruthers; Mickey Hughes; Tom Lovett; Adonis Terry	Catchers: Doc Bushong; Bob Clark; Charlie Reynolds; Joe Visner; Infielders: Hub Collins; Dave Foutz; George Pinkney; Germany Smith	Outfielders: Oyster Burns; Pop Corkhill; Darby O'Brien	Manager: Bill McGunnigle

== Player stats ==
=== Batting ===
==== Starters by position ====
Note: Pos = Position; G = Games played; AB = At bats; R = Runs; H = Hits; Avg. = Batting average; HR = Home runs; RBI = Runs batted in; SB = Stolen bases

Pos	Player	G	AB	R	H	Avg.	HR	RBI	SB
C	Bob Clark	53	182	32	50	.275	0	22	18
1B	Dave Foutz	138	553	118	152	.275	6	113	43
2B	Hub Collins	138	560	139	149	.266	2	73	65
3B	Germany Smith	121	446	89	103	.231	3	53	35
SS	George Pinkney	138	545	103	134	.246	4	82	47
OF	Pop Corkhill	138	537	91	134	.250	8	78	22
OF	Darby O'Brien	136	567	146	170	.300	5	80	91
OF	Oyster Burns	131	504	105	153	.304	5	100	32

==== Other batters ====
Note: G = Games played; AB = At bats; R = Runs; H = Hits; Avg. = Batting average; HR = Home runs; RBI = Runs batted in; SB = Stolen bases

Player	G	AB	R	H	Avg.	HR	RBI	SB
Joe Visner	80	295	56	76	.258	8	68	13
Doc Bushong	25	84	15	13	.155	0	8	2
Charlie Reynolds	12	42	5	9	.214	0	3	2

=== Pitching ===
==== Starting pitchers ====
Note: G = Games pitched; IP = Innings pitched; W = Wins; L = Losses; ERA = Earned run average; BB = Bases on balls; SO = Strikeouts; CG = Complete games

Player	G	GS	IP	W	L	ERA	BB	SO	CG
Bob Caruthers	56	50	445.0	40	11	3.13	104	118	46
Adonis Terry	41	39	326.0	22	15	3.29	126	186	35
Tom Lovett	29	28	229.0	17	10	4.32	65	92	23
Mickey Hughes	20	17	153.0	9	8	4.35	86	54	13

==== Other pitchers ====
Note: G = Games pitched; IP = Innings pitched; W = Wins; L = Losses; ERA = Earned run average; SO = Strikeouts

Player	G	IP	W	L	ERA	SO
Dave Foutz	12	59.2	3	0	4.37	21

== 1889 World Series ==
The Bridegrooms played in the 1889 World Series representing the American Association against the New York Giants, champions of the National League. The Giants won the series, 6 games to 3. This series would be the first meeting between these two historic rivals.
