= Barney Graham =

Barney Graham may refer to:

- James Graham (baseball), Major League Baseball player
- Barney S. Graham, American immunologist, virologist and clinical trials physician
