= Frank Bell (baseball) =

American baseball player (1863–1891)

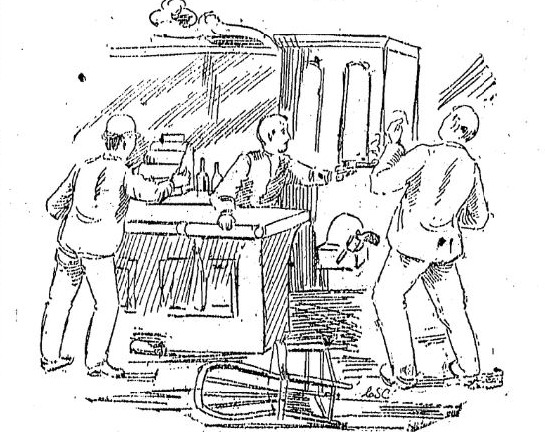
- The only known depiction of Bell is this drawing of him being shot by the bartender, from the April 14, 1891 edition of the Cincinnati Post
- Catcher/Outfielder
- Born: December 11, 1862; Cincinnati, Ohio, U.S.
- Died: April 14, 1891 (aged 28); Cincinnati, Ohio, U.S.
- Batted: Unknown Threw: Unknown

MLB debut
- July 7, 1885, for the Brooklyn Grays

Last MLB appearance
- July 31, 1885, for the Brooklyn Grays

MLB statistics
- Batting average: .172
- Home runs: 0
- Runs batted in: 2
- Stats at Baseball Reference

Teams
- Brooklyn Grays (1885)

Frank Gustav Bell (December 11, 1862 – April 14, 1891) was an American Major League Baseball player from Cincinnati who played one season in the Majors, for the 1885 Brooklyn Grays of the American Association. In July 1885 Bell appeared in a total of ten games as a catcher, outfielder, and third baseman for the Grays. He batted .172 (5-for-29) with two runs batted in and five runs scored. He also was an umpire for three American Association games in 1889, all in Cincinnati.

He was a brother of former major league pitcher Charlie Bell. After his baseball career, Bell became a private police officer. On April 14, 1891, he was shot and killed by bartender Joe Hughes in a saloon after attempting to attack him following his loss at a card game called Freeze-Out. The shooting was deemed to have been self-defense. He is interred at Wesleyan Cemetery.
