= Association Park =

Former baseball grounds in Kansas City, Missouri

Association Park is the name of two different baseball grounds which were located in Kansas City, Missouri, United States.

== Association Park (I) ==
Association Park
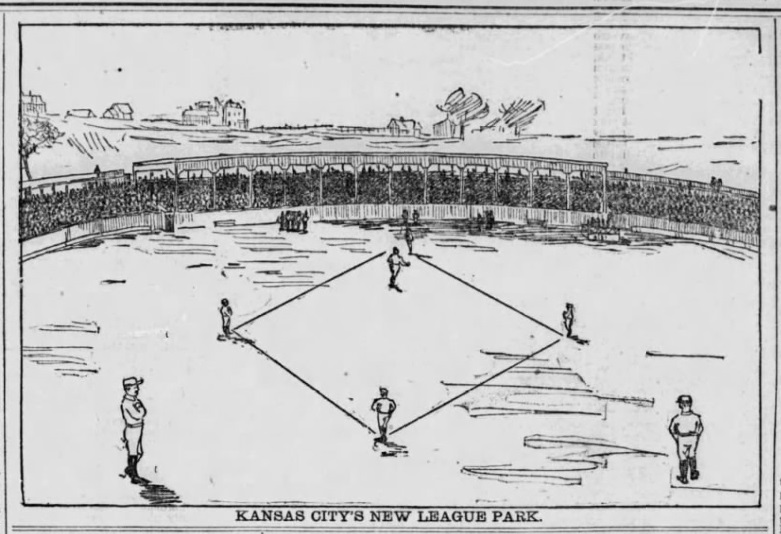
- 1886 ballpark
- Interactive map of Association Park
- Location: Kansas City, Missouri
- Coordinates: 39°6′22″N 94°33′57″W
- Surface: grass

Construction
- Closed: 1888

Tenants
- Kansas City Cowboys (NL) (1886); Kansas City Cowboys (WL) (1887); Kansas City Cowboys (AA) (1888)

This ballpark was home to the Kansas City Cowboys of the National League for the 1886 season. It was initially known as League Park. It was built in a low area that was once a pond. It became a heat sink during the peak of summer, and became derisively dubbed "The Hole."

It was later the home field for Kansas City entry in the Western League (1887) and then the Kansas City entry in the AA (1888).

As described in contemporary newspapers, it was on a block bounded by Lydia Avenue (east, first base); Sixth Street (now Admiral Boulevard; south, third base); John Street and Tracy Avenue (west, left field); and Independence Avenue (north, right field) [Kansas City Times, May 1, 1886, p.5]

When the park opened, local newspapers were effusive in their praise, saying, "The grounds are not surpassed by those in any city in the league." [Kansas City Times, May 1, 1886, p.5]

By 1888, between the frequently poor showing of the various teams, along with the tendency of the low-lying field to accumulate smelly, swampy water, local papers had considerably changed their tune, calling it, "One of the worst base ball parks in the country." [Kansas City Times, January 21, 1888, p.4]

The field was abandoned to developers after 1888.

The ballpark site is now the home of the Al-Taqwa Islamic Center.

== Association Park (II) ==
Association Park
- 1909 ballpark
- Interactive map of Association Park
- Location: Kansas City, Missouri
- Coordinates: 39°5′19″N 94°33′11″W
- Surface: grass

Construction
- Demolished: 1925

Tenants
- Kansas City Blues (AA) (1903–1923); Kansas City Monarchs (NNL I) (1920–1923)

This ballpark was home to the Kansas City Blues American Association entry during 1903 through the early weeks of the 1923 season. It was also home to the Kansas City Monarchs during 1920-early 1923. The Blues moved here after having played their games at Exposition Park in 1902.

It was on a block bounded by Prospect Avenue (east, left field); East 20th Street (south, right field); Olive Street (west, first base); and railroad tracks (north, third base). An early report indicated dimensions for left field as 330 feet (100 m) and for right field as 290 feet (88 m). If center field were a square corner, it would have been about 440 feet (130 m) from home plate.[Kansas City Journal, March 19, 1903, p.7]

As construction proceeded, a contest was held to allow the public to name the ballpark. Strong vote-getters included "Bluefield" (for the club's nickname) and "Gear Park" (for popular local player and club president Dale Gear), but the winner was the more prosaic "Association Park".[Kansas City Journal, April 5, 1903, p.8]

During some years when the annual Missouri–Kansas football game was played in Kansas City, Association Park hosted the game in 1905, 1906, 1908 and 1909.

Both the Blues and the Monarchs moved to the new and nearby Muehlebach Field in July 1923.

The ballpark hosted various local activities during the next couple of years, and then was demolished in June and July of 1925.[Kansas City Journal, July 7, 1925, p.2] The lot was eventually converted into a public playground, called Blues Park.

=== Gallery ===
1909 football seating chart

1925 ballpark being demolished
