= Steve Ladew =

American baseball player (1863–1895)

- Outfielder/Pitcher
- Born: 1863; St. Louis, Missouri, U.S.
- Died: January 10, 1895 (aged 31–32); Trenton, Missouri, U.S.
- Batted: Unknown Threw: Unknown

MLB debut
- September 27, 1889, for the Kansas City Cowboys

Last MLB appearance
- September 28, 1889, for the Kansas City Cowboys

MLB statistics
- Batting average: .000
- Runs batted in: 0
- Earned run average: 4.50
- Stats at Baseball Reference

Teams
- Kansas City Cowboys (1889)

Stephen F. Ladew (1863 – January 10, 1895) was an American Major League Baseball player. He played pitcher and outfielder for the Kansas City Cowboys of the American Association in two games on September 27 and 28, 1889. During the 1890 and 1891 seasons he played minor league baseball in the Illinois–Iowa League.

He married the British-born Mary Nevin in Ottumwa, Iowa around 1891 and in 1892 a daughter named Ophelia was born. However, he died shortly thereafter, as Mary is listed as living with Ophelia and one John Moffitt in the 1900 census. Recent research has unearthed a death certificate for Stephen Ladue dated January 10, 1895. The cause of death is listed as typhoid fever and various articles in the Trenton Evening Republican of Missouri confirm that this is the same person as Steve Ladew. The newspaper adds that Ladew was a fireman for the Rock Island railway who was remembered as a quiet and unassuming gentleman and as a pitcher for the local ball club. He was buried in Mount Olive Cemetery in Lemay, Missouri, near St. Louis.

== Sources ==
- Career statistics from Baseball Reference · Baseball Reference (Minors) · Retrosheet · Baseball Almanac
- "Stephen Ladew", in Bill Carle, ed.: Biographical Research Committee Report, SABR, March/April 2009, pp. 1–2.
