= Will Holland (baseball, born 1862) =

American baseball player (1862–1930)

- Shortstop
- Born: 1862; Georgetown, Delaware, U.S.
- Died: July 19, 1930; Philadelphia, Pennsylvania, U.S.
- Batted: Unknown Threw: Unknown

MLB debut
- July 10, 1889, for the Baltimore Orioles

Last MLB appearance
- October 12, 1889, for the Baltimore Orioles

MLB statistics
- Batting average: .189
- Home runs: 0
- Runs scored: 16
- Stats at Baseball Reference

Teams
- Baltimore Orioles (1889)

Willard A. Holland (1862 – July 19, 1930) was an American professional baseball player for the 1889 Baltimore Orioles of the American Association. He played in the minor leagues through 1898. His son was 1949 Indianapolis 500 winner Bill Holland.
