= Sparrow McCaffrey =

American baseball player (1868–1894)

- Catcher
- Born: 1868; Philadelphia, Pennsylvania, U.S.
- Died: April 29, 1894 (aged 25–26); Philadelphia, Pennsylvania, U.S.
- Batted: Unknown Threw: Unknown

MLB debut
- August 13, 1889, for the Columbus Solons

Last MLB appearance
- August 15, 1889, for the Columbus Solons

MLB statistics
- Batting average: 1.000
- Home runs: 0
- Runs batted in: 0
- Stats at Baseball Reference

Teams
- Columbus Solons (1889)

Charles P. "Sparrow" McCaffrey (1868 – April 29, 1894) was an American baseball player.

== Career ==
Charles McCaffrey, born in Philadelphia, got his nickname "Sparrow" honestly: listed at 120 pounds, he was one of the lightest Major League Baseball players ever. (Eddie Gaedel was just 65 pounds; Hall of Fame pitcher Candy Cummings also weighed in at 120.)

McCaffrey, a catcher, began his baseball career with the local Norristown, Pennsylvania team of the Middle States League in 1889; just twenty-one years old, the Columbus Solons of the American Association took a flyer on him that same year.

On August 13, 1889, in St. Louis, he made his debut for the Solons, replacing catcher Jack O'Connor late in the contest, notching a single and scoring a run. Two days later, again against the Browns, McCaffrey was sent in as a pinch hitter, drawing a walk; this makes him one of only thirty players in MLB history owning a perfect 1.000 on-base average with at least two plate appearances.

McCaffrey returned to the minors in 1890, playing the next three seasons in Lebanon, Pennsylvania, Troy, New York and with his hometown Philadelphia Athletics of the Eastern League (unrelated to either the early team with that name or the later American League franchise).

== Death ==
McCaffrey died of consumption at the age of twenty-six, in Philadelphia on April 29, 1894.

== Sources ==
- Career statistics from Baseball Reference · Baseball Reference (Minors) · Retrosheet · Baseball Almanac
