= Dave Rowe (baseball) =

American baseball player and manager (1854–1930)

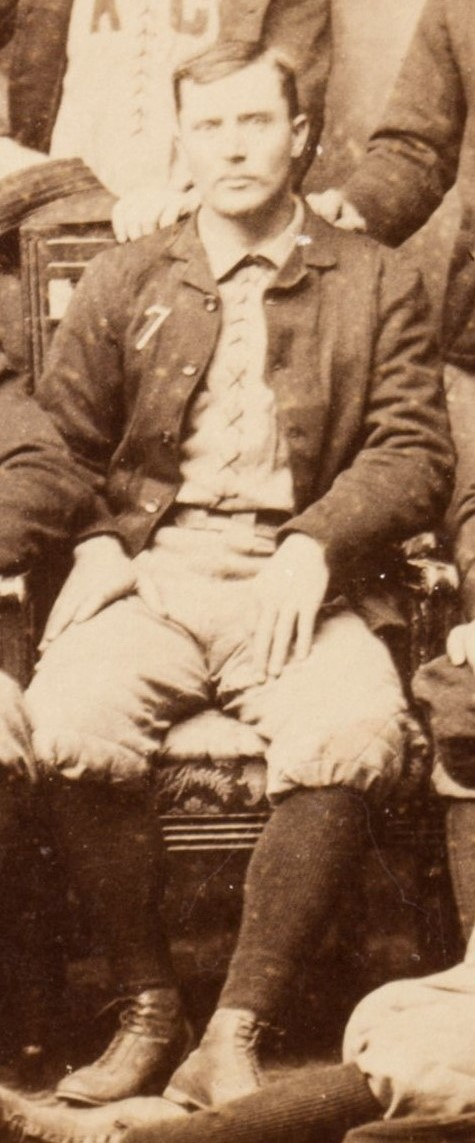
- Rowe in 1888
- Outfielder / Manager
- Born: October 9, 1854; Cold Spring Township, Lebanon County, Pennsylvania, U.S.
- Died: December 9, 1930 (aged 76); Glendale, California, U.S.
- Batted: Right Threw: Right

MLB debut
- May 30, 1877, for the Chicago White Stockings

Last MLB appearance
- June 17, 1888, for the Kansas City Cowboys

MLB statistics
- Batting average: .263
- Home runs: 8
- Runs scored: 223
- Stats at Baseball Reference

Teams
- As player: Chicago White Stockings (1877); Cleveland Blues (1882); Baltimore Orioles (1883); St. Louis Maroons (1884–1885); Kansas City Cowboys (NL) (1885); Kansas City Cowboys (AA) (1888); As manager: Kansas City Cowboys (NL) (1885); Kansas City Cowboys (AA) (1888)

David Elwood Rowe (October 9, 1854 – December 9, 1930) was an American outfielder and manager in Major League Baseball (MLB).

== Baseball career ==
Rowe was born in Cold Spring Township, Lebanon County, Pennsylvania, in 1854. He had a younger brother, Jack Rowe, who also played and managed in the major leagues.

Dave Rowe started his professional baseball career playing two games for the Chicago White Stockings of the National League (NL) in 1877. In 1882, he made it back to the majors with the NL's Cleveland Blues, playing 24 games for them. In 1883, he played 59 games for the Baltimore Orioles of the American Association (AA).

In 1884, Rowe played for the St. Louis Maroons, which won the Union Association (UA) championship in that league's only year of existence. In 109 games, he had a batting average of .293 and led the UA in at bats with 485. Rowe stayed with the Maroons when they joined the NL in 1885, playing 16 games for them that season.

In 1886, Rowe was a player-manager for the NL's Kansas City Cowboys, appearing in 105 games for them. In 1887, he was a player-manager for the Lincoln Tree Planters of the Western League (WL). In 1888, Rowe played 32 games for the AA's Kansas City Cowboys. That was his last appearance in the major leagues.

Rowe was a player-manager for Denver of the Western Association (WA) in 1889 and 1890. In 1891, he was a player-manager for the WA's Lincoln Rustlers. He finished his professional baseball playing career in 1892 as a player-manager of the WL's Omaha Omahogs.

During his MLB career, Rowe played 347 games and had a .263 batting average, 8 home runs, 223 runs scored, and 90 runs batted in. He also played four games as a pitcher and had a 1–2 win–loss record with a 9.78 earned run average and 3 strikeouts.

In a game on July 24, 1882, Rowe pitched nine innings and allowed 35 runs to score, 12 of them earned, in a loss. This remains the single-game record for most runs scored against a pitcher in MLB history.

Rowe died in Glendale, California, in 1930. He is buried in Forest Lawn Memorial Park in Glendale.

== See also ==
- List of Major League Baseball player-managers
