= Jim Gill =

American baseball player (1865–1923)

- Outfielder / Second baseman
- Born: October 8, 1865; Richmond, Virginia, U.S.
- Died: April 10, 1923 (aged 57); Beaver Falls, Pennsylvania, U.S.
- Batted: Unknown Threw: Unknown

MLB debut
- June 27, 1889, for the St. Louis Browns

Last MLB appearance
- July 1, 1889, for the St. Louis Browns

MLB statistics
- At bats: 8
- RBI: 1
- Home runs: 0
- Batting average: .250
- Stats at Baseball Reference

Teams
- St. Louis Browns (1889)

James Clifford Gill (October 8, 1865 – April 10, 1923) was an American professional baseball player who played for the St. Louis Browns of the American Association. He appeared in two games on June 27 & July 1, 1889. He had two hits in eight at-bats in that game.
