= Parke Swartzel =

American baseball player (1865–1940)

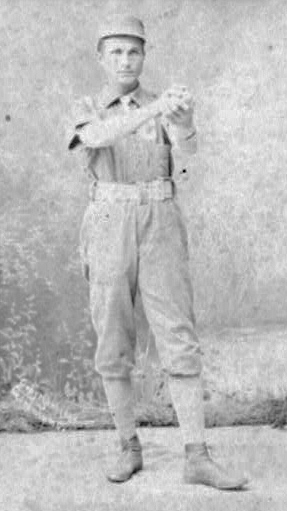
- Pitcher
- Born: November 21, 1865; Knightstown, Indiana, U.S.
- Died: January 3, 1940 (aged 74); Los Angeles, California, U.S.
- Batted: Right Threw: Right

MLB debut
- April 17, 1889, for the Kansas City Cowboys

Last MLB appearance
- October 14, 1889, for the Kansas City Cowboys

MLB statistics
- Win–loss record: 19–27
- Earned run average: 4.32
- Strikeouts: 147
- Stats at Baseball Reference

Teams
- Kansas City Cowboys (1889)

Parke B. Swartzel (November 21, 1865 – January 3, 1940) was an American professional baseball pitcher who played one season in Major League Baseball for the American Association's Kansas City Cowboys in 1889. In addition to his one major league season, he played six seasons of professional baseball at the minor league level.

== Career ==
Born on November 21, 1865, as Parke B. Swartzel in Knightstown, Indiana, US, he began his first of professional baseball season in 1886, at the age of 20, with the Leavenworth Soldiers of the Western League. He began the 1887 season with the Soldiers, however he is also credited with playing for the Lincoln Tree Planters, another Western League team. For the 1888 season, Swartzel played for the Kansas City Blues of the Western Association, a class-A level league.

His only season in Major League Baseball came in 1889 with the Kansas City Cowboys of the American Association. He made his major league debut on April 17, a 7–4 victory over the Louisville Colonels in the team's season opener. The Cowboys finished the season with a win–loss record of 55–82 with two ties with Swartzel making 48 appearances as a pitcher, starting 47 and completing 45. Swartzel had a win–loss record of 19–27, 147 strikeouts and a 4.32 ERA, in 410 1/3 innings pitched, and allowed a league-leading 481 hits, and 21 home runs, along with 334 runs, 197 earned runs and 117 bases on balls. He made his final major league appearance on October 14, a 7–5 victory over the Colonels.

Swartzel returned the Blues for the 1890 and 1891 seasons, then split the 1892 season with the Rochester Flour Cities of the Eastern League and the Minneapolis Minnies of the Western league. This was his last season, on record, of his professional baseball career, although he was noted to have been released by the Grand Rapids Rustlers of the Western League in May 1896. He died on January 3, 1940, in Los Angeles, California, US, and is interred at Forest Lawn Cemetery in Glendale, California.
