= John Bates (baseball) =

American baseball player (1868–1919)

- Pitcher
- Born: May 28, 1868; Ohio
- Died: March 24, 1919 (aged 50); Oakland, California
- Batted: Unknown Threw: Unknown

MLB debut
- August 25, 1889, for the Kansas City Cowboys

Last MLB appearance
- August 25, 1889, for the Kansas City Cowboys

MLB statistics
- Win–loss record: 0–1
- Earned run average: 13.50
- Strikeouts: 3
- Stats at Baseball Reference

Teams
- Kansas City Cowboys (1889)

John William Bates (May 28, 1868 – March 24, 1919) was a Major League Baseball pitcher. He played in one game, on August 25, 1889, for the Kansas City Cowboys of the American Association. He started the game and pitched an eight inning complete game, allowing 12 earned runs and recording the loss. After his brief time with the Cowboys, he played for another two years with the Austin Senators in the Texas League.

== Sources ==
- Career statistics from Baseball Reference, or Baseball Reference (Minors)
