= John McCarty (baseball) =

American baseball player (1867–1942)

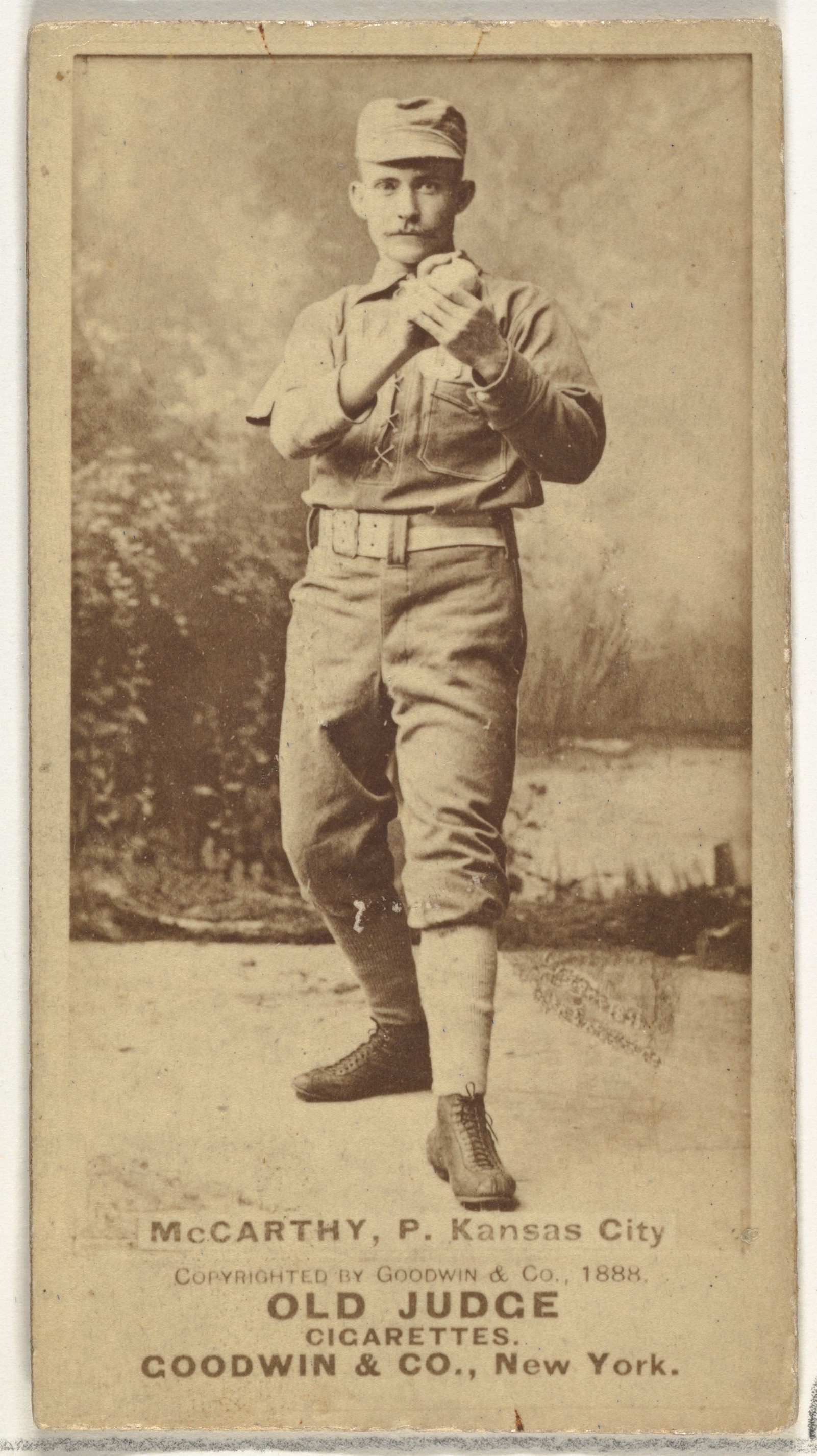
- Pitcher / Outfielder
- Born: February 9, 1867; Independence, Missouri, U.S.
- Died: August 20, 1942 (aged 75); Tulsa, Oklahoma, U.S.
- Batted: Unknown Threw: Right

MLB debut
- April 18, 1889, for the Kansas City Cowboys

Last MLB appearance
- July 7, 1889, for the Kansas City Cowboys

MLB statistics
- Win–loss record: 8–6
- Earned run average: 3.91
- Strikeouts: 36
- Stats at Baseball Reference

Teams
- Kansas City Cowboys (1889)

John Andrew McCarty (February 9, 1867 – August 20, 1942) was an American Major League Baseball pitcher. He played for the Kansas City Cowboys of the American Association during the 1889 season. He also played minor league ball between 1887 and 1891.

== Sources ==
- Career statistics from Baseball Reference · Baseball Reference (Minors) · Retrosheet · Baseball Almanac
