= Kansas City Cowboys (National League) =

Professional baseball team, National League 1886

Information
- League: National League
- Location: Kansas City, Missouri
- Ballpark: League Park
- Founded: 1886
- Folded: 1886
- Colors: Brown, white
- Manager: Dave Rowe

The Kansas City Cowboys were a National League baseball team that played one season in 1886. They played at League Park and finished with a 30–91 record. They finished in seventh place, ahead of another new team, the Washington Nationals. They were not connected to the Union Association Cowboys.

The Cowboys were admitted to the National League on a trial basis for the 1886 season. The team went out of business in February, 1887, having been forced to sell its players back to the league for $6,000. They were replaced in the league by Pittsburgh, which moved to the league from the American Association.

== See also ==
- 1886 Kansas City Cowboys season

== References and external links ==
- 1886 Cowboys at Baseball Reference
