= Frank Pears =

American baseball player (1866–1923)

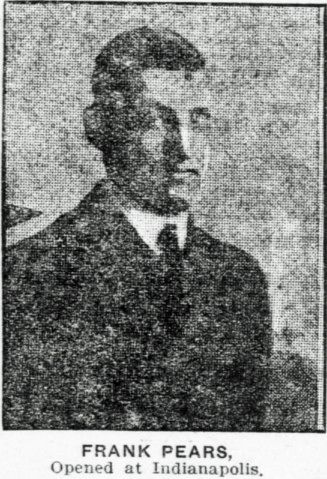
- Pitcher
- Born: August 30, 1866; Louisville, Kentucky, U.S.
- Died: November 29, 1923 (aged 57); St. Louis, Missouri, U.S.
- Batted: Unknown Threw: Right

MLB debut
- October 6, 1889, for the Kansas City Cowboys

Last MLB appearance
- August 1, 1893, for the St. Louis Browns

MLB statistics
- Win–loss record: 0-2
- Strikeouts: 5
- Earned run average: 6.23
- Stats at Baseball Reference

Teams
- Kansas City Cowboys (1889); St. Louis Browns (1893)

Frank H. Pears (August 30, 1866 – November 29, 1923) was an American Major League Baseball pitcher. He pitched in three games for the Kansas City Cowboys of the American Association in 1889 and in one game for the St. Louis Browns of the National League in 1893. He was still playing minor league ball as late as 1902, and was a player-manager in the minors in 1899.

== Sources ==
- Career statistics from Baseball Reference · Baseball Reference (Minors) · Retrosheet · Baseball Almanac
