= Red Bittmann =

American baseball player (1862–1929)

Red Bittman
- Second baseman
- Born: July 22, 1862; Cincinnati, Ohio, U.S.
- Died: November 8, 1929 (aged 67); Cincinnati, Ohio, U.S.
- Batted: Unknown Threw: Unknown

MLB debut
- October 10, 1889, for the Kansas City Cowboys

Last MLB appearance
- October 14, 1889, for the Kansas City Cowboys

MLB statistics
- Batting average: .286
- Home runs: 0
- Runs batted in: 2
- Stats at Baseball Reference

Teams
- Kansas City Cowboys (1889)

Henry Peter "Red" Bittman (July 22, 1862 – November 8, 1929) was an American second baseman and occasional umpire in Major League Baseball (MLB). He played one season for the Kansas City Cowboys.

== Playing career ==
In 1889, he played in the last four games for the Kansas City Cowboys of the American Association, from October 10 to October 14. He was the seventh person to play second base for the team during that season.

Bittman was an excellent fielder, handling 21 chances without an error. At the plate, he went 4-for-14 (.286) with 2 runs batted in and 2 runs scored, and his team went 2–2 against the Cincinnati Red Stockings and Louisville Colonels during his short run as a regular.

Bittman also occasionally served as an umpire, working a total of ten games – six of them behind the plate. His first experience was in Cincinnati for the American Association, five days before he played in his first game for the Cowboys. Then, he umpired nine National League games between 1892 and 1897.

== Sources ==
- Career statistics from Baseball Reference · Retrosheet · Baseball Almanac
