= Charlie Bell (baseball) =

American baseball player (1868–1937)

- Pitcher
- Born: August 12, 1868; Cincinnati
- Died: February 7, 1937 (aged 68); Cincinnati, Ohio
- Batted: Unknown Threw: Right

MLB debut
- October 13, 1889, for the Pittsburgh Pirates

Last MLB appearance
- July 27, 1891, for the Cincinnati Kelly's Killers

MLB statistics
- Win–loss record: 4–6
- Earned run average: 3.88
- Strikeouts: 20
- Stats at Baseball Reference

Teams
- Kansas City Cowboys (1889); Louisville Colonels (1891); Cincinnati Kelly's Killers (1891)

Charles C. Bell (August 12, 1868 – February 7, 1937) was an American professional baseball pitcher who pitched in the American Association. Bell was 1–0 with the Kansas City Cowboys (1889), 2-6 for the Louisville Colonels (1891), and 1-0 for the Cincinnati Kelly's Killers (1891).

He pitched in 12 games, completed 10 out of 11 starts, and had an ERA of 3.88 in 95 innings pitched. He also played one game in the outfield, giving him a total of 13 games played at the major league level. He had a batting average of .105 (4-for-38), but eight walks pushed his on-base percentage up to .261. He had four RBI and scored five runs.

Bell was a brother of former major league player Frank Bell, who played for the 1885 Brooklyn Grays.
