= Jim Burns (baseball) =

American baseball player

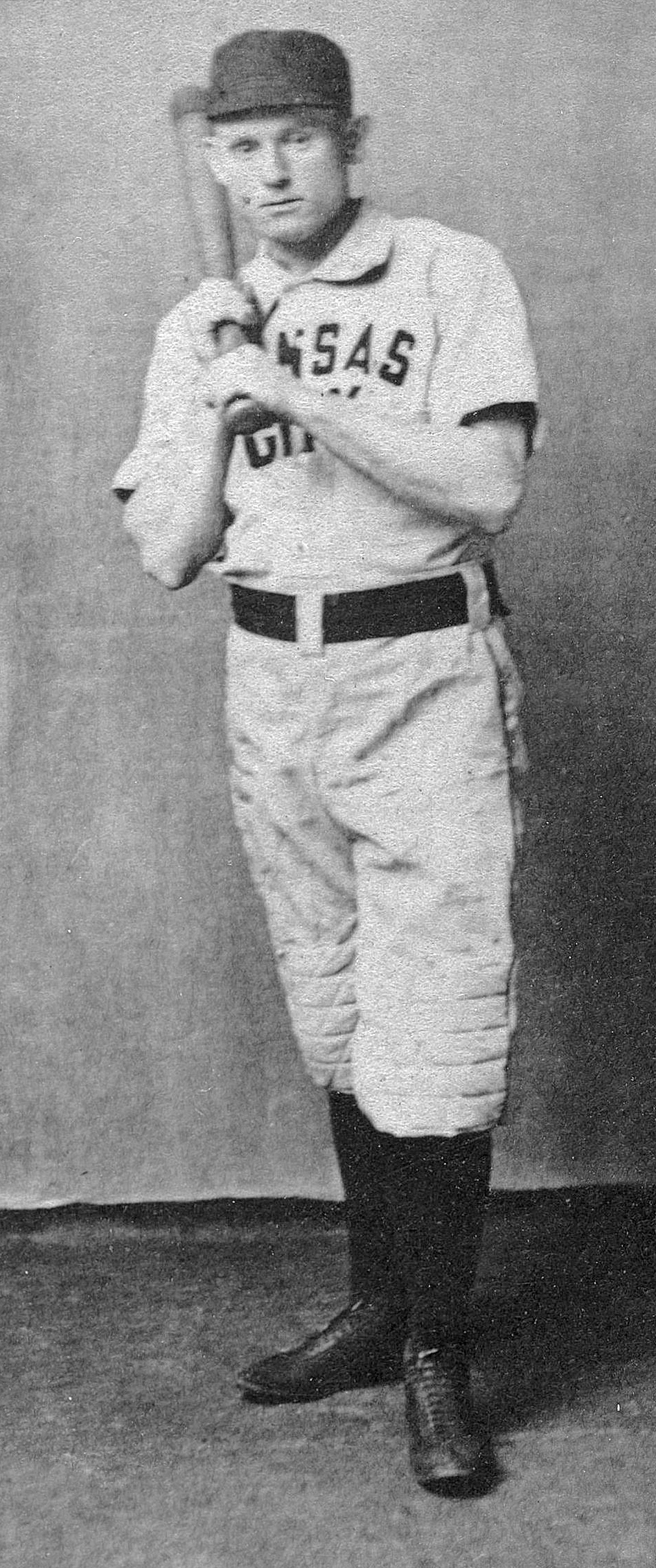
- Outfielder
- Born: Unknown; St. Louis, Missouri, U.S.
- Died: February 17, 1909; Chicago, Illinois, U.S.
- Batted: Right Threw: Unknown

MLB debut
- September 25, 1888, for the Kansas City Cowboys

Last MLB appearance
- May 22, 1891, for the Washington Statesmen

MLB statistics
- Batting average: .305
- Home runs: 5
- Runs batted in: 111
- Stats at Baseball Reference

Teams
- Kansas City Cowboys (1888–1889); Washington Statesmen (1891)

James Milton Burns (Unknown – February 17, 1909) was an American professional baseball outfielder. He played all or part of three seasons in the major leagues between 1888 and 1891, for the Kansas City Cowboys and Washington Statesmen in the American Association. He played in the minor leagues through 1896. He was 5’7 and weighed 168 lbs. at the time of his death.
