= Theodore Conover =

American baseball player (1868–1910)

- Pitcher
- Born: March 10, 1868; Lexington, Kentucky, U.S.
- Died: July 27, 1910 (aged 42); Paris, Kentucky, U.S.
- Batted: Right Threw: Right

MLB debut
- May 26, 1889, for the Cincinnati Red Stockings

Last MLB appearance
- May 26, 1889, for the Cincinnati Red Stockings

MLB statistics
- Win–loss record: 0-0
- Earned run average: 13.50
- Strikeouts: 1
- Stats at Baseball Reference

Teams
- Cincinnati Red Stockings (1889)

Theodore Conover (March 10, 1868 – July 27, 1910), nicknamed "Huck", was an American Major League Baseball player who pitched in one game for the Cincinnati Red Stockings of the American Association on May 26, 1889. He pitched two innings in the game, allowing four runs, three of which were earned. He continued to play in the minor leagues through 1897.
