= Joe Dowie =

American baseball player (1865–1917)

- Outfielder
- Born: July 15, 1865; New Orleans, Louisiana, U.S.
- Died: March 4, 1917 (aged 51); New Orleans, Louisiana, U.S.
- Batted: Unknown Threw: Unknown

MLB debut
- July 10, 1889, for the Baltimore Orioles

Last MLB appearance
- August 8, 1889, for the Baltimore Orioles

MLB statistics
- Batting average: .227
- Home runs: 0
- Runs batted in: 8
- Stats at Baseball Reference

Teams
- Baltimore Orioles (1889)

Joseph E. Dowie (July 15, 1865 – March 4, 1917) was an American professional baseball player. He was an outfielder for one season (1889) with the Baltimore Orioles. For his career, he compiled a .227 batting average in 75 at-bats, with eight runs batted in.

He was born and later died in New Orleans, Louisiana at the age of 51.
