= George Goetz =

American baseball player

- Pitcher
- Born: 1865; Greencastle, Pennsylvania
- Died: unknown
- Batted: Unknown Threw: Right

MLB debut
- June 17, 1889, for the Baltimore Orioles

Last MLB appearance
- June 17, 1889, for the Baltimore Orioles

MLB statistics
- Win–loss record: 1–0
- Earned run average: 4.00
- Strikeouts: 2
- Stats at Baseball Reference

Teams
- Baltimore Orioles (1889)

George Burt Goetz was a starting pitcher who played in Major League Baseball for the Baltimore Orioles of the American Association. He pitched in one game on June 17, 1889. This allowing four earned runs in nine innings.

== Sources ==
- Career statistics from Baseball Reference · Baseball Reference (Minors) · Retrosheet · Baseball Almanac
