= John Pickett (baseball) =

American baseball player (1866–1922)

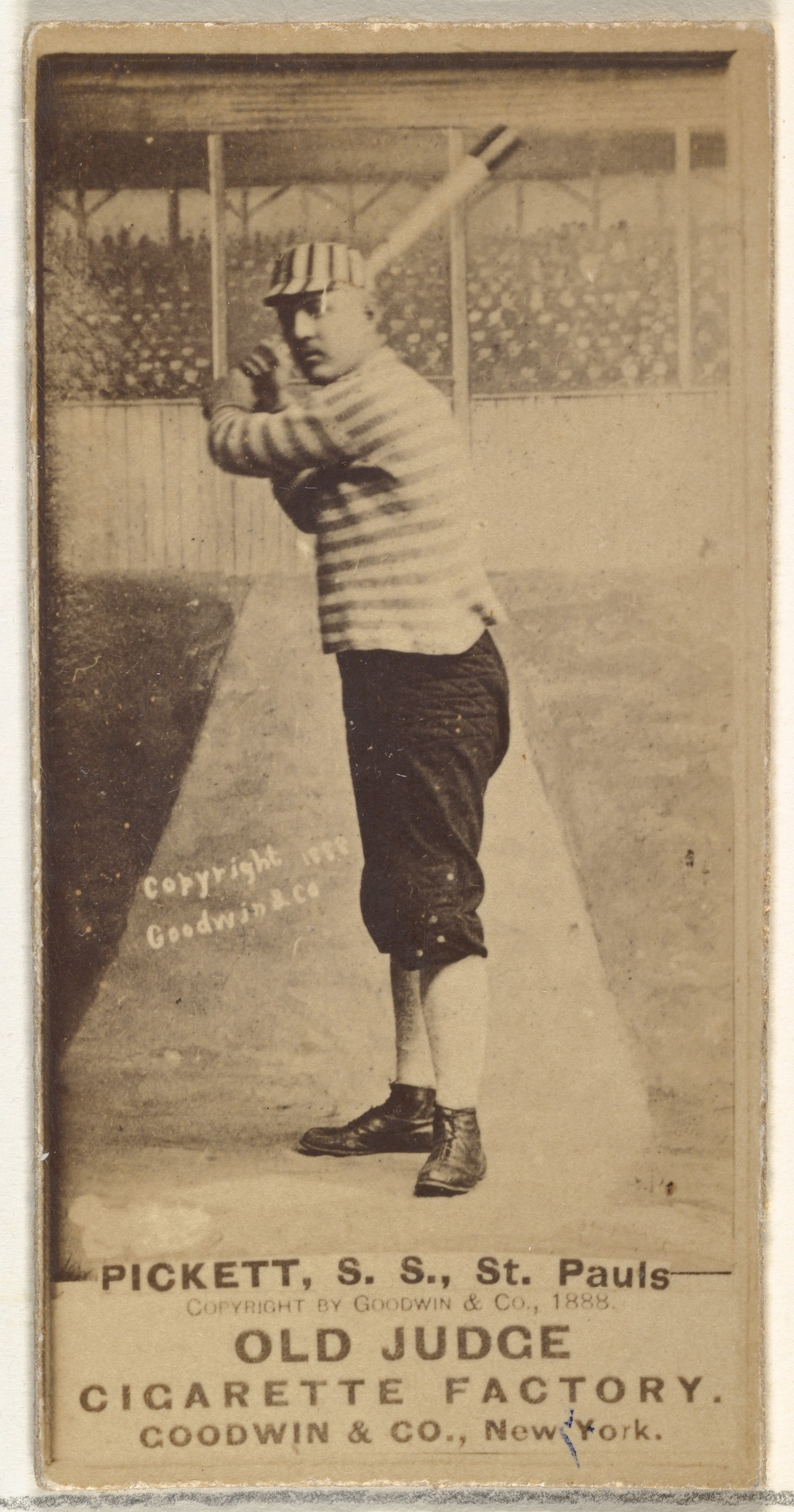
- Second baseman
- Born: February 20, 1866; Chicago, Illinois, U.S.
- Died: July 4, 1922 (aged 56); Chicago, Illinois, U.S.
- Batted: Right Threw: Right

MLB debut
- June 6, 1889, for the Kansas City Cowboys

Last MLB appearance
- June 1, 1892, for the Baltimore Orioles

MLB statistics
- Batting average: .252
- Home runs: 5
- Runs batted in: 88
- Stats at Baseball Reference

Teams
- Kansas City Cowboys (1889); Philadelphia Athletics (1890); Baltimore Orioles (1892)

John Thomas Pickett (February 20, 1866 - July 4, 1922) was an American professional baseball player who played infield in the Major Leagues from 1889-1892. He would play for the Baltimore Orioles, Philadelphia Athletics, and Kansas City Cowboys.
