= Jesse Duryea =

American baseball player (1859–1942)

- Pitcher
- Born: September 7, 1859; Osage, Iowa, U.S.
- Died: August 19, 1942 (aged 82); Algona, Iowa, U.S.
- Batted: Right Threw: Right

MLB debut
- April 20, 1889, for the Cincinnati Red Stockings

Last MLB appearance
- July 15, 1893, for the Washington Senators

MLB statistics
- Win–loss record: 59–67
- Earned run average: 3.45
- Strikeouts: 416
- Stats at Baseball Reference

Teams
- Cincinnati Red Stockings/Reds (1889–1892); St. Louis Browns (1891); Washington Senators (1892–1893)

James Newton "Jesse" Duryea (September 7, 1859 – August 19, 1942) was an American pitcher in Major League Baseball for six seasons. He made his big league debut for Cincinnati Red Stockings as a 29-year-old on April 20, 1889. He came to stay in Cincinnati for another three years, later with the Reds, until he was released in July 1892 and joined Washington Senators. He however played three games with St. Louis Browns the year earlier. During his 13 days long spell at St. Louis, he received his nickname "Cyclone Jim" by Ted Sullivan for his pitching abilities. He played his last MLB game for Washington Senators on July 15, 1893.
