= Jim Conway (baseball) =

American baseball player (1858–1912)

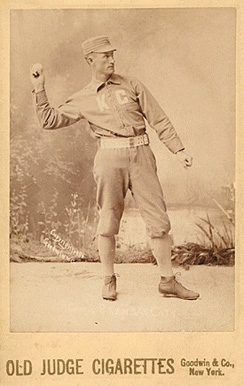
- Pitcher
- Born: October 8, 1858; Upper Darby Township, Pennsylvania, US
- Died: December 21, 1912 (aged 54); Clifton Heights, Pennsylvania, US
- Batted: Unknown Threw: Right

MLB debut
- May 5, 1884, for the Brooklyn Atlantics

Last MLB appearance
- October 5, 1889, for the Kansas City Cowboys

MLB statistics
- Win–loss record: 22-29
- Earned run average: 3.64
- Strikeouts: 140
- Stats at Baseball Reference

Teams
- Brooklyn Atlantics (1884); Philadelphia Athletics (1885); Kansas City Cowboys (1889)

James P. Conway (October 8, 1858 – December 21, 1912) was an American Major League Baseball player who pitched for the Brooklyn Atlantics, Philadelphia Athletics and Kansas City Cowboys, over the course of three seasons 1884–1885 and 1889. His brother Pete Conway, was a major league pitcher as well, most notably for the Detroit Wolverines.
