= Chippy McGarr =

American baseball player (1863–1904)

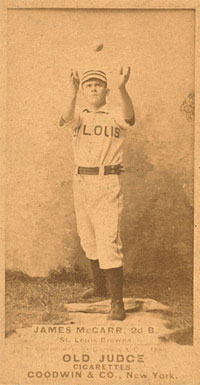
- 1888 baseball card of McGarr
- Third baseman
- Born: May 10, 1863; Worcester, Massachusetts, U.S.
- Died: June 6, 1904 (aged 41); Worcester, Massachusetts, U.S.
- Batted: Right Threw: Right

MLB debut
- July 11, 1884, for the Chicago Browns

Last MLB appearance
- September 26, 1896, for the Cleveland Spiders

MLB statistics
- Batting average: .269
- Home runs: 9
- Runs batted in: 388
- Stats at Baseball Reference

Teams
- Chicago Browns/Pittsburgh Stogies (1884); Philadelphia Athletics (1886–1887); St. Louis Browns (1888); Kansas City Cowboys (1889); Baltimore Orioles (1889); Boston Beaneaters (1890); Cleveland Spiders (1893–1896)

James B. "Chippy" McGarr (May 10, 1863 – June 6, 1904) was an American professional baseball third baseman who played in Major League Baseball from 1884 to 1896. He played for the Chicago Browns/Pittsburgh Stogies, Philadelphia Athletics, St. Louis Browns, Kansas City Cowboys, Baltimore Orioles, Boston Beaneaters, and Cleveland Spiders.

== See also ==
- List of Major League Baseball players to hit for the cycle

Achievements
Preceded by Jack Rowe	Hitting for the cycle September 23, 1886	Succeeded by Tip O'Neill
