= Charlie Reynolds (catcher) =

American baseball player (1865–1944)

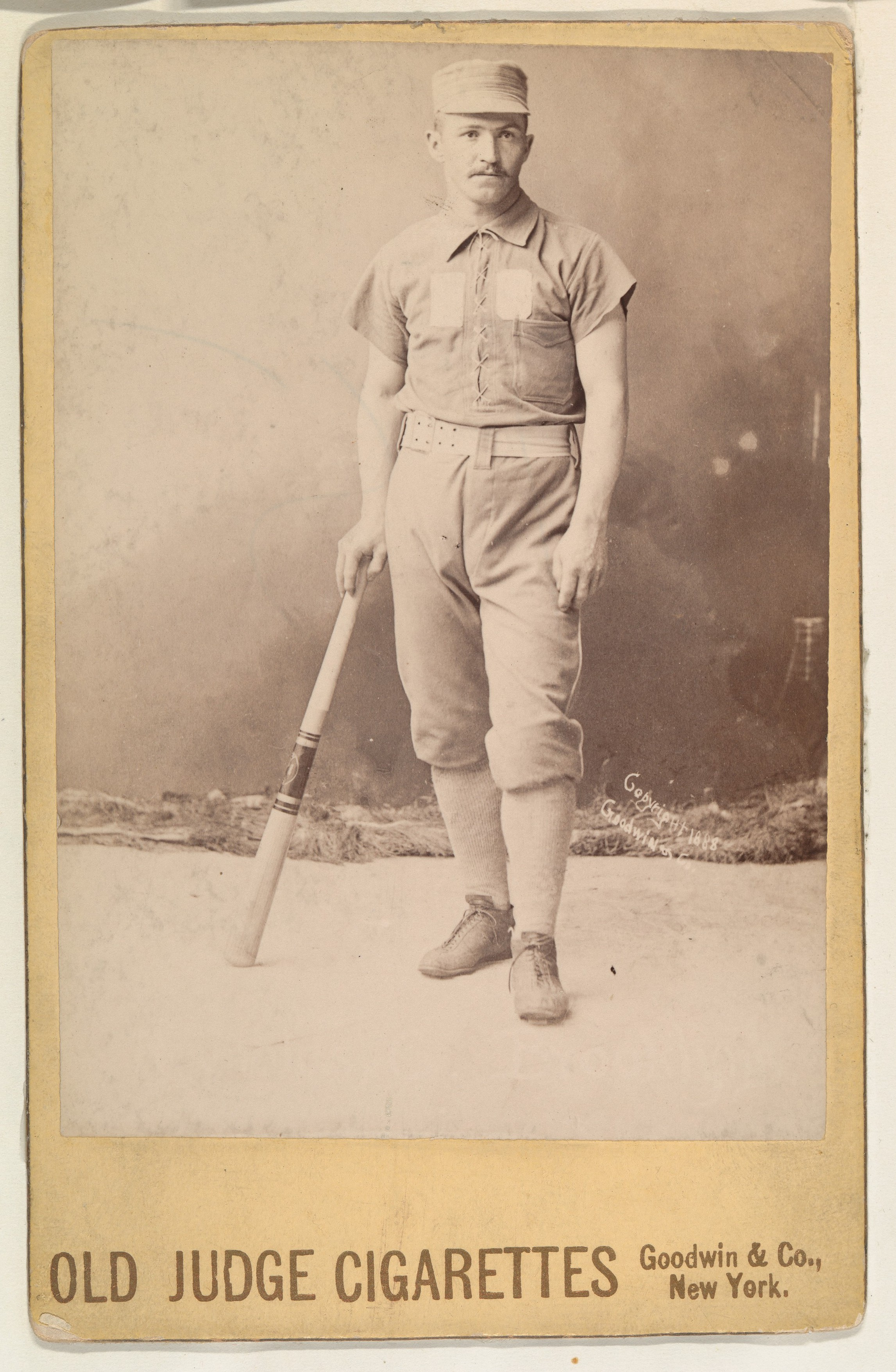
- Catcher
- Born: May 1, 1865; Williamsburg, Indiana, U.S.
- Died: July 3, 1944 (aged 79); Denver, Colorado, U.S.
- Batted: Unknown Threw: Unknown

MLB debut
- May 8, 1889, for the Kansas City Cowboys

Last MLB appearance
- August 19, 1889, for the Brooklyn Bridegrooms

MLB statistics
- Batting average: .217
- Home runs: 0
- Runs batted in: 4
- Stats at Baseball Reference

Teams
- Kansas City Cowboys (1889); Brooklyn Bridegrooms (1889)

Charles Lawrence Reynolds (May 1, 1865 – July 3, 1944) was an American catcher in Major League Baseball. He played in one game for the Kansas City Cowboys and 12 games for the Brooklyn Bridegrooms during the 1889 baseball season.
