= James Graham (baseball) =

American baseball player (1865–1935)

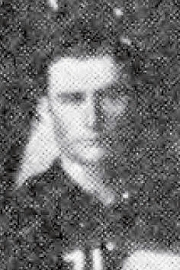
- Third baseman
- Born: January 8, 1865; Philadelphia, Pennsylvania, U.S.
- Died: February 17, 1935 (aged 70); Lebanon, Pennsylvania, U.S.
- Batted: Unknown Threw: Unknown

MLB debut
- September 4, 1889, for the Philadelphia Athletics

Last MLB appearance
- September 8, 1889, for the Philadelphia Athletics

MLB statistics
- Batting average: .167
- Home runs: 0
- Runs batted in: 0
- Stats at Baseball Reference

Teams
- Philadelphia Athletics (1889)

James Graham (January 8, 1865 – February 17, 1935) was an American Major League Baseball third baseman. He played for the Philadelphia Athletics of the American Association in four games during the 1889 season. He also played in the minor leagues from 1889 to 1897.
