= Charlie Hoover (baseball) =

American baseball player (1865–1905)

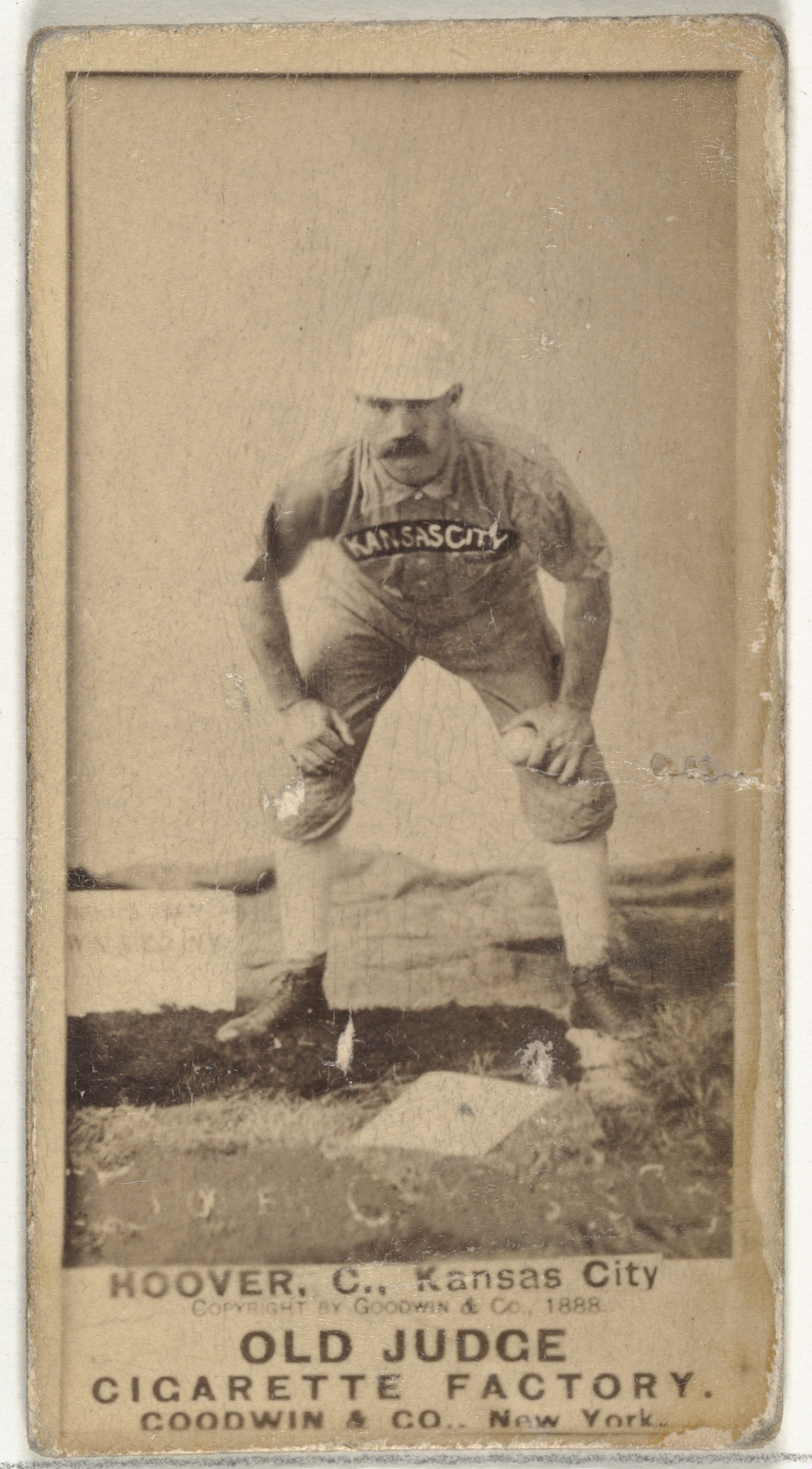
- Catcher
- Born: September 9, 1865; Mound City, Illinois, U.S.
- Died: February 27, 1905 (aged 39); Shreveport, Louisiana, U.S.
- Batted: Left Threw: Right

MLB debut
- October 8, 1888, for the Kansas City Cowboys

Last MLB appearance
- September 28, 1889, for the Kansas City Cowboys

MLB statistics
- Batting average: .250
- Home runs: 1
- Runs batted in: 26
- Stats at Baseball Reference

Teams
- Kansas City Cowboys (1888–1889)

Charles E. Hoover (September 9, 1865 – February 27, 1905) was an American catcher in Major League Baseball. He played for the Kansas City Cowboys in 1888 and 1889.
