= Mike Mattimore =

American baseball player (1858–1931)

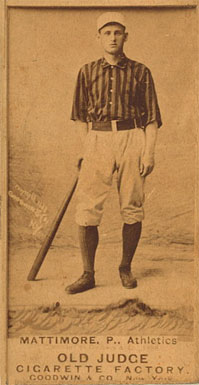
- Pitcher/Outfielder
- Born: August 1858; North Bend, Pennsylvania, U.S.
- Died: April 28, 1931 (aged 72); Butte, Montana, U.S.
- Batted: Left Threw: Left

MLB debut
- May 3, 1887, for the New York Giants

Last MLB appearance
- July 21, 1890, for the Brooklyn Gladiators

MLB statistics
- Win–loss record: 26-27
- Earned run average: 3.83
- Strikeouts: 132
- Stats at Baseball Reference

Teams
- New York Giants (1887); Philadelphia Athletics (1888–1889); Kansas City Cowboys (1889); Brooklyn Gladiators (1890)

Michael Joseph Mattimore (August 1858 – April 28, 1931) was a 19th-century American Major League Baseball player. He played for several teams in the National League and American Association between 1887 and 1890.
