= Sam Barkley =

American baseball player (1858–1912)

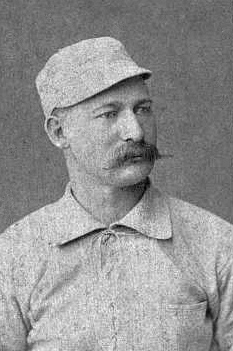
- Second baseman
- Born: May 24, 1858; Wheeling, Virginia, US
- Died: April 20, 1912 (aged 53); Wheeling, West Virginia, US
- Batted: Right Threw: Right

MLB debut
- May 1, 1884, for the Toledo Blue Stockings

Last MLB appearance
- July 12, 1889, for the Kansas City Cowboys

MLB statistics
- Batting average: .258
- Home runs: 10
- Runs batted in: 231
- Stats at Baseball Reference

Teams
- As player: Toledo Blue Stockings (1884); St. Louis Browns (1885); Pittsburgh Alleghenys (1886–1887); Kansas City Cowboys (1888–1889); As manager: Kansas City Cowboys (1888)

Career highlights and awards
- 1884 – Led the AA in doubles (39)

Samuel E. Barkley (May 24, 1858 – April 20, 1912) was an American Major League Baseball second baseman. Born in Wheeling, Virginia he played for four teams in six seasons from 1884 to 1889.

== Career ==
Barkley began his career with the Toledo Blue Stockings of the Northwestern League, and was a member of their championship team in 1883. He was still with the team when they joined the American Association for the 1884 season, and was the everyday second baseman. He batted .306 that season and led the league in doubles with 39. Following the season, Toledo and the St. Louis Browns made an arrangement in the off-season for a trade involving several players, but the trade broke down after the waiting period and only Barkley and one other player actually played with St. Louis. After a lawsuit it was estimated that Barkley had been valued for $800. Chris von der Ahe later claimed that Barkley's value was $1,000, but that may have been the asking price.

In March 1886, Browns owner Chris von der Ahe offered Barkley for $1000 to the first team to pay the money. Billy Barnie was able to have Barkley sign an undated contract with the Baltimore Orioles and wired the asking price to Von der Ahe, but he had already secured a deal with owner of the Pittsburgh Alleghenys, Denny McKnight, and Sam was convinced to play for the Allegheny club instead. The American Association suspended and fined Barkley for signing with Pittsburgh this action. Barkley sued the Association, but they settled out of court with suspension being lifted although the fine stayed in place. Baltimore was offered and accepted Milt Scott as payment.

That first season with Pittsburgh, the 1886 season, he hit .266 with 31 doubles, and he also stole 22 bases, while playing in 122 games. His stats declined significantly in 1887, only playing in 89 games, hitting only .224. After the season was over, Pittsburgh sold him to the Kansas City Cowboys of the American Association.

He was given good playing time in 1888 by the Cowboys, playing in 116 games, but his batting average slid further down, to .216, but the season was not uneventful. On June 13, he hit for the cycle, and he was given the managerial reins, which lasted 58 games and 21 wins.

A knee injury ended his baseball career.

== Post-baseball career ==
After his career in baseball ended, Barkley opened a cigar shop in Pittsburgh. After the cigar shop closed, Barkley and his wife Dora moved to Chicago. In Chicago he opened a saloon.

Barkley died at the age of 53 in his hometown of Wheeling, and was buried in Peninsula Cemetery.

== Personal life ==
Barkley married Flora "Dora" Feldman, who took the name Dora Feldman Barkley after marriage. She was a young woman who he had met while playing in Kansas City. Dora, at the age of 18, grew infatuated with Barlkey and ran away from home to pursue him. Feldman stalked Barkley, and, at a Kansas City hotel room where he was staying, confronted him and threatened to commit suicide if he did not marry her. While he initially believed the young woman to be insane, he ultimately wed her, and they soon after had a child named Harold Barkley together. When they lived in Chicago, Dora, working as an actress, began a public affair with political boss, and former crime boss, Michael Cassius McDonald, who she had known in her childhood. It is believed that Barkley was paid $30,000 by McDonald to divorce his wife. The two divorced, and she wed McDonald, who also adopted the son he had with Dora, who would become known as Harold McDonald.

== See also ==
- List of Major League Baseball annual doubles leaders
- List of Major League Baseball player–managers
- List of Major League Baseball players to hit for the cycle

Achievements
Preceded by Harry Stovey	Hitting for the cycle June 13, 1888	Succeeded by Jimmy Ryan
