= Exposition Park (Kansas City) =

Baseball venue in Kansas City, Missouri

- Exposition Park area in 1896
- Interactive map of Exposition Park
- Location: Kansas City, Missouri, U.S.
- Coordinates: 39°5′44″N 94°32′59″W

Tenant
- Kansas City Cowboys (AA) (1888–1889)

Exposition Park is a former baseball ground located in Kansas City, Missouri, United States. The ground was home to the Kansas City Cowboys of the American Association for the 1888 and 1889 seasons.

It was located at 15th and Montgall from 1888 to 1902 in the 18th and Vine-Downtown East, Kansas City neighborhood. It was on the grounds of the Kansas City exposition park which had opened in 1886 between 12th and 15th Street on Kansas Street—the center piece of which was an 80,000 square foot building modeled on The Crystal Palace until it was destroyed in 1901 in a fire that had occurred just a week after plans were announced to dismantle it.

The exact location and orientation of the ballpark, per Sanborn maps, was East 15th Street (now Truman Avenue) (south, first base); the imaginary line of what is now the west edge of Montgall Avenue (and formerly the Exposition Driving Park Speeding Stables) (west, third base); the imaginary line of what is now the north edge of East 14th Street (and formerly the Exposition Driving Park) (north, left field); roughly the western edge of the parking lot between Chestnut and Kansas Avenue (formerly the training areas of the park) (east, right field).

The first football game between Kansas and Missouri was played here on October 31, 1891 (Kansas beat Missouri 22–8 before a crowd of about 3,000). Exposition Park also played host to a game between the Chicago Cubs and St. Louis Cardinals on October 15, 1892. Until 2023, this was the only time the National League rivals had met outside their respective cities.

It was site of one of the first night games when the Kansas City Blues played the Sioux City Cornhuskers on August 28, 1894—an event in which the players dressed in costume. The Cornhuskers were bought by Charles Comiskey following the 1894 season and eventually became the Chicago White Sox.

The stadium was also home to other Kansas City teams: the Kansas City Blues of the American Association and the Kansas City Maroons.
