= Kansas City Cowboys (American Association) =

Information
- League: American Association (1888–1889)
- Location: Kansas City, Missouri
- Ballpark: Exposition Park (1888–1889)
- Founded: 1888
- Folded: 1889
- Former ballpark: Association Park (1888)
- Manager: List of managers: Bill Watkins (1888–1889); Sam Barkley (1888); Dave Rowe (1888)

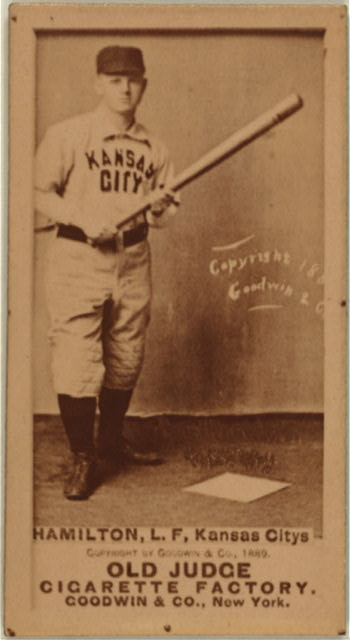
Billy Hamilton of the Kansas City Cowboys on an 1887-1890 Goodwin & Company baseball card (Old Judge (N172)).

The Kansas City Cowboys were a professional baseball team based in Kansas City, Missouri, for two seasons in 1888 to 1889 in the American Association. They were the third, and last iteration of this franchise name, following the Kansas City Cowboys of the Union Association in 1884 and the Kansas City Cowboys of the National League in 1886. The franchise used Association Park as their home field in 1888, then moved to Exposition Park for the last game that season, and all of 1889.

The team began the 1888 season on April 18 with part-time outfielder Dave Rowe as their player-manager. They lost their first game, 10–3, to Tony Mullane and the Cincinnati Reds, but won the next day. They compiled a win–loss record of 43–89 in their initial season, finishing last out of the league's eight teams, and went through two managerial changes. The season had a few bright moments: on June 6, Henry Porter threw a no-hitter, and on June 13, Sam Barkley hit for the cycle. The franchise's only future Hall of Fame player, "Slidin'" Billy Hamilton, began his career as a part-time outfielder in 1888, and was their starting right fielder in 1889. Bill Watkins, who had finished the 1888 season as the team's manager, stayed in that role for the full 1889 season, and guided them to an improved win–loss record of 55–82, with two ties, finishing seventh among the league's eight teams.

== See also ==
- 1888 Kansas City Cowboys season
- 1889 Kansas City Cowboys season
- Kansas City Cowboys (AA) all-time roster
