= 1884 in baseball =

The following are the baseball events of the year 1884 throughout the world.

== Champions ==
- First World's Championship Series: Providence Grays over New York Metropolitans (3–0)
- National League: Providence Grays
- American Association: New York Metropolitans
- Union Association: St. Louis Maroons

== Statistical leaders ==
Any team shown in small text indicates a previous team a player was on during the season.

	American Association		National League		Union Association	
Stat	Player	Total	Player	Total	Player	Total
AVG	Dave Orr (NYM)	.354	King Kelly (CHI)	.354	Fred Dunlap (SLM)	.412
HR	John Reilly (CIN)	11	Ned Williamson (CHI)	27	Fred Dunlap (SLM)	13
RBI	Dave Orr (NYM)	112	Cap Anson (CHI)	102	Unavailable	
W	Guy Hecker^{1} (LOU)	52	Charles Radbourn^{2 3} (PRO)	59	Bill Sweeney (BLU)	40
ERA	Guy Hecker^{1} (LOU)	1.80	Charles Radbourn^{2} (PRO)	1.38	Jim McCormick (COR)	1.54
K	Guy Hecker^{1} (LOU)	385	Charles Radbourn^{2} (PRO)	441	Hugh Daily (WST/CUN)	483

^{1} American Association Triple Crown pitching winner
^{2} National League Triple Crown pitching winner
^{3} All-time single-season wins record

== Major league baseball final standings ==
=== American Association final standings ===
American Association
Team	W	L	Pct.	GB	Home	Road
New York Metropolitans	75	32	.701	—	42‍–‍9	33‍–‍23
Columbus Buckeyes	69	39	.639	6½	38‍–‍16	31‍–‍23
Louisville Eclipse	68	40	.630	7½	41‍–‍14	27‍–‍26
St. Louis Browns	67	40	.626	8	38‍–‍16	29‍–‍24
Cincinnati Red Stockings	68	41	.624	8	40‍–‍16	28‍–‍25
Baltimore Orioles	63	43	.594	11½	42‍–‍13	21‍–‍30
Philadelphia Athletics	61	46	.570	14	38‍–‍16	23‍–‍30
Toledo Blue Stockings	46	58	.442	27½	28‍–‍25	18‍–‍33
Brooklyn Atlantics	40	64	.385	33½	23‍–‍26	17‍–‍38
Richmond Virginians	12	30	.286	30½	5‍–‍15	7‍–‍15
Pittsburgh Alleghenys	30	78	.278	45½	18‍–‍37	12‍–‍41
Indianapolis Hoosiers	29	78	.271	46	15‍–‍39	14‍–‍39
Washington Nationals	12	51	.190	41	10‍–‍20	2‍–‍31

Locations of teams for the 1884 American Association season
American Association

=== National League final standings ===
National League
Team	W	L	Pct.	GB	Home	Road
Providence Grays	84	28	.750	—	45‍–‍11	39‍–‍17
Boston Beaneaters	73	38	.658	10½	40‍–‍16	33‍–‍22
Buffalo Bisons	64	47	.577	19½	37‍–‍18	27‍–‍29
New York Gothams	62	50	.554	22	34‍–‍22	28‍–‍28
Chicago White Stockings	62	50	.554	22	39‍–‍17	23‍–‍33
Philadelphia Quakers	39	73	.348	45	19‍–‍37	20‍–‍36
Cleveland Blues	35	77	.312	49	22‍–‍34	13‍–‍43
Detroit Wolverines	28	84	.250	56	18‍–‍38	10‍–‍46

Locations of teams for the 1884 National League season
National League

=== Union Association final standings ===
Union Association
Team	W	L	Pct.	GB	Home	Road
St. Louis Maroons	94	19	.832	—	49‍–‍6	45‍–‍13
Cincinnati Outlaw Reds	69	36	.657	21	35‍–‍17	34‍–‍19
Baltimore Monumentals	58	47	.552	32	29‍–‍21	29‍–‍26
Boston Reds	58	51	.532	34	34‍–‍22	24‍–‍29
Milwaukee Brewers	8	4	.667	35½	8‍–‍4	0‍–‍0
St. Paul Saints	2	6	.250	39½	0‍–‍0	2‍–‍6
Chicago Browns/Pittsburgh Stogies	41	50	.451	42	21‍–‍19	20‍–‍31
Altoona Mountain Citys	6	19	.240	44	6‍–‍12	0‍–‍7
Wilmington Quicksteps	2	16	.111	44½	1‍–‍6	1‍–‍10
Washington Nationals (UA)	47	65	.420	46½	36‍–‍27	11‍–‍38
Philadelphia Keystones	21	46	.313	50	14‍–‍21	7‍–‍25
Kansas City Cowboys	16	63	.203	61	11‍–‍23	5‍–‍40

Locations of teams for the 1884 Union Association season
Union Association
*Chicago Browns moved to Pittsburgh mid-way through the season as the Pittsburgh Stogies.

== All-Time Statistical Leaders (Strikeouts) ==
The 1884 season was memorable in that six of the top 10 all-time Major League Baseball single season strikeout totals were set that season:

Pitcher	Strikeouts	Season	Team	League	Overall Rank
Hugh Daily	483	1884	Chicago Browns/Pittsburgh Stogies / Washington Nationals	UA	3
Dupee Shaw	451	1884	Detroit Wolverines / Boston Reds	NL/UA	4
Old Hoss Radbourn	441	1884	Providence Grays	NL	5
Charlie Buffington	417	1884	Boston Beaneaters	NL	6
Guy Hecker	385	1884	Louisville Eclipse	AA	7
Bill Sweeney	374	1884	Baltimore Monumentals	UA	10

== Notable seasons ==
Old Hoss Radbourn won a record 59 or 60 games (depending on the sources), a record that will almost certainly never be broken. In addition to wins, Radbourn led the National League in games (75), games started (73), complete games (73), ERA (1.38), saves (2), strikeouts (441), and innings pitched (678.2).

The season record for pitching strikeouts (369, by Tim Keefe 1883) is broken by seven players, with Hugh Daily beating Keefe's record by 114. To this day (as of 2020), six of the top ten strikeout seasons were accomplished in 1884 (including five of the top seven). 1884 was the first season in which pitchers were allowed to throw overhand.

== Events ==
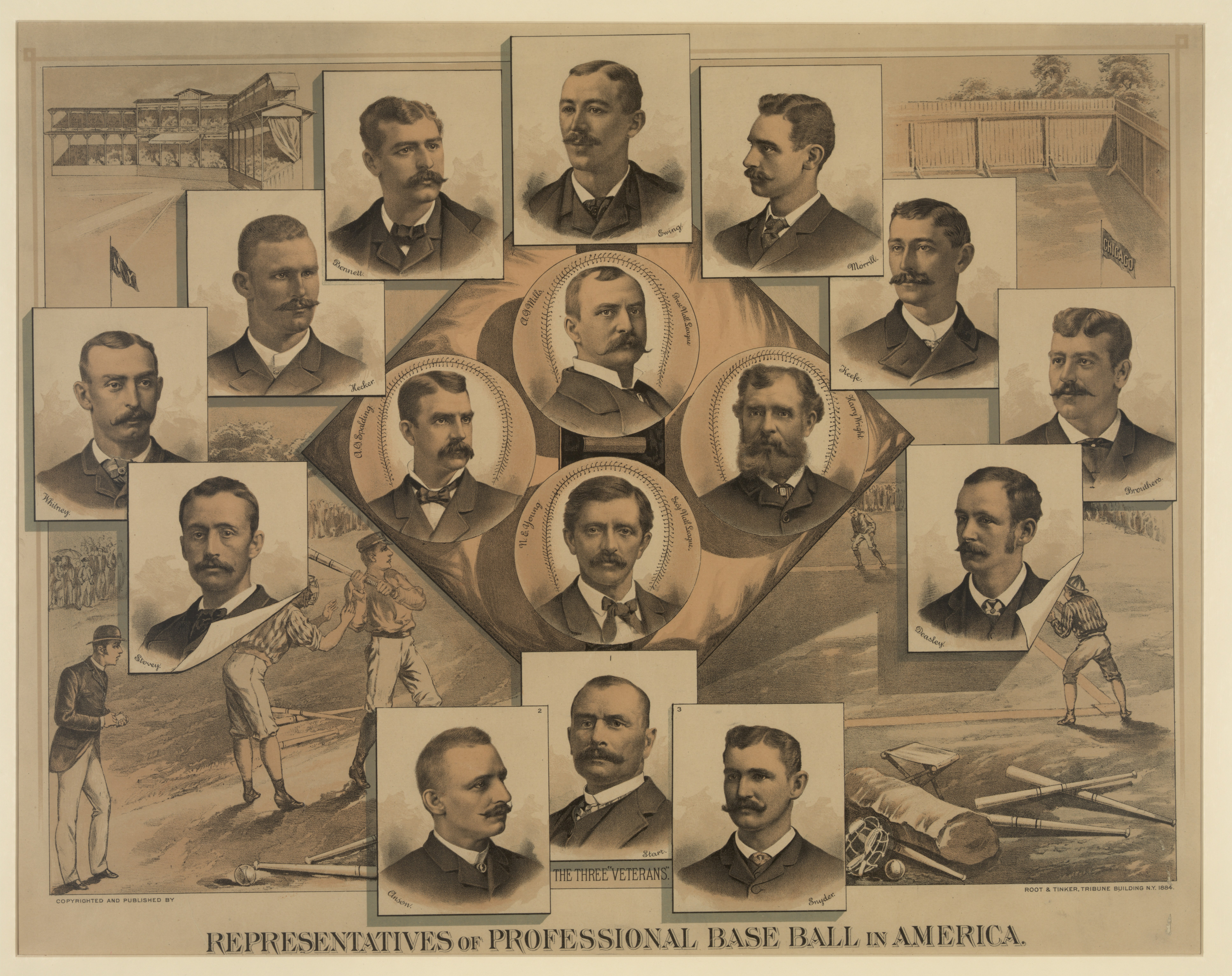
Key people in baseball 1884

=== January–March ===
- February 18 – Terry Larkin, recently released from prison after shooting his wife and a police officer in 1883, is arrested again for threatening to shoot his father. Larkin will be released and play this season for the Richmond Virginians. Larkin was later institutionalized after challenging his former employer to a duel, and committed suicide by slitting his throat with a razor in 1894.
- February 20 – The Altoona Mountain City club is admitted to the new Union Association as its seventh club, leaving Lancaster as the only franchise in the Inter-State League.
- March 4 – The National League reduces the number of balls needed for a walk to six. Team owners also agree to provide two separate benches for the teams in order to cut down on player fraternizing during games.
- March 15 – Henry Chadwick writes in a newspaper column that a ground-keeper in St. Louis has started placing tarpaulins over the bases when it rains in order to keep them dry. Other clubs will follow suit and cover the pitching area and batter areas as well.
- March 17 – The Union Association admits the Boston Reds, run by George Wright, as a new team to the league.
- March 28 – Umpire William McLean throws a bat into the stands, striking a spectator, in reaction to taunts from the crowd. McLean is arrested but not charged as the fan is not injured.

=== April–June ===
- April 17 – The Union Association opens its inaugural season with 3 games.
- May 1 – Moses Fleetwood Walker becomes the first black player to play in the major leagues. Walker will play in 42 games for the Toledo Blue Stockings, have 152 at-bats and get 40 hits in his only season in major league baseball. Facing racism constantly, even his own teammates refuse to play with him. An injury in mid-July effectively ends Walker's season and he is later released. No other African-American will play in the major leagues until Jackie Robinson in 1947.
- May 1 – The Cincinnati Red Stockings of the American Association has a section of their stands collapse as fans are leaving the park following their opening day game. There are numerous injuries including a broken arm. Reds' ownership covered all medical expenses for those injured.
- May 5 – After pitching in St. Louis the previous day, Tony Mullane of the Toledo Blue Stockings is barred by a court from pitching in the state of Missouri until his case involving his contract jumping is settled.
- May 6 – Larry McKeon of the Indianapolis Hoosiers pitches a 6-inning no-hitter. The game is called due to rain with the score tied 0–0. McKeon will go on to lose 41 games in 1884.
- May 16 – A foul tip off the bat of a Detroit Wolverines player sticks in the face mask of Boston Beaneaters catcher Mike Hines. Umpire Van Court rules it a catch and calls the batter out. National League secretary Nicholas Young will instruct all NL umpires to not call an out in that scenario again.
- May 22 – The Indianapolis Hoosiers release catcher George Mundinger and pitcher Pete Fries.
- May 24
  - Al Atkinson of the Philadelphia Athletics retires the final 27 batters in pitching a no-hitter over the Pittsburgh Alleghenys. Atkinson hit the lead off batter, Ed Swartwood, who stole second, moved to third on a ground out and scored on a wild pitch, then did not allow another base runner in the 10–1 victory.
  - The St. Louis Maroons of the Union Association, after starting the season with 20 consecutive wins, lose their first game of the year.
- May 29
  - Ed Morris of the Columbus Buckeyes pitches a no-hitter against the Pittsburgh Alleghenys in an American Association game.
  - The Chicago White Stockings hit 5 over-the-fence home runs in their home opener against the Detroit Wolverines. The White Stockings new ground rule allows a home run instead of a double for any ball hit in the air over the 180' left field fence or the 215' right field fence. After Chicago increases their home run output from 13 in 1883 to 142 this season, the National League will mandate a minimum fence distance of 210 feet beginning in 1885.
- May 30 – Ned Williamson of the Chicago White Stockings becomes the first player to hit 3 home runs in one game in Chicago's 12–2 win over the Detroit Wolverines.
- May 31 – Altoona Mountain City drops out of the Union Association and folds, being replaced by the Kansas City Cowboys. Teams leaving and entering will become a recurring theme during the UA's one and only season.
- June 5 – Frank Mountain of the Columbus Buckeyes pitches a no-hitter and hits a home run in a 12–0 victory.
- June 7 – Charlie Sweeney of the Providence Grays strikes out 19 batters in a game to set a record that will last for over 100 years.
- June 10 – Larry Corcoran of the Chicago White Stockings switch-pitches in a 2–0 win over the Cleveland Blues.
- June 13 – The Baltimore Orioles place a barbed-wire fence around the field after the crowd swarmed the field and threatened the umpire in the previous day's game.
- June 16 – Buffalo Bisons outfielder Jim O'Rourke hits for the cycle as the Bisons crush the Chicago White Stockings, 20–9.
- June 20 – The Toledo Blue Stockings sign catcher Deacon McGuire.
- June 27 – Larry Corcoran of the Chicago White Stockings throws a no-hitter against the Providence Grays. It is the 3rd no-hitter of Corcoran's career and the first in the National League this season.
- June 28 – While playing a Sunday game in Toledo, the players are arrested in the 6th inning for violating the city ordinance banning Sunday baseball. Due to the unruly crowd, the police allow the players to complete the game. The Brooklyn Atlantics defeat Toledo 5–3 before players from both teams are taken into custody.

=== July–September ===
- 1884 – In American Association action, Guy Hecker of the Louisville Eclipse pitches complete games to win both ends of a doubleheader. Hecker does not walk a single batter in this day as he beats the Brooklyn Atlantics, 5–4 and 8–2.
- July 5 – Al Atkinson jumps from the American Association Philadelphia Athletics to the Union Association Chicago Browns, the first player to jump mid-season to the new league.
- July 7 – Hugh Daily strikes out 19, tying the record set a month earlier while throwing a one-hitter in the process.
- July 10 – Hugh Daily of the Chicago Browns pitches his second consecutive one-hitter. Daily will pitch four one-hitters by season's end, setting a major league record.
- July 11 – Billy Taylor, who had a 25–4 record for the St. Louis Maroons in the Union Association, jumps to the Philadelphia Athletics of the American Association and wins the first of 17 games for Philadelphia, ending with a combined 43–16 record.
- July 28 – Charles Radbourn gains a victory in relief for the Providence Grays in the game that provides the point of contention as to whether Radbourn won 59 games or 60 in 1884. The Grays were trailing 4–3 when starting pitcher Cyclone Miller finished pitching in the bottom of the 5th inning. Providence scored 4 runs in the top of the 6th to take the lead, then Radbourn came in to pitch starting in the bottom of the 6th. Under the scoring rules of the day, Radbourn was credited with the win. Miller would have gotten the victory under today's scoring rules, hence the discrepancy in total wins for Radbourn.
- August 4 – Pud Galvin of the Buffalo Bisons pitches a no-hitter against the Detroit Wolverines.
- August 5 – Thomas Lynch, a deaf-mute, makes his major league debut for the Chicago White Stockings in the pitcher's box and is winning until he tires in the eighth inning. Cap Anson, who had hit two homers in the game, relieves him and promptly loses 8–5. Lynch will never appear in another major league game.
- August 6 – Cap Anson hits three home runs in a 13–4 win, giving him five homers in his last two games.
- August 21 – Charlie Geggus pitches a no-hitter for the Washington Nationals of the Union Association. The game is halted after eight innings as the Nationals defeat the Wilmington Quicksteps 12–1.
- August 25 – The Chicago Browns of the Union Association, after losing $15,000 in Chicago, move to Pittsburgh and become the Pittsburgh Stogies. They defeated the first-place St. Louis Maroons in their first official game in Pittsburgh on this day.
- August 26 – Dick Burns of the Cincinnati Outlaw Reds pitches a no-hitter against the Kansas City Cowboys.
- August 28 – Mickey Welch strikes out the first 9 batters of the game to set a record that would not be broken until 1970 by Tom Seaver.
- August 29 – The St. Louis Maroons win the only Union Association pennant with a 7–2 win over the Pittsburgh Stogies.
- September 11 – When no umpire shows up for the American Association game between the Philadelphia Athletics and the Toledo Blue Stockings, rookie pitcher Hank O'Day of Toledo fills in as a substitute. After his playing career, O'Day would later be recognized as the best umpire of the first quarter of the 20th century and would be the umpire to make the famous call involving Fred Merkle in 1908.
- September 15
  - Manager Joe Simmons of the Wilmington Quicksteps pulls his team off the field before a home game against the Kansas City Cowboys when he realizes he will be unable to pay the required $60 gate fee to the visiting Cowboys as the attendance is zero. The visiting Cowboys are 7–55–2 (.112) while the Quicksteps are 2–16 (.111) and occupy the cellar in the Union Association standings; following this, the Quicksteps drop out of the Association and disband.
  - The Providence Grays win the National League pennant with a 10–2 win over the Cleveland Blues.
- September 19 – The Union Association replaces the Wilmington Quicksteps and Pittsburgh Stogies and with the Milwaukee Brewers and a team from Omaha sponsored by the Union Pacific Railroad.
- September 27 – Before playing a single game in the Union Association, Omaha is replaced by the St. Paul Saints.
- September 28 – Ed Cushman of the Milwaukee Brewers pitches a no-hitter in the Brewer's 2nd game in the Union Association.
- September 29 – Moses Fleetwood Walker, the first African-American to play in the major leagues, is released by the Toledo Blue Stockings. Walker never again played in the major leagues and the color barrier would not be broken for over sixty years.

=== October–December ===
- October 1
  - Charlie Getzien of the Detroit Wolverines pitches a no-hitter in a game called after 6 innings as Detroit wins 1–0.
  - The New York Metropolitans clinch the American Association pennant with a 4–1 victory over the Columbus Buckeyes.
- October 3 – Henry Porter playing for the Milwaukee Brewers of the Union Association strikes out 18 batters in one game against the Boston Reds and still loses, a record that stood until broken by Steve Carlton in 1969.
- October 4
  - In his first start since his no-hitter on September 28, Ed Cushman takes another no-hitter into the 9th inning only to give up a bloop single and finish with a 1-hitter.
  - Sam Kimber of the Brooklyn Atlantics pitches a 10-inning no-hitter that ends in a 0–0 tie after the game is called because of darkness.
- October 5 – Charlie Sweeney and Henry Boyle of the St. Louis Maroons combine on a 5 inning no-hitter when the game is called on account of rain. Despite the no-hitter, the Maroons lose 1–0 when 2 errors allow the only run of the game.
- October 9 – Jack Manning only hits 14 career home runs in a career that spans 12 seasons and over 800 games, but he hits 3 out on this day at the Chicago White Stockings cozy Lake Front Park.
- October 23 – The Providence Grays, champions of the National League, behind the pitching of Charley Radbourn, defeat the American Association champion New York Metropolitans 6–0 at the Polo Grounds in New York City.
- October 24 – The Providence Grays take the 2nd game of the best of 3 series against the New York Metropolitans by a score of 3–1. The game at the Polo Grounds is called after 7 innings because of darkness.
- October 25 – The Providence Grays complete the sweep of the New York Metropolitans with a 12–2 win in a game called after 6 innings because of extreme cold and an attendance of only 300 at the Polo Grounds. Charley Radbourn, after winning 59 games during the regular season, wins all 3 games for Providence while allowing no earned runs.
- October 30 – The Columbus Buckeyes of the American Association sell their players to the Pittsburgh Alleghenys for $6,000 and disband the team.
- November 4 – Tony Mullane signs a contract with the Cincinnati Red Stockings for the 1885 season, in direct conflict with his prior oral agreement to play for the St. Louis Browns. The American Association will suspend Mullane for the entire 1885 season because of this and previous contract troubles, but allow him to remain the property of Cincinnati.
- November 19 – National League president A. G. Mills resigns and league secretary Nick Young replaces him.
- November 20 – The National League votes to allow overhand pitching for the 1885 season, although there are restrictions placed on the delivery in order to keep velocity down. In addition, teams are now required to supply a separate bench for each club at their park to limit inter-team fraternization.
- December 11 – The American Association votes to continue their ban on overhand pitching.
- December 18 – The Union Association has only four teams in attendance at their winter meetings. The UA will officially fold in early 1885.

== Births ==
=== January–April ===
- January 1 – Tom Downey
- January 4 – Al Bridwell
- January 26 – Tubby Spencer
- February 1
  - Joe Connolly
  - Rosey Rowswell
  - Candy Jim Taylor
- February 10 – Billy Evans
- February 14 – Jack Lewis
- February 25 – Bob Bescher
- March 4 – Red Murray
- March 7
  - Sam Bennett
  - Ed Willett
- March 19 – Clyde Engle
- March 21 – Mysterious Walker
- March 31 – Frank Truesdale
- April 6 – Rudy Schwenck
- April 7 – Jake Daubert
- April 20 – Mike Mowrey
- April 25 – John Henry "Pop" Lloyd

=== May–August ===
- May 5 – Chief Bender
- May 13 – Bert Niehoff
- May 16 – Peter McLaughlin
- May 20 – Paul Howard
- May 26 – Jimmy Lavender
- May 30 – Rube Oldring
- June 7 – George Moriarty
- June 12 – Otto Knabe
- June 16 – Bob Peterson
- June 19 – Eddie Cicotte
- June 23 – Dick Egan
- July 4 – Jack Warhop
- August 6
  - Sherry Magee
  - Joe Birmingham

=== September–December ===
- September 7 – Earl Moseley*
- September 14 – Willie Hogan
- September 22 – Grover Land
- September 30 – Nap Rucker
- October 18 – Burt Shotton
- October 28 – Chet Chadbourne
- November 3 – Charley Stis
- November 15 – Red Kelly
- November 24 – Tullie McAdoo
- December 1 – Charley Moore
- December 4 – Biff Schlitzer
- December 5 – Ed Summers
- December 10 – Art Griggs
- December 15 – Jim Nealon
- December 31 – Bobby Byrne

* Some sources show 1887

== Deaths ==
- March 16 – Art Croft, 29, first baseman and left fielder for 1877 St. Lous and 1878 Indianapolis teams.
- April 29 – John Morrissey, 27, played in 1881 for the Buffalo Bisons.
- July 11 – Bill Smiley, 28?, utility player who played mainly in 1882.
- September 26 – Jim Egan, 26?, pitcher for the 1882 Troy Trojans.
- November 13 – Bill Sullivan, 31, played in 2 games for the 1878 Chicago White Stockings.
