= 1884 Washington Nationals season =

1884 Washington Nationals
- League: American Association
- Ballpark: Athletic Park
- City: Washington, D.C.
- Record: 12–51 (.190)
- League place: 13th
- Manager: Holly Hollingshead

The 1884 Washington Nationals (sometimes called the Washington Statesmen) had a 12–51 record in the American Association when the team folded without finishing the season.

== Regular season ==
=== Season standings ===
American Association
Team	W	L	Pct.	GB	Home	Road
New York Metropolitans	75	32	.701	—	42‍–‍9	33‍–‍23
Columbus Buckeyes	69	39	.639	6½	38‍–‍16	31‍–‍23
Louisville Eclipse	68	40	.630	7½	41‍–‍14	27‍–‍26
St. Louis Browns	67	40	.626	8	38‍–‍16	29‍–‍24
Cincinnati Red Stockings	68	41	.624	8	40‍–‍16	28‍–‍25
Baltimore Orioles	63	43	.594	11½	42‍–‍13	21‍–‍30
Philadelphia Athletics	61	46	.570	14	38‍–‍16	23‍–‍30
Toledo Blue Stockings	46	58	.442	27½	28‍–‍25	18‍–‍33
Brooklyn Atlantics	40	64	.385	33½	23‍–‍26	17‍–‍38
Richmond Virginians	12	30	.286	30½	5‍–‍15	7‍–‍15
Pittsburgh Alleghenys	30	78	.278	45½	18‍–‍37	12‍–‍41
Indianapolis Hoosiers	29	78	.271	46	15‍–‍39	14‍–‍39
Washington Nationals	12	51	.190	41	10‍–‍20	2‍–‍31

=== Record vs. opponents ===
1884 American Association record Sources:
Team	BAL	BRO	CIN	COL	IND	LOU	NYM	PHA	PIT	RIC	STL	TOL	WSN
Baltimore	—	5–5	4–6	6–4	9–1	6–4–1	5–5	3–7	9–0	4–0	5–5	5–5–1	2–1
Brooklyn	5–5	—	2–8	3–7	7–3	3–6	1–9–1	3–6	4–6	3–2–1	2–7–1	4–4–2	3–1
Cincinnati	6–4	8–2	—	3–7	9–1–1	5–5	4–6–1	4–6	8–1–1	4–0	4–6	7–3	6–0
Columbus	4–6	7–3	7–3	—	8–2	5–5	4–5	5–5–1	9–1	2–2	5–5	8–1–1	5–1
Indianapolis	1–9	3–7	1–9–1	2–8	—	1–9	2–8	4–6	4–6	1–2–1	3–6–1	3–6	4–2
Louisville	4–6–1	6–3	5–5	5–5	9–1	—	3–7–1	6–3	8–2	4–1	5–5	9–1	4–1
New York	5–5	9–1–1	6–4–1	5–4	8–2	7–3–1	—	8–2	9–1	2–0	5–4–1	5–4–1	6–2
Philadelphia	7–3	6–3	6–4	5–5–1	6–4	3–6	2–8	—	8–2	2–0	3–7	6–3	7–1
Pittsburgh	0–9	6–4	1–8–1	1–9	6–4	2–8	1–9	2–8	—	1–4–1	1–9	5–5	4–1
Richmond	0–4	2–3–1	0–4	2–2	2–1–1	1–4	0–2	0–2	4–1–1	—	1–3	0–4–1	0–0
St. Louis	5–5	7–2–1	6–4	5–5	6–3–1	5–5	4–5–1	7–3	9–1	3–1	—	5–5	5–1
Toledo	5–5–1	4–4–2	3–7	1–8–1	6–3	1–9	4–5–1	3–6	5–5	4–0–1	5–5	—	5–1
Washington	1–2	1–3	0–6	1–5	2–4	1–4	2–6	1–7	1–4	0–0	1–5	1–5	—

=== Roster ===
1884 Washington Nationals
Roster
Pitchers: Bob Barr; John Hamill; Edgar Smith; Catchers: Alex Gardner; John Hanna; John Humphries	Infielders: Frank Fennelly; Buck Gladmon; Thorny Hawkes; Sam King; Frank Olin; Walter Prince; Andy Swan; Ed Yewell	Outfielders: Jack Beach; Lyman Drake; Lawrence Farley; Walt Goldsby; Jones; John Kiley; Bill Morgan; Henry Mullin; Willie Murphy; John Shoupe; Ed Trumbull; Wills	Manager: Holly Hollingshead

== Player stats ==
=== Batting ===
==== Starters by position ====
Note: Pos = Position; G = Games played; AB = At bats; H = Hits; Avg. = Batting average; HR = Home runs

Pos	Player	G	AB	H	Avg.	HR
C	John Humphries	49	193	34	.176	0
1B	Walter Prince	43	166	36	.217	1
2B	Thorny Hawkes	38	151	42	.278	0
SS	Frank Fennelly	62	257	75	.292	2
3B	Buck Gladmon	56	224	35	.156	1
OF	Bill Morgan	45	162	28	.173	0
OF	Henry Mullin	34	120	17	.142	0
OF	John Kiley	14	56	12	.214	0

==== Other batters ====
Note: G = Games played; AB = At bats; H = Hits; Avg. = Batting average; HR = Home runs

Player	G	AB	H	Avg.	HR
Ed Yewell	27	93	23	.247	0
Ed Trumbull	25	86	10	.116	0
Frank Olin	21	83	32	.386	0
John Hanna	23	76	5	.066	0
Edgar Smith	14	57	5	.088	0
Lawrence Farley	14	52	11	.212	0
Sam King	12	45	8	.178	0
Jack Beach	8	31	3	.097	0
Walt Goldsby	6	24	9	.375	0
Willie Murphy	5	21	10	.476	0
Andy Swan	5	21	3	.143	0
Jones	4	17	5	.294	0
Wills	4	15	2	.133	0
Lyman Drake	2	7	2	.286	0
Alex Gardner	1	3	0	.000	0

=== Pitching ===
==== Starting pitchers ====
Note: G = Games pitched; IP = Innings pitched; W = Wins; L = Losses; ERA = Earned run average; SO = Strikeouts

Player	G	IP	W	L	ERA	SO
Bob Barr	32	281.1	9	23	3.45	138
John Hamill	19	156.2	2	17	4.48	50
Ed Trumbull	10	84.0	1	9	4.71	43

==== Other pitchers ====
Note: G = Games pitched; IP = Innings pitched; W = Wins; L = Losses; ERA = Earned run average; SO = Strikeouts

Player	G	IP	W	L	ERA	SO
Edgar Smith	3	22.0	0	2	4.91	4
