= 1884 Indianapolis Hoosiers season =

1884 Indianapolis Hoosiers
- League: American Association
- Ballpark: Seventh Street Park, Bruce Grounds
- City: Indianapolis, Indiana
- Record: 29–78 (.271)
- League place: 12th
- Managers: Jim Gifford, Bill Watkins

The 1884 Indianapolis Hoosiers baseball team finished with a 29–78 record, 12th place in the American Association. This was the only season the team was in operation.

== Regular season ==
=== Season standings ===
American Association
Team	W	L	Pct.	GB	Home	Road
New York Metropolitans	75	32	.701	—	42‍–‍9	33‍–‍23
Columbus Buckeyes	69	39	.639	6½	38‍–‍16	31‍–‍23
Louisville Eclipse	68	40	.630	7½	41‍–‍14	27‍–‍26
St. Louis Browns	67	40	.626	8	38‍–‍16	29‍–‍24
Cincinnati Red Stockings	68	41	.624	8	40‍–‍16	28‍–‍25
Baltimore Orioles	63	43	.594	11½	42‍–‍13	21‍–‍30
Philadelphia Athletics	61	46	.570	14	38‍–‍16	23‍–‍30
Toledo Blue Stockings	46	58	.442	27½	28‍–‍25	18‍–‍33
Brooklyn Atlantics	40	64	.385	33½	23‍–‍26	17‍–‍38
Richmond Virginians	12	30	.286	30½	5‍–‍15	7‍–‍15
Pittsburgh Alleghenys	30	78	.278	45½	18‍–‍37	12‍–‍41
Indianapolis Hoosiers	29	78	.271	46	15‍–‍39	14‍–‍39
Washington Nationals	12	51	.190	41	10‍–‍20	2‍–‍31

=== Record vs. opponents ===
1884 American Association record Sources:
Team	BAL	BRO	CIN	COL	IND	LOU	NYM	PHA	PIT	RIC	STL	TOL	WSN
Baltimore	—	5–5	4–6	6–4	9–1	6–4–1	5–5	3–7	9–0	4–0	5–5	5–5–1	2–1
Brooklyn	5–5	—	2–8	3–7	7–3	3–6	1–9–1	3–6	4–6	3–2–1	2–7–1	4–4–2	3–1
Cincinnati	6–4	8–2	—	3–7	9–1–1	5–5	4–6–1	4–6	8–1–1	4–0	4–6	7–3	6–0
Columbus	4–6	7–3	7–3	—	8–2	5–5	4–5	5–5–1	9–1	2–2	5–5	8–1–1	5–1
Indianapolis	1–9	3–7	1–9–1	2–8	—	1–9	2–8	4–6	4–6	1–2–1	3–6–1	3–6	4–2
Louisville	4–6–1	6–3	5–5	5–5	9–1	—	3–7–1	6–3	8–2	4–1	5–5	9–1	4–1
New York	5–5	9–1–1	6–4–1	5–4	8–2	7–3–1	—	8–2	9–1	2–0	5–4–1	5–4–1	6–2
Philadelphia	7–3	6–3	6–4	5–5–1	6–4	3–6	2–8	—	8–2	2–0	3–7	6–3	7–1
Pittsburgh	0–9	6–4	1–8–1	1–9	6–4	2–8	1–9	2–8	—	1–4–1	1–9	5–5	4–1
Richmond	0–4	2–3–1	0–4	2–2	2–1–1	1–4	0–2	0–2	4–1–1	—	1–3	0–4–1	0–0
St. Louis	5–5	7–2–1	6–4	5–5	6–3–1	5–5	4–5–1	7–3	9–1	3–1	—	5–5	5–1
Toledo	5–5–1	4–4–2	3–7	1–8–1	6–3	1–9	4–5–1	3–6	5–5	4–0–1	5–5	—	5–1
Washington	1–2	1–3	0–6	1–5	2–4	1–4	2–6	1–7	1–4	0–0	1–5	1–5	—

=== Roster ===
1884 Indianapolis Hoosiers
Roster
Pitchers: Jake Aydelott; Bob Barr; Tommy Bond; Mac MacArthur; Al McCauley; Larry McKeon	Catchers: Marty Barrett; Harry Decker; Jim Keenan; George Mundinger; Charlie Robinson; Jim Tray; Harry Weber; Infielders: Bob Blakiston; Pat Callaghan; Chub Collins; Jim Donnelly; John Kerins; Charlie Levis; Ed Merrill; Marr Phillips; Bill Watkins	Outfielders: Bill Butler; Jerry Dorgan; Pete Fries; Jim Holdsworth; Marshall Locke; Frank W. Monroe; Gene Moriarty; Jon Morrison; John Peltz; Charlie Reising; John Sneed; Tug Thompson; Podge Weihe	Manager: Jim Gifford; Bill Watkins

== Player stats ==
=== Batting ===
==== Starters by position ====
Note: Pos = Position; G = Games played; AB = At bats; H = Hits; Avg. = Batting average; HR = Home runs

Pos	Player	G	AB	H	Avg.	HR
C	Jim Keenan	68	249	73	.293	3
1B	John Kerins	94	364	78	.214	6
2B	Ed Merrill	55	196	35	.179	0
SS	Marr Phillips	97	413	111	.269	0
3B	Pat Callaghan	61	258	67	.260	2
OF	John Peltz	106	393	86	.219	3
OF	Podge Weihe	63	256	65	.254	4
OF	Jon Morrison	44	182	48	.264	1

==== Other batters ====
Note: G = Games played; AB = At bats; H = Hits; Avg. = Batting average; HR = Home runs

Player	G	AB	H	Avg.	HR
Jerry Dorgan	34	141	42	.298	0
Chub Collins	38	138	31	.225	0
Jim Donnelly	40	134	34	.254	0
Bill Watkins	35	127	26	.205	0
John Sneed	27	102	22	.216	1
Tug Thompson	24	97	20	.206	0
Charlie Robinson	20	80	23	.288	0
Al McCauley	17	53	10	.189	0
Gene Moriarty	10	37	8	.216	0
Bill Butler	9	31	7	.226	0
Marshall Locke	7	29	7	.241	0
Jim Tray	6	21	6	.286	0
Jim Holdsworth	5	18	2	.111	0
Bob Blakiston	6	18	4	.222	0
Harry Decker	4	15	4	.267	0
Marty Barrett	5	13	1	.077	0
Charlie Levis	3	10	2	.200	0
Charlie Reising	2	8	0	.000	0
Harry Weber	3	8	0	.000	0
Frank Monroe	2	8	0	.000	0
George Mundinger	3	8	2	.250	0
Pete Fries	1	3	1	.333	0

=== Pitching ===
==== Starting pitchers ====
Note: G = Games pitched; IP = Innings pitched; W = Wins; L = Losses; ERA = Earned run average; SO = Strikeouts

Player	G	IP	W	L	ERA	SO
Larry McKeon	61	512.0	18	41	3.50	308
Bob Barr	16	132.0	3	11	4.98	69
Jake Aydelott	12	106.0	5	7	4.92	30
Al McCauley	10	76.0	2	7	5.09	34
Mac MacArthur	6	52.0	1	5	5.02	19
Tommy Bond	5	43.0	0	5	5.65	15
Gene Moriarty	2	13.2	0	2	5.27	4

==== Relief pitchers ====
Note: G = Games pitched; W = Wins; L = Losses; SV = Saves; ERA = Earned run average; SO = Strikeouts

Player	G	W	L	SV	ERA	SO
Jim Keenan	1	0	0	0	3.00	0
