= Pat Callaghan =

Pat Callaghan may refer to:

- Pat Callaghan (baseball)
- Pat Callaghan (politician)
