= Sam King (baseball) =

American baseball player (1852–1922)

- First baseman
- Born: May 17, 1852; Peabody, Massachusetts, U.S.
- Died: August 11, 1922 (aged 70); Peabody, Massachusetts, U.S.
- Batted: Unknown Threw: Left

MLB debut
- May 1, 1884, for the Washington Nationals

Last MLB appearance
- May 23, 1884, for the Washington Nationals

MLB statistics
- Batting average: .178
- Home runs: 0
- Runs batted in: 0
- Stats at Baseball Reference

Teams
- Washington Nationals (1884)

Samuel Warren King (May 17, 1852 – August 11, 1922) was an American Major League Baseball first baseman who played only one season of professional baseball, with the Washington Nationals.

== Professional career ==
=== Washington Nationals ===
King began and ended his career with the Washington Nationals of the American Association in 1884 at the age of 31. He played 12 total games and got eight hits with two doubles and one base on balls. This was his only season in professional baseball.
