= Bill Butler (outfielder) =

American baseball player (1861–1895)

- Outfielder
- Born: 1861; New Orleans, Louisiana, U.S.
- Died: May 9, 1895 (aged 33–34); New Orleans, Louisiana, U.S.
- Batted: Unknown Threw: Unknown

MLB debut
- June 29, 1884, for the Indianapolis Hoosiers

Last MLB appearance
- July 10, 1884, for the Indianapolis Hoosiers

MLB statistics
- Batting average: .226
- Home runs: 0
- Runs batted in: 0
- Stats at Baseball Reference

Teams
- Indianapolis Hoosiers (1884)

William J. Butler (1861 – May 9, 1895) was an American Major League Baseball (MLB) outfielder for the 1884 Indianapolis Hoosiers. He later played minor league ball in the Texas League from 1902 to 1906.
