= 1884 Louisville Eclipse season =

1884 Louisville Eclipse
- League: American Association
- Ballpark: Eclipse Park
- City: Louisville, Kentucky
- Record: 68–40 (.630)
- League place: 3rd
- Owners: W. L. Lyons, Zach Phelps, W. L. Jackson, John Phelps
- Managers: Joe Gerhardt, Mike Walsh

The 1884 Louisville Eclipse season was a season in American baseball. The team finished with a 68–40 record, third place in the American Association.

There has been some debate over whom the manager of this club was, with some sources listing the club's starting second baseman, Joe Gerhardt, as manager for at least part of the year, with others crediting team official Mike Walsh with either all or part of the year.

Guy Hecker started 75 games for the Eclipse in 1884 and won the American Association Pitching Triple Crown by leading the league in wins, with 52, strikeouts, with 385, and earned run average with 1.80.

== Regular season ==
=== Season standings ===
American Association
Team	W	L	Pct.	GB	Home	Road
New York Metropolitans	75	32	.701	—	42‍–‍9	33‍–‍23
Columbus Buckeyes	69	39	.639	6½	38‍–‍16	31‍–‍23
Louisville Eclipse	68	40	.630	7½	41‍–‍14	27‍–‍26
St. Louis Browns	67	40	.626	8	38‍–‍16	29‍–‍24
Cincinnati Red Stockings	68	41	.624	8	40‍–‍16	28‍–‍25
Baltimore Orioles	63	43	.594	11½	42‍–‍13	21‍–‍30
Philadelphia Athletics	61	46	.570	14	38‍–‍16	23‍–‍30
Toledo Blue Stockings	46	58	.442	27½	28‍–‍25	18‍–‍33
Brooklyn Atlantics	40	64	.385	33½	23‍–‍26	17‍–‍38
Richmond Virginians	12	30	.286	30½	5‍–‍15	7‍–‍15
Pittsburgh Alleghenys	30	78	.278	45½	18‍–‍37	12‍–‍41
Indianapolis Hoosiers	29	78	.271	46	15‍–‍39	14‍–‍39
Washington Nationals	12	51	.190	41	10‍–‍20	2‍–‍31

=== Record vs. opponents ===
1884 American Association record Sources:
Team	BAL	BRO	CIN	COL	IND	LOU	NYM	PHA	PIT	RIC	STL	TOL	WSN
Baltimore	—	5–5	4–6	6–4	9–1	6–4–1	5–5	3–7	9–0	4–0	5–5	5–5–1	2–1
Brooklyn	5–5	—	2–8	3–7	7–3	3–6	1–9–1	3–6	4–6	3–2–1	2–7–1	4–4–2	3–1
Cincinnati	6–4	8–2	—	3–7	9–1–1	5–5	4–6–1	4–6	8–1–1	4–0	4–6	7–3	6–0
Columbus	4–6	7–3	7–3	—	8–2	5–5	4–5	5–5–1	9–1	2–2	5–5	8–1–1	5–1
Indianapolis	1–9	3–7	1–9–1	2–8	—	1–9	2–8	4–6	4–6	1–2–1	3–6–1	3–6	4–2
Louisville	4–6–1	6–3	5–5	5–5	9–1	—	3–7–1	6–3	8–2	4–1	5–5	9–1	4–1
New York	5–5	9–1–1	6–4–1	5–4	8–2	7–3–1	—	8–2	9–1	2–0	5–4–1	5–4–1	6–2
Philadelphia	7–3	6–3	6–4	5–5–1	6–4	3–6	2–8	—	8–2	2–0	3–7	6–3	7–1
Pittsburgh	0–9	6–4	1–8–1	1–9	6–4	2–8	1–9	2–8	—	1–4–1	1–9	5–5	4–1
Richmond	0–4	2–3–1	0–4	2–2	2–1–1	1–4	0–2	0–2	4–1–1	—	1–3	0–4–1	0–0
St. Louis	5–5	7–2–1	6–4	5–5	6–3–1	5–5	4–5–1	7–3	9–1	3–1	—	5–5	5–1
Toledo	5–5–1	4–4–2	3–7	1–8–1	6–3	1–9	4–5–1	3–6	5–5	4–0–1	5–5	—	5–1
Washington	1–2	1–3	0–6	1–5	2–4	1–4	2–6	1–7	1–4	0–0	1–5	1–5	—

=== Roster ===
1884 Louisville Eclipse
Roster
Pitchers: Ren Deagle; Denny Driscoll; Guy Hecker; Catchers: Bill Hunter; Dan Sullivan; Ed Whiting	Infielders: Wally Andrews; Pete Browning; Joe Gerhardt; Juice Latham; Tom McLaughlin; Phil Reccius	Outfielders: Monk Cline; Buttercup Dickerson; Leech Maskrey; Len Stockwell; Jimmy Wolf	Manager: Joe Gerhardt; Mike Walsh

== Player stats ==
=== Batting ===
==== Starters by position ====
Note: Pos = Position; G = Games played; AB = At bats; H = Hits; Avg. = Batting average; HR = Home runs; RBI = Runs batted in

Pos	Player	G	AB	H	Avg.	HR	RBI
C	Dan Sullivan	63	247	59	.239	0	26
1B	Jumbo Latham	77	308	52	.169	0	23
2B	Joe Gerhardt	106	404	89	.220	0	40
3B	Pete Browning	103	447	150	.336	4	47
SS	Tom McLaughlin	98	335	67	.200	0	21
OF	Jimmy Wolf	110	486	146	.300	3	73
OF	Leech Maskrey	105	412	103	.250	0	36
OF	Monk Cline	94	396	115	.290	2	39

==== Other batters ====
Note: G = Games played; AB = At bats; H = Hits; Avg. = Batting average; HR = Home runs; RBI = Runs batted in

Player	G	AB	H	Avg.	HR	RBI
Phil Reccius	73	263	63	.240	3	21
Ed Whiting	42	157	35	.223	0	18
Wally Andrews	14	49	10	.204	0	8
Buttercup Dickerson	8	28	4	.143	1	-
Len Stockwell	2	9	1	.111	0	-
Bill Hunter	2	7	1	.143	0	-

=== Pitching ===
==== Starting pitchers ====
Note: G = Games pitched; IP = Innings pitched; W = Wins; L = Losses; ERA = Earned run average; SO = Strikeouts

Player	G	IP	W	L	ERA	SO
Guy Hecker	75	670.2	52	20	1.80	385
Denny Driscoll	13	102.0	6	6	3.44	16
Ren Deagle	12	87.1	4	6	2.58	23
Pete Browning	1	0.1	0	1	54.00	0

==== Other pitchers ====
Note: G = Games pitched; IP = Innings pitched; W = Wins; L = Losses; ERA = Earned run average; SO = Strikeouts

Player	G	IP	W	L	ERA	SO
Phil Reccius	18	129.1	6	7	2.71	46
