= Mike Walsh (umpire) =

Irish-American baseball manager and umpire

- Manager/Umpire
- Born: April 29, 1850; Ireland
- Died: February 2, 1929 (aged 78); Louisville, Kentucky, U.S.
- Batted: Unknown Threw: Unknown

MLB debut
- May 1, 1884, for the Louisville Colonels

Last MLB appearance
- October 15, 1884, for the Louisville Colonels

MLB statistics
- Games Managed: 110
- Win–loss record: 68–40
- Managerial winning %: .630

Teams
- Louisville Colonels (1884)

Career highlights and awards
- Umpired in 11 Major League seasons.; Called three no-hitters.

Michael John Walsh (April 29, 1850 – February 2, 1929) was an Irish-American umpire and manager in Major League Baseball who umpired 304 games from 1875 to 1888 in three different leagues: the National Association, the National League, and the American Association.

== Umpiring career ==
As was customary in his era, Walsh was the sole umpire in every game he called. After debuting in the National Association in September 1875, he umpired in the NL's first season in 1876, with only Charles F. Daniels officiating more games, but he departed at the end of July before returning to work two games at the end of the season, then several games in 1878 and 1879 and much of the second half of the 1880 season. He moved to the American Association for the 1882–1883 campaigns when that league was established, and after one season as a manager he resumed his officiating work in 1885 and 1886; he also called a single game each in the 1887 and 1888 seasons. Among the highlights of his 11-year career were his games officiating three no-hitters, the first coming on September 11, 1882, by Tony Mullane. The second came a mere eight days later on September 19 when Guy Hecker tossed one; these were the first two no-hitters in the American Association, then in its first season. The third no-hitter occurred on July 24, 1886, when Adonis Terry threw the first of his two career no-hitters.

Mullane's no-hitter for the Louisville Eclipse was nearly derailed in the ninth inning, however; with two out, Pop Snyder of the Cincinnati Red Stockings lofted a fly ball to center field, but John Reccius mishandled what should have been an easy catch. Snyder, now on first base, complained to Walsh that Mullane was bringing his arm above his shoulder when pitching, which was not permitted at the time. Walsh overruled the complaint, however, and Mullane got Dan "Ecky" Stearns to ground out to end the game. The game was also notable for another incident in the eighth inning; the American Association's rules at that time permitted a substitute to run for a batter who was injured, as long as both teams' captains consented, with the substitute standing behind home plate and prepared to run if the hitter made contact. Pete Browning, who had a pulled leg muscle and had not reached base in the game, batted what appeared to be a single into right field, but forgot the presence of the substitute (Hecker) and ran to first base as Hecker stopped in surprise. Snyder, the Cincinnati catcher, had pitcher Will White throw the ball to Stearns at first base, and Walsh immediately signaled an out, ruling that Hecker was the correct runner and had not reached first. The lost hit eventually resulted in Browning's final career batting average being .341 rather than .342; the higher average would have tied him with Dan Brouthers for the highest mark among players of the era before 1893, when the pitching distance was extended from 50 to 60'6".

Walsh also had his share of lowlights in the rough-and-tumble world of umpiring in the late 19th century. On July 13, 1882, during the 4th inning of the game between the Cincinnati Red Stockings and the Baltimore Orioles‚ angry spectators encircled him after he made a controversial call, and he was forced to take refuge in the Baltimore clubhouse for 15 minutes. On September 14, he was assaulted by some young fans after a game in Brooklyn‚ but he escaped serious injury.

== Managerial career ==
Walsh is currently credited with a managerial career which lasted one season, when he took the reins of the Louisville Eclipse for the 1884 season. He led the team to a 68–40 record and finished 3rd in the American Association standings. Although current reference works generally list him as the manager of the 1884 club, there has been some dispute as to the historical accuracy of that attribution; in 1997, historian David Nemec wrote: "At one time Macmillan listed Joe Gerhardt as Louisville's manager for part of the 1883 season and the first half of the 1884 season. Now both Macmillan and Total Baseball credit Gerhardt with managing Louisville during all of the 1883 season, but say Mike Walsh ran the club in 1884. That would be news to Pete Browning, Guy Hecker and everyone else from those days still keeping up on the game. Gerhardt ran the team on the field in 1884 until August, when he was replaced as captain. The local papers all made a big to-do of his being canned. Perhaps Walsh, a club official and ex-umpire, was the one who decided to axe Gerhardt and take on the job himself, but until it was a fait accompli the team was under Gerhardt's wing. Macmillan had it right originally."

== Post-career ==
Walsh died in Louisville, Kentucky at the age of 78, and is interred in that city's St. Louis Cemetery.

Preceded by Joe Gerhardt	Louisville Eclipse Managers; 1884	Succeeded by Jim Hart
