= 1884 Pittsburgh Alleghenys season =

1884 Pittsburgh Alleghenys
- League: American Association
- Ballpark: Recreation Park
- City: Allegheny, Pennsylvania
- Record: 30–78 (.278)
- League place: 11th
- Owner: Denny McKnight
- Managers: Joe Battin, Denny McKnight, Bob Ferguson, George Creamer, Horace Phillips

The 1884 Pittsburgh Alleghenys season was the third season of the Pittsburgh Alleghenys franchise. The Alleghenys finished 11th in the American Association with a record of 30–78.

== Game log ==
1884 Game Log
May: 8–15 (Home: 6–8; Away: 2–7)

| # | Date | Opponent | Score | Record |
|---|---|---|---|---|
| 1 | Thursday, May 1 | Philadelphia Athletics | 2–9 | 0–1 |
| 2 | Friday, May 2 | Philadelphia Athletics | 2–11 | 0–2 |
| 3 | Saturday, May 3 | Philadelphia Athletics | 9–8 | 1–2 |
| 4 | Monday, May 5 | New York Metropolitans | 1–6 | 1–3 |
| 5 | Wednesday, May 7 | New York Metropolitans | 1–8 | 1–4 |
| 6 | Thursday, May 8 | New York Metropolitans | 1–8 | 1–5 |
| 7 | Friday, May 9 | Brooklyn Atlantics | 8–2 | 2–5 |
| 8 | Saturday, May 10 | Brooklyn Atlantics | 16–6 | 3–5 |
| 9 | Monday, May 12 | Brooklyn Atlantics | 9–6 | 4–5 |
| 10 | Tuesday, May 13 | @ New York Metropolitans | 4–13 | 4–6 |
| 11 | Wednesday, May 14 | @ New York Metropolitans | 2–4 | 4–7 |
| 12 | Thursday, May 15 | @ New York Metropolitans | 0–8 | 4–8 |
| 13 | Saturday, May 17 | @ Brooklyn Atlantics | 4–3 | 5–8 |
| 14 | Monday, May 19 | @ Brooklyn Atlantics | 6–11 | 5–9 |
| 15 | Tuesday, May 20 | @ Brooklyn Atlantics | 10–1 | 6–9 |
| 16 | Thursday, May 22 | @ Philadelphia Athletics | 1–8 | 6–10 |
| 17 | Friday, May 23 | @ Philadelphia Athletics | 4–9 | 6–11 |
| 18 | Saturday, May 24 | @ Philadelphia Athletics | 1–10 | 6–12 |
| 19 | Wednesday, May 28 | Columbus Buckeyes | 0–5 | 6–13 |
| 20 | Thursday, May 29 | Columbus Buckeyes | 0–5 | 6–14 |
| 21 | Friday, May 30 | Toledo Blue Stockings | 8–6 | 7–14 |
| 22 | Friday, May 30 | Toledo Blue Stockings | 1–2 | 7–15 |
| 23 | Saturday, May 31 | Toledo Blue Stockings | 5–3 | 8–15 |

June: 4–16 (Home: 3–10; Away: 1–6)

| # | Date | Opponent | Score | Record |
|---|---|---|---|---|
| 24 | Tuesday, Jun 3 | Indianapolis Hoosiers | 2–3 | 8–16 |
| 25 | Wednesday, Jun 4 | Indianapolis Hoosiers | 11–6 | 9–16 |
| 26 | Thursday, Jun 5 | Indianapolis Hoosiers | 10–11 | 9–17 |
| 27 | Saturday, Jun 7 | St. Louisville Eclipseis Browns | 5–13 | 9–18 |
| 28 | Monday, Jun 9 | St. Louisville Eclipseis Browns | 3–9 | 9–19 |
| 29 | Wednesday, Jun 11 | St. Louisville Eclipseis Browns | 0–3 | 9–20 |
| 30 | Thursday, Jun 12 | Cincinnati Red Stockings | 5–7 | 9–21 |
| 31 | Friday, Jun 13 | Cincinnati Red Stockings | 2–0 | 10–21 |
| 32 | Monday, Jun 16 | Louisville Eclipse | 3–7 | 10–22 |
| 33 | Tuesday, Jun 17 | Louisville Eclipse | 6–7 | 10–23 |
| 34 | Wednesday, Jun 18 | Louisville Eclipse | 6–2 | 11–23 |
| 35 | Thursday, Jun 19 | Cincinnati Red Stockings | 1–7 | 11–24 |
| 36 | Friday, Jun 20 | Columbus Buckeyes | 3–6 | 11–25 |
| 37 | Saturday, Jun 21 | @ Cincinnati Red Stockings | 0–5 | 11–26 |
| 38 | Sunday, Jun 22 | @ Cincinnati Red Stockings | 2–4 | 11–27 |
| 39 | Tuesday, Jun 24 | @ Cincinnati Red Stockings | 0–12 | 11–28 |
| 40 | Thursday, Jun 26 | @ Columbus Buckeyes | 3–6 | 11–29 |
| 41 | Friday, Jun 27 | @ Columbus Buckeyes | 1–4 | 11–30 |
| 42 | Saturday, Jun 28 | @ Columbus Buckeyes | 3–4 | 11–31 |
| 43 | Monday, Jun 30 | @ Toledo Blue Stockings | 4–3 | 12–31 |

July: 8–13 (Home: 3–1; Away: 5–12)

| # | Date | Opponent | Score | Record |
|---|---|---|---|---|
| 44 | Tuesday, Jul 1 | @ Toledo Blue Stockings | 3–5 | 12–32 |
| 45 | Wednesday, Jul 2 | @ Toledo Blue Stockings | 8–7 | 13–32 |
| 46 | Friday, Jul 4 | @ Indianapolis Hoosiers | 4–15 | 13–33 |
| 47 | Friday, Jul 4 | @ Indianapolis Hoosiers | 3–1 | 14–33 |
| 48 | Saturday, Jul 5 | @ Indianapolis Hoosiers | 3–12 | 14–34 |
| 49 | Sunday, Jul 6 | @ St. Louisville Eclipseis Browns | 6–12 | 14–35 |
| 50 | Tuesday, Jul 8 | @ St. Louisville Eclipseis Browns | 1–7 | 14–36 |
| 51 | Thursday, Jul 10 | @ St. Louisville Eclipseis Browns | 2–11 | 14–37 |
| 52 | Saturday, Jul 12 | @ Louisville Eclipse | 1–4 | 14–38 |
| 53 | Sunday, Jul 13 | @ Louisville Eclipse | 5–4 | 15–38 |
| 54 | Monday, Jul 14 | @ Louisville Eclipse | 0–6 | 15–39 |
| 55 | Thursday, Jul 17 | Washington Nationals | 3–2 | 16–39 |
| 56 | Friday, Jul 18 | Washington Nationals | 4–2 | 17–39 |
| 57 | Saturday, Jul 19 | Washington Nationals | 7–1 | 18–39 |
| 58 | Monday, Jul 21 | @ Washington Nationals | 3–12 | 18–40 |
| 59 | Tuesday, Jul 22 | @ Washington Nationals | 9–8 | 19–40 |
| 60 | Wednesday, Jul 23 | @ Brooklyn Atlantics | 4–10 | 19–41 |
| 61 | Thursday, Jul 24 | @ Brooklyn Atlantics | 6–2 | 20–41 |
| 62 | Saturday, Jul 26 | @ New York Metropolitans | 3–9 | 20–42 |
| 63 | Monday, Jul 28 | @ New York Metropolitans | 1–9 | 20–43 |
| 64 | Wednesday, Jul 30 | Baltimore Orioles | 2–9 | 20–44 |

August: 3–14 (Home: 2–6; Away: 1–8)

| # | Date | Opponent | Score | Record |
|---|---|---|---|---|
| 65 | Friday, Aug 1 | Philadelphia Athletics | 4–3 | 21–44 |
| 66 | Saturday, Aug 2 | Philadelphia Athletics | 2–7 | 21–45 |
| 67 | Monday, Aug 4 | Brooklyn Atlantics | 2–4 | 21–46 |
| 68 | Wednesday, Aug 6 | Brooklyn Atlantics | 0–6 | 21–47 |
| 69 | Thursday, Aug 7 | @ Philadelphia Athletics | 1–7 | 21–48 |
| 70 | Saturday, Aug 9 | @ Philadelphia Athletics | 2–13 | 21–49 |
| 71 | Monday, Aug 11 | @ Baltimore Orioles | 4–10 | 21–50 |
| 72 | Tuesday, Aug 12 | @ Baltimore Orioles | 3–4 | 21–51 |
| 73 | Wednesday, Aug 13 | Baltimore Orioles | 0–8 | 21–52 |
| 74 | Thursday, Aug 14 | Baltimore Orioles | 4–14 | 21–53 |
| 75 | Saturday, Aug 16 | New York Metropolitans | 0–6 | 21–54 |
| 76 | Monday, Aug 18 | New York Metropolitans | 1–0 | 22–54 |
| 77 | Friday, Aug 22 | @ Baltimore Orioles | 6–8 | 22–55 |
| 78 | Saturday, Aug 23 | @ Baltimore Orioles | 3–7 | 22–56 |
| 79 | Monday, Aug 25 | @ Baltimore Orioles | 3–9 | 22–57 |
| 80 | Tuesday, Aug 26 | @ Richmond Virginians | 4–4 | 22–57 |
| 81 | Wednesday, Aug 27 | @ Richmond Virginians | 5–7 | 22–58 |
| 82 | Thursday, Aug 28 | @ Richmond Virginians | 5–0 | 23–58 |

September: 6–12 (Home: 3–4; Away: 3–8)

| # | Date | Opponent | Score | Record |
|---|---|---|---|---|
| 83 | Monday, Sep 1 | Richmond Virginians | 5–10 | 23–59 |
| 84 | Tuesday, Sep 2 | Richmond Virginians | 1–2 | 23–60 |
| 85 | Wednesday, Sep 3 | Richmond Virginians | 4–8 | 23–61 |
| 86 | Thursday, Sep 4 | @ Toledo Blue Stockings | 2–4 | 23–62 |
| 87 | Saturday, Sep 6 | @ Toledo Blue Stockings | 10–3 | 24–62 |
| 88 | Sunday, Sep 7 | @ Columbus Buckeyes | 7–3 | 25–62 |
| 89 | Wednesday, Sep 10 | @ Columbus Buckeyes | 2–10 | 25–63 |
| 90 | Thursday, Sep 11 | @ Cincinnati Red Stockings | 1–11 | 25–64 |
| 91 | Saturday, Sep 13 | @ Cincinnati Red Stockings | 6–11 | 25–65 |
| 92 | Tuesday, Sep 16 | @ Louisville Eclipse | 1–6 | 25–66 |
| 93 | Wednesday, Sep 17 | @ Louisville Eclipse | 1–4 | 25–67 |
| 94 | Thursday, Sep 18 | @ St. Louisville Eclipseis Browns | 4–6 | 25–68 |
| 95 | Saturday, Sep 20 | @ St. Louisville Eclipseis Browns | 1–4 | 25–69 |
| 96 | Sunday, Sep 21 | @ Indianapolis Hoosiers | 4–2 | 26–69 |
| 97 | Wednesday, Sep 24 | Baltimore Orioles | 6–8 | 26–70 |
| 98 | Thursday, Sep 25 | Indianapolis Hoosiers | 15–4 | 27–70 |
| 99 | Saturday, Sep 27 | Indianapolis Hoosiers | 8–4 | 28–70 |
| 100 | Monday, Sep 29 | Indianapolis Hoosiers | 2–0 | 29–70 |

October: 1–8 (Home: 1–8; Away: 0–0)

| # | Date | Opponent | Score | Record |
|---|---|---|---|---|
| 101 | Wednesday, Oct 1 | St. Louisville Eclipseis Browns | 2–1 | 30–70 |
| 102 | Thursday, Oct 2 | St. Louisville Eclipseis Browns | 5–10 | 30–71 |
| 103 | Friday, Oct 3 | Columbus Buckeyes | 3–14 | 30–72 |
| 104 | Saturday, Oct 4 | Columbus Buckeyes | 4–15 | 30–73 |
| 105 | Monday, Oct 6 | Cincinnati Red Stockings | 8–8 | 30–73 |
| 106 | Tuesday, Oct 7 | Cincinnati Red Stockings | 3–8 | 30–74 |
| 107 | Thursday, Oct 9 | Toledo Blue Stockings | 3–9 | 30–75 |
| 108 | Saturday, Oct 11 | Toledo Blue Stockings | 0–2 | 30–76 |
| 109 | Tuesday, Oct 14 | Louisville Eclipse | 3–10 | 30–77 |
| 110 | Wednesday, Oct 15 | Louisville Eclipse | 4–9 | 30–78 |

Legend: = Win = Loss = Tie

== Season standings ==
American Association
| Team | W | L | Pct. | GB | Home | Road |
|---|---|---|---|---|---|---|
| New York Metropolitans | 75 | 32 | .701 | — | 42‍–‍9 | 33‍–‍23 |
| Columbus Buckeyes | 69 | 39 | .639 | 6½ | 38‍–‍16 | 31‍–‍23 |
| Louisville Eclipse | 68 | 40 | .630 | 7½ | 41‍–‍14 | 27‍–‍26 |
| St. Louis Browns | 67 | 40 | .626 | 8 | 38‍–‍16 | 29‍–‍24 |
| Cincinnati Red Stockings | 68 | 41 | .624 | 8 | 40‍–‍16 | 28‍–‍25 |
| Baltimore Orioles | 63 | 43 | .594 | 11½ | 42‍–‍13 | 21‍–‍30 |
| Philadelphia Athletics | 61 | 46 | .570 | 14 | 38‍–‍16 | 23‍–‍30 |
| Toledo Blue Stockings | 46 | 58 | .442 | 27½ | 28‍–‍25 | 18‍–‍33 |
| Brooklyn Atlantics | 40 | 64 | .385 | 33½ | 23‍–‍26 | 17‍–‍38 |
| Richmond Virginians | 12 | 30 | .286 | 30½ | 5‍–‍15 | 7‍–‍15 |
| Pittsburgh Alleghenys | 30 | 78 | .278 | 45½ | 18‍–‍37 | 12‍–‍41 |
| Indianapolis Hoosiers | 29 | 78 | .271 | 46 | 15‍–‍39 | 14‍–‍39 |
| Washington Nationals | 12 | 51 | .190 | 41 | 10‍–‍20 | 2‍–‍31 |

=== Record vs. opponents ===
1884 American Association record Sources:
| Team | BAL | BRO | CIN | COL | IND | LOU | NYM | PHA | PIT | RIC | STL | TOL | WSN |
|---|---|---|---|---|---|---|---|---|---|---|---|---|---|
| Baltimore | — | 5–5 | 4–6 | 6–4 | 9–1 | 6–4–1 | 5–5 | 3–7 | 9–0 | 4–0 | 5–5 | 5–5–1 | 2–1 |
| Brooklyn | 5–5 | — | 2–8 | 3–7 | 7–3 | 3–6 | 1–9–1 | 3–6 | 4–6 | 3–2–1 | 2–7–1 | 4–4–2 | 3–1 |
| Cincinnati | 6–4 | 8–2 | — | 3–7 | 9–1–1 | 5–5 | 4–6–1 | 4–6 | 8–1–1 | 4–0 | 4–6 | 7–3 | 6–0 |
| Columbus | 4–6 | 7–3 | 7–3 | — | 8–2 | 5–5 | 4–5 | 5–5–1 | 9–1 | 2–2 | 5–5 | 8–1–1 | 5–1 |
| Indianapolis | 1–9 | 3–7 | 1–9–1 | 2–8 | — | 1–9 | 2–8 | 4–6 | 4–6 | 1–2–1 | 3–6–1 | 3–6 | 4–2 |
| Louisville | 4–6–1 | 6–3 | 5–5 | 5–5 | 9–1 | — | 3–7–1 | 6–3 | 8–2 | 4–1 | 5–5 | 9–1 | 4–1 |
| New York | 5–5 | 9–1–1 | 6–4–1 | 5–4 | 8–2 | 7–3–1 | — | 8–2 | 9–1 | 2–0 | 5–4–1 | 5–4–1 | 6–2 |
| Philadelphia | 7–3 | 6–3 | 6–4 | 5–5–1 | 6–4 | 3–6 | 2–8 | — | 8–2 | 2–0 | 3–7 | 6–3 | 7–1 |
| Pittsburgh | 0–9 | 6–4 | 1–8–1 | 1–9 | 6–4 | 2–8 | 1–9 | 2–8 | — | 1–4–1 | 1–9 | 5–5 | 4–1 |
| Richmond | 0–4 | 2–3–1 | 0–4 | 2–2 | 2–1–1 | 1–4 | 0–2 | 0–2 | 4–1–1 | — | 1–3 | 0–4–1 | 0–0 |
| St. Louis | 5–5 | 7–2–1 | 6–4 | 5–5 | 6–3–1 | 5–5 | 4–5–1 | 7–3 | 9–1 | 3–1 | — | 5–5 | 5–1 |
| Toledo | 5–5–1 | 4–4–2 | 3–7 | 1–8–1 | 6–3 | 1–9 | 4–5–1 | 3–6 | 5–5 | 4–0–1 | 5–5 | — | 5–1 |
| Washington | 1–2 | 1–3 | 0–6 | 1–5 | 2–4 | 1–4 | 2–6 | 1–7 | 1–4 | 0–0 | 1–5 | 1–5 | — |

== Roster ==
1884 Pittsburgh Alleghenys roster
| Pitchers: Frank Beck; John Fox; Jack Gorman; Jack Neagle; Bill Nelson; Phenomenal Smith; Fleury Sullivan; Catchers: Billy Colgan; Jackie Hayes; Frank Smith | Infielders: Gus Alberts; Joe Battin; George Creamer; Jimmy Dee; Jay Faatz; Tom Forster; Jim Gray; Charlie Hautz; Jimmy Knowles; Jim McDonald; John Peters; Joe Quest; Bill White; Art Whitney | Outfielders: Conny Doyle; Charlie Eden; Bob Ferguson; Chuck Lauer; Mike Mansell; Doggie Miller; Billy Reid; Ed Swartwood; Live Oak Taylor; Jimmy Woulfe | Managers: Joe Battin; George Creamer; Denny McKnight; Bob Ferguson; Horace Phillips |

== Player stats ==
Batters

Note: G = Games played; AB = At bats; H = Hits; Avg. = Batting average; HR = Home runs; RBI = Runs batted in

Regular Season
| Player | G | AB | H | Avg. | HR | RBI |
|---|---|---|---|---|---|---|
| Jim Gray | 1 | 2 | 1 | 0.500 | 0 | 0 |
| Frank Beck | 3 | 12 | 4 | 0.333 | 0 | 0 |
| Art Whitney | 23 | 94 | 28 | 0.298 | 0 | 0 |
| Conny Doyle | 15 | 58 | 17 | 0.293 | 0 | 0 |
| Ed Swartwood | 102 | 399 | 115 | 0.288 | 0 | 0 |
| Charlie Eden | 32 | 122 | 33 | 0.270 | 1 | 0 |
| Frank Smith | 10 | 36 | 9 | 0.250 | 0 | 0 |
| Billy Reid | 19 | 70 | 17 | 0.243 | 0 | 0 |
| Jay Faatz | 29 | 112 | 27 | 0.241 | 0 | 0 |
| John Fox | 8 | 25 | 6 | 0.240 | 0 | 0 |
| Jimmy Knowles | 46 | 182 | 42 | 0.231 | 0 | 0 |
| Bill White | 74 | 291 | 66 | 0.227 | 0 | 0 |
| Jackie Hayes | 33 | 124 | 28 | 0.226 | 0 | 0 |
| Doggie Miller | 89 | 347 | 78 | 0.225 | 0 | 0 |
| Tom Forster | 35 | 126 | 28 | 0.222 | 0 | 0 |
| Live Oak Taylor | 41 | 152 | 32 | 0.211 | 0 | 0 |
| Joe Quest | 12 | 43 | 9 | 0.209 | 0 | 0 |
| Charlie Hautz | 7 | 24 | 5 | 0.208 | 0 | 0 |
| Gus Alberts | 2 | 5 | 1 | 0.200 | 0 | 0 |
| George Creamer | 98 | 339 | 62 | 0.183 | 0 | 0 |
| Joe Battin | 43 | 158 | 28 | 0.177 | 0 | 0 |
| Bill Nelson | 3 | 12 | 2 | 0.167 | 0 | 0 |
| Jim McDonald | 38 | 145 | 23 | 0.159 | 0 | 0 |
| Billy Colgan | 48 | 161 | 25 | 0.155 | 0 | 0 |
| Fleury Sullivan | 54 | 189 | 29 | 0.153 | 0 | 0 |
| Jack Neagle | 43 | 148 | 22 | 0.149 | 0 | 0 |
| Jack Gorman | 8 | 27 | 4 | 0.148 | 0 | 0 |
| Bob Ferguson | 10 | 41 | 6 | 0.146 | 0 | 0 |
| Mike Mansell | 27 | 100 | 14 | 0.140 | 1 | 0 |
| Jimmy Dee | 12 | 40 | 5 | 0.125 | 0 | 0 |
| Chuck Lauer | 13 | 44 | 5 | 0.114 | 0 | 0 |
| Jimmy Woulfe | 15 | 53 | 6 | 0.113 | 0 | 1 |
| John Peters | 1 | 4 | 0 | 0.000 | 0 | 0 |
| Phenomenal Smith | 1 | 4 | 0 | 0.000 | 0 | 0 |

Pitchers

Note: G = Games pitched; IP = Innings pitched; W = Wins; L = Losses; ERA = Earned run average; SO = Strikeouts

Regular Season
| Player | G | IP | W | L | ERA | SO |
|---|---|---|---|---|---|---|
| Jack Neagle | 38 | 326 | 11 | 26 | 3.73 | 85 |
| Fleury Sullivan | 51 | 441 | 16 | 35 | 4.20 | 189 |
| Bill Nelson | 3 | 26 | 1 | 2 | 4.50 | 6 |
| Jack Gorman | 3 | 25 | 1 | 2 | 4.68 | 10 |
| John Fox | 7 | 59 | 1 | 6 | 5.64 | 22 |
| Charlie Eden | 2 | 12 | 0 | 1 | 6.00 | 3 |
| Frank Beck | 3 | 25 | 0 | 3 | 6.12 | 11 |
| Chuck Lauer | 3 | 19 | 0 | 2 | 7.58 | 8 |
| Phenomenal Smith | 1 | 8 | 0 | 1 | 9.00 | 4 |
| Ed Swartwood | 1 | 2 1/3 | 0 | 0 | 11.57 | 0 |
