= Al McCauley =

American baseball player (1863–1917)

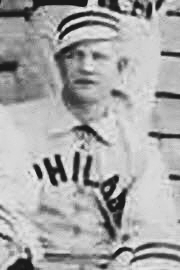
- First baseman / Pitcher
- Born: March 4, 1863; Indianapolis, Indiana, U.S.
- Died: August 24, 1917 (aged 54); Indianapolis, Indiana, U.S.
- Batted: left Threw: left

MLB debut
- June 21, 1884, for the Indianapolis Hoosiers

Last MLB appearance
- October 6, 1891, for the Washington Statesmen

MLB statistics
- Batting average: .251
- Home runs: 2
- Runs batted in: 78
- Win–loss record: 2-7
- Strikeouts: 34
- Earned run average: 5.09
- Stats at Baseball Reference

Teams
- Indianapolis Hoosiers (1884); Philadelphia Phillies (1890); Washington Statesmen (1891)

Allen A. McCauley (March 4, 1863 – August 24, 1917) was an American first baseman and pitcher in Major League Baseball for three seasons, 1884, 1890 and 1891. He played in the minor leagues between 1884 and 1890 and afterwards from 1892 to 1897, primarily in the Western League.
