= 1884 Cincinnati Red Stockings season =

Major League Baseball season

1884 Cincinnati Red Stockings
- League: American Association
- Ballpark: American Park
- City: Cincinnati
- Record: 68–41 (.624)
- League place: 5th
- Owner: Aaron S. Stern
- Managers: Pop Snyder, Will White

The 1884 Cincinnati Red Stockings season was a season in American baseball. The team finished fifth in the American Association with a record of 68–41, 8 games behind the New York Metropolitans.

== Regular season ==
The Red Stockings were looking to return to their 1882 form, when they won the American Association pennant before falling to third place in 1883. The club named pitcher Will White the player-manager for the 1884 season, taking over for catcher Pop Snyder. Cincinnati was relatively quiet during the off-season, although they did sign Tom Mansell, who had split the previous season between the Detroit Wolverines of the National League, and the St. Louis Browns of the AA, hitting .305 with 34 RBI and 45 runs between those two teams. The club also moved into American Park for the 1884 season.

John Reilly was the offensive force on the team, hitting .339 with eleven home runs and 91 RBI, all club highs. Charley Jones hit .314 with seven home runs and 71 RBI, along with a team high 117 runs. On the mound, White led the way with a 34–18 record and a 3.32 ERA in 52 starts.

=== Season summary ===
Cincinnati got off to a slow start, as they lost their first game in their new ballpark, 10–9 to the Columbus Buckeyes, and they had a record of 4–5 in their first nine games, before reeling off four wins in a row to stay above the .500 level for the rest of the season. The Red Stockings got red hot, as they eventually had a 28–14 record, only one game out of first place. In a three-game series against the Washington Nationals, the Red Stockings outscored their opposition 48–6. Cincinnati started to fade as the season continued on, and with their record at 44–27 changed managers, bringing Pop Snyder back as player-manager. Cincinnati continued to slump, falling to 10½ games out of first place with a 52–35 record, but then won ten games in a row to climb back to within 4½ games. It was too little too late though, as Cincinnati finished the season with a 68–41 record, good enough for fifth place, eight games behind the Metropolitans.

=== Season standings ===
American Association
Team	W	L	Pct.	GB	Home	Road
New York Metropolitans	75	32	.701	—	42‍–‍9	33‍–‍23
Columbus Buckeyes	69	39	.639	6½	38‍–‍16	31‍–‍23
Louisville Eclipse	68	40	.630	7½	41‍–‍14	27‍–‍26
St. Louis Browns	67	40	.626	8	38‍–‍16	29‍–‍24
Cincinnati Red Stockings	68	41	.624	8	40‍–‍16	28‍–‍25
Baltimore Orioles	63	43	.594	11½	42‍–‍13	21‍–‍30
Philadelphia Athletics	61	46	.570	14	38‍–‍16	23‍–‍30
Toledo Blue Stockings	46	58	.442	27½	28‍–‍25	18‍–‍33
Brooklyn Atlantics	40	64	.385	33½	23‍–‍26	17‍–‍38
Richmond Virginians	12	30	.286	30½	5‍–‍15	7‍–‍15
Pittsburgh Alleghenys	30	78	.278	45½	18‍–‍37	12‍–‍41
Indianapolis Hoosiers	29	78	.271	46	15‍–‍39	14‍–‍39
Washington Nationals	12	51	.190	41	10‍–‍20	2‍–‍31

=== Record vs. opponents ===
1884 American Association record Sources:
Team	BAL	BRO	CIN	COL	IND	LOU	NYM	PHA	PIT	RIC	STL	TOL	WSN
Baltimore	—	5–5	4–6	6–4	9–1	6–4–1	5–5	3–7	9–0	4–0	5–5	5–5–1	2–1
Brooklyn	5–5	—	2–8	3–7	7–3	3–6	1–9–1	3–6	4–6	3–2–1	2–7–1	4–4–2	3–1
Cincinnati	6–4	8–2	—	3–7	9–1–1	5–5	4–6–1	4–6	8–1–1	4–0	4–6	7–3	6–0
Columbus	4–6	7–3	7–3	—	8–2	5–5	4–5	5–5–1	9–1	2–2	5–5	8–1–1	5–1
Indianapolis	1–9	3–7	1–9–1	2–8	—	1–9	2–8	4–6	4–6	1–2–1	3–6–1	3–6	4–2
Louisville	4–6–1	6–3	5–5	5–5	9–1	—	3–7–1	6–3	8–2	4–1	5–5	9–1	4–1
New York	5–5	9–1–1	6–4–1	5–4	8–2	7–3–1	—	8–2	9–1	2–0	5–4–1	5–4–1	6–2
Philadelphia	7–3	6–3	6–4	5–5–1	6–4	3–6	2–8	—	8–2	2–0	3–7	6–3	7–1
Pittsburgh	0–9	6–4	1–8–1	1–9	6–4	2–8	1–9	2–8	—	1–4–1	1–9	5–5	4–1
Richmond	0–4	2–3–1	0–4	2–2	2–1–1	1–4	0–2	0–2	4–1–1	—	1–3	0–4–1	0–0
St. Louis	5–5	7–2–1	6–4	5–5	6–3–1	5–5	4–5–1	7–3	9–1	3–1	—	5–5	5–1
Toledo	5–5–1	4–4–2	3–7	1–8–1	6–3	1–9	4–5–1	3–6	5–5	4–0–1	5–5	—	5–1
Washington	1–2	1–3	0–6	1–5	2–4	1–4	2–6	1–7	1–4	0–0	1–5	1–5	—

=== Game log ===
Legend
Red Stockings Win	Red Stockings Loss	Game Tied/Postponed

1884 Game Log: 68–41 (Home: 40–16; Away: 28–25)
May: 12–8 (Home: 4–2; Away: 8–6)

#	Date	Opponent	Score	Stadium	Attendance	Record	Streak
1	May 1	Buckeyes	9–10	American Park	N/A	0–1	L1
2	May 2	Buckeyes	4–3	American Park	N/A	1–1	W1
3	May 3	Buckeyes	4–6	American Park	N/A	1–2	L1
–	May 4	Hoosiers	Postponed (rain); Makeup: May 8				
4	May 6	Hoosiers	0–0	American Park	N/A	1–2	L1
–	May 7	Hoosiers	Postponed (rain); Makeup: August 27 as part of doubleheader				
5	May 8	Hoosiers	8–3	American Park	N/A	2–2	W1
6	May 9	Blue Stockings	9–1	American Park	N/A	3–2	W2
7	May 10	Blue Stockings	11–1	American Park	N/A	4–2	W3
8	May 11	Blue Stockings	2–3	American Park	N/A	4–3	L1
–	May 13	@ Buckeyes	Postponed (rain); Makeup: May 16				
9	May 14	@ Buckeyes	2–8	Recreation Park	N/A	4–4	L2
10	May 15	@ Buckeyes	3–5	Recreation Park	N/A	4–5	L3
11	May 16	@ Buckeyes	8–3	Recreation Park	N/A	5–5	W1
12	May 17	@ Hoosiers	8–2	Bruce Grounds	N/A	6–5	W2
13	May 18	@ Hoosiers	5–1	Bruce Grounds	N/A	7–5	W3
14	May 20	@ Hoosiers	12–0	Bruce Grounds	N/A	8–5	W4
–	May 22	@ Blue Stockings	Postponed (rain); Makeup: August 10 (site change)				
15	May 23	@ Blue Stockings	9–10	League Park	N/A	8–6	L1
16	May 24	@ Blue Stockings	11–2	League Park	N/A	9–6	W1
17	May 26	@ Orioles	3–11	Oriole Park	N/A	9–7	L1
18	May 28	@ Orioles	6–4	Oriole Park	N/A	10–7	W1
19	May 29	@ Orioles	0–2	Oriole Park	N/A	10–8	L1
20	May 30	@ Nationals	6–5	Athletic Park	N/A	11–8	W1
21	May 31	@ Nationals	6–0	Athletic Park	N/A	12–8	W2

June: 14–6 (Home: 6–1; Away: 8–5)

#	Date	Opponent	Score	Stadium	Attendance	Record	Streak
22	June 2	@ Nationals	3–0	Athletic Park	N/A	13–8	W3
23	June 3	@ Metropolitans	10–6	Polo Grounds	N/A	14–8	W4
24	June 4	@ Metropolitans	2–19	Polo Grounds	N/A	14–9	L1
25	June 5	@ Metropolitans	5–2	Polo Grounds	N/A	15–9	W1
26	June 7	@ Atlantics	2–3	Washington Park	N/A	15–10	L1
27	June 9	@ Atlantics	13–10	Washington Park	N/A	16–10	W1
28	June 10	@ Atlantics	8–6	Washington Park	N/A	17–10	W2
29	June 12	@ Alleghenys	7–5	Recreation Park	N/A	18–10	W3
30	June 13	@ Alleghenys	0–2	Recreation Park	N/A	18–11	L1
–	June 14	@ Alleghenys	Postponed (rain); Makeup: June 19				
31	June 16	@ Athletics	14–9	Jefferson Street Grounds	N/A	19–11	W1
32	June 17	@ Athletics	8–10	Jefferson Street Grounds	N/A	19–12	L1
33	June 18	@ Athletics	6–11	Jefferson Street Grounds	N/A	19–13	L2
34	June 19	@ Alleghenys	7–1	Recreation Park	N/A	20–13	W1
35	June 21	Alleghenys	5–0	American Park	N/A	21–13	W2
36	June 22	Alleghenys	4–2	American Park	N/A	22–13	W3
37	June 24	Alleghenys	12–0	American Park	N/A	23–13	W4
38	June 26	Metropolitans	4–0	American Park	N/A	24–13	W5
39	June 27	Metropolitans	4–12	American Park	N/A	24–14	L1
40	June 28	Metropolitans	8–7	American Park	N/A	25–14	W1
41	June 29	Nationals	16–0	American Park	N/A	26–14	W2

July: 15–8 (Home: 11–5; Away: 4–3)

#	Date	Opponent	Score	Stadium	Attendance	Record	Streak
42	July 1	Nationals	16–5	American Park	N/A	27–14	W3
43	July 2	Nationals	16–1	American Park	N/A	28–14	W4
44	July 4 1	Athletics	1–2	American Park	N/A	28–15	L1
45	July 4 2	Athletics	3–4	American Park	N/A	28–16	L2
46	July 5	Athletics	17–2	American Park	N/A	29–16	W1
47	July 6	Atlantics	4–3	American Park	N/A	30–16	W2
48	July 8	Atlantics	10–4	American Park	N/A	31–16	W3
49	July 10	Atlantics	3–4	American Park	N/A	31–17	L1
50	July 12	Orioles	15–10	American Park	N/A	32–17	W1
51	July 13	Orioles	9–2	American Park	N/A	33–17	W2
52	July 15	Orioles	9–2	American Park	N/A	34–17	W3
53	July 17	@ Eclipse	1–2	Eclipse Park	N/A	34–18	L1
54	July 18	@ Eclipse	6–5	Eclipse Park	N/A	35–18	W1
55	July 19	@ Eclipse	1–3	Eclipse Park	N/A	35–19	L1
56	July 20	@ Hoosiers	17–5	Bruce Grounds	N/A	36–19	W1
57	July 22	@ Hoosiers	9–2	Bruce Grounds	N/A	37–19	W2
58	July 23	@ Browns	0–2	Sportsman's Park	N/A	37–20	L1
59	July 24	@ Browns	12–10	Sportsman's Park	N/A	38–20	W1
–	July 25	@ Browns	Postponed (rain); Makeup: August 8				
60	July 26	Eclipse	7–6	American Park	N/A	39–20	W2
61	July 27	Eclipse	6–2	American Park	N/A	40–20	W3
–	July 28	Eclipse	Postponed (rain); Makeup: August 15				
62	July 29	Browns	5–6	American Park	N/A	40–21	L1
63	July 30	Browns	9–8	American Park	N/A	41–21	W1
64	July 31	Browns	2–3	American Park	N/A	41–22	L1

August: 9–11 (Home: 8–5; Away: 1–6)

#	Date	Opponent	Score	Stadium	Attendance	Record	Streak
65	August 2	Blue Stockings	12–0	American Park	N/A	42–22	W1
66	August 3	Blue Stockings	0–3	American Park	N/A	42–23	L1
67	August 5	@ Eclipse	3–6	Eclipse Park	N/A	42–24	L2
68	August 6	@ Eclipse	3–6	Eclipse Park	N/A	42–25	L3
69	August 7	@ Browns	5–4	Sportsman's Park	N/A	43–25	W1
70	August 8	@ Browns	3–5	Sportsman's Park	N/A	43–26	L1
71	August 9	@ Browns	3–4	Sportsman's Park	N/A	43–27	L2
72	August 10	Blue Stockings	10–6	American Park	N/A	44–27	W1
73	August 13	Eclipse	9–2	American Park	N/A	45–27	W2
74	August 14	Eclipse	8–4	American Park	N/A	46–27	W3
75	August 15	Eclipse	4–7	American Park	N/A	46–28	L1
76	August 16	Browns	14–8	American Park	N/A	47–28	W1
77	August 17	Browns	8–10	American Park	N/A	47–29	L1
78	August 23	Buckeyes	3–4	American Park	N/A	47–30	L2
79	August 24	Buckeyes	11–2	American Park	N/A	48–30	W1
80	August 26	Hoosiers	5–4	American Park	N/A	49–30	W2
81	August 27 1	Hoosiers	3–2	American Park	N/A	50–30	W3
82	August 27 2	Hoosiers	7–9	American Park	N/A	50–31	L1
–	August 28	@ Buckeyes	Postponed (rain); Makeup: August 29				
83	August 29	@ Buckeyes	4–6	Recreation Park	N/A	50–32	L2
84	August 30	@ Buckeyes	2–3	Recreation Park	N/A	50–33	L3

September: 12–4 (Home: 10–2; Away: 2–2)

#	Date	Opponent	Score	Stadium	Attendance	Record	Streak
85	September 1	@ Blue Stockings	12–7	League Park	N/A	51–33	W1
86	September 2	@ Blue Stockings	9–7	League Park	N/A	52–33	W2
–	September 4	Metropolitans	Postponed (unknown reason); Makeup: September 5				
87	September 5	Metropolitans	8–13	American Park	N/A	52–34	L1
88	September 6	Metropolitans	3–10	American Park	N/A	52–35	L2
89	September 7	Virginians	12–1	American Park	N/A	53–35	W1
90	September 9	Virginians	17–3	American Park	N/A	54–35	W2
91	September 11	Alleghenys	11–1	American Park	N/A	55–35	W3
92	September 13	Alleghenys	11–6	American Park	N/A	56–35	W4
93	September 14	Atlantics	4–3	American Park	N/A	57–35	W5
94	September 16	Atlantics	11–0	American Park	N/A	58–35	W6
95	September 18	Athletics	9–6	American Park	N/A	59–35	W7
96	September 20	Athletics	7–4	American Park	N/A	60–35	W8
97	September 21	Orioles	11–10	American Park	N/A	61–35	W9
98	September 22	Orioles	5–0	American Park	N/A	62–35	W10
99	September 27	@ Athletics	5–12	Jefferson Street Grounds	N/A	62–36	L1
100	September 29	@ Athletics	1–8	Jefferson Street Grounds	N/A	62–37	L2

October: 6–4 (Home: 1–0; Away: 5–4)

#	Date	Opponent	Score	Stadium	Attendance	Record	Streak
101	October 1	@ Orioles	0–3	Oriole Park	N/A	62–38	L3
102	October 2	@ Orioles	2–4	Oriole Park	N/A	62–39	L4
103	October 3	@ Virginians	8–3	Allen Pasture	N/A	63–39	W1
104	October 4	@ Virginians	7–5	Allen Pasture	N/A	64–39	W2
105	October 6	@ Alleghenys	8–8	Recreation Park	N/A	64–39	W2
106	October 7	@ Alleghenys	8–3	Recreation Park	N/A	65–39	W3
107	October 9	@ Metropolitans	1–5	Polo Grounds	N/A	65–40	L1
108	October 10	Hoosiers	4–3	American Park	N/A	66–40	W1
109	October 11	@ Metropolitans	7–7	Polo Grounds	N/A	66–40	W1
110	October 13	@ Atlantics	5–2	Washington Park	N/A	67–40	W2
111	October 14	@ Metropolitans	3–4	Polo Grounds	N/A	67–41	L1
112	October 15	@ Atlantics	6–1	Washington Park	N/A	68–41	W1

=== Roster ===
1884 Cincinnati Red Stockings
Roster
Pitchers: Ren Deagle; Bill Mountjoy; Gus Shallix; Will White	Catchers: George Miller; Phil Powers; Pop Snyder; Infielders: Hick Carpenter; Frank Fennelly; Chick Fulmer; Bid McPhee; Jimmy Peoples; John Reilly	Outfielders: Frank Berkelbach; Pop Corkhill; Charley Jones; Tom Mansell; Icicle Reeder; Buck West; Jimmy Woulfe	Manager: Pop Snyder; Will White

== Player stats ==
=== Batting ===
==== Starters by position ====
Note: Pos = Position; G = Games played; AB = At bats; H = Hits; Avg. = Batting average; HR = Home runs; RBI = Runs batted in

Pos	Player	G	AB	H	Avg.	HR	RBI
C	Pop Snyder	67	268	69	.257	0	39
1B	John Reilly	105	448	152	.339	11	91
2B	Bid McPhee	112	450	125	.278	5	64
3B	Hick Carpenter	108	474	121	.255	4	60
SS	Jimmy Peoples	69	267	45	.169	1	16
OF	Charley Jones	112	472	148	.314	7	71
OF	Pop Corkhill	110	452	124	.274	4	70
OF	Tom Mansell	65	266	66	.248	0	23

==== Other batters ====
Note: G = Games played; AB = At bats; H = Hits; Avg. = Batting average; HR = Home runs; RBI = Runs batted in

Player	G	AB	H	Avg.	HR	RBI
Phil Powers	35	133	18	.135	0	8
Buck West	33	131	32	.244	1	15
Frank Fennelly	28	122	43	.352	2	?
Chick Fulmer	31	114	20	.175	0	8
Jimmy Woulfe	8	34	5	.147	0	2
Frank Berkelbach	6	25	6	.240	0	3
George Miller	6	20	5	.250	0	3
Icicle Reeder	3	14	2	.143	0	0

=== Pitching ===
==== Starting pitchers ====
Note: G = Games pitched; IP = Innings pitched; W = Wins; L = Losses; ERA = Earned run average; SO = Strikeouts

Player	G	IP	W	L	ERA	SO
Will White	52	456.0	34	18	3.32	118
Bill Mountjoy	33	289.0	19	12	2.93	96
Gus Shallix	23	199.2	11	10	3.70	78
Ren Deagle	4	34.0	3	1	5.03	12

==== Relief pitchers ====
Note: G = Games pitched; W = Wins; L = Losses; SV = Saves; ERA = Earned run average; SO = Strikeouts

Player	G	W	L	SV	ERA	SO
Pop Corkhill	1	1	0	0	1.80	4
