= Marshall Locke =

American baseball player (1857–1940)

- Outfielder
- Born: March 12, 1857; Ashland, Ohio
- Died: March 6, 1940 (aged 82); Ashland, Ohio
- Batted: Unknown Threw: Unknown

MLB debut
- July 5, 1884, for the Indianapolis Hoosiers

Last MLB appearance
- July 20, 1884, for the Indianapolis Hoosiers

MLB statistics
- Batting average: .241
- Home runs: 0
- Runs batted in: 5

Teams
- Indianapolis Hoosiers (1884)

Marshall Pinkney Wilder Locke (March 12, 1857 – March 6, 1940) was a Major League Baseball outfielder for the 1884 Indianapolis Hoosiers.
