= 1884 New York Metropolitans season =

1884 New York Metropolitans
- 1884 American Association Champions
- League: American Association
- Ballpark: Polo Grounds
- City: New York, New York
- Record: 75–32 (.701)
- League place: 1st
- Owners: John B. Day, Jim Mutrie
- Manager: Jim Mutrie

The 1884 New York Metropolitans finished with a 75–32 record, first place in the American Association. After the season, they played the National League champion Providence Grays in the 1884 World Series and lost three games to zero.

== Regular season ==
=== Season standings ===
American Association
Team	W	L	Pct.	GB	Home	Road
New York Metropolitans	75	32	.701	—	42‍–‍9	33‍–‍23
Columbus Buckeyes	69	39	.639	6½	38‍–‍16	31‍–‍23
Louisville Eclipse	68	40	.630	7½	41‍–‍14	27‍–‍26
St. Louis Browns	67	40	.626	8	38‍–‍16	29‍–‍24
Cincinnati Red Stockings	68	41	.624	8	40‍–‍16	28‍–‍25
Baltimore Orioles	63	43	.594	11½	42‍–‍13	21‍–‍30
Philadelphia Athletics	61	46	.570	14	38‍–‍16	23‍–‍30
Toledo Blue Stockings	46	58	.442	27½	28‍–‍25	18‍–‍33
Brooklyn Atlantics	40	64	.385	33½	23‍–‍26	17‍–‍38
Richmond Virginians	12	30	.286	30½	5‍–‍15	7‍–‍15
Pittsburgh Alleghenys	30	78	.278	45½	18‍–‍37	12‍–‍41
Indianapolis Hoosiers	29	78	.271	46	15‍–‍39	14‍–‍39
Washington Nationals	12	51	.190	41	10‍–‍20	2‍–‍31

=== Record vs. opponents ===
1884 American Association record Sources:
Team	BAL	BRO	CIN	COL	IND	LOU	NYM	PHA	PIT	RIC	STL	TOL	WSN
Baltimore	—	5–5	4–6	6–4	9–1	6–4–1	5–5	3–7	9–0	4–0	5–5	5–5–1	2–1
Brooklyn	5–5	—	2–8	3–7	7–3	3–6	1–9–1	3–6	4–6	3–2–1	2–7–1	4–4–2	3–1
Cincinnati	6–4	8–2	—	3–7	9–1–1	5–5	4–6–1	4–6	8–1–1	4–0	4–6	7–3	6–0
Columbus	4–6	7–3	7–3	—	8–2	5–5	4–5	5–5–1	9–1	2–2	5–5	8–1–1	5–1
Indianapolis	1–9	3–7	1–9–1	2–8	—	1–9	2–8	4–6	4–6	1–2–1	3–6–1	3–6	4–2
Louisville	4–6–1	6–3	5–5	5–5	9–1	—	3–7–1	6–3	8–2	4–1	5–5	9–1	4–1
New York	5–5	9–1–1	6–4–1	5–4	8–2	7–3–1	—	8–2	9–1	2–0	5–4–1	5–4–1	6–2
Philadelphia	7–3	6–3	6–4	5–5–1	6–4	3–6	2–8	—	8–2	2–0	3–7	6–3	7–1
Pittsburgh	0–9	6–4	1–8–1	1–9	6–4	2–8	1–9	2–8	—	1–4–1	1–9	5–5	4–1
Richmond	0–4	2–3–1	0–4	2–2	2–1–1	1–4	0–2	0–2	4–1–1	—	1–3	0–4–1	0–0
St. Louis	5–5	7–2–1	6–4	5–5	6–3–1	5–5	4–5–1	7–3	9–1	3–1	—	5–5	5–1
Toledo	5–5–1	4–4–2	3–7	1–8–1	6–3	1–9	4–5–1	3–6	5–5	4–0–1	5–5	—	5–1
Washington	1–2	1–3	0–6	1–5	2–4	1–4	2–6	1–7	1–4	0–0	1–5	1–5	—

=== Roster ===
1884 New York Metropolitans
Roster
Pitchers: Buck Becannon; Tim Keefe; Jack Lynch	Catchers: Bill Holbert; Tony Murphy; Henry Oxley; Charlie Reipschlager; Infielders: Dude Esterbrook; Candy Nelson; Dave Orr; Dasher Troy	Outfielders: Steve Brady; Ed Kennedy; Gracie Pierce; Chief Roseman	Manager: Jim Mutrie

== Player stats ==
=== Batting ===
==== Starters by position ====
Note: Pos = Position; G = Games played; AB = At bats; H = Hits; Avg. = Batting average; HR = Home runs

Pos	Player	G	AB	H	Avg.	HR
C	Bill Holbert	65	255	53	.280	0
1B	Dave Orr	110	458	162	.354	9
2B	Dasher Troy	107	421	111	.264	2
SS	Candy Nelson	111	432	110	.255	1
3B	Dude Esterbrook	112	477	150	.314	1
OF	Chief Roseman	107	436	130	.298	4
OF	Steve Brady	112	485	122	.252	1
OF	Ed Kennedy	103	378	72	.190	1

==== Other batters ====
Note: G = Games played; AB = At bats; H = Hits; Avg. = Batting average; HR = Home runs

Player	G	AB	H	Avg.	HR
Charlie Reipschlager	59	233	56	.240	0
Gracie Pierce	5	20	5	.250	0
Henry Oxley	1	3	0	.000	0
Tony Murphy	1	3	1	.333	0

=== Pitching ===
==== Starting pitchers ====
Note: G = Games pitched; IP = Innings pitched; W = Wins; L = Losses; ERA = Earned run average; SO = Strikeouts

Player	G	IP	W	L	ERA	SO
Jack Lynch	55	496.0	37	15	2.67	292
Tim Keefe	58	483.0	37	17	2.25	334
Buck Becannon	1	6.0	1	0	1.50	2

== The World Series of 1884 ==
Providence Grays (NL) (84–28) vs New York Metropolitans (AA) (75–32)

=== Game 1 ===
Friday, October 23, at the Polo Grounds

Providence defeats New York 6–0

=== Game 2 ===
Saturday, October 24, at the Polo Grounds

Providence defeats New York 3–1 (7 innings)

=== Game 3 ===
Sunday, October 25, at the Polo Grounds

Providence defeats New York 12–2 (6 innings)
