= John Hamill (baseball) =

American baseball player (1860–1911)

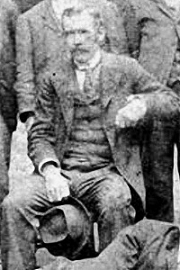
- Pitcher
- Born: December 18, 1860; New York, New York
- Died: December 9, 1911 (aged 50); Bristol, Rhode Island
- Batted: Right Threw: Right

MLB debut
- May 1, 1884, for the Washington Nationals

Last MLB appearance
- July 31, 1884, for the Washington Nationals

MLB statistics
- Wins-Losses: 2–17
- Earned run average: 4.48
- Strikeouts: 50

Teams
- Washington Nationals (1884)

John Alexander Charles Hamill (December 18, 1860 – December 9, 1911) was a Major League Baseball pitcher who played one season for the Washington Nationals of the American Association.

== Professional career ==
=== Washington Nationals ===
Hamill made his Major League debut on May 1, 1884 with the Nationals. He would go on to start all 19 games he played for Washington. He compiled an ERA of 4.48 with two wins, 17 losses and 50 strikeouts. Hamill played his final game with the Nationals on July 31, 1884. He had never played professional baseball prior to joining the Nationals nor did he play it after.
