= 1884 Brooklyn Atlantics season =

1884 Brooklyn Atlantics
- League: American Association
- Ballpark: Washington Park
- City: Brooklyn, New York
- Record: 40–64 (.385)
- League place: 9th
- Owners: Charles Byrne, Ferdinand Abell
- President: Charles Byrne
- Manager: George Taylor

The 1884 Brooklyn Atlantics season was a season in American baseball. It was the first season in the American Association for the team, and they finished the year in ninth place.

The Brooklyn baseball team had played as the Brooklyn Grays in the Interstate Association in 1883, where they won the championship. In 1884, Charles Byrne moved the team into the American Association, renaming them the Atlantics in tribute to the old National Association Brooklyn Atlantics team.

== Regular season ==
=== Season standings ===
American Association
Team	W	L	Pct.	GB	Home	Road
New York Metropolitans	75	32	.701	—	42‍–‍9	33‍–‍23
Columbus Buckeyes	69	39	.639	6½	38‍–‍16	31‍–‍23
Louisville Eclipse	68	40	.630	7½	41‍–‍14	27‍–‍26
St. Louis Browns	67	40	.626	8	38‍–‍16	29‍–‍24
Cincinnati Red Stockings	68	41	.624	8	40‍–‍16	28‍–‍25
Baltimore Orioles	63	43	.594	11½	42‍–‍13	21‍–‍30
Philadelphia Athletics	61	46	.570	14	38‍–‍16	23‍–‍30
Toledo Blue Stockings	46	58	.442	27½	28‍–‍25	18‍–‍33
Brooklyn Atlantics	40	64	.385	33½	23‍–‍26	17‍–‍38
Richmond Virginians	12	30	.286	30½	5‍–‍15	7‍–‍15
Pittsburgh Alleghenys	30	78	.278	45½	18‍–‍37	12‍–‍41
Indianapolis Hoosiers	29	78	.271	46	15‍–‍39	14‍–‍39
Washington Nationals	12	51	.190	41	10‍–‍20	2‍–‍31

=== Record vs. opponents ===
1884 American Association record Sources:
Team	BAL	BRO	CIN	COL	IND	LOU	NYM	PHA	PIT	RIC	STL	TOL	WSN
Baltimore	—	5–5	4–6	6–4	9–1	6–4–1	5–5	3–7	9–0	4–0	5–5	5–5–1	2–1
Brooklyn	5–5	—	2–8	3–7	7–3	3–6	1–9–1	3–6	4–6	3–2–1	2–7–1	4–4–2	3–1
Cincinnati	6–4	8–2	—	3–7	9–1–1	5–5	4–6–1	4–6	8–1–1	4–0	4–6	7–3	6–0
Columbus	4–6	7–3	7–3	—	8–2	5–5	4–5	5–5–1	9–1	2–2	5–5	8–1–1	5–1
Indianapolis	1–9	3–7	1–9–1	2–8	—	1–9	2–8	4–6	4–6	1–2–1	3–6–1	3–6	4–2
Louisville	4–6–1	6–3	5–5	5–5	9–1	—	3–7–1	6–3	8–2	4–1	5–5	9–1	4–1
New York	5–5	9–1–1	6–4–1	5–4	8–2	7–3–1	—	8–2	9–1	2–0	5–4–1	5–4–1	6–2
Philadelphia	7–3	6–3	6–4	5–5–1	6–4	3–6	2–8	—	8–2	2–0	3–7	6–3	7–1
Pittsburgh	0–9	6–4	1–8–1	1–9	6–4	2–8	1–9	2–8	—	1–4–1	1–9	5–5	4–1
Richmond	0–4	2–3–1	0–4	2–2	2–1–1	1–4	0–2	0–2	4–1–1	—	1–3	0–4–1	0–0
St. Louis	5–5	7–2–1	6–4	5–5	6–3–1	5–5	4–5–1	7–3	9–1	3–1	—	5–5	5–1
Toledo	5–5–1	4–4–2	3–7	1–8–1	6–3	1–9	4–5–1	3–6	5–5	4–0–1	5–5	—	5–1
Washington	1–2	1–3	0–6	1–5	2–4	1–4	2–6	1–7	1–4	0–0	1–5	1–5	—

=== Roster ===
1884 Brooklyn Atlantics
Roster
Pitchers: Jim Conway; Sam Kimber; Adonis Terry	Catchers: Jack Corcoran; Jerry Dorgan; John Farrow; Jackie Hayes; Infielders: Billy Geer; Bill Greenwood; Charlie Householder; Charlie Jones; Jimmy Knowles; Fred Warner	Outfielders: Ike Benners; John Cassidy; Jack Remsen; Oscar Walker; Tug Wilson	Manager: George Taylor

== Player stats ==
=== Batting ===
==== Starters by position ====
Note: Pos = Position; G = Games played; AB = At bats; R = Runs scored; H = Hits; Avg. = Batting average; HR = Home runs

Pos	Player	G	AB	R	H	Avg.	HR
C	Jack Corcoran	52	185	17	39	.211	0
1B	Charlie Householder	76	273	28	66	.242	3
2B	Bill Greenwood	92	385	52	83	.216	3
3B	Fred Warner	84	352	40	78	.222	1
SS	Billy Geer	107	391	68	82	.210	0
OF	John Cassidy	106	433	57	109	.252	2
OF	Jack Remsen	81	301	45	67	.223	3
OF	Oscar Walker	95	382	59	103	.270	2

==== Other batters ====
Note: G = Games played; AB = At bats; R = Runs scored; H = Hits; Avg. = Batting average; HR = Home runs

Player	G	AB	R	H	Avg.	HR
Ike Benners	49	189	25	38	.201	1
Jimmy Knowles	41	153	19	36	.235	1
Charlie Jones	25	90	10	16	.178	0
Tug Wilson	24	82	13	19	.232	0
John Farrow	16	58	7	11	.190	0
Jackie Hayes	16	51	4	12	.235	0
Jerry Dorgan	4	13	2	4	.308	0

=== Pitching ===
==== Starting pitchers ====
Note: G = Games pitched; GS = Games started; CG = Complete games; IP = Innings pitched; W = Wins; L = Losses; ERA = Earned run average; BB = Walks allowed; SO = Strikeouts

Player	G	GS	CG	IP	W	L	ERA	BB	SO
Adonis Terry	56	55	54	476.0	19	35	3.55	72	230
Sam Kimber	41	41	41	361.1	18	20	3.81	72	122
Jim Conway	13	13	10	105.1	3	9	4.44	15	25

==== Relief pitchers ====
Note: G = Games pitched; W = Wins; L = Losses; SV = Saves; ERA = Earned run average; SO = Strikeouts

Player	G	W	L	SV	ERA	SO
Billy Geer	2	0	0	0	12.60	1
Jack Corcoran	1	0	0	0	0.00	0
