= Pat Callaghan (baseball) =

American baseball player (1866–1940)

- Third Baseman
- Born: Unknown; New York, New York, US
- Died: Unknown
- Batted: Unknown Threw: Unknown

MLB debut
- May 1, 1884, for the Indianapolis Hoosiers

Last MLB appearance
- July 31, 1884, for the Indianapolis Hoosiers

MLB statistics
- Batting average: .260
- Home runs: 2
- Runs scored: 38
- Stats at Baseball Reference

Teams
- Indianapolis Hoosiers (1884)

Patrick J. Callaghan was an American professional baseball player who was a third baseman in the Major Leagues in 1884. He played for the Indianapolis Hoosiers.
