= Jack Beach =

American baseball player (1862–1896)

- Outfielder
- Born: 1862; Alexandria, Virginia, C.S.
- Died: July 23, 1896; Alexandria, Virginia, U.S.
- Batted: Unknown Threw: Unknown

MLB debut
- May 1, 1884, for the Washington Nationals

Last MLB appearance
- June 12, 1884, for the Washington Nationals

MLB statistics
- Batting average: .097
- Home runs: 0
- Runs batted in: 0
- Stats at Baseball Reference

Teams
- Washington Nationals (1884)

Stonewall Jackson "Jack" Beach (1862 – July 23, 1896) was an American baseball outfielder. He played two seasons in professional baseball, with one at the Major League level.

== Professional career ==
=== Washington Nationals ===
Beach began his career with the Washington Nationals of the American Association in 1884. In his only season at the Major League level, Beach hit .097 with three hits and two doubles in eight games.

=== Virginia League ===
In 1886, Beach played one more season in professional baseball, this time with a local team in the Virginia League. With the Lynchburg, Virginia baseball club he played his final season.
