= Jimmy Woulfe =

American baseball player (1859–1924)

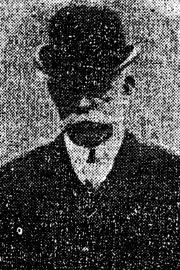
- Outfielder
- Born: November 25, 1859; New Orleans, Louisiana
- Died: December 20, 1924 (aged 65); New Orleans, Louisiana
- Batted: Unknown Threw: Right

MLB debut
- May 16, 1884, for the Cincinnati Red Stockings

Last MLB appearance
- July 23, 1884, for the Pittsburgh Alleghenys

MLB statistics
- Batting average: .126
- Home runs: 0
- RBI: 3
- Stats at Baseball Reference

Teams
- Cincinnati Red Stockings (1884); Pittsburgh Alleghenys (1884)

James Joseph Woulfe (November 25, 1859 – December 20, 1924) was an American professional baseball player. He played one season in Major League Baseball for the 1884 Cincinnati Red Stockings and Pittsburgh Alleghenys, primarily as an outfielder.
