= 1884 Toledo Blue Stockings season =

1884 Toledo Blue Stockings
- League: American Association
- Ballpark: League Park
- City: Toledo, Ohio
- Record: 45–58 (.437)
- League place: 8th
- Manager: Charlie Morton

The 1884 Toledo Blue Stockings finished with a 45–58 record, eighth place in the American Association. This was the only season the team was in a major league.

The team was noteworthy for catcher Fleet Walker and outfielder Weldy Walker, two brothers who are credited as being the first and second African Americans to play Major League Baseball before the color barrier prevented blacks from playing in the majors again until 1947.

== Regular season ==
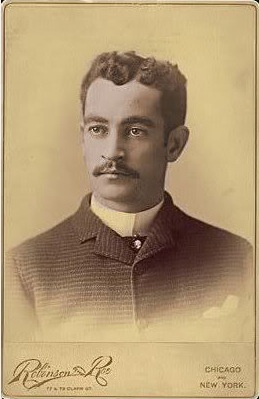
Pitcher Tony Mullane

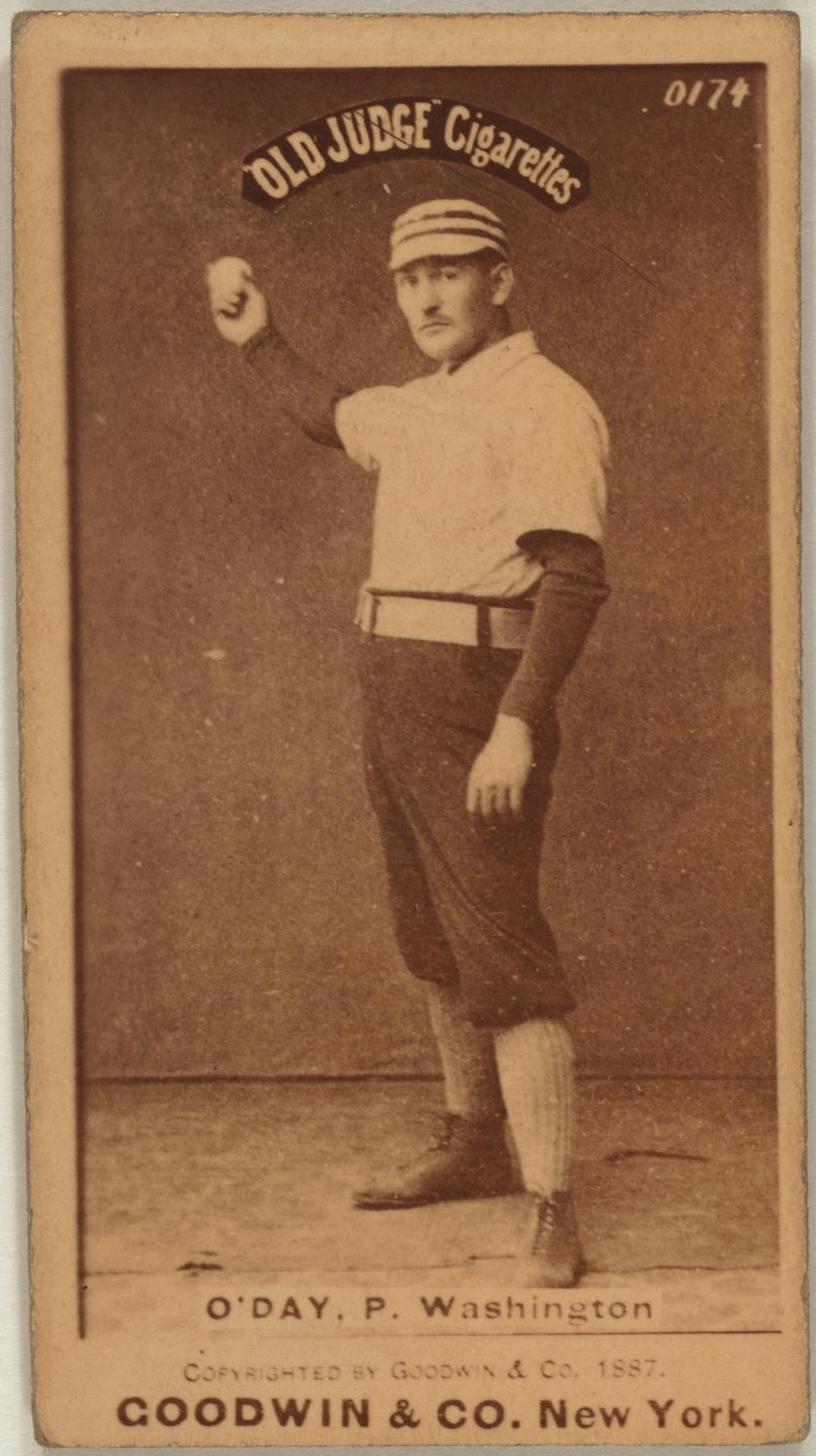
Pitcher Hank O'Day

Center fielder Curt Welch

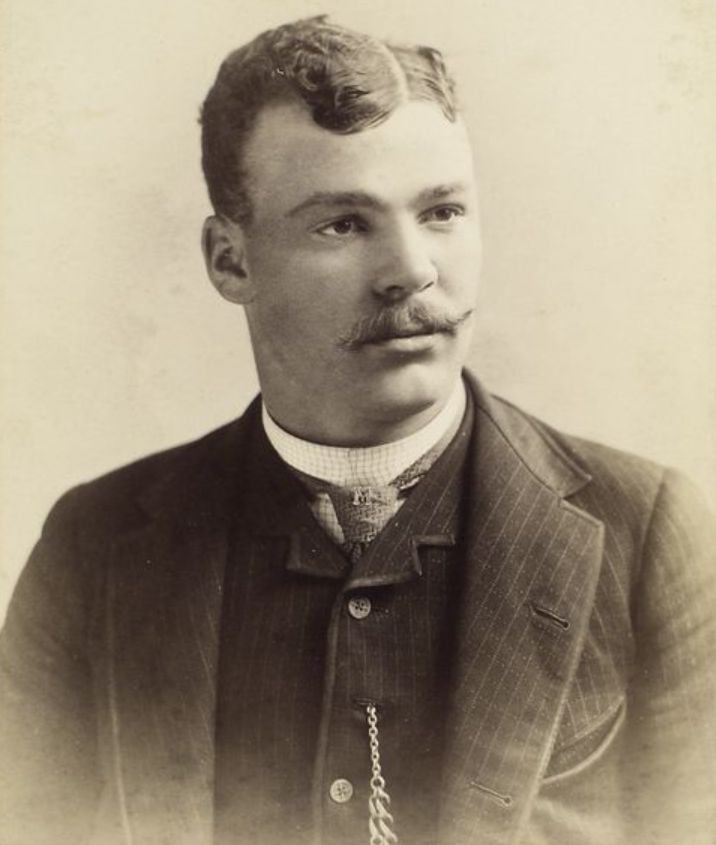
Catcher Deacon McGuire

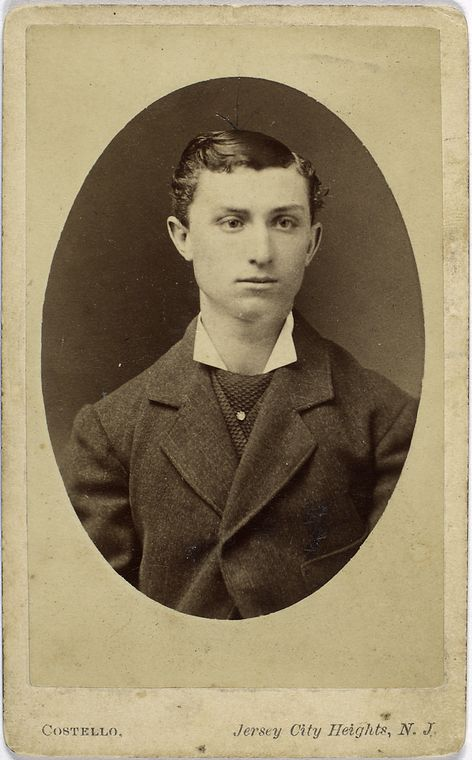
Right fielder Tom Poorman

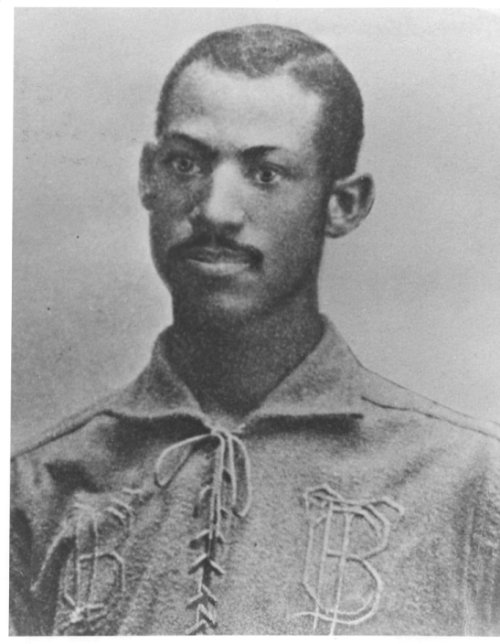
Catcher Moses Fleetwood Walker

Left fielder Weldy Walker

=== Season standings ===
American Association
Team	W	L	Pct.	GB	Home	Road
New York Metropolitans	75	32	.701	—	42‍–‍9	33‍–‍23
Columbus Buckeyes	69	39	.639	6½	38‍–‍16	31‍–‍23
Louisville Eclipse	68	40	.630	7½	41‍–‍14	27‍–‍26
St. Louis Browns	67	40	.626	8	38‍–‍16	29‍–‍24
Cincinnati Red Stockings	68	41	.624	8	40‍–‍16	28‍–‍25
Baltimore Orioles	63	43	.594	11½	42‍–‍13	21‍–‍30
Philadelphia Athletics	61	46	.570	14	38‍–‍16	23‍–‍30
Toledo Blue Stockings	46	58	.442	27½	28‍–‍25	18‍–‍33
Brooklyn Atlantics	40	64	.385	33½	23‍–‍26	17‍–‍38
Richmond Virginians	12	30	.286	30½	5‍–‍15	7‍–‍15
Pittsburgh Alleghenys	30	78	.278	45½	18‍–‍37	12‍–‍41
Indianapolis Hoosiers	29	78	.271	46	15‍–‍39	14‍–‍39
Washington Nationals	12	51	.190	41	10‍–‍20	2‍–‍31

=== Record vs. opponents ===
1884 American Association record Sources:
Team	BAL	BR	CIN	COL	IND	LOU	NY	PHI	PIT	RIC	STL	TOL	WSH
Baltimore	—	5–5	4–6	6–4	9–1	6–4–1	5–5	3–7	9–0	4–0	5–5	5–5–1	2–1
Brooklyn	5–5	—	2–8	3–7	7–3	3–6	1–9–1	3–6	4–6	3–2–1	2–7–1	4–4–2	3–1
Cincinnati	6–4	8–2	—	3–7	9–1–1	5–5	4–6–1	4–6	8–1–1	4–0	4–6	7–3	6–0
Columbus	4–6	7–3	7–3	—	8–2	5–5	4–5	5–5–1	9–1	2–2	5–5	8–1–1	5–1
Indianapolis	1–9	3–7	1–9–1	2–8	—	1–9	2–8	4–6	4–6	1–2–1	3–6–1	3–6	4–2
Louisville	4–6–1	6–3	5–5	5–5	9–1	—	3–7–1	6–3	8–2	4–1	5–5	9–1	4–1
New York	5–5	9–1–1	6–4–1	5–4	8–2	7–3–1	—	8–2	9–1	2–0	5–4–1	5–4–1	6–2
Philadelphia	7–3	6–3	6–4	5–5–1	6–4	3–6	2–8	—	8–2	2–0	3–7	6–3	7–1
Pittsburgh	0–9	6–4	1–8–1	1–9	6–4	2–8	1–9	2–8	—	1–4–1	1–9	5–5	4–1
Richmond	0–4	2–3–1	0–4	2–2	2–1–1	1–4	0–2	0–2	4–1–1	—	1–3	0–4–1	0–0
St. Louis	5–5	7–2–1	6–4	5–5	6–3–1	5–5	4–5–1	7–3	9–1	3–1	—	5–5	5–1
Toledo	5–5–1	4–4–2	3–7	1–8–1	6–3	1–9	4–5–1	3–6	5–5	4–0–1	5–5	—	5–1
Washington	1–2	1–3	0–6	1–5	2–4	1–4	2–6	1–7	1–4	0–0	1–5	1–5	—

=== Roster ===
1884 Toledo Blue Stockings
Roster
Pitchers: Ed Kent; Tony Mullane; Hank O'Day; Catchers: Tug Arundel; Sim Bullas; Deacon McGuire; Fleet Walker	Infielders: Sam Barkley; Ed Brown; Chappy Lane; Trick McSorley; George Meister; Joe Miller; Joe Moffet; Charlie Morton	Outfielders: Ed Miller; Frank Olin; Tom Poorman; John Tilley; Weldy Walker; Curt Welch	Manager: Charlie Morton

== Player stats ==
=== Batting ===
==== Starters by position ====
Note: Pos = Position; G = Games played; AB = At bats; H = Hits; Avg. = Batting average; HR = Home runs

Pos	Player	G	AB	H	Avg.	HR
C	Deacon McGuire	45	151	28	.185	1
1B	Chappy Lane	57	215	49	.228	1
2B	Sam Barkley	104	435	133	.306	1
SS	Joe Miller	105	423	101	.239	0
3B	Ed Brown	42	153	27	.176	0
OF	Curt Welch	109	425	95	.224	0
OF	Frank Olin	26	86	22	.256	1
OF	Tom Poorman	94	382	89	.233	0

==== Other batters ====
Note: G = Games played; AB = At bats; H = Hits; Avg. = Batting average; HR = Home runs

Player	G	AB	H	Avg.	HR
Joe Moffet	56	204	41	.201	0
Fleet Walker	42	152	40	.263	0
Deacon McGuire	45	151	28	.185	1
George Meister	34	119	23	.193	0
Charlie Morton	32	111	18	.162	0
Trick McSorley	21	68	17	.250	0
John Tilley	17	56	10	.179	0
Tug Arundel	15	47	4	.085	0
Sim Bullas	13	45	4	.089	0
Ed Miller	8	24	6	.250	0
Weldy Walker	5	18	4	.222	0

=== Pitching ===
==== Starting pitchers ====
Note: G = Games pitched; IP = Innings pitched; W = Wins; L = Losses; ERA = Earned run average; SO = Strikeouts

Player	G	IP	W	L	ERA	SO
Tony Mullane	67	567.0	36	26	2.52	325
Hank O'Day	41	326.2	9	28	3.75	163
Tom Poorman	1	9.0	0	1	3.00	0
Ed Brown	1	9.0	0	1	9.00	1
Ed Kent	1	9.0	0	1	6.00	4

==== Other pitchers ====
Note: G = Games pitched; IP = Innings pitched; W = Wins; L = Losses; ERA = Earned run average; SO = Strikeouts

Player	G	IP	W	L	ERA	SO
Charlie Morton	3	23.1	0	1	3.09	7

==== Relief pitchers ====
Note: G = Games pitched; W = Wins; L = Losses; SV = Saves; ERA = Earned run average; SO = Strikeouts

Player	G	W	L	SV	ERA	SO
Trick McSorley	1	0	0	0	4.50	1
