= 1884 Philadelphia Athletics season =

1884 Philadelphia Athletics
- League: American Association
- Ballpark: Jefferson Street Grounds
- City: Philadelphia, Pennsylvania
- Record: 61–46 (.570)
- League place: 7th
- Owners: Bill Sharsig, Lew Simmons, Charlie Mason
- Manager: Lon Knight

The 1884 Philadelphia Athletics finished with a 61–46 record and finished in seventh place in the American Association.

== Regular season ==
On May 26, 1884, Athletic welcomed Toledo who featured African-American Moses Fleetwood Walker at catcher to Jefferson Street Grounds. Walker "was applauded when he came to the bat" and went 3 for 5 hitting fourth in a 14-8 Toledo loss.

=== Season standings ===
American Association
Team	W	L	Pct.	GB	Home	Road
New York Metropolitans	75	32	.701	—	42‍–‍9	33‍–‍23
Columbus Buckeyes	69	39	.639	6½	38‍–‍16	31‍–‍23
Louisville Eclipse	68	40	.630	7½	41‍–‍14	27‍–‍26
St. Louis Browns	67	40	.626	8	38‍–‍16	29‍–‍24
Cincinnati Red Stockings	68	41	.624	8	40‍–‍16	28‍–‍25
Baltimore Orioles	63	43	.594	11½	42‍–‍13	21‍–‍30
Philadelphia Athletics	61	46	.570	14	38‍–‍16	23‍–‍30
Toledo Blue Stockings	46	58	.442	27½	28‍–‍25	18‍–‍33
Brooklyn Atlantics	40	64	.385	33½	23‍–‍26	17‍–‍38
Richmond Virginians	12	30	.286	30½	5‍–‍15	7‍–‍15
Pittsburgh Alleghenys	30	78	.278	45½	18‍–‍37	12‍–‍41
Indianapolis Hoosiers	29	78	.271	46	15‍–‍39	14‍–‍39
Washington Nationals	12	51	.190	41	10‍–‍20	2‍–‍31

=== Record vs. opponents ===
1884 American Association record Sources:
Team	BAL	BRO	CIN	COL	IND	LOU	NYM	PHA	PIT	RIC	STL	TOL	WSN
Baltimore	—	5–5	4–6	6–4	9–1	6–4–1	5–5	3–7	9–0	4–0	5–5	5–5–1	2–1
Brooklyn	5–5	—	2–8	3–7	7–3	3–6	1–9–1	3–6	4–6	3–2–1	2–7–1	4–4–2	3–1
Cincinnati	6–4	8–2	—	3–7	9–1–1	5–5	4–6–1	4–6	8–1–1	4–0	4–6	7–3	6–0
Columbus	4–6	7–3	7–3	—	8–2	5–5	4–5	5–5–1	9–1	2–2	5–5	8–1–1	5–1
Indianapolis	1–9	3–7	1–9–1	2–8	—	1–9	2–8	4–6	4–6	1–2–1	3–6–1	3–6	4–2
Louisville	4–6–1	6–3	5–5	5–5	9–1	—	3–7–1	6–3	8–2	4–1	5–5	9–1	4–1
New York	5–5	9–1–1	6–4–1	5–4	8–2	7–3–1	—	8–2	9–1	2–0	5–4–1	5–4–1	6–2
Philadelphia	7–3	6–3	6–4	5–5–1	6–4	3–6	2–8	—	8–2	2–0	3–7	6–3	7–1
Pittsburgh	0–9	6–4	1–8–1	1–9	6–4	2–8	1–9	2–8	—	1–4–1	1–9	5–5	4–1
Richmond	0–4	2–3–1	0–4	2–2	2–1–1	1–4	0–2	0–2	4–1–1	—	1–3	0–4–1	0–0
St. Louis	5–5	7–2–1	6–4	5–5	6–3–1	5–5	4–5–1	7–3	9–1	3–1	—	5–5	5–1
Toledo	5–5–1	4–4–2	3–7	1–8–1	6–3	1–9	4–5–1	3–6	5–5	4–0–1	5–5	—	5–1
Washington	1–2	1–3	0–6	1–5	2–4	1–4	2–6	1–7	1–4	0–0	1–5	1–5	—

=== Notable transactions ===
- August 1884: Frank Ringo was signed as a free agent by the Athletics.

=== Roster ===
1884 Philadelphia Athletics
Roster
Pitchers: Al Atkinson; Bobby Mathews; Phenomenal Smith; Billy Taylor	Catchers: Robert Foster; Jocko Milligan; Jack O'Brien; Frank Ringo; Ed Rowen; Frank Siffell; Infielders: Fred Corey; Sadie Houck; Harry Stovey; Cub Stricker	Outfielders: Jud Birchall; Bob Blakiston; John Coleman; Charlie Hilsey; Lon Knight; Henry Larkin; Mike Mansell; Mike Moynahan	Manager: Lon Knight

== Player stats ==
=== Batting ===
==== Starters by position ====
Note: Pos = Position; G = Games played; AB = At bats; H = Hits; Avg. = Batting average; HR = Home runs

Pos	Player	G	AB	H	Avg.	HR
C	Jocko Milligan	66	268	77	.287	3
1B	Harry Stovey	104	448	146	.326	10
2B	Cub Stricker	107	399	92	.231	1
SS	Sadie Houck	108	472	140	.297	0
3B	Fred Corey	104	439	121	.276	5
OF	Jud Birchall	54	221	57	.258	0
OF	Lon Knight	108	484	131	.271	1
OF	Henry Larkin	85	326	90	.276	3

==== Other batters ====
Note: G = Games played; AB = At bats; H = Hits; Avg. = Batting average; HR = Home runs

Player	G	AB	H	Avg.	HR
Jack O'Brien	36	138	39	.283	1
Bob Blakiston	32	128	33	.258	0
John Coleman	28	107	22	.206	2
Mike Mansell	20	70	14	.200	0
Frank Siffell	7	17	3	.176	0
Ed Rowen	4	15	6	.400	0
Robert Foster	4	11	2	.182	0
Frank Ringo	2	6	0	.000	0
Mike Moynahan	1	4	0	.000	0

=== Pitching ===
==== Starting pitchers ====
Note: G = Games pitched; IP = Innings pitched; W = Wins; L = Losses; ERA = Earned run average; SO = Strikeouts

Player	G	IP	W	L	ERA	SO
Bobby Mathews	49	430.2	30	18	3.32	286
Billy Taylor	30	260.0	18	12	2.53	130
Al Atkinson	22	184.1	11	11	4.20	93
Charlie Hilsey	3	27.0	2	1	4.67	10
Phenomenal Smith	1	9.0	0	1	4.00	3

==== Other pitchers ====
Note: G = Games pitched; IP = Innings pitched; W = Wins; L = Losses; ERA = Earned run average; SO = Strikeouts

Player	G	IP	W	L	ERA	SO
John Coleman	3	21.0	0	2	3.43	5
Lon Knight	2	14.0	0	1	9.00	2

==== Relief pitchers ====
Note: G = Games pitched; W = Wins; L = Losses; SV = Saves; ERA = Earned run average; SO = Strikeouts

Player	G	W	L	SV	ERA	SO
Cub Stricker	1	0	0	0	6.00	1
