= 1884 St. Louis Browns season =

Major League Baseball season

1884 St. Louis Browns
- League: American Association
- Ballpark: Sportsman's Park
- City: St. Louis, Missouri
- Record: 67–40 (.626)
- League place: 4th
- Owner: Chris von der Ahe
- Managers: Jimmy Williams (51–33); Charlie Comiskey (16–7)
- Stats: ESPN.com; Baseball Reference

The 1884 St. Louis Browns season was the team's third season in St. Louis, Missouri, and its third season in the American Association. The Browns went 67–40 during the season and finished fourth in the American Association.

== Regular season ==
=== Season standings ===
American Association
Team	W	L	Pct.	GB	Home	Road
New York Metropolitans	75	32	.701	—	42‍–‍9	33‍–‍23
Columbus Buckeyes	69	39	.639	6½	38‍–‍16	31‍–‍23
Louisville Eclipse	68	40	.630	7½	41‍–‍14	27‍–‍26
St. Louis Browns	67	40	.626	8	38‍–‍16	29‍–‍24
Cincinnati Red Stockings	68	41	.624	8	40‍–‍16	28‍–‍25
Baltimore Orioles	63	43	.594	11½	42‍–‍13	21‍–‍30
Philadelphia Athletics	61	46	.570	14	38‍–‍16	23‍–‍30
Toledo Blue Stockings	46	58	.442	27½	28‍–‍25	18‍–‍33
Brooklyn Atlantics	40	64	.385	33½	23‍–‍26	17‍–‍38
Richmond Virginians	12	30	.286	30½	5‍–‍15	7‍–‍15
Pittsburgh Alleghenys	30	78	.278	45½	18‍–‍37	12‍–‍41
Indianapolis Hoosiers	29	78	.271	46	15‍–‍39	14‍–‍39
Washington Nationals	12	51	.190	41	10‍–‍20	2‍–‍31

=== Record vs. opponents ===
1884 American Association record Sources:
Team	BAL	BRO	CIN	COL	IND	LOU	NYM	PHA	PIT	RIC	STL	TOL	WSN
Baltimore	—	5–5	4–6	6–4	9–1	6–4–1	5–5	3–7	9–0	4–0	5–5	5–5–1	2–1
Brooklyn	5–5	—	2–8	3–7	7–3	3–6	1–9–1	3–6	4–6	3–2–1	2–7–1	4–4–2	3–1
Cincinnati	6–4	8–2	—	3–7	9–1–1	5–5	4–6–1	4–6	8–1–1	4–0	4–6	7–3	6–0
Columbus	4–6	7–3	7–3	—	8–2	5–5	4–5	5–5–1	9–1	2–2	5–5	8–1–1	5–1
Indianapolis	1–9	3–7	1–9–1	2–8	—	1–9	2–8	4–6	4–6	1–2–1	3–6–1	3–6	4–2
Louisville	4–6–1	6–3	5–5	5–5	9–1	—	3–7–1	6–3	8–2	4–1	5–5	9–1	4–1
New York	5–5	9–1–1	6–4–1	5–4	8–2	7–3–1	—	8–2	9–1	2–0	5–4–1	5–4–1	6–2
Philadelphia	7–3	6–3	6–4	5–5–1	6–4	3–6	2–8	—	8–2	2–0	3–7	6–3	7–1
Pittsburgh	0–9	6–4	1–8–1	1–9	6–4	2–8	1–9	2–8	—	1–4–1	1–9	5–5	4–1
Richmond	0–4	2–3–1	0–4	2–2	2–1–1	1–4	0–2	0–2	4–1–1	—	1–3	0–4–1	0–0
St. Louis	5–5	7–2–1	6–4	5–5	6–3–1	5–5	4–5–1	7–3	9–1	3–1	—	5–5	5–1
Toledo	5–5–1	4–4–2	3–7	1–8–1	6–3	1–9	4–5–1	3–6	5–5	4–0–1	5–5	—	5–1
Washington	1–2	1–3	0–6	1–5	2–4	1–4	2–6	1–7	1–4	0–0	1–5	1–5	—

=== Roster ===
1884 St. Louis Browns
Roster
Pitchers: Daisy Davis; Dave Foutz; Jumbo McGinnis; Catchers: Nin Alexander; Pat Deasley; Tom Dolan; Jim McCauley	Infielders: Charlie Comiskey; Chick Fulmer; Bill Gleason; Walt Kinzie; Arlie Latham; Joe Quest	Outfielders: Bob Caruthers; Walt Goldsby; Charlie Krehmeyer; Johnny Lavin; Fred Lewis; Hugh Nicol; Tip O'Neill; George Strief; Al Strueve; Harry Wheeler	Manager: Charlie Comiskey; Jimmy Williams

== Player stats ==
=== Batting ===
==== Starters by position ====
Note: Pos = Position; G = Games played; AB = At bats; H = Hits; Avg. = Batting average; HR = Home runs

Pos	Player	G	AB	H	Avg.	HR
C	Pat Deasley	75	254	52	.205	0
1B	Charlie Comiskey	108	460	109	.237	2
2B	Joe Quest	81	310	64	.206	0
SS	Bill Gleason	110	472	127	.269	1
3B	Arlie Latham	110	474	130	.274	1
OF	Tip O'Neill	78	297	82	.276	3
OF	Fred Lewis	73	300	97	.323	0
OF	Hugh Nicol	110	442	116	.262	0

==== Other batters ====
Note: G = Games played; AB = At bats; H = Hits; Avg. = Batting average; HR = Home runs

Player	G	AB	H	Avg.	HR
George Strief	48	184	37	.201	2
Tom Dolan	35	137	36	.263	0
Bob Caruthers	23	82	22	.268	2
Charlie Krehmeyer	21	70	16	.229	0
Johnny Lavin	16	52	11	.212	0
Walt Goldsby	5	20	4	.200	0
Harry Wheeler	5	19	5	.263	0
Walt Kinzie	2	9	1	.111	0
Al Strueve	2	7	2	.286	0
Chick Fulmer	1	5	0	.000	0
Nin Alexander	1	4	0	.000	0
Jim McCauley	1	2	0	.000	0

=== Pitching ===
==== Starting pitchers ====
Note: G = Games pitched; IP = Innings pitched; W = Wins; L = Losses; ERA = Earned run average; SO = Strikeouts

Player	G	IP	W	L	ERA	SO
Jumbo McGinnis	40	354.1	24	16	2.84	141
Dave Foutz	25	206.2	15	6	2.18	95
Daisy Davis	25	198.1	10	12	2.90	143
Tip O'Neill	17	141.0	11	4	2.68	36

==== Other pitchers ====
Note: G = Games pitched; IP = Innings pitched; W = Wins; L = Losses; ERA = Earned run average; SO = Strikeouts

Player	G	IP	W	L	ERA	SO
Bob Caruthers	13	82.2	7	2	2.61	58

==== Relief pitchers ====
Note: G = Games pitched; W = Wins; L = Losses; SV = Saves; ERA = Earned run average; SO = Strikeouts

Player	G	W	L	SV	ERA	SO
Charlie Comiskey	1	0	0	0	2.25	4
