= Lyman Drake =

American baseball player (1852–1932)

- Outfielder
- Born: February 9, 1852; Berea, Ohio, U.S.
- Died: February 6, 1932 (aged 79); Muskegon, Michigan, U.S.
- Batted: Unknown Threw: Unknown

MLB debut
- June 29, 1884, for the Washington Nationals

Last MLB appearance
- July 1, 1884, for the Washington Nationals

MLB statistics
- Batting average: .286
- Home runs: 0
- Runs batted in: 2
- Stats at Baseball Reference

Teams
- Washington Nationals (1884)

Lyman Daniel Drake (February 9, 1852 – February 6, 1932) was an American Major League Baseball outfielder. In 1884, as a 32-year- old he tried out unsuccessfully to play left field for the Cleveland Blues of the National League. He did not make the team but in May he joined the Fort Wayne Hoosiers of the Northwestern League. At the end of June, he joined the Washington Nationals of the American Association and played 2 games for them against the Cincinnati Red Stockings. He recorded two hits in seven at-bats. Cincinnati won both games by scores of 16-0 and 16-5. Drake was then let go from the team, possibly due to defensive deficiencies. Drake later became a superintendent for reform schools for boys, first in Missouri, then in Iowa.
