= Indianapolis Hoosiers (American Association) =

American professional baseball team

The Indianapolis Hoosiers (or, according to some sources, the Indianapolis Blues) were a professional baseball team that played one season at the major league level. They played in the American Association in 1884 and finished in 12th place with a 29–78 record, 46 games behind the first-place New York Metropolitans. Their home games were played at Seventh Street Park in Indianapolis. They were managed first by Jim Gifford, then Bill Watkins.

This team was the first of three major league baseball teams to bear the name Indianapolis Hoosiers, although they were unrelated to either the version that played in the National League from 1887 until 1889, or to the Federal League team of 1914.

== See also ==
- 1884 Indianapolis Hoosiers season

== Sources ==
- 1884 AA Hoosiers at Baseball Reference
