= Massachusetts State Association =

Defunct American baseball league

- Classification: Independent (1884)
- Sport: Minor League Baseball
- First season: 1884
- Folded: August 15, 1884
- President: M. H. Nichols (1884)
- No. of teams: 8
- Country: United States of America
- Most titles: 1 Springfield (1884)
- Related competitions: New England Association

The Massachusetts State Association was a minor league baseball league that played briefly in the 1884 season. The Non-Signatory, Independent level league consisted of franchises based exclusively in Massachusetts. The Massachusetts State Association was an eight–team league that permanently folded after playing a partial 1884 season.

League member Boston Reserves were owned and operated by the major league Boston Beaneaters and may have been the first true baseball farm team.

== History ==
Formed for the 1884 season, the Massachusetts State Association began play on May 1, 1884, as an eight–team league, with teams scheduled for one or two games per week. The league was a Non-Signatory Independent level league under president M. H. Nichols. The league lost four teams during the season, on July 21, 1884.

The Massachusetts State Association played in 1884. The charter members were the Boston Reserves and teams from Holyoke, Massachusetts, Lawrence, Massachusetts, Lynn, Massachusetts, Salem, Massachusetts, Springfield, Massachusetts, Waltham, Massachusetts and Worcester, Massachusetts.

The 1884 Boston Reserves were the first minor league baseball team to play in Boston, Massachusetts. The Reserves were owned and operated by the Boston Beaneaters of the National League and may have been the first true baseball farm team.

On July 21, 1884, the Worcester, Waltham, Lynn and Salem teams all disbanded, leaving the Massachusetts State Association with four remaining teams. The league concluded play on August 15, 1884. The Massachusetts State Association standings were led by first place Springfield with a 12–5 record, 1.0 games ahead of the second place Boston Reserves (13–8), followed by Holyoke (7–11) and Lawrence (7–15). Lynn (4–8), Salem (2–11), Waltham (9–6) and Worcester (11–4) had previously folded.

After the season, the Massachusetts State Association permanently folded, playing only the 1884 season.

== Massachusetts State Association teams ==
Team name	City represented	Ballpark	Year(s) active
Boston Reserves	Boston, MA	Unknown	1884
Holyoke	Holyoke, MA	Unknown	1884
Lawrence	Lawrence, MA	Association Grounds	1884
Lynn	Lynn, MA	Unknown	1884
Salem	Salem, MA	Unknown	1884
Springfield	Springfield, MA	Pynchon Park	1884
Waltham	Waltham, MA	Unknown	1884
Worcester	Worcester, MA	Driving Park	1884

== Standings & statistics ==
=== 1884 Massachusetts State Association ===
Team standings	W	L	PCT	GB	Managers
Springfield	12	5	.706	–	Charles Shaw
Boston Reserves	13	8	.619	1	John Morrill / S. R. Brown
Holyoke	7	11	.389	5½	Horace Rescott (5/8)
Lawrence	7	15	.318	7½	Harry Clarke / L. S. Dow / Charles Freleigh / Matthew Barry / Frank Selee
Worcester	11	4	.733	NA	David McGarvey (5/21) / Matthew Barry
Waltham	9	6	.600	NA	Frank Selee
Lynn	4	8	.333	NA	Wallace Fessenden (7/2) / Edward Chamberlain
Salem	2	11	.154	NA	F. W. Doyle

Worcester, Waltham, Lynn and Salem disbanded July 21.

Player statistics
Player	Team	Stat	Tot	Player	Team	Stat	Tot
Alexander Gardner	Lawrence	BA	.396	George Fish	Waltham/Lawrence	W	14
Timothy Brosnan	Springfield	Runs	24	George Fish	Waltham/Lawrence	SO	113
Maurice Bresnahan	Waltham/Lawrence	Hits	37	George Fish	Waltham/Lawrence	PCT	.824 14–3
Michael Bradley; Edward Chamberlain; Henry Parry	Lawrence; Lynn/Boston; Waltham	HR	1				

== Notable alumni ==
- Bill Annis, Boston
- Dick Blaisdell, Lynn
- Marty Barrett, Boston
- Jack Carney, Salem
- Peter Connell, Springfield
- John Connor, Boston
- Charlie Daniels, Lawrence
- Jim Donnelly, Lynn
- Wally Fessenden, Lynn
- Jocko Flynn, Lawrence
- Bernie Graham, Worcester
- Tom Gunning, Boston
- Mike Hines, Boston
- Al Hubbard, Springfield
- Jerry Hurley, Boston/Lawrence
- Mike Jordan, Lawrence
- John Kiley, Lawrence
- Jim Manning, Boston
- Chippy McGarr, Worcester
- Jack McGeachey, Holyoke
- Cyclone Miller, Springfield
- George Moolic, Lawrence
- Gene Moriarty, Boston
- Billy Murray, Salem
- Henry Oxley, Lynn
- Charlie Reilley, Worcester
- Bill Rollinson, Holyoke
- Jimmy Ryan, Holyoke
- Pat Scanlon, Holyoke
- Mike Sullivan, Lawrence/Worcester
- Ed Trumbull, Holyoke
- Tommy Tucker, Holyoke
