= 1884 Providence Grays season =

Major League Baseball season

1884 Providence Grays
- National League champions World Series champions
- League: National League
- Ballpark: Messer Street Grounds
- City: Providence, Rhode Island
- Record: 84–28 (.750)
- League place: 1st
- Owner: C. T. Gardner
- Manager: Frank Bancroft

The Providence Grays went 84–28 during the 1884 season to win the National League championship. The team started out with two main pitchers, Charles "Old Hoss" Radbourn and Charlie Sweeney. After Sweeney jumped to the Union Association in mid-season, Radbourn pitched most of the Grays' remaining games and led the team to the pennant. Radbourn won 60 games by himself, setting a Major League Baseball record that has never been broken.

After the regular season, the Grays faced the American Association champions, the New York Metropolitans, in the 1884 World Series. The Grays swept the series to become the "World Champions."

== Summary ==
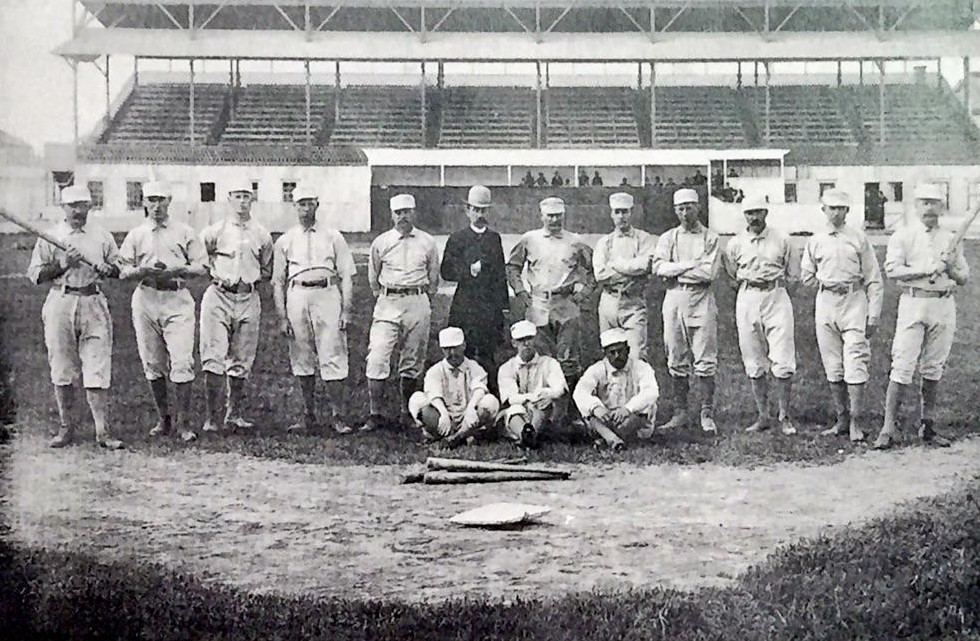
1884 Providence Grays

=== Background ===
In 1883, the Providence Grays finished in third place. Pitcher Charles "Old Hoss" Radbourn won 48 games. Before the 1884 season, manager Harry Wright left the team and was replaced by Frank Bancroft. The franchise was on shaky financial ground, and ownership was close to disbanding the team.

=== Pitching rivalry ===
In early 1884, the Grays' two main pitchers were Radbourn and Charlie Sweeney. Both Radbourn and Sweeney were talented pitchers but also vain and temperamental. Through much of April and May, the younger Sweeney outshone the veteran Radbourn, creating tension between the two.

On June 7, 1884, Sweeney struck out 19 Boston batters to set the single-game MLB record. The record would be tied a few times but not broken for 102 years, until Roger Clemens struck out 20 in a game in 1986. Sweeney was feted upon his return to Providence for days following his accomplishment, much to the bitter jealousy of Radbourn.

Not long after that, Sweeney suffered arm problems which sidelined him. This meant that Radbourn would suffer the workload of two men, further driving a wedge between the veteran and the upstart. The two eventually fought in the clubhouse, and on July 16, Radbourn had a meltdown on the mound, intentionally lobbing several slow pitches over the plate in a losing effort. He was suspended from the team. Sweeney was forced to return to his regular pitching duties, which he did effectively for a time.

=== Sweeney's blowup ===
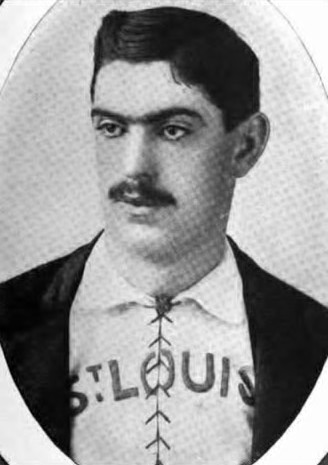
Charlie Sweeney

Following an exhibition game on July 21 in Woonsocket, Rhode Island, Sweeney, who had allegedly been drinking throughout the game, refused to return with the team to Providence, choosing to stay in Woonsocket with a lady he had escorted to the park that day. Waking the next morning, he realized he missed morning practice and raced to make it back to Providence for his start that afternoon. Though most players at the time were held to temperance clauses during the season, Grays manager Frank Bancroft was left with little choice but to pitch Sweeney.

After five effective innings, Bancroft signaled for the team captain Joe Start to make a pitching change. Sweeney refused to budge and continued to pitch for another two innings. With the Grays leading 6–2 before the start of the eighth inning, Bancroft insisted that Sweeney vacate the pitcher's box and move to right field. Still intoxicated, as well as the prevailing sentiment of 1880s baseball being that finishing a game a pitcher started was a question of manhood, Sweeney flatly refused. When Bancroft threatened the pitcher with a $50 fine, Sweeney told him to take his fine and the rest of his salary, promptly quitting. This left Providence with only eight players. With two men to cover the outfield, they lost the game. Sweeney watched the rest of the game in street clothes and left with two women, presumably prostitutes. The Grays subsequently expelled Sweeney from the National League.

Sweeney then signed with the St. Louis Maroons of the Union Association, helping the Maroons win the UA's only championship. For the season, Sweeney pitched 221 innings for the Grays, going 17–8 with a 1.55 ERA, and pitched 271 innings for the Maroons, going 24–7 with a 1.83 ERA.

=== Radbourn's record ===
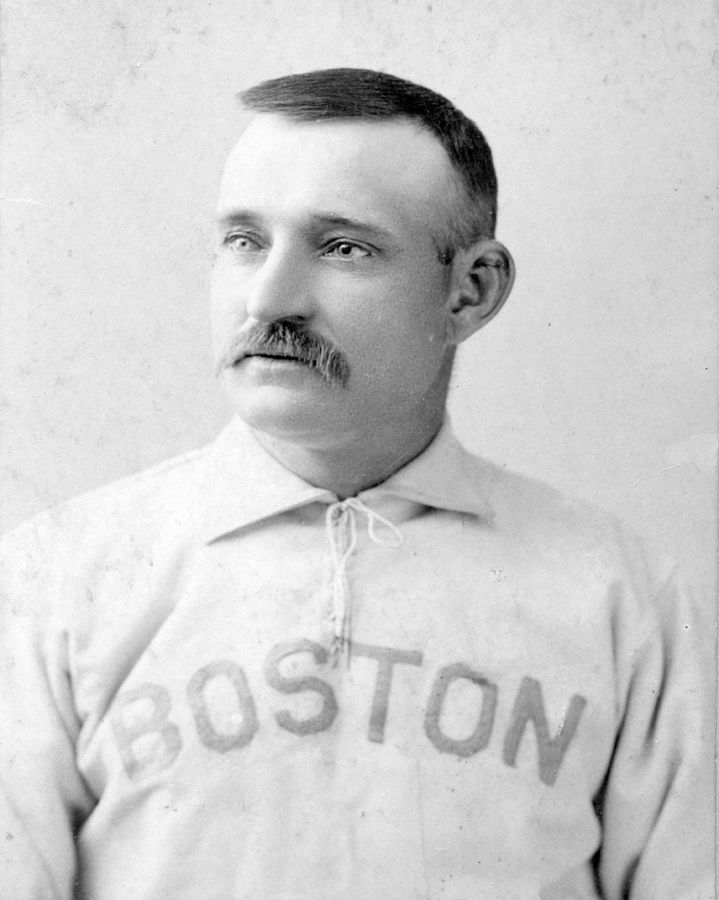
Old Hoss Radbourn

With only one main pitcher left, the Grays were left in a state of disarray with the consensus view that the team should be disbanded. At that point, Radbourn, who had spent the last several weeks demanding he be paid for doing the work of two men, offered to start every game for the rest of the season (having pitched in 76 of 98 games the season before). In exchange, he wanted a raise and exemption from the reserve clause for the next season. Ownership agreed, and Radbourn got his raise.

Over the Grays' next 43 games, Radbourn started 40 of them and won 36. Soon, pitching every other day as he was, his arm became so sore he couldn't even raise it to comb his hair. On game day he was at the ballpark hours before the start, getting warmed up. He began his warm up by throwing just a few feet, increasing the distance gradually until he was pitching from second base and finally from short center field. Led by Radbourn, the Grays got hot and stayed hot, clinching the National League championship on September 24 and finishing the season with a record of 84–28.

Radbourn himself finished the season with a league-leading 678.2 innings pitched and 73 complete games, and he won the Triple Crown with a record of 60–12, a 1.38 earned run average, and 441 strikeouts. His 60 wins in a season is a record which is expected to never be broken because no pitcher has made even as many as 37 starts in a season since 1991. Also, his 678.2 innings pitched stands at second all-time, behind only Will White (680 in 1879) for a single season.

=== World Series ===
At the end of the season, Providence officials accepted New York Metropolitans (AA) manager Jim Mutrie's challenge to a three-game postseason match, which became known as the first World Series. All of the games took place at the Polo Grounds in New York and were played under American Association rules, which forbade overhand pitching. Each team put up one thousand dollars with the winner taking all.

Game 1 took place on October 23. Radbourn allowed two hits and struck out nine, and the Grays defeated the Metropolitans, 6–0. New York's ace pitcher, Tim Keefe, took the loss.

The next day, Radbourn three-hit the Metropolitans and won 3–1 in a game called after seven innings due to darkness. Grays third baseman Jerry Denny hit a three-run home run in the fifth inning, the first homer in World Series history. Keefe lost for the second time.

Providence had clinched the series, but New York, hoping to generate more revenue, asked them to play the third game anyway. The Grays agreed to play as long as they had the option of choosing the umpire, and they strategically chose Keefe, the Metropolitans' best pitcher. Due to the extremely cold weather, the attendance for the game was just 300, and the game was called after six innings. Radbourn, pitching his third complete game in three days, led the Grays to a 12–2 rout. Buck Becannon was the losing pitcher for New York.

Overall, Radbourn pitched all 22 innings in the series, allowing 11 hits, three unearned runs, and no earned runs. The total attendance for the three games was 3,800. Local newspaper The New York Clipper called the series "The Championship of the United States." Several newspapers such as The Sporting Life penned the Grays as "World Champions," and the new title stuck.

== Regular season ==
=== Season standings ===
National League
Team	W	L	Pct.	GB	Home	Road
Providence Grays	84	28	.750	—	45‍–‍11	39‍–‍17
Boston Beaneaters	73	38	.658	10½	40‍–‍16	33‍–‍22
Buffalo Bisons	64	47	.577	19½	37‍–‍18	27‍–‍29
New York Gothams	62	50	.554	22	34‍–‍22	28‍–‍28
Chicago White Stockings	62	50	.554	22	39‍–‍17	23‍–‍33
Philadelphia Quakers	39	73	.348	45	19‍–‍37	20‍–‍36
Cleveland Blues	35	77	.312	49	22‍–‍34	13‍–‍43
Detroit Wolverines	28	84	.250	56	18‍–‍38	10‍–‍46

=== Record vs. opponents ===
1884 National League record Sources:
Team	BSN	BUF	CHI	CLE	DET	NYG	PHI	PRO
Boston	—	9–6–2	10–6	14–2	12–4–1	8–8–1	13–3	7–9–1
Buffalo	6–9–2	—	10–6–1	14–2	12–4	5–11–1	11–5	6–10
Chicago	6–10	6–10–1	—	8–8	11–5	12–4	14–2	5–11
Cleveland	2–14	2–14	8–8	—	9–7	5–11	6–10–1	3–13
Detroit	4–12–1	4–12	5–11	7–9	—	2–14–1	5–11	1–15
New York	8–8–1	11–5–1	4–12	11–5	14–2–1	—	11–5	3–13–1
Philadelphia	3–13	5–11	2–14	10–6–1	11–5	5–11	—	3–13
Providence	9–7–1	10–6	11–5	13–3	15–1	13–3–1	13–3	—

=== Roster ===
1884 Providence Grays
Roster
Pitchers: Harry Arundel; John Cattanach; Ed Conley; Cyclone Miller; Old Hoss Radbourn; Charlie Sweeney	Catchers: Barney Gilligan; Miah Murray; Sandy Nava; Infielders: Charley Bassett; Jerry Denny; Jack Farrell; Arthur Irwin; Joe Start	Outfielders: Cliff Carroll; Paul Hines; Paul Radford	Manager: Frank Bancroft

== Player stats ==
=== Batting ===
==== Starters by position ====
Note: Pos = Position; G = Games played; AB = At bats; H = Hits; Avg. = Batting average; HR = Home runs; RBI = Runs batted in

Pos	Player	G	AB	H	Avg.	HR	RBI
C	Barney Gilligan	82	294	72	.245	1	38
1B	Joe Start	93	381	105	.276	2	32
2B	Jack Farrell	111	469	102	.217	1	37
3B	Jerry Denny	110	439	109	.248	6	59
SS	Arthur Irwin	102	404	97	.240	2	44
OF	Paul Hines	114	490	148	.302	3	41
OF	Paul Radford	97	355	70	.197	1	29
OF	Cliff Carroll	113	452	118	.261	3	54

==== Other batters ====
Note: G = Games played; AB = At bats; H = Hits; Avg. = Batting average; HR = Home runs; RBI = Runs batted in

Player	G	AB	H	Avg.	HR	RBI
Sandy Nava	34	116	11	.095	0	6
Charley Bassett	27	79	11	.139	0	6
Miah Murray	8	27	5	.185	0	1
John Cattanach	1	4	0	.000	0	0

=== Pitching ===
==== Starting pitchers ====
Note: G = Games pitched; IP = Innings pitched; W = Wins; L = Losses; ERA = Earned run average; SO = Strikeouts

Player	G	IP	W	L	ERA	SO
Old Hoss Radbourn	75	678.2	60	12	1.38	441
Charlie Sweeney	27	221.0	17	8	1.55	145
Ed Conley	8	71.0	4	4	2.15	33
Cyclone Miller	6	34.2	2	2	2.08	12
Paul Radford	2	13.0	0	2	7.62	2
Harry Arundel	1	9.0	1	0	1.00	4
John Cattanach	1	5.0	0	0	9.00	2

==== Relief pitchers ====
Note: G = Games pitched; W = Wins; L = Losses; SV = Saves; ERA = Earned run average; SO = Strikeouts

Player	G	W	L	SV	ERA	SO
Arthur Irwin	1	0	0	0	3.00	0
Paul Hines	1	0	0	0	0.00	0

== 1884 World Series ==
Providence Grays (NL) (84–28) vs New York Metropolitans (AA) (75–32)

=== Game 1 ===
Thursday, October 23, at the Polo Grounds

Providence defeats New York 6–0

Umpire: John Kelly

Time of game: 2:00

=== Game 2 ===
Friday, October 24, at the Polo Grounds

Providence defeats New York 3–1 (7 innings)

Umpire: John Remsen

Time of game: 1:35

=== Game 3 ===
Saturday, October 25, at the Polo Grounds

Providence defeats New York 12–2 (6 innings)

Umpire: Timothy Keefe

Time of game: 1:20
