= 1884 Boston Beaneaters season =

1884 Boston Beaneaters
- League: National League
- Ballpark: South End Grounds
- City: Boston, Massachusetts
- Record: 73–38 (.658)
- League place: 2nd
- Owner: Arthur Soden
- Manager: John Morrill

The 1884 Boston Beaneaters season was the 14th season of the franchise.

== Regular season ==
=== Season standings ===
National League
Team	W	L	Pct.	GB	Home	Road
Providence Grays	84	28	.750	—	45‍–‍11	39‍–‍17
Boston Beaneaters	73	38	.658	10½	40‍–‍16	33‍–‍22
Buffalo Bisons	64	47	.577	19½	37‍–‍18	27‍–‍29
New York Gothams	62	50	.554	22	34‍–‍22	28‍–‍28
Chicago White Stockings	62	50	.554	22	39‍–‍17	23‍–‍33
Philadelphia Quakers	39	73	.348	45	19‍–‍37	20‍–‍36
Cleveland Blues	35	77	.312	49	22‍–‍34	13‍–‍43
Detroit Wolverines	28	84	.250	56	18‍–‍38	10‍–‍46

=== Record vs. opponents ===
1884 National League record Sources:
Team	BSN	BUF	CHI	CLE	DET	NYG	PHI	PRO
Boston	—	9–6–2	10–6	14–2	12–4–1	8–8–1	13–3	7–9–1
Buffalo	6–9–2	—	10–6–1	14–2	12–4	5–11–1	11–5	6–10
Chicago	6–10	6–10–1	—	8–8	11–5	12–4	14–2	5–11
Cleveland	2–14	2–14	8–8	—	9–7	5–11	6–10–1	3–13
Detroit	4–12–1	4–12	5–11	7–9	—	2–14–1	5–11	1–15
New York	8–8–1	11–5–1	4–12	11–5	14–2–1	—	11–5	3–13–1
Philadelphia	3–13	5–11	2–14	10–6–1	11–5	5–11	—	3–13
Providence	9–7–1	10–6	11–5	13–3	15–1	13–3–1	13–3	—

=== Roster ===
1884 Boston Beaneaters
Roster
Pitchers: Charlie Buffinton; John Connor; Daisy Davis; Jim Whitney	Catchers: Marty Barrett; Tom Gunning; Mert Hackett; Mike Hines; Infielders: Jack Burdock; John Morrill; Ezra Sutton; Sam Wise	Outfielders: Bill Annis; Bill Crowley; Joe Hornung; Jim Manning; Gene Moriarty	Manager: John Morrill

== Player stats ==
=== Batting ===
==== Starters by position ====
Note: Pos = Position; G = Games played; AB = At bats; H = Hits; Avg. = Batting average; HR = Home runs; RBI = Runs batted in

Pos	Player	G	AB	H	Avg.	HR	RBI
C	Mert Hackett	72	268	55	.205	1	20
1B	John Morrill	111	438	114	.260	3	61
2B	Jack Burdock	87	361	97	.269	6	49
3B	Ezra Sutton	110	468	162	.346	3	61
SS	Sam Wise	114	426	91	.214	4	41
OF	Bill Crowley	108	407	110	.270	6	61
OF	Jim Manning	89	345	83	.241	2	35
OF	Joe Hornung	115	518	139	.268	7	51

==== Other batters ====
Note: G = Games played; AB = At bats; H = Hits; Avg. = Batting average; HR = Home runs; RBI = Runs batted in

Player	G	AB	H	Avg.	HR	RBI
Jim Whitney	66	270	70	.259	3	40
Mike Hines	35	132	23	.174	0	3
Bill Annis	27	96	17	.177	0	3
Tom Gunning	12	45	5	.111	0	2
Gene Moriarty	4	16	1	.063	0	0
Marty Barrett	3	6	0	.000	0	0

=== Pitching ===
==== Starting pitchers ====
Note: G = Games pitched; IP = Innings pitched; W = Wins; L = Losses; ERA = Earned run average; SO = Strikeouts

Player	G	IP	W	L	ERA	SO
Charlie Buffinton	67	587.0	48	16	76	417
Jim Whitney	38	336.0	23	14	2.09	270
John Connor	7	60.0	1	4	3.15	29
Daisy Davis	4	31.0	1	3	7.84	13

==== Relief pitchers ====
Note: G = Games pitched; W = Wins; L = Losses; SV = Saves; ERA = Earned run average; SO = Strikeouts

Player	G	W	L	SV	ERA	SO
John Morrill	7	0	1	2	7.43	13
