= Boston, Massachusetts minor league baseball history =

Boston, Massachusetts minor league baseball teams
- 1884–1893; (1884 1886–1887, 1893); Boston, Massachusetts

Minor league affiliations
- Class: Independent (1884, 1886–1887, 1893)
- League: Massachusetts State Association (1884); New England League (1886–1887, 1893)

Major league affiliations
- Team: None

Minor league titles
- League titles (0): None

Team data
- Name: Boston Reserves (1884); Boston Blues (1886–1887); Boston Reds (1893)
- Ballpark: South End Grounds (1886–1887, 1893)

Minor league baseball teams were based in Boston, Massachusetts between 1884 and 1893. The Boston Blues (1886–1887) and Boston Reds (1893) played as members of the New England League. Earlier, the Boston Reserves played as members of the Massachusetts State Association in 1884 and may have been the first true farm team. The Boston minor league teams shared the city with the Boston major league teams. The 1893 Boston Reds were the final minor league team hosted in Boston.

== History ==
The 1884 Boston Reserves were the first minor league baseball team to play in Boston, Massachusetts. The Reserves were owned and operated by the Boston Beaneaters of the National League and may have been the first true baseball farm team. The Boston Reserves played as charter members of the eight–team Massachusetts State Association, which played one or two games per week in its only season of play. The Boston Reserves of the Massachusetts State Association ended the 1884 season with a record of 13–8, finishing in second place in the Massachusetts State Association, ending the season just 1.0 games behind first place Springfield. John Morrill and S.R. Brown served as Boston's managers. The Boston Reserves played in the league alongside Holyoke (7–11), Lawrence (7–15), Lynn (4–8), Salem (2–11), Springfield (12–5), Waltham (9–6) and Worcester (11–4).

In 1886, Boston fielded another minor league team, as the Boston Blues became members of the New England League. The Blues finished the 1886 season with a record of 35–63, placing sixth and last in the New England League, playing the season under managers Walter Burnham and Tim Murnane. The Boston Blues finished in the New England League standings with Brockton (45–56), Haverhill (59–38), Lawrence (42–55), Newburyport Clamdiggers/Lynn (53–52) and Portland (66–36). The Blues played their home games at the South End Grounds.

The Boston Blues returned to play in the 1887 New England League, but relocated during the season. The Boston Blues had a 35–18 record when the franchise moved to Haverhill, Massachusetts on July 11, 1887. The Boston/Haverhill Blues ended the 1887 New England League season with a record of 47–36, placing third in the eight–team New England League, finishing 13.5 games behind the first place Lowell Magicians. Walter Burnham was the Boston manager.

In 1893, Boston returned briefly to the New England League, playing as the Boston Reds. The Lowell Tigers team had a 14–20 record when the franchise relocated to become the Manchester Blue Sox on June 26, 1893. The team was 3–13 while based in Manchester. Manchester then relocated the franchise to Boston on July 16, 1893, to complete the New England League season. The Lowell/Manchester/Boston Reds finished the 1893 season with an overall record of 29–55, placing last in the six–team in the New England League, finishing 28.0 games behind the first place Fall River Indians. Bill McGunnigle and Thomas H. O'Brien served as managers of the Lowell/Manchester/Boston team.

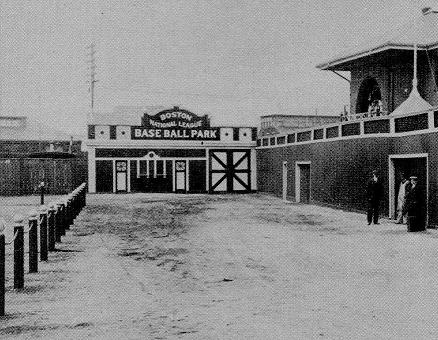
South End Grounds gate

The 1893 Boston Reds did not return to the New England League the next season and were the last minor league team to be based in Boston. The Boston Blues moniker was revived in 1946 by the Boston Blues team, a Negro league baseball franchise, which played as members of the United States League.

== The ballpark ==
The Boston Blues and Boston Reds teams hosted home minor league games at the South End Grounds. Located at Gainsborough Street, Huntington Avenue, Walpole Street and Columbus Avenue in Boston, the South End Grounds was the home to the National League Boston Braves. The ballpark had dimensions of (Left, Center, Right): 250–450–255. The original South End Grounds grandstand burnt down in 1894 and was immediately rebuilt. Overall, baseball was played at South End Grounds for 43 seasons.

== Timeline ==
Year(s)	# Yrs.	Team	Level	League	Ballpark
1884	1	Boston Reserves	Independent	Massachusetts State Association	South End Grounds
1886-1887	2	Boston Blues	Independent	New England League	South End Grounds
1893	1	Boston Reds	Independent	New England League	South End Grounds

== Notable alumni ==
- John Ake (1886)
- Marty Barrett (1884)
- Dick Burns (1886)
- Kid Butler (1886)
- Charlie Cady (1886)
- John Connor (1884)
- Jim Cudworth (1893)
- Fred Doe (1887)
- Ed Dugan (1887)
- Howard Earl (1886)
- Dennis Fitzgerald (1886)
- Ed Flanagan (1887)
- Gid Gardner (1887)
- Chummy Gray (1893)
- Tom Gunning (1884)
- Pat Hartnett (1886)
- Bill Hawes (1893)
- Mike Hines (1884)
- Jerry Hurley (1884)
- Mike Jordan (1887)
- John Kiley (1886)
- Dan Lally (1887)
- Dan Mahoney (1887)
- Jack Manning (1887)
- Jim Manning (1884)
- Pat McCauley (1893)
- Jerry McCormick (1886)
- Bill McGunnigle (1893, MGR)
- Frank McLaughlin (1886)
- William McLaughlin (1886)
- Gene Moriarty (1884)
- George Moolic (1887)
- Henry Mullin (1886)
- Morgan Murphy (1886-1887)
- Willie Murphy (1886)
- Cyclone Ryan (1886)
- Edgar Smith (1887)
- Tom Smith (1893)
- Marty Sullivan (1886)
- Gene Vadeboncoeur (1886)
- George Wetzel (1886)
- Art Whitney (1893)

== See also ==
- Boston Blues players
- Boston Reds (minor league) players
- Boston Reserves players
