= 1884 New York Gothams season =

1884 New York Gothams
- League: National League
- Ballpark: Polo Grounds
- City: New York City
- Record: 62–50 (.554)
- League place: 4th
- Owners: John B. Day
- Managers: Jim Price, John Montgomery Ward

The 1884 New York Gothams season was the second season of that baseball franchise, eventually known as the San Francisco Giants. The team finished in fourth place, 22 games behind the pennant-winning Providence Grays.

== Regular season ==
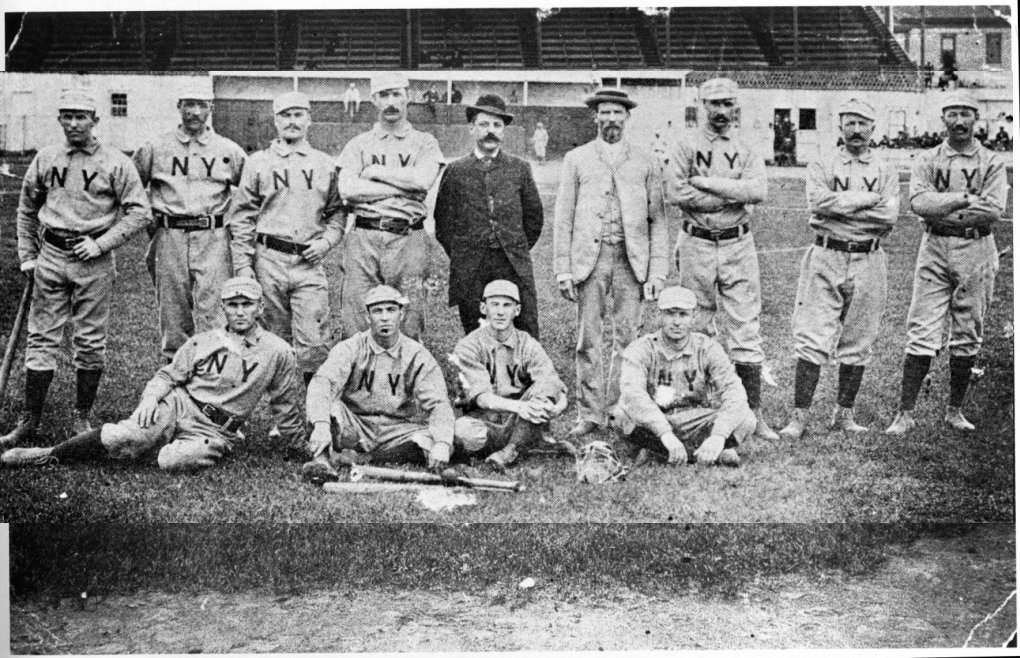
1884 New York Gothams team photo

=== Season standings ===
National League
| Team | W | L | Pct. | GB | Home | Road |
|---|---|---|---|---|---|---|
| Providence Grays | 84 | 28 | .750 | — | 45‍–‍11 | 39‍–‍17 |
| Boston Beaneaters | 73 | 38 | .658 | 10½ | 40‍–‍16 | 33‍–‍22 |
| Buffalo Bisons | 64 | 47 | .577 | 19½ | 37‍–‍18 | 27‍–‍29 |
| New York Gothams | 62 | 50 | .554 | 22 | 34‍–‍22 | 28‍–‍28 |
| Chicago White Stockings | 62 | 50 | .554 | 22 | 39‍–‍17 | 23‍–‍33 |
| Philadelphia Quakers | 39 | 73 | .348 | 45 | 19‍–‍37 | 20‍–‍36 |
| Cleveland Blues | 35 | 77 | .312 | 49 | 22‍–‍34 | 13‍–‍43 |
| Detroit Wolverines | 28 | 84 | .250 | 56 | 18‍–‍38 | 10‍–‍46 |

=== Record vs. opponents ===
1884 National League record Sources:
| Team | BSN | BUF | CHI | CLE | DET | NYG | PHI | PRO |
|---|---|---|---|---|---|---|---|---|
| Boston | — | 9–6–2 | 10–6 | 14–2 | 12–4–1 | 8–8–1 | 13–3 | 7–9–1 |
| Buffalo | 6–9–2 | — | 10–6–1 | 14–2 | 12–4 | 5–11–1 | 11–5 | 6–10 |
| Chicago | 6–10 | 6–10–1 | — | 8–8 | 11–5 | 12–4 | 14–2 | 5–11 |
| Cleveland | 2–14 | 2–14 | 8–8 | — | 9–7 | 5–11 | 6–10–1 | 3–13 |
| Detroit | 4–12–1 | 4–12 | 5–11 | 7–9 | — | 2–14–1 | 5–11 | 1–15 |
| New York | 8–8–1 | 11–5–1 | 4–12 | 11–5 | 14–2–1 | — | 11–5 | 3–13–1 |
| Philadelphia | 3–13 | 5–11 | 2–14 | 10–6–1 | 11–5 | 5–11 | — | 3–13 |
| Providence | 9–7–1 | 10–6 | 11–5 | 13–3 | 15–1 | 13–3–1 | 13–3 | — |

=== Roster ===
1884 New York Gothams
Roster
| Pitchers: Ed Bagley; Jim Brown; Mickey Welch | Catchers: Buck Ewing; John Humphries; Bill Loughran; Charlie Manlove; Henry Oxley; Infielders: Ed Caskin; Roger Connor; Frank Hankinson; Alex McKinnon | Outfielders: Mike Dorgan; Pete Gillespie; Sandy Griffin; Danny Richardson; John Ward | Manager: Jim Price; John Ward |

== Player stats ==
=== Batting ===
==== Starters by position ====
Note: Pos = Position; G = Games played; AB = At bats; H = Hits; Avg. = Batting average; HR = Home runs; RBI = Runs batted in

| Pos | Player | G | AB | H | Avg. | HR | RBI |
|---|---|---|---|---|---|---|---|
| C | Buck Ewing | 94 | 382 | 106 | .277 | 3 | 41 |
| 1B | Alex McKinnon | 116 | 470 | 128 | .272 | 3 | 73 |
| 2B | Roger Connor | 116 | 477 | 151 | .317 | 4 | 82 |
| SS | Ed Caskin | 100 | 351 | 81 | .231 | 1 | 40 |
| 3B | Frank Hankinson | 105 | 389 | 90 | .231 | 2 | 43 |
| OF | Mike Dorgan | 83 | 341 | 94 | .276 | 1 | 48 |
| OF | Patrick Gillespie | 101 | 413 | 109 | .264 | 2 | 44 |
| OF | John Ward | 113 | 482 | 122 | .253 | 2 | 51 |

==== Other batters ====
Note: G = Games played; AB = At bats; H = Hits; Avg. = Batting average; HR = Home runs; RBI = Runs batted in

| Player | G | AB | H | Avg. | HR | RBI |
|---|---|---|---|---|---|---|
| Danny Richardson | 74 | 277 | 70 | .253 | 1 | 27 |
| John Humphries | 20 | 64 | 6 | .094 | 0 | 2 |
| Sandy Griffin | 16 | 62 | 11 | .177 | 0 | 6 |
| Bill Loughran | 9 | 29 | 3 | .103 | 0 | 3 |
| Charlie Manlove | 3 | 10 | 0 | .000 | 0 | 0 |
| Henry Oxley | 2 | 4 | 0 | .000 | 0 | 0 |

=== Pitching ===
==== Starting pitchers ====
Note: G = Games pitched; IP = Innings pitched; W = Wins; L = Losses; ERA = Earned run average; SO = Strikeouts

| Player | G | IP | W | L | ERA | SO |
|---|---|---|---|---|---|---|
| Mickey Welch | 65 | 557.1 | 39 | 21 | 2.50 | 345 |
| Ed Bagley | 31 | 266.0 | 12 | 18 | 4.16 | 104 |
| Mike Dorgan | 14 | 113.0 | 8 | 6 | 3.50 | 90 |
| Jim Brown | 1 | 9.0 | 0 | 1 | 5.00 | 2 |
| Buck Ewing | 1 | 8.0 | 0 | 1 | 1.13 | 3 |

==== Other pitchers ====
Note: G = Games pitched; IP = Innings pitched; W = Wins; L = Losses; ERA = Earned run average; SO = Strikeouts

| Player | G | IP | W | L | ERA | SO |
|---|---|---|---|---|---|---|
| John Ward | 9 | 60.2 | 3 | 3 | 3.41 | 23 |
