= 1884 Chicago White Stockings season =

1884 Chicago White Stockings
- League: National League
- Ballpark: Lakefront Park
- City: Chicago
- Record: 62–50 (.554)
- League place: 5th
- Owner: Albert Spalding
- Manager: Cap Anson

The 1884 Chicago White Stockings season was the 13th season of the Chicago White Stockings franchise, the ninth in the National League and the seventh at Lakefront Park. The White Stockings finished fifth in the National League with a record of 62–50. White Stocking third baseman, Ned Williamson set the then major league single season home run record with 27 home runs. After hitting just 13 home runs in 1883, the White Stockings hit 142, the first time that a team had hit 100+ home runs in a season.

== Regular season ==
=== Season standings ===
National League
Team	W	L	Pct.	GB	Home	Road
Providence Grays	84	28	.750	—	45‍–‍11	39‍–‍17
Boston Beaneaters	73	38	.658	10½	40‍–‍16	33‍–‍22
Buffalo Bisons	64	47	.577	19½	37‍–‍18	27‍–‍29
New York Gothams	62	50	.554	22	34‍–‍22	28‍–‍28
Chicago White Stockings	62	50	.554	22	39‍–‍17	23‍–‍33
Philadelphia Quakers	39	73	.348	45	19‍–‍37	20‍–‍36
Cleveland Blues	35	77	.312	49	22‍–‍34	13‍–‍43
Detroit Wolverines	28	84	.250	56	18‍–‍38	10‍–‍46

=== Record vs. opponents ===
1884 National League record Sources:
Team	BSN	BUF	CHI	CLE	DET	NYG	PHI	PRO
Boston	—	9–6–2	10–6	14–2	12–4–1	8–8–1	13–3	7–9–1
Buffalo	6–9–2	—	10–6–1	14–2	12–4	5–11–1	11–5	6–10
Chicago	6–10	6–10–1	—	8–8	11–5	12–4	14–2	5–11
Cleveland	2–14	2–14	8–8	—	9–7	5–11	6–10–1	3–13
Detroit	4–12–1	4–12	5–11	7–9	—	2–14–1	5–11	1–15
New York	8–8–1	11–5–1	4–12	11–5	14–2–1	—	11–5	3–13–1
Philadelphia	3–13	5–11	2–14	10–6–1	11–5	5–11	—	3–13
Providence	9–7–1	10–6	11–5	13–3	15–1	13–3–1	13–3	—

== Roster ==
1884 Chicago White Stockings
Roster
Pitchers: Fred Andrus; John Clarkson; Larry Corcoran; Mike Corcoran; George Crosby; Fred Goldsmith; John Hibbard; Tom Lee; Thomas Lynch	Catchers: Silver Flint; Sy Sutcliffe; Infielders: Cap Anson; Tom Burns; Walt Kinzie; Fred Pfeffer; Ned Williamson	Outfielders: Joe Brown; Abner Dalrymple; George Gore; King Kelly; Billy Sunday	Manager: Cap Anson

== Player stats ==
=== Batting ===
==== Starters by position ====
Note: Pos = Position; G = Games played; AB = At bats; H = Hits; Avg. = Batting average; HR = Home runs; RBI = Runs batted in

Pos	Player	G	AB	H	Avg.	HR	RBI
C	Silver Flint	73	279	57	.204	9	45
1B	Cap Anson	112	475	159	.335	21	102
2B	Fred Pfeffer	112	467	135	.289	25	101
3B	Ned Williamson	107	417	116	.278	27	84
SS	Tom Burns	83	343	84	.245	7	44
OF	Abner Dalrymple	111	521	161	.309	22	69
OF	George Gore	103	422	134	.318	5	34
OF	King Kelly	108	452	160	.354	13	95

==== Other batters ====
Note: G = Games played; AB = At bats; H = Hits; Avg. = Batting average; HR = Home runs; RBI = Runs batted in

Player	G	AB	H	Avg.	HR	RBI
Billy Sunday	43	176	39	.222	4	28
Walt Kinzie	19	82	13	.159	2	8
Joe Brown	15	61	13	.213	0	3
Sy Sutcliffe	4	15	3	.200	0	2

=== Pitching ===
==== Starting pitchers ====
Note: G = Games pitched; IP = Innings pitched; W = Wins; L = Losses; ERA = Earned run average; SO = Strikeouts

Player	G	IP	W	L	ERA	SO
Larry Corcoran	60	516.2	35	23	2.40	272
Fred Goldsmith	21	188.0	9	11	4.26	34
John Clarkson	14	118.0	10	3	2.14	102
Joe Brown	7	50.0	4	2	4.68	27
Tom Lee	5	45.1	1	4	3.77	14
George Crosby	3	28.0	1	2	3.54	11
John Hibbard	2	17.0	1	1	2.65	4
Fred Andrus	1	9.0	1	0	2.00	2
Mike Corcoran	1	9.0	0	1	4.00	2
Thomas Lynch	1	7.0	0	0	2.57	2

==== Relief pitchers ====
Note: G = Games pitched; W = Wins; L = Losses; SV = Saves; ERA = Earned run average; SO = Strikeouts

Player	G	W	L	SV	ERA	SO
King Kelly	2	0	1	0	8.44	1
Ned Williamson	2	0	0	0	18.00	0
Fred Pfeffer	1	0	0	0	9.00	0
Cap Anson	1	0	1	0	18.00	1
