= List of Providence Grays Opening Day starting pitchers =

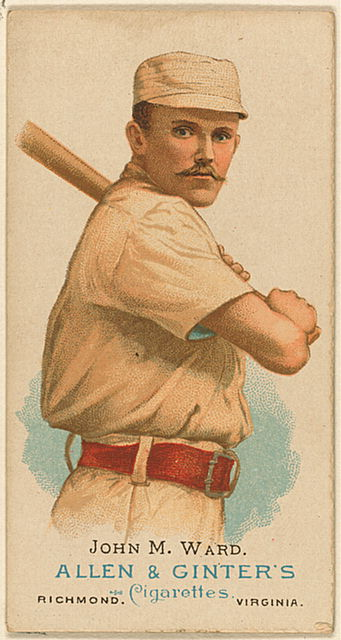
Monte Ward was the Providence Grays Opening Day starting pitcher four times.

The Providence Grays were a Major League Baseball team that was based in Providence, Rhode Island and played in the National League from 1878 through 1885. The Grays used four Opening Day starting pitchers in their eight years as a Major League Baseball franchise. The first game of the new baseball season for a team is played on Opening Day, and being named the Opening Day starter is an honor that is often given to the player who is expected to lead the pitching staff that season, though there are various strategic reasons why a team's best pitcher might not start on Opening Day. The Grays had a record of five wins and three losses in their Opening Day games.

The first game in Providence Grays history was played on May 1, 1878 against the Boston Red Caps (now known as the Atlanta Braves). Fred Corey was the Opening Day starting pitcher in that game, which the Grays lost by a score of 1–0. The Grays' last Opening Day game was played on May 2, 1885 against the Philadelphia Phillies. Charles Radbourn was the Grays' Opening Day starting pitcher in that game, which the Grays won by a score of 8–2.

Four pitchers made Opening Day starts for the Grays. Baseball Hall of Famer Monte Ward made four Opening Day starts in the Grays' eight seasons. Radbourne, also a Baseball Hall of Famer, made two Opening Day starts for the Grays. Thus, in six of the Grays' eight seasons (75%), the Grays' Opening Day starting pitcher was a Baseball Hall of Famer. Corey and Charlie Sweeney each made one Opening Day start for the Grays.

In their history, the Grays won two National League championships, in 1879 and in 1884. In 1884, the Grays went on to win the 19th century version of the World Series. In both years, the Grays' Opening Day opponent was the Cleveland Blues. In 1879, Ward was the Grays' Opening Day starting pitcher, in a game the Grays won by a score of 15–4. In 1884, Radbourn – who was the Grays' Opening Day starting pitcher in both 1883 and 1885 – started 73 of the Grays 114 games. However, the Grays Opening Day starting pitcher in 1884 was Sweeney, not Radbourn. The Grays lost their Opening Day game that year by a score of 2–1.

== Key ==
Season	Each year is linked to an article about that particular Grays season.
W	Win
L	Loss
T	Tie game
ND (W)	No decision by starting pitcher; Grays won game
ND (L)	No decision by starting pitcher; Grays lost game
(W)	Grays won game; no information on starting pitcher's decision
(L)	Grays lost game; no information on starting pitcher's decision
Final score	Game score with Grays runs listed first
Location	Stadium in italics for home game
(#)	Number of appearances as Opening Day starter with the Grays
**	Grays were National League Champions
†	Grays were World Series Champions

== Pitchers ==
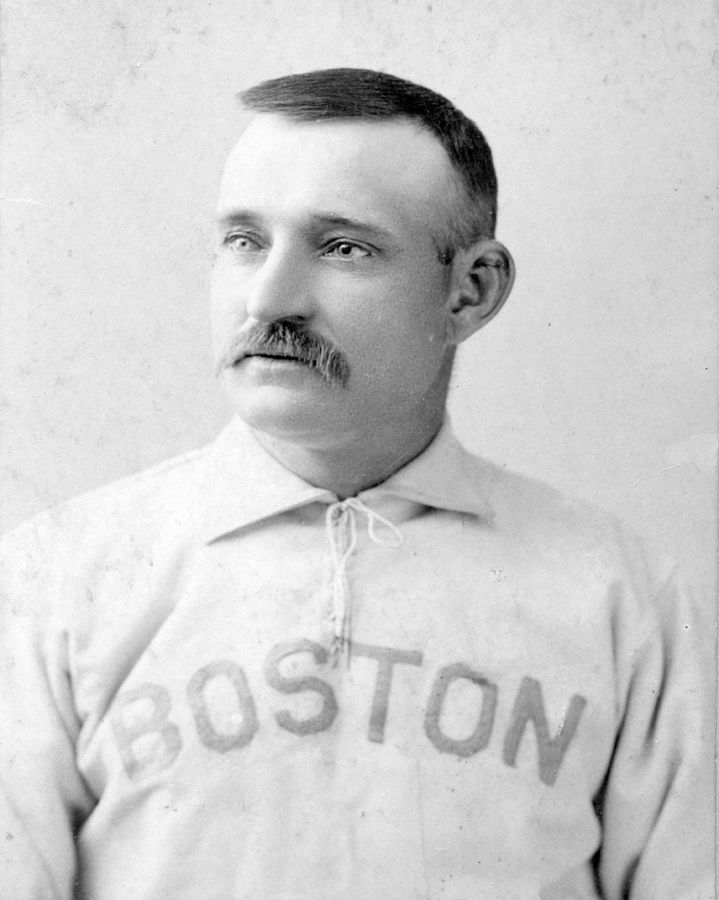
Charles Radbourn, shown with the Boston Beaneaters, was the Grays Opening Day starting pitcher twice.

Season	Pitcher	Decision	Final Score	Opponent	Location (Stadium)	References
1878	Fred Corey	(L)	0–1	Boston Red Caps	Messer Street Grounds	
1879**	Monte Ward	(W)	15–4	Cleveland Blues	National League Park	
1880	Monte Ward (2)	(W)	8–0	Boston Red Caps	Messer Street Grounds	
1881	Monte Ward (3)	(L)	2–4	Boston Red Caps	Messer Street Grounds	
1882	Monte Ward (4)	(W)	9–3	Troy Trojans	Messer Street Grounds	
1883	Charles Radbourn	(W)	4–3	Philadelphia Phillies	Recreation Park	
1884†	Charlie Sweeney	(L)	1–2	Cleveland Blues	Messer Street Grounds	
1885	Charles Radbourn (2)	(W)	8–2	Philadelphia Phillies	Recreation Park	
