= 1884 Buffalo Bisons season =

1884 Buffalo Bisons
- League: National League
- Ballpark: Olympic Park
- City: Buffalo, New York
- Record: 64–47 (.577)
- League place: 3rd
- Manager: Jim O'Rourke

The 1884 Buffalo Bisons finished the season with a 64–47 record, good for third place in the National League.

== Regular season ==
=== Season standings ===
National League
Team	W	L	Pct.	GB	Home	Road
Providence Grays	84	28	.750	—	45‍–‍11	39‍–‍17
Boston Beaneaters	73	38	.658	10½	40‍–‍16	33‍–‍22
Buffalo Bisons	64	47	.577	19½	37‍–‍18	27‍–‍29
New York Gothams	62	50	.554	22	34‍–‍22	28‍–‍28
Chicago White Stockings	62	50	.554	22	39‍–‍17	23‍–‍33
Philadelphia Quakers	39	73	.348	45	19‍–‍37	20‍–‍36
Cleveland Blues	35	77	.312	49	22‍–‍34	13‍–‍43
Detroit Wolverines	28	84	.250	56	18‍–‍38	10‍–‍46

=== Record vs. opponents ===
1884 National League record Sources:
Team	BSN	BUF	CHI	CLE	DET	NYG	PHI	PRO
Boston	—	9–6–2	10–6	14–2	12–4–1	8–8–1	13–3	7–9–1
Buffalo	6–9–2	—	10–6–1	14–2	12–4	5–11–1	11–5	6–10
Chicago	6–10	6–10–1	—	8–8	11–5	12–4	14–2	5–11
Cleveland	2–14	2–14	8–8	—	9–7	5–11	6–10–1	3–13
Detroit	4–12–1	4–12	5–11	7–9	—	2–14–1	5–11	1–15
New York	8–8–1	11–5–1	4–12	11–5	14–2–1	—	11–5	3–13–1
Philadelphia	3–13	5–11	2–14	10–6–1	11–5	5–11	—	3–13
Providence	9–7–1	10–6	11–5	13–3	15–1	13–3–1	13–3	—

=== Roster ===
1884 Buffalo Bisons
Roster
Pitchers: Pud Galvin; Art Hagan; Billy Serad; Catchers: George Myers; Jack Rowe	Infielders: Dan Brouthers; Chub Collins; Davy Force; Hardy Richardson; Deacon White	Outfielders: Ed Coughlin; Dave Eggler; Bones Ely; Jim Lillie; Jim O'Rourke	Manager: Jim O'Rourke

== Player stats ==
=== Batting ===
==== Starters by position ====
Note: Pos = Position; G = Games played; AB = At bats; H = Hits; Avg. = Batting average; HR = Home runs; RBI = Runs batted in

Pos	Player	G	AB	H	Avg.	HR	RBI
C	Jack Rowe	93	400	126	.315	4	61
1B	Dan Brouthers	94	398	130	.327	14	79
2B	Hardy Richardson	102	439	132	.301	6	60
3B	Deacon White	110	452	147	.325	5	74
SS	Davy Force	106	403	83	.206	0	36
OF	Dave Eggler	63	241	47	.195	0	20
OF	Jim O'Rourke	108	467	162	.347	5	63
OF	Jim Lillie	114	471	105	.223	3	53

==== Other batters ====
Note: G = Games played; AB = At bats; H = Hits; Avg. = Batting average; HR = Home runs; RBI = Runs batted in

Player	G	AB	H	Avg.	HR	RBI
George Myers	78	325	59	.182	2	32
Chub Collins	45	169	30	.178	1	20
Bones Ely	1	4	0	.000	0	0
Ed Coughlin	1	4	1	.250	0	1

=== Pitching ===
==== Starting pitchers ====
Note: G = Games pitched; IP = Innings pitched; W = Wins; L = Losses; ERA = Earned run average; SO = Strikeouts

Player	G	IP	W	L	ERA	SO
Pud Galvin	72	636.1	46	22	1.99	369
Billy Serad	37	308.0	16	20	4.27	150
Art Hagan	3	26.0	1	2	5.88	4
Bones Ely	1	5.0	0	1	14.40	4

==== Other pitchers ====
Note: G = Games pitched; IP = Innings pitched; W = Wins; L = Losses; ERA = Earned run average; SO = Strikeouts

Player	G	IP	W	L	ERA	SO
Jim Lillie	2	13.0	0	1	6.23	4

==== Relief pitchers ====
Note: G = Games pitched; W = Wins; L = Losses; SV = Saves; ERA = Earned run average; SO = Strikeouts

Player	G	W	L	SV	ERA	SO
Jim O'Rourke	4	0	1	1	2.84	3
Ed Coughlin	1	0	0	0	∞	0
