= Ed Conley =

American baseball player (1864–1894)

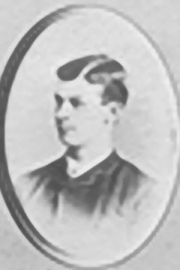
- Pitcher
- Born: July 10, 1864; Sandwich, Massachusetts, U.S.
- Died: October 16, 1894 (aged 30); Cumberland, Rhode Island, U.S.
- Batted: Unknown Threw: Unknown

MLB debut
- July 20, 1884, for the Providence Grays

Last MLB appearance
- October 9, 1884, for the Providence Grays

MLB statistics
- Games pitched: 8
- Win–loss record: 4–4
- Earned run average: 2.15
- Stats at Baseball Reference

Teams
- Providence Grays (1884)

Edward J. Conley (July 10, 1864 – October 16, 1894) was an American professional baseball player who pitched in Major League Baseball for the 1884 Providence Grays. He pitched in eight games and had a win–loss record of 4–4 with a 2.15 earned run average in 71 innings pitched.

Born in Sandwich, Massachusetts, Conley attended the College of the Holy Cross, where he was known as a skilled baseball player. In 1884, he was playing for a semi-pro team in Woonsocket, Rhode Island when he was signed by the Grays to fill in for suspended Baseball Hall of Famer Charles "Old Hoss" Radbourn. After winning the 1884 championship with the Grays, he played for the minor league Bridgeport Giants in 1885, and for the Haverhill team of the New England League in 1886. He died at the age of 30 of Phthisis pulmonalis (tuberculosis) in Cumberland, Rhode Island. He is interred at Mount Calvary Cemetery in Cumberland.
