= George Wood (baseball) =

Canadian baseball player and manager (1858–1924)

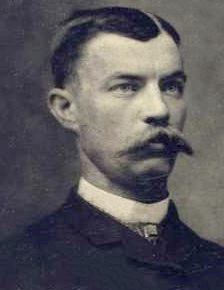
- Outfielder
- Born: November 9, 1858; Pownal, Prince Edward Island, British North America
- Died: April 4, 1924 (aged 65); Harrisburg, Pennsylvania, U.S.
- Batted: Left Threw: Right

MLB debut
- May 1, 1880, for the Worcester Ruby Legs

Last MLB appearance
- September 29, 1892, for the Cincinnati Reds

MLB statistics
- Batting average: .273
- Home runs: 68
- Runs batted in: 601
- Stats at Baseball Reference
- Managerial record at Baseball Reference

Teams
- As player: Worcester Ruby Legs (1880); Detroit Wolverines (1881–1885); Philadelphia Quakers (NL) (1886–1889); Baltimore Orioles (1889); Philadelphia Athletics (1890–1891); Baltimore Orioles (1892); Cincinnati Reds (1892); As manager: Philadelphia Athletics (1891)

Career highlights and awards
- NL home run leader (1882)

Member of the Canadian

Baseball Hall of Fame
- Induction: 2011

George Albert Wood (November 9, 1858 – April 4, 1924), also known as "Dandy" Wood, was a British North American-born professional baseball player and manager whose career spanned from 1878 to 1896. He played 13 seasons of Major League Baseball, primarily as an outfielder, for the Worcester Ruby Legs (1880), Detroit Wolverines (1881–85), Philadelphia Quakers (1886–89), Philadelphia Athletics (1890–91), Baltimore Orioles (1889, 1892), and Cincinnati Reds (1892). In 1891, he served as both a player and the manager of the Athletics.

== Early years ==
Wood was born in Pownal, Prince Edward Island, British North America, in 1858. He was the son of Joseph A. Wood and Mary Ann Jenkins and is believed to be the first major league player from Prince Edward Island, and one of only three in major league history, along with Henry Oxley and Vern Handrahan. Wood moved with his family to East Boston as a child in 1867.

== Professional baseball career ==
=== Worcester ===
Wood began his professional baseball career in 1878 and 1879 playing for teams in Worcester, Massachusetts, and Manchester, New Hampshire. His batting average in 1879 was .368. In December 1879, he travelled to Havana as the left fielder of the first American team to play a Cuban all-star team.

In 1880, the Worcester baseball club became known as the Worcester Ruby Legs and was admitted to the National League. Wood made his major league debut with Worcester on May 1, 1880. On May 7, 1880, he initiated a triple play. Wood appeared in 81 of 83 games in Worcester's inaugural major league season, with 80 of those games being as an outfielder. Playing against National League competition, Wood's batting average dropped from .368 in 1879 to .245 in 1880. Wood played well defensively, however, and his .887 fielding percentage was the fifth highest among all of the league's outfielders.

=== Integrated baseball ===
Wood also participated in an early integrated baseball game. The Chicago Tribune reported on the game as follows: "A very singular contest took place at New Orleans‚ La.‚ on April 4‚ 1880‚ when five Northern professionals succeeded in defeating the colored professional nine of that city by a score of 17 to 3." According to the account reported 14 months later in the Chicago Tribune of July 1881‚ Tim Keefe pitched‚ Charlie Bennett caught‚ John Sullivan played first base‚ while Wood and George Creamer "were entrusted with the onerous task of filling the other six positions."

=== Detroit ===
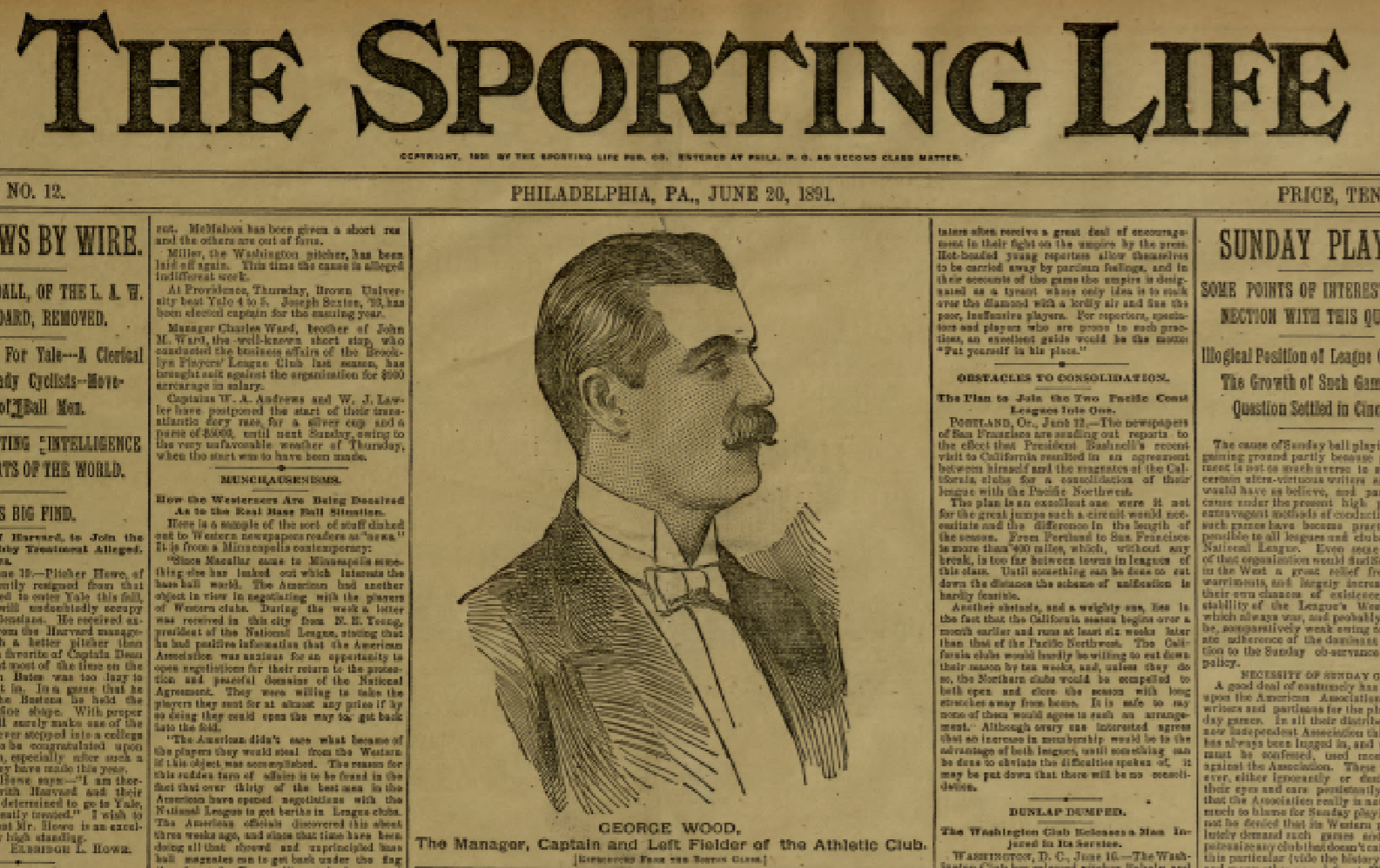
Wood on front page of The Sporting Life, June 20, 1891

In 1881, the National League admitted a new club in Detroit, Michigan, which became known as the Detroit Wolverines. Frank Bancroft, who had been Wood's manager in Worcester, was hired as the manager of the new club, and Wood quickly agreed to join Bancroft in Detroit. Wood joined the Wolverines for their inaugural season in 1881 and remained a starter for the club through the 1885 season.

On May 2, 1881, Wood hit a triple, scored a run, and turned a double play in the first major league baseball game ever played in Detroit. By the end of the 1881 season, Wood ranked among the National League leaders with nine triples (3rd), 29 extra base hits (8th), 142 total bases (9th), 100 hits (10th), and a .421 slugging percentage (10th). The following year, in 1882, Wood was the National League's home run champion with seven home runs and ranked second in the league with 12 triples. He also led the league's outfielders with eight double plays turned from the outfield and ranked fifth among the league's outfielders with an .884 fielding percentage. Wood's eight double plays in 1882 tied Ned Hanlon for the major league record.

Wood had the best season of his career in 1883. That year, he compiled a .302 batting average with 26 doubles, 11 triples, five home runs, and 47 RBIs. He also showed range in the outfield and led the league's outfielders with 226 outfield putouts. Applying the sabermetric measure of Wins Above Replacement (WAR), Wood's performance in 1883 rated a 3.3, the highest of his career. He continued to have strong seasons in 1884 and 1885 with WAR ratings of 2.1 and 2.4. He would rate above a 2.0 WAR rating only one other time in his career—a 2.8 rating in 1891. On June 12, 1885, Wood became the third player in National League history (and the eighth in any major league) to hit for the cycle.

=== Philadelphia ===
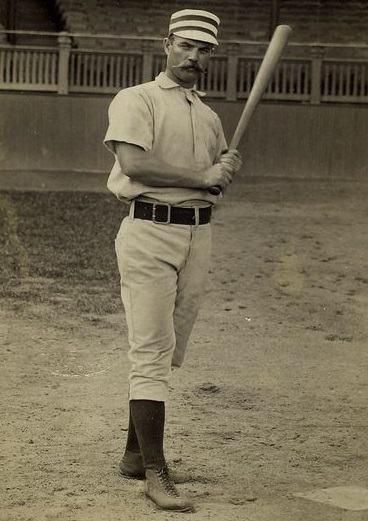
Wood as a Philadelphia Quaker, c. 1886-89

In November 1885, Wood was returned to the control of the National League and was claimed in January 1886 by the Philadelphia Quakers. Wood played four seasons for the Quakers from 1886 to 1889, compiling a .262 batting average with 80 doubles, 44 triples, 29 home runs, 220 RBIs and 65 stolen bases. Wood was released by the Quakers on September 24, 1889, and appeared in three games for the Baltimore Orioles in the final week of the season. On opening day in 1887, he hit the first home run at the new Philadelphia ball park dubbed the Baker Bowl.

During the winter after the 1888 season, Wood was part of the All-America baseball team that travelled around the world playing a series of games against the Chicago White Stockings. The teams played games in Hawaii, New Zealand, Australia, Ceylon, Egypt, Italy, France, England, and Ireland and met with President Benjamin Harrison at the White House when they returned to the United States in April 1889.

In 1890, Wood jumped to the Players' League, playing for the Philadelphia Athletics. Wood compiled a .289 batting average with 20 doubles, 14 triples, nine home runs, 102 RBIs, and 20 stolen bases in the Players' League. He also led the league with 35 outfield assists.

The Players' League disbanded after the 1890 season, but the Philadelphia club was admitted to the American Association. Wood stayed with the club and also served as the team's manager in 1891. He led the team to 67–55 record and batted for a career high .309 average, eighth best in the league. He was also among the league's leaders with 14 triples, (8th), 242 times on base (8th), and a .399 on-base percentage (9th).

=== Baltimore and Cincinnati ===
The 1892 season was Wood's last in the major leagues. He played parts of the season for both the Baltimore Orioles (21 games) and the Cincinnati Reds (30 games).

== Later years ==
After his playing career was over, Wood served as an umpire for a time. He died in 1924 at Harrisburg, Pennsylvania, at age 65. He has been posthumously inducted into the PEI Sports Hall of Fame (2009) and the Canadian Baseball Hall of Fame (2011).

== See also ==
- List of Major League Baseball career triples leaders
- List of Major League Baseball annual home run leaders
- List of Major League Baseball annual saves leaders
- List of Major League Baseball players to hit for the cycle
- List of Major League Baseball player-managers

Sporting positions
Preceded by Bill Sharsig	Philadelphia Athletics (PL/AA) Managers; 1891	Succeeded by League folded
Achievements
Preceded by Dave Orr	Hitting for the cycle June 13, 1885	Succeeded by Henry Larkin
