= 1884 World Series =

Pre-modern baseball championship

1884 World's Championship Series
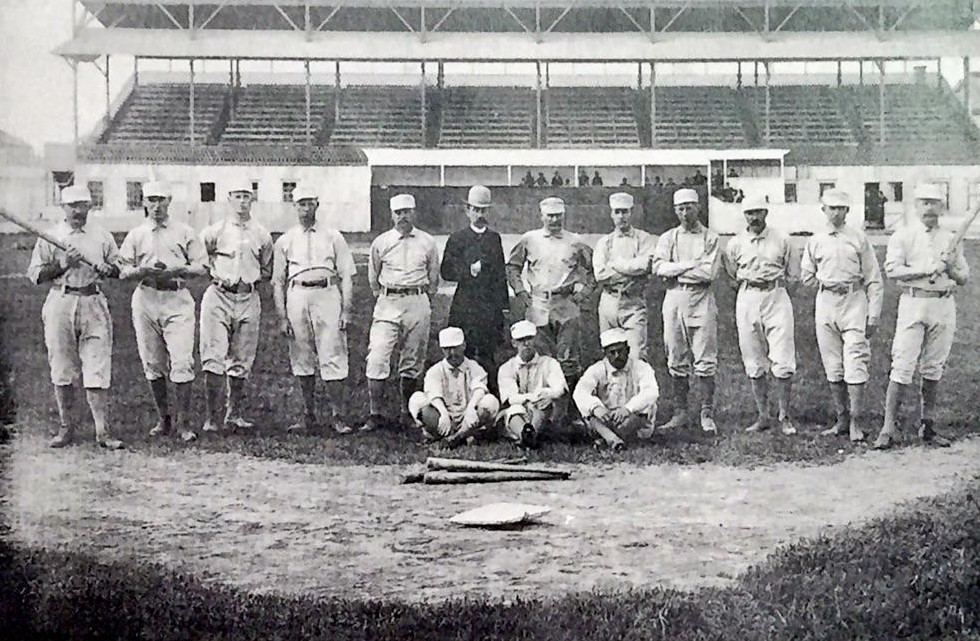
- 1884 World Series champion Providence Grays
Team (Wins)	Manager(s)	Season
Providence Grays (3)	Frank Bancroft	84–28–2 (.746), GA: 10½
New York Metropolitans (0)	Jim Mutrie	75–32–5 (.692), GA: 6½
- Dates: October 23–25
- Venue(s): Messer Street Grounds (Providence); Polo Grounds (New York)

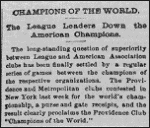
1884 championship series news clipping

In baseball, the 1884 World Series was a post-season championship series between the Providence Grays of the National League and the New York Metropolitans of the American Association at the Polo Grounds in New York City.

While the 1884 post-season championship series was the first such to be referred to as the "World's Championship Series," or the "World's Series," Major League Baseball considers the 1903 World Series the first. Nonetheless, the 1884 series was baseball's first inter-league championship contest.

== History ==
In 1884, Metropolitans manager Jim Mutrie issued a challenge to his NL counterpart, Frank Bancroft of the Grays. Mutrie's challenge was for a best-of-three series. Each team would put up a thousand dollars with the winner taking all.

This pre-modern-era World Series would feature a pitching match-up of future Hall of Famers and 300-game winners Charles "Old Hoss" Radbourn and Tim Keefe. That was the year Radbourn won his season-record 59 games (some sources say 60) for the Grays. Keefe was a "mere" 37–17. Playing under American Association rules, Radbourn and the Grays defeated the New York team in the first two games, 6–0 and 3–1.

Only the first game went the full nine innings; the others were called after seven and six, because of darkness and extreme cold, respectively. The third game arguably should never have been played as the format was best-of-three, and Providence clinched in two. It was played with the hope of generating further revenue.

The crowd for the third game comprised only 300 people due to bitter cold. The Grays did not want to play due to the weather but were given the option of choosing the umpire if they would play. The Grays accepted and strategically chose Keefe, the Mets best pitcher. Radbourn, pitching his third complete game in three days, led the Grays to a 12–2 rout. For the series, Radbourn allowed 11 hits and no earned runs in 22 innings.

Local newspaper The New York Clipper called the series "The Championship of the United States." Several newspapers such as The Sporting Life penned the Grays as "World Champions", and the new title stuck.

The total attendance for the three games was 3,800. Despite the low attendance, the two leagues continued the series, and attendance and prize money increased each of the next two years.

== The World Series of 1884 ==
Providence Grays (NL) (84–28) vs New York Metropolitans (AA) (75–32)

=== Game one ===
Thursday, October 23, at the Polo Grounds.

Providence defeats New York 6–0

Umpire: John Kelly

Time of game: 2:00

W: Old Hoss Radbourn (1–0)

L: Tim Keefe (0-1)

=== Game two ===
Friday, October 24, at the Polo Grounds

Providence defeats New York 3–1 (7 innings)

Umpire: John Remsen

Time of game: 1:35

W: Old Hoss Radbourn (2–0)

L: Tim Keefe (0-2)

=== Game three ===
Saturday, October 25, at the Polo Grounds

Providence defeats New York 12–2 (6 innings)

Umpire: Tim Keefe

Time of game: 1:20

W: Old Hoss Radbourn (3–0)

L: Buck Becannon (0-1)

== See also ==
- List of pre-World Series baseball champions
