= Bill Annis =

American baseball player (1857–1923)

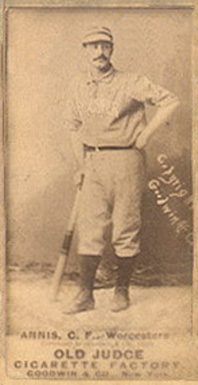
- Outfielder
- Born: May 24, 1857; Stoneham, Massachusetts, U.S.
- Died: June 10, 1923 (aged 66); Kennebunkport, Maine, U.S.
- Batted: Right Threw: Unknown

MLB debut
- May 1, 1884, for the Boston Beaneaters

Last MLB appearance
- August 8, 1884, for the Boston Beaneaters

MLB statistics
- Batting average: .177
- Home runs: 0
- Runs batted in: 3
- Stats at Baseball Reference

Teams
- Boston Beaneaters (1884)

William Perley Annis (May 24, 1857– June 10, 1923) was a 19th-century American Major League Baseball outfielder. He played for the 1884 Boston Beaneaters. He continued to play baseball in the minor leagues through 1892.

== Career ==
Annis made his professional baseball debut in 1883, playing for the Pottsville Anthracites of the Interstate Association.

In 1884, he played for both the Boston Reserves of the Massachusetts State Association and the Boston Beaneaters of the National League. He played in 27 games as an outfielder for the Beaneaters, collecting 17 hits in 96 at bats. Annis finished with a .177 batting average.

Annis played for several minor league teams from 1885 to 1892.

== Personal life ==
He was the son of Perley Mason Annis, a shoe maker, and Rozilla E. Coburn. He was married twice, and had no children.

He died on June 10, 1923, and was buried at Lindenwood Cemetery in Stoneham, Massachusetts.
