= Alex Gardner (baseball) =

Canadian baseball player (1861–1926)

- Catcher
- Born: April 28, 1861; Toronto, Ontario, Canada
- Died: June 18, 1926 (aged 65); Danvers, Massachusetts, US
- Batted: Right Threw: Right

MLB debut
- May 10, 1884, for the Washington Nationals

Last MLB appearance
- May 10, 1884, for the Washington Nationals (AA)

MLB statistics
- Batting average: .000
- Home runs: 0
- Runs batted in: 0
- Stats at Baseball Reference

Teams
- Washington Nationals (1884)

Alexander Gardner (April 28, 1861 – June 18, 1926) was a Canadian professional baseball catcher who played one major league game for the Washington Nationals of the American Association in 1884.

Gardner started his only game on May 10, 1884, and caught Ed Trumbull, who was also making his first major league start, in a matchup against the New York Metropolitans. Gardner, who lived in Danvers, Massachusetts, may have been recommended to the team by fellow resident Thorny Hawkes. At the plate, Gardner recorded no hits in three at bats. He also played poorly in the field, committing six errors and allowing at least six passed balls (some sources credit him with 12 passed balls, which would be an all-time major league record). Washington lost the game, which was stopped after only seven innings, by a score of 11-3; reportedly, a thousand fans left the ballpark in disgust midway through the game.

Gardner most likely lived in Danvers for the remainder of his life, and died there in 1926 at the age of 65.
