= Vern Handrahan =

Canadian baseball player (1936–2016)

- Pitcher
- Born: November 27, 1936; Charlottetown, Prince Edward Island
- Died: November 2, 2016 (aged 79); Charlottetown, Prince Edward Island
- Batted: Left Threw: Right

MLB debut
- April 14, 1964, for the Kansas City Athletics

Last MLB appearance
- September 21, 1966, for the Kansas City Athletics

MLB statistics
- Win–loss record: 0–2
- Earned run average: 5.31
- Strikeouts: 36
- Stats at Baseball Reference

Teams
- Kansas City Athletics (1964, 1966)

Member of the Canadian

Baseball Hall of Fame
- Induction: 2021

James Vernon Handrahan (November 27, 1936 – November 2, 2016) was a Canadian professional baseball pitcher who played for the Kansas City Athletics of Major League Baseball (MLB) in 1964 and 1966. He is noted for being one of only three major-league players from Prince Edward Island, the others being 19th-century outfielder George Wood and catcher Henry Oxley.

== Biography ==
Handrahan threw right-handed, batted left-handed, and was listed as 6 feet 2 inches (1.88 m) tall and 185 pounds (84 kg). He was originally signed by the Milwaukee Braves as a 22-year-old amateur in 1959. After playing sandlot and youth baseball in his native Charlottetown, then pitching in a semi-professional league for Stellarton, Nova Scotia, in the heart of that province's coal mining country, he was signed by veteran Braves scout Lucius "Jeff" Jones, whose territory encompassed New England and Atlantic Canada.

Handrahan spent four years at the lower levels of the Braves' farm system before the Athletics selected him in the 1962 minor league draft. He made the Kansas City roster out of spring training in 1964, and worked in 18 games between April 14 and June 9. Sent to Triple-A, he didn't return to the majors until Kansas City recalled him in the middle of 1966 for a 16-game audition. Handrahan made two starts for the Athletics, one in 1964 and the other in 1966, and they resulted in both of his MLB decisions: defeats at the hands of the Los Angeles Angels on May 5, 1964, and the Chicago White Sox on April 17, 1966. He earned his only major-league save in his penultimate MLB appearance when he worked a scoreless one-third of an inning against the Cleveland Indians to complete a 1–0 Kansas City triumph on September 15, 1966.

Handrahan returned to minor league baseball in 1967 for the remainder of his 12-season career. During his MLB service—34 games (32 in relief)—Handrahan compiled an 0–2 won–lost record and an earned run average of 5.31. In 61 innings pitched, he permitted 53 hits and 40 bases on balls, and struck out 36.

Handrahan was elected to the Prince Edward Island Sports Hall of Fame in its first year, 1968, but could not attend the induction ceremony because he was pitching across the country for the Triple-A Vancouver Mounties at the time.

He died in Charlottetown on November 2, 2016.

Handrahan was inducted into the Canadian Baseball Hall of Fame in 2021.
