= Ed Trumbull =

American baseball player (1860–1937)

- Outfielder/Pitcher
- Born: November 3, 1860; Chicopee, Massachusetts, U.S.
- Died: January 14, 1937 (aged 76); Kingston, Pennsylvania, U.S.
- Batted: Unknown Threw: Unknown

MLB debut
- May 10, 1884, for the Washington Nationals

Last MLB appearance
- July 28, 1884, for the Washington Nationals

MLB statistics
- Batting average: .116
- Home runs: 0
- Runs batted in: 0
- Win–loss record: 1–9
- Earned run average: 4.71
- Strikeouts: 43
- Stats at Baseball Reference

Teams
- Washington Nationals (1884)

Ed Trumbull (born Edward J. Trembly, November 3, 1860 – January 14, 1937) was an American professional baseball outfielder and pitcher who played for the Washington Nationals of the American Association in 1884.

According to the Washington Post, Trumbull was of French-Canadian descent and worked as a molder. David Nemec states that he was "better at billiards than baseball" and speculates that he was left-handed based on how newspaper accounts describe the movement of his breaking pitches.

Trumbull made his major league debut on May 10, 1884, against the New York Metropolitans. He was caught by Alex Gardner, who set a major league record by allowing 12 passed balls and also made six errors; the pitcher may have been partially at fault, as his delivery was described as wild and swift. Trumbull took the loss in the game, an 11–3 defeat for Washington which was stopped after seven innings; many fans left midway through the game. He started nine more games for Washington and won only one, a 10–4 victory against the Toledo Blue Stockings on June 7. The team folded in August, and Trumbull moved on to play for Holyoke of the minor league Massachusetts State Association.

In 1885, Trumbull pitched in one minor league game for Springfield of the Southern New England League. In 1896, he played for a semi-professional team in Springfield, Massachusetts formed by Robert M. Keating.
