= John Cattanach =

American baseball player (1863–1926)

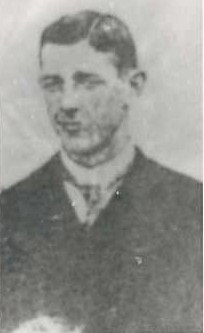
- Pitcher
- Born: May 10, 1863; Providence, Rhode Island, U.S.
- Died: November 10, 1926 (aged 63); Providence, Rhode Island, U.S.
- Batted: Unknown Threw: Unknown

MLB debut
- June 5, 1884, for the Providence Grays

Last MLB appearance
- July 17, 1884, for the St. Louis Maroons

MLB statistics
- Games pitched: 3
- Win–loss record: 1–1
- Earned run average: 3.68
- Stats at Baseball Reference

Teams
- Providence Grays (1884); St. Louis Maroons (1884)

John Leckie Cattanach (May 10, 1863 – November 10, 1926) was an American Major League Baseball player who pitched three games during his only season, 1884. He pitched in one game for the Providence Grays of the National League, and two other games for the St. Louis Maroons of the Union Association. He finished with a win–loss record of 1–1, with a 3.68 earned run average and 15 strikeouts in 22 innings pitched. After his baseball career, he became a well known boxer and oarsman, and in his father's business became a chemist. He died in his hometown of Providence, Rhode Island at the age of 63, and is interred at Oak Grove Cemetery in Pawtucket, Rhode Island.
