= Ed Bagley =

American baseball player (1863–1919)

- Pitcher
- Born: October 1863; New York City, U.S.
- Died: July 24, 1919 (aged 55); Waterbury, Connecticut, U.S.
- Batted: Unknown Threw: Unknown

MLB debut
- May 3, 1884, for the New York Gothams

Last MLB appearance
- July 4, 1885, for the New York Metropolitans

MLB statistics
- Win–loss record: 16–27
- Earned run average: 4.39
- Strikeouts: 148
- Stats at Baseball Reference

Teams
- New York Gothams (1884); New York Metropolitans (1885)

Edward H. Bagley (October, 1863 – July 24, 1919) was an American Major League Baseball (MLB) pitcher from 1884 to 1885.
