= John Humphries (baseball) =

Canadian-American baseball player (1861–1933)

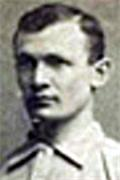
- Catcher/Outfielder
- Born: November 12, 1861; North Gower, Canada West
- Died: November 29, 1933 (aged 72); Salinas, California, U.S.
- Batted: Left Threw: Left

MLB debut
- July 2, 1883, for the New York Gothams

Last MLB appearance
- August 1, 1884, for the Washington Nationals

MLB statistics
- Batting average: .143
- Hits: 52
- Runs batted in: 6
- Stats at Baseball Reference

Teams
- New York Gothams (1883–1884); Washington Nationals (1884)

John Henry Humphries (November 12, 1861 – November 29, 1933) was a Major League Baseball player who played for the New York Gothams and the Washington Nationals. Despite being left-handed, Humphries played catcher, a position dominated by right-handed players. He also played outfield and first base. Humphries was the father of the poet Rolfe Humphries, who mentioned him in his poem "Polo Grounds."

== Amateur career ==
=== College ===
Humphries attended Cornell University in Ithaca, New York. He was the first player from Cornell to play in Major League Baseball.

== Professional career ==
=== New York Gothams ===
At the age of 21, Humphries began his professional career with the New York Gothams. In his first season, 1883, Humphries hit .112 with 12 hits, one double and four RBIs in 29 games.

In 1884 Humphries batted only .094 with six hits and two RBIs in 20 games. In his two seasons with the Gothams, Humphries batted .105 with 18 hits, one double and six runs batted in and played in 49 games.

=== Washington Nationals ===
Humphries also played for the Washington Nationals in 1884. In 49 games with the Nationals he batted .176 with 23 runs, 34 hits, two doubles and nine walks.

He would continue to play baseball in Minor League Baseball for three seasons after playing for the Nationals. Humphries would also manage two teams in the Minors. The first was the Rochester Flour Cities in 1885 and the second was the Syracuse Stars in 1902.
