= George Crosby =

American baseball player (1857–1913)

- Pitcher
- Born: September 1, 1857; Lyons, Idaho, United States
- Died: January 9, 1913 (aged 55); San Francisco, California
- Batted: unknown Threw: Unknown

MLB debut
- May 22, 1884, for the Chicago White Stockings

Last MLB appearance
- May 30, 1884, for the Chicago White Stockings

MLB statistics
- Record: 1-2
- ERA: 3.54
- Strikeouts: 11

Teams
- Chicago White Stockings (1884)

George Washington Crosby (September 1, 1857 – January 9, 1913) was a Major League Baseball pitcher. He played for Chicago White Stockings in the 1884 season.
