= Bill Loughran =

American baseball player (1862–1917)

- Catcher
- Born: June 1862; New York City, U.S.
- Died: August 7, 1917 (aged 55); New York City, U.S.
- Batted: Unknown Threw: Unknown

MLB debut
- June 6, 1884, for the New York Gothams

Last MLB appearance
- August 28, 1884, for the New York Gothams

MLB statistics
- Batting average: .103
- Hits: 3
- Runs: 4
- Stats at Baseball Reference

Teams
- New York Gothams (1884)

William H. Loughran (June 1862 – August 7, 1917) was a 19th-century American Major League Baseball player who played catcher for the 1884 New York Gothams of the National League.
