= Thomas Lynch (pitcher) =

American baseball player (1863–1903)

- Pitcher / First baseman
- Born: 1863; Peru, Illinois, US
- Died: May 13, 1903 (aged 39–40); Peru, Illinois, US
- Batted: Left Threw: Unknown

MLB debut
- August 5, 1884, for the Chicago White Stockings

Last MLB appearance
- August 5, 1884, for the Chicago White Stockings

MLB statistics
- Games pitched: 1 (Note: Baseball records do not indicate winning and losing pitchers for the game that Lynch pitched in; while Lynch's team lost, he did not pitch the entire game (thus, may have had a no decision) and no box score is available.)
- Earned run average: 2.57
- Strikeouts: 2
- Stats at Baseball Reference

Teams
- Chicago White Stockings (1884)

Thomas S. Lynch (1863 – May 13, 1903) was an American professional baseball player. He played one game in the National League for the Chicago White Stockings (now known as the Chicago Cubs) during the 1884 season.

Lynch's sole appearance in a major league game occurred on August 5, 1884, when he pitched seven innings against the Cleveland Blues. He allowed four runs (two earned) on seven hits, while striking out two batters and walking three batters. He also played a part in of the game as the first baseman. Offensively, he had four at bats without recording a hit.

An uncorroborated letter to the editor in 1990 stated that Lynch was deaf (resulting in the nickname "Dummy") and attended Gallaudet University. A 1910 newspaper article recounted a past incident involving pitcher "Dummy" Lynch playing for a team from Danville, Illinois, along with John Grim. Grim was a contemporary of Thomas Lynch, adding some support to the 1990 letter.
