= Miah Murray =

American baseball player and umpire (1865–1922)

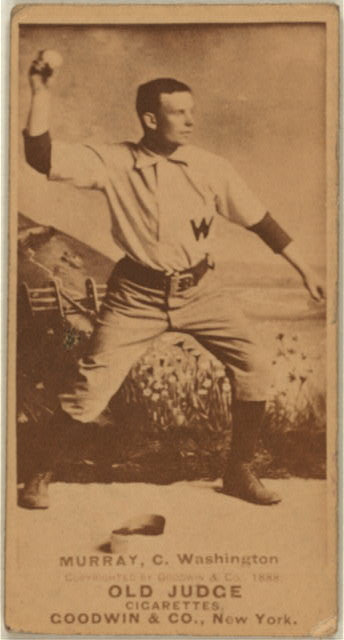
- Catcher / Umpire
- Born: January 1, 1865; Boston, Massachusetts, U.S.
- Died: January 11, 1922 (aged 57); Boston, Massachusetts, U.S.
- Batted: Right Threw: Right

MLB debut
- May 17, 1884, for the Providence Grays

Last MLB appearance
- October 3, 1891, for the Washington Senators

MLB statistics
- Batting average: .142
- Runs scored: 6
- Games played: 34
- Stats at Baseball Reference

Teams
- Providence Grays (1884); Louisville Colonels (1885); Washington Nationals (1888); Washington Statesmen (1891)

Jeremiah J. "Miah" Murray (January 1, 1865 – January 11, 1922) was an American catcher in Major League Baseball for four seasons, then umpired full-time for one season. In his career, he played with four different teams: the Providence Grays in 1884, the Louisville Colonels in 1885), the Washington Nationals in 1888, and the Washington Senators in 1891. His career totals include 34 games played, 120 at bats, and 17 hits for a .142 batting average.

Later, he became a full-time umpire for the National League in 1895 when he officiated in 112 games. He also is credited with umpiring one game in 1900, five games in 1905, and three games in 1910. He is also credited with seven ejections during the 1895 season. Murray died at the age of 57 in his hometown of Boston, Massachusetts, and is interred at Holyhood Cemetery in Brookline, Massachusetts.
