= Ed Coughlin =

American baseball player (1861–1952)

- Outfielder/Pitcher
- Born: August 5, 1861; Hartford, Connecticut, US
- Died: December 25, 1952 (aged 91); Hartford, Connecticut, US
- Batted: Unknown Threw: Unknown

MLB debut
- May 15, 1884, for the Buffalo Bisons

Last MLB appearance
- May 15, 1884, for the Buffalo Bisons

MLB statistics
- Games played: 1
- At bats: 4
- Hits: 1
- Stats at Baseball Reference

Teams
- Buffalo Bisons (1884)

Edward E. Coughlin (August 5, 1861 – December 25, 1952) was a Major League Baseball outfielder and pitcher. Coughlin played in one game for the Buffalo Bisons on May 15, 1884.

Coughlin was born in Hartford, Connecticut, to Irish parents. On May 15, 1884, he made his first and only appearance in a major league game for the Buffalo Bisons of the National League. Buffalo played the Philadelphia Quakers. He was used as both an outfielder and a pitcher in that game. As a pitcher, he faced five batters, allowed four runs, three of them earned, and threw two wild pitches. He left the mound without recording an out. In the outfield, he recorded two putouts, and made one error. At the plate, Coughlin batted four times, struk out twice, and collected a hit. He also drove in a run.

In addition to his one major league game, Coughlin played in the minor leagues in 1884 and 1886. He played for both Youngstown of the Iron & Oil Association and Hartford in the Connecticut State League in 1884. In 1886, he played in the New England League with the Brockton ball club. He died in Hartford in 1952 at the age of 91. He is buried at Mount St. Benedict Cemetery in Bloomfield, Connecticut.
