= Joe Brown (utility player) =

American baseball player (1859–1888)

- Pitcher / Outfielder
- Born: April 4, 1859; Canada
- Died: June 28, 1888 (aged 29); Warren, Pennsylvania, U.S.
- Batted: Unknown Threw: Unknown

MLB debut
- August 16, 1884, for the Chicago White Stockings

Last MLB appearance
- July 16, 1885, for the Baltimore Orioles

MLB statistics
- Win–loss record: 4–6
- Earned run average: 5.11
- Strikeouts: 36
- Batting average: .200
- Home runs: 0
- Runs batted in: 3
- Stats at Baseball Reference

Teams
- Chicago White Stockings (1884); Baltimore Orioles (1885)

Joseph E. Brown (April 4, 1859 – June 28, 1888) was a Canadian pitcher and utility player in Major League Baseball for the Chicago White Stockings and Baltimore Orioles.

It was relatively common in the 19th century for baseball teams to use a reserve fielder as a pitcher, and this appears to be true in Brown's case. He appeared in 15 games for the 1884 Cubs (debuting August 16), pitching in seven of those games, six as a starter. His mark that season was 4–2 with a 4.68 ERA. He also played center field, right field, first baseman, and catcher for the Cubs that season, hitting .213 with 3 RBI in 61 trips to the plate.

Brown found himself with the American Association's Orioles in the 1886 season in a similar role for a brief period of time. He pitched in four games, completing and losing each one for a record of 0–4 and an ERA of 5.68. He also appeared in one game as a second baseman. Brown was 3-for-19 at the plate in 1886 to finish his career with a batting average of exactly .200 (16-for-80).

Brown died on June 28, 1888, in Warren, Pennsylvania, aged just 29.
