= John Hibbard =

American baseball player (1864–1937)

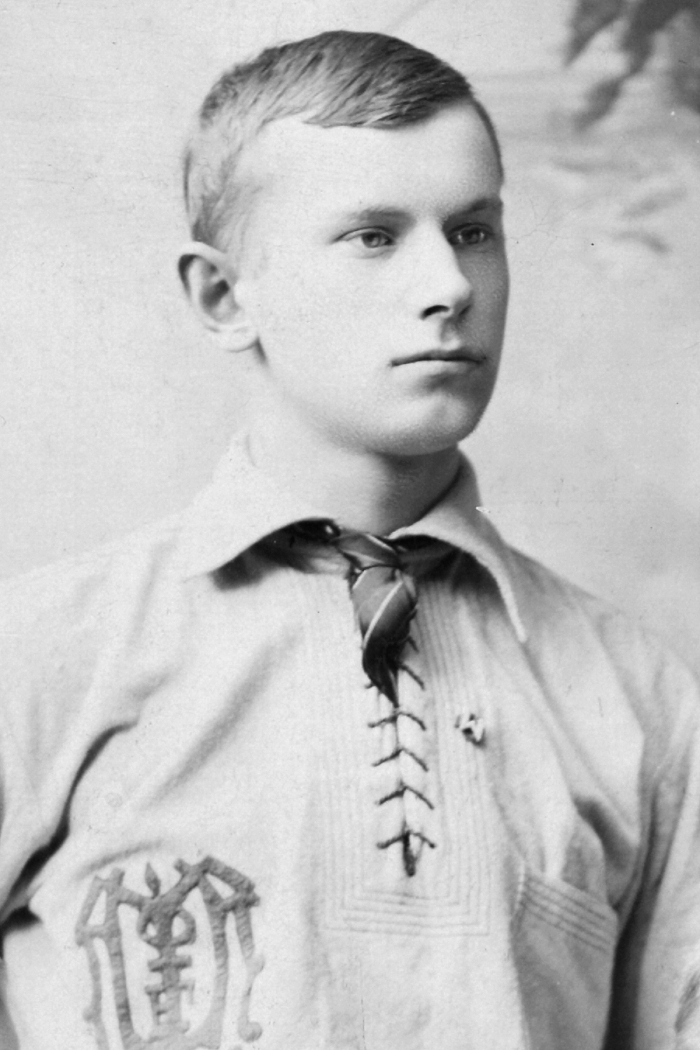
- Pitcher
- Born: December 2, 1864; Chicago
- Died: November 17, 1937 (aged 72); Hollywood, California
- Batted: Unknown Threw: Left

MLB debut
- July 31, 1884, for the Chicago White Stockings

Last MLB appearance
- August 2, 1884, for the Chicago White Stockings

MLB statistics
- Win–loss record: 1–1
- Earned run average: 2.65
- Strikeouts: 4
- Stats at Baseball Reference

Teams
- Chicago White Stockings (1884)

John Denison Hibbard (July 31, 1864 – November 17, 1937) was an American baseball pitcher and businessman. He played for the Chicago White Stockings in 1884. He also pitched four years of college baseball at the University of Michigan from 1884 to 1887 and played briefly for the Hamilton Clippers of the International League in 1886. From 1887 to 1923, he had a successful career in the metals and manufacturing businesses in Chicago. He served as president of the John Davis Co., Davis Construction Co., North American Securities Co., the Chicago Metal Trades Association, and the Central Supply Association. He also served as the commissioner of the National Metal Trades Association from 1913 to 1922.

== Early years ==
Hibbard was born in Chicago. His father, Homer Nash Hibbard, was a Vermont native who attended Harvard Law School and then established a law practice in Chicago. The younger Hibbard grew up in Chicago, attended public primary school, and prepared for college at Hyde Park High School.

== University of Michigan ==
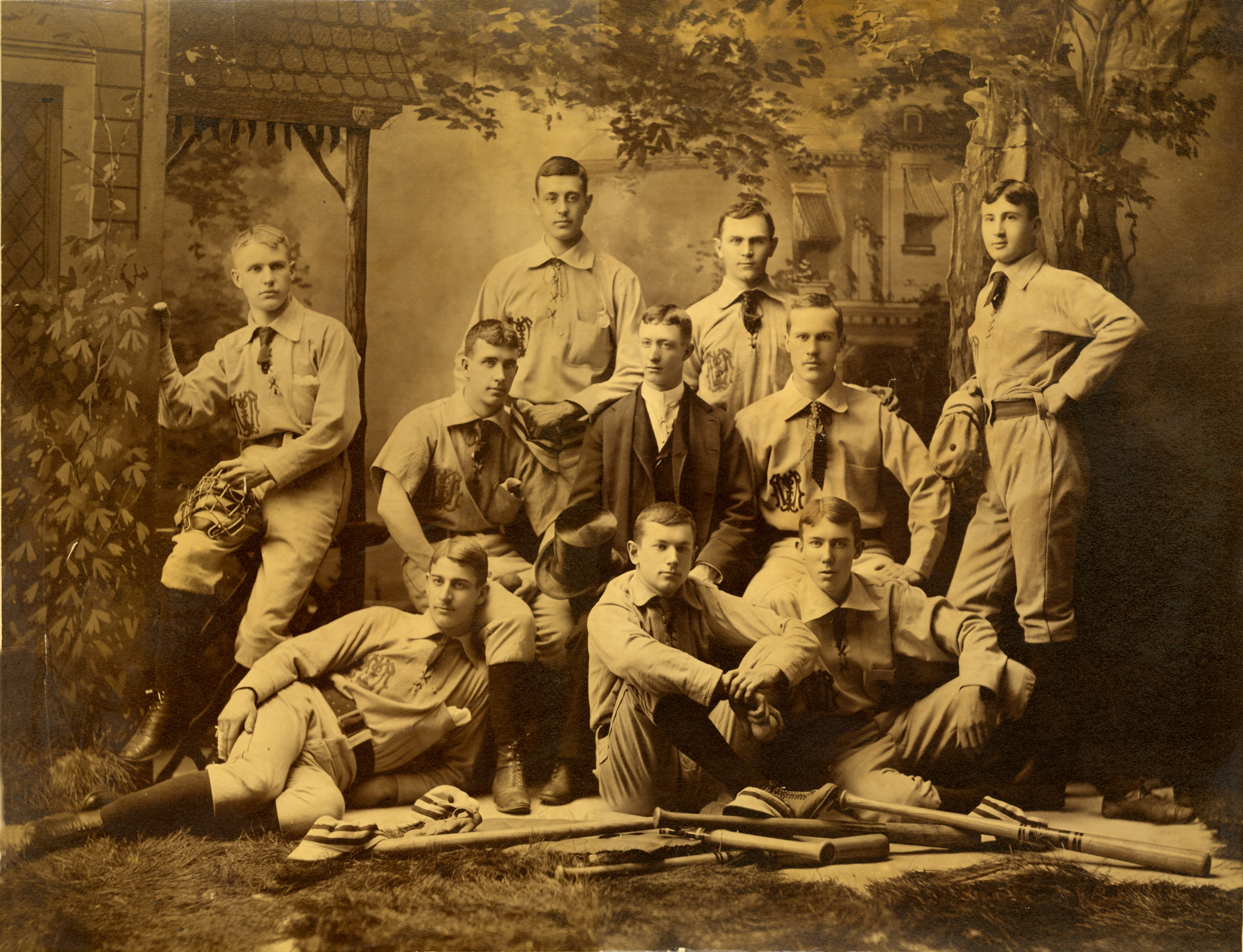
1886 Michigan baseball team, Hibbard (captain) seated in middle of front row

In the fall of 1883, he enrolled at the University of Michigan as part of the first class of six students in the mechanical engineering program. He was a member of the Michigan Wolverines baseball team for four years from 1884 to 1887 and the team's captain in 1885 and 1886. He was the team's principal pitcher all four years at Michigan. While attending Michigan, Hibbard was also a member of the University Athletic Board, the University Glee Club, and the Sigma Chi fraternity.

== Professional baseball ==
Between July 31 and August 2, 1884, Hibbard played in two games for the Chicago White Stockings of the National League, compiling a record of one win and one loss and an earned run average of 2.65.

Despite his brief stint in professional baseball in the summer of 1884, Hibbard returned to play for Michigan for three more years. He also appeared in three games for the Hamilton Clippers of the International League in 1886, compiling a record of two wins and one loss and an earned run average of 2.00.

== Business career ==
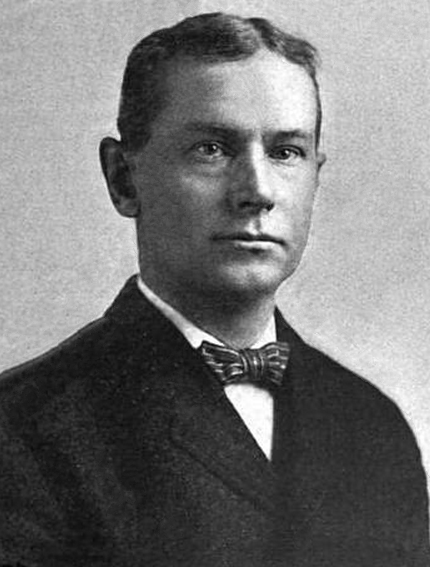
Hibbard, c. 1906

After graduating from Michigan, Hibbard worked as a metallurgical engineer. In 1887, he accepted a position with The John Davis Co. in Chicago. In December 1889, Hibbard married Josie W. Davis, the daughter of John Davis for whose company he was employed. He was the company's vice president from 1889 to 1901. When John Davis died in 1901, Hibbard became the company's president. He remained as the company's president until 1909, after the company was taken over by the United States Steel Corporation. By 1906, the company had grown to have millions of dollars in annual business. In 1907, the company' steam-fitting operation was incorporated as the Davis Construction Co. with Hibbard as the president.

While associated with The John Davis Co., Hibbard also served as the president of the Chicago Metal Trades Association. In July 1904, McClure's Magazine wrote:

"The Chicago Metal Trades Association is an organization of more than one hundred manufacturers, employing 15,000 men. Its president is John D. Hibbard . . . Mr. Hibbard is the genius of the association, a man of enthusiasm and earnestness, a graduate of the University of Michigan, with a training in fair play on the college ball field."

Hibbard was an opponent of unionism and went through "no fewer than seventeen strikes in as many years" at The John Davis Co. The American Employer noted that, in 1904, as president of the Chicago branch of the National Metals Trade Association, Hibbard "successfully fought a stubborn strike of machinists." By 1907, Hibbard also served as the president of the Central Supply Association. From 1909 to 1912, he was the president of the North American Securities Co.

== National Metals Trade Association ==
In 1913, Hibbard was appointed as the commissioner of the National Metals Trade Association, a trade association of companies employing machinists, polishers, pattern makers and other machine shop workers. He served in that position until January 1922. In July 1914, Hibbard appearance before the Commission on Industrial Relations conducting an investigation of industrial conditions and relations in Chicago. Hibbard testified in opposition to the labor union movement and collective bargaining. He testified that the National Metals Trade Association was made up of manufacturers of automobiles, anchors, chains, motorcycles, machine tools, and "almost anything that is made in the ordinary machine shop." He testified that the preliminary purpose of the organization, and the reason for its existence, was mutual protection in labor disputes. During his time as commissioner, the organization grew from 732 to 1,013 members.

Hibbard retired in 1924.

== Family and later years ==
Hibbard and his wife Josie had two children, Helen Hibbard (born 1891) and John Davis Hibbard (born 1895). After retiring, Hibbard moved to Hollywood, Los Angeles, California. At the time of the 1930 United States census, he was living in a house valued at $50,000 at 1805 Fuller Avenue in Hollywood. He lived there with a housekeeper (May Glanville) and two servants. In February 1931, Hibbard and his second wife May Hibbard traveled to Havana, Cuba on the S.S. Cartago. In December 1935, Hibbard and his second wife May G. Hibbard traveled to Yokohama, Japan, aboard the S.S. Roseville. In July 1937, Hibbard and his wife May traveled to Honolulu, Hawaii. In November 1937, Hibbard died at age 72 in Hollywood.
