= Buck Becannon =

American baseball player (1859–1923)

- Pitcher
- Born: August 22, 1859; New York City, U.S.
- Died: November 5, 1923 (aged 64); New York City, U.S.
- Batted: Unknown Threw: Unknown

MLB debut
- October 15, 1884, for the New York Metropolitans

Last MLB appearance
- May 28, 1887, for the New York Giants

MLB statistics
- Win–loss record: 3–8
- Earned run average: 5.93
- Strikeouts: 15
- Stats at Baseball Reference

Teams
- New York Metropolitans (1884–1885); New York Giants (1887)

James Melvin Becannon (August 22, 1859 – November 5, 1923) was an American Major League Baseball pitcher for the New York Metropolitans of the American Association. He later played in one game as a third baseman for the New York Giants of the National League. He also played for several years in the minor leagues, where he was a teammate of Connie Mack in Hartford.

He died in New York City on November 5, 1923.
