= George Moolic =

American baseball player (1867–1915)

- Catcher
- Born: March 12, 1867; Lawrence, Massachusetts, U.S.
- Died: February 19, 1915 (aged 47); Lawrence, Massachusetts, U.S.
- Batted: Right Threw: Right

MLB debut
- May 1, 1886, for the Chicago White Stockings

Last MLB appearance
- September 7, 1886, for the Chicago White Stockings

MLB statistics
- Batting average: .143
- Runs scored: 9
- Runs batted in: 2
- Stats at Baseball Reference

Teams
- Chicago White Stockings (1886)

George Henry "Prunes" Moolic (March 12, 1867, in Lawrence, Massachusetts – February 19, 1915) was an American professional baseball player who played catcher in the Major Leagues in 1886. He played for the Chicago White Stockings and with a local team of the New England League and with a club from Meriden, Connecticut.

Moolic died on February 19, 1915, at the age of 47. He had been suffering from a nasal hemorrhage for three weeks. He is buried in St. Mary Cemetery in Lawrence, Massachusetts.
