= Henry Oxley =

Canadian baseball player (1858–1945)

- Catcher
- Born: January 4, 1858; Covehead, Prince Edward Island
- Died: October 9, 1945 (aged 87); Somerville, Massachusetts, US
- Batted: Right Threw: unknown

MLB debut
- July 30, 1884, for the New York Gothams

Last MLB appearance
- October 10, 1884, for the New York Metropolitans

MLB statistics
- Batting average: .000
- Home runs: 0
- Runs batted in: 0
- Stats at Baseball Reference

Teams
- New York Gothams (1884); New York Metropolitans (1884)

Henry Havelock Oxley (January 4, 1858 – October 9, 1945) was an athlete who played Major League Baseball in 1884 for the New York Gothams (now known as the San Francisco Giants) and the New York Metropolitans. He is one of only three players from Prince Edward Island to have played in Major League Baseball.

== Early years ==
Oxley was born in Covehead, Prince Edward Island, Canada. He moved to Massachusetts at a young age; passenger records indicate that he arrived in Boston with his family on a ship from Charlottetown, Prince Edward Island in November 1858 at age 21 months. At the time of the 1870 United States census, Oxley was living with his parents and eight siblings in East Boston. His father, Alex Oxley, was employed at the time as a blacksmith. At the time of the 1880 United States census, Oxley was living in Lynn, Massachusetts, and was employed in a shoe shop.

== Major League Baseball ==
In 1884, Oxley played Major League Baseball with both the New York Gothams (now known as the San Francisco Giants) and the New York Metropolitans. He played in just three games at the catcher position and ended his career without getting a hit. In his book, "Catcher: How the Man Behind the Plate Became an American Folk Hero," baseball historian Peter Morris recounted a story about Oxley's first appearance in the major leagues. Morris wrote that, when Oxley noticed that the opposing team's catcher was wearing a chest protector, Oxley asked what the device was. Oxley decided to try using the device but did not realize that it needed to be inflated. When Oxley came into the game with a deflated chest protector, a player from the opposing team reportedly "took pity on him and showed him how to blow it up." Oxley was also not wearing a face mask, a protective device that had been introduced seven years earlier. After the incident, a reporter wrote that Oxley must be from the "Green Mountains."

Oxley is one of only three players from Prince Edward Island (the others being Vern Handrahan and George Wood) to have played in Major League Baseball.

Oxley also played minor league baseball in 1884 for the Lynn, Massachusetts team in the Massachusetts State Association and in 1885 for the Portland, Maine team in the Eastern New England League.

== Family and later years ==
Oxley was married to Frances "Fanny" (Auld) Oxley, and they had one child, Rita Isabelle Oxley, born in 1918. At the time of the 1920 United States census, Oxley was living in Somerville, Massachusetts with his wife, Frances, their daughter, and two lodgers. Oxley was employed at that time as a blacksmith in his own shop. In 1930, Oxley remained living in Somerville with his wife and daughter. They had seven lodgers residing with them at that time. Oxley died at Somerville in 1945.
