= Marty Barrett (catcher) =

American baseball player (1860–1910)

- Catcher
- Born: November 1860; Port Henry, New York, U.S.
- Died: January 29, 1910 (aged 49); Holyoke, Massachusetts, U.S.
- Batted: Right Threw: Right

MLB debut
- June 24, 1884, for the Boston Beaneaters

Last MLB appearance
- October 15, 1884, for the Indianapolis Hoosiers

MLB statistics
- Batting average: .053
- Home runs: 0
- Runs batted in: 0
- Stats at Baseball Reference

Teams
- Boston Beaneaters (1884); Indianapolis Hoosiers (1884)

Martin F. Barrett (November 10, 1860 – January 29, 1910) was an American Major League Baseball catcher. He played in 1884 for the Boston Beaneaters of the National League and the Indianapolis Hoosiers of the American Association.

Besides playing baseball, Barrett worked as a bartender and for S.J. Wolohan and Company. He died in 1910 after a brief illness.
