= Gene Moriarty =

American baseball player (1863–1904)

- Outfielder
- Born: January 6, 1863; Holyoke, Massachusetts, U.S.
- Died: May 18, 1904 (aged 41); St. Louis, Missouri, U.S.
- Batted: Left Threw: Left

MLB debut
- June 18, 1884, for the Boston Beaneaters

Last MLB appearance
- October 15, 1892, for the St. Louis Browns

MLB statistics
- Batting average: .152
- Home runs: 3
- Runs batted in: 23
- Stats at Baseball Reference

Teams
- Boston Beaneaters (1884); Indianapolis Hoosiers (1884); Detroit Wolverines (1885); St. Louis Browns (1892)

Eugene John Moriarty (January 6, 1863 – May 18, 1904) was an American Major League Baseball outfielder. He played in the major leagues in 1884, 1885, and 1892. He also played in the minors from 1884 to 1892 including the Monmouth Maple Cities (Illinois-Iowa League) in 1890.
