= John Connor (baseball) =

American baseball player (1861–1905)

- Pitcher
- Born: July 1861; Nashua, New Hampshire, U.S.
- Died: November 24, 1905 (aged 44); Nashua, New Hampshire, U.S.
- Batted: Unknown Threw: Unknown

MLB debut
- July 26, 1884, for the Boston Beaneaters

Last MLB appearance
- August 24, 1885, for the Louisville Colonels

MLB statistics
- W–L record: 2–8
- Games pitched: 12
- Earned run average: 3.81
- Stats at Baseball Reference

Teams
- Boston Beaneaters (1884); Buffalo Bisons (1885); Louisville Colonels (1885)

John Connor (July 1861 – November 24, 1905) was an American Major League Baseball player who pitched a total of 12 games over the course of his two-season career. He had a win–loss record of 2–8 and a 3.81 earned run average in 104 innings pitched. He began his career with the Boston Beaneaters for the 1884 season, later playing for both the Buffalo Bisons and the Louisville Colonels during the 1885 season. On August 29, 1885, Connor was traded by Louisville to the Chattanooga, Tennessee team of the Southern League for Toad Ramsey. Connor died at the age of 44 in his hometown of Nashua, New Hampshire, and is interred at St. Patrick Cemetery in Hudson, New Hampshire.
