= Messer Street Grounds =

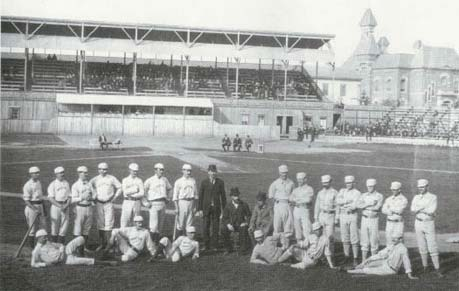
- Messer Street Grounds, spring 1879, with Boston and Providence clubs
- Interactive map of Messer Street Grounds
- Location: Providence, Rhode Island
- Coordinates: 41.813179°N 71.437064°W
- Owner: Providence Base Ball Association
- Capacity: 6,000
- Surface: Grass
- Field size: Left Field – 281 ft (86 m); Left-Center – 356 ft (109 m); Center Field – 318 ft (97 m); Right-Center – 356 ft (109 m); Right Field – 431 ft (131 m); Fences – 12 ft (3.7 m)

Construction
- Opened: May 1, 1878
- Closed: September 1886
- Demolished: 1887

Tenants
- Providence Grays (NL) (1878–1885); Providence Grays (EL) (1886)

Messer Street Grounds, also known as Messer Park or Messer Field, was a baseball park located in Providence, Rhode Island. It was home to the Providence Grays of the National League from 1878 to 1885 and of the minor league Providence Grays of the Eastern League in 1886.

In 1878, the Providence Base Ball Association formed and began scouting around the city for a good location for "the best baseball plant in the country." Team directors visited the old Josiah Chapin farm on city's west side and decided that it fit all of the requirements for a baseball park. It was close to level, it was raised up a few feet from the surrounding roads, and it was easily accessible by street car.

Construction on Messer Park began on April 1 and took exactly one month to complete; the final nail was hammered a mere five minutes before the opening game got underway on May 1.

== Ballpark Description ==
The new ballpark opened to the public on May 1, 1878. The following account from the Providence Morning Star captures the excitement and provides a very detailed description of the park:

"The large grandstand held twelve hundred people, among them hundreds of ladies. The long semi-circular tiers of seats were black with men and boys, and hundreds were standing, unable to get seats. The commodious space for carriages was completely filled, and one or two May Day riding parties also graced that part of the grounds...Two registering turnstiles gates admit the patrons to the grounds, and as each ticket holder passes through the gate he steps on a raised platform, and by a mechanical arrangement is registered, and only one person can pass through the gate at a time. Near the gate are two ticket offices, and a large entrance through which the crowd can pass at the end of the game. At the southeast corner there is a large gate to admit carriages to the park. The ground, which contains nearly six acres of land, is enclosed by a fence twelve feet high. The diamond is as level as constant rolling by heavy stone and iron rollers can make it. Inside of the base lines is turfed, except a space nine feet in width, reaching from the pitcher's position to the home plate. Twenty-two feet are sodded outside of the diamond. Paths leading to and from the bases have been rolled hard, and the out-field is sown with grass seed. The grand stand which will seat nearly 1200 people, is 151 x 40 feet (12 m), and in the rear is raised 34 feet (10 m). The stand is reached by steps at both ends. It will be covered by canvass, requiring nearly 7,000 feet (2,100 m). Seats are arranged in a circle at the eastern and western sides of the field. A platform 60 x 8 feet (2.4 m) has been erected for the reporters, scorers and invited guests, seating nearly 60 persons. Under the grand stand for the visiting and local clubs are rooms 20 feet (6.1 m) square and fitted up with wardrobes, dressing rooms 20 feet (6.1 m) square, a wash room supplied with Pawtucket water, closet, etc. The Western Union Telegraph Company have a room 8 x 10 feet (3.0 m). There is a stockholders' room 20 feet (6.1 m) square, and a refreshment saloon 40 x 20 to be managed by caterer Ardoene. A fence with gateways has been erected in front of the club rooms, thereby preventing the crowd from having any talk with the players. The grounds are without doubt as fine as any in the country, and Harry Wright said yesterday, 'They are beautiful."

The left field fence was apparently quite close to home plate. One reporter complained that "a hit made in Providence near that foul line post is not a long hit; in fact that same hit in the right field seldom gives more than one base." Despite the allegedly short fence, the Messer Street Grounds was not a friendly home run park. Only eight home runs were hit there in National League games all year long, compared to about two hundred at Chicago's tiny park. Those eight included four over the left field fence, an inside-the-park home run by Paul Hines, and one smash by Jerry Denny that landed in the carriage driveway in right-center field, which was called "the longest ever made upon the grounds." Just beyond the short left field lay a building where fans could sit on the roof and watch the game for the discounted rate of 25 cents, probably to the chagrin of the team management. One particularly powerful home run by Jerry Denny "sailed away like a hawk, rising and rising until long after it passed the left field fence, and until it was far above the housetops, finally dropping in a garden near the street."

The Grays were the first professional team to install a backstop in their park. The screens were installed in 1878 along the grandstand section directly behind the catcher, an area known as the "slaughter pens" for all the foul ball injuries that occurred there.

== Renovations ==
Before the 1884 season, a few minor improvements on the park were made. The reporters' area of the grand stand was supplied with comfortable cushions by former team president Flint, which all of the reporters noted with gratitude. A score slate was also placed in left field to show the Boston scores by inning as they came in over the telegraph. Finally, "some elaborate pictures have been obtained by Director Allen, measuring 7 x 13 feet (4.0 m), giving a life-size illustration of the diamond and a game in progress, which will be displayed on prominent boards on schedule days."

== The End of Messer Street Grounds ==
The park housed the minor league Providence Grays of the Eastern League in 1886, but the park was too large for the pitiful attendance that the team drew, and by early June the park was once again empty. Rumors began circulating about the sale of the park in September 1886. On February 16, 1887, trustee Greene finally sold off the property that the Messer Street Grounds sat on, in a deed to the Franklin Institute for Savings. The exact demolition date of the park is unknown, but must have been at some point during the next few months. By the end of the year, the subdivided plots were selling off at a rapid clip, and houses started to spring up where the old ball park used to stand.
