= Mike Hines (baseball) =

Irish baseball player (1862–1910)

- Catcher
- Born: September 1862; Ireland
- Died: March 14, 1910 (aged 47); Taunton, Massachusetts, U.S.
- Batted: Right Threw: Left

MLB debut
- May 1, 1883, for the Boston Beaneaters

Last MLB appearance
- August 18, 1888, for the Boston Beaneaters

MLB statistics
- Batting average: .202
- Home runs: 0
- Runs batted in: 26
- Stats at Baseball Reference

Teams
- Boston Beaneaters (1883–1885); Brooklyn Grays (1885); Providence Grays (1885); Boston Beaneaters (1888)

Michael P. Hines (September 1862 – March 14, 1910) was a 19th-century Irish born Major League Baseball catcher. He played from 1883 to 1891 and 1895 with the Boston Beaneaters, Brooklyn Grays, and Providence Grays.
