= Frank Bancroft =

American baseball manager

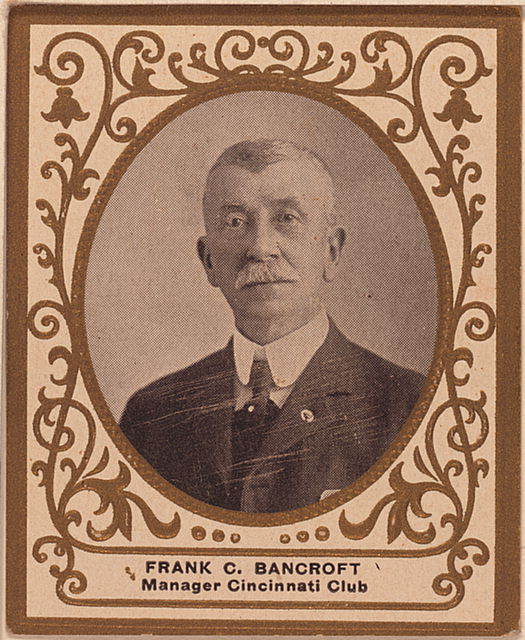
- Manager
- Born: May 9, 1846; Lancaster, Massachusetts, U.S.
- Died: March 30, 1921 (aged 74); Cincinnati, Ohio, U.S.
- Batted: Unknown Threw: Unknown

MLB debut
- May 1, 1880, for the Worcester Worcesters

Last MLB appearance
- July 29, 1902, for the Cincinnati Reds

MLB statistics
- Games managed: 719
- Win–loss record: 375–333
- Winning %: .530

Teams
- Worcester Worcesters (1880); Detroit Wolverines (1881–1882); Cleveland Blues (NL) (1883); Providence Grays (1884–1885); Philadelphia Athletics (1887); Indianapolis Hoosiers (1889); Cincinnati Reds (1902)

Career highlights and awards
- World Series champion (1884)

Francis Carter Bancroft (May 9, 1846 – March 30, 1921) was an American manager in Major League Baseball for the Worcester Ruby Legs, Detroit Wolverines, Cleveland Blues, Providence Grays, Indianapolis Hoosiers, and Cincinnati Reds of the National League, as well as the Philadelphia Athletics of the American Association. His greatest success came with the Grays, when he won the 1884 World Series with a record of 84–28 (.750 winning percentage). His stops with teams were short, usually in an interim role, with his last stop being with the Reds after Bid McPhee left the job as manager. Bancroft was 56 years old at the time. (*According to the book Opening Day, Bancroft was the Reds business manager from 1892 - 1920. He was a promotional genius and in 1895, with the help of Reds captain Buck Ewing as a local draw, the first parade included a marching band and was headed up by a three-car streetcar. The streets were a congested mass of humanity, and "Banny" knew this was the start of something BIG for the Queen City!)

Bancroft served in the 8th New Hampshire Infantry Regiment of the Union Army during the American Civil War. He was a drummer, and was wounded in New Orleans. After recovering, he returned to his regiment and achieved the rank of bugler. He died in Cincinnati at age 74.
