= Tom Gunning =

American baseball player (1862–1931)

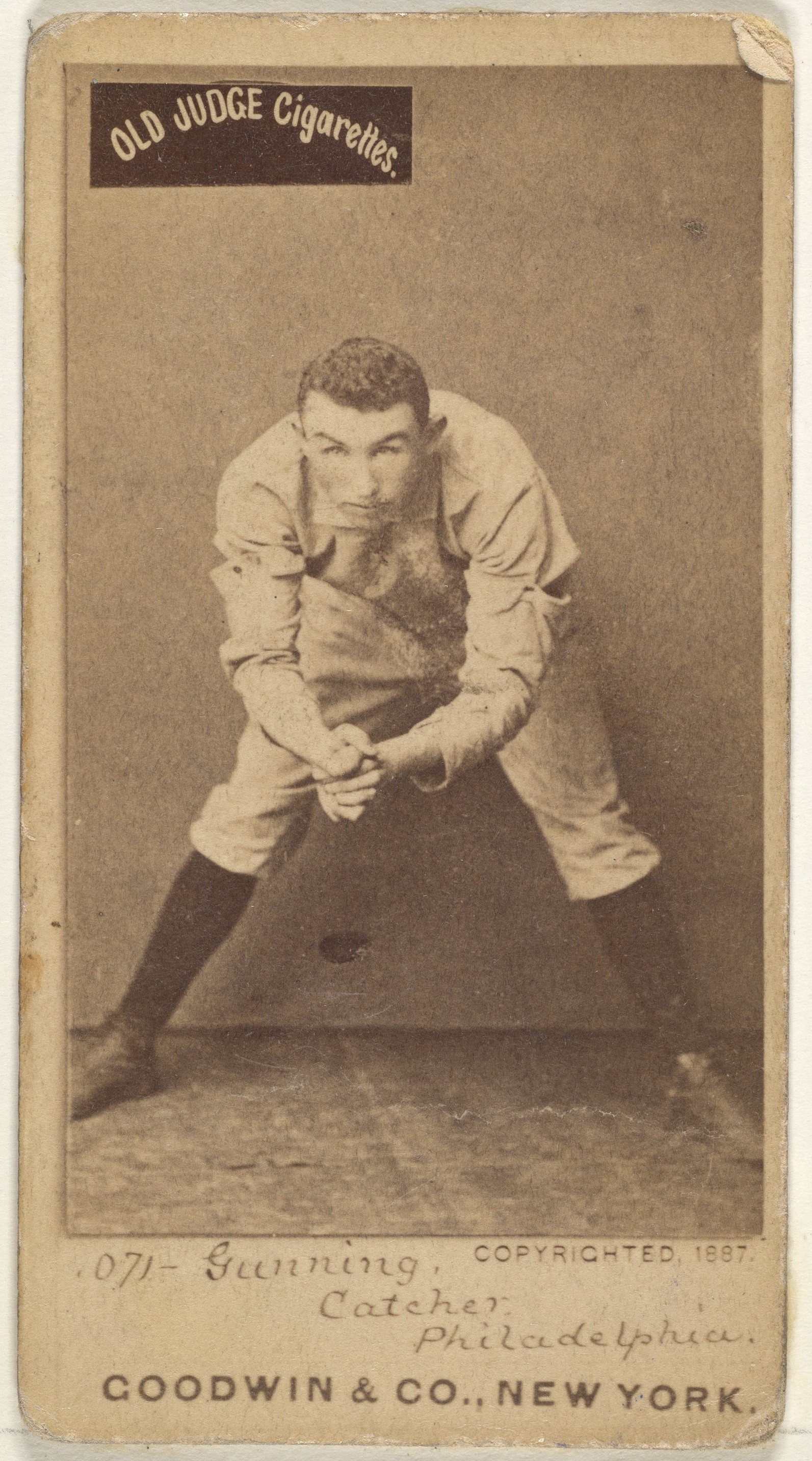
- Catcher
- Born: March 4, 1862; Newmarket, New Hampshire, US
- Died: March 17, 1931 (aged 69); Fall River, Massachusetts, US
- Batted: Right Threw: Right

MLB debut
- July 26, 1884, for the Boston Beaneaters

Last MLB appearance
- June 18, 1889, for the Philadelphia Athletics

MLB statistics
- Batting average: .205
- Home runs: 2
- Runs batted in: 46
- Stats at Baseball Reference

Teams
- Boston Beaneaters (1884–1886); Philadelphia Quakers (1887); Philadelphia Athletics (1888–1889)

Thomas Francis Gunning (March 4, 1862 – March 17, 1931) was an American professional baseball catcher and umpire. He played six seasons in the major leagues, from 1884 until 1889. Listed at 5 feet 10 inches (1.78 m) and 160 pounds (73 kg), he batted and threw right-handed. Gunning umpired 44 major league games during the 1890 season. After his baseball career, Gunning worked as a physician and medical examiner.

== Playing career ==
Gunning began his professional baseball career in 1883 in the Northwestern League, (Note: The Northwestern League, Massachusetts State Association, and Atlantic Association are not considered major leagues.) playing for the team representing Springfield, Illinois. In 1884, he played for the Boston Reserves of the Massachusetts State Association.

Gunning's major league career spanned 1884 to 1889, with three different teams. From 1884 through 1886, he played for the Boston Beaneaters of the National League. (Note: The Beaneaters later became the Boston Braves, who in 1953 moved to Milwaukee, and in 1966 relocated again to become the Atlanta Braves.) He appeared in a total of 87 games with Boston, recording a .186 batting average with 24 RBIs. In April 1887, the Beaneaters sold Gunning's contract to the Philadelphia Quakers of the National League. (Note: The Quakers have been known as the Philadelphia Phillies since 1890.) He batting .260 with 16 RBIs and one home run in 28 games during 1887, his one season with the Quakers. In 1888, Gunning was released by the Quakers and signed by the Philadelphia Athletics of the American Association. (Note: The American Association operated from 1882 to 1891 and is considered a major league by baseball historians.). He played for the Athletics during 1888 and 1889, appearing in 31 games while batting .207 with six RBIs and one home run. The Athletics released Gunning on June 29, 1889.

Overall, Gunning appeared in 146 major league games, compiling a career .205 batting average with 46 RBIs and two home runs. All of his defensive appearances were at catcher, playing a maximum of 48 games in a season, which he recorded with the 1885 Boston Beaneaters. He had a career .887 fielding average. In his final two major league seasons, Gunning served as backup to Wilbert Robinson of the Athletics, who later managed the Brooklyn Robins (Note: The Robins have been known as the Dodgers since 1932; in 1958, the team relocated and became the Los Angeles Dodgers.) from 1914 through 1931 and was inducted to the Baseball Hall of Fame in 1945.

Late in his career, Gunning played in the Atlantic Association in 1889 for the team representing Hartford, Connecticut.

== Umpiring career ==
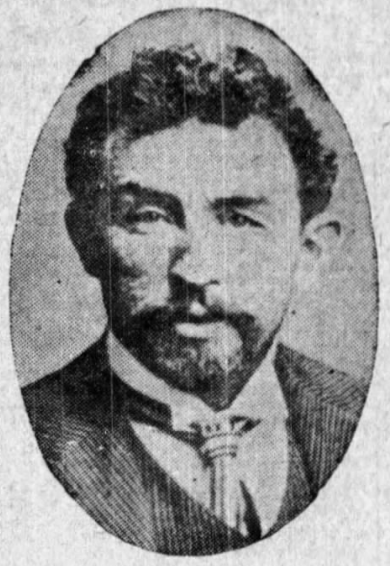
Gunning as pictured in The Boston Globe in 1909

During his time as a player, Gunning served as umpire in 10 major league games; these were all games that his team was playing in. In this era, reserve players were sometimes called upon to officiate games due to the absence of scheduled umpires, caused by illness, injury, or travel issues. Following his playing career, Gunning umpired 44 games (30 at first base, 14 at home plate) in the Players' League during 1890, (Note: The Players' League, which only operated during 1890, is considered a major league by baseball historians.) from mid-April to mid-June.

== Personal life ==
Gunning was born in Newmarket, New Hampshire, in 1862. He graduated from the University of Pennsylvania Medical School in 1891, and later served as city physician and medical examiner for Fall River, Massachusetts. He died in Fall River in 1931 and is interred in the North End Burial Ground there. He was survived by his wife, Ida Gunning née Corcoran (d. 1951), and a son, Reverend Thomas C. Gunning (1899–1947) of Taunton, Massachusetts.
