= Detroit Wolverines all-time roster =

List of baseball players

The following is a list of players and who appeared in at least one game for the Detroit Wolverines franchise of the National League from 1881 through 1888.

β= indicates Baseball Hall of Famer

== B ==
- Lady Baldwin
- Ed Beatin
- Dave Beadle
- Charlie Bennett
- George Bradley
- Frank Brill
- Fatty Briody
- Cal Broughton
- Dan Brouthers β
- Lew Brown
- George Bryant
- Henry Buker
- Bill Burke
- Dick Burns

== C ==
- Count Campau
- Bob Casey
- Dan Casey
- Chub Collins
- Pete Conway
- Frank Cox
- Sam Crane

== D ==
- Harry Decker
- George Derby
- Jim Donnelly
- Jerry Dorgan
- Mike Dorgan
- Fred Dunlap

== F ==
- Joe Farrell
- Will Foley
- Tom Forster

== G ==
- Charlie Ganzel
- Ed Gastfield
- Bill Geiss
- Joe Gerhardt
- Charlie Getzien
- Tom Gillen
- Barney Gilligan
- Henry Gruber
- Ben Guiney

== H ==
- Jim Halpin
- Ned Hanlon β
- Sadie Houck

== J ==
- Frank Jones
- Henry Jones
- Jack Jones

== K ==
- Tom Kearns
- Nate Kellogg
- Walt Kinzie
- Lon Knight

== L ==
- Sam LaRocque
- Jack Leary
- Dick Lowe
- Henry Luff

== M ==
- Jim Manning
- Tom Mansell
- Jack McGeachey
- Mike McGeary
- Deacon McGuire
- Frank McIntyre
- Mox McQuery
- Frank Meinke
- Jerrie Moore
- Gene Moriarty
- Tom Morrissey
- Charlie Morton
- Frank Mountain
- Mike Moynahan
- Tony Mullane

== N ==
- Parson Nicholson

== O ==
- Dan O'Leary
- Frank Olin

== P ==
- Marr Phillips
- Martin Powell
- Walter Prince

== Q ==
- Joe Quest

== R ==
- George Radbourn
- Charlie Reilley
- Hardy Richardson
- Frank Ringo
- Yank Robinson
- Jack Rowe

== S ==
- Edward Santry
- Ted Scheffler
- Frank Scheibeck
- Milt Scott
- Dupee Shaw
- Billy Shindle
- Billy Smith
- Phenomenal Smith
- Dan Stearns
- Sy Sutcliffe

== T ==
- Billy Taylor
- Sam Thompson β
- Sam Trott
- Dasher Troy
- Larry Twitchell

== W ==
- Walt Walker
- Joe Weber
- Stump Weidman
- Jake Wells
- Deacon White
- Will White
- Art Whitney
- Julius Willigrod
- Sam Wise
- Fred Wood
- George Wood

== Z ==
- Chief Zimmer
