= 1884 Detroit Wolverines season =

1884 Detroit Wolverines
- League: National League
- Ballpark: Recreation Park
- City: Detroit, Michigan
- Record: 28–84 (.250)
- League place: 8th
- Owner: Joseph Marsh
- Manager: Jack Chapman

The 1884 Detroit Wolverines finished the season with a 28–84 record, finishing in last place in the National League.

== Offseason ==
- January 1884: Milt Scott was purchased by the Wolverines from the Fort Wayne Hoosiers.

== Regular season ==
=== Season standings ===
National League
Team	W	L	Pct.	GB	Home	Road
Providence Grays	84	28	.750	—	45‍–‍11	39‍–‍17
Boston Beaneaters	73	38	.658	10½	40‍–‍16	33‍–‍22
Buffalo Bisons	64	47	.577	19½	37‍–‍18	27‍–‍29
New York Gothams	62	50	.554	22	34‍–‍22	28‍–‍28
Chicago White Stockings	62	50	.554	22	39‍–‍17	23‍–‍33
Philadelphia Quakers	39	73	.348	45	19‍–‍37	20‍–‍36
Cleveland Blues	35	77	.312	49	22‍–‍34	13‍–‍43
Detroit Wolverines	28	84	.250	56	18‍–‍38	10‍–‍46

=== Record vs. opponents ===
1884 National League record Sources:
Team	BSN	BUF	CHI	CLE	DET	NYG	PHI	PRO
Boston	—	9–6–2	10–6	14–2	12–4–1	8–8–1	13–3	7–9–1
Buffalo	6–9–2	—	10–6–1	14–2	12–4	5–11–1	11–5	6–10
Chicago	6–10	6–10–1	—	8–8	11–5	12–4	14–2	5–11
Cleveland	2–14	2–14	8–8	—	9–7	5–11	6–10–1	3–13
Detroit	4–12–1	4–12	5–11	7–9	—	2–14–1	5–11	1–15
New York	8–8–1	11–5–1	4–12	11–5	14–2–1	—	11–5	3–13–1
Philadelphia	3–13	5–11	2–14	10–6–1	11–5	5–11	—	3–13
Providence	9–7–1	10–6	11–5	13–3	15–1	13–3–1	13–3	—

=== Roster ===
1884 Detroit Wolverines
Roster
Pitchers: Frank Brill; Charlie Getzien; Dupee Shaw; Catchers: Charlie Bennett; Ed Gastfield; Ben Guiney; Dick Lowe; Walt Walker; Fred Wood; Chief Zimmer	Infielders: Henry Buker; Frank Cox; Joe Farrell; Bill Geiss; Frank Jones; Henry Jones; Tom Kearns; Frank Meinke; Edward Santry; Milt Scott	Outfielders: Dave Beadle; Ned Hanlon; Walter Prince; Joe Weber; Stump Weidman; George Wood	Manager: Jack Chapman

== Player stats ==
=== Batting ===
==== Starters by position ====
Note: Pos = Position; G = Games played; AB = At bats; H = Hits; Avg. = Batting average; HR = Home runs; RBI = Runs batted in

Pos	Player	G	AB	H	Avg.	HR	RBI
C	Charlie Bennett	90	341	90	.264	3	40
1B	Milt Scott	110	438	108	.247	3	50
2B	Bill Geiss	75	283	50	.177	2	16
3B	Joe Farrell	110	461	104	.226	3	41
SS	Frank Meinke	92	341	56	.164	6	24
OF	Stump Weidman	81	300	49	.163	0	26
OF	Ned Hanlon	114	450	119	.264	5	39
OF	George Wood	114	473	119	.252	8	29

==== Other batters ====
Note: G = Games played; AB = At bats; H = Hits; Avg. = Batting average; HR = Home runs; RBI = Runs batted in

Player	G	AB	H	Avg.	HR	RBI
Henry Jones	34	127	28	.220	0	3
Henry Buker	30	111	15	.135	0	3
Frank Cox	27	102	13	.127	0	4
Ed Gastfield	23	82	6	.073	0	2
Tom Kearns	21	79	16	.203	0	7
Fred Wood	12	42	2	.048	0	1
Charles Zimmer	8	29	2	.069	0	0
Edward Santry	6	22	4	.182	0	0
Walter Prince	7	21	3	.143	0	1
Joe Weber	2	8	0	.000	0	0
Frank Jones	2	8	1	.125	0	0
Ben Guiney	2	7	0	.000	0	0
Walt Walker	1	4	1	.250	0	0
Dave Beadle	1	3	0	.000	0	0
Dick Lowe	1	3	1	.333	0	0

=== Pitching ===
==== Starting pitchers ====
Note: G = Games pitched; IP = Innings pitched; W = Wins; L = Losses; ERA = Earned run average; SO = Strikeouts

Player	G	IP	W	L	ERA	SO
Frank Meinke	35	289.0	8	23	3.18	124
Dupee Shaw	28	227.2	9	18	3.04	142
Stump Weidman	26	212.2	4	21	3.72	96
Charlie Getzien	17	147.1	5	12	1.95	107
Frank Brill	12	103.0	2	10	5.50	18

==== Relief pitchers ====
Note: G = Games pitched; W = Wins; L = Losses; SV = Saves; ERA = Earned run average; SO = Strikeouts

Player	G	W	L	SV	ERA	SO
Bill Geiss	1	0	0	0	14.40	1
