= Chub Collins =

Canadian baseball player (1857–1914)

- Second baseman
- Born: October 12, 1857; Dundas, Canada West
- Died: May 20, 1914 (aged 56); Dundas, Ontario, Canada
- Batted: Switch Threw: Right

MLB debut
- May 1, 1884, for the Buffalo Bisons

Last MLB appearance
- July 11, 1885, for the Detroit Wolverines

MLB statistics
- Batting average: .196
- Home runs: 0
- Runs batted in: 26
- Stats at Baseball Reference

Teams
- Buffalo Bisons (1884); Indianapolis Hoosiers (1884); Detroit Wolverines (1885)

Charles Augustus "Chub" Collins (October 12, 1857 – May 20, 1914) was a Canadian professional baseball player and politician. He played two seasons in Major League Baseball from 1884 to 1885 as a second baseman and shortstop for the Buffalo Bisons, Indianapolis Hoosiers, and Detroit Wolverines. He later served as the mayor of Dundas, Ontario, from 1901 to 1902.

Collins compiled a .182 batting average and .901 fielding percentage in his major league career. In its obituary of Collins, Sporting Life wrote: "Charles 'Chub' Collins was a brainy ball player, a mediocre hitter, and one of the fastest base runners in America."

Collins also played and managed in baseball's minor leagues from 1885 to 1890 and 1896 to 1900, including stints with the International League and Canadian League teams in Hamilton, Ontario (1885–1887, 1897–1900), Rochester, New York (1888–1889), and Galt, Ontario (1896). He stole 45 bases in 1886, 85 bases in 1888, and 81 bases in 1889. His 1898 Hamilton team won the league championship "with one of the strongest minor league aggregations ever seen In Hamilton." He also served as an umpire in the Western Association in 1891.

== Early years ==
Collins was born in Dundas, Canada West (now a constituent community in the city of Hamilton, Ontario), in 1857. He began his professional baseball career playing for several clubs in the Northwestern League in 1883 and 1884, including a stint with the team from Bay City, Michigan.

== Professional baseball career ==
=== Major leagues ===
Collins reached the major leagues in May 1884 at age 26. He played 45 games, mostly at second base, for the Buffalo Bisons of the National League. He compiled a .178 batting average with six doubles and 20 RBIs in 169 at bats for Buffalo. He was reportedly released "owing to light stickwork."

On July 21, 1884, Collins signed as a free agent with the Indianapolis Hoosiers of the American Association. He appeared in 38 games at second base for the Hoosiers, compiling a .225 batting average.

Collins began the 1885 season with Indianapolis, though the team that year joined the newly formed Western League and was no longer considered a major league club. He compiled a .242 batting average with four doubles, a triple and a home run in 132 at bats for Indianapolis in 1885. The Hoosiers were the dominant team in the Western League, compiling an .880 winning percentage.

In mid-June 1885, the Western League disbanded, and a rush developed to sign the players on the Indianapolis roster, a line-up that included Sam Thompson and Deacon McGuire. The Detroit Wolverines of the National League sent two representatives to Indianapolis, principally to sign the Hoosiers' battery of Larry McKeon and Jim Keenan. The Wolverines were outbid by the Cincinnati Reds for McKeon and Keenan but wound up with the Hoosiers' manager (Bill Watkins) and the rest of the team's starting lineup.

Collins made his debut with Detroit on June 24, 1885, against Providence. He scored a run and had two RBIs in the game. Collins lasted less than three weeks with the Wolverines, appearing in his final major league game on July 11, 1885. He appeared in 14 games at the shortstop position for the Wolverines, committing 11 errors for a .792 fielding percentage. He also compiled a .182 batting average in 55 at bats for Detroit.

=== Minor leagues ===
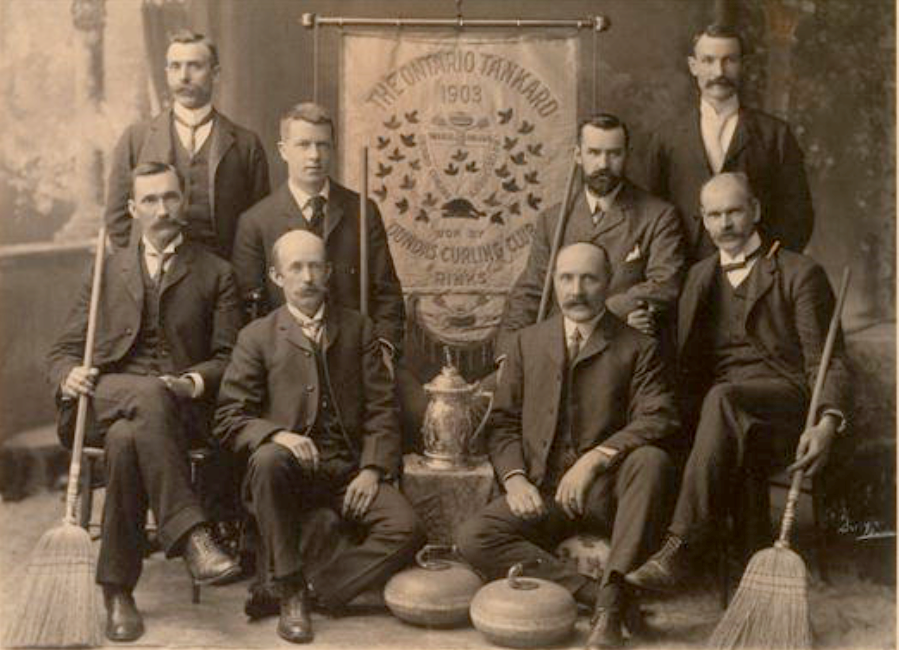
Collins, "Skip," pictured with the Dundas Curling Club, "Winners of the Ontario Tankard (Now called the Dominion Regalia Silver Tankard) - 1903"

After being released by the Wolverines, Collins finished the 1885 season with the Hamilton Clippers in the Canadian League. He became a player-manager for Hamilton when the team joined the International League in 1886 and the International Association in 1887. He then played during the 1888 and 1889 seasons with the Buffalo and Rochester teams in the International League. He compiled a career high .276 batting average in 1889. One of the fastest base-runners in baseball, Collins stole 45 bases in 1886, 85 bases in 1888, and 81 bases in 1889.

Collins played for the Omaha Omahogs in the Western Association during the first half of the 1890 season. When he signed with Omaha, the Sporting Life wrote that he was "a wonder on the bag and a fine fielder," but required "a little more control of temper." He was released by Omaha in July 1890, and in September 1890, he was playing with a team in his hometown of Dundas, Ontario, with three other former major league players (Fred Wood, Pete Wood, and John Rainey).

In the spring of 1891, Collins was sued by Phoebe Smith, a former employee of the Dundas Cotton Mills, for breach of promise of marriage. Collins was at the time at Denver, Colorado, serving as an umpire in the Western Association.

After a five-year absence from baseball, Collins returned in 1896 as a player-manager in the Canadian League for the team in Galt, Ontario. He also managed the Hamilton, Ontario team in the Canadian League and International League from 1897 to 1900. His 1898 Hamilton team won the league championship "with one of the strongest minor league aggregations ever seen In Hamilton." In September 1898, Sporting Life wrote: "Manager Charles ('Chub') Collins occasionally gets in the game, and the old ex-International Leaguer has not forgotten how the game is played. His work on several occasions has been of the fire-escape order."

== Politics and later years ==
From 1901 to 1902, Collins served as the mayor of his hometown, Dundas, Ontario. After completing his term as mayor, Collins occupied the councillor's chair of Barton Township, Ontario (now part of Hamilton, Ontario).

Following an illness that lasted for several months, Collins died at his home in Dundas in 1914 at age 56. He was buried at St. Augustine Cemetery in that city. The Sporting Life newspaper wrote in its obituary of Collins: "Charles 'Chub' Collins was a brainy ball player, a mediocre hitter, and one of the fastest base runners in America."
