= Deacon McGuire =

American baseball player, manager, and coach (1863–1936)

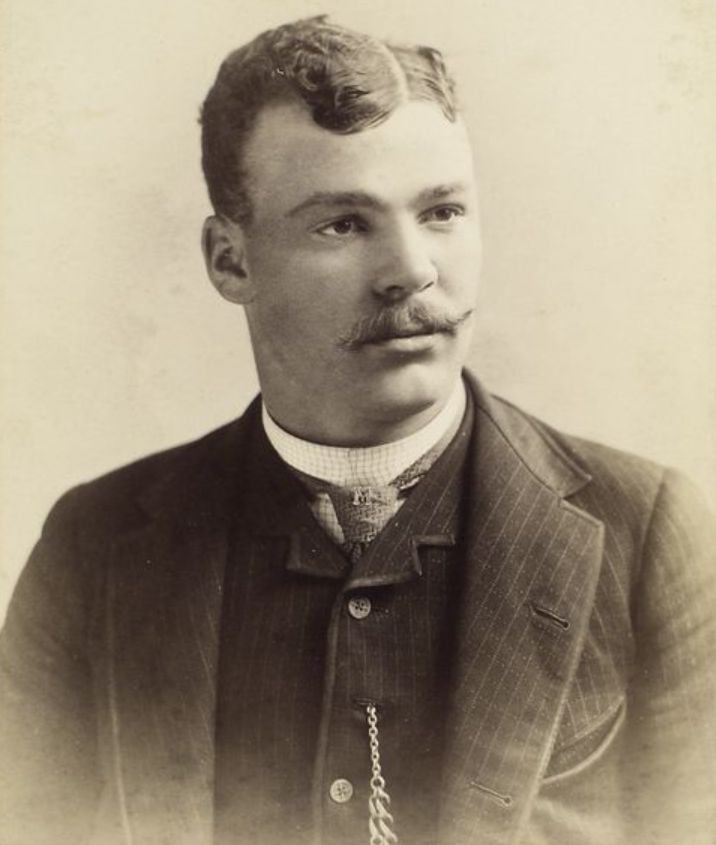
- Catcher
- Born: November 18, 1863; Youngstown, Ohio, U.S.
- Died: October 31, 1936 (aged 72); Duck Lake, Michigan, U.S.
- Batted: Right Threw: Right

MLB debut
- June 21, 1884, for the Toledo Blue Stockings

Last MLB appearance
- May 18, 1912, for the Detroit Tigers

MLB statistics
- Batting average: .278
- Hits: 1,748
- Home runs: 45
- Runs batted in: 840
- Games managed: 516
- Managerial record: 210–287
- Winning %: .423
- Stats at Baseball Reference

Teams
- As player: Toledo Blue Stockings (1884); Detroit Wolverines (1885); Philadelphia Quakers (1886–1888); Detroit Wolverines (1888); Cleveland Blues (1888); Rochester Broncos (1890); Washington Statesman/Senators (1891–1899); Brooklyn Superbas (1899–1901); Detroit Tigers (1902–1903); New York Highlanders (1904–1907); Boston Americans/Red Sox (1907–1908); Cleveland Naps (1908, 1910); Detroit Tigers (1912); As manager: Washington Senators (1898); Boston Americans/Red Sox (1907–1908); Cleveland Naps (1909–1911)

Career highlights and awards
- MLB record 1,459 runners caught stealing; MLB record 1,860 assists by a catcher

James Thomas "Deacon" McGuire (November 18, 1863 – October 31, 1936) was an American professional baseball player, manager and coach whose career spanned the years 1883 to 1915. He played 26 seasons in Major League Baseball, principally as a catcher, for 11 different major league clubs. His longest stretches were with the Washington Statesmen/Senators (901 games, 1892–99), Brooklyn Superbas (202 games, 1899–1901) and New York Highlanders (225 games, 1904–07). He played on Brooklyn teams that won National League pennants in 1899 and 1900.

McGuire was the most durable catcher of his era, setting major league catching records for most career games caught (1,612), putouts (6,856), assists (1,860), double plays turned (143), runners caught stealing (1,459), and stolen bases allowed (2,529). His assist, caught stealing, and stolen bases allowed totals remain current major league records. During his major league career, he also compiled a .278 batting average, .341 on-base percentage, 770 runs scored, 1,750 hits, 300 doubles, 79 triples, 45 home runs, 840 RBIs and 118 stolen bases. His best season was 1895 when he caught a major league record 133 games and compiled a .336 batting average with 10 home runs, 97 RBIs and 17 stolen bases.

McGuire was also the manager of the Washington Senators (1898), Boston Red Sox (1907–08) and Cleveland Indians (1909–11). He compiled a 210–287 (.423) as a major league manager.

== Early years ==
McGuire was born in Youngstown, Ohio, in 1863. He moved as a boy to Cleveland, learned to play baseball "on the lots" of that city, and at age 18 was playing for the "Woodlands" team. As a young man, he moved to Albion, Michigan, where he worked as an apprentice in an iron foundry in Albion and played baseball on the weekend.

== Professional baseball player ==
=== Minor leagues ===
McGuire first gained note playing baseball for a team in Hastings, Michigan, where he was paired with pitcher Lady Baldwin. McGuire was reputed to be "the only catcher within a 50-mile radius who could handle" the left-handed Baldwin and his "incendiary fastball and sinuous curve, a so-called 'snakeball.'" At age 19, McGuire began his professional baseball career in 1883 with the Terre Haute, Indiana, club.

=== Toledo Blue Stockings ===
McGuire made his major league debut in June 1884 with the Toledo Blue Stockings of the American Association. He hit .185 in 151 at bats and appeared in 45 games. At Toledo, he shared the catching responsibilities with Moses Fleetwood Walker, the first African-American player in Major League Baseball. McGuire and Walker each caught 41 games for the Blue Stockings. The Blue Stockings finished in eighth place (out of 13 teams) with a 46–58 record and folded after the 1884 season.

=== Detroit Wolverines ===
McGuire began the 1885 season playing for the Indianapolis Hoosiers of the newly formed Western League. McGuire appeared in 16 games for the Hoosiers, who were the dominant team in the Western League, compiling an .880 winning percentage.

In mid June 1885, the Western League disbanded, and a mad rush developed to sign the players on the Indianapolis roster, a line-up that included McGuire, Sam Thompson, Sam Crane, Chub Collins, Jim Donnelly, Mox McQuery, Gene Moriarty, and Dan Casey. Sam Thompson later told the colorful story of the Detroit Wolverines' acquisition of the Indianapolis players. Detroit sent two representatives (Marsh and Maloney) to Indianapolis, principally to sign the Hoosiers' battery of Larry McKeon and Jim Keenan. The Wolverines were outbid by the Cincinnati Reds for McKeon and Keenan but wound up with the Hoosiers' manager (Bill Watkins) and the rest of the team's starting lineup. The only catch was that a 10-day waiting period would allow other teams to outbid Detroit. Marsh and Maloney promptly sent the players to Detroit and quartered them in a hotel there. The next morning, the players were told that the team had arranged a fishing trip for them. The players boarded the steamship Annette and enjoyed the first day and night of successful fishing. After three days, the players became suspicious, but the ship captain laughed when asked when they would return to Detroit. As the players became mutinous on the sixth day, the captain admitted he had been ordered to keep them "out at sea" for 10 days. In another account, Thompson described his 10 days aboard the Annette as follows:

We were prisoners, but well cared-for prisoners. Anything in the line of creature comforts you could find packed away on ice. We lived on the best in the market, and spent the rest of the time in fishing and playing poker, chips having very thoughtfully been provided. On the night of the tenth day, at midnight, we were all taken ashore where Watkins met us and signed us to our contracts.

The players were only later presented with their accumulated mail which included scores of offers from other clubs. A writer in the Detroit Free Press later noted: "Detroit magnates showed some inside baseball brains and great finessing in sending the players away from all tempters for that period when they belonged to no club."

Once at Detroit, McGuire hit .190 in 121 at bats and served as the backup for catcher Charlie Bennett; Bennett caught 62 games and McGuire 31. While with the Wolverines, McGuire was reunited with Lady Baldwin, the "snakeball" pitcher who he had caught in Hastings. Despite the infusion of talent from Indianapolis, the Wolverines finished in sixth place with a 41–67 record.

=== Philadelphia Quakers ===
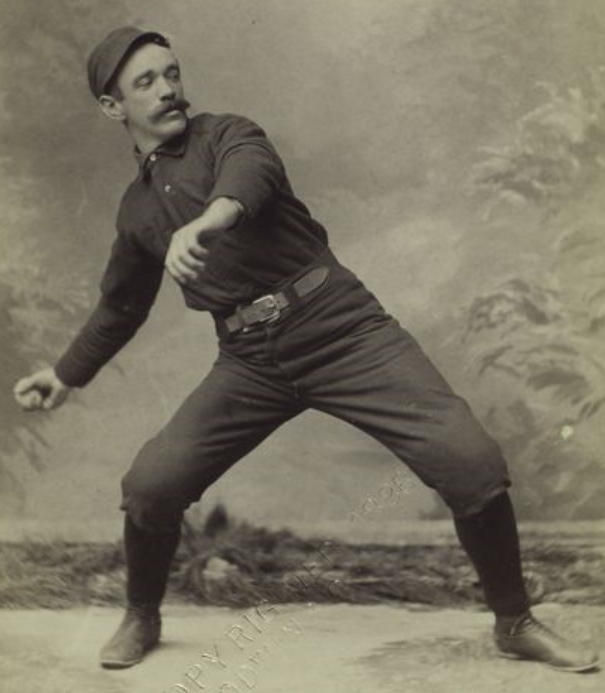
Gilbert & Bacon photograph of McGuire

In November 1885, the Wolverines returned McGuire to league control, and he was then acquired by the Philadelphia Quakers in January 1886. McGuire played with the Quakers for two full seasons.

In 1886, McGuire caught 49 games for the Quakers, two more than the team's other principal catcher Jack Clements. The 1886 season was McGuire's first in the major leagues with a winning ball club, as the Quakers finished in fourth place in the National League with a 71–43 record.

In 1887, McGuire and Clements again split the catching duties for the Quakers, with 41 and 59 games, respectively. McGuire improved dramatically as a batter in 1887. After compiling a .198 batting average in 1886, McGuire hit .307 in 150 at bats. The team also improved to second place with a 75–48 record.

McGuire began the 1888 season with the Quakers. However, on June 30, 1888, he was released by the Quakers after batting .333 in 12 games and 51 at bats.

=== Cleveland, Toronto and Rochester ===
On July 2, 1888, McGuire signed as a free agent with the Detroit Wolverines. He appeared in only three games for Detroit, had no hits in 13 at bats, and was released on August 1, 1888. In late August 1888, McGuire met and signed with Tom Loftus, the manager of the Cleveland Blues of the National League. The Cleveland Plain Dealer reported at the time: "He will strengthen the team a good deal, especially in batting. Jim was a little careless as to his condition early in the season and Harry Wright released him because he had three other cheaper catchers. . . . At this time he is in perfect condition and has given a fine sample of his work in the three games against Kansas City." McGuire appeared in 26 games for Cleveland at the end of the 1888 season, batting .255 in 94 at bats.

In early February 1889, McGuire was released by Cleveland and signed by the Toronto Canucks of the International League. McGuire appeared in 93 games for Toronto and hit .282 with 72 runs scored, 42 extra base hits and 29 stolen bases. (An account published at the end of the 1889 season stated that McGuire hit .300 at Toronto and caught 92 games).

In February 1890, the Rochester Broncos of the American Association purchased McGuire from Toronto. In his return to the major leagues, McGuire appeared in 87 games for Rochester, 71 as a catcher, 15 at first base, three in the outfield and one as a pitcher. He hit .299 with a .356 on-base percentage, .408 slugging average and 53 RBIs. Prior to the 1890 season, McGuire had never earned a Wins Above Replacement (WAR) rating even as high as 1.0; his 1890 season received a 2.7 WAR rating. His defensive play also blossomed in 1890 with a 0.9 Defensive WAR rating – the only season in McGuire's long career in which he ranked among the top ten Defensive WAR ratings in his league.

=== The "Deacon" ===
In The New Bill James Historical Baseball Abstract, sports historian Bill James wrote that McGuire was called Deacon, "because he didn't drink and carouse", like other players of his era. To the contrary, a biographical sketch of McGuire published in 1901 stated that McGuire had been a heavy drinker for much of his career, though he did later become a "teetotaler." The sketch noted:

McGuire's career, as will be noted, has been a somewhat checkered one and not without its ups and downs. His downs, for the most part, were due to an acquaintance he early formed with the Hon. John Barleycorn, and his association with this noted gentleman led to frequent and divers bouts with one Ben Booze who invariably gave Mac the worst of it and came near causing his downfall. It was not until he quit these gentlemen entirely that the true worth of the man permanently asserted itself and his flight into fame was continued.

Another account, published in Sports Illustrated 1984, stated that McGuire's Brooklyn teammates gave him the nickname in 1900 because he was "so straight-arrow" and had never been fined or ejected from a game. Multiple accounts support the widely publicized claim that he was never fined or ejected from a game and describe McGuire as "placid, easy-going, hard-working and thoroughly conscientious."

However, the origin of the "Deacon" nickname appears to date back to 1896. In February of that year, The Sporting Life, a national baseball newspaper, reported a dispatch from Michigan that McGuire "has experienced religion at a revival meeting and is thinking of giving up baseball and devote his time to preaching, perhaps." The Sporting Life closed with this observation: " If Mac felt bent on doing missionary work his duty is to remain right where he is. But he will be back next April doing just as brilliant work behind the bat as last year. He will have no redress, however, if he is addressed hereafter as 'Deacon' McGuire."

=== Washington Senators ===
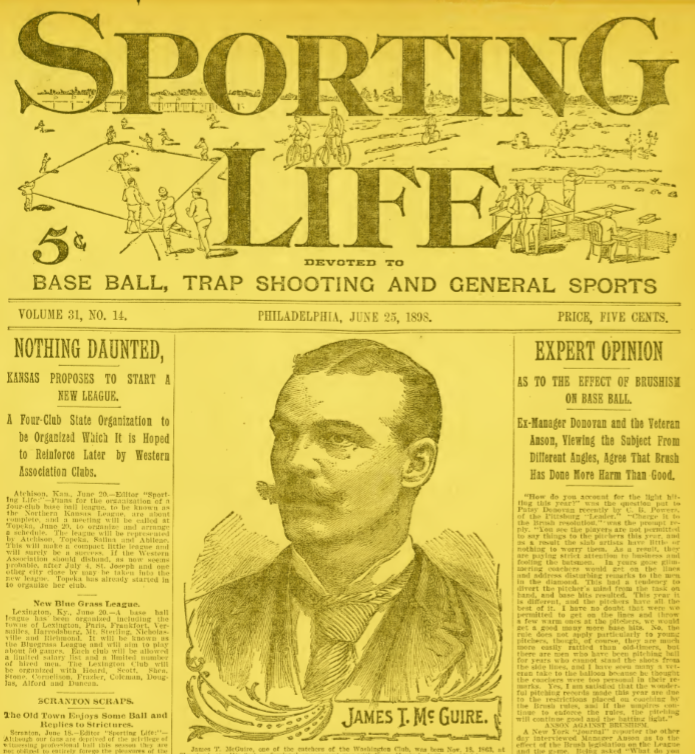
McGuire on the cover of Sporting Life, June 1898

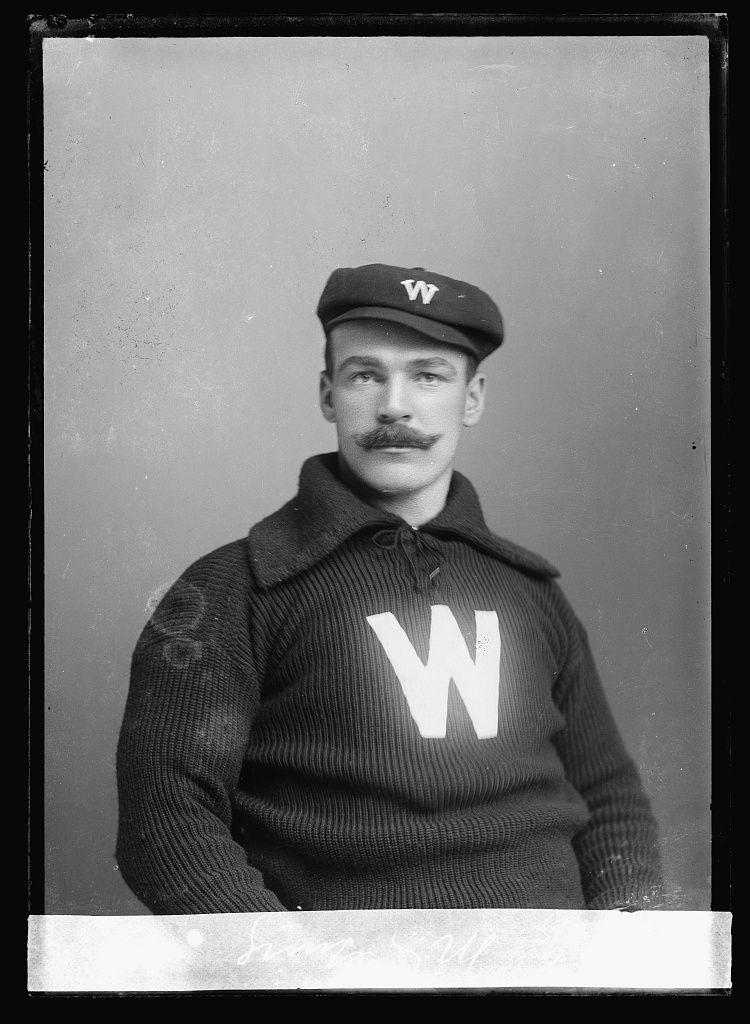
Deacon McGuire in Washington Senators uniform. Photographed by C. M. Bell studio.

In February 1891, McGuire jumped from the Rochester Broncos to the Washington Statesmen. He played the next nine seasons in a Washington uniform.

During the 1891 season, McGuire appeared in 114 games for the Statesmen, including 98 as a catcher and 18 in the outfield. He compiled a .303 batting average and, with the boost from 43 bases on balls and 10 times hit by pitch, a .382 on-base percentage. For the second consecutive season, he earned a 2.7 WAR rating – a level he would exceed only once in his career. Focusing solely on offense, his Offensive WAR rating in 1891 was 3.3 – the only time he ranked among the top ten Offensive WAR ratings in his league. Defensively, McGuire led the American Association's catchers with 130 assists, 56 errors, 204 stolen bases allowed and 129 runners caught stealing. Despite McGuire's efforts, the Statesmen finished the 1891 season in last place in the American Association with a 44–91 record.

In 1892, the Statesmen were admitted to the National League and renamed the Senators. The Senators finished the season in 10th place (out of 12 teams) with a 58–93 record. McGuire's batting average, ever erratic, dropped 71 points from the prior year to .232. However, McGuire had almost as many bases on balls (61) as hits (73), giving him a more than respectable .360 on-base percentage. Factoring in all of his contributions, McGuire received a 2.4 WAR rating for 1892.

In 1893, McGuire caught only 50 games and, despite the limited playing time, ranked second in the National League's catchers with 27 errors. The 1893 season also generated McGuire's worst WAR rating (0.4) of the decade. The Senators as a team also suffered in 1893, finishing in 12th (last) place with a 40–89 record.

The Senators rebounded only slightly in 1894, finishing in 11th place with a 45–87 record. McGuire, on the other hand, improved markedly. His batting average jumped 49 points to .306, and his WAR rating increased to 1.5. Defensively, he led the league with 278 stolen bases allowed and finished second among the league's catchers with 114 assists, 127 runners caught stealing, 36 errors and 27 passed balls.

McGuire had the best season of his career in 1895 as he hit .336 with 48 extra bases hits (including 10 home runs), 97 RBIs and 17 stolen bases. His WAR rating of 4.0 was, by far, the highest of his career. Defensively, he set a new major league record by catching all 133 games. The Sporting News in October 1895 called McGuire's 133 games the "record of records":

Catcher Jim McGuire's correct record of League games caught in this season is 133, 128 of which appear in the standing of the club, four were tie games and one the postponed Boston game. He is to-day in excellent condition. This is the record of records in the league, and many a year will roll by before it is equaled."

He also led the National League's catchers with 312 putouts, 180 assists, 40 errors, 12 double plays turned, 28 passed balls, 293 stolen bases allowed, and 189 runners caught stealing. Even with McGuire having his best season, the Senators continued to wallow near the bottom of the National League, finishing the 1895 season in 10th place with a 43–85 record.

In 1896, McGuire had another good season, and the Senators again finished near the bottom of the standings, in ninth place with a 58–73 record. McGuire hit .321, earning a 2.4 WAR rating. Defensively, he led the league's catchers in multiple categories for the second consecutive year, totaling 98 games at catcher (1st), 349 putouts (1st), 87 assists (2nd), 30 errors (1st), 14 double plays (1st), 205 stolen bases allowed (1st), and 97 runners caught stealing (2nd).

The 1897 season was one of modest improvement for the Senators, finishing in sixth place with a 61–71 record. McGuire appeared in fewer games, 73 at catcher and six at first base, compiled a .343 batting average (the highest of his career), and earned a 2.5 WAR rating.

In 1898, the Senators' improvement dissipated, as they finished in 11th place with a 51–101 record. McGuire appeared in 131 games for the Senators, 93 at catcher and 37 at first base. His batting average dropped by 75 points under the prior year to .268 with a WAR rating of 1.6. McGuire was also asked to serve as player-manager during the latter half of the 1898 season, compiling a record of 21–47 in the final 68 games of the season.

By 1899, McGuire was 35 years old and the ninth oldest player in the National League. He began the year for the ninth consecutive season with an overmatched Washington team that finished in 11th place. During the first half of the season, McGuire's performance ebbed, earning a 0.8 WAR rating.

=== Brooklyn Superbas ===
On July 14, 1899, McGuire received good news; he had been traded to the Brooklyn Superbas, a team managed by Ned Hanlon and competing for the National League pennant. The Brooklyn Daily Eagle praised the trade: "McGuire has always been looked upon as one of the best catchers in the league . . . he has no superior as a coacher of pitchers and for steady and uninterrupted work." The Washington correspondent for the Sporting Life wrote that the trade "marked the passing of the most consistent and reliable player that ever wore a Washington uniform" and called McGuire "the backbone of the Washington team."

Playing for a winning ball club for the first time in a decade, McGuire caught 46 games and blossomed. His batting average bounced back to .318 with a .385 on-base percentage, .446 slugging average and 1.4 WAR rating. The team finished strong with the addition of McGuire, compiling a 39–14 record after August 12 and winning the National League pennant by eight games.

In 1900, McGuire shared catching responsibility with Duke Farrell, McGuire handling 69 games at the position and Farrell 76. McGuire compiled a .286 batting average, .348 on-base percentage and 1.2 WAR rating. His performance helped the Superbas win their second consecutive pennant with an 82–54 record. During one game in 1900, McGuire threw out seven runners attempting to steal second base, caught another "asleep on second and nipped still another slumbering off third."

McGuire resumed his role as the Superbas' number one catcher in 1901. He caught 81 games and compiled a .296 batting average, .342 on-base percentage and 1.6 WAR rating. The Superbas remained competitive, finishing in third place with a 79–57 record.

=== Challenging the "reserve clause" ===
In March 1902, McGuire jumped to the still new American League, signing a two-year with the Detroit Tigers. The Brooklyn club sued McGuire for breaching his contract to play there and sought an injunction prohibiting him from playing anywhere else. The case went to trial in June 1902 in Philadelphia federal court. Brooklyn club president Charles Ebbets testified in court "to the extraordinary qualities of McGuire as a catcher." McGuire argued that his contract with Brooklyn was invalid on the ground that the "reserve clause" was a violation of the Sherman Anti-Trust Act.

After hearing the evidence, Judge George M. Dallas ruled in favor of McGuire, holding that the Brooklyn contract was unenforceable due to a lack of mutuality, and because Brooklyn had failed to prove that McGuire's services were unique and irreplaceable. Judge Dallas' opinion, in part, stated:

The contract upon which this suit is founded provides that the party of the first part (the plaintiff) may end and determine all its liabilities and obligations thereunder upon giving the party of the second part (the defendant) ten days' notice of its option and intention to do so, and in Marble Company vs. Itipley, 10 Wall. 339, it was distinctly held that a contract which the plaintiff may abandon at any time on giving one year's notice is not enforceable in equity.... In short, I am of opinion that the decision in Marble Company against Ripley is binding upon this Court and is determinative of the present motion. A preliminary injunction should not be awarded in any case where the proofs leave the mind of the Court in serious doubt respecting the plaintiff's asserted right, and the testimony and affidavits submitted for and against the present application do not establish with reasonable certainty that the breach of contract of which the plaintiff complains could not be adequately compensated at law. The evidence adduced is by no means conclusive upon the question whether the services which the defendant contracted to render were so unique and peculiar that they could not be performed and substantially as well by others engaged in professional ball playing, who might be easily be obtained to take his place. The motion for a preliminary injunction is denied.

The Brooklyn correspondent for The Sporting News wrote that the court's decision did not change the fact that "McGuire played the Brooklyn management a low and cowardly trick", suggested that the team sue McGuire for damages, and opined that the Brooklyn public did not care "two cents whether McGuire never comes back." In 1914, the McGuire case became a significant precedent that was relied upon by players and Federal League officials when that league sought to entice players to its ranks.

=== Detroit Tigers ===
With the legal proceedings at an end, McGuire shared catching responsibility in Detroit with Fritz Buelow, McGuire catching 70 games in 1902 and Buelow 63. The Tigers' management valued McGuire not only for his playing ability, but also because his coaching "was figured on to aid greatly in developing the young material" that the Tigers were bringing together. At age 38, McGuire was the fourth oldest player in the American League, his batting average dropped to .227 – his lowest level since 1886 ---, and his WAR rating fell to 0.7. The Tigers finished in seventh place with a 52–83 record.

In February 1903, Ned Hanlon, manager of the Brooklyn club, claimed that Brooklyn still had the reserve rights to McGuire and challenged his contract with Detroit. Hanlon did not issue the threatened order to report for several weeks, then did so in April 1903. In the end, a deal was struck pursuant to which Brooklyn released any claim it had over McGuire.

During the 1903 season, McGuire again shared catching duties with Buelow – 69 games for McGuire and 63 for Buelow. McGuire hit .250 and earned a 1.2 WAR rating. The Tigers finished in fifth place with a 65–71 record.

=== New York Highlanders ===
In February 1904, Detroit sold McGuire to the New York Highlanders. He spent his final years as a full-time player with the Highlanders from 1904 to 1906. In 1904, at age 40, McGuire caught 97 games, his highest tally since 1899. He led the American League's catchers with 11 double plays turned and ranked second in the league with 530 putouts and 120 assists. His batting average fell to .208, but with Willie Keeler batting .343 and Jack Chesbro winning 41 games, the Highlanders compiled a 92–59 and finished one-and-a-half games behind Boston for the American League pennant.

In 1905, McGuire remained New York's number one catcher, appearing in 71 games at the position. He hit .219 and earned a 0.7 WAR rating. By 1906, McGuire, at age 42, was the second oldest player in the league. In his last season as a full-time player, he caught 51 games and hit .299 in 144 at bats.

== Manager and coach ==
=== Boston Red Sox ===
McGuire was hired by the Boston Red Sox in early June 1906 and took over as the team's manager on June 10, 1907. He compiled a 45–61 (.425) record as manager in 1907 and returned in 1908, compiling a 53–62 (.461) record. McGuire also appeared in seven games as a player for Boston, principally as a pinch-hitter, and made three hits, including a home run, and scored a run in five plate appearances. He was released by the Red Sox on August 28, 1908.

Although McGuire's Boston teams did not achieve a winning record, his teams lacked batting strength. He had Cy Young as a pitcher, but his 1907 team finished with the lowest batting average (.234) in the American League. McGuire was credited with having "whipped the bunch of veterans and kids from tailenders into a fighting machine, laying the foundation for the whirlwind team" that went 88–63 in 1909.

=== Cleveland Naps ===
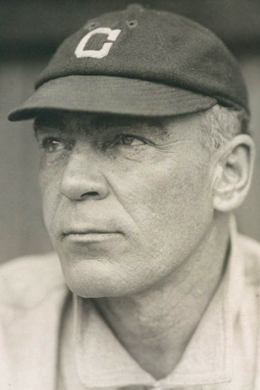
McGuire as manager at Cleveland

On September 18, 1908, McGuire signed as a free agent with the Cleveland Naps and appeared in only one game, at first base. McGuire served principally as a scout for Cleveland in 1908 and the first half of 1909. On August 21, 1909, he was hired as Cleveland's manager, replacing Nap Lajoie. Club officials at the time opined that McGuire "possesses the necessary ginger to bring about a different style of playing." McGuire led the team to a 14–25 (.359) record during the last weeks of the 1909 season. He returned in 1910 and led the team to a 71–81 (.467) record. In 1911, McGuire compiled a 6–11 (.353) record as Cleveland's manager. On May 3, 1911, he resigned as manager and was replaced by George Stovall. In resigning his post, McGuire stated that he was disappointed in the team's showing and hoped that better results could be achieved with a new man in charge.

=== Detroit Tigers ===
In February 1912, McGuire was hired as a pitching coach for the Detroit Tigers. He had been expected to serve as a scout during the regular season, but was assigned in May 1912 to remain with the club as a coach throughout the season, working alongside manager Hughie Jennings. The Sporting Life wrote: "With McGuire and Jennings on the coaching lines the Tigers would be better fortified in this department than any team in the league." In May 1912, when the Detroit players refused to play in protest over the suspension of Ty Cobb for attacking a fan, the club's management was forced to come up with a substitute team for a game in Philadelphia. McGuire took to the field as one of the Tigers' replacement players. He had a hit and scored a run in his final major league game, but the Tigers lost the game by a 24–2 score.

In January 1914, McGuire was assigned to coach Detroit's young pitchers during spring training with the understanding that he would then leave the club to assume "his regular duties as chief of scouts." In 1915, he returned to the Tigers as a scout. In January 1916, Detroit president Frank Navin released McGuire from the position he had held with the club as a scout and coach. McGuire stated at the time that he expected "to devote all his attention to his business In Albion, Mich." (Some accounts indicate that he continued to scout for the Tigers until 1926.)

== Legacy ==
=== Padding the glove ===
In 1936, H. G. Salsinger wrote an article that was published in The Sporting News crediting McGuire as the "first catcher to pad a glove." Salsinger wrote that McGuire "resorted to a primordial method" by stuffing his glove with a piece of raw steak to absorb the shock. Salsinger wrote that manufacturers took a hint from McGuire and began padding catcher's mitts with felt and hair. Salsinger opined that modern catchers "should erect a monument" to repay the debt owed to McGuire's innovation.

McGuire claimed he came up with the idea when he was catching for pitcher Hank O'Day at Toledo in 1884. McGuire said that O'Day "threw the heaviest and hardest ball I ever caught", and that O'Day's pitches "came like a shell from a cannon." McGuire recalled: "The reinforced full-fingered catcher's glove had just come into use the year before. One day on my way to that old Toledo park on Monroe Street, I passed a butcher pounding round steak. It gave me an idea, and I went in and bought a lot of it. I put a piece of it in my glove at the start of every inning, and Hank's pitches beat that steak into a pulp." McGuire's wife recalled her husband using "a piece of beefsteak" and noted: "At game's end it would be hamburger."

=== Gnarled hands ===
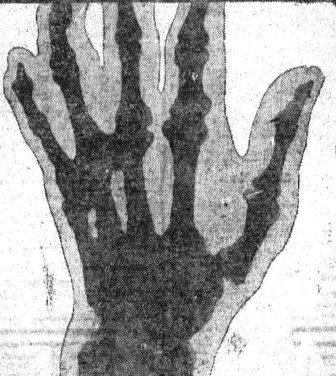
McGuire's gnarled, knotted left hand, x-rayed in 1906

McGuire played before the advent of most modern protective equipment, and his fingers were reportedly "gnarled, broken, bent, split and crooked" by the end of his career. One account, published in 1901, emphasized the physical beating:

A picture of McGuire's hands would be an interesting and wonderful exhibit. The maimed and misshapen members which he will carry with him after he quits the game and to the grave are mute reminders of many a foul ticked off the bat, a wild thrown ball stopped with the finger tips after a leap into the air, or a low one clawed up out of the roots of the plate, and an occasional one caught full on the end of a digit, splitting the flesh and nail.

In 1904, former teammate Sam Crane called McGuire "a wonder – physically and mentally" and "a human octopus." Crane also described McGuire's hands:

His big, brawny, strong hands, now grotesquely disfigured by the continuous battering they have received from the viciously wicked inshoots, curves, slants and benders of the speediest pitchers known in the long history of the game, have acted as an unflinchable barrier to the accumulation of momentum that if concentrated would have an irresistible force capable of crushing a battleship or of pulverizing a backstop construction of Harveyized steel armor plate.

In 1907, newspapers across the country published an x-ray of McGuire's left hand (pictured, above at right), showing "36 breaks, twists or bumps all due to baseball accidents." The text accompanying the widely published photograph noted: "When the picture was developed the photographer was amazed to see the knots, like gnarled places on an old oak tree, around the joints, and numerous spots showing old breaks. In several joints the bones are flattened and pushed to the side."

=== Career statistics and records ===
Despite the injuries and physical demands of a catcher's duties, McGuire showed remarkable longevity. In 26 years in the major leagues, McGuire compiled a .278 career batting average, .341 on-base percentage and .372 slugging percentage. He appeared in 1,781 games and totaled 770 runs scored, 1,750 hits, 300 doubles, 79 triples, 45 home runs, 840 RBIs, 118 stolen bases and 515 bases on balls.

McGuire's longevity enabled him to set numerous major league records, some of which are set forth below:

- Most seasons. McGuire played in 26 major league seasons. That remained a major league record for many decades. Tommy John tied the record in 1989, and Nolan Ryan exceeded it in 1993 when he appeared in his 27th major league season.
- Most teams. McGuire played for 11 different major league teams. That stood as a major league record until 2000 when Mike Morgan played for his 12th major league team.
- Caught stealing. McGuire still holds the major league records for most runners caught stealing in a season (189 in 1895) and in a career (1,459).
- Stolen bases allowed. While McGuire threw out a lot of base runners, he also allowed a lot of stolen bases. He holds the current major league record for most stolen bases allowed in a season (293 in 1895) and in a career (2,529).
- Assists as catcher. McGuire broke the record for most career assists by a catcher in 1901. His final total of 1,860 assists remains the current major league record.
- Games as catcher. McGuire set both season and career records for games at catcher. He set the season record in 1895 when he appeared in 133 games, and he became the career leader in 1900 by breaking Wilbert Robinson's record of 1,108 games. His final tally of 1,612 games as catcher remained a major league record until it was broken in 1925 by Ray Schalk.
- Putouts as catcher. McGuire broke the career record for putouts as catcher in 1901. His final total of 6,856 putouts remained the major league record until it, too, was broken in 1925 by Ray Schalk.
- Double plays as catcher. In 1904, McGuire broke Chief Zimmer's record for most double plays turned as catcher. McGuire's final total of 143 double plays remained the major league record until 1920 when it was broken by Steve O'Neill.

In The New Bill James Historical Baseball Abstract, sports historian Bill James ranked McGuire as the 40th best catcher of all time. The only 19th century catcher ranked higher than McGuire was Buck Ewing, whom James ranked 17th.

== Family and later years ==
McGuire was married in 1893 to May K. Huxford. They had no children.

Even before retiring from baseball, McGuire made his home in Albion, Michigan, and had developed other business interests there. By 1901, McGuire and his brother owned a "well paying wet goods emporium" and an ice business in Albion. The "wet goods emporium" appears to refer to a saloon in Albion known as "McGuire Brothers", originally located at 204 S. Superior St., which moved in 1912 to 103 West Porter Street. McGuire worked in the saloon during the off-season, and his brother (George) operated it year round. In 1915, Albion "went dry", and McGuire Brothers became a restaurant and "sample room" and eventually closed. In 1906, McGuire and his wife also purchased a flour mill on the Kalamazoo River near Albion.

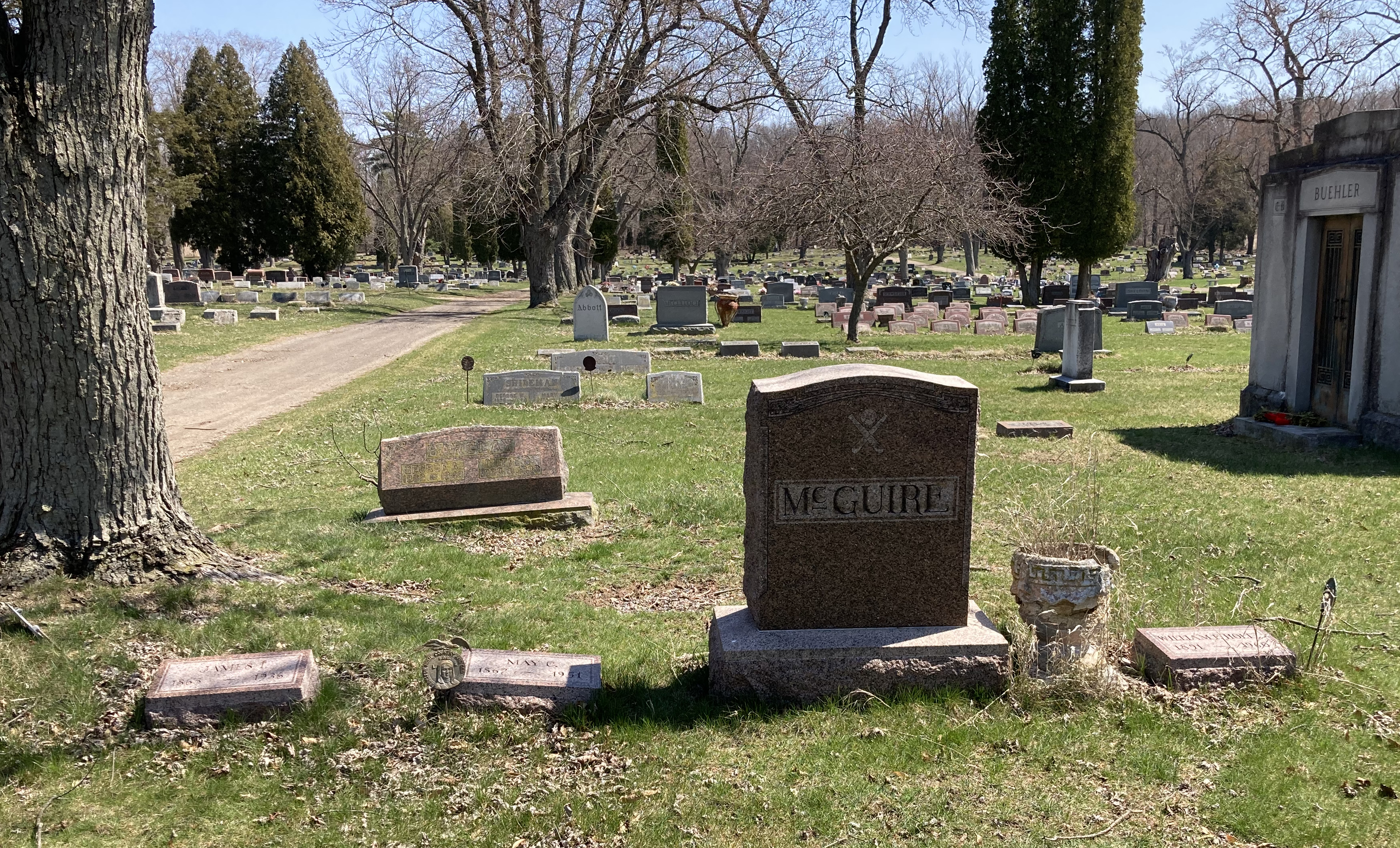
McGuire's grave at Riverside Cemetery

In 1914, a man who was believed to have gone insane twice attempted to kill McGuire. The first attempt was at McGuire's cabin in Duck Lake, Michigan, using both an axe and a revolver. The second attempt was at McGuire's home in Albion, using a repeating rifle. McGuire was reported to have narrowly escaped death.

After retiring from baseball, McGuire returned to his home in Albion. He coached the Albion College baseball team in 1926 and worked as a chicken farmer. McGuire died in 1936 at age 72. The cause of death was pneumonia, that developed after he suffered a stroke at his chicken ranch in Duck Lake, Michigan. He was buried at Riverside Cemetery in Albion.

== Managerial record ==
| Team | Year | Regular season | | | | | Postseason | | | |
| Team | Year | Games | Won | Lost | Win % | Finish | Won | Lost | Win % | Result |
|---|---|---|---|---|---|---|---|---|---|---|
| WSH | 1898 | 68 | 21 | 47 | .309 | interim | – | – | – | – |
| WAS total | | 68 | 21 | 47 | .309 | | 0 | 0 | – | |
| BOA | 1907 | 106 | 45 | 61 | .425 | 7th in AL | – | – | – | – |
| BOS | 1908 | 115 | 53 | 62 | .461 | released | – | – | – | – |
| BOA/ BOS total | | 221 | 98 | 123 | .443 | | 0 | 0 | – | |
| CLE | 1909 | 39 | 14 | 25 | .359 | 6th in AL | – | – | – | – |
| CLE | 1910 | 152 | 71 | 81 | .467 | 5th in AL | – | – | – | – |
| CLE | 1911 | 17 | 6 | 11 | .353 | resigned | – | – | – | – |
| CLE total | | 208 | 91 | 117 | .438 | | 0 | 0 | – | |
| Total | | 497 | 210 | 287 | .423 | | 0 | 0 | – | |

== See also ==
- List of Major League Baseball player–managers
- List of Major League Baseball players who played in four decades
