= Ed Gastfield =

American baseball player (1865–1899)

- Catcher
- Born: August 1, 1865; Chicago
- Died: December 1, 1899 (aged 34); Chicago
- Batted: Right Threw: Unknown

MLB debut
- August 13, 1884, for the Detroit Wolverines

Last MLB appearance
- July 11, 1885, for the Chicago White Stockings

MLB statistics
- Batting average: .068
- Home runs: 0
- Runs batted in: 2
- Stats at Baseball Reference

Teams
- Detroit Wolverines (1884–1885); Chicago White Stockings (1885)

Edward Gastfield (August 1, 1865 – December 1, 1899) was an American professional baseball player in the 1880s. He appeared in 25 games in Major League Baseball, principally as a catcher, for the Detroit Wolverines in 1884, and in one game for the Chicago White Stockings in July 1885. He compiled a career batting average of .068 with 37 strikeouts in 88 at bats.

== Early years ==
Gastfield was born in Chicago in 1865.

== Professional baseball player ==
Gastfield got his start in baseball playing for the West End team in the Chicago City League. He then went with pitcher Charlie Getzien to play for the ball club at Grand Rapids, Michigan. Gastfield was a catcher for Grand Rapids in the first half of the 1884 season.

In August 1884, Gastfield and Getzien joined the Detroit Wolverines, both players making their debut on August 13, 1884. Gastfield appeared in 23 games for the 1884 Wolverines, compiling a .073 batting average with 34 strikeouts in 84 at bats. He began the 1885 season with Detroit, but appeared in only one game for the team. He was released by Detroit at the end of May 1885, and The Sporting Life reported at the time that he did "acceptable work" as catcher, but was "very weak" as a batter.

Gastfield played one game for the Chicago White Stockings on July 11, 1885. In late July 1885, The Sporting Life reported that Chicago manager Cap Anson "hasn't much confidence in Gastfield's ability." Gastfield went hitless in six at bats during the 1885 season. In September 1885, The Sporting Life reported that Gastfield "seems to have disappeared from public notice."

Gastfield also played minor league baseball for the Oshkosh ball club in Oshkosh, Wisconsin, in 1886 and 1887. In the spring of 1887, the Oshkosh correspondent to The Sporting Life wrote: "He is an A No. 1 back stop, and a good all-round player, distinguishing himself especially on first base. As a thrower and base-runner he has few, if any, superiors. He is a hard worker and plays ball first, last and all the time. He is considered quite an acquisition to the club, especially as he is very popular and possesses considerable drawing power both at home and abroad." He also played for the ball club in Omaha, Nebraska, in 1888.

== Death ==
Gastfield died in December 1899 at the home of his father, Charles Gastfield, at 635 North Campbell Avenue in Chicago. He was age 34 at the time of his death.
