= Bill Geiss =

American baseball player (1858–1924)

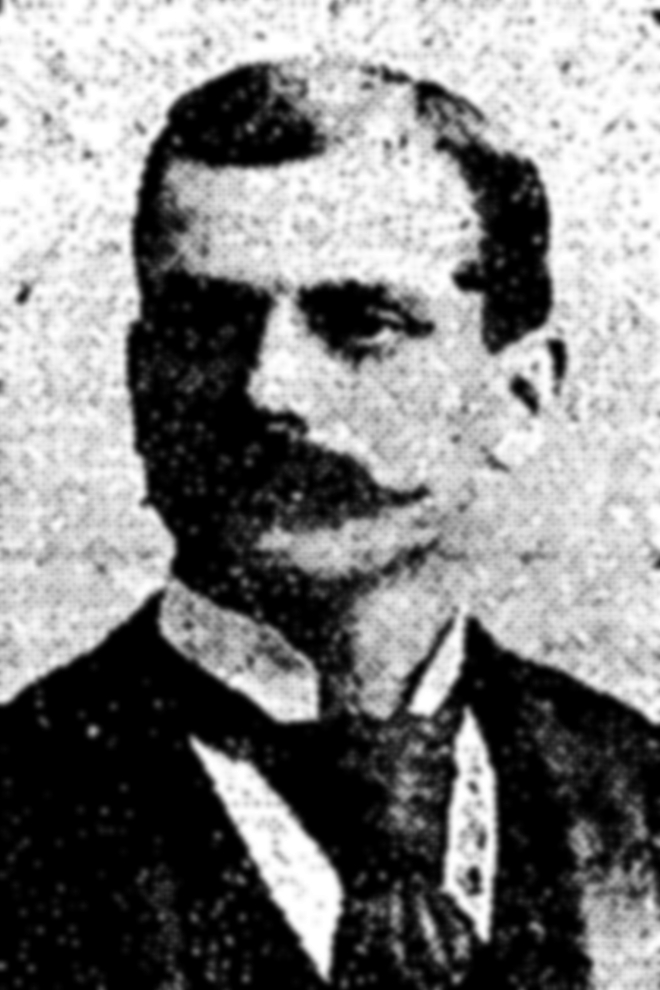
- Second baseman / Pitcher
- Born: July 15, 1858; Chicago, Illinois, US
- Died: September 18, 1924 (aged 66); Chicago, Illinois, US
- Batted: Unknown Threw: Unknown

MLB debut
- July 19, 1882, for the Baltimore Orioles

Last MLB appearance
- August 13, 1884, for the Detroit Wolverines

MLB statistics
- Games played: 88
- W–L record: 4-9
- Earned run average: 5.27
- Stats at Baseball Reference

Teams
- Baltimore Orioles (1882); Detroit Wolverines (1884)

William J. Geiss (July 15, 1858 – September 18, 1924) was an American professional baseball player from 1882 to 1894. He played two seasons in Major League Baseball, as a pitcher for the 1882 Baltimore Orioles, and as a second baseman for the 1884 Detroit Wolverines. He appeared in 93 major league games, 73 as a second baseman and 13 as a pitcher. He also played 11 seasons of minor league baseball for at least 17 different minor league clubs from 1883 to 1894.

== Early years ==
Geiss was born in 1858 in Chicago, Illinois. His parents, John Geis and Mary (Meyer) Geis, were both immigrants from Germany.

Geiss's younger brother, Emil Geiss, also played professional baseball.

== Professional baseball ==
=== Baltimore Orioles ===
Geiss made his debut in Major League Baseball with the Baltimore Orioles on July 19, 1882, at age 24. He appeared in 13 games as a pitcher for the Orioles and also appeared in four games as an outfielder. As a pitcher he compiled a 4-9 (.308) record with a 4.80 earned run average (ERA) in 95-2/3 innings pitched.

=== Detroit Wolverines ===
After spending the 1883 season with the Fort Wayne Hoosiers in the Northwestern League, Geiss joined the Detroit Wolverines in 1884. He appeared in 75 games for the Wolverines, including 73 games at second base and one games as a pitcher. He compiled a .177 batting average and struck out 60 times in 284 at bats. In his one game as pitcher, he threw five relief innings and allowed 14 hits, two bases on balls, and 16 runs, eight of them earned, for an ERA of 14.40. His Wins Above Replacement (WAR) rating for the 1884 season was -1.4. Geiss appeared in his last major league game on August 13, 1884.

=== Minor leagues ===
Although his major league career ended in 1884, Geiss continued to play in the minor leagues, principally as a second baseman, for another 10 years. A newspaper story in 1891 stated that he had "always been considered a good, reliable player on second." An account published in 1892 in Sporting Life stated that he "has always ranked very high among the second basemen in whatever league he played", and "is one of the most accurate men on ground balls that ever played second, and he can play equally well at third or short field."

Giess appeared in at least 560 minor league games. Although records are incomplete, he stole at least 105 bases, including 36 with New Orleans in 1887. Geiss's minor league career saw him play for at least 17 different teams in 10 years, including stints with Birmingham, Alabama (1885), Omaha, Nebraska (1885), Macon, Georgia (1886), the New Orleans Pelicans (1887), Charleston, South Carolina (1888), Sioux City, Iowa (1888), Kalamazoo and Flint, Michigan (1889), Ottawa, Illinois (1890–91), Joliet, Illinois (1891), Montgomery, Alabama (1892), Chattanooga, Tennessee (1892), Nashville, Tennessee (1893), Atlanta (1894), and Savannah Modocs (1894).

== Later years ==
Geiss was married to Anna Geiss and worked as a laborer in his later years. He died in 1924 at age 66 in Chicago. He was buried at St. Boniface Cemetery in that city.
