= Joe Farrell (baseball) =

American baseball player (1857–1893)

- Third baseman
- Born: 1857; Brooklyn, New York, U.S.
- Died: April 17, 1893 (aged 35–36); Brooklyn, New York, U.S.
- Batted: Right Threw: Unknown

MLB debut
- May 1, 1882, for the Detroit Wolverines

Last MLB appearance
- August 29, 1886, for the Baltimore Orioles

MLB statistics
- Batting average: .232
- RBI: 132
- Home runs: 5
- Stats at Baseball Reference

Teams
- Detroit Wolverines (1882–1884); Baltimore Orioles (1886)

Joseph F. Farrell (1857 – April 17, 1893) was an American professional baseball player whose career spanned from 1880 to 1888.

Farrell was born in Brooklyn, New York, in 1857. He played four seasons in Major League Baseball, principally as a third baseman, for the Detroit Wolverines of the National League from 1882 to 1884 and for the Baltimore Orioles of the American Association in 1886. In 1883, he led the National League in games played at third base (101) and ranked second among the league's third basemen with 248 assists and third with 13 double plays and a range factor of 3.55.

Across all four of his major league seasons, Farrell appeared in 353 games, 280 as a third baseman and 63 as a second baseman, nine as a shortstop and two as an outfielder. He compiled a .232 career batting average, scored 187 runs, and totaled 63 extra base hits, including 15 triples and five home runs. Farrell also played four seasons of minor league baseball.

After a long illness, Farrell died in Brooklyn on April 17, 1893, at age 36. On April 26, 1893, a baseball game was played at Brooklyn's Eastern Park between the Brooklyn Superbas and an old-timers team to raise money for Farrell's mother. Over 2,000 tickets were sold.
