= Pete Wood =

Canadian baseball player (1867–1923)

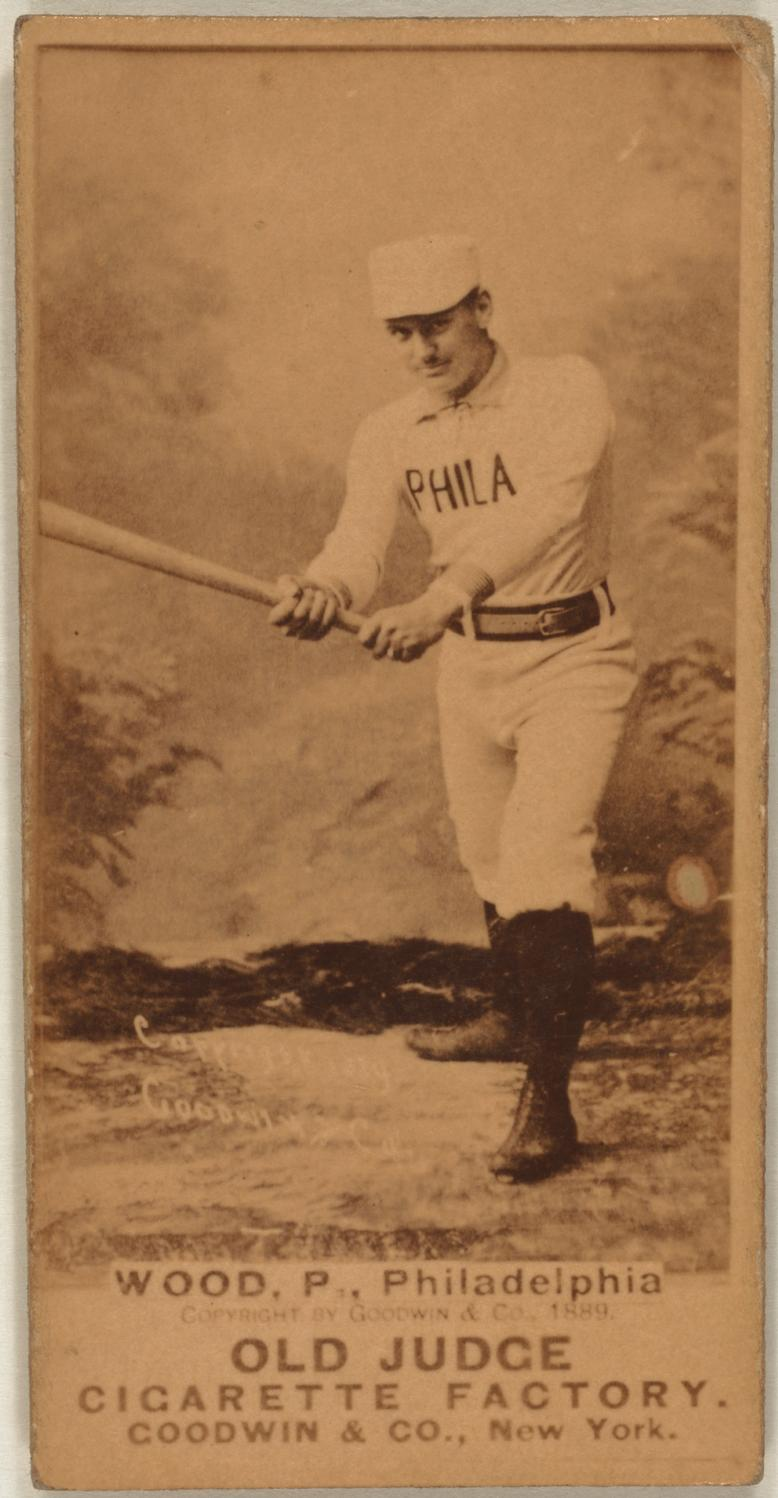
- Pitcher
- Born: February 1, 1867; Dundas, Ontario
- Died: March 15, 1923 (aged 56); Chicago
- Batted: Unknown Threw: Right

MLB debut
- July 15, 1885, for the Buffalo Bisons

Last MLB appearance
- September 7, 1889, for the Philadelphia Quakers

MLB statistics
- Win–loss record: 9-16
- Strikeouts: 46
- Earned run average: 4.51
- Stats at Baseball Reference

Teams
- Buffalo Bisons (1885); Philadelphia Quakers (1889)

Peter Burke Wood (1 February 1867 – 15 March 1923) was a Canadian-American professional baseball pitcher. A right-hander, he played parts of two seasons in Major League Baseball, 1885 and 1889.

A native of Dundas, Ontario, Wood made his major league debut on 15 July 1885 with the Buffalo Bisons, the team which also featured on its roster his brother, Fred. The brothers were with the team for the remainder of the season, at the end of which Fred retired. Four years later, Wood returned to Major League Baseball, playing for the Philadelphia Quakers in 1889. His final game with the team was on September 7.

Pete Wood died in Chicago six weeks past his 56th birthday.
