= Henry Buker =

American baseball player (1859–1899)

- Shortstop/Outfielder
- Born: 1859; Portland, Maine
- Died: August 10, 1899 (aged 39–40); Chicago, Illinois
- Batted: Unknown Threw: Unknown

MLB debut
- June 11, 1884, for the Detroit Wolverines

Last MLB appearance
- August 4, 1884, for the Detroit Wolverines

MLB statistics
- Batting average: .135
- Home runs: 0
- Runs batted in: 3
- Stats at Baseball Reference

Teams
- Detroit Wolverines (1884)

Henry L. Buker (1859–1899) was an American professional baseball shortstop and right fielder and played one season with the 1884 Detroit Wolverines. It is unknown what hand he batted and threw with. He was born in Portland, Maine and died in Chicago, Illinois. He is buried in Rosehill Cemetery in Chicago.
