= Henry Jones (second baseman) =

American baseball player (1857–1955)

- Second baseman / Outfielder
- Born: May 10, 1857; New York City, U.S.
- Died: May 31, 1955 (aged 98); Manistee, Michigan, U.S.
- Batted: Switch Threw: Unknown

MLB debut
- August 20, 1884, for the Detroit Wolverines

Last MLB appearance
- October 14, 1884, for the Detroit Wolverines

MLB statistics
- Batting average: .220
- Home runs: 0
- Runs batted in: 3
- Stats at Baseball Reference

Teams
- Detroit Wolverines (1884)

Henry Monroe Jones (May 10, 1857 – May 31, 1955) was an American professional baseball player who played second base and outfield in the Major Leagues for the 1884 Detroit Wolverines.

Records
Preceded by Charles Witherow	Oldest recognized verified living baseball player July 3, 1948 – May 31, 1955	Succeeded by John Leighton
