= Mox McQuery =

American baseball player (1861–1900)

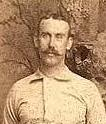
- First baseman
- Born: June 28, 1861; Garrard County, Kentucky, U.S.
- Died: June 12, 1900 (aged 38); Cincinnati, Ohio, U.S.
- Batted: Unknown Threw: Unknown

MLB debut
- August 20, 1884, for the Cincinnati Outlaw Reds

Last MLB appearance
- July 25, 1891, for the Washington Statesmen

MLB statistics
- Batting average: .271
- Home runs: 13
- Runs batted in: 160
- Stats at Baseball Reference

Teams
- Cincinnati Outlaw Reds (1884); Detroit Wolverines (1885); Kansas City Cowboys (1886); Syracuse Stars (1890); Washington Statesmen (1891)

William Thomas "Mox" McQuery (June 28, 1861 – June 12, 1900) was an American Major League Baseball first baseman. He played for the Cincinnati Outlaw Reds (1884) of the Union Association, the Detroit Wolverines (1885) and the Kansas City Cowboys (1886), both of the National League, and the Syracuse Stars (1890) and Washington Statesmen (1891), both of the American Association. He was a native of Garrard County, Kentucky.

On September 28, 1885, he became the second Wolverine (after George Wood) to hit for the cycle, in a 14–2 Detroit win against the Providence Grays at Recreation Park.

In the 1890 season, he finished second on his team and tenth in the league with a .308 batting average. He also had career highs in nine other offensive categories. His career totals include 417 games played, 429 hits, 13 home runs, 160 RBI, 231 runs scored, and a lifetime batting average of .271.

McQuery was a patrol officer for the Covington Police Department when he was killed in the line of duty. He had stopped a horse-drawn streetcar that contained two men wanted for murder. The criminals opened fire, striking him in the chest, and he later died as result of his injuries. "Big Mox" was buried at Linden Grove Cemetery in Covington, Kentucky.

== See also ==
- List of Major League Baseball players to hit for the cycle

Achievements
Preceded by Henry Larkin	Hitting for the cycle September 28, 1885	Succeeded by Fred Dunlap
