= Billy Shindle =

American baseball player (1860–1936)

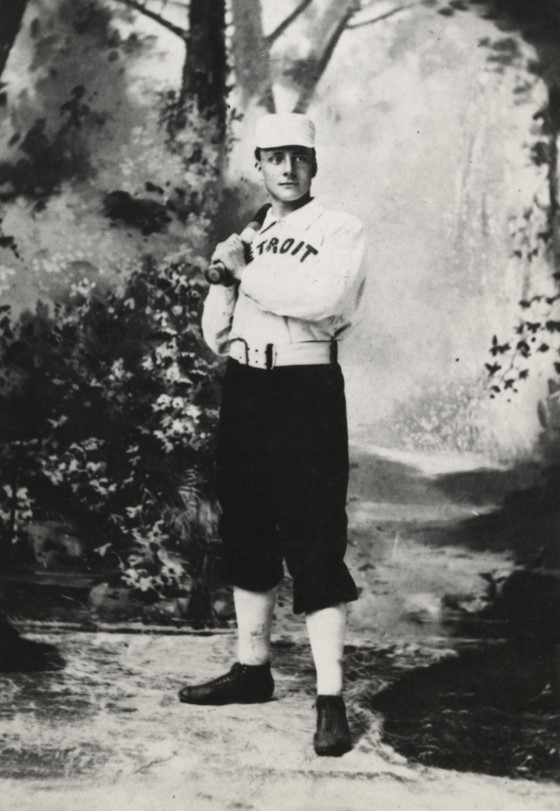
- Third baseman
- Born: December 5, 1860; Gloucester City, New Jersey, U.S.
- Died: June 3, 1936 (aged 75); Lakeland, New Jersey, U.S.
- Batted: Right Threw: Right

MLB debut
- October 5, 1886, for the Detroit Wolverines

Last MLB appearance
- September 17, 1898, for the Brooklyn Bridegrooms

MLB statistics
- Batting average: .269
- Home runs: 31
- Runs batted in: 759
- Stats at Baseball Reference

Teams
- Detroit Wolverines (1886–1887); Baltimore Orioles (1888–1889); Philadelphia Athletics (1890); Philadelphia Phillies (1891); Baltimore Orioles (1892–1893); Brooklyn Grooms/Bridegrooms (1894–1898)

William D. Shindle (December 5, 1860 – June 3, 1936) was an American third baseman in Major League Baseball. He played from 1886 to 1898 for the Detroit Wolverines (1886–87), Baltimore Orioles (1888–89, 1892–93), Philadelphia Athletics (1890), Philadelphia Phillies (1891), and Brooklyn Grooms/Bridegrooms (1894–98). Shindle was born in Gloucester City, New Jersey. He batted and threw right-handed, and he was slightly built at 5 ft 8 in (1.73 m) and 155 pounds.

== Career ==
Shindle's range factor of 4.34 in 1892 for the Baltimore Orioles is the highest rating ever recorded by a third baseman in the history of Major League Baseball. He also had range factors over 4.0 for Baltimore in 1888 and for Philadelphia in 1891.

While his range factor demonstrated his superior speed and ability to get to the ball, Shindle was not as talented at handling the balls once he got to them. In 1890, Shindle played shortstop for Philadelphia in the Players' League and was charged with 122 errors (119 at shortstop and 3 at third base). Shindle's 122 errors in 1890 are tied (with Herman Long in 1889) for the all-time record for most errors by a major league player at any position.

Shindle played third base for the Brooklyn Bridegrooms from 1894 to 1898. His 3.7 lifetime range factor makes him the number one defensive third baseman in Dodgers history. (William F. McNeil, "The Dodgers Encyclopedia," p. 102)

In 1890 (the same year he set the all time errors record), Shindle batted a career-high .322, led the Players League with 282 total bases, and was fourth in the league with 10 home runs. In 1894, the 34-year-old Shindle hit .296 with 94 runs scored and 96 runs batted in. His MLB career ended after the 1898 season at age 38.

In his 13-season career, Shindle was a .269 hitter (1564-for-5815) in 1424 games, with 226 doubles, 97 triples, 31 home runs, 993 runs scored, 759 runs batted in, and 318 stolen bases.

Shindle died in Lakeland, New Jersey at age 75. He was ranked as the 95th best third baseman of all time in the 2001 book The New Bill James Historical Baseball Abstract.

== See also ==
- List of Major League Baseball single-game hits leaders
