= Walt Walker =

American baseball player (1860–1922)

- Catcher
- Born: March 12, 1860; Berlin Center, Michigan, US
- Died: February 28, 1922 (aged 61); Pontiac, Michigan, US
- Batted: Unknown Threw: Right

MLB debut
- May 8, 1884, for the Detroit Wolverines

Last MLB appearance
- May 8, 1884, for the Detroit Wolverines

MLB statistics
- Batting average: .250
- Home runs: 0
- Runs batted in: 0
- Stats at Baseball Reference

Teams
- Detroit Wolverines (1884)

Walter S. Walker (March 12, 1860 – February 28, 1922) was an American Major League Baseball player. Walker played for Detroit Wolverines in the 1884 season. He played just one game in his career, having one hit in four at-bats, with one run scored.

He was born in Berlin Center, Michigan and died in Pontiac, Michigan.
