= Milt Scott =

American baseball player (1861–1938)

- First baseman
- Born: January 17, 1861; Chicago, Illinois, US
- Died: November 3, 1938 (aged 77); Baltimore, Maryland, US
- Batted: Right Threw: Unknown

MLB debut
- September 30, 1882, for the Chicago White Stockings

Last MLB appearance
- October 14, 1886, for the Baltimore Orioles

MLB statistics
- Batting average: .228
- Home runs: 5
- Runs batted in: 132
- Stats at Baseball Reference

Teams
- Chicago White Stockings (1882); Detroit Wolverines (1884–85); Pittsburgh Alleghenys (1885); Baltimore Orioles (1886)

Milton Parker Scott (January 17, 1861 – November 3, 1938), nicknamed "Mikado Milt", was an American professional baseball player whose career spanned from 1882 to 1889. He appeared in 341 Major League Baseball games over four seasons as a first baseman for the Chicago White Stockings (one game, 1882), Detroit Wolverines (148 games, 1884–85), Pittsburgh Alleghenys (55 games, 1885) and Baltimore Orioles (137 games, 1886). He compiled a .228 batting average with 42 doubles, 10 triples, five home runs, and 132 RBIs.

== Early years ==
Scott was born in 1861 at Chicago, Illinois. His father, William Scott, was an immigrant from Scotland who was employed as a commission merchant. His mother, Emily R. Scott, was an immigrant from Canada.

At age 18, Scott "ran away" from Lake Forest College to play baseball at Fort Wayne, Indiana. The next year, he joined a semi-pro team owned by Albert Spalding.

== Career ==
Scott began his major league baseball career on September 30, 1882, appearing in a single game for Cap Anson's Chicago White Stockings. He went two-for-five and scored a run in his only game for the team.

Scott played the 1883 season in the minor leagues with the Fort Wayne Hoosiers of the Northwestern League.

In January 1884, Scott was purchased from Fort Wayne by the Detroit Wolverines of the National League. He returned to the major leagues as the Wolverines' starting first baseman and appeared in 110 games during the 1884 season. He had the best offensive year of his career with a .247 batting average, 17 doubles, five triples, three home runs, and 50 RBIs.

Scott remained with the Wolverines for the first couple months of the 1885 season and hit .264 in 38 games. He was sold to the Pittsburgh Alleghenys in late June and hit .248 in 55 games for that team.

In April 1886, the Alleghenys assigned Scott to the Baltimore Orioles. He was the Orioles' starting first baseman in 1886, appearing in 137 games at the position. However, his batting average dropped to .190, and he appeared in his final major league game on October 14, 1886, at age 25.

Although his major league career ended in 1886, Scott continued to play in the minor leagues through the 1889 season, including stints with the LaCrosse Freezers of the Northwestern League (player-manager, 1887), Kansas City Cowboys of the Western League (1887), Chicago Maroons of the Western Association (1888), and Utica Braves of the New York State League (player-manager, 1889).

== Nickname and later years ==
During his baseball career, Scott was also an expert handball player. He was nicknamed "Mikado Milt". Gilbert and Sullivan's The Mikado, a satirical comic opera set in Japan, opened in March 1885; by February 1886, The Sporting Life reported that "the 'Mikado' craze has invaded base ball, and we hear of amateur 'Mikado' clubs in all directions."

Scott was married in approximately 1886 to Mary (or May) Zell. In 1900, Scott and his wife were living in Chicago. Scott was employed at that time as a police telephone operator. By 1920 and still in 1930, Scott and his wife were living in Baltimore, Maryland. Scott was employed in 1920 as an insurance solicitor and was not employed in 1930.

Scott died in 1938 in Baltimore at age 77. He was buried at Loudon Park Cemetery in Baltimore.
