= Frank Cox (baseball) =

American baseball player (1857–1928)

- Shortstop
- Born: August 29, 1857; Waltham, Massachusetts, US
- Died: June 24, 1928 (aged 70); Hartford, Connecticut, US
- Batted: Unknown Threw: Unknown

MLB debut
- August 13, 1884, for the Detroit Wolverines

Last MLB appearance
- September 29, 1884, for the Detroit Wolverines

MLB statistics
- Batting average: .127
- Home runs: 0
- Runs batted in: 4

Teams
- Detroit Wolverines (1884)

Francis Bernard Cox (August 29, 1857 – June 24, 1928), also known as "Runt", was an American professional baseball player from 1884 to 1891. He played 27 games in Major League Baseball as a shortstop for the Detroit Wolverines in the latter part of the 1884 season.

Born in Waltham, Massachusetts, Cox was the son of Irish immigrants. He began his professional baseball career in 1884 with the Grand Rapids, Michigan team in the Northwestern League. After appearing in 61 games for Grand Rapids, he made his major league debut on August 13, 1884, with the Detroit Wolverines. He appeared in 27 games at the shortstop position for Detroit, while compiling a .127 batting average. His final major league game was on September 29, 1884.

Cox continued to play in the minor leagues for another several years through the 1891 season. His minor league career included stints with teams in New Britain, Connecticut (1885 and 1891), Waterbury, Connecticut (1885), Lawrence, Massachusetts (1886), Bridgeport, Connecticut (1887), Scranton, Pennsylvania (1887), and Utica, New York (1887).

After retiring from baseball, Cox served on the New Britain, Connecticut city planning commission. At the time of the 1910 and 1920 U.S. Censuses, he lived in New Britain with his wife, Elizabeth, and he was employed as a real estate agent and later as a real estate and insurance agent. He died in 1928 at age 70 in Hartford, Connecticut.
