= Walter Prince =

American baseball player (1861–1938)

- First baseman
- Born: May 9, 1861; Amherst, New Hampshire
- Died: March 2, 1938 (aged 76); Bristol, New Hampshire
- Batted: Left Threw: Right

MLB debut
- August 7, 1883, for the Louisville Eclipse

Last MLB appearance
- August 4, 1884, for the Washington Nationals

MLB statistics
- Batting average: .208
- Home runs: 1
- Runs scored: 23

Teams
- Louisville Eclipse (1883); Detroit Wolverines (1884); Washington Nationals (AA) (1884); Washington Nationals (UA) (1884)

Walter Farr Prince (May 9, 1861 – August 4, 1938) was an American professional baseball player from 1883 to 1889. He played two seasons in Major League Baseball, principally as a first baseman, from 1883 to 1884. His longest stint with one team was 43 games with the Washington Nationals (AA) in 1884.

== Early years ==
Prince was born in Amherst, New Hampshire, in 1861.

== Professional baseball player ==
Prince began his professional baseball career with the Woonsocket Comets. In August 1883, he joined the Louisville Eclipse of the American Association to replace the team's injured first baseman Jumbo Latham. Prince appeared in only four games for Louisville, compiling a .182 batting average.

In 1884, Prince played for three different major league clubs—the Detroit Wolverines of the National League (seven games), the Washington Nationals of the American Association (43 games), and the Washington Nationals of the Union Association (one game). In 51 major league games during the 1884 season, he compiled a .209 batting average with three doubles, two triples, one home run and one RBI.

Prince continued to play minor league baseball through the 1889 season, including stints with Haverhill of the Eastern New England League (1885), the Salem Witches of the New England League (1888), Portland of the New England League, and the London Tecumsehs of the International League (1888–89). He compiled a career high .380 batting average with Salem in 1888.

== Later years ==
After retiring from baseball, Prince worked for the International Steam Pump Company for 25 years. In 1910, he was in charge of the company's foundry department at Elizabeth, New Jersey.

Prince later owned a developed a group of overnight bungalows known as Prince's Place on Newfound Lake in Bristol, New Hampshire. He was also an investor in Camp Berea on Newfound Lake in Hebron, New Hampshire.

Prince died of cancer in 1938 at age 76 in Bristol, New Hampshire.
