= Dave Beadle =

American baseball player (1864–1925)

- Catcher / Outfielder
- Born: January 1864; New York, New York, U.S.
- Died: September 22, 1925 (aged 61); New York, New York, U.S.
- Batted: Left Threw: Unknown

MLB debut
- June 17, 1884, for the Detroit Wolverines

Last MLB appearance
- June 17, 1884, for the Detroit Wolverines

MLB statistics
- Batting average: .000
- Home runs: 0
- Runs batted in: 0
- Stats at Baseball Reference

Teams
- Detroit Wolverines (1884)

David A. Beadle (January 1864 – September 22, 1925) was an American professional baseball player who played catcher and outfielder in one game in the Major Leagues for the 1884 Detroit Wolverines. He appeared in his game on June 17, 1884 and failed to get a hit in three at-bats. He played in the minor leagues for the Jersey City Skeeters in 1887 and for three separate Central Interstate League teams in 1888.
