= Frank Jones (baseball) =

American baseball player (1858–1936)

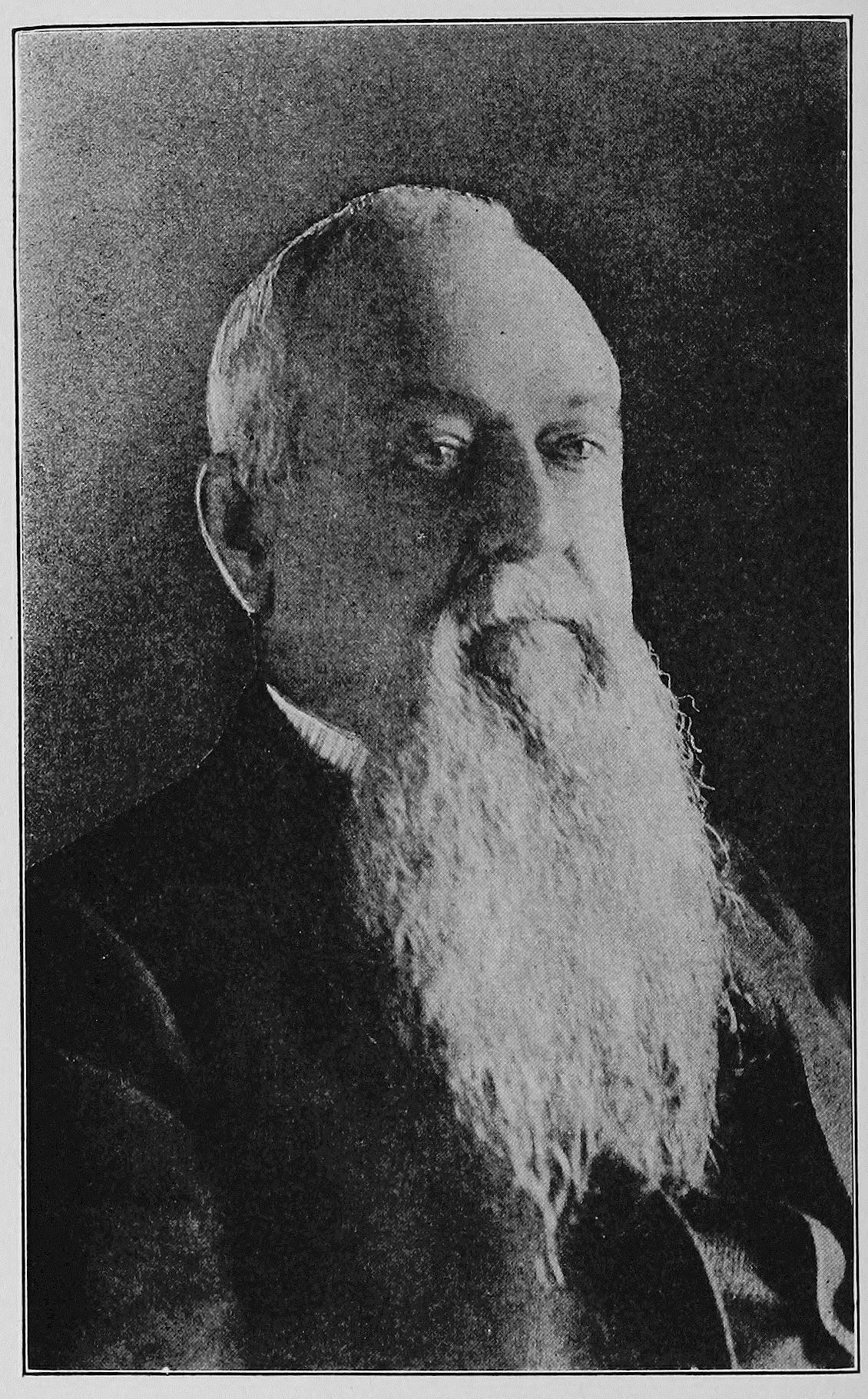
- Shortstop/Outfielder
- Born: August 25, 1858; Princeton, Illinois
- Died: February 4, 1936 (aged 77); Marietta, Ohio
- Batted: Left Threw: Unknown

MLB debut
- July 2, 1884, for the Detroit Wolverines

Last MLB appearance
- July 7, 1884, for the Detroit Wolverines

MLB statistics
- Batting average: .125
- Home runs: 0
- Runs batted in: 0
- Stats at Baseball Reference

Teams
- Detroit Wolverines (1884)

Frank M. Jones (August 25, 1858 – February 4, 1936) was a baseball player who played shortstop and outfielder in the Major Leagues for the 1884 Detroit Wolverines.
