= Ben Guiney =

American baseball player (1858–1930)

- Catcher
- Born: November 16, 1858; Detroit, Michigan, U.S.
- Died: December 5, 1930 (aged 72); Detroit, Michigan, U.S.
- Batted: Both Threw: Right

MLB debut
- September 4, 1883, for the Detroit Wolverines

Last MLB appearance
- June 28, 1884, for the Detroit Wolverines

MLB statistics
- Games played: 3
- At bats: 12
- Hits: 1
- Stats at Baseball Reference

Teams
- Detroit Wolverines (1883–1884)

Benjamin Franklin Guiney (November 16, 1858 – December 5, 1930) was an American professional baseball player, who played in 1883 and 1884 with the Detroit Wolverines, of the National League. He batted right and left and threw right-handed. Guiney had a .083 career batting average, with one career hit in 12 at-bats.

He was born and died in Detroit, Michigan.
