= Edward Santry =

American baseball player (1861–1899)

- Shortstop
- Born: 1861; Chicago, Illinois, US
- Died: March 6, 1899 (aged 37–38); Chicago, Illinois, US
- Batted: Unknown Threw: Unknown

MLB debut
- August 7, 1884, for the Detroit Wolverines

Last MLB appearance
- August 12, 1884, for the Detroit Wolverines

MLB statistics
- Batting average: .182
- Home runs: 0
- Runs batted in: 0
- Stats at Baseball Reference

Teams
- Detroit Wolverines (1884)

Edward Santry (1861 – March 6, 1899) was an American professional baseball player who played in six Major League Baseball games for the Detroit Wolverines in August 1884.

== Early years ==
Santry was born in Chicago, Illinois, in 1861. His father, John Santry, was an immigrant from Ireland who worked in Chicago as a stonemason. His mother, Ellen, was also an Irish immigrant.

== Professional baseball ==
Santry made his debut in Major League Baseball on August 7, 1884, with the Detroit Wolverines. His major league career lasted less than a week, with his last major league game on August 12, 1884. Santry compiled a .182 batting average and scored one run in 22 at bats for the Wolverines.

In 1886, Santry played minor league baseball for Oshkosh in the Northwestern League and the Memphis Grays of the Southern Association. He was also a "player of note in Chicago semi-professional circles."

== Later years ==
Santry died in March 1899 in Chicago.

Santry should not be confused with Eddie Santry, a fellow Chicago native who held the featherweight boxing championship from 1899 to 1900.
