= Tom Kearns (baseball) =

American baseball player (1859–1938)

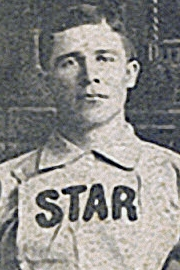
- Second baseman
- Born: November 9, 1859; Rochester, New York, U.S.
- Died: December 7, 1938 (aged 79); Buffalo, New York, U.S.
- Batted: Right Threw: Right

MLB debut
- August 26, 1880, for the Buffalo Bisons]

Last MLB appearance
- October 14, 1884, for the Detroit Wolverines

MLB statistics
- Games played: 27
- Runs scored: 11
- Batting average: .202
- Stats at Baseball Reference

Teams
- Buffalo Bisons (1880); Detroit Wolverines (1882, 1884)

Thomas J. Kearns (November 9, 1859 – December 7, 1938) was an American Major League Baseball player who played catcher in two games for the 1880 Buffalo Bisons and second base in 25 games for the 1882 and 1884 Detroit Wolverines.
