= Joe Weber (baseball) =

Canadian baseball player (1862–1921)

- Outfielder
- Born: February 15, 1862; Hamilton, Canada West
- Died: December 15, 1921 (aged 59); Hamilton, Ontario
- Batted: Right Threw: Unknown

MLB debut
- May 30, 1884, for the Detroit Wolverines

Last MLB appearance
- July 31, 1884, for the Detroit Wolverines

MLB statistics
- Games played: 2
- At bats: 8
- Hits: 0
- Stats at Baseball Reference

Teams
- Detroit Wolverines (1884)

Joseph Edward Weber (February 15, 1862 – December 15, 1921), was a Canadian professional baseball player, who played in 1884 with the Detroit Wolverines, of the National League. In his two-game career, Weber had no hits in eight at-bats.

He was born and died in Hamilton, Ontario.
