= Dick Lowe (baseball) =

American baseball player (1854–1922)

- Catcher
- Born: January 28, 1854; Evansville, Wisconsin
- Died: June 28, 1922 (aged 68); Janesville, Wisconsin
- Batted: Unknown Threw: Unknown

MLB debut
- June 26, 1884, for the Detroit Wolverines

Last MLB appearance
- June 26, 1884, for the Detroit Wolverines

MLB statistics
- Batting average: .333
- Home runs: 0
- Runs batted in: 0
- Stats at Baseball Reference

Teams
- Detroit Wolverines (1884)

Richard Alvern Lowe (January 28, 1854 – June 28, 1922) was a professional baseball player who played catcher in the Major Leagues for the 1884 Detroit Wolverines.
