= Frank Brill =

American baseball player and bowler (1864–1944)

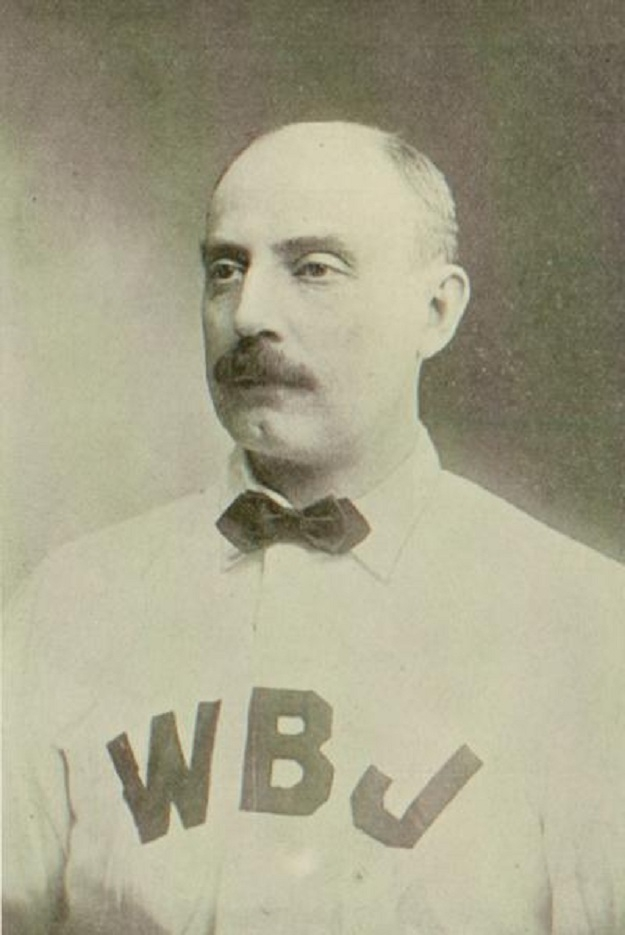
- Pitcher / Outfielder
- Born: March 28, 1864; Astoria, New York, US
- Died: November 19, 1944 (aged 80); Flushing, New York, US
- Batted: Right Threw: Right

MLB debut
- June 23, 1884, for the Detroit Wolverines

Last MLB appearance
- August 8, 1884, for the Detroit Wolverines

MLB statistics
- Win–loss record: 2-10
- Earned run average: 5.50
- Strikeouts: 18
- Stats at Baseball Reference

Teams
- Detroit Wolverines (1884)

Francis Hasbrouck Brill (born Briell) (March 28, 1864 – November 19, 1944) was an American professional baseball player and hall-of-fame bowler. He appeared in one season in Major League Baseball for the Detroit Wolverines during the 1884 season. He played 12 games as a pitcher and one game as an outfielder. He later played several seasons of minor league baseball. During the 1900s he became a prominent ten-pin bowler. At the first annual national championship held by the American Bowling Congress in 1901, Brill won both the singles (648 pins) and all-events (1,736 pins) championships. He was inducted into the American Bowling Congress Hall of Fame in 1996.

== Early years ==
Brill was born in 1864 in Astoria, New York.

== Professional baseball player ==
Brill made his major league debut for the Detroit Wolverines on June 23, 1884, at age 20. Over the next six weeks he appeared in 12 games as a starting pitcher and one game as a left fielder for the Wolverines, compiling a 2–10 win–loss record and a 5.50 earned run average (ERA) as a pitcher and a .136 batting average with six hits and five runs scored in 44 at bats. He appeared in his last major league game on August 8, 1884.

Although his major league playing career ended in 1884, Brill also played five seasons of minor league baseball as a first baseman (55 games), pitcher (26 games), third baseman (24 games) and outfielder (36 games). His minor league career included stints with the Scranton Indians (34 games, 1886), Buffalo Bisons (18 games, 1886), New Haven Blues (31 games, 1887), Wilkes-Barre Coal Barons (1887-1888), Elmira Hottentots (40 games, 1889) and with the Easton, Pennsylvania club (12 games, 1890). While playing for Wilkes-Barre in 1888, he became a first baseman, and The Sporting Life reported that the change in position had revived his career: "As a first baseman Frank Brill has shown himself as among the first in the League; the change from being a pitcher has been beneficial both in his playing and batting."

Brill also played at the shortstop position for the Staten Island Athletic Club baseball team in 1891 and was presented with a gold watch and chain at the end of the season for his contributions to the team.

== Bowling ==
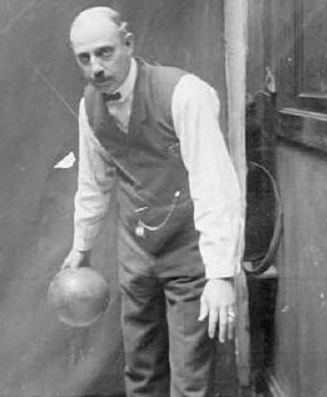
Brill c. 1907

After retiring from baseball, Brill became a professional bowler, competing for the Hoffman Bowling Club of Chicago. In January 1901, he entered the first national bowling championship, participating in singles, doubles and team events. The event was sponsored by the American Bowling Congress and was held on specially built lanes in the Wellsbach building on Wabash Avenue in Chicago. Brill won the 1901 singles championship with a score of 648, and also placed first in all-events with a total pinfall of 1,736 over nine games. Brill was also a member of the Lincoln Groves, the first bowling team to tour the United States.

In 1903 he was working as the manager of a Chicago bowling establishment. He was also reported to have won a prize at an International League tournament. In 1905 he was described as "a bowler of some prominence and an ex-national champion." As of February 1906, The Evening World reported that Brill had competed in all five of the national tournaments held since 1901 and that he had the highest average in those tournaments at 188.21 (45 games).

Brill was inducted into the American Bowling Congress Hall of Fame in 1996.

== Later years ==
Brill lived in Long Island City in 1897. He lived in Chicago for at least 20 years in the early 1900s. At the time of the 1900, 1910 and 1920 U.S. Censuses, he was living in Chicago with his wife, Frances L. Brill. He was employed in 1900 as the manager of a bowling establishment, in 1910 as a saloon keeper and bowling alley employee and in 1920 as a billiard hall manager.

By 1940 Brill had moved to Queens, New York, living with his wife Frances. He died in 1944 in Flushing, New York at age 80. He was buried at the Flushing Cemetery in that city.
