= Frank Meinke =

American baseball player (1863–1931)

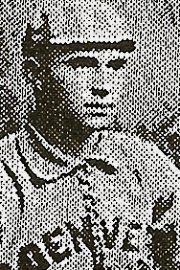
- Shortstop/Pitcher
- Born: October 18, 1863; Chicago, Illinois, US
- Died: November 8, 1931 (aged 68); Chicago, Illinois, US
- Batted: Right Threw: Unknown

MLB debut
- May 1, 1884, for the Detroit Wolverines

Last MLB appearance
- May 22, 1885, for the Detroit Wolverines

MLB statistics
- Batting average: .163
- Home runs: 6
- Runs batted in: 24
- Stats at Baseball Reference

Teams
- Detroit Wolverines (1884–1885)

Frank Louis Meinke (October 18, 1863 – November 8, 1931) was an American professional baseball pitcher from 1883 to 1887. He played two seasons in Major League Baseball for the Detroit Wolverines from 1884 to 1885. In 36 major league games, he compiled an 8-24 record with 124 strikeouts and a 3.18 earned run average (ERA).

== Early years ==
Meinke was born in 1863 in Chicago. His parents Herman and Louise Meinke, were both immigrants from Germany.

== Professional baseball player ==
Meinke began his professional baseball career in 1883 with the Grand Rapids, Michigan club in the Northwestern League.

On May 1, 1884, opening day of the 1884 season, Meinke made his Major League Baseball debut with the Detroit Wolverines of the National League. The Wolverines lost the season opener to Philadelphia by a 13-2 score, began the season with an 11-game losing streak, and finished in eighth place with a 28-84 record. Meinke was the Wolverines' lead pitcher during the 1884 season, appearing in 35 games and pitching 289 innings, including 31 complete games. He compiled a respectable 3.18 earned run average (ERA) but, with little support from his teammates, finished the season with an 8-23 record. Meinke also led the National League's pitchers with a perfect 1.000 fielding percentage.

In addition to pitching, Meinke also served in a utility role and appeared in a total of 92 games during the 1884 season, including 51 games at shortstop, four in the outfield, three at second base, and three at third base. He compiled a .165 batting average in 341 at bats and struck out 89 times, the second highest total in the National League behind Sam Wise.

Meinke returned to the Wolverines in 1885 but appeared in only two games, one as a pitcher and one as an outfielder. Meinke allowed two earned runs in five innings and was the losing pitcher in his only game on the mound. His major league career ended on May 22, 1885.

Meinke continued to play professional baseball in the minor leagues through the 1887 season, including stints with Chattanooga Lookouts of the Southern League (1885), Denver Mountain Lions of the Western League (1886), and LaCrosse Freezers of the Northwestern League (1888).

== Later years ==
Meinke died in November 1931 at age 68. He was buried at Montrose Cemetery.
