= Stump Weidman =

American baseball player (1861–1905)

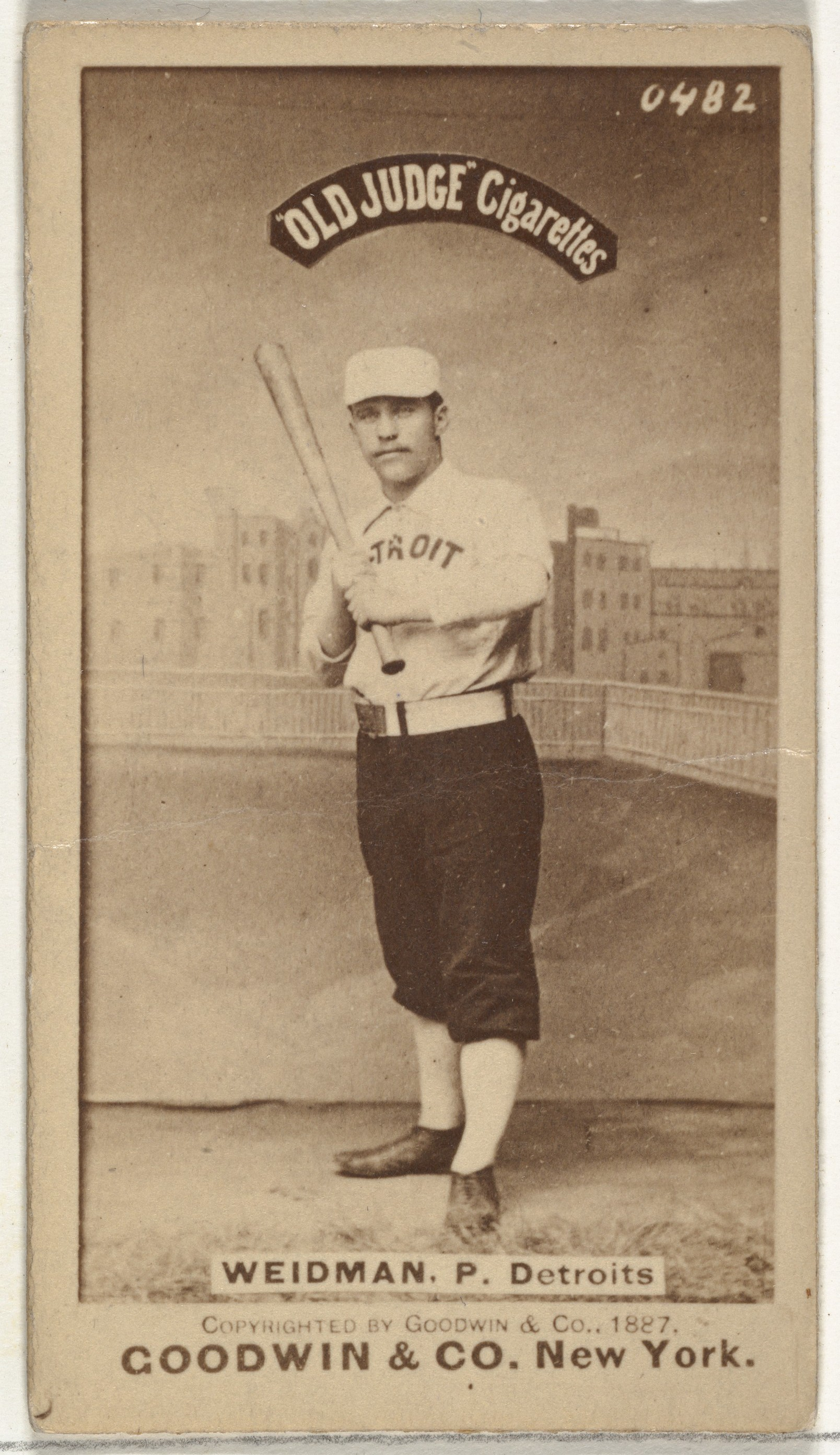
- 1887 baseball card of Weidman
- Pitcher / outfielder
- Born: February 17, 1861; Rochester, New York, U.S.
- Died: March 2, 1905 (aged 44); New York City, U.S.
- Batted: Right Threw: Right

MLB debut
- August 26, 1880, for the Buffalo Bisons

Last MLB appearance
- July 5, 1888, for the New York Giants

MLB statistics
- Win–loss record: 101–156
- Earned run average: 3.61
- Strikeouts: 910
- Stats at Baseball Reference

Teams
- Buffalo Bisons (1880); Detroit Wolverines (1881–1885); Kansas City Cowboys (1886); Detroit Wolverines (1887); New York Metropolitans (1887); New York Giants (1887–1888)

Career highlights and awards
- NL ERA leader (1881)

George Edward "Stump" Weidman (February 17, 1861 – March 2, 1905) was an American professional baseball player from 1880 to 1893. He played nine years in Major League Baseball, principally as a pitcher and outfielder, for five different major league clubs. He appeared in 379 major league games, 279 as a pitcher and 122 as an outfielder, and his longest stretches were with the Detroit Wolverines (288 games, 1881–1885, 1887) and the Kansas City Cowboys (51 games, 1886).

As a pitcher, Weidman compiled a 101–156 (.393) win–loss record with a 3.61 earned run average (ERA) in 2,318 1/3 innings pitched. He led the National League in 1881 with a 1.80 ERA and totaled 45 wins in the 1882 and 1883 seasons. He pitched more innings for the Wolverines (1,654) than any other pitcher in the club's history.

== Early years ==
Weidman was born in Rochester, New York, in 1861. He attended University of Rochester and was a pitcher on the baseball team there in 1880. He also played for the Hop Bitters Club of Rochester, with Buck Ewing as his catcher. Weidman was given his nickname due to his stocky stature, standing 5 ft 7 in (1.70 m) and weighing 165 pounds (75 kg).

== Professional baseball career ==
=== Buffalo ===
Weidman made his major league debut with the Buffalo Bisons on August 26, 1880. In the final weeks of the 1880 season, Weidman started 13 games for the Bisons and appeared in another four games as a relief pitcher. He compiled a 0–9 record and 3.40 earned run average (ERA) in 113 2/3 innings pitched.

=== Washington and Albany ===
Weidman began the 1881 season with the Washington Nationals, then joined the Albany, New York, club in July 1881.

=== Detroit Wolverines ===
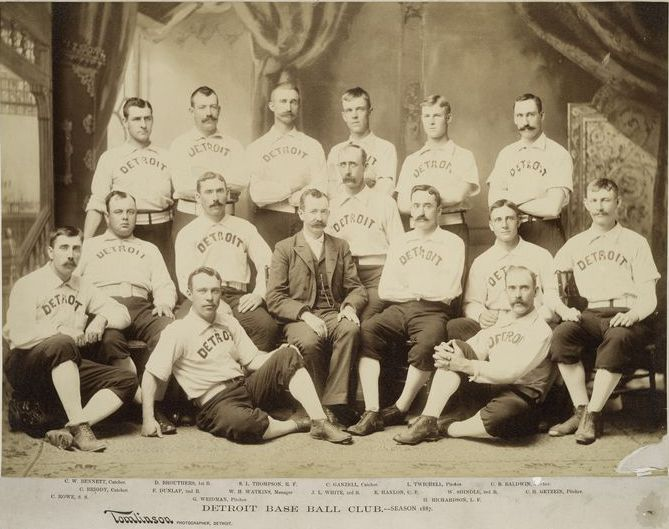
Weidman (seated on ground, center) with the 1887 Detroit Wolverines

After the Albany team folded, Weidman joined the Detroit Wolverines and brought his catcher Sam Trott with him. Weidman and Trott made their debut for Detroit on September 3, 1881, a 4–3 loss against Buffalo. Weidman started 13 games for Detroit in the last month of the season, compiling an 8–5 record and 1.18 ERA in 115 innings pitched. He led the National League in ERA and had the lowest WHIP rating (walks + hits per inning pitched) at 1.043.

Weidman had another strong year in 1882, winning 25 games, pitching 411 innings and 43 complete games with a WHIP rating of 1.046 (4th best in the National League). On August 17, 1882, he was the losing pitcher in one of the great pitching duels in baseball history. Monte Ward was the pitcher for the Providence Grays, and he and Weidman held the game scoreless through 17 innings. Weidman allowed only seven hits but lost the game in the 18th inning on a home run by Old Hoss Radbourn, who was playing in right field.

While he won 25 games in 1882, Weidman also ranked among the league leaders with 20 losses. He lost at least 20 games for five consecutive seasons from 1882 to 1886, ranking among the league leaders in losses for each of those seasons.

Weidman also appeared 88 games as an outfielder for the Wolverines during the 1883 and 1884 seasons. He scored 58 runs, had 50 RBIs, and compiled a .175 batting average during those seasons. Applying the sabermetric Wins Above Replacement (WAR) model, Weidman earned negative ratings of −1.6 and −1.7 in 1883 and 1884.

In 1887, Weidman returned to the Wolverines, where he went 13–7, helping them to the 1887 National League pennant. Over the course of six seasons, Weidman pitched more innings for the Wolverines (1,654) than any other pitcher in the club's history.

=== Kansas City ===
After the 1885 season, Weidman was released by the Wolverines to league control and then obtained by the newly formed Kansas City Cowboys. He appeared in 51 games as a starting pitcher for the Cowboys, including 48 complete games, and also appeared in three games as an outfielder. He compiled a win–loss record of 12–36 (.250) and a −1.4 WAR rating with a 4.52 ERA in 427 2/3 inning pitched. He led the National League in both losses (36) and earned runs allowed (549). His 36 losses in 1886 is tied for ninth highest in major league history. The Kansas City club compiled a 30–91 record and disbanded after the 1886 season.

=== New York ===
In early August 1887, Weidman was sold by Detroit to the New York Metropolitans for a price estimated at between $800 and $1,000. Weidman started 12 games for the Metropolitans in the last half of the 1887 season and compiled a 4–8 record with a 4.64 ERA.

At the end of the 1887 season, the Metropolitans sold Weidman to the New York Giants. Weidman appeared in one game for the Giants in 1887 and two games in 1888. He compiled a 1–2 record and 2.77 ERA in his three games with the Giants. He played in his last major league game with the Giants on July 5, 1888, at age 27.

=== Minor leagues ===
Although his major league career ended in 1888, Weidman continued to pitch in the minor leagues. He compiled a 10–4 record for the Toronto Canucks in 1884. Weidman remained in Canada in 1885, playing for the Hamilton Hams of the International League. He concluded his professional baseball career in 1893 with the Providence Clamdiggers of the Eastern League.

== Later years ==
After retiring from baseball, Weidman worked as an umpire for a time, including one season as an umpire in the National League. He then became a saloon operator in Rochester, New York. His first venture in the saloon business was the firm of Coughlin & Weidman. He later formed a partnership with his brother-in-law, Silk O'Loughlin, a well-known umpire. Weidman and O'Loughlin operated a saloon for several years at 158 State Street in Rochester. That establishment was sold in approximately 1903, after which Weidman and O'Loughlin conducted business at another location.

By early 1905, Weidman developed a tumor which was believed to be throat cancer. He traveled to New York City where he met with medical specialists and underwent an operation that resulted in his death. He died in a New York hospital in March 1905 at age 44. He was buried at Holy Sepulchre Cemetery in Rochester, New York. In an obituary, the Sporting Life wrote: "Weidman was a clean-cut, honest and well behaved ball player, and a credit to his profession at all times. Peace to his ashes."

== See also ==
- List of Major League Baseball annual ERA leaders
- List of Major League Baseball annual saves leaders
- List of Major League Baseball career complete games leaders
