= Fred Wood (baseball) =

Canadian baseball player (1865–1935)

- Catcher/Right fielder
- Born: July 21, 1865; Dundas, Canada West
- Died: November 17, 1935; London, Ontario, Canada
- Batted: Right Threw: Unknown

MLB debut
- May 14, 1884, for the Detroit Wolverines

Last MLB appearance
- September 30, 1885, for the Buffalo Bisons

MLB statistics
- Games played: 13
- Runs scored: 4
- Batting average: .065
- Stats at Baseball Reference

Teams
- Detroit Wolverines (1884); Buffalo Bisons (1885)

Frederick Llewellyn Wood (July 21, 1865 – November 17, 1935) was a Canadian professional baseball player. He played parts of two seasons in Major League Baseball in 1884–85.

Wood played in 12 games for the Detroit Wolverines of the National League in 1884, splitting his fielding time between catcher and right field. In 42 at bats, he gathered just two hits for a .048 batting average, scored four runs, and had three bases on balls. In 1885, he played one game for the Buffalo Bisons, also of the National League, and produced one hit in four at bats.

Wood's brother, Pete Wood, was also a major league player, and his teammate with the Bisons.
