= Recreation Park (Detroit) =

Ballpark in Detroit, Michigan, U.S.

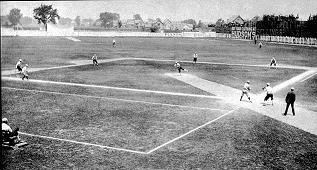
- Game action at Recreation Park
- Interactive map of Recreation Park
- Location: Detroit, Michigan, United States
- Coordinates: 42°21′05″N 83°3′18″W
- Surface: Grass

Construction
- Opened: 1879
- Demolished: 1894

Tenant
- Detroit Wolverines (NL) (1881–1888)

Recreation Park was a ballpark located in Detroit, Michigan. It is best known as the home of the Detroit Wolverines of the National League from 1881 to 1888.

Recreation Park was built in 1879. Its developers intended it to be a multi-use facility. There was a half-mile dirt track running along the outside of the property to be used for horse racing, bicycling, and foot races. The owners also envisioned use for baseball, cricket, archery, croquet, as well as ice skating in the winter.

Detroit fielded a minor league team that summer. Two years later the Wolverines major league team made its debut. The first major league baseball game in Detroit was played here on May 2, 1881.

As the 1880s progressed, the team improved and won the National League pennant in 1887, as well as the World Series, defeating the St. Louis Browns of the American Association. By the end of the next season, the club was losing money in spite of its successes and dropped out of the league. Minor league ball resumed in 1889 and was played for two seasons (plus one game in 1891) before the club folded altogether. Recreation Park continued to be used for various other activities, but by 1894 it was pretty much abandoned, and the structures were demolished.

Locator for the ballpark, 1884

Partial detail of the ballpark, 1889

The Park was on a rectangular site north of the downtown area, less than a mile from the location of the future Comerica Park. The field was laid out so that the foul lines hit the fences at a 135° angle, similar to the Polo Grounds and various other parks of that era. It was bounded on the south by Brady Street, on the east by Beaubien Street, and on the west by Harper Hospital, beyond which lay John R Street. Brush Street made a T-intersection against Brady at the southwest corner of the lot where the main entrance gate was. For that reason, the location is often given as simply "Brady and Brush Streets."

Across the centerfield fence, to the north, was the other half of the Recreation Park complex, a cricket field. Contemporary maps depict an oval track around the cricket field, as with the baseball field, and a larger oval enclosing the entire property. The northern boundary of the property, according to initial contemporary newspaper accounts, was Fremont Street (now Canfield Street). Later accounts placed the northern border at Willis Street, a block south of Fremont / Canfield.

Although the ballpark is long gone, Harper Hospital still exists, housed in new buildings, and overlooking the site where the major league Wolverines once played. An historical marker commemorating Recreation Park is placed in what was once left field, among the buildings of the present Detroit Medical Center.
