= Detroit Wolverines =

19th-century Major League Baseball team

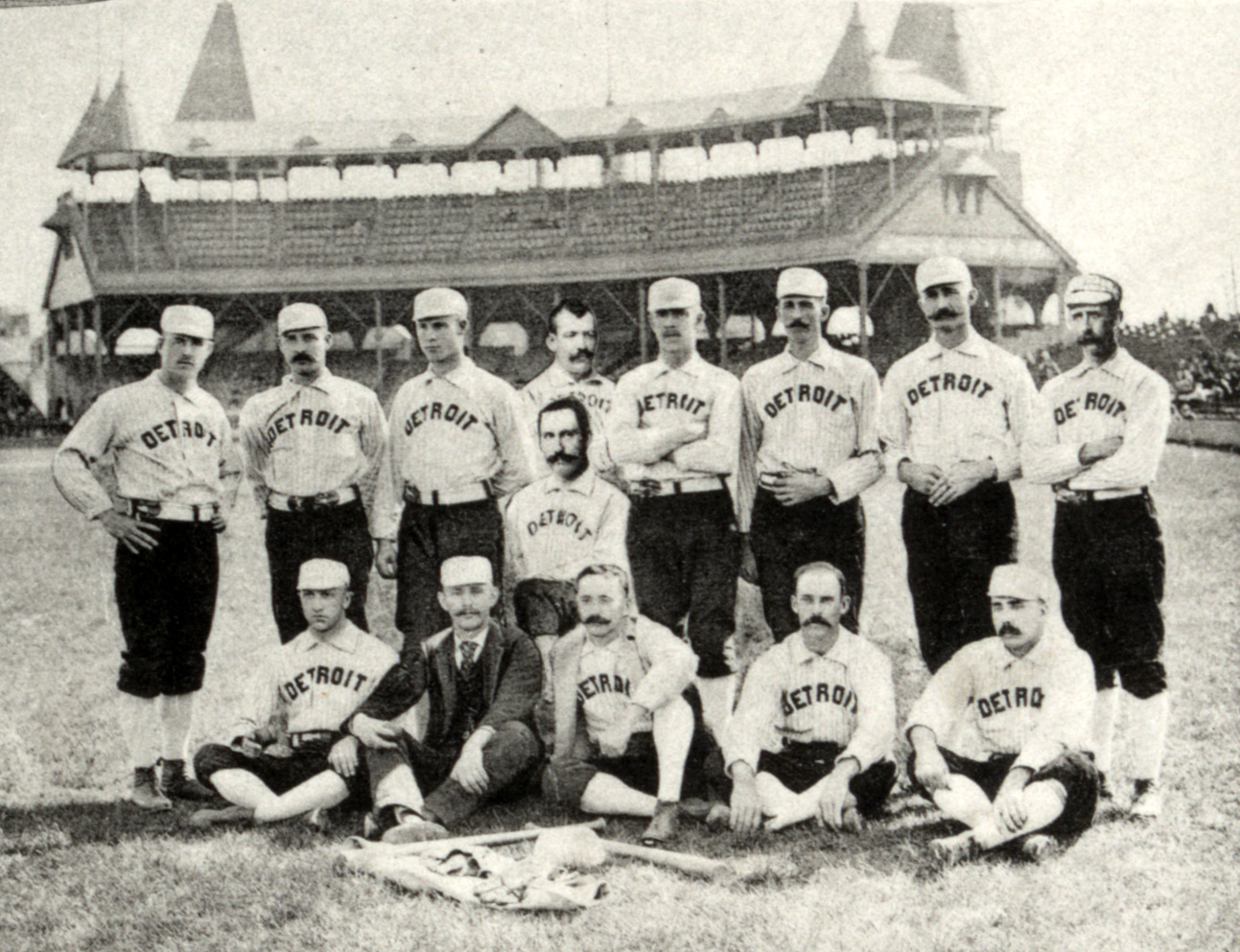
- Logo 1888 Detroit Wolverines, with Boston's South End Grounds as a backdrop

Information
- League: National League (1881–1888)
- Location: Detroit, Michigan
- Ballpark: Recreation Park (1881–1888)
- Founded: 1881
- Folded: 1888
- World's Championship Series championships: 1; 1887
- National League pennants: 1; 1887
- Ownership: List of owners: Frederick K. Stearns (1886–1888); Joseph Marsh (1883–1885); William G. Thompson (1881–1882)
- Manager: List of managers: Robert Leadley (1888); Bill Watkins (1885–1888); Charlie Morton (1885); Jack Chapman (1883–1884); Frank Bancroft (1881–1882)

The Detroit Wolverines were a 19th-century Major League Baseball team that played in the National League from 1881 to 1888 in the city of Detroit, Michigan. In total, they won 426 games and lost 437, taking their lone pennant and winning the pre-modern World Series in 1887. The team was disbanded following the 1888 season.

== Franchise history ==
Founded at the suggestion of Detroit mayor William G. Thompson, the Wolverines played the first game of major league baseball in Detroit on May 2, 1881, in front of 1,286 fans. Their home field was called Recreation Park, and it consisted of a wooden grandstand located between Brady Street and Willis Avenue. This stadium was demolished in 1894, though its location is indicated by a historical marker in what was once left field. The name of the ball club derives from Michigan being known as "The Wolverine State;" although the team name "Wolverines" is now primarily associated with University of Michigan sports, there was no connection between the University and the Detroit baseball team.

Though they folded after only eight seasons, the Wolverines occupy an important place in baseball history. On September 6, 1883, they conceded 18 runs in a single inning against the Chicago White Stockings, the most ever in MLB. In 1885, new owner Frederick Kimball Stearns began spending heavily in an attempt to create a 'super-team' by buying high-priced players. Most notably, he purchased the entire Buffalo Bisons franchise that August, to secure the services of its stars: Dan Brouthers, Jack Rowe, Hardy Richardson, and Deacon White, the so-called "Big Four". This strategy quickly met resistance from his fellow owners, who changed the league's rules governing the splitting of gate receipts, reducing the visiting team's maximum share to $125 per game. Detroit was not yet the Motor City, and its population was too small to support a highly paid team. The Wolverines' home gate receipts were not sufficient to sustain their payroll, and Stearns was forced to sell his stars to other clubs and disband the team after the 1888 season. The franchise's place in the National League was taken by the Cleveland Spiders in 1889.

The Wolverines' most successful season came in 1887, when they were crowned as the champion of the National League with a record of 79 wins and 45 losses. After the season, they defeated the St. Louis Browns, champion of the rival American Association, in a series of exhibition matches, winning ten of the fifteen games played. These games were a predecessor to the modern World Series, which did not begin until 1903.

Three Detroit players hit for the cycle: George Wood on June 13, 1885, Mox McQuery on September 28, 1885, and Jack Rowe on August 21, 1886.

== Prominent players ==
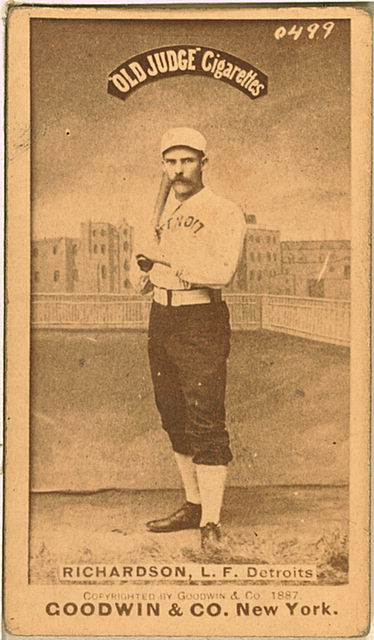
Hardy Richardson of the Detroit Wolverines, circa 1887

- Charlie Bennett
- Dan Brouthers
- Count Campau
- Fred Dunlap
- Ned Hanlon
- Deacon McGuire
- Hardy Richardson
- Jack Rowe
- Billy Shindle
- Sam Thompson
- Deacon White
- Chief Zimmer

=== Baseball Hall of Famers ===
Detroit Wolverines Hall of Famers
Inductee	Position	Seasons	Inducted
Dan Brouthers	1B	1886–1888	1945
Ned Hanlon	CF	1881–1888	1996
Deacon White	3B/C	1886–1888	2013
Sam Thompson	RF	1885–1888	1974

== See also ==
- Detroit Wolverines football team – 1928 NFL franchise
- 1881 Detroit Wolverines season
- 1882 Detroit Wolverines season
- 1883 Detroit Wolverines season
- 1884 Detroit Wolverines season
- 1885 Detroit Wolverines season
- 1886 Detroit Wolverines season
- 1887 Detroit Wolverines season
- 1888 Detroit Wolverines season
- Detroit Wolverines all-time roster
