= 1884 Richmond Virginians season =

1884 Richmond Virginians
- League: American Association
- Ballpark: Allen Pasture
- City: Richmond, Virginia
- Record: 12–30 (.286)
- League place: 10th
- Manager: Felix Moses

The 1884 Richmond Virginians joined the American Association during the season after the Washington Statesmen dropped out. They finished with a 12–30 record, 10th place in the American Association. This was the only season the team was in operation.

== Regular season ==
=== Season standings ===
American Association
Team	W	L	Pct.	GB	Home	Road
New York Metropolitans	75	32	.701	—	42‍–‍9	33‍–‍23
Columbus Buckeyes	69	39	.639	6½	38‍–‍16	31‍–‍23
Louisville Eclipse	68	40	.630	7½	41‍–‍14	27‍–‍26
St. Louis Browns	67	40	.626	8	38‍–‍16	29‍–‍24
Cincinnati Red Stockings	68	41	.624	8	40‍–‍16	28‍–‍25
Baltimore Orioles	63	43	.594	11½	42‍–‍13	21‍–‍30
Philadelphia Athletics	61	46	.570	14	38‍–‍16	23‍–‍30
Toledo Blue Stockings	46	58	.442	27½	28‍–‍25	18‍–‍33
Brooklyn Atlantics	40	64	.385	33½	23‍–‍26	17‍–‍38
Richmond Virginians	12	30	.286	30½	5‍–‍15	7‍–‍15
Pittsburgh Alleghenys	30	78	.278	45½	18‍–‍37	12‍–‍41
Indianapolis Hoosiers	29	78	.271	46	15‍–‍39	14‍–‍39
Washington Nationals	12	51	.190	41	10‍–‍20	2‍–‍31

=== Record vs. opponents ===
1884 American Association record Sources:
Team	BAL	BRO	CIN	COL	IND	LOU	NYM	PHA	PIT	RIC	STL	TOL	WSN
Baltimore	—	5–5	4–6	6–4	9–1	6–4–1	5–5	3–7	9–0	4–0	5–5	5–5–1	2–1
Brooklyn	5–5	—	2–8	3–7	7–3	3–6	1–9–1	3–6	4–6	3–2–1	2–7–1	4–4–2	3–1
Cincinnati	6–4	8–2	—	3–7	9–1–1	5–5	4–6–1	4–6	8–1–1	4–0	4–6	7–3	6–0
Columbus	4–6	7–3	7–3	—	8–2	5–5	4–5	5–5–1	9–1	2–2	5–5	8–1–1	5–1
Indianapolis	1–9	3–7	1–9–1	2–8	—	1–9	2–8	4–6	4–6	1–2–1	3–6–1	3–6	4–2
Louisville	4–6–1	6–3	5–5	5–5	9–1	—	3–7–1	6–3	8–2	4–1	5–5	9–1	4–1
New York	5–5	9–1–1	6–4–1	5–4	8–2	7–3–1	—	8–2	9–1	2–0	5–4–1	5–4–1	6–2
Philadelphia	7–3	6–3	6–4	5–5–1	6–4	3–6	2–8	—	8–2	2–0	3–7	6–3	7–1
Pittsburgh	0–9	6–4	1–8–1	1–9	6–4	2–8	1–9	2–8	—	1–4–1	1–9	5–5	4–1
Richmond	0–4	2–3–1	0–4	2–2	2–1–1	1–4	0–2	0–2	4–1–1	—	1–3	0–4–1	0–0
St. Louis	5–5	7–2–1	6–4	5–5	6–3–1	5–5	4–5–1	7–3	9–1	3–1	—	5–5	5–1
Toledo	5–5–1	4–4–2	3–7	1–8–1	6–3	1–9	4–5–1	3–6	5–5	4–0–1	5–5	—	5–1
Washington	1–2	1–3	0–6	1–5	2–4	1–4	2–6	1–7	1–4	0–0	1–5	1–5	—

=== Roster ===
1884 Richmond Virginians
Roster
Pitchers: Wes Curry; Ed Dugan; John Firth; Pete Meegan	Catchers: Bill Dugan; John Hanna; Bill Morgan; Marshall Quinton; Infielders: Ed Ford; Terry Larkin; Billy Nash; Jim Powell; Bill Schenck; Andy Swan	Outfielders: Ed Glenn; Walt Goldsby; Dick Johnston; Mike Mansell; Wash Williams	Manager: Felix Moses

== Player stats ==
=== Batting ===
==== Starters by position ====
Note: Pos = Position; G = Games played; AB = At bats; H = Hits; Avg. = Batting average; HR = Home runs

Pos	Player	G	AB	H	Avg.	HR
C	John Hanna	22	67	13	.194	0
1B	Jim Powell	41	151	37	.245	0
2B	Terry Larkin	40	139	28	.201	0
SS	Bill Schenck	42	151	31	.205	3
3B	Billy Nash	45	166	33	.199	1
OF	Mike Mansell	29	113	34	.301	0
OF	Ed Glenn	43	175	43	.246	1
OF	Dick Johnston	39	146	41	.281	2

==== Other batters ====
Note: G = Games played; AB = At bats; H = Hits; Avg. = Batting average; HR = Home runs

Player	G	AB	H	Avg.	HR
Marshall Quinton	26	94	22	.234	0
Walt Goldsby	11	40	9	.225	0
Bill Dugan	9	28	3	.107	0
Bill Morgan	6	20	2	.100	0
Andy Swan	3	10	5	.500	0
Wash Williams	2	8	2	.250	0
Ed Ford	2	5	0	.000	0

=== Pitching ===
==== Starting pitchers ====
Note: G = Games pitched; IP = Innings pitched; W = Wins; L = Losses; ERA = Earned run average; SO = Strikeouts

Player	G	IP	W	L	ERA	SO
Pete Meegan	22	179.0	7	12	4.32	106
Ed Dugan	20	166.1	5	14	4.49	60
Wes Curry	2	16.0	0	2	5.06	1
John Firth	1	9.0	0	1	3.00	0
