= Boston Reds (1890–1891) all-time roster =

List of baseball players

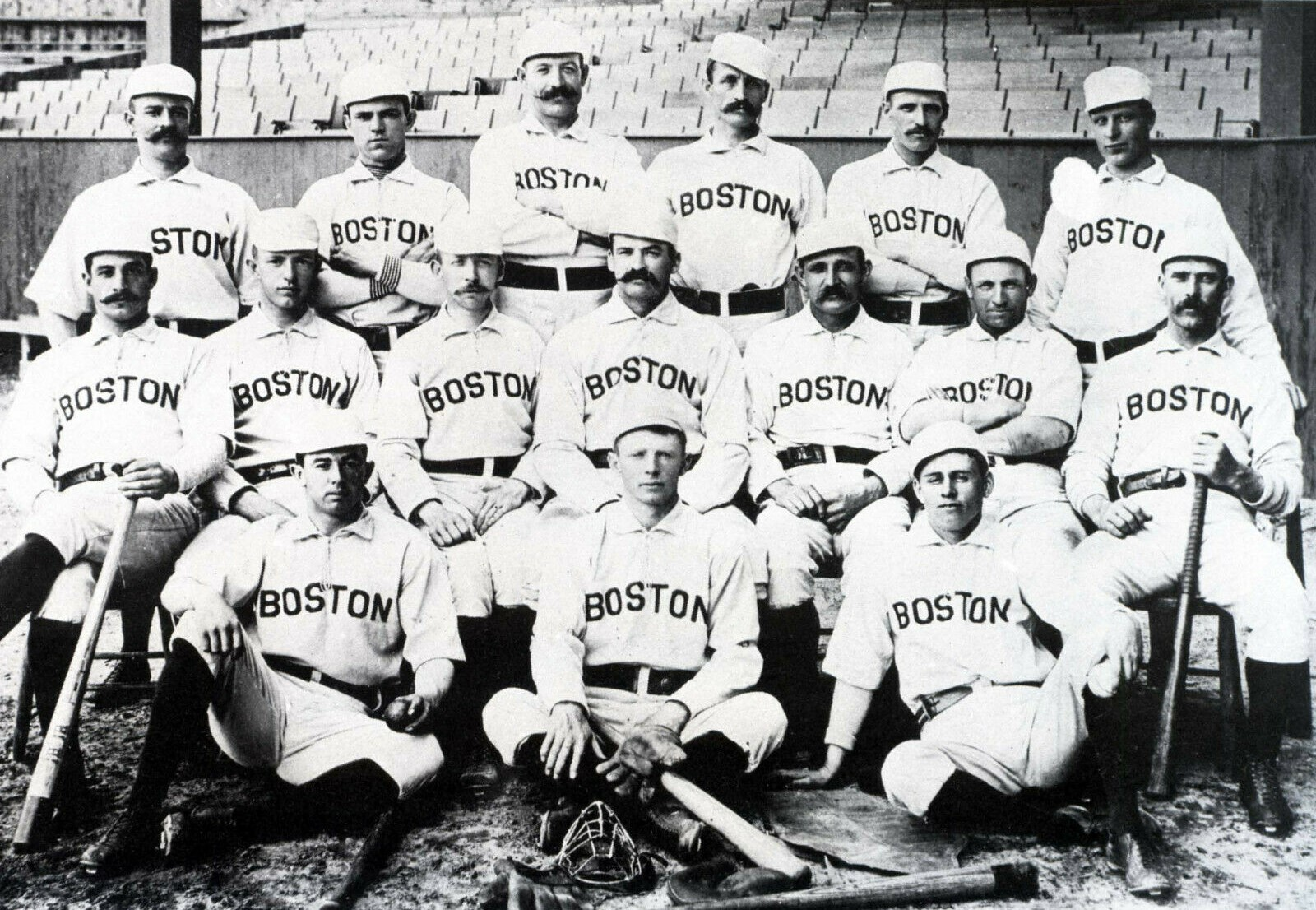
Team photograph of the 1890 Boston Reds

The Boston Reds were a Major League Baseball franchise that played in the Players' League (PL) in 1890, and one season in the American Association (AA) in 1891. In both seasons, the Reds were their league's champion, making them the second team to win back-to-back championships in two different leagues. The first franchise to accomplish this feat was the Brooklyn Bridegrooms, who won the AA championship in 1889 and the National League (NL) championship in 1890. The Reds played their home games at the Congress Street Grounds.

The Reds were an instant success on the field and in the public's opinion. The team signed several top-level players, and they played in a larger, more comfortable and modern ballpark than the Boston Beaneaters, the popular and well established cross-town rival. Player signings that first year included future Hall of Famers King Kelly, Dan Brouthers, and Charles Radbourn, along with other veterans such as Hardy Richardson, Matt Kilroy, Harry Stovey, and Tom Brown. The PL ended after one season, leaving most of its teams without a league.

After the dissolution of the PL, the AA voted to allow the Reds into the new combined league. This was based on the condition that all players be returned to their former clubs via the reserve clause. Although the team's on-field captain, Kelly, became the player-manager for a new AA club, the Cincinnati Kelly's Killers, the Reds stayed intact by keeping several of their top players. Of the club's key players from the previous year's team, Brouthers, Richardson, and Brown were retained. To fill the void of the departing players, the team brought in future Hall of Famers Hugh Duffy and Clark Griffith, along with solid veterans Paul Radford, Charlie Buffinton, and George Haddock. When the 1891 season ended, the AA folded as well, leaving the NL as the sole major league, and the Reds were bought out by the surviving NL clubs.

== Players ==
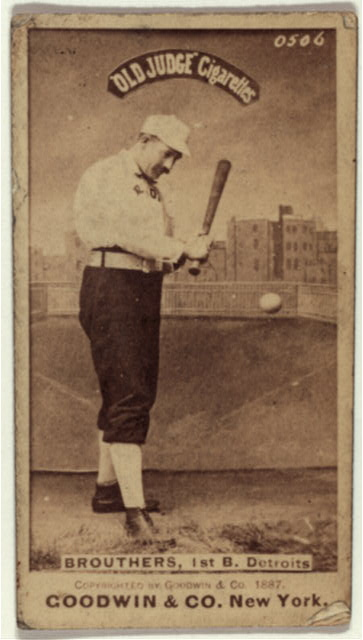
Dan Brouthers, played first base for both championship seasons.

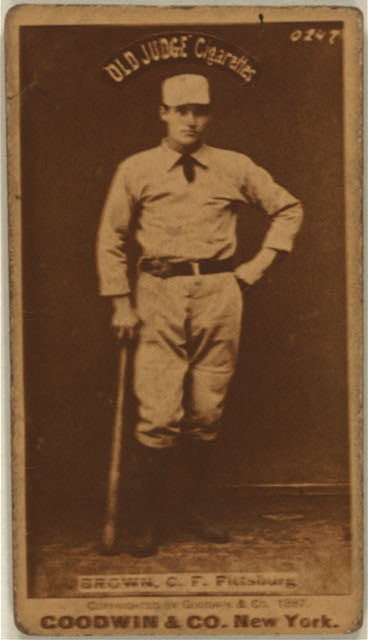
Tom Brown, was the center fielder for both teams. He led the AA in several offensive categories in 1891.

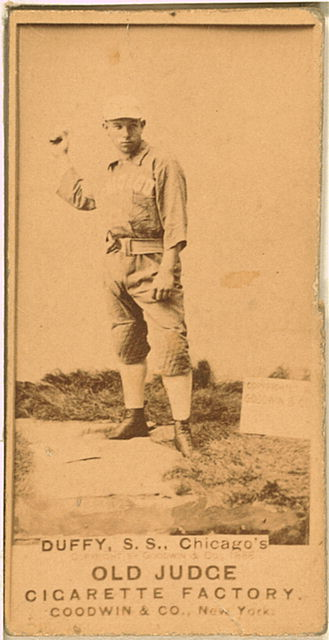
In 1891, Hugh Duffy played RF, and led the league in RBIs.

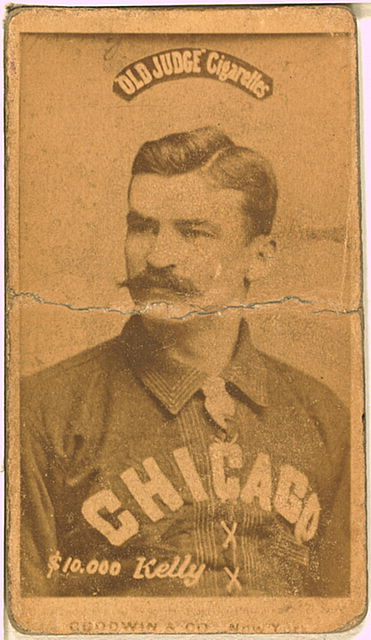
King Kelly, player-manager for the 1890 Boston Reds Players' League champions

Key to symbols in player table
| * | Player was a player-manager |
| † | Inducted into the National Baseball Hall of Fame and Museum |
| § | Indicates the player is a Hall of Famer and was a player-manager |

Players who have played for the Boston Reds, primary position played, and season(s) played for franchise
| Player | Position(s) | Season(s) | Notes | Ref(s) |
|---|---|---|---|---|
| Dan Brouthers^{†} | First baseman | 1890–1891 | In 1891, he led the AA in batting average, on-base percentage, and slugging percentage. | |
| Tom Brown | Center fielder | 1890–1891 | In 1891, he led the AA in at bats, runs scored, hits, triples, and stolen bases. | |
| Charlie Buffinton | Pitcher | 1891 | He won 29 games during his only season with the team. | |
| Tom Cotter | Catcher | 1891 | He played in six games during his only season in the major leagues. | |
| Bill Daley | Pitcher | 1890–1891 | He won 18 games during his one season with the Reds. | |
| Tim Donahue | Catcher | 1891 | He went hitless in seven at bats in 1891. | |
| Tommy Dowd | Right fielder | 1891 | He was loaned to the Washington Senators after playing in four games with the Reds. | |
| Hugh Duffy^{†} | Right fielder | 1891 | In 1891, he tied with teammate Duke Farrell for the AA lead in RBIs. | |
| Duke Farrell | 3B / Catcher | 1891 | In 1891, he led the AA in home runs, and tied for the lead in runs batted in with teammate Hugh Duffy. | |
| John Fitzgerald | Pitcher | 1891 | He played six games during his only season in the major leagues. | |
| Mike Flynn | Catcher | 1891 | He played in one game during his only season in the major leagues. | |
| Clark Griffith^{†} | Pitcher | 1891 | Griffith began his playing career in 1891, and finished the season having played in ten games for the Reds. | |
| Ad Gumbert | Pitcher | 1890 | He won 23 games for the 1890 Reds. | |
| George Haddock | Pitcher | 1891 | In 1891, he led the league in shutouts and won 34 games. | |
| Arthur Irwin^{*} | Shortstop | 1890–1891 | He was a player-manager for the Reds in 1891, and was the brother of John Irwin, who was also his teammate in 1891. | |
| John Irwin | Utility player | 1891 | Irwin played sparingly for both the Reds and the Louisville Colonels in 1891, his last season in the major leagues. | |
| Dick Johnston | Center fielder | 1890 | He played in two games before being sold to the New York Giants, also of the PL. | |
| Bill Joyce | Third baseman | 1890–1891 | In 1890, he was the starting third baseman, and led the PL in bases on balls. | |
| King Kelly^{§} | Catcher / Outfielder | 1890–1891 | Kelly was at the tail end of his Hall of Fame playing career when he became a player-manager of the 1890 Reds, and then later of the Cincinnati Kelly's Killers. | |
| Matt Kilroy | Pitcher | 1890 | He had a pitching record of 9–15 for the Reds in 1890, his last full season in the major leagues. | |
| Kid Madden | Pitcher | 1890–1891 | He played in thirteen games for the 1890 Reds, and one in 1891. | |
| Jack McGeachey | Left fielder | 1890 | He split the 1891 season with the Reds and the Philadelphia Athletics of the AA. | |
| John Morrill | First baseman / Shortstop | 1890 | He played two games in the 1890 Reds' season, the last season of his 15-year career. | |
| Morgan Murphy | Catcher | 1890–1891 | He was the starting catcher during both of the franchise's seasons, which were the first two seasons of his 11-year career. | |
| Billy Nash | Third baseman | 1890 | He was the starting third baseman in 1890. | |
| Cinders O'Brien | Pitcher | 1891 | O'Brien had a pitching record of 18–13 in his final season. It was his last season in the major leagues due to his death during the off-season. | |
| Frank Quinlan | Left fielder / Catcher | 1891 | He played in two games for the Reds in 1891, which was his only season in the major leagues. | |
| Joe Quinn | Second baseman | 1890 | He was the starting second baseman in 1890, and was the first Australian-born person to play in the major leagues. | |
| Charles Radbourn^{†} | Pitcher | 1890 | He had a 27–12 record for the Reds in 1890, the second-to-last season of his career. | |
| Paul Radford | Shortstop | 1891 | He was the starting shortstop in 1891. | |
| Hardy Richardson | Left fielder | 1890–1891 | He started in left field for both teams. In 1890, he led the PL in runs batted in. | |
| Harry Stovey | Right fielder | 1890 | In 1890, he was the starting right fielder and led the PL in stolen bases. | |
| Cub Stricker | Second baseman | 1891 | In 1891, he was the starting second baseman. | |
| Pop Swett | Catcher | 1890 | In 1890, which was his only season in the major leagues, he played in 37 games. | |
