= 1890 Boston Reds season =

1890 Boston Reds
- 1890 Players' League Championship
- League: Players' League
- Ballpark: Congress Street Grounds
- City: Boston, Massachusetts
- Record: 81–74 (.523)
- League place: 1st
- Manager: King Kelly

The 1890 Boston Reds baseball team was a member of the short-lived Players' League. They compiled an 81–47 record and won the league championship. After the season, the league folded, but the Reds were invited to join the American Association for the following season and folded after a single season with players dispersed to other AA teams.

== Regular season ==
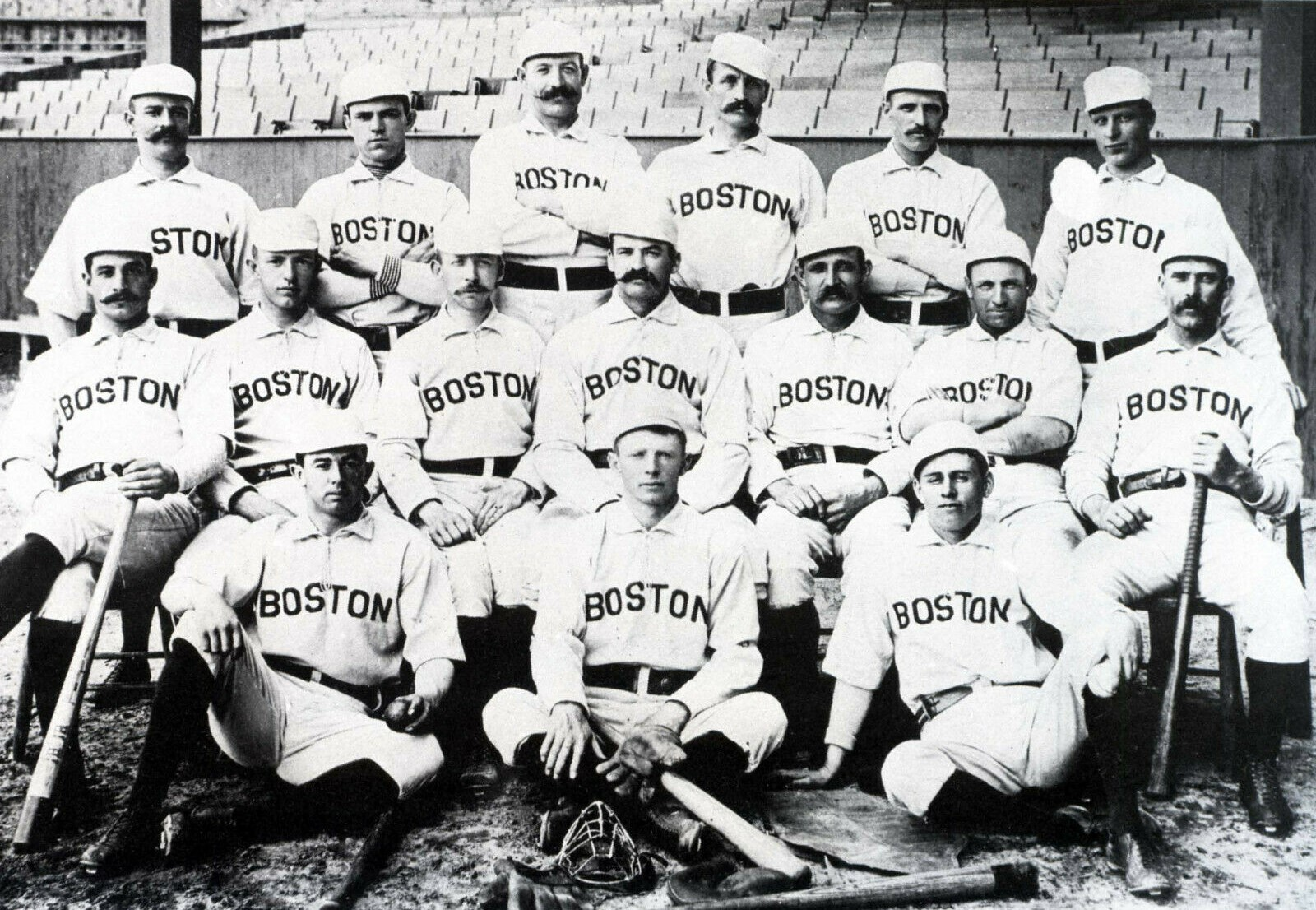
1890 Boston Reds

=== Season standings ===
Players' League
Team	W	L	Pct.	GB	Home	Road
Boston Reds	81	48	.628	—	48‍–‍21	33‍–‍27
Brooklyn Ward's Wonders	76	56	.576	6½	46‍–‍19	30‍–‍37
New York Giants	74	57	.565	8	47‍–‍19	27‍–‍38
Chicago Pirates	75	62	.547	10	46‍–‍23	29‍–‍39
Philadelphia Athletics	68	63	.519	14	35‍–‍30	33‍–‍33
Pittsburgh Burghers	60	68	.469	20½	37‍–‍28	23‍–‍40
Cleveland Infants	55	75	.423	26½	31‍–‍30	24‍–‍45
Buffalo Bisons	36	96	.273	46½	23‍–‍42	13‍–‍54

=== Record vs. opponents ===
1890 Players' League record Sources:
Team	BSR	BKW	BUF	CPI	CLI	NYK	PHQ	PBU
Boston	—	11–7	14–6–1	12–8	12–8	12–8	10–6	10–5
Brooklyn	7–11	—	12–6–1	10–9	12–8	7–10	14–6	14–6
Buffalo	6–14–1	6–12–1	—	5–15	7–9	3–17	4–16	5–13
Chicago	8–12	9–10	15–5	—	13–7	9–9–1	10–10	11–9
Cleveland	8–12	8–12	9–7	7–13	—	8–11	8–11–1	7–9
New York	8–12	10–7	17–3	9–9–1	11–8	—	5–12	14–6
Philadelphia	6–10	6–14	16–4	10–10	11–8–1	12–5	—	7–12
Pittsburgh	5–10	6–14	13–5	9–11	9–7	6–14	12–7	—

=== Roster ===
1890 Boston Reds
Roster
Pitchers: Bill Daley; Ad Gumbert; Matt Kilroy; Kid Madden; Old Hoss Radbourn	Catchers: King Kelly; Morgan Murphy; Pop Swett; Infielders: Dan Brouthers; Arthur Irwin; John Morrill; Billy Nash; Joe Quinn	Outfielders: Tom Brown; Dick Johnston; Hardy Richardson; Harry Stovey	Manager: King Kelly

== Player stats ==
=== Batting ===
==== Starters by position ====
Note: Pos = Position; G = Games played; AB = At bats; H = Hits; Avg. = Batting average; HR = Home runs; RBI = Runs batted in

Pos	Player	G	AB	H	Avg.	HR	RBI
C	Morgan Murphy	68	246	56	.228	2	32
1B	Dan Brouthers	126	475	159	.335	2	102
2B	Joe Quinn	133	523	157	.300	7	86
SS	Arthur Irwin	96	354	92	.260	0	45
3B	Billy Nash	129	488	130	.266	5	90
OF	Harry Stovey	121	496	148	.298	12	88
OF	Tom Brown	131	558	156	.280	4	67
OF	Hardy Richardson	133	570	187	.328	16	152

==== Other batters ====
Note: G = Games played; AB = At bats; H = Hits; Avg. = Batting average; HR = Home runs; RBI = Runs batted in

Player	G	AB	H	Avg.	HR	RBI
King Kelly	89	340	111	.326	4	66
Pop Swett	37	94	18	.191	1	12
Kid Madden	13	38	7	.184	0	4
Gil Hatfield	3	14	2	.143	0	1
Dick Johnston	2	9	1	.111	0	0
John Morrill	2	7	1	.143	0	2

=== Pitching ===
==== Starting pitchers ====
Note: G = Games pitched; IP = Innings pitched; W = Wins; L = Losses; ERA = Earned run average; SO = Strikeouts

Player	G	IP	W	L	ERA	SO
Old Hoss Radbourn	41	343.0	27	12	3.31	80
Ad Gumbert	39	277.1	23	12	3.96	81
Matt Kilroy	30	217.2	9	15	4.26	48

==== Other pitchers ====
Note: G = Games pitched; IP = Innings pitched; W = Wins; L = Losses; ERA = Earned run average; SO = Strikeouts

Player	G	IP	W	L	ERA	SO
Bill Daley	34	235.0	18	7	3.60	110
Kid Madden	10	62.0	3	2	4.79	24

==== Relief pitchers ====
Note: G = Games pitched; W = Wins; L = Losses; SV = Saves; ERA = Earned run average; SO = Strikeouts

Player	G	W	L	SV	ERA	SO
King Kelly	1	1	0	0	4.50	2
Billy Nash	1	0	0	0	0.00	0
