= List of Major League Baseball players (Q) =

The following is a list of Major League Baseball players, retired or active. As of the end of the 2011 season, there have been 45 players with a last name that begins with Q who have been on a major league roster at some point.

== Q ==
Name	Debut	Final game	Position	Teams	Ref
Chad Qualls	July 22, 2004		Pitcher	Houston Astros, Arizona Diamondbacks, Tampa Bay Rays, San Diego Padres	
Jim Qualls	May 10, 1969	May 28, 1972	Outfielder	Chicago Cubs, Montreal Expos, Chicago White Sox	
Tom Qualters	September 13, 1953	September 25, 1958	Pitcher	Philadelphia Phillies, Chicago White Sox	
Paul Quantrill	July 20, 1992	September 27, 2005	Pitcher	Boston Red Sox, Philadelphia Phillies, Toronto Blue Jays, Los Angeles Dodgers, New York Yankees, San Diego Padres, Florida Marlins	
Bill Quarles	May 21, 1891	September 9, 1893	Pitcher	Washington Statesmen, Boston Beaneaters	
Billy Queen	April 13, 1954	April 25, 1954	Outfielder	Milwaukee Braves	
Mel Queen (P)	April 18, 1942	May 1, 1952	Pitcher	New York Yankees, Pittsburgh Pirates	
Mel Queen (P/OF)	April 13, 1964	July 21, 1972	Pitcher	Cincinnati Reds, California Angels	
George Quellich	August 1, 1931	August 16, 1931	Outfielder	Detroit Tigers	
Carlos Quentin	July 20, 2006		Outfielder	Arizona Diamondbacks, Chicago White Sox	
Joe Quest	August 30, 1871	July 12, 1886	Second baseman	Cleveland Forest Citys, Indianapolis Blues, Chicago White Stockings, Detroit Wolverines, St. Louis Browns, Pittsburgh Alleghenys, Philadelphia Athletics (AA)	
Rubén Quevedo	April 14, 2000	September 28, 2003	Pitcher	Chicago Cubs, Milwaukee Brewers	
Eddie Quick	September 28, 1903	September 28, 1903	Pitcher	New York Highlanders	
Hal Quick	September 7, 1939	September 28, 1939	Shortstop	Washington Senators	
Frank Quilici	July 18, 1965	September 29, 1970	Utility infielder	Minnesota Twins	
Lee Quillen	September 30, 1906	August 14, 1907	Third baseman	Chicago White Sox	
Quinlan, first name unknown	September 7, 1874	September 7, 1874	Shortstop	Philadelphia White Stockings	
Finners Quinlan	September 6, 1913	July 15, 1915	Outfielder	St. Louis Cardinals, Chicago White Sox	
Frank Quinlan	October 5, 1891	October 5, 1891	Utility player	Boston Reds (AA)	
Robb Quinlan	July 28, 2003	June 25, 2010	Utility infielder	Anaheim Angels/Los Angeles Angels of Anaheim	
Tom Quinlan	September 4, 1990	April 6, 1996	Third baseman	Toronto Blue Jays, Philadelphia Phillies, Minnesota Twins	
Quinn, first name unknown	September 9, 1875	September 17, 1875	Outfielder	Brooklyn Atlantics	
Frank Quinn (OF)	August 9, 1899	October 2, 1899	Outfielder	Chicago Orphans	
Frank Quinn (P)	May 29, 1949	April 26, 1950	Pitcher	Boston Red Sox	
Jack Quinn	April 15, 1909	July 7, 1933	Pitcher	New York Highlanders, Boston Braves, Baltimore Terrapins, Chicago White Sox, New York Yankees, Boston Red Sox, Philadelphia Athletics, Brooklyn Robins/Dodgers, Cincinnati Reds	
Joe Quinn (C)	September 7, 1881	September 27, 1881	Catcher	Boston Red Caps, Worcester Ruby Legs	
Joe Quinn (2B)	April 26, 1884	July 23, 1901	Second baseman	St. Louis Maroons, Boston Beaneaters, Boston Reds (PL), St. Louis Browns (NL), Baltimore Orioles (19th century), Cleveland Spiders, Cincinnati Reds, St. Louis Cardinals, Washington Senators	
John Quinn	October 9, 1911	October 9, 1911	Catcher	Philadelphia Phillies	
Mark Quinn	September 14, 1999	June 7, 2002	Outfielder	Kansas City Royals	
Paddy Quinn	July 26, 1871	June 21, 1877	Catcher	Fort Wayne Kekiongas, Keokuk Westerns, Hartford Dark Blues, Chicago White Stockings	
Tad Quinn	September 27, 1902	May 14, 1903	Pitcher	Philadelphia Athletics	
Tom Quinn	September 2, 1886	October 4, 1890	Catcher	Pittsburgh Alleghenys, Baltimore Orioles (19th century), Pittsburgh Burghers	
Wimpy Quinn	June 8, 1941	September 25, 1941	Pitcher	Chicago Cubs	
Luis Quiñones	May 27, 1983	April 11, 1992	Utility infielder	Oakland Athletics, San Francisco Giants, Chicago Cubs, Cincinnati Reds, Minnesota Twins	
Rey Quiñones	May 17, 1986	July 21, 1989	Shortstop	Boston Red Sox, Seattle Mariners, Pittsburgh Pirates	
Carlos Quintana	September 16, 1988	October 3, 1993	First baseman	Boston Red Sox	
Luis Quintana	July 9, 1974	June 28, 1975	Pitcher	California Angels	
Omar Quintanilla	July 31, 2005		Utility infielder	Colorado Rockies, Texas Rangers, New York Mets, Baltimore Orioles	
Humberto Quintero	September 3, 2003		Catcher	San Diego Padres, Houston Astros	
Marshall Quinton	August 7, 1884	June 25, 1885	Catcher	Richmond Virginians, Philadelphia Athletics (AA)	
Rafael Quirico	June 25, 1996	June 25, 1996	Pitcher	Philadelphia Phillies	
Art Quirk	April 17, 1962	May 22, 1963	Pitcher	Baltimore Orioles, Washington Senators (1961–1971)	
Jamie Quirk	September 4, 1975	October 4, 1992	Catcher	Kansas City Royals, Milwaukee Brewers, St. Louis Cardinals, Chicago White Sox, Cleveland Indians, New York Yankees, Oakland Athletics, Baltimore Orioles	
Guillermo Quiróz	September 4, 2004		Catcher	Toronto Blue Jays, Seattle Mariners, Texas Rangers, Baltimore Orioles	
Dan Quisenberry	July 8, 1979	April 23, 1990	Pitcher	Kansas City Royals, St. Louis Cardinals, San Francisco Giants	
