= Forepaugh Park =

Ballpark in Philadelphia, Pennsylvania

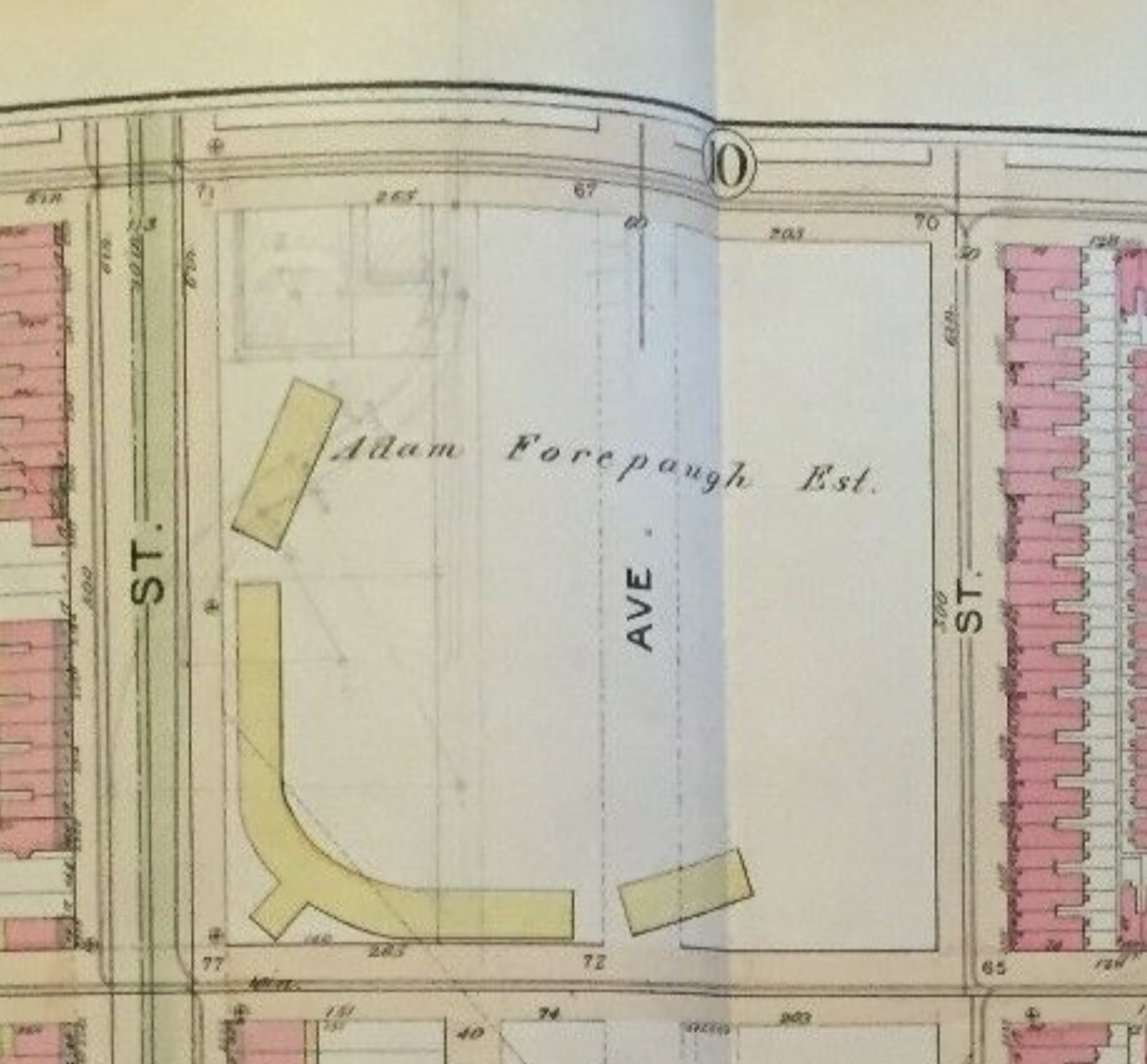
- Forepaugh Park, bounded by N Broad St (West), W Dauphin St (South), N 13th St (East), W York St (North); Philadelphia, Pennsylvania; GW Bromley Atlas (1894)
- Interactive map of Forepaugh Park
- Former names: Brotherhood Park (1890); Athletic Base Ball Grounds (1891)
- Location: Broad St/Dauphin St; Philadelphia, Pennsylvania
- Coordinates: 39°59′19″N 75°9′16″W
- Owner: Adam Forepaugh (until 1890); estate of Adam Forepaugh (1890–1894)
- Operator: J. Earl Wagner (1890-1891)
- Capacity: 5,000
- Surface: Grass
- Field size: Left Field – 345 ft Center Field – 450 ft, 420 ft (1891); Right Field – 380 ft
- Public transit: Passenger Railways: Tenth & Eleventh; Twelfth & Sixteenth; Thirteenth & Fifteenth; Seventeenth & Nineteenth; Fourth & Eighth; Eighteenth & Twentieth; Union Line: Broad Street; Pennsylvania Rail Road: Sixteenth Street Station; Reading Rail Road: Sixteenth Street Station

Construction
- Renovated: 1890
- Closed: 1893
- Demolished: 1894

Tenants
- Philadelphia Athletics (PL) (1890); Philadelphia Athletics (AA) (1891)

Forepaugh Park was a baseball ground located in Philadelphia, Pennsylvania, at Broad and Dauphin Streets in North Philadelphia. It had an estimated capacity of 5,000. The ground was home to the Philadelphia Quakers of the Players' League in 1890 and the American Association in 1891. The ballpark featured a bicycle track and was a popular velodrome in Philadelphia in the early 1890s. The ballpark was owned by and named for Adam Forepaugh and the grounds used for circuses and various types of exhibitions until 1894. The property was sold for development and residences constructed in 1895.

== History ==
In April 1886, Forepaugh and P. T. Barnum joined to present a circus at Forepaugh Park that featured 50 marching elephants, 1,000 horses, a Wild West show, and the skeleton of Jumbo the elephant who had died the previous year.

Contemporary maps locate the ballpark on the block bounded by North Broad Street (west, third base); Dauphin Street (south, first base); North 13th Street (east, right field); and York Street (north, left field); and with the north-south streets Pembroke (now Watts) Street and Park Avenue penciled in to cut through the ballpark, which they were in 1894 after the block was sold to developers. This placed the ballpark just two blocks, corner-to-corner, from the National League Park.

The ballpark was accessible by six streetcar lines and two blocks from the Reading Railroad's Huntington Street Station. The Players League Athletics signed a lease in December 1889 to pay $5,000 rent for the 1890 season.

Prior to the 1890 season, a new grandstand pavilion was erected for the 1890 Players League season and painted in bright colors. During the summer, a new cinder bicycle track was laid down which attracted amateur competitions.

During the 1890 season, the ballpark was concurrently dubbed "Brotherhood Park", a common practice for the ballfields used by the Players' League clubs. The largest crowd was 17,812 on April 30, 1890 when the Athletics hosted the Boston Reds.

Philadelphia's Players League club at Forepaugh Park outdrew the American Association Philadelphia Athletics at the Jefferson Street Grounds in 1890. The American Association Athletics had lost their best players to the Players League club which led to the club's financial ruin and expulsion from the American Association after the 1890 season. With the concurrent folding of the Players League, the American Association granted the Philadelphia franchise to Players League Athletics owner J. Earl Wagner. The Athletics played their 1891 home games at Forepaugh Park.

Forepaugh Park in 1890

Adam Forepaugh had died in January 1890. The filing of the account of his assets in Orphans Court in April 1891 appraised the value of Forepaugh Park at $400,000.

On August 1, 1891, Forepaugh Park and its bicycle track hosted the Philadelphia Cycle Dealers' Road Race and Race Meeting which included twelve individual events.

In October 1891, Barnum and Bailey erected their tents at the ballpark grounds. Their tents had seating for 16,000 and they presented the show, "Rome Under Nero." After the baseball season, it was reported that Athletics J. Earl Wagner had earned $5,000 in profits from baseball, in addition to the rents charged to the Forepaugh and Barnum circuses.

Forepark Park often featured soccer. The All Philadelphias faced the Cosmopolitans of New York on March 24, 1894 for the inter city championship. 2,000 fans saw the All Philadelphia win 4 to 0 including Phillies ownership and manager Arthur Irwin who would organize the American League of Professional Football later that year.

Philadelphia's Ancient Order of Hibernians held its community games at Forepaugh Park on Memorial Day 1894.

In the summer of 1894, the outdoor spectacle, "The Destruction of Herculaneum" was presented on a specially constructed stage with a grand ballet troupe, artificial lake, and pyrotechnics.
