= 1890 Philadelphia Athletics (PL) season =

1890 Philadelphia Athletics
- League: Players' League
- Ballpark: Forepaugh Park
- City: Philadelphia, Pennsylvania
- Record: 68–63 (.519)
- League place: 5th
- Owner: J. Earl Wagner
- Managers: Jim Fogarty, Charlie Buffinton

The 1890 Philadelphia Athletics (alternately known as the Quakers) baseball team was a member of the short lived Players' League. The team compiled a 68–63 record and finished in fifth place in the league.

After the season ended, the league folded, and the Athletics were admitted into the American Association as a replacement for the AA version of the Philadelphia Athletics, a team that was expelled after the 1890 season.

== Spring training ==
The team traveled south for spring training in March 1890, and trained in Gainesville, Florida at The Ballpark.

== Regular season ==
=== Season standings ===
Players' League
Team	W	L	Pct.	GB	Home	Road
Boston Reds	81	48	.628	—	48‍–‍21	33‍–‍27
Brooklyn Ward's Wonders	76	56	.576	6½	46‍–‍19	30‍–‍37
New York Giants	74	57	.565	8	47‍–‍19	27‍–‍38
Chicago Pirates	75	62	.547	10	46‍–‍23	29‍–‍39
Philadelphia Athletics	68	63	.519	14	35‍–‍30	33‍–‍33
Pittsburgh Burghers	60	68	.469	20½	37‍–‍28	23‍–‍40
Cleveland Infants	55	75	.423	26½	31‍–‍30	24‍–‍45
Buffalo Bisons	36	96	.273	46½	23‍–‍42	13‍–‍54

=== Record vs. opponents ===
1890 Players' League record Sources:
Team	BSR	BKW	BUF	CPI	CLI	NYK	PHQ	PBU
Boston	—	11–7	14–6–1	12–8	12–8	12–8	10–6	10–5
Brooklyn	7–11	—	12–6–1	10–9	12–8	7–10	14–6	14–6
Buffalo	6–14–1	6–12–1	—	5–15	7–9	3–17	4–16	5–13
Chicago	8–12	9–10	15–5	—	13–7	9–9–1	10–10	11–9
Cleveland	8–12	8–12	9–7	7–13	—	8–11	8–11–1	7–9
New York	8–12	10–7	17–3	9–9–1	11–8	—	5–12	14–6
Philadelphia	6–10	6–14	16–4	10–10	11–8–1	12–5	—	7–12
Pittsburgh	5–10	6–14	13–5	9–11	9–7	6–14	12–7	—

=== Roster ===
1890 Philadelphia Athletics
Roster
Pitchers: Charlie Buffinton; Bert Cunningham; Bill Husted; Phil Knell; Ben Sanders	Catchers: Lave Cross; Jocko Milligan; Infielders: Sid Farrar; Joe Mulvey; John Pickett; Dan Shannon; Billy Shindle	Outfielders: Jim Fogarty; Mike Griffin; Bill Hallman; George Wood	Manager: Charlie Buffinton; Jim Fogarty

== Player stats ==
=== Batting ===
==== Starters by position ====
Note: Pos = Position; G = Games played; AB = At bats; H = Hits; Avg. = Batting average; HR = Home runs; RBI = Runs batted in

Pos	Player	G	AB	H	Avg.	HR	RBI
C	Jocko Milligan	62	234	69	.295	3	57
1B	Sid Farrar	127	481	123	.256	1	69
2B	John Pickett	100	407	114	.280	4	64
SS	Billy Shindle	132	584	189	.324	10	90
3B	Joe Mulvey	120	519	149	.287	5	87
OF	Mike Griffin	115	489	140	.286	6	54
OF	Jim Fogarty	91	347	83	.239	4	58
OF	George Wood	132	539	156	.289	9	102

==== Other batters ====
Note: G = Games played; AB = At bats; H = Hits; Avg. = Batting average; HR = Home runs; RBI = Runs batted in

Player	G	AB	H	Avg.	HR	RBI
Bill Hallman	84	356	95	.267	1	37
Lave Cross	63	245	73	.298	3	47
Dan Shannon	19	75	18	.240	1	16

=== Pitching ===
==== Starting pitchers ====
Note: G = Games pitched; IP = Innings pitched; W = Wins; L = Losses; ERA = Earned run average; SO = Strikeouts

Player	G	IP	W	L	ERA	SO
Ben Sanders	43	346.2	19	18	3.76	107
Phil Knell	35	286.2	22	11	3.83	99
Charlie Buffinton	36	283.1	19	15	3.81	89
Bill Husted	18	129.0	5	10	4.88	33
Bert Cunningham	14	108.2	3	9	5.22	33
