= Bill Husted =

American baseball player (1866–1941)

- Pitcher
- Born: October 11, 1866; Gloucester City, New Jersey
- Died: May 17, 1941 (aged 74); Gloucester City, New Jersey
- Batted: Unknown Threw: Unknown

MLB debut
- April 29, 1890, for the Philadelphia Athletics

Last MLB appearance
- October 4, 1890, for the Philadelphia Athletics

MLB statistics
- Win–loss record: 5-10
- Earned run average: 4.88
- Strikeouts: 33
- Stats at Baseball Reference

Teams
- Philadelphia Athletics (1890)

William J. Husted (October 11, 1866 – May 17, 1941) was a pitcher in Major League Baseball who played for the Philadelphia Athletics of the Players' League during the 1890 season. He was born in Gloucester City, New Jersey.

In one season career, Husted posted a 5–10 record with a 4.88 earned run average in 18 appearances, including 12 complete games, giving up 105 runs (70 earned) on 148 hits and 67 walks while striking out 33 in 129.0 innings of work.

Husted died in his native Gloucester at the age of 74.

== See also ==
- 1890 Philadelphia Athletics (PL) season
