= Tom Brown (outfielder) =

American baseball player (1860–1927)

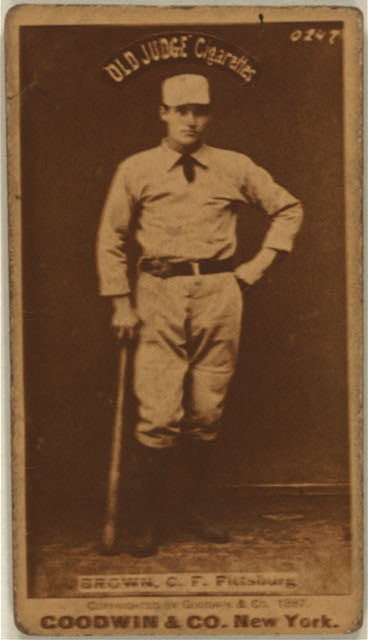
- Tom Brown in his Pittsburgh Alleghenys uniform
- Center fielder
- Born: September 21, 1860; Liverpool, England
- Died: October 25, 1927 (aged 67); Washington, D.C., U.S.
- Batted: Left Threw: Right

MLB debut
- July 6, 1882, for the Baltimore Orioles

Last MLB appearance
- May 17, 1898, for the Washington Senators

MLB statistics
- Batting average: .265
- Hits: 1,958
- Home runs: 64
- Runs batted in: 742
- Stolen bases: 657
- Stats at Baseball Reference

Teams
- As player: Baltimore Orioles (1882); Columbus Buckeyes (1883–1884); Pittsburgh Alleghenys (1885–1887); Indianapolis Hoosiers (1887); Boston Beaneaters (1888–1889); Boston Reds (1890–1891); Louisville Colonels (1892–1894); St. Louis Browns (1895); Washington Senators (1895–1898); As manager: Washington Senators (1897–1898)

Career highlights and awards
- NL stolen base leader (1893)

Thomas Tarlton Brown (September 21, 1860 – October 25, 1927) was an American professional baseball center fielder. Born in Liverpool, Lancashire, England, son of William Henry Tarlton Brown and Mary Nixon Lewis, he played for 17 seasons, a career in which he batted .265 while scoring 1,524 runs with 1,958 hits. Upon his retirement he served as an umpire, working mostly in the National League in 1898 and 1901–1902.

== Career ==
In June 1882, Tom signed with the Baltimore Orioles, of the American Association, as a non-drafted free agent. As a right fielder, he hit one home run with 23 runs batted in for that season with Baltimore. He was a right fielder for most of his early career, switching over to center later in his career. That year, the Orioles finished 6th in the league, and Brown was sent to the Columbus Buckeyes in an unknown transaction before the 1883 season. He played two seasons in Columbus, both of which he hit five home runs and drove in 32 runs. His best season with them occurred in 1884, when he batted .273 and scored 93 runs in 106 games played.

On October 30, 1884, the Buckeyes went under and the team, with all of its players, were purchased by the Pittsburgh Alleghenys for a sum of $8,000. Highlights of his two and a half seasons with the Alleghenys include a .307 batting average in 1885 and 51 RBIs in 1886. However, he struggled in 1887 and was released by Pittsburgh on August 15. He was picked up by the Indianapolis Hoosiers, of the National League, a few days later, where he hit only .179 in 36 games. While at Indianapolis, Brown became part of the first known platoon arrangement in baseball, as he split time with right-handed hitting Gid Gardner.

Before the 1888 season, he was sent to the Boston Beaneaters. Brown was one of Boston's star players. As their starting right fielder he hit nine home runs with 49 RBIs, and stole 46 bases. After the 1888 season, Albert Spalding assembled two teams of players for a baseball world tour with Tom pitching for the "All America" team. The tour lasted until March 1889. For the 1889 season, he only hit two home runs, and drove in 24 runs, but placed third in the league with 63 stolen bases. He also scored 93 runs while only accumulating 84 hits.

Brown jumped to the new Players' League, along with many other major league players, before the 1890 season. The league lasted just one season, and Tom signed with the Boston Reds. In that season with the Reds, he hit .274 with 4 home runs and 61 RBIs, and stole 79 bases. When the league folded after the season, the Reds continued on in the American Association in 1891, where Brown had his greatest season, when he led the league in at bats, triples with 21, runs scored with 177, stolen bases with 106, base hits with 189. Behind Brown's hitting prowess, and with other star such as Dan Brouthers, Hugh Duffy, and Charlie Buffinton, the Reds finished first in the league.

After the 1891 season, the Association folded, Brown was granted to the league and was later obtained by the Louisville Colonels on January 1, 1892. He played in Louisville for three seasons, during which he stole a league-leading 66 bases in 1893, hit 9 home runs in 1894, and scored over 100 runs in each of his three seasons. On January 6, 1895, he was traded to the St. Louis Browns for shortstop Frank Shugart. Brown played in 83 games for St. Louis before being released in August. He signed with the Washington Senators on August 21, 1895. Brown later served as the player-manager of the Senators for the 1897 and 1898 seasons, winning 64 games and losing 72.

== Career records ==
Brown established the major league record with 490 errors committed as an outfielder. He racked up 222 errors in the American Association, 238 in the National League, and 30 in the Player's League. By contrast, the National League record is held by nineteenth-century player George Gore with 346 errors and the American League record by Ty Cobb with 271.

== Other baseball capacities ==
After his retirement early in the 1898 season, he became an umpire and finished the season in the National League, umpiring a total of 96 games that year. During his time umpiring, he ejected seven players from games, three of which were in 1898. On September 30, Philadelphia Phillies second baseman Nap Lajoie was sent to the bench after a heated argument, insisting Brown is crooked. Nap was suspended for three days. The following season, in 1899 he only umpired two games before becoming manager of the minor league Springfield Ponies in the Eastern League. He returned to umpiring for the 1901 and 1902 seasons when he called 65 and 143 games respectively. He again left the profession until he returned for 12 more games in 1907 in the American League.

== Post baseball career ==
Tom was predeceased by his wife, Christine, and his daughter, Ethel May Brown Stratton. In later life he owned a tobacco store on M Street in Washington, DC. Tom died in Washington, D.C. at the age of 67, and is interred at the Fort Lincoln Cemetery in Brentwood, Maryland.

== See also ==
- List of Major League Baseball career triples leaders
- List of Major League Baseball career runs scored leaders
- List of Major League Baseball career stolen bases leaders
- List of Major League Baseball annual stolen base leaders
- List of Major League Baseball annual runs scored leaders
- List of Major League Baseball annual triples leaders
- List of Major League Baseball player-managers
