= Andrew Swann =

Andrew Swann may refer to:

- Andrew Swann (footballer) (1878–?), Scottish footballer
- S. Andrew Swann, American science fiction and fantasy author
- Andrew Swann, game developer for Twilight

== See also ==
- Andrew Swan (born 1968), politician in Manitoba, Canada
- Andy Swan (baseball) (1858–?), baseball first baseman
