= Ed Glenn =

Ed Glenn may refer to:

- Ed Glenn (shortstop) (1875–1911), professional baseball shortstop
- Ed Glenn (outfielder) (1860–1892), professional baseball outfielder

== See also ==
- Edward Glen (born 1953), Canadian voice actor
