= Pop Swett =

American baseball player (1870–1934)

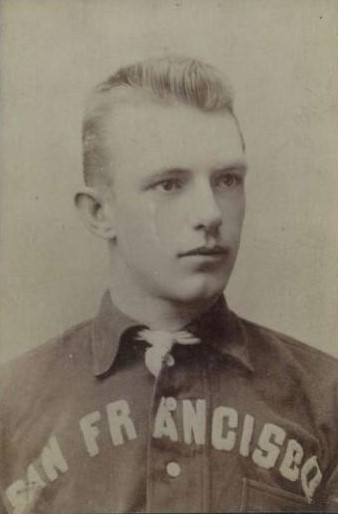
- Catcher
- Born: April 16, 1870; San Francisco, California, U.S.
- Died: November 22, 1934 (aged 64); San Francisco, California, U.S.
- Batted: Unknown Threw: Unknown

MLB debut
- May 3, 1890, for the Boston Reds

Last MLB appearance
- October 4, 1890, for the Boston Reds

MLB statistics
- Batting average: .191
- Home runs: 1
- Runs batted in: 12
- Stats at Baseball Reference

Teams
- Boston Reds (1890)

William Edward "Pop" Swett (April 16, 1870 – November 22, 1934) was an American catcher and right-fielder in Major League Baseball in 1890.

== Career ==
Swett was born in San Francisco, California. He debuted as a professional baseball catcher in May 3,1890 with the San Francisco Haverlys of the California League. Swett played there for a couple of seasons and then ventured east in 1890 to join the Boston Reds of the Players' League. As the second youngest player in the league, he was the team's backup catcher to Morgan Murphy. Swett batted .191 in 37 games. The Reds won the pennant. However, the Players' League folded after the season, and Swett returned to the west coast.

Swett played baseball in California for the next few seasons. While with Stockton in 1893, he played so well The Sporting Life wrote that he was "without doubt one of the best catchers on the coast." Even though Swett was only 23 years old, the newspaper referred to him as "Pop Swett."

Swett played professional baseball as late as 1896. He died in San Francisco at the age of 64.
