= 1890 New York Giants (PL) season =

1890 New York Giants
- League: Players' League
- Ballpark: Polo Grounds
- City: New York City
- Record: 74–57 (.565)
- League place: 3rd
- Manager: Buck Ewing

The 1890 New York Giants baseball team was a member of the short lived Players' League. They compiled a 74–57 record, good for third place, eight games behind the league champion Boston Reds. After the season, the league folded, and the Giants were bought out by their National League New York Giants. The Giants were the original tenants of the Polo Grounds stadium that afterwards was occupied by the National League's New York Giants for 66 years.

== Regular season ==
=== Season standings ===
Players' League
Team	W	L	Pct.	GB	Home	Road
Boston Reds	81	48	.628	—	48‍–‍21	33‍–‍27
Brooklyn Ward's Wonders	76	56	.576	6½	46‍–‍19	30‍–‍37
New York Giants	74	57	.565	8	47‍–‍19	27‍–‍38
Chicago Pirates	75	62	.547	10	46‍–‍23	29‍–‍39
Philadelphia Athletics	68	63	.519	14	35‍–‍30	33‍–‍33
Pittsburgh Burghers	60	68	.469	20½	37‍–‍28	23‍–‍40
Cleveland Infants	55	75	.423	26½	31‍–‍30	24‍–‍45
Buffalo Bisons	36	96	.273	46½	23‍–‍42	13‍–‍54

=== Record vs. opponents ===
1890 Players' League record Sources:
Team	BSR	BKW	BUF	CPI	CLI	NYK	PHQ	PBU
Boston	—	11–7	14–6–1	12–8	12–8	12–8	10–6	10–5
Brooklyn	7–11	—	12–6–1	10–9	12–8	7–10	14–6	14–6
Buffalo	6–14–1	6–12–1	—	5–15	7–9	3–17	4–16	5–13
Chicago	8–12	9–10	15–5	—	13–7	9–9–1	10–10	11–9
Cleveland	8–12	8–12	9–7	7–13	—	8–11	8–11–1	7–9
New York	8–12	10–7	17–3	9–9–1	11–8	—	5–12	14–6
Philadelphia	6–10	6–14	16–4	10–10	11–8–1	12–5	—	7–12
Pittsburgh	5–10	6–14	13–5	9–11	9–7	6–14	12–7	—

=== Roster ===
1890 New York Giants
Roster
Pitchers: Ed Crane; John Ewing; Tim Keefe; Hank O'Day	Catchers: William Brown; Buck Ewing; Farmer Vaughn; Infielders: Roger Connor; Fred Dunlap; Gil Hatfield; Danny Richardson; Dan Shannon; Art Whitney	Outfielders: George Gore; Dick Johnston; Jim O'Rourke; Mike Slattery	Manager: Buck Ewing

== Player stats ==
=== Batting ===
==== Starters by position ====
Note: Pos = Position; G = Games played; AB = At bats; H = Hits; Avg. = Batting average; HR = Home runs; RBI = Runs batted in

Pos	Player	G	AB	H	Avg.	HR	RBI
C	Buck Ewing	83	352	119	.338	8	72
1B	Roger Connor	123	484	169	.349	14	103
2B	Dan Shannon	83	324	70	.216	3	44
SS	Danny Richardson	123	528	135	.256	4	80
3B	Art Whitney	119	442	97	.219	0	45
OF	George Gore	93	399	127	.318	10	55
OF	Jim O'Rourke	111	478	172	.360	9	115
OF	Mike Slattery	97	411	126	.307	5	67

==== Other batters ====
Note: G = Games played; AB = At bats; H = Hits; Avg. = Batting average; HR = Home runs; RBI = Runs batted in

Player	G	AB	H	Avg.	HR	RBI
Dick Johnston	77	306	74	.242	1	43
Gil Hatfield	71	287	80	.279	2	37
William Brown	60	230	64	.278	4	43
Farmer Vaughn	44	166	44	.265	1	22
Fred Dunlap	1	4	2	.500	0	0

=== Pitching ===
==== Starting pitchers ====
Note: G = Games pitched; IP = Innings pitched; W = Wins; L = Losses; ERA = Earned run average; SO = Strikeouts

Player	G	IP	W	L	ERA	SO
Ed Crane	43	330.1	16	19	4.63	116
Hank O'Day	43	329.0	22	13	4.21	94
John Ewing	35	267.1	18	12	4.24	145
Tim Keefe	30	229.0	17	11	3.38	89
Buck Ewing	1	9.0	0	1	4.00	2

==== Relief pitchers ====
Note: G = Games pitched; W = Wins; L = Losses; SV = Saves; ERA = Earned run average; SO = Strikeouts

Player	G	W	L	SV	ERA	SO
Gil Hatfield	3	1	1	1	3.52	3
