= John Hanna (baseball) =

American baseball player (1863–1930)

- Catcher
- Born: November 3, 1863; Philadelphia, Pennsylvania, U.S.
- Died: November 7, 1930 (aged 67); Philadelphia, Pennsylvania, U.S.
- Batted: Unknown Threw: Unknown

MLB debut
- May 23, 1884, for the Washington Nationals

Last MLB appearance
- October 15, 1884, for the Richmond Virginians

MLB statistics
- Batting average: .126
- Home runs: 0
- Runs batted in: 0
- Stats at Baseball Reference

Teams
- Washington Nationals (1884); Richmond Virginians (1884)

John Hanna (November 3, 1863 in Philadelphia, Pennsylvania – November 7, 1930 in Philadelphia, Pennsylvania) was a 19th-century American professional baseball catcher.
