= Bill Morgan (outfielder/catcher) =

American baseball player (1857–1938)

- Outfielder/Catcher
- Born: October 17, 1857; Brooklyn, New York
- Died: July 28, 1938; Baltimore, Maryland
- Batted: Unknown Threw: Unknown

MLB debut
- 1884, for the Richmond Virginians

Last MLB appearance
- August 21, 1884, for the Baltimore Monumentals

MLB statistics
- Batting average: .221
- Hits: 21
- Runs scored: 95
- Stats at Baseball Reference

Teams
- Richmond Virginians (1884); Baltimore Monumentals (1884)

Henry William Morgan (October 17, 1857 - July 28, 1938) was a professional baseball player in the Major Leagues. He was a catcher and outfielder for the 1884 Richmond Virginians and Baltimore Monumentals.
