= Bill Daley (baseball) =

American baseball player (1868–1922)

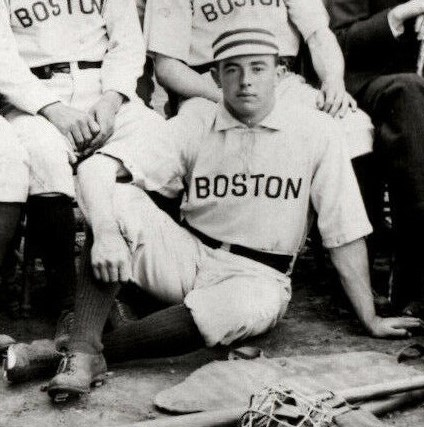
- Daley in 1889
- Pitcher
- Born: June 27, 1868; Poughkeepsie, New York, U.S.
- Died: May 4, 1922 (aged 53); Poughkeepsie, New York, U.S.
- Batted: Unknown Threw: Left

MLB debut
- July 17, 1889, for the Boston Beaneaters

Last MLB appearance
- June 30, 1891, for the Boston Reds

MLB statistics
- Win–loss record: 29–16
- Earned run average: 3.37
- Strikeouts: 223
- Stats at Baseball Reference

Teams
- Boston Beaneaters (1889); Boston Reds (1890–1891)

William Daley (June 27, 1868 – May 4, 1922) was an American Major League Baseball pitcher from 1889 to 1891. He played for the Boston Beaneaters and Boston Reds.

Daley started his professional baseball career with the Jersey City Skeeters in 1887. In 1890 – his only full season in the majors – he led the Players' League in winning percentage with a record of 18–7.

== See also ==
- List of Major League Baseball annual saves leaders
