= Bill Schenck =

American baseball player (1854–1934)

- Third baseman/Shortstop
- Born: July 1854; Brooklyn, New York, U.S.
- Died: January 29, 1934 (aged 79); Brooklyn, New York, U.S.
- Batted: Unknown Threw: Unknown

MLB debut
- May 29, 1882, for the Louisville Eclipse

Last MLB appearance
- September 7, 1885, for the Brooklyn Grays

MLB statistics
- Batting average: .236
- Home runs: 3
- Runs batted in: 0
- Stats at Baseball Reference

Teams
- Louisville Eclipse (1882); Richmond Virginians (1884); Brooklyn Grays (1885)

William G. Schenck (July 1854 – January 29, 1934) was a 19th-century American Major League Baseball player. He played in 1882 and 1884–1885 for the Louisville Eclipse, Richmond Virginians and Brooklyn Grays of the American Association. The positions he played were Shortstop and Third Baseman.
