= Andy Swan (baseball) =

American baseball player

- First baseman
- Born: August 1858; Falls, Pennsylvania, U.S.
- Died: November 13, 1907 (aged 49); Dallas, Texas, U.S.
- Batted: Unknown Threw: Unknown

MLB debut
- July 23, 1884, for the Washington Nationals

Last MLB appearance
- October 13, 1884, for the Richmond Virginians

MLB statistics
- Batting average: .258
- Home runs: 0
- Runs batted in: 0
- Stats at Baseball Reference

Teams
- Washington Nationals (1884); Richmond Virginians (1884)

Andrew J. Swan (1858 – November 13, 1907) was an American professional baseball first baseman. He played in the American Association for the Washington Nationals and the Richmond Virginians. He hit .258 in 31 at-bats.
