= John Firth (baseball) =

American baseball player (1855–1902)

- Pitcher
- Born: May 6, 1855; Lowell, Massachusetts, U.S.
- Died: June 23, 1902 (aged 47); Tewksbury, Massachusetts, U.S.
- Batted: Unknown Threw: Unknown

MLB debut
- August 15, 1884, for the Richmond Virginians

Last MLB appearance
- August 15, 1884, for the Richmond Virginians

MLB statistics
- Win–loss record: 0-1
- earned run average: 8.00
- Strikeouts: 0
- Stats at Baseball Reference

Teams
- Richmond Virginians (1884)

John E. Firth (May 6, 1855 – June 23, 1902) was an American professional baseball pitcher in the American Association for the 1884 Richmond Virginians.
