= Congress Street Grounds =

Baseball ground in Boston, Massachusetts, US

- Brotherhood Grounds
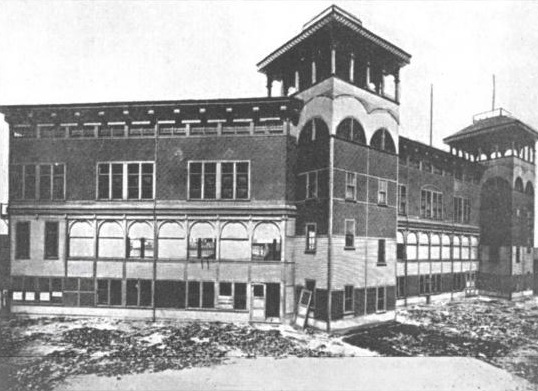
- Congress Street Grounds' pavilion nearing completion, 1890. Only known photo of the exterior of the ballpark.
- Interactive map of Congress Street Grounds
- Location: Boston, Massachusetts
- Coordinates: 42°21′5″N 71°2′49″W
- Owner: Boston Wharf Company
- Capacity: 14,000
- Surface: Grass
- Field size: Left Field – 250 feet (76 m)

Construction
- Groundbreaking: 1890
- Opened: 1890
- Closed: 1896
- Demolished: 1896

Tenants
- Boston Reds (PL / AA) (1890–1891); Boston Reds (NEL) (1893); Boston Beaneaters (NL) (1894)

Newspaper sketch of interior, 1890

Congress Street Grounds is a former baseball ground located in Boston, Massachusetts. The ballpark, as the name implies, was along Congress Street, near the intersection of Thompson Place, and not far from the Fort Point Channel on South Boston Flats, a newly filled in piece of land on Boston Harbor. The ground was home to the Boston Reds, that played in the Players' League in 1890 and the American Association in 1891.

Although a short-lived facility, the ballpark witnessed some significant history. First, its occupants won league pennants in their two years of existence. Despite its success, the club was dropped during the NL-AA merger of 1892, as there was already an NL entry in Boston.

Then, between May and June 1894, Congress Street Grounds was the home to the Boston Beaneaters while their home grounds, the South End Grounds, were being rebuilt after the Great Roxbury Fire of May 15, 1894. It had a close left field fence, which benefited Boston's Bobby Lowe just a couple of weeks later, on May 30, 1894, as he became the first batter to hit four home runs in a single game, all of them down the line in left field.

In parts of the years between 1892 and autumn of 1896, the field was used for various local sports, including Gaelic football, hurling, and track-and-field events. By the end of 1896, the ballpark had been dismantled and urban development took over the property.

The location is now occupied by several office buildings, and the alley behind them, which would go through the area of the outfield, was used in the 2006 film The Departed, in a key scene where Martin Sheen's character is pushed off a roof.

Historic New England has a photo of the interior of the park.

- Historic New England

== Gallery ==
Congress Street Grounds plan, 1889

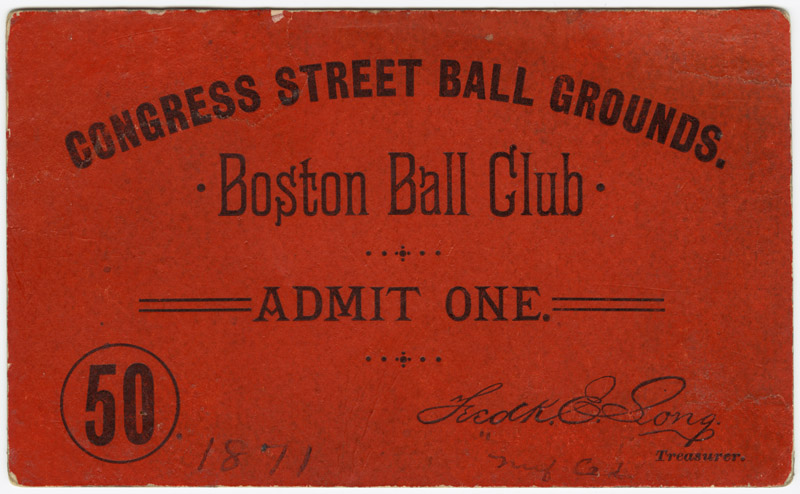
Congress Street Grounds pass, 1891
