= Wash Williams =

American baseball player

- Outfielder
- Born: Unknown; Philadelphia, Pennsylvania, U.S.
- Died: Unknown
- Batted: Unknown Threw: Unknown

MLB debut
- August 5, 1884, for the Richmond Virginians

Last MLB appearance
- June 8, 1885, for the Chicago White Stockings

MLB statistics
- Batting average: .250
- Home runs: 0
- Runs batted in: 0
- Stats at Baseball Reference

Teams
- Richmond Virginians (1884); Chicago White Stockings (1885)

Washington J. Williams was an American professional baseball outfielder in the American Association for the Richmond Virginians and in the National League for the 1885 Chicago White Stockings.
