= Ed Glenn (outfielder) =

American baseball player (1860–1892)

- Outfielder
- Born: September 19, 1860; Richmond, Virginia, U.S.
- Died: February 10, 1892 (aged 31); Richmond, Virginia, U.S.
- Batted: Right Threw: Right

MLB debut
- August 5, 1884, for the Richmond Virginians

Last MLB appearance
- October 5, 1888, for the Boston Beaneaters

MLB statistics
- Batting average: .202
- Home runs: 1
- Runs batted in: 29
- Stats at Baseball Reference

Teams
- Richmond Virginians (1884); Pittsburgh Alleghenys (1886); Kansas City Cowboys (1888); Boston Beaneaters (1888)

Edward C. "Eddie" Glenn (born Edward C. Glinn - September 19, 1860 in Richmond, Virginia – February 10, 1892 in Richmond, Virginia) was an American professional baseball outfielder. He played all or part of three seasons in the major leagues between 1884 and 1888, mostly in the American Association.

Glenn, a 5' 10", 160-pound right-handed outfielder, had 555 plate appearances in 137 major league games. He hit .202 with 20 extra-base hits and 29 RBI, but was more widely respected for his dextrous outfield play, smart base running, and steady clubhouse presence. Among his teammates in Richmond and Boston was star third-baseman Billy Nash, another native Richmonder.

Glenn also played for five minor league teams between 1884 and 1890, including the Richmond Virginias/Virginians of the Eastern League; the Syracuse Stars of the International League; the Charleston Quakers and Charleston Seagulls of the Southern League; and the Sioux City Corn Huskers of the Western Association. As a minor-leaguer, he hit .304, with 15 home runs. He also pitched seven innings for Charleston in 1887, giving up eight runs (five earned) on 16 hits. Injuries, and lack of success against major-league pitching, derailed his career in 1890.

He began playing in 1879 and eventually signed with the Richmond Virginias, an independent professional club, which became a member of the new minor Eastern League in 1884 (and which, also known as the Richmond Virginians, briefly became a major-league American Association team in August of that year after the demise of the A. A.'s Washington franchise). The Virginias/Virginians returned to a re-formed minor-league Eastern League in 1885.

His grave is in Richmond's Shockoe Hill Cemetery. His marker gives his actual name, Edward C. Glinn.
