= Ed Ford (baseball) =

American baseball player (1862–1931)

- First baseman/Shortstop
- Born: April 10, 1862; Richmond, Virginia
- Died: June 8, 1931 (aged 69); Richmond, Virginia
- Batted: Unknown Threw: Unknown

MLB debut
- October 9, 1884, for the Richmond Virginians

Last MLB appearance
- October 10, 1884, for the Richmond Virginians

MLB statistics
- Batting average: .000
- Home runs: 0
- Runs batted in: 0
- Stats at Baseball Reference

Teams
- Richmond Virginians (1884)

Edgar Lee Ford (April 10, 1862 – June 8, 1931) was a professional baseball first baseman and shortstop. He played in the American Association for the Richmond Virginians. He later managed in the minor leagues in 1912 and 1914.
