= Pete Meegan =

American baseball player (1862–1905)

- Pitcher
- Born: November 13, 1862; San Francisco, California, U.S.
- Died: March 14, 1905 (aged 42); San Francisco, California, U.S.
- Batted: Left Threw: Unknown

MLB debut
- August 12, 1884, for the Richmond Virginians

Last MLB appearance
- October 1, 1885, for the Pittsburgh Alleghenys

MLB statistics
- Win–loss record: 14–20
- earned run average: 3.90
- Strikeouts: 164
- Stats at Baseball Reference

Teams
- Richmond Virginians (1884); Pittsburgh Alleghenys (1885)

Peter James Meegan (November 13, 1862 – March 14, 1905), also known as "Steady" Pete, was an American Major League Baseball player who pitched for two seasons; one with the 1884 Richmond Virginians, and the other for the 1885 Pittsburgh Alleghenys, both of the American Association.

== Early life and career ==
Meegan was born on November 13, 1862, in San Francisco, California, to Lawrence and Ann Meegan who were Irish refugees from the Great Famine, who had moved from Boston to San Francisco prior to the American Civil War with Ann’s sister Bridget and her husband John Brady—the great-great-grandparents of NFL quarterback Tom Brady— who lived as their next door neighbors in the Mission District.

Meegan made his major league debut for Richmond on August 12, 1884, when the Virginians joined the Association as a late season replacement team. He started 22 games that season, completed all of them, and threw one shutout. In 179 innings pitched, he struck out 106 batters, and had a 4.32 ERA along with a 7–12 win–loss record. After the season ended, the Virginians folded.

For the 1885 season, Meegan joined the Pittsburgh Alleghenys, and had a 7–8 win–loss record in 18 games pitched. He started 16 of those games, completed 14, and recorded one shutout. He also struck out 58 batters in 146 innings pitched. This was his last Major League season.

== Post-career ==
Meegan died in his hometown of San Francisco at the age of 42, and is interred at Holy Cross Cemetery in Colma, California.
