= Billy Nash =

American baseball player, manager, and umpire (1865–1929)

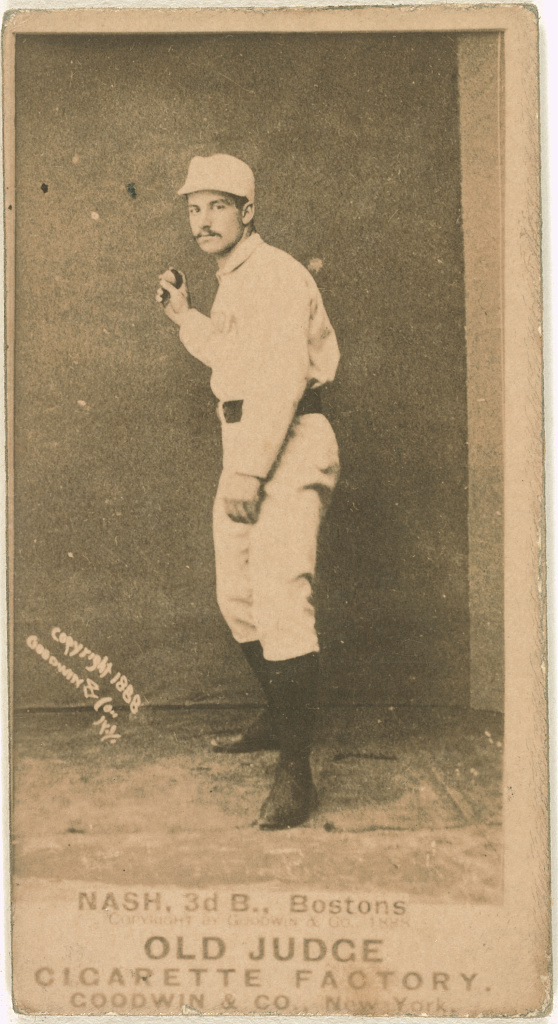
- 1888 card of Nash
- Third baseman
- Born: August 15, 1865; Richmond, Virginia, U.S.
- Died: November 15, 1929 (aged 64); East Orange, New Jersey, U.S.
- Batted: Right Threw: Right

MLB debut
- August 5, 1884, for the Richmond Virginians

Last MLB appearance
- May 28, 1898, for the Philadelphia Phillies

MLB statistics
- Batting average: .275
- Home runs: 60
- Runs batted in: 983
- Stats at Baseball Reference

Teams
- As player: Richmond Virginians (1884); Boston Beaneaters (1885–1889); Boston Reds (1890); Boston Beaneaters (1891–1895); Philadelphia Phillies (1896–1898); As manager: Philadelphia Phillies (1896)

Career highlights and awards
- Players' League pennant (1890); 3x National League pennant (1891-1893)

William Mitchell Nash (June 24, 1865 – November 15, 1929) was an American Major League Baseball third baseman. He played 15 seasons in the majors, from 1884 to 1898. He served as player-manager of the Philadelphia Phillies in 1896, and in 1901 he umpired 101 games in the National League.

== Career statistics ==
Nash entered the professional leagues with his hometown team the Richmond Virginians of the American Association in 1884 as a nineteen-year-old. He played 45 games and batted .199. He joined the Boston Beaneaters in 1885. He batted .255 in 26 games. He would play 10 of his next 11 seasons with the Beaneaters, with the 1890 season being the exception when Nash joined the Players' League that was filled with stars that left for greener pastures. He batted a career-best in 1887 with a .295 season in 121 games and also stole a career-high 43 bases. Nash participated in one postseason series in the 1892 World Series (the last of the "pre-modern World Series" matchups), in which the National League matched up the two champions of the first and second half to a best-of-nine series. Nash batted .167 with just four hits but Boston won in six games. He was traded to the Philadelphia Phillies for Billy Hamilton in 1896, where he closed out his last three seasons (with his first season seeing him serve as player-manager), batting over .240 in each year before electing to stop playing on May 28 after playing just 20 games in the 1898 season. He became a minor league manager in Buffalo and Hartford after his playing days ended.

In 15 seasons, Nash played 1,553 games, compiling a .275 batting average (1616-5867), with 271 doubles, 87 triples, 60 home runs, 983 RBIs, 805 walks to 414 strikeouts, a .367 on-base percentage, and a .382 slugging percentage.

== Person life ==
He ran a variety of jobs after finishing baseball, such as managing a hotel in Buffalo, umpiring for a time in 1901 and studying for a MD to serve in the medical department in Wrentham, Massachusetts. While inspecting a medical facility in East Orange, New Jersey, he had a fatal heart attack at 64 on November 15, 1929.

== See also ==
- List of Major League Baseball career runs scored leaders
- List of Major League Baseball player-managers
