= Marshall Quinton =

American baseball player (1852–1904)

- Catcher / Outfielder
- Born: 1852; Philadelphia, Pennsylvania, U.S.
- Died: June 19, 1904 (aged 51–52); Trenton, New Jersey, U.S.
- Batted: Unknown Threw: Unknown

MLB debut
- August 7, 1884, for the Richmond Virginians

Last MLB appearance
- June 25, 1885, for the Philadelphia Athletics

MLB statistics
- Batting average: .228
- Home runs: 0
- Runs batted in: 4
- Stats at Baseball Reference

Teams
- Richmond Virginians (1884); Philadelphia Athletics (1885)

Marshall J. Quinton (1852 – June 19, 1904) was an American professional baseball catcher. He played in the American Association for the 1884 Richmond Virginians and 1885 Philadelphia Athletics. He played in the minors from 1877 to 1889.
