= Philadelphia Athletics (1890–1891) =

Information
- League: American Association (1891)
- Location: Philadelphia, Pennsylvania
- Ballpark: Forepaugh Park
- Founded: 1890
- Folded: 1891
- Nickname(s): Athletics, Quakers
- Last season: 141–129–5
- Former league: Players' League (1890)
- Manager: George Wood (1891); Bill Sharsig (1891); Charlie Buffinton (1890); Jim Fogarty (1890)

The Philadelphia Athletics were a short-lived Major League Baseball franchise that existed for two seasons from 1890 to 1891. Known alternatively as the Philadelphia Quakers, and sometimes informally as "Buffinton's Beauties", they played their first season in the newly created Players' League (PL) of 1890, and were managed by Jim Fogarty and Charlie Buffinton. After the demise of the PL following the 1890 season, the team switched to the American Association (AA) for the 1891 season, and were managed by Bill Sharsig and George Wood. For each season, the franchise used Forepaugh Park as their home field.

Before the 1890 season, the PL was founded by the first organized professional sports union, the Brotherhood of Professional Base Ball Players, in an attempt to compete with the existing major leagues, the National League (NL) and the AA. Their intent was to break free from the standard business practices of the two leagues that they claimed stifled players' salaries; such as the reserve clause, and the Brush Classification System, as well as their ability to sell players to another team without the consent of the player. The Quakers were controlled by a group of investors, which included brothers G. W. and J. Earl Wagner.

Under the pressure of PL investors, who were seeking recoupment of massive financial losses following the 1890 season, pressured the Brotherhood to compromise with the NL and AA. The deal called for the dissolution of the league, while allowing the players to return to their old teams without penalty, with the reserve clause and the selling of players, without their consent, outlawed. The Quakers were allowed entrance into the AA for 1891 season and claimed the nickname of the team they were replacing, the Philadelphia Athletics, who had been expelled for violating the league constitution.

Although many players departed for new teams for the 1891 season, including Buffinton, Shindle, and Mike Griffin, they were able to sign suitable replacements, such as Gus Weyhing, Elton Chamberlain, and Pop Corkhill. The team completed the season with a 73–66 win–loss record, with four ties, placing them fifth among nine teams. Following the 1891 season, the AA could no longer operate due to great financial losses, and were forced to fold, with four teams being consolidated with the NL, and the others accepting buyouts. The Athletics fell into the latter group, and ceased operations. Pitcher Bert Cunningham set a dubious record when he threw five wild pitches in one inning on September 15, 1890, a record that would go unmatched for 110 years until Rick Ankiel tied it in a playoff game.

== See also ==
- Philadelphia Athletics (1890–1891) all-time roster
- 1890 Philadelphia Athletics (PL) season
- 1891 Philadelphia Athletics season
