= J. Earl Wagner =

American businessman

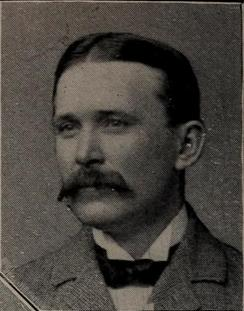
- Wagner in the 1899 Spalding guide
- Born: Jacob Earl Wagner; November 6, 1861; York, Pennsylvania, U.S.
- Died: November 11, 1943 (aged 82)
- Occupation: Businessman

Jacob Earl Wagner (November 6, 1861 – November 11, 1943) was a businessman from Philadelphia, Pennsylvania. He is primarily known as the owner of various baseball teams during the late 19th century, most notably the original Washington Senators. Along with his brother, George W. Wagner, Wagner owned the Senators from their entry into the National League in 1892 until 1899.

== Early life ==
Wagner was born in York, Pennsylvania. His family moved to Baltimore, Maryland in 1876, and he later moved to Philadelphia with his brother George in 1893-94. Prior to their ownership of the Senators, Wagner and his brother were associates in the Armour meat-packing firm.

== Athletics: 1890-91 ==
In 1890, he became the owner of the Philadelphia Athletics of the Players' League. After the PL folded at the end of that season, Wagner joined a syndicate of PL owners, led by Al Johnson of the Cleveland Infants, that purchased the Cincinnati Reds. However, the purchase was revoked by the National League. Instead, Wagner settled for his own Athletics being admitted to the American Association for the 1891 season.

== Senators: 1892-1899 ==
When the AA also folded after the 1891 season, the Athletics were not among the teams absorbed into the NL, which already had a team in Philadelphia. Wagner then purchased the Senators, another AA franchise which was brought into the National League. When the league contracted following the 1899 season, Wagner received $39,000 from the league for his interest in the club.
