= Falls, Pennsylvania =

- Unincorporated community
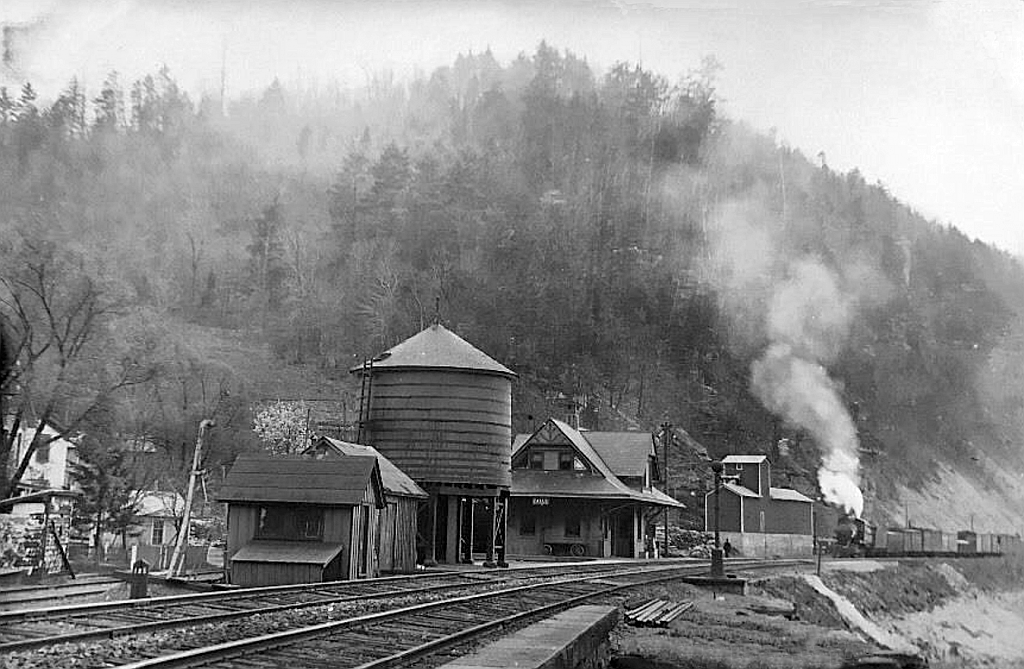
- Railroad station in Falls, 1910

- Location within Pennsylvania
- Coordinates: 41°27′38″N 75°50′56″W
- Country: United States
- State: Pennsylvania
- County: Wyoming
- Elevation: 607 ft (185 m)
- Time zone: UTC-5 (Eastern (EST))
  - Summer (DST): UTC-4 (EDT)
- ZIP code: 18615
- Area codes: 272 & 570
- GNIS feature ID: 1198721

Falls is an unincorporated community in Wyoming County, Pennsylvania, United States. The community is located along the Susquehanna River, 10.3 miles (16.6 km) west-northwest of downtown Scranton. Falls has a post office with ZIP code 18615.
