= Kid Madden =

American baseball player (1866–1896)

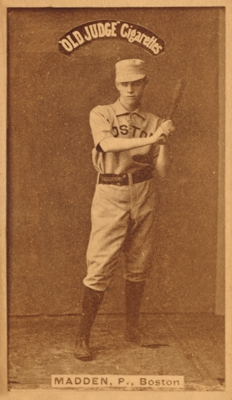
- Pitcher
- Born: October 22, 1866; Portland, Maine, U.S.
- Died: March 16, 1896 (aged 29); Portland, Maine, U.S.
- Batted: Left Threw: Left

MLB debut
- May 6, 1887, for the Boston Beaneaters

Last MLB appearance
- October 6, 1891, for the Baltimore Orioles

MLB statistics
- Win–loss record: 54–50
- Earned run average: 3.92
- Strikeouts: 284
- Stats at Baseball Reference

Teams
- Boston Beaneaters (1887–1889); Boston Reds (PL/AA) (1890–1891); Baltimore Orioles (1891)

Michael Joseph "Kid" Madden (October 22, 1866 – March 16, 1896) was an American Major League Baseball player who pitched for three different teams from 1887 to 1891. He played for the Boston Braves, Boston Reds, and Baltimore Orioles. Madden died of "consumption" (tuberculosis) at the age of 29 in his hometown of Portland, Maine, leaving behind a widow and two children. He is interred at South Portland's Calvary Cemetery.
