= Arthur Irwin =

American baseball player and manager (1858–1921)

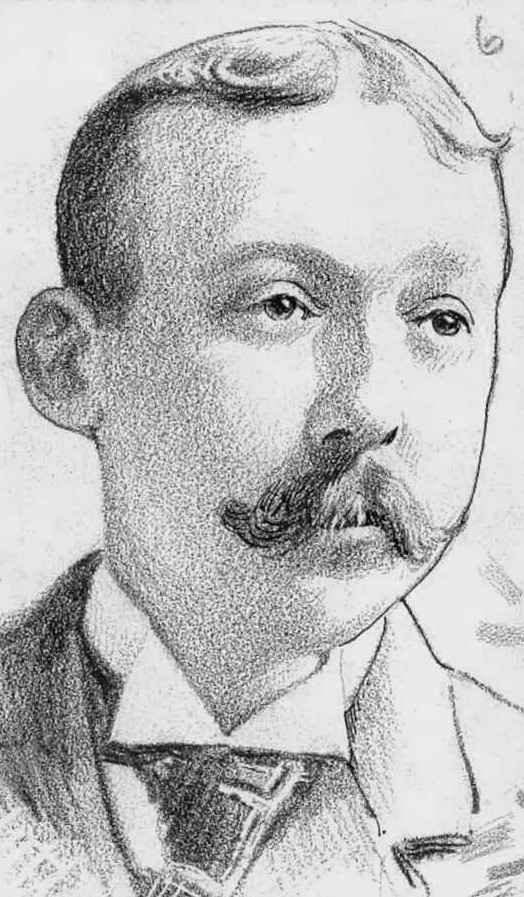
- Shortstop / Manager
- Born: February 14, 1858; Toronto, Canada West
- Died: July 16, 1921 (aged 63); Atlantic Ocean
- Batted: Left Threw: Right

MLB debut
- May 1, 1880, for the Worcester Ruby Legs

Last MLB appearance
- June 22, 1894, for the Philadelphia Phillies

MLB statistics
- Batting average: .241
- Home runs: 5
- Runs batted in: 396
- Stats at Baseball Reference

Teams
- As player: Worcester Worcesters (1880–1882); Providence Grays (1883–1885); Philadelphia Phillies (1886–1889); Washington Nationals (1889); Boston Reds (1890–1891); Philadelphia Phillies (1894); As manager: Washington Nationals (1889); Boston Reds (1891); Philadelphia Phillies (1894–1895); New York Giants (1896); Washington Senators (1898–1899)

Member of the Canadian

Baseball Hall of Fame
- Induction: 1989

Arthur Albert Irwin (February 14, 1858 – July 16, 1921), nicknamed "Doc", "Sandy", "Cutrate" or "Foxy", was a Canadian-American shortstop and manager in Major League Baseball (MLB) during the late nineteenth century. He played regularly in the major leagues for eleven years, spending two of those seasons as a player-manager. He played on the 1884 Providence Grays team which won the first interleague series to decide the world champions of baseball. Irwin then served as a major league manager for several years.

Irwin occupied numerous baseball roles in the latter years of his career, having spent time as a college baseball coach, a major league scout and business manager, a minor league owner and manager, and a National League umpire. For most of Irwin's career, the collegiate and professional baseball schedules allowed him to hold positions at both levels in the same year.

Irwin also produced several innovations which impacted sports. He took the field with the first baseball fielder's glove, invented a type of football scoreboard, promoted motor-paced cycling tracks and ran a short-lived professional soccer league.

Irwin became terminally ill with cancer in the last weeks of his life. Shortly after his death from an apparent suicide, Irwin made headlines when it was discovered that two wives and families survived him in separate cities. He had been married to one woman since the 1880s and to the other since the 1890s. He was posthumously elected to the Canadian Baseball Hall of Fame in 1989.

== Early life ==
Arthur Irwin was born in 1858 in Toronto, Canada West, to an Irish blacksmith and a Canadian mother. As a child, he moved with his family to Boston and attended school there. He played local amateur baseball from 1873 until he was recruited by the Worcester team of the National Association in 1879.

In late 1879, manager Frank Bancroft took Irwin and most of the other Worcester players on a baseball tour which included visits to New Orleans and Cuba. The team, which traveled under the name of the Hop Bitters (the usual nickname of a different National Association team), returned to the United States after only a few days due to financial and contractual difficulties. The team may have played as few as two games in Cuba.

== Baseball career ==
=== Playing days ===
Irwin's major league career began when the Ruby Legs moved into the National League (NL) in 1880. He led the league in assists in his rookie season, and remained with the team through 1882, when it folded due to poor attendance. Irwin next spent three seasons with the Providence Grays, and was captain and starting shortstop of the 1884 Providence team that became world champions. The 1884 Grays featured star pitchers Charles Radbourn and Charlie Sweeney; the two hurlers did not get along well, and Sweeney left the team in the middle of the season. The club folded after a fourth-place finish in 1885.

Irwin moved on to the recently formed Philadelphia Phillies in 1886 where he was named team captain during spring training. Tragedy struck the Philadelphia squad in 1888 when pitcher Charlie Ferguson developed typhoid fever, dying at Irwin's home.

During the 1889 season, Irwin went to the Washington Nationals for his first opportunity as player-manager, although the team folded at the end of the season. He next played for the Boston Reds in the Players' League in 1890. That same year, Irwin coached the baseball team at Dartmouth College. While Irwin served as a player-manager for Boston in 1890, he was able to focus on the managerial role for the team in 1891. That year the team signed his brother, John Irwin, on May 21. Newspapers brought accusations of nepotism and criticized John's mediocre play. John Irwin was released by Boston on July 16, and his major league playing career was over by the next month.

Although Irwin's regular playing career ended after the 1890 season, he appeared in six games while managing the Boston team after it moved to the American Association in 1891. He also played in one game while managing the 1894 Philadelphia Phillies. A left-handed hitter, Irwin finished his playing career with 1,015 games played and batted .241 in 4,190 plate appearances. He tallied 396 runs batted in and 552 runs scored. Stolen bases were not awarded until 1886, but Irwin tallied 93 stolen bases in his last 532 games. He recorded an .878 career fielding percentage, committing 647 errors in 5,317 fielding chances. Irwin played 947 games at shortstop and 56 games at third base. He also appeared at second base, pitcher and catcher.

=== Early non-playing roles ===
Irwin coached at the University of Pennsylvania between 1893 and 1895, and managed the Philadelphia major league club during those last two seasons.

In 1894, he angered Penn supporters when a talented first baseman named Goeckle nearly signed with Irwin's major league team just prior to a series of collegiate championship games. Nonetheless, by 1895, Irwin's coaching role at Penn included the selection of players and other duties that traditionally fell to the team captain. Irwin left Philadelphia in 1896 to manage the New York Giants. Relieved of his duties after one season in New York, he was subsequently recruited to manage in Milwaukee. However, he returned to coach the minor league team in his native Toronto instead.

Irwin coached Toronto during 1897 and 1898. He faced arrest on a libel charge in 1898, which stemmed from comments made by Irwin about the actions of the Philadelphia ownership during his time there. Though Irwin turned himself in, it appears that he was never arrested. In 1898, Irwin traded some of his best players to the Washington major league team. The moves were seen as particularly suspect when Irwin was named the Washington manager shortly thereafter. After 1899, Irwin did not return to the major leagues as a coach. He returned for a subsequent term as Penn's coach in 1900, but he left in 1902. In August 1902, Irwin was signed as an NL umpire for the remainder of that season. Irwin, who had previously only filled in for one three-day umpiring stretch in 1881, umpired his first NL game on August 7, 1902. His last umpiring appearance came with the end of the 1902 season on October 3. In fifty games as an umpire, Irwin ejected nine players, including future Hall of Fame inductees Roger Bresnahan and Fred Clarke. In 1903, he was hired to manage the Rochester Beau Brummels minor league team, but was replaced midseason. Irwin, who had retained partial ownership of the Toronto club, then returned to manage that team for a couple of seasons.

By 1906, Irwin was manager of the Altoona Mountaineers in the Tri-State League. In July 1907, Irwin resigned as manager of the Mountaineers after fans became disgruntled. Even after entering baseball scouting, Irwin briefly managed the 1908 Washington club in the short-lived Union Professional League. The league was plagued by financial problems—including the inability to pay players at times—and it folded less than two months after play began. He was rehired to the Penn coaching staff in 1908.

=== Scouting ===
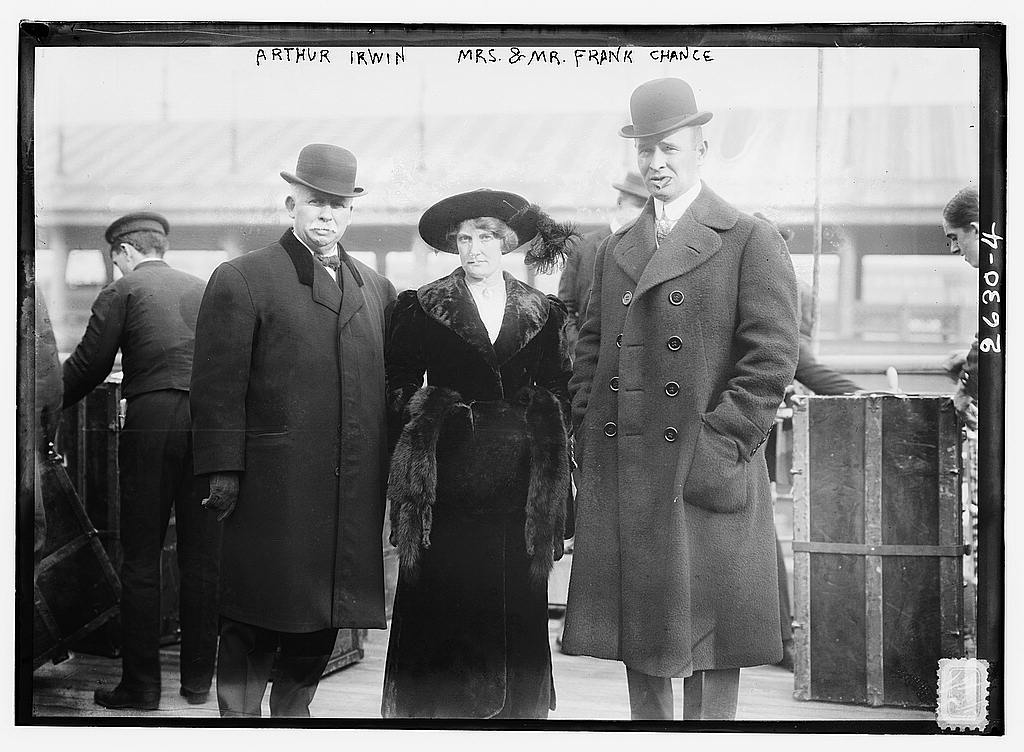
Irwin (left) with Mr. and Mrs. Frank Chance, 1913

In the summer of 1907, Irwin became a scout for the New York Highlanders. In 1909, New York manager George Stallings rented an apartment overlooking Hilltop Park and sent Irwin up to steal signs from the opposing team. Using a system of binoculars and mirrors, Irwin read the signs and flashed them back to Stallings so they could be relayed to the batter. By 1912, almost the entire Highlanders roster had been scouted by Irwin. In a newspaper interview covering his scouting career, Irwin asserted that he preferred signing young prospects over expensive stars. "The chances are better with a young player, for by getting him early you can gradually break him into the style of play the team is using", he said.

In December 1912, New York president Frank J. Farrell promoted Irwin from scout to business manager. Upon his promotion, a statement from the team said, "He has been of such service to the club in numerous ways that Mr. Farrell has invested him with full power to look after business details in future." The poor relationship between Irwin and New York manager Frank Chance was a factor in the manager's 1914 resignation after two years of a three-year contract. The New York Times said that Chance "did not think it was possible to collect so many mediocre players on one major league club." Irwin remained with the Highlanders until Farrell sold the team to Jacob Ruppert and T.L. Huston. Upon the sale of the team, Irwin and several other Highlanders personnel submitted their resignations.

=== Later coaching career ===
Irwin became part-owner of the Lewiston Cupids in 1915 and managed that club in the final season of the original New England League. The 1915 Cupids featured 16-year-old Cuban pitcher Oscar Tuero, who won 17 games in his third professional season. The team did not win the pennant that year, but the race came down to the final days of the season. Irwin and Christy Mathewson were considered for a coaching position at Harvard College that year, but former Highlanders catcher and professional scout Fred Mitchell was ultimately selected. In 1916, Irwin publicly accused Philadelphia's Connie Mack of underhanded dealings in obtaining third baseman Jim Ritter from Baltimore. He said that Mack convinced the New England League's Baltimore club to draft Ritter so that Mack could later obtain him cheaply. Mack was outraged at the accusations and immediately severed all connections with the player. Ritter never appeared in a major league game.

Irwin managed the Rochester Hustlers between 1918 and 1920. Rochester was not successful under Irwin; the 1920 Hustlers finished with 45 wins and 106 losses. Cray L. Remington of the Rochester Evening Journal later wrote, "Local fans used to pan Arthur Irwin in the old days when Arthur was as innocent of wrong as the little sparrows on the limbs. Arthur's job was to win ball games minus talent. He couldn't do it." While managing the Eastern League's Hartford Senators in 1921 against a New York semi-pro team, Irwin noticed the play of Lou Gehrig and convinced him to sign his first professional contract with Hartford. Gehrig had already committed to play at Columbia University and professional experience would affect his collegiate eligibility, so he began playing for Hartford using assumed names like Lou Lewis. However, Columbia found out about Gehrig's play and the slugger was forced to sit out of college baseball for a year.

== Sports innovations ==
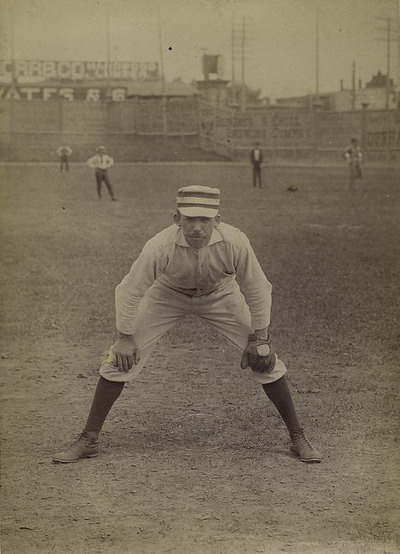
Arthur Irwin with the Irwin glove

While playing with Providence in 1883, Irwin broke the third and fourth fingers of his left hand. Not wanting to miss any games, he obtained an oversized buckskin driving glove, padded it and sewed the third and fourth fingers together to allow space for bandages. He used the glove even after his fingers healed. John Montgomery Ward of New York soon took the field with a similar glove. By the following season, almost every professional player was using the "Irwin glove." Prior to 1884, use of gloves was limited to first basemen and catchers. In 1882, Irwin committed a league-high 78 errors in 84 games. He committed 66 errors in 98 games the following year. Over his next two seasons with the glove, Irwin committed 98 errors in 163 games.

Irwin organized and was president of the American League of Professional Football (ALPF) for its lone season in 1894. The organization represented the first American professional soccer league. Teams in the league were named after their MLB counterparts in the same cities. Some of the active baseball managers served as coaches for the soccer teams, and fans were sometimes enticed by the rumor of MLB players who might participate in the league. Irwin was also involved in an attempt to popularize roller polo.

While superintendent of physical culture at the University of Pennsylvania, Irwin developed and patented a football scoreboard, which was in use in the Ivy League by the 1890s. The large scoreboard featured a miniature representation of a football field, and the ball moved along the board to report each play. By 1915, Irwin's scoreboards were featured at each end of the field for the Army-Navy game at the Polo Grounds.

== Other influence ==
Irwin owned athletic facilities in Atlantic City, New Jersey, and negotiated with baseball officials about bringing organized baseball there in 1900. Irwin opened a motor-paced bicycle racing track in the city in July 1902. His focus on the bicycle track enterprise had been a factor in his resignation from the Penn coaching staff in 1902. He also became involved with the Hartford Avenue Colosseum Company and oversaw its Philadelphia bicycle track.

== Death ==
On June 21, 1921, Irwin gave up his managerial role with the Hartford club in the Eastern League due to health concerns. He was experiencing abdominal trouble and severe nervous attacks. Irwin was diagnosed with stomach cancer; he had lost 60 pounds in two weeks. While in the hospital, he was told that he only had a few days to live. While traveling from New York City to Boston on the vessel Calvin Austin, Irwin was lost overboard in an apparent suicide on July 16. Shortly after his death, a theory emerged that Irwin had been robbed for $5,000 and then murdered aboard the ship. This theory was discounted when it was learned from family members that Irwin had taken only $35 on the trip. When Irwin was last seen aboard the ship around midnight on July 16, he told a friend that he was "coming home to his brother John's to die."

During the investigation into Irwin's disappearance and death, two widows emerged; one lived in Boston and the other lived in New York. He first married Elizabeth, the woman in Boston, in 1883. Together they had three children, including a son who was 37 at the time of Irwin's death, and nine grandchildren. In the 1890s he married again, this time in Philadelphia to May, a woman he met while coaching baseball at the University of Pennsylvania. They settled in New York and had a son who was 24 when Irwin died.

In his final days, Irwin sold his rights from his scoreboard business for $2000. Though he sent $1500 to May and only $500 to Elizabeth, his Boston widow was surprised at the gesture since Irwin rarely visited Boston and provided almost no financial support to their family. In fact, May said that he had not been away from New York for more than a few days at a time in 27 years. She said that his only long trips were baseball-related, when he would scout players in other cities. Before he left New York for the final time, he told May that he was going to say goodbye to friends in Boston and that he would return to New York. Though neither woman knew of the other, Irwin's New York son Harold learned about an unknown brother while he was visiting his father in the hospital just before Irwin's death.

In 1989, Irwin was posthumously inducted into the Canadian Baseball Hall of Fame.

== See also ==
- List of Major League Baseball player–managers
- List of Major League Baseball umpires (disambiguation)
