= Morgan Murphy (baseball) =

American baseball player (1867–1938)

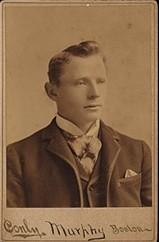
- Catcher
- Born: February 14, 1867; East Providence, Rhode Island, U.S.
- Died: October 3, 1938 (aged 71); Providence, Rhode Island, U.S.
- Batted: Right Threw: Right

MLB debut
- April 22, 1890, for the Boston Reds

Last MLB appearance
- May 31, 1901, for the Philadelphia Athletics

MLB statistics
- Batting average: .225
- Games: 566
- Runs scored: 247
- Stats at Baseball Reference

Teams
- Boston Reds (PL/AA) (1890–1891); Cincinnati Reds (1892–1895); St. Louis Browns (1896–1897); Pittsburgh Pirates (1898); Philadelphia Phillies (1898), (1900); Philadelphia Athletics (AL) (1901)

Morgan Edward Murphy (February 14, 1867 – October 3, 1938) was an American Major League Baseball player who played 11 seasons as a catcher, most notably with the two time league champions Boston Reds.

== Sign stealing ==
Murphy is mostly known today for his complicated, but innovative sign stealing techniques. When he was playing for the Philadelphia Phillies in 1898, he is credited as the inventor of a scheme where he positioned himself, along with a pair of field glasses, behind a whiskey advertisement on the outfield wall. There was a specific letter "O" that he would open or close to signal to the batter what pitch was going to be delivered. Later, in 1900, he devised another scheme where he was still placed behind the outfield wall, but instead would relay the catcher's signs by wire to a buzzer box inside the third base coach's box. The third base coach would then signal to the batter the sign. This latest scheme was discovered, however, when Tommy Corcoran of the Cincinnati Reds, tripped over he thought to be a vine coming out from under the ground, as he was rounding third base. Upon further inspection, the vine turned out to be a telegraph wire, and he proceeded to pull up out of the ground until it reach the spot where Murphy relayed his signals.

== Post-career ==
Murphy died at the age of 71 in Providence, Rhode Island, and is interred at St. Francis Cemetery in Pawtucket, Rhode Island.
