= Dick Johnston =

American baseball player (1863–1934)

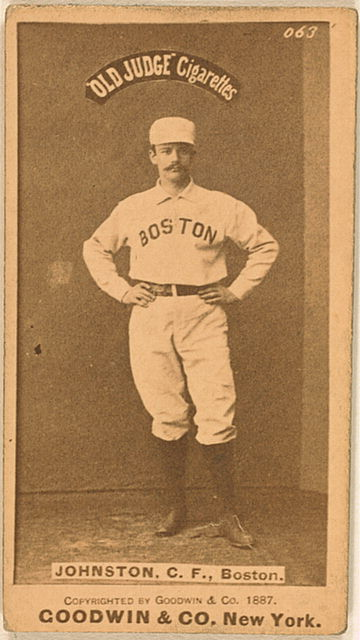
- Outfielder
- Born: April 6, 1863; Kingston, New York, U.S.
- Died: April 4, 1934 (aged 70); Detroit, Michigan, U.S.
- Batted: Right Threw: Right

MLB debut
- August 12, 1884, for the Richmond Virginians

Last MLB appearance
- August 16, 1891, for the Cincinnati Kelly's Killers

MLB statistics
- Batting average: .251
- Hits: 751
- Runs batted in: 386
- Stats at Baseball Reference

Teams
- Richmond Virginians (1884); Boston Beaneaters (1885–1889); Boston Reds (1890); New York Giants (PL) (1890); Cincinnati Kelly's Killers (1891)

Career highlights and awards
- Led NL in triples in 1888

Richard Frederick Johnston (April 6, 1863 – April 4, 1934) was a 19th-century American center fielder in Major League Baseball. He played eight seasons in the majors, for five different teams in three different leagues.

In 746 games over eight seasons, Johnston posted a .251 batting average (751-for-2992) with 453 runs, 33 home runs, 386 RBIs and 151 stolen bases.

== See also ==
- List of Major League Baseball annual triples leaders

== Sources ==
- Career statistics from MLB · Baseball Reference · Fangraphs · Baseball Reference (Minors) · Retrosheet · Baseball Almanac
