= Charlie Buffinton =

American baseball player (1861–1907)

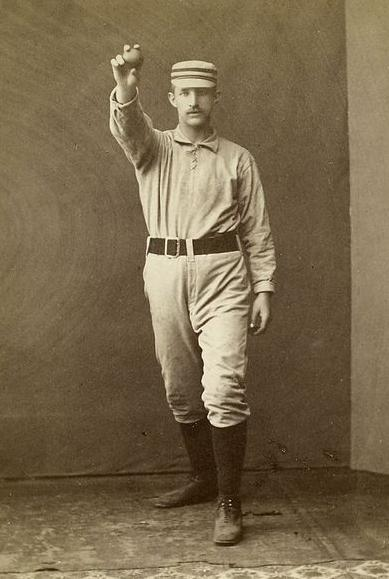
- Buffinton in 1887
- Pitcher
- Born: June 14, 1861; Fall River, Massachusetts, U.S.
- Died: September 23, 1907 (aged 46); Fall River, Massachusetts, U.S.
- Batted: Right Threw: Right

MLB debut
- May 17, 1882, for the Boston Red Stockings

Last MLB appearance
- June 28, 1892, for the Baltimore Orioles

MLB statistics
- Win–loss record: 233–152
- Earned run average: 2.96
- Strikeouts: 1,700
- Stats at Baseball Reference

Teams
- As player: Boston Red Stockings/Beaneaters (1882–1886); Philadelphia Quakers (1887–1889); Philadelphia Athletics (1890); Boston Reds (1891); Baltimore Orioles (1892); As manager: Philadelphia Athletics (1890)

Charles G. Buffinton (June 14, 1861 – September 23, 1907) was an American right-handed pitcher in Major League Baseball from 1882 to 1892. One of the workhorse pitchers of the 1880s, he won 20 games seven times and his 1,700 career strikeouts are the ninth-highest total of the 19th century.

== Career ==
Born in Fall River, Massachusetts, Buffinton—mainly known for his brilliant sinker ball—began his career with the Boston Red Stockings/Beaneaters. He played in the days of 2- or 3-man pitching staffs and was a big part of many of his teams' successes. From 1883 to 1885 he was one of Boston's two principal pitchers along with Jim Whitney; together they picked up 62 of Boston's 63 wins in 1883 when the Beaneaters took the pennant. Buffinton's best season came right after that, though, when he went 48–16 with a 2.15 ERA in 67 starts in 1884. During that season, he struck out 17 batters in one game, won 13 straight games, and ended the year with 417 strikeouts, becoming one of seven pitchers that season to break the previous record of 361. Typical of the era, he completed 63 of his starts, with 8 being shutouts. Such win totals were not completely extraordinary at the time, as Buffinton's only 30-win season ranked third in the major leagues that year as Charles Radbourn set a record with 59 wins.

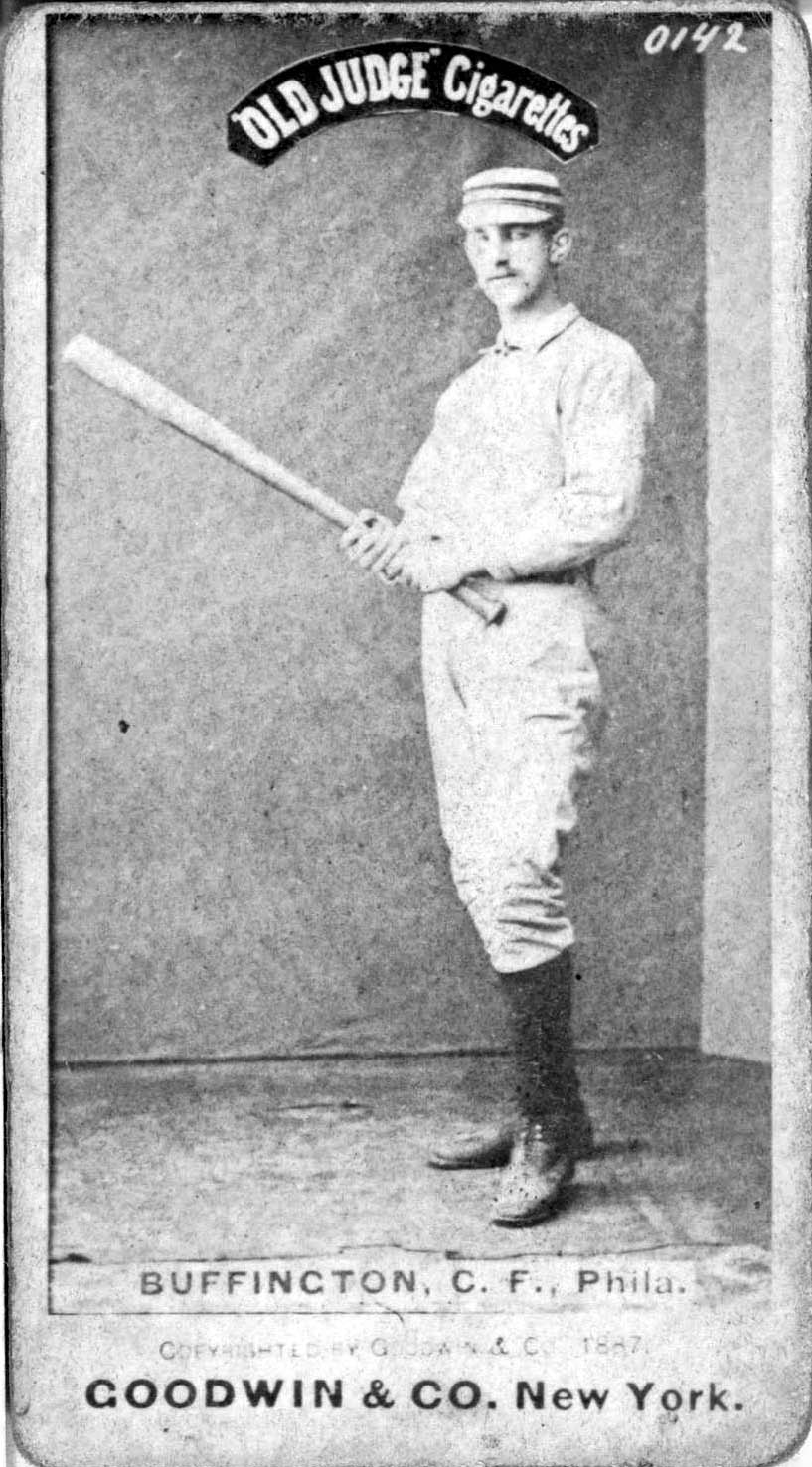
Charlie Buffinton baseball card, circa 1890

After a poor 1886 season which saw him drop to 7–10 in more limited play due to arm trouble, his contract was sold to the Philadelphia Quakers in 1887. He pitched two one-hitters in a row for the team at one point and became the mainstay of their staff during his three years there, winning over 20 games in each. He jumped to the Philadelphia Athletics of the Players' League in 1890, posting a 19–15 record and managing the team for most of the year, before shifting to the American Association's Boston Reds in 1891. In Boston, he enjoyed a 29–9 year for the league champions – his last 20-win campaign. After a 4–8 record with the Baltimore Orioles in 1892, he retired rather than accept a midseason pay cut and went into business as an investor in coal and cotton. In 1893 the pitching distance in baseball was increased from 50 feet to 60 feet 6 inches, effectively ending his chances of returning.

In an 11-year career, Buffinton had a record of 233–152 with a 2.96 ERA in 414 games (396 starts). He pitched 351 complete games, including 30 shutouts, struck out 1,700 and allowed 1,120 earned runs in 3,404 innings pitched. At the time of his retirement he ranked between seventh and tenth in virtually every career pitching category, although due to the short history of the major leagues all of those ahead of him were his contemporaries. As the 1890s progressed he quickly dropped further down the lists. During his career, he also played as an outfielder for 137 games, and batted .245 for his career.

== Death ==
Buffinton died in Fall River, Massachusetts, at the age of 46 from heart disease. He was laid to rest at the Oak Grove Cemetery in Fall River.

== See also ==
- List of Major League Baseball career ERA leaders
- List of Major League Baseball career wins leaders
- List of Major League Baseball player-managers
- List of Major League Baseball career innings pitched leaders

Preceded by Jim Fogarty	Philadelphia Quakers/Athletics (PL/AA) Managers; 1890	Succeeded by Bill Sharsig
