= Boston Reds (1890–1891) =

Baseball team (1890–91)

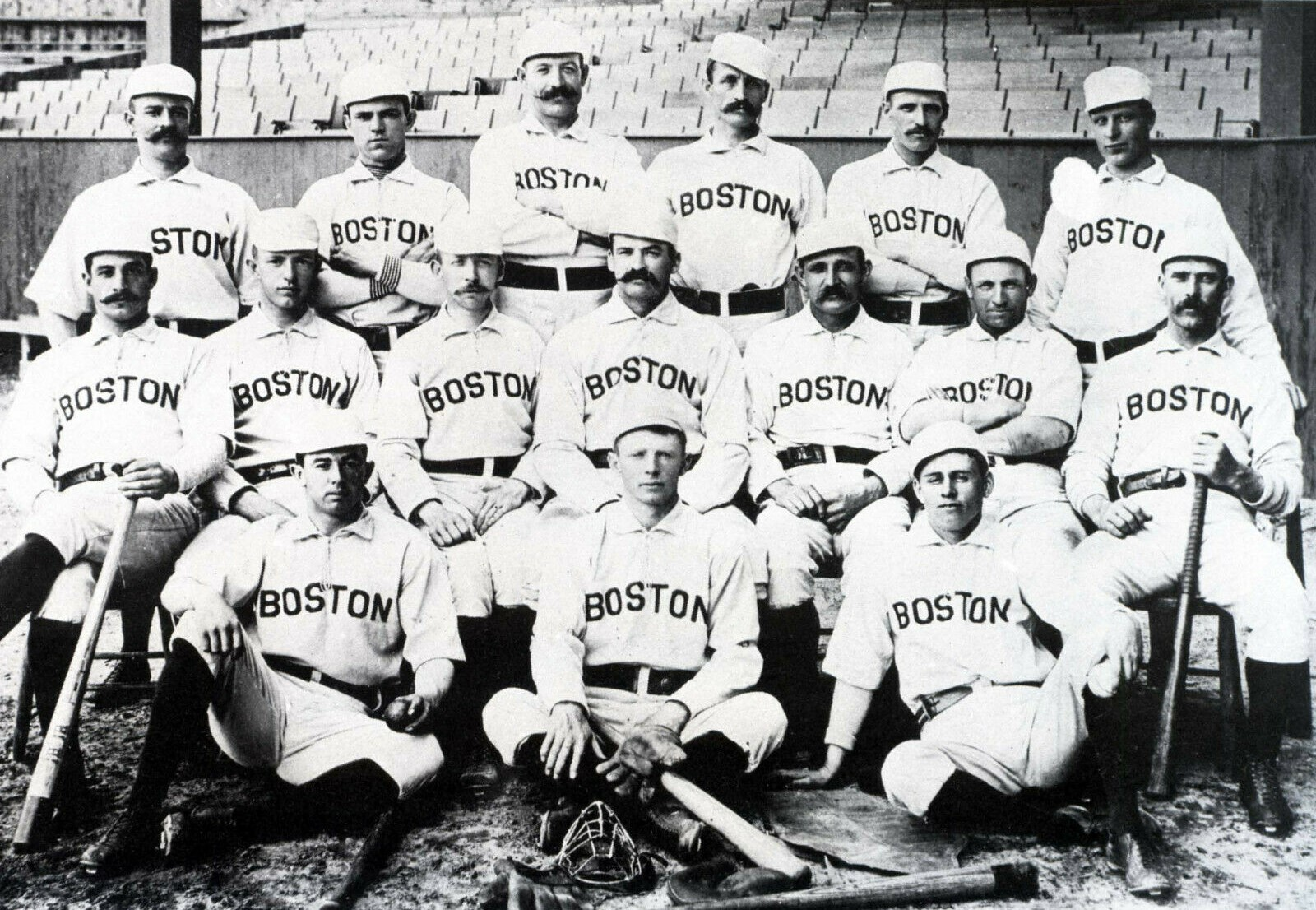
- Logo The 1890 Boston Reds

Information
- League: American Association (1891)
- Location: Boston, Massachusetts
- Ballpark: Congress Street Grounds (1890–1891)
- Established: 1890
- Folded: 1891
- American Association pennant: 1 (1891)
- Players' League pennant: 1 (1890)
- Former league: Players' League (1890)
- Colors: Red, black, white
- Ownership: George Frazier (1890)
- Manager: List of managers: Arthur Irwin (1891); King Kelly (1890)

The Boston Reds were a 19th-century baseball team located in Boston, Massachusetts that played in the Players' League in 1890 and in the American Association in 1891. They played in the Congress Street Grounds in the 1890s. The team took its name from the successful Boston club of the National Association and National League often known as the (Boston) Red Stockings. The club lasted only two seasons, but in those two seasons they were league champions.

== League play ==
In 1890 the Reds won the Players' League pennant when they finished first ahead of the New York Giants, and then won the American Association pennant when they finished first ahead of the St. Louis Browns (now the Cardinals). The Boston Reds are one of two major league teams to win back-to-back pennants spanning two different leagues. The Brooklyn Dodgers did it also, winning the AA pennant in 1889 and the NL pennant in 1890, while football's Cleveland Browns won the AAFC championship in 1949 and the NFL championship in 1950. The Reds are also the only Major League team that never failed to win a pennant.

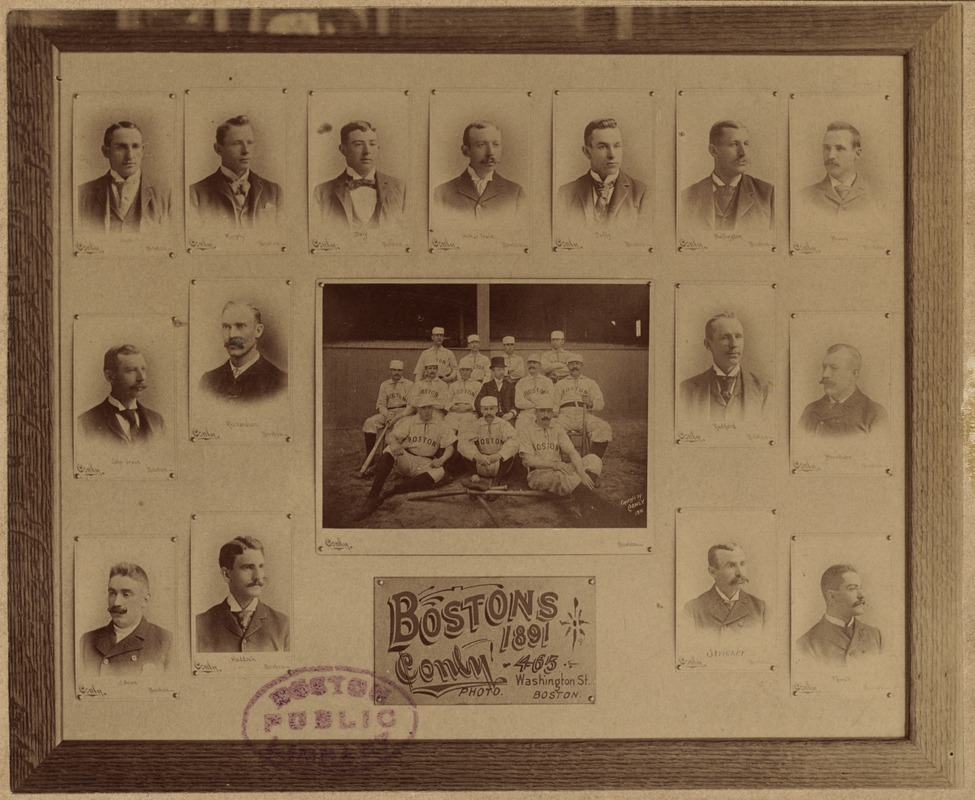
American Association Boston Reds team of 1891. Michael T. "Nuf Ced" McGreevy Collection, Boston Public Library

== Demise ==
At the conclusion of the 1891 season, the National League pressed for the consolidation of the American Association with the National League. Part of the posturing included the National League directing its champion Boston not to play the Reds in a World Series. The leagues settled, adding four AA clubs to a combined circuit. As part of the settlement, the owners of the four clubs not joining the combined circuit, including the Reds, were paid $135,000 and their players dispersed to the surviving clubs.

== Home field ==
Their abandoned ballpark was revived for use by the National League club in 1894, during the weeks that South End Grounds was being rebuilt following a fire. The Congress Street Grounds, with its close left field foul line, quickly gained some more history, as Bobby Lowe hit four home runs in one game there, the first player to accomplish that feat.

== Notable players ==
- Charley Radbourn
- Hugh Duffy
- Clark Griffith
- King Kelly
- Dan Brouthers
- Harry Stovey
- Ad Gumbert
- Hardy Richardson
- Charlie Buffinton
- Joe Quinn

=== Baseball Hall of Famers ===
Boston Reds Hall of Famers
Inductee	Position	Tenure	Inducted
Charley Radbourn	P	1890	1939
Hugh Duffy	OF	1891	1945
Clark Griffith	P	1891	1946
King Kelly	OF/C; Manager	1890	1945
Dan Brouthers	1B	1890–1891	1945

== See also ==
- All-time roster
- 1890 Boston Reds season
- 1891 Boston Reds season
