= Players' League =

Former professional American baseball league

- Sport: Baseball
- Founded: 1890
- Folded: 1890
- President: John Montgomery Ward
- No. of teams: 8
- Country: United States
- Last champion: Boston Reds (1890)

The Players' National League of Professional Base Ball Clubs, popularly known as the Players' League (PL), was a short-lived but star-studded American professional baseball league of the 19th century. The PL was formed by the Brotherhood of Professional Base Ball Players in November 1889, after a dispute over pay with the National League (NL) and American Association (AA). The NL had implemented a reserve clause in 1879, which limited the ability of players to negotiate across teams for their salaries; both the AA and NL had passed a salary cap of US$2,000 per player in 1885, equivalent to $59,752 in 2024; the owners of the NL had agreed to remove the salary cap in 1887 but failed to do so. Major League Baseball (MLB) considers the PL a "major" league for official statistical purposes.

The Brotherhood included most of the best players of the National League. Brotherhood members, led by John Montgomery Ward, left the National League and formed the Players' League after failing to change the lopsided player–management relationship of the National League.

The PL lasted just the one season of 1890, and the Boston franchise won the championship. Although known to historians as the Players' League, newspapers often reported the standings with the shorthand titles of "League," "Association," and "Brotherhood." The PL was well-attended, at least in some cities, but was underfunded, and its owners lacked the confidence to continue beyond the one season.

== Background ==
Professional baseball had existed in America since at least 1871, when the National Association of Professional Base Ball Players (NA) formed; two years earlier the Cincinnati Red Stockings paid salaries to ten of their players. In 1876, the National League (NL) was formed, absorbing six of the best teams from the NA, which then folded. In September 1879, in a secret meeting, the NL established a reserve clause by which teams could "reserve" five players per year that could not sign or negotiate with other teams without permission from the owner of the team on which the reserved player was signed. This was an effort to limit players' salaries to reduce club losses.

By the mid-1880s, the reserve clause had been expanded to eleven players per team, and after the 1885 season the NL and the American Association passed a salary limit of US$2,000 per player, equivalent to $59,752 in 2024. After the change, the Brotherhood of Professional Base Ball Players, an organization once focused on issues such as helping former players' widows, turned to labor issues. The club owners agreed to remove the salary cap in 1887, but reneged on their promise, and instead instituted a "classification system" which limited players' salaries based on their classification on a scale from A–E, "A" players being the highest-paid.

The Brotherhood, which had 107 players in 1886, announced its intention to leave the NL on November 4, 1889. After being advised by Brotherhood lawyers not to incorporate before each individual team incorporated, the PL was launched on December 16, 1889, with clubs from Boston, New York, Philadelphia, Brooklyn, Buffalo, Chicago, Cleveland, and Pittsburgh. Salary for the players for the 1890 season was set to the salary they had received in 1889, except that those affected by the classification system received their 1888 salary. The salaries were paid by gate receipts. In 1968, the MLB's Special Baseball Records Committee determined the PL was a "major league" for official statistical purposes.

== Highlights ==
The Players League Triple Crown leaders were Hall-of-Famer Roger Connor with 14 home runs, Pete Browning with a .373 batting average, and Hardy Richardson with 146 RBI. For pitchers, Mark Baldwin had 34 wins, Silver King had a 2.69 ERA, and Mark Baldwin struck out 211 batters.

On June 21, King threw an unofficial eight-inning no-hitter.

Oddly, in its one season of operation, the Players League saw seven triple plays: the Giants on June 14, the Red Stockings on June 30, the Pirates on July 15, the Pirates again on July 30, the Burghers on August 15, Ward's Wonders on September 6, and the Bisons on September 29.

== Franchises and final standings ==
Locations of teams for the 1890 Players' League season
Players' League

Players' League
Team	W	L	Pct.	GB	Home	Road
Boston Reds	81	48	.628	—	48‍–‍21	33‍–‍27
Brooklyn Ward's Wonders	76	56	.576	6½	46‍–‍19	30‍–‍37
New York Giants	74	57	.565	8	47‍–‍19	27‍–‍38
Chicago Pirates	75	62	.547	10	46‍–‍23	29‍–‍39
Philadelphia Athletics	68	63	.519	14	35‍–‍30	33‍–‍33
Pittsburgh Burghers	60	68	.469	20½	37‍–‍28	23‍–‍40
Cleveland Infants	55	75	.423	26½	31‍–‍30	24‍–‍45
Buffalo Bisons	36	96	.273	46½	23‍–‍42	13‍–‍54

== Legacy ==
The Boston and Philadelphia franchises joined the American Association after the Players' League folded, and both folded together with the AA after the 1891 season. The PL franchises in Brooklyn, New York, Chicago and Pittsburgh each merged with their National League counterparts after the 1890 season.

Although the league was started by the players themselves, essentially as an elaborate job-action to improve their lot, the venture proved to be a setback for them in the longer term. The infamous reserve clause remained intact, and would remain thus for the next 85 years or so. The already-shaky AA had been further weakened by the presence of the PL. The Lou Bierbauer incident, in which the Pittsburgh Alleghenys signed Bierbauer over the objections of the AA's Philadelphia Athletics, the team he had played with before joining the Players' League, caused a schism between the NL and the AA, and the AA failed a year later, reducing the total number of major league teams (and players), giving the remaining owners much greater leverage against the players.

One benefit of the league, from the management standpoint, was the construction of new facilities, several of which were used for a while by the established major league clubs. The most prominent of these was a new Polo Grounds, originally constructed as Brotherhood Park for the New York Giants of the Players League. Afterwards it became the home of the National League's New York Giants from 1891 to 1957 (it was rebuilt in steel and concrete in 1911) and of the New York Mets in their first two seasons. It was also the site of many other famous sporting events through its 75 years of existence.

== See also ==
- Cuban Federation League, an independent league organized by the Cuban players' union in 1947

== Sources ==
- Devine, James R. (1994). "Baseball's Labor Wars in Historical Context: The 1919 Chicago White Sox as a Case-Study in Owner-Player Relations". Marquette Sports Law Review. 5 (1). Marquette University Law School.
- David Pietrusza. Major Leagues: The Formation, Sometimes Absorption and Mostly Inevitable Demise of 18 Professional Baseball Organizations, 1871 to Present. Jefferson, North Carolina: McFarland & Company, 1991 (hardcover, ISBN 0-89950-590-2) and 2005 (softcover, ISBN 0-7864-2530-X).
- Ed Koszarek. The Players League: History Clubs, Ballplyers and Statistics. Jefferson, North Carolina: McFarland, 2006 (softcover, ISBN 0-7864-2079-0).
