= Richmond Virginians (American Association) =

Defunct major league baseball team in Virginia

The Richmond Virginians was a major league baseball team that played in the American Association in 1884. The Virginians thereby became the first major league team in the former Confederacy, as well as the last one until the establishment of the Houston Astros in 1962. The Virginians had a record of 12 wins and 30 losses after replacing the Washington Statesmen, who had dropped out of the league. The Virginians were managed by Felix Moses and played their home games in Allen Pasture, which was located east of the former site of the Robert E. Lee monument.

The Virginians began their existence in the Eastern League in 1884. When the Statesmen folded on August 2, the Virginians were brought into the American Association to complete their schedule. They played their first game on August 5 against the Philadelphia Athletics, losing 14–0. They won their first game on August 7, defeating the Brooklyn Atlantics. They finished the season with two losses to the Toledo Blue Stockings to bring their record to 12–30.

After the season, the AA contracted from 12 teams to 8, with the Virginians being one of the eliminated teams. The Virginians returned to the Eastern League, where they played the 1885 season before folding.

== See also ==
- 1884 Richmond Virginians season
