= Buffalo Bisons all-time roster =

List of baseball players

- The following is a list of players and managers who appeared at least in one game for the original Buffalo Bisons National League franchise from 1879 through 1885.

^{1} - Denotes a player on the 1879 original roster
^{2} - Denotes the first manager
^{3} - Denotes a manager
^{4} - Denotes a Hall of Fame member

== B ==
- Dan Brouthers^{4}
- James Burke

== C ==
- Scrappy Carroll
- Jack Chapman^{3}
- John Clapp^{1,2}
- Chub Collins
- John Connor
- Pete Conway
- Ed Coughlin
- Ed Crane
- Sam Crane^{3}
- Bill Crowley^{1}
- Ed Cushman

== D ==
- Hugh Daily
- Dell Darling
- George Derby
- Buttercup Dickerson
- Tom Dolan
- Denny Driscoll

== E ==
- Dave Eggler^{1}
- Bones Ely
- Dude Esterbrook

== F ==
- John Fischer
- Curry Foley
- Davy Force^{1}
- Chick Fulmer^{1}

== G ==
- Pud Galvin^{1,3,4}

== H ==
- Art Hagan
- Gil Hatfield
- Moxie Hengel
- Joe Hornung^{1}

== K ==
- Tom Kearns
- Jim Keenan
- Doc Kennedy

== L ==
- Arlie Latham
- Steve Libby^{1}
- Jim Lillie
- Jack Lynch

== M ==
- Denny Mack
- Jack Manning
- Jim McCauley
- Jim McDonald
- Bill McGunnigle^{1}
- John Morrissey
- Mike Moynahan
- George Myers

== O ==
- Jim O'Rourke^{3,4}

== P ==
- John Peters
- Dick Phelan
- Tom Poorman
- Blondie Purcell

== R ==
- Charley Radbourn^{4}
- Hardy Richardson^{1}
- Charlie Ritter
- Jack Rowe^{1}

== S ==
- Billy Serad
- Orator Shaffer
- Pop Smith
- Joe Stabell
- Dan Stearns
- Tony Suck
- Sleeper Sullivan
- Ed Swartwood

== W ==
- Oscar Walker^{1}
- Stump Weidman
- Deacon White
- Pete Wood

== Sources ==
- Baseball Reference
