= 1885 Buffalo Bisons season =

1885 Buffalo Bisons
- League: National League
- Ballpark: Olympic Park
- City: Buffalo, New York
- Record: 38–74 (.339)
- League place: 7th
- Owner: Josiah Jewett
- Managers: Pud Galvin, Jack Chapman

The 1885 Buffalo Bisons finished the season with a 38–74 record, good for seventh place in the National League. As things continued to implode on the field, the team ownership sold the whole franchise to the Detroit Wolverines. With all their players gone, the team finished out the season with local amateurs filling in.

== Regular season ==
=== Season standings ===
National League
| Team | W | L | Pct. | GB | Home | Road |
|---|---|---|---|---|---|---|
| Chicago White Stockings | 87 | 25 | .777 | — | 42‍–‍14 | 45‍–‍11 |
| New York Giants | 85 | 27 | .759 | 2 | 51‍–‍10 | 34‍–‍17 |
| Philadelphia Quakers | 56 | 54 | .509 | 30 | 29‍–‍26 | 27‍–‍28 |
| Providence Grays | 53 | 57 | .482 | 33 | 31‍–‍20 | 22‍–‍37 |
| Boston Beaneaters | 46 | 66 | .411 | 41 | 24‍–‍34 | 22‍–‍32 |
| Detroit Wolverines | 41 | 67 | .380 | 44 | 29‍–‍23 | 12‍–‍44 |
| Buffalo Bisons | 38 | 74 | .339 | 49 | 19‍–‍34 | 19‍–‍40 |
| St. Louis Maroons | 36 | 72 | .333 | 49 | 23‍–‍33 | 13‍–‍39 |

=== Record vs. opponents ===
1885 National League record Sources:
| Team | BSN | BUF | CHI | DET | NYG | PHI | PRO | SLM |
|---|---|---|---|---|---|---|---|---|
| Boston | — | 10–6 | 2–14 | 7–9 | 3–13 | 7–9 | 9–7 | 8–8–1 |
| Buffalo | 6–10 | — | 0–16 | 11–5 | 1–15 | 5–11 | 3–13 | 12–4 |
| Chicago | 14–2 | 16–0 | — | 15–1 | 6–10 | 11–5 | 11–5 | 14–2–1 |
| Detroit | 9–7 | 5–11 | 1–15 | — | 4–12 | 7–9 | 6–9 | 9–4 |
| New York | 13–3 | 15–1 | 10–6 | 12–4 | — | 11–5 | 12–4 | 12–4 |
| Philadelphia | 9–7 | 11–5 | 5–11 | 9–7 | 5–11 | — | 8–7 | 9–6–1 |
| Providence | 7–9 | 13–3 | 5–11 | 9–6 | 4–12 | 7–8 | — | 8–8 |
| St. Louis | 8–8–1 | 4–12 | 2–14–1 | 4–9 | 4–12 | 6–9–1 | 8–8 | — |

=== Roster ===
1885 Buffalo Bisons
Roster
| Pitchers: John Connor; Pete Conway; John Fischer; Pud Galvin; Billy Serad; Pete Wood; Catchers: Jim McCauley; George Myers; Fred Wood | Infielders: Dan Brouthers; Dennis Driscoll; Davy Force; Gil Hatfield; Moxie Hengel; Jim McDonald; Dick Phelan; Hardy Richardson; Charlie Ritter; Jack Rowe; Dan Stearns; Deacon White | Outfielders: Scrappy Carroll; Ed Crane; Bill Crowley; Buttercup Dickerson; Dave Eggler; Jim Lillie; Joe Stabell | Manager: Jack Chapman; Pud Galvin |

== Player stats ==
=== Batting ===
==== Starters by position ====
Note: Pos = Position; G = Games played; AB = At bats; H = Hits; Avg. = Batting average; HR = Home runs; RBI = Runs batted in

| Pos | Player | G | AB | H | Avg. | HR | RBI |
|---|---|---|---|---|---|---|---|
| C | George Myers | 89 | 326 | 67 | .206 | 0 | 19 |
| 1B | Dan Brouthers | 98 | 407 | 146 | .359 | 7 | 59 |
| 2B | Davy Force | 71 | 253 | 57 | .225 | 0 | 15 |
| SS | Jack Rowe | 98 | 421 | 122 | .290 | 2 | 51 |
| 3B | Deacon White | 98 | 404 | 118 | .292 | 0 | 57 |
| OF | Bill Crowley | 92 | 344 | 83 | .241 | 1 | 36 |
| OF | Jim Lillie | 112 | 430 | 107 | .249 | 2 | 30 |
| OF | Hardy Richardson | 96 | 426 | 136 | .319 | 6 | 44 |

==== Other batters ====
Note: G = Games played; AB = At bats; H = Hits; Avg. = Batting average; HR = Home runs; RBI = Runs batted in

| Player | G | AB | H | Avg. | HR | RBI |
|---|---|---|---|---|---|---|
| Dan Stearns | 30 | 105 | 21 | .200 | 0 | 9 |
| Jim McCauley | 24 | 84 | 15 | .179 | 0 | 7 |
| Ed Crane | 13 | 51 | 14 | .275 | 2 | 9 |
| Scrappy Carroll | 13 | 40 | 3 | .075 | 0 | 1 |
| Gil Hatfield | 11 | 30 | 4 | .133 | 0 | 0 |
| Moxie Hengel | 7 | 26 | 4 | .154 | 0 | 0 |
| Dave Eggler | 6 | 24 | 2 | .083 | 0 | 0 |
| Joe Stabell | 7 | 22 | 1 | .045 | 0 | 0 |
| Buttercup Dickerson | 5 | 21 | 1 | .048 | 0 | 0 |
| Dennis Driscoll | 7 | 19 | 3 | .158 | 0 | 0 |
| Dick Phelan | 4 | 16 | 2 | .125 | 1 | 3 |
| Jim McDonald | 5 | 14 | 0 | .000 | 0 | 0 |
| Charlie Ritter | 2 | 6 | 1 | .167 | 0 | 0 |
| Fred Wood | 1 | 4 | 1 | .250 | 0 | 0 |

=== Pitching ===
==== Starting pitchers ====
Note: G = Games pitched; IP = Innings pitched; W = Wins; L = Losses; ERA = Earned run average; SO = Strikeouts

| Player | G | IP | W | L | ERA | SO |
|---|---|---|---|---|---|---|
| Pud Galvin | 33 | 284.0 | 13 | 19 | 4.09 | 93 |
| Billy Serad | 30 | 241.1 | 7 | 21 | 4.10 | 90 |
| Pete Conway | 27 | 210.0 | 10 | 17 | 4.67 | 94 |
| Pete Wood | 24 | 198.2 | 8 | 15 | 4.44 | 38 |
| John Connor | 1 | 9.0 | 0 | 1 | 4.00 | 0 |
| J. Fisher | 1 | 9.0 | 0 | 1 | 5.00 | 4 |

==== Relief pitchers ====
Note: G = Games pitched; W = Wins; L = Losses; SV = Saves; ERA = Earned run average; SO = Strikeouts

| Player | G | W | L | SV | ERA | SO |
|---|---|---|---|---|---|---|
| Hardy Richardson | 1 | 0 | 0 | 0 | 2.25 | 1 |
