= Triple play =

Making three outs during the same play in baseball

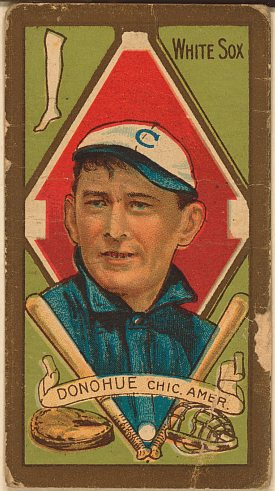
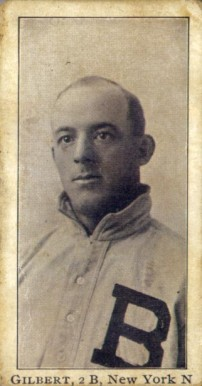
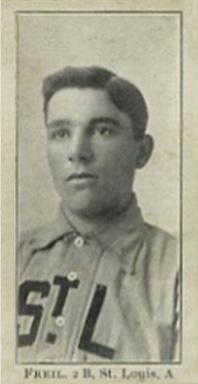
Jiggs Donahue, Billy Gilbert, and Bill Friel (left to right) of the Milwaukee Brewers recorded the first triple play in American League history on July 14, 1901, against the Chicago White Stockings.

In baseball or softball, a triple play (denoted as TP in baseball statistics) is the act of making three outs during the same play. There have only been 741 triple plays in Major League Baseball (MLB) since 1876, an average of just over five per season.

They depend on a combination of two factors, which are themselves uncommon:

- First, there must be at least two baserunners, and no outs. From analysis of all MLB games from 2011 to 2013, only 1.51% of at bats occur in such a scenario. By comparison, 27.06% of at bats occur with at least one baserunner and fewer than two outs, the scenario where a double play is possible.
- Second, activity must occur during the play that enables the defense to make three outs. Common plays, such as the batter striking out or hitting a fly ball, do not normally provide an opportunity for a triple play. A ball hit sharply and directly to an infielder, who then takes very quick or unanticipated action, as well as confusion or mistakes by the baserunners, is usually needed.

In baseball scorekeeping, the abbreviation GITP can be used if the batter grounded into a triple play.

== Examples ==
The most likely scenario for a triple play is no outs with runners on first base and second base, which has been the case for the majority of MLB triple plays. In that context, two examples of triple plays are:

- The batter hits a ground ball to the third baseman, who steps on third base to force out the runner coming from second (first out). The third baseman throws to the second baseman, who steps on second base to force out the runner coming from first (second out). The second baseman throws to the first baseman, with the throw arriving in time to force out the batter (third out). This is an example of grounding into a 5-4-3 triple play, also known as an "around the horn" triple play, per standard baseball positions.

- During the 1973 season, Baltimore Orioles third baseman Brooks Robinson started two such 5-4-3 triple plays: one on July 7 against the Oakland Athletics, and one on September 20 against the Detroit Tigers. As a hitter, he is the all-time MLB leader for grounding into triple plays, with four in his career.
- On July 17, 1990, the Minnesota Twins became the first (and to date, the only) team in MLB history to turn two triple plays in the same game. Both were 5-4-3 triple plays, executed by fielders Gary Gaetti, Al Newman, and Kent Hrbek in a game against the Boston Red Sox.

- The baserunners start running in an attempt to steal or execute a hit and run play, and the batter hits a line drive to the second baseman, who catches it (first out). The second baseman throws to the shortstop, who steps on second base before the runner who started there can tag up (second out). The shortstop throws to the first baseman, who steps on first base before the runner who started there can tag up (third out). This is an example of lining out into a 4-6-3 triple play. Some triple plays can involve only two players. For example, if the pitcher catches a line drive (first out) then throws to the shortstop who steps on second base for a runner who fails to tag up (second out) and tags the runner from first before that runner can return to first (third out). This is a 1-6 triple play; similarly, instead of the shortstop, the play might involve the second baseman tagging second (second out) and the runner (third out), resulting in a 1-4 triple play. Note that, in either situation, the second and third outs can be reversed, e.g. the runner from first is tagged (second out), followed by second base being tagged (third out). A triple play can also involve only one defensive player. This is an unassisted triple play, described below.

=== Most recent MLB triple play ===
The most recent triple play in MLB was turned by the Miami Marlins on July 21, 2026, against the Houston Astros. With runners on first and second in the bottom of the eighth inning, Jose Altuve hit a hard ground ball to third baseman Leo Jiménez, who stepped on third and tossed to second, where second baseman Xavier Edwards stepped on the bag and quickly threw to first baseman Kyle Stowers in time to retire a sprinting Altuve. The play came on a losing effort, as the Marlins ultimately lost, 5–3, to the Astros.

== Unassisted triple plays ==
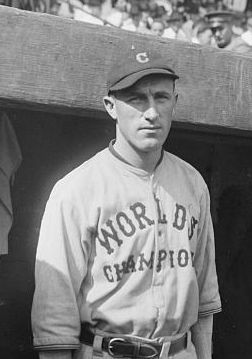
Bill Wambsganss executed an unassisted triple play in the 1920 World Series.

The rarest type of triple play, and one of the rarest events of any kind in baseball, is for a single fielder to complete all three outs in one play. There have only been 15 unassisted triple plays in MLB history, making this feat rarer than a perfect game.

Typically, an unassisted triple play is achieved when a middle infielder catches a line drive near second base (first out), steps on the base before the runner who started there can tag up (second out), and then tags the runner advancing from first before he can return there (third out). Of the 15 unassisted triple plays in MLB history, 12 have been completed in this manner by a middle infielder.

=== Most recent MLB unassisted triple play ===
The most recent MLB unassisted triple play is consistent with the above – it occurred on August 23, 2009, by second baseman Eric Bruntlett of the Philadelphia Phillies, in a game against the New York Mets. In the bottom of the ninth inning with men on first and second base, the base runners were both running when Jeff Francoeur hit a line drive very close to second base, which Bruntlett was covering. Bruntlett caught the ball (first out), stepped on second base before Luis Castillo could tag up (second out), and then tagged Daniel Murphy who was approaching from first base (third out) to end the game. This was only the second game-ending unassisted triple play in MLB history, the first one having occurred in 1927.

== Unfielded triple play ==
Political columnist and baseball enthusiast George Will posed one hypothetical way that a triple play could occur with no fielder touching the ball. With runners on first and second and no outs, the batter hits an infield fly, and is automatically out: one out. The runner from first passes the runner from second and is called out for that infraction: two outs. Just after that, the falling ball hits the runner from second, who is called out for interference: three outs.

Whenever a batter or runner is out without a fielder touching the ball, MLB rule book section 10.09 provides for automatic putouts to be assigned by the official scorer. In this case, the first out would be credited to whoever the official scorer believes would have had the best chance of catching the infield fly. The second and third outs would be credited to the fielder(s) closest to the points the runners were, when their respective outs occurred. Under the scenario described above, the same fielder (the shortstop, for example) could be credited with all three putouts, thus attaining an unassisted triple play without having touched the ball.

While this has never occurred in a major-league game, Texas League Hall of Famer Keith Bodie told Sporting News that this event occurred in a 1986 spring training game.

== Odd and notable triple plays ==
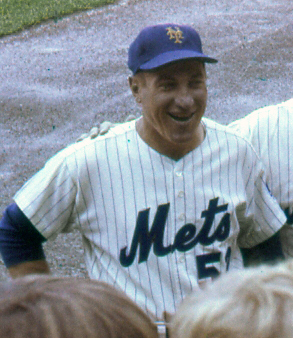
Joe Pignatano hit into a triple play in the final at bat of his career.

- On September 30, 1962, in the eighth inning of the last game of the 1962 Mets' 40–120 season, facing the Chicago Cubs at Wrigley Field, Joe Pignatano popped into a 4-3-6 triple play in his last MLB appearance. It was also the last game for Sammy Drake and Richie Ashburn, the two runners who were tagged out. Pignatano is the only player to end his career by hitting into a triple play.
- The New York Yankees got caught in a bizarre 2-5-3-1 triple play while facing the Minnesota Twins on May 29, 1982. Roy Smalley struck out (first out), while both Yankees baserunners had taken off in an attempted double steal. The ball was thrown to third baseman Gary Gaetti, who chased baserunner Bobby Murcer back to second, where Murcer was safe. Gaetti then threw the ball to first baseman Kent Hrbek to tag baserunner Graig Nettles who was caught between first and second (second out). Meanwhile, Murcer attempted to advance from second to third again. The ball was thrown from Hrbek to third base, where pitcher Terry Felton was covering, and Felton tagged Murcer (third out).
- On August 6, 2001, catcher Scott Hatteberg of the Boston Red Sox lined out into a triple play completed by Texas Rangers shortstop Alex Rodriguez and second baseman Randy Velarde (the latter of whom completed an unassisted triple play the previous season). In his very next at-bat, Hatteberg proceeded to hit a grand slam, making him the only player to go from hitting into the best defensive play in baseball to making the best offensive play in baseball in consecutive at-bats.
- On April 14, 2002, designated hitter Ron Wright of the Seattle Mariners grounded into a triple-play in the fourth inning of the only MLB game of Wright's career (against the Rangers). With runners on first (John Olerud) and third (Ruben Sierra), Wright grounded to pitcher Kenny Rogers who threw to shortstop Alex Rodriguez to force Olerud at second (first out). Sierra, meanwhile, had broken late for home, and Rodriguez fired to catcher Bill Haselman. Haselman threw to third baseman Hank Blalock who threw to Rogers in the rundown; with Rogers tagging out Sierra (second out). Rogers then threw to second baseman Michael Young, who tagged out Wright trying to reach second (third out). The play was scored 1-6-2-5-1-4. (Wright's other plate appearances were a strikeout and grounding into a double play, thus accounted for six outs in three MLB at-bats.)
- In a rare case of a triple play without the batter hitting the ball, a September 2, 2006, game between the Seattle Mariners and the Tampa Bay Devil Rays resulted in three outs instigated from an attempt by the Mariners' Adrián Beltré to steal second base after cleanup hitter Raúl Ibañez struck out against J. P. Howell. The Devil Rays' catcher, Dioner Navarro, saw the attempt and threw the ball to shortstop Ben Zobrist, who tagged Beltré for the second out. Mariners' runner José López, who had been at third base during this play, tried to take advantage of the situation and steal home, only for Zobrist to throw the ball back to Navarro who tagged López out. At the time, the Society for American Baseball Research believed this to be the only 2-6-2 triple play in major-league history.
- On May 19, 2010, in a game between the Washington Nationals and the New York Mets, with runners on first and second for the Nationals in the bottom of the fifth inning, Cristian Guzmán hit a blooper that was caught by Ángel Pagán just before it hit the ground (first out), before throwing the ball into the infield, where catcher Henry Blanco picked it up and threw it to shortstop José Reyes covering second base to force out Liván Hernández, who had advanced to third base (second out), before the ball was thrown to first baseman Ike Davis to force out Nyjer Morgan, who had advanced to second base (third out). The play was scored 8-2-6-3. Had Pagán run with the ball in to second base, he could have completed the first unassisted triple play by an outfielder by stepping on the base to force out Hernández and tagging Morgan out.
- The Yankees also turned one of the more complicated triple plays in MLB history. On April 12, 2013, with runners on first and second in the top of the 8th inning, Baltimore batter Manny Machado hit a sharp one-hopper to Yankees second baseman Robinson Canó. Canó fielded the ball and threw to shortstop Jayson Nix, forcing baserunner Nick Markakis for the first out. Instead of going to first for a routine double play, Nix opted to throw to third baseman Kevin Youkilis, catching baserunner Alexi Casilla between second and third. Youkilis chased Casilla back towards second and threw to Nix, who returned the throw to Youkilis, who tagged Casilla for the second out. Youkilis then threw to first baseman Lyle Overbay, catching Machado in a rundown between first and second. Overbay threw back to Canó, who tagged Machado sliding into second base for the third out. The play was scored 4-6-5-6-5-3-4.
- On May 9, 2015, with runners on second and third in the top of the 2nd inning, St. Louis Cardinals catcher Yadier Molina hit a line drive that was caught by Pittsburgh Pirates second baseman Neil Walker for the first out. Walker then threw to third baseman Jung Ho Kang who stepped on third before Jhonny Peralta could tag up, for the second out. Kang, after a moment's hesitation, then threw back to Walker who stepped on second before Jason Heyward could tag up, for the third out. It was the first 4-5-4 triple play in MLB history.
- On April 22, 2016, in a game between the Texas Rangers and Chicago White Sox, with the bases loaded in the top of the 7th inning, Mitch Moreland of the Rangers hit a line drive to right field that was caught by Adam Eaton for the first out. Eaton threw the ball to first baseman José Abreu, who tagged baserunner Ian Desmond after he overran first base into foul territory while attempting to tag up, for the second out. Abreu then threw the ball to catcher Dioner Navarro at home. Adrián Beltré, the runner on second base, had tagged up earlier in the play and had started advancing to third; however, Prince Fielder, the runner on third base, was still at third. Navarro threw to shortstop Tyler Saladino, making Beltré continue his run towards third, which in turn made Fielder start to run towards home. Fielder was then caught in a rundown; Saladino threw to Navarro, who then threw to third baseman Todd Frazier, who tagged Fielder for the third out. The play was scored 9-3-2-6-2-5.
- On July 29, 2016, in a game between the Washington Nationals and the San Francisco Giants, the Giants loaded the bases with nobody out in the bottom of the 8th inning. Brandon Crawford hit a line drive that was caught by Nationals' first baseman Ryan Zimmerman for the first out. Zimmerman then touched first base before Buster Posey could tag up, for the second out. Zimmerman then threw to third baseman Anthony Rendon, who stepped on third before Denard Span could tag up, for the third out. It was the first 3-3-5 triple play in MLB history.
- On August 16, 2018, in a game between the Los Angeles Angels and the Texas Rangers, the Angels loaded the bases with nobody out in the top of the 4th inning. David Fletcher hit a grounder that was fielded by Rangers' third baseman Jurickson Profar, who had knocked down the ball with his body prior to picking it up. Profar stepped on third base to force out Eric Young Jr. for the first out, then tagged out Taylor Ward at third base (who remained at third believing Profar had caught a line drive) once Ward fell off the bag for the second out, before throwing to second baseman Rougned Odor, who stepped on second to force out Kole Calhoun for the third out, leaving Fletcher stranded at first. The play, scored a 5-5-4 fielder's choice, was the first 5-5-4 triple play of any kind since St. Louis Browns third baseman Owen Friend and second baseman Snuffy Stirnweiss turned the feat in 1950, and the first triple play fielder's choice (to not retire the batter) in the live-ball era of MLB (the most recent previous such triple play was in 1912, when the Brooklyn Dodgers turned the feat against the Cincinnati Reds).
- On June 17, 2021, the New York Yankees turned the first 1-3-6-2-5-6 triple play in major league history, against the Toronto Blue Jays at Sahlen Field in Buffalo, New York. In the bottom of the first inning with first base open, Bo Bichette on second, Marcus Semien on third, and Yankees starter Michael King pitching and facing Vladimir Guerrero Jr. at the plate, Guerrero hit a ground ball to the third base side that was fielded by King. King threw the ball to first baseman DJ LeMahieu for the first out. During that fielding, Bichette had begun to run to third, forcing Semien to proceed to home plate. LeMahieu noticed that both Semien and Bichette were near the third base bag and threw the ball to shortstop Gleyber Torres, who promptly threw the ball to catcher Gary Sanchez, catching Semien in a rundown between third and home. Sanchez chased Semien back to third and threw the ball to third baseman Gio Urshela, who applied the tag to Semien for the second out. Urshela turned around and threw to Torres to tag out Bichette sliding into third for the final out of the inning, which was challenged by the Blue Jays, but stood as a triple play.
- On July 4, 2022, the Minnesota Twins turned the first known 8-5 triple play in MLB history, in a game against the Chicago White Sox. In the bottom of the seventh inning, with Yoán Moncada on first and Adam Engel on second, A. J. Pollock hit a deep fly ball to center, in what apparently would be an extra-base hit. However, center fielder Byron Buxton caught the ball, making Pollock the first out, while both Moncada and Engel attempted to advance without tagging up. Buxton threw the ball in to third basemen Gio Urshela between second and third. Urshela tagged out Moncada, who had already advanced past second and was attempting to return, for the second out, then stepped on second base to make Engel, who had advanced to third base, the final out.
- On June 25, 2024, the Philadelphia Phillies turned a triple play in the third inning of their 8–1 win over the Detroit Tigers at Comerica Park, which marked the first successful triple play of the 2024 season, the first triple play the Phillies had turned since 2017, and the first 1-3-5 triple play in the major leagues since 1929.
- On September 24, 2024, the San Diego Padres turned a 5-4-3 triple play in the bottom of the ninth inning to end the ballgame, securing a 4–2 win over the Los Angeles Dodgers at Dodger Stadium. This was the first instance in major-league history of a team executing a game-ending triple play whilst clinching a postseason berth.
- On April 25, 2025, Mets hitter Jesse Winker hit a line drive that appeared to be caught by Nationals first baseman Nathaniel Lowe, who threw to shortstop CJ Abrams for the second out, and then Abrams threw to Lowe at first base to complete the triple play, which was initially ruled as a 3-6-3 triple play but changed to a 3-6 triple play. Replays showed that the line drive actually hit the ground before settling in Lowe's glove, but instant replay in Major League Baseball cannot be used on line drives in the infield, so the play stood as ruled as a triple play.

== Historical totals ==
The statistics below reflect historical totals through July 21, 2026.

=== Baserunners ===
Position of baserunners when the triple play started.

Men on base	Occurrences	Percentage	Most recent
1 2 -	501	67.61	21-Jul-2026
1 2 3	130	17.54	29-Jul-2020
1 - 3	72	9.72	24-Jun-2024
2 3	37	4.99	17-Jun-2021
1 2 ?	1	0.13	11-Jun-1885†
Total	741	100	

† This triple play, by the New York Giants against the Providence Grays during the 1885 season, was scored as 4*-4*-3*, with a newspaper account the next day naming the fielders, batter, and runners at first and second; however, it is unknown if there was a runner at third base.

=== Outs ===

Asterisks (*) denote which players recorded outs, per standard baseball positions.
Combinations that have occurred at least 10 times are listed individually.

Fielders	Occurrences	Percentage	Most recent
5*-4*-3*	108	14.57	21-Jul-2026
6*-4*-3*	58	7.83	18-Sep-2022
4*-6*-3*	44	5.94	06-Jun-2014
3*-3*-6*	42	5.67	25-Apr-2025
6*-6*-3*	29	3.91	12-Aug-2025
4*-4*-3*	22	2.97	02-May-2017
4*-3*-6*	18	2.43	03-May-1985
1*-6*-3*	16	2.16	19-May-1997
6-4*-3*-2*	14	1.89	18-Aug-2023
5*-5*-3*	11	1.48	29-Jul-2020
5-4*-3*-2*	10	1.35	24-Aug-2014
all others	369	49.80	24-Jun-2024
Total	741	100	

== Cultural references ==
On June 27, 1967, the New York Mets and Pittsburgh Pirates staged a triple play before their game at Shea Stadium for the film The Odd Couple. The scene depicts Bill Mazeroski of the Pirates grounding into a game-ending 5-4-3 triple play. Mazeroski, who played 17 major league seasons, was involved in only one actual MLB triple play; he was the runner on second base when the Chicago Cubs turned a 3-3-6 triple play on October 3, 1965.
