= 1885 Boston Beaneaters season =

1885 Boston Beaneaters
- League: National League
- Ballpark: South End Grounds
- City: Boston, Massachusetts
- Record: 46–66 (.411)
- League place: 5th
- Owner: Arthur Soden
- Manager: John Morrill

The 1885 Boston Beaneaters season was the 15th season of the franchise. The team finished in fifth place in the National League with a record of 46–66, 41 games behind the Chicago White Stockings.

== Regular season ==
=== Season standings ===
National League
Team	W	L	Pct.	GB	Home	Road
Chicago White Stockings	87	25	.777	—	42‍–‍14	45‍–‍11
New York Giants	85	27	.759	2	51‍–‍10	34‍–‍17
Philadelphia Quakers	56	54	.509	30	29‍–‍26	27‍–‍28
Providence Grays	53	57	.482	33	31‍–‍20	22‍–‍37
Boston Beaneaters	46	66	.411	41	24‍–‍34	22‍–‍32
Detroit Wolverines	41	67	.380	44	29‍–‍23	12‍–‍44
Buffalo Bisons	38	74	.339	49	19‍–‍34	19‍–‍40
St. Louis Maroons	36	72	.333	49	23‍–‍33	13‍–‍39

=== Record vs. opponents ===
1885 National League record Sources:
Team	BSN	BUF	CHI	DET	NYG	PHI	PRO	SLM
Boston	—	10–6	2–14	7–9	3–13	7–9	9–7	8–8–1
Buffalo	6–10	—	0–16	11–5	1–15	5–11	3–13	12–4
Chicago	14–2	16–0	—	15–1	6–10	11–5	11–5	14–2–1
Detroit	9–7	5–11	1–15	—	4–12	7–9	6–9	9–4
New York	13–3	15–1	10–6	12–4	—	11–5	12–4	12–4
Philadelphia	9–7	11–5	5–11	9–7	5–11	—	8–7	9–6–1
Providence	7–9	13–3	5–11	9–6	4–12	7–8	—	8–8
St. Louis	8–8–1	4–12	2–14–1	4–9	4–12	6–9–1	8–8	—

=== Roster ===
1885 Boston Beaneaters
Roster
Pitchers: Charlie Buffinton; Daisy Davis; Bill Stemmyer; Jim Whitney; Catchers: Pat Dealy; Tom Gunning; Mert Hackett; Pop Tate	Infielders: Jack Burdock; Walter Hackett; John Morrill; Billy Nash; Ezra Sutton; Sam Wise	Outfielders: Bill Collver; Mike Hines; Joe Hornung; Dick Johnston; Jim Manning; Tommy McCarthy; Tom Poorman; Blondie Purcell; Guerdon Whiteley	Manager: John Morrill

== Player stats ==
=== Batting ===
==== Starters by position ====
Note: Pos = Position; G = Games played; AB = At bats; H = Hits; Avg. = Batting average; HR = Home runs; RBI = Runs batted in

Pos	Player	G	AB	H	Avg.	HR	RBI
C	Tom Gunning	48	174	32	.184	0	15
1B	John Morrill	111	438	114	.260	3	61
2B	Jack Burdock	45	169	24	.142	0	7
SS	Sam Wise	107	424	120	.283	4	46
3B	Ezra Sutton	110	457	143	.313	4	47
OF	Jim Manning	84	306	63	.206	2	27
OF	Tommy McCarthy	40	148	27	.182	0	11
OF	Tom Poorman	56	227	54	.238	3	25

==== Other batters ====
Note: G = Games played; AB = At bats; H = Hits; Avg. = Batting average; HR = Home runs; RBI = Runs batted in

Player	G	AB	H	Avg.	HR	RBI
Guerdon Whiteley	33	135	25	.185	1	7
Pat Dealy	35	130	29	.223	1	9
Walter Hackett	35	125	23	.184	0	9
Mert Hackett	34	115	21	.183	0	4
Dick Johnston	26	111	26	.234	1	23
Joe Hornung	25	109	22	.202	1	7
Billy Nash	26	94	24	.255	0	11
Blondie Purcell	21	87	19	.218	0	3
Mike Hines	14	56	13	.232	0	4
Pop Tate	4	13	2	.154	0	2
Bill Collver	1	4	0	.000	0	0

=== Pitching ===
==== Starting pitchers ====
Note: G = Games pitched; IP = Innings pitched; W = Wins; L = Losses; ERA = Earned run average; SO = Strikeouts

Player	G	IP	W	L	ERA	SO
Jim Whitney	51	441.1	18	32	2.98	200
Charlie Buffinton	51	434.1	22	27	2.88	242
Daisy Davis	11	94.1	5	6	4.29	30
Bill Stemmeyer	2	11.0	1	1	0.00	8
