= 1885 Providence Grays season =

1885 Providence Grays
- League: National League
- Ballpark: Messer Street Grounds
- City: Providence, Rhode Island
- Record: 53–57 (.482)
- League place: 4th
- Owner: C. T. Gardner
- Manager: Frank Bancroft

After the team's success in 1884, things went downhill for the 1885 Providence Grays. The team dropped in the standings, finishing 30 games back in fourth place and attendance fell drastically. After the season, the club's directors sold all the remaining players to the Boston Beaneaters and folded the team.

== Regular season ==
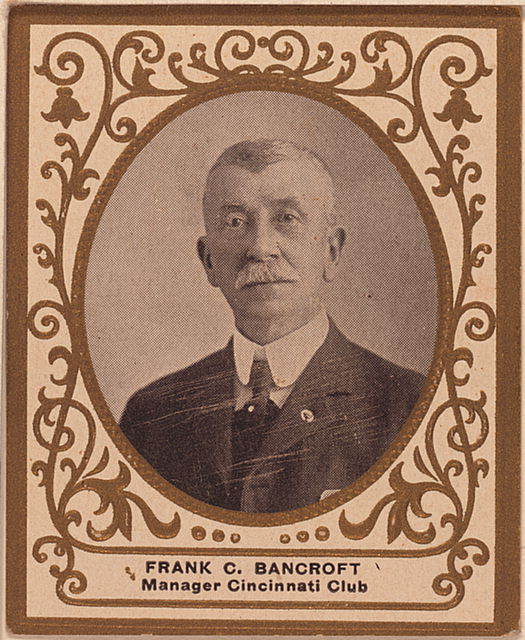
Manager Frank Bancroft

=== Season standings ===
National League
Team	W	L	Pct.	GB	Home	Road
Chicago White Stockings	87	25	.777	—	42‍–‍14	45‍–‍11
New York Giants	85	27	.759	2	51‍–‍10	34‍–‍17
Philadelphia Quakers	56	54	.509	30	29‍–‍26	27‍–‍28
Providence Grays	53	57	.482	33	31‍–‍20	22‍–‍37
Boston Beaneaters	46	66	.411	41	24‍–‍34	22‍–‍32
Detroit Wolverines	41	67	.380	44	29‍–‍23	12‍–‍44
Buffalo Bisons	38	74	.339	49	19‍–‍34	19‍–‍40
St. Louis Maroons	36	72	.333	49	23‍–‍33	13‍–‍39

=== Record vs. opponents ===
1885 National League record Sources:
Team	BSN	BUF	CHI	DET	NYG	PHI	PRO	SLM
Boston	—	10–6	2–14	7–9	3–13	7–9	9–7	8–8–1
Buffalo	6–10	—	0–16	11–5	1–15	5–11	3–13	12–4
Chicago	14–2	16–0	—	15–1	6–10	11–5	11–5	14–2–1
Detroit	9–7	5–11	1–15	—	4–12	7–9	6–9	9–4
New York	13–3	15–1	10–6	12–4	—	11–5	12–4	12–4
Philadelphia	9–7	11–5	5–11	9–7	5–11	—	8–7	9–6–1
Providence	7–9	13–3	5–11	9–6	4–12	7–8	—	8–8
St. Louis	8–8–1	4–12	2–14–1	4–9	4–12	6–9–1	8–8	—

=== Roster ===
1885 Providence Grays
Roster
Pitchers: John Foley; Charlie Hallstrom; Sam Kimber; Jim McCormick; Charles Radbourn; Ed Seward; Dupee Shaw; Edgar Smith; Bill Stellberger; John Ward	Catchers: Con Daily; Barney Gilligan; Mike Hines; Infielders: Wiman Andrus; Charley Bassett; Jerry Denny; Jack Farrell; Arthur Irwin; Denny Lyons; Tim Manning; Joe Start	Outfielders: Cliff Carroll; Ed Crane; Paul Hines; Lon Knight; Paul Radford	Manager: Frank Bancroft

== Player stats ==
=== Batting ===
==== Starters by position ====
Note: Pos = Position; G = Games played; AB = At bats; H = Hits; Avg. = Batting average; HR = Home runs; RBI = Runs batted in

Pos	Player	G	AB	H	Avg.	HR	RBI
C	Barney Gilligan	71	252	54	.214	0	12
1B	Joe Start	101	374	103	.275	0	41
2B	Jack Farrell	68	257	53	.206	1	19
SS	Arthur Irwin	59	218	39	.179	0	14
3B	Jerry Denny	83	318	71	.223	3	24
OF	Paul Radford	105	371	90	.243	0	32
OF	Cliff Carroll	104	426	99	.232	1	40
OF	Paul Hines	98	411	111	.270	1	35

==== Other batters ====
Note: G = Games played; AB = At bats; H = Hits; Avg. = Batting average; HR = Home runs; RBI = Runs batted in

Player	G	AB	H	Avg.	HR	RBI
Charley Bassett	82	285	41	.144	0	16
Con Daily	60	223	58	.260	0	19
Lon Knight	25	81	13	.160	0	8
Tim Manning	10	35	2	.057	0	0
Denny Lyons	4	16	2	.125	0	1
Wyman Andrus	1	4	0	.000	0	0
Mike Hines	1	3	0	.000	0	0
Ed Crane	1	2	0	.000	0	0

=== Pitching ===
==== Starting pitchers ====
Note: G = Games pitched; IP = Innings pitched; W = Wins; L = Losses; ERA = Earned run average; SO = Strikeouts

Player	G	IP	W	L	ERA	SO
Charles Radbourn	49	445.2	28	21	2.20	154
Dupee Shaw	49	399.2	23	26	2.57	194
Jim McCormick	4	37.0	1	3	2.43	8
Edgar Smith	1	9.0	1	0	1.00	1
Charlie Hallstrom	1	9.0	0	1	11.00	0
John Ward	1	8.0	0	1	4.50	3
Sam Kimber	1	8.0	0	1	11.25	4
John Foley	1	8.0	0	1	4.50	2
Bill Stellberger	1	8.0	0	1	7.88	0

==== Other pitchers ====
Note: G = Games pitched; IP = Innings pitched; W = Wins; L = Losses; ERA = Earned run average; SO = Strikeouts

Player	G	IP	W	L	ERA	SO
Paul Radford	3	18.1	0	2	7.85	3

==== Relief pitchers ====
Note: G = Games pitched; W = Wins; L = Losses; SV = Saves; ERA = Earned run average; SO = Strikeouts

Player	G	W	L	SV	ERA	SO
Ed Seward	1	0	0	0	0.00	1
Lon Knight	1	0	0	0	6.75	1
