= John Ward (pitcher) =

American baseball player (1862–1899)

- Pitcher
- Born: 1862; East St. Louis, Illinois, U.S.
- Died: August 2, 1899 (aged 36–37); East St. Louis, Illinois, U.S.
- Batted: Unknown Threw: Unknown

MLB debut
- September 19, 1885, for the Providence Grays

Last MLB appearance
- September 19, 1885, for the Providence Grays

MLB statistics
- Win–loss record: 0–1
- Earned run average: 4.50
- Innings pitched: 8
- Stats at Baseball Reference

Teams
- Providence Grays (1885)

John T. Ward (1862 – August 2, 1899) was an American baseball pitcher.

Born in 1862 at East St. Louis, Illinois, Ward was a stockyard worker and played for the independent Bellville Nationals, where he had a "splendid record" at pitcher. He played one game in Major League Baseball for the 1885 Providence Grays on September 19 of that year. Ward's appearance resulted from a sore arm to the scheduled Providence pitcher, Dupee Shaw. The game was played in St. Louis, and Ward, a local man, was given a trial. Ward pitched a complete game, giving up seven runs (only two of which were earned), 10 hits, one base on balls, and 13 total bases. When he struck out two batters in the fifth inning, a contingent in the crowd from East St. Louis applauded vigorously. The St. Louis Globe-Democrat described his pitching as "very steady" and noted that his pitching was "better than the support", as the team gave up five unearned runs.

Ward returned to the Nationals in 1886. By 1895, although retired by that time, he was still known locally as "the old favorite pitcher of the old Nationals."

Ward later worked for several years as the head office man at Cassidy Brothers, a livestock company in Kansas City, Missouri. He was married to Nellie Sullivan, and they had one child. He contracted consumption and died from that disease in 1899 at age 37 at his father-in-law's home in East St. Louis.
