= List of Buffalo Bisons managers =

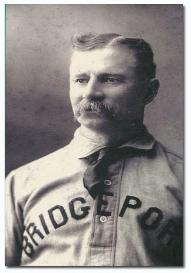
The Bisons' longest-running manager, Jim O'Rourke

The Buffalo Bisons were a Major League Baseball team that was based in Buffalo, New York. They played in the National League from 1879 through 1885. During their time as a Major League team, the Bisons employed five different managers. The duties of the team manager include team strategy and leadership on and off the field.

== Table key ==
#	A running total of the number of Metropolitans' managers. Any manager who has two or more separate terms is only counted once.
G	Number of regular season games managed; may not equal sum of wins and losses due to tie games
W	Number of regular season wins in games managed
L	Number of regular season losses in games managed
WPct	Winning percentage: number of wins divided by number of games managed
PA	Playoff appearances: number of years this manager has led the franchise to the playoffs
PW	Playoff wins: number of wins this manager has accrued in the playoffs
PL	Playoff losses: number of losses this manager has accrued in the playoffs
LC	League Championships: number of League Championships, or pennants, achieved by the manager
WS	World Series: number of World Series victories achieved by the manager

== Managers ==
#	Image	Manager	Seasons	G	W	L	WPct	PA	PW	PL	LC	WS	Ref
1		John Clapp	1879	79	46	32	.590	—	—	—	—	—	
2		Sam Crane	1880	84	24	58	.293	—	—	—	—	—	
3		Jim O'Rourke	1881–1884	380	206	169	.549	—	—	—	—	—	
4		Pud Galvin	1885	24	7	17	.292	—	—	—	—	—	
5		Jack Chapman	1885	88	31	57	.352	—	—	—	—	—	
