= 1885 Chicago White Stockings season =

Major League Baseball season

1885 Chicago White Stockings
- National League champions
- League: National League
- Ballpark: West Side Park
- City: Chicago
- Record: 87–25 (.777)
- League place: 1st
- Owner: Albert Spalding
- Manager: Cap Anson

The 1885 Chicago White Stockings season was the 14th season of the Chicago White Stockings franchise, the tenth in the National League and the first at the first West Side Park. The White Stockings won the National League pennant for the first time since 1882, beating the New York Giants by two games. They went on to face the St. Louis Browns in the 1885 World Series. The series ended without a champion, with both teams winning three games with one tie.

== Regular season ==
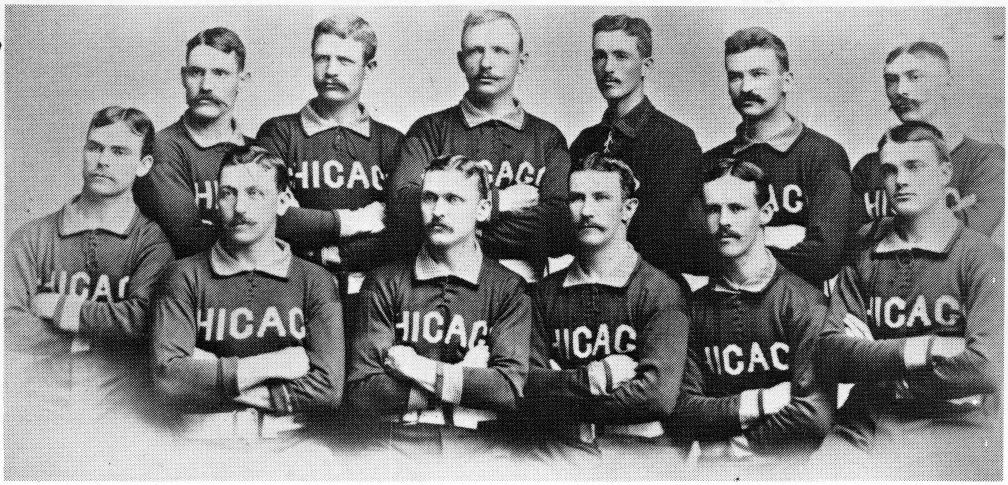
Members of the 1885 Chicago White Stockings

=== Season standings ===
National League
Team	W	L	Pct.	GB	Home	Road
Chicago White Stockings	87	25	.777	—	42‍–‍14	45‍–‍11
New York Giants	85	27	.759	2	51‍–‍10	34‍–‍17
Philadelphia Quakers	56	54	.509	30	29‍–‍26	27‍–‍28
Providence Grays	53	57	.482	33	31‍–‍20	22‍–‍37
Boston Beaneaters	46	66	.411	41	24‍–‍34	22‍–‍32
Detroit Wolverines	41	67	.380	44	29‍–‍23	12‍–‍44
Buffalo Bisons	38	74	.339	49	19‍–‍34	19‍–‍40
St. Louis Maroons	36	72	.333	49	23‍–‍33	13‍–‍39

=== Record vs. opponents ===
1885 National League record Sources:
Team	BSN	BUF	CHI	DET	NYG	PHI	PRO	SLM
Boston	—	10–6	2–14	7–9	3–13	7–9	9–7	8–8–1
Buffalo	6–10	—	0–16	11–5	1–15	5–11	3–13	12–4
Chicago	14–2	16–0	—	15–1	6–10	11–5	11–5	14–2–1
Detroit	9–7	5–11	1–15	—	4–12	7–9	6–9	9–4
New York	13–3	15–1	10–6	12–4	—	11–5	12–4	12–4
Philadelphia	9–7	11–5	5–11	9–7	5–11	—	8–7	9–6–1
Providence	7–9	13–3	5–11	9–6	4–12	7–8	—	8–8
St. Louis	8–8–1	4–12	2–14–1	4–9	4–12	6–9–1	8–8	—

== Roster ==
1885 Chicago White Stockings
Roster
Pitchers: John Clarkson; Larry Corcoran; Ted Kennedy; Jim McCormick	Catchers: Silver Flint; Ed Gastfield; Jim McCauley; Sy Sutcliffe; Infielders: Cap Anson; Tom Burns; Fred Pfeffer; Jimmy Ryan; Ned Williamson	Outfielders: Abner Dalrymple; George Gore; King Kelly; Bill Krieg; Billy Sunday; Wash Williams	Manager: Cap Anson

== Player stats ==
=== Batting ===
==== Starters by position ====
Note: Pos = Position; G = Games played; AB = At bats; H = Hits; Avg. = Batting average; HR = Home runs; RBI = Runs batted in

Pos	Player	G	AB	H	Avg.	HR	RBI
C	Silver Flint	68	249	52	.209	1	17
1B	Cap Anson	112	464	144	.310	7	108
2B	Fred Pfeffer	112	469	113	.241	5	73
SS	Tom Burns	111	445	121	.272	7	71
3B	Ned Williamson	113	407	97	.238	3	65
OF	Abner Dalrymple	113	492	135	.274	11	61
OF	George Gore	109	441	138	.313	5	57
OF	King Kelly	107	438	126	.288	9	75

==== Other batters ====
Note: G = Games played; AB = At bats; H = Hits; Avg. = Batting average; HR = Home runs; RBI = Runs batted in

Player	G	AB	H	Avg.	HR	RBI
Billy Sunday	46	172	44	.256	2	20
Sy Sutcliffe	11	43	8	.186	0	4
Jimmy Ryan	3	13	6	.462	0	2
Jim McCauley	3	6	1	.167	0	0
Wash Williams	1	4	1	.250	0	0
Ed Gastfield	1	3	0	.000	0	0
Bill Krieg	1	3	0	.000	0	0

=== Pitching ===
==== Starting pitchers ====
Note: G = Games pitched; IP = Innings pitched; W = Wins; L = Losses; ERA = Earned run average; SO = Strikeouts

Player	G	IP	W	L	ERA	SO
John Clarkson	70	623.0	53	16	1.85	308
Jim McCormick	24	215.0	20	4	2.43	88
Ted Kennedy	9	78.2	7	2	3.43	36
Larry Corcoran	7	59.1	5	2	3.64	10
Wash Williams	1	2.0	0	0	13.50	0

==== Other pitchers ====
Note: G = Games pitched; IP = Innings pitched; W = Wins; L = Losses; ERA = Earned run average; SO = Strikeouts

Player	G	IP	W	L	ERA	SO
Fred Pfeffer	5	31.2	2	1	2.56	13

==== Relief pitchers ====
Note: G = Games pitched; W = Wins; L = Losses; SV = Saves; ERA = Earned run average; SO = Strikeouts

Player	G	W	L	SV	ERA	SO
Ned Williamson	2	0	0	2	0.00	3

== 1885 World Series ==
The White Stockings tied the St. Louis Browns in the World Series 3–3–1.

- Game 1 (October 14): Darkness ends game one after 8 innings‚ with the teams tied 5–5.
- Game 2 (October 15): With Chicago leading 5–4 in the sixth inning, Browns manager Charles Comiskey calls his team off the field to protest a ruling made by umpire Dave Sullivan. The game is forfeited to Chicago.
- Game 6 (October 23): The series moves from Pittsburgh to Cincinnati‚ setting a record for the series played in the most cities. (It was also played in New York and St. Louis.) Chicago takes a 3–2 series lead by beating the Browns 9–2.
- Game 7 (October 24): Behind pitcher Dave Foutz, St. Louis defeats Chicago 13–4 in the 7th and last game. The Browns claim the game 2 forfeit didn't count and therefore claim the championship. The two clubs split the $1000 prize.
