= 1885 Philadelphia Quakers season =

National League season

1885 Philadelphia Quakers
- League: National League
- Ballpark: Recreation Park
- City: Philadelphia
- Record: 56–54 (.509)
- League place: 3rd
- Owners: Al Reach, John Rogers
- Manager: Harry Wright

The 1885 Philadelphia Quakers season was a season in American baseball. The team finished with a record of 56–54, a distant third place in the National League, 30 games behind the Chicago White Stockings.

== Regular season ==
On June 1, 1885, nearly 10,000 fans filled the Phillies' Recreation Park to see the Phillies face the New York Giants, with fans crowded down the right and left field foul lines.

=== Season standings ===
National League
Team	W	L	Pct.	GB	Home	Road
Chicago White Stockings	87	25	.777	—	42‍–‍14	45‍–‍11
New York Giants	85	27	.759	2	51‍–‍10	34‍–‍17
Philadelphia Quakers	56	54	.509	30	29‍–‍26	27‍–‍28
Providence Grays	53	57	.482	33	31‍–‍20	22‍–‍37
Boston Beaneaters	46	66	.411	41	24‍–‍34	22‍–‍32
Detroit Wolverines	41	67	.380	44	29‍–‍23	12‍–‍44
Buffalo Bisons	38	74	.339	49	19‍–‍34	19‍–‍40
St. Louis Maroons	36	72	.333	49	23‍–‍33	13‍–‍39

=== Record vs. opponents ===
1885 National League record Sources:
Team	BSN	BUF	CHI	DET	NYG	PHI	PRO	SLM
Boston	—	10–6	2–14	7–9	3–13	7–9	9–7	8–8–1
Buffalo	6–10	—	0–16	11–5	1–15	5–11	3–13	12–4
Chicago	14–2	16–0	—	15–1	6–10	11–5	11–5	14–2–1
Detroit	9–7	5–11	1–15	—	4–12	7–9	6–9	9–4
New York	13–3	15–1	10–6	12–4	—	11–5	12–4	12–4
Philadelphia	9–7	11–5	5–11	9–7	5–11	—	8–7	9–6–1
Providence	7–9	13–3	5–11	9–6	4–12	7–8	—	8–8
St. Louis	8–8–1	4–12	2–14–1	4–9	4–12	6–9–1	8–8	—

=== Roster ===
1885 Philadelphia Quakers
Roster
Pitchers: Ed Daily; Charlie Ferguson; The Only Nolan; Bill Vinton	Catchers: Jack Clements; Andy Cusick; Charlie Ganzel; Infielders: Charlie Bastian; Sid Farrar; John Hiland; Joe Mulvey; Al Myers	Outfielders: Ed Andrews; Jim Fogarty; Tom Lynch; Jack Manning	Manager: Harry Wright

== Player stats ==
=== Batting ===
==== Starters by position ====
Note: Pos = Position; G = Games played; AB = At bats; H = Hits; Avg. = Batting average; HR = Home runs; RBI = Runs batted in

Pos	Player	G	AB	H	Avg.	HR	RBI
C	Jack Clements	52	188	36	.191	1	14
1B	Sid Farrar	111	420	103	.245	3	36
2B	Al Myers	93	357	73	.204	1	28
SS	Charlie Bastian	103	389	65	.167	4	29
3B	Joe Mulvey	107	443	119	.269	6	64
OF	Jack Manning	107	445	114	.256	3	40
OF	Jim Fogarty	111	427	99	.232	0	39
OF	Ed Andrews	103	421	112	.266	0	23

==== Other batters ====
Note: G = Games played; AB = At bats; H = Hits; Avg. = Batting average; HR = Home runs; RBI = Runs batted in

Player	G	AB	H	Avg.	HR	RBI
Jack Clements	52	188	36	.191	1	14
Charlie Ganzel	34	125	21	.168	0	6
Tom Lynch	13	53	10	.189	0	1
John Hiland	3	9	0	.000	0	0

=== Pitching ===
==== Starting pitchers ====
Note: G = Games pitched; IP = Innings pitched; W = Wins; L = Losses; ERA = Earned run average; SO = Strikeouts

Player	G	IP	W	L	ERA	SO
Ed Daily	50	440.0	26	23	2.21	140
Charlie Ferguson	48	405.0	26	20	2.22	197
Bill Vinton	9	77.0	3	6	3.04	21
The Only Nolan	7	54.0	1	5	4.17	20
