= Wyman Andrus =

Canadian baseball player (1858–1935)

- Third baseman
- Born: October 14, 1858; Orono, Ontario, Canada
- Died: June 17, 1935 (aged 76); Miles City, Montana, U.S.
- Batted: Unknown Threw: Unknown

MLB debut
- September 15, 1885, for the Providence Grays

Last MLB appearance
- September 15, 1885, for the Providence Grays

MLB statistics
- Batting average: .000
- Home runs: 0
- Runs batted in: 0
- Stats at Baseball Reference

Teams
- Providence Grays (1885)

William Wiman Andrus, also spelled Wyman, (October 14, 1858 – June 17, 1935), was a Canadian professional baseball player who played one game for the 1885 Providence Grays, in his only appearance in Major League Baseball. The game took place on September 15, with Andrus playing third base. He collected no hits in four at bats with one strikeout. He is interred at Custer County Cemetery in Miles City, Montana.
