= Bill Vinton =

American baseball player (1865–1893)

- Pitcher
- Born: April 27, 1865; Winthrop, Massachusetts, U.S.
- Died: September 3, 1893 (aged 28); Pawtucket, Rhode Island, U.S.
- Batted: Right Threw: Right

MLB debut
- July 3, 1884, for the Philadelphia Quakers

Last MLB appearance
- September 16, 1885, for the Philadelphia Athletics

MLB statistics
- Win–loss record: 17-19
- Earned run average: 2.46
- Strikeouts: 160
- Stats at Baseball Reference

Teams
- Philadelphia Quakers (1884–1885); Philadelphia Athletics (1885)

William Miller Vinton (April 27, 1865 – September 3, 1893) was an American pitcher in Major League Baseball.

Vinton was the star pitcher and captain of the Andover baseball team in the early 1880s. He then attended Yale University and played ball there before turning professional.

In 1884, Vinton joined the National League's Philadelphia Quakers. He was the team's best pitcher, posting a 10-10 record with a 2.23 earned run average. Vinton started off slow in 1885 and finished off that season with the Philadelphia Athletics. His career major league record was 17-19.

Vinton returned to Yale and graduated in 1888. He then pitched for the New England League's Lowell Chippies and went 2-0 with a 1.50 ERA. The following season, he went to the Minneapolis Millers.

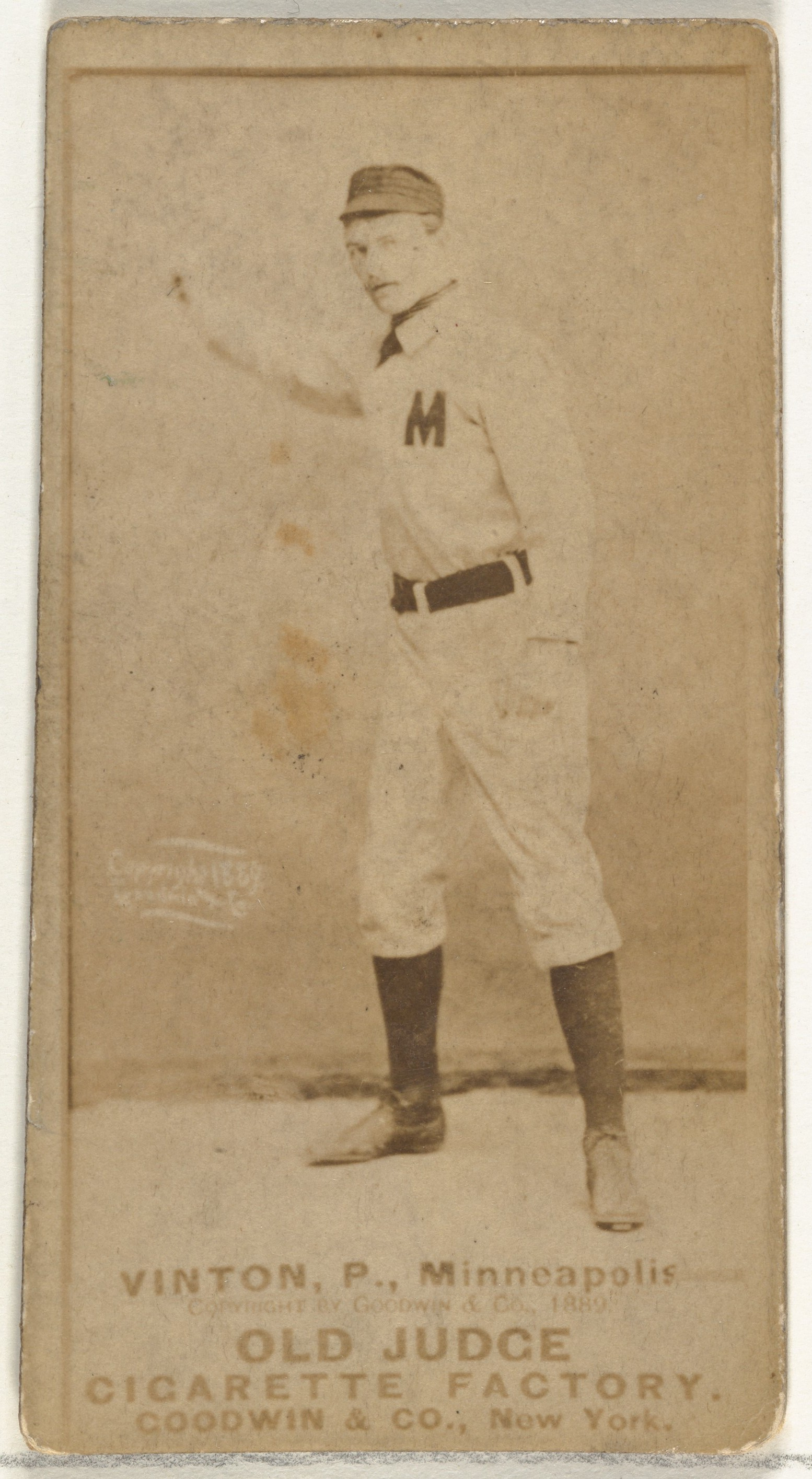
William Miller "Bill" Vinton, 1889

Vinton died in 1893, at the age of 28 from Cholera.
