= Charlie Hallstrom =

American baseball player (1863–1949)

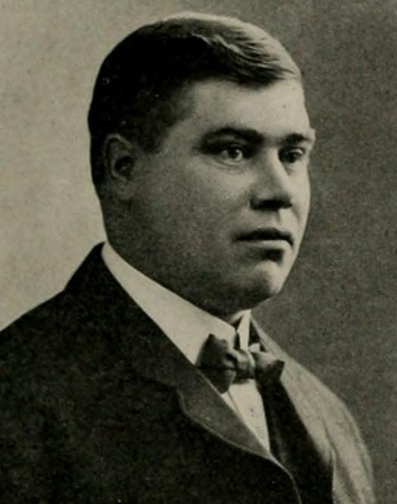
- Pitcher
- Born: January 22, 1863; Jönköping, Sweden
- Died: May 6, 1949 (aged 86); Chicago, United States
- Batted: Unknown Threw: Unknown

Major league debut
- September 23, 1885, for the Providence Grays

Last major league appearance
- September 23, 1885, for the Providence Grays

Major league statistics
- Win–loss record: 0–1
- Earned run average: 11.00
- Strikeouts: 2
- Stats at Baseball Reference

Teams
- Providence Grays (1885)

Charles Emil Hallstrom (January 22, 1863 – May 6, 1949), nicknamed the "Swedish Wonder", was an American and professional baseball pitcher who played one major league game, for the 1885 Providence Grays of the National League. The Grays were in need of a pitcher for that day's game versus the Chicago White Stockings, and used Hallstrom, a local Chicago amateur player. After his playing career, Hallstrom worked as a tailor, and was also a director for an oil company in Indiana. In 1899, he was elected alderman for the 15th ward in Chicago. Hallstrom was the first of five major league baseball players born in Sweden. He was born in Jönköping, Sweden, and died in Chicago at the age of 86. He is interred at the All Saints Cemetery in Des Plaines, Illinois.
