= John Hiland =

American baseball player (1860–1901)

- Second baseman
- Born: September 1860; Baltic, Connecticut, U.S.
- Died: April 10, 1901 (aged 40); Philadelphia, Pennsylvania, U.S.
- Batted: Left Threw: Left

MLB debut
- August 20, 1885, for the Philadelphia Quakers

Last MLB appearance
- August 22, 1885, for the Philadelphia Quakers

MLB statistics
- Batting average: .000
- Home runs: 0
- Runs batted in: 0
- Stats at Baseball Reference

Teams
- Philadelphia Quakers (1885)

John William Hiland (September 1860 – April 10, 1901) was an American Major League Baseball second baseman from Baltic, Connecticut. He played three games in 1885 with the Philadelphia Quakers, and he did not record a career hit. Hiland died on April 10, 1901, in Philadelphia.
