= Bill Stellberger =

American baseball player (1865–1936)

- Pitcher
- Born: April 22, 1865; Detroit, Michigan, U.S.
- Died: November 9, 1936 (aged 71); Detroit, Michigan, U.S.
- Batted: Left Threw: Left

MLB debut
- October 1, 1885, for the Providence Grays

Last MLB appearance
- October 1, 1885, for the Providence Grays

MLB statistics
- Win–loss record: 0–1
- Earned run average: 7.78
- Strikeouts: 0
- Stats at Baseball Reference

Teams
- Providence Grays (1885)

William F. Stellberger (April 22, 1865 – November 9, 1936) was an American professional baseball player who pitched in one game for the 1885 Providence Grays of the National League. He pitched his only major league game on October 1, a complete game loss to the Detroit Wolverines. Stellberger later played for several minor teams; Bridgeport of the Eastern League, Deluth of the Northwestern League, Greenville, Manistee, and Battle Creek of the Michigan State League, and the New Orleans Pelicans of the Southern Association. He died at the age of 71 in his hometown of Detroit, Michigan, and is interred at Woodmere Cemetery.
