= 1885 Detroit Wolverines season =

1885 Detroit Wolverines
- League: National League
- Ballpark: Recreation Park
- City: Detroit, Michigan
- Record: 41–67 (.380)
- League place: 6th
- Owner: Joseph Marsh
- Managers: Charlie Morton, Bill Watkins

The 1885 Detroit Wolverines finished the season with a 41–67 record, finishing in sixth place in the National League.

== Regular season ==
=== Season standings ===
National League
Team	W	L	Pct.	GB	Home	Road
Chicago White Stockings	87	25	.777	—	42‍–‍14	45‍–‍11
New York Giants	85	27	.759	2	51‍–‍10	34‍–‍17
Philadelphia Quakers	56	54	.509	30	29‍–‍26	27‍–‍28
Providence Grays	53	57	.482	33	31‍–‍20	22‍–‍37
Boston Beaneaters	46	66	.411	41	24‍–‍34	22‍–‍32
Detroit Wolverines	41	67	.380	44	29‍–‍23	12‍–‍44
Buffalo Bisons	38	74	.339	49	19‍–‍34	19‍–‍40
St. Louis Maroons	36	72	.333	49	23‍–‍33	13‍–‍39

=== Record vs. opponents ===
1885 National League record Sources:
Team	BSN	BUF	CHI	DET	NYG	PHI	PRO	SLM
Boston	—	10–6	2–14	7–9	3–13	7–9	9–7	8–8–1
Buffalo	6–10	—	0–16	11–5	1–15	5–11	3–13	12–4
Chicago	14–2	16–0	—	15–1	6–10	11–5	11–5	14–2–1
Detroit	9–7	5–11	1–15	—	4–12	7–9	6–9	9–4
New York	13–3	15–1	10–6	12–4	—	11–5	12–4	12–4
Philadelphia	9–7	11–5	5–11	9–7	5–11	—	8–7	9–6–1
Providence	7–9	13–3	5–11	9–6	4–12	7–8	—	8–8
St. Louis	8–8–1	4–12	2–14–1	4–9	4–12	6–9–1	8–8	—

=== Notable transactions ===
- June 15, 1885: Jim Keenan was purchased by the Wolverines from the Indianapolis Hoosiers.
- June 25, 1885: Milt Scott was purchased from the Wolverines by the Pittsburgh Alleghenys.
- July 1, 1885: Jim Keenan jumped from the Wolverines to the Cincinnati Red Stockings.

=== Roster ===
1885 Detroit Wolverines
Roster
Pitchers: Lady Baldwin; Dan Casey; Charlie Getzien; Stump Weidman; Catchers: Charlie Bennett; Ed Gastfield; Deacon McGuire; Jerry Moore; Frank Ringo	Infielders: George Bryant; Chub Collins; Sam Crane; Jim Donnelly; Jim Halpin; Nate Kellogg; Jim Manning; Mox McQuery; Charlie Morton; Frank Olin; Marr Phillips; Joe Quest; Milt Scott	Outfielders: Jerry Dorgan; Ned Hanlon; Frank Meinke; Gene Moriarty; Sam Thompson; George Wood	Manager: Charlie Morton; Bill Watkins

== Player stats ==
=== Batting ===
==== Starters by position ====
Note: Pos = Position; G = Games played; AB = At bats; H = Hits; Avg. = Batting average; HR = Home runs; RBI = Runs batted in

Pos	Player	G	AB	H	Avg.	HR	RBI
C	Charlie Bennett	91	349	94	.269	5	60
1B	Mox McQuery	70	278	76	.273	3	30
2B	Sam Crane	68	245	47	.192	1	20
SS	Marr Phillips	33	139	29	.209	0	17
3B	Jim Donnelly	56	211	49	.232	1	22
OF	Sam Thompson	63	254	77	.303	7	44
OF	Ned Hanlon	105	424	128	.302	1	29
OF	George Wood	82	362	105	.290	5	28

==== Other batters ====
Note: G = Games played; AB = At bats; H = Hits; Avg. = Batting average; HR = Home runs; RBI = Runs batted in

Player	G	AB	H	Avg.	HR	RBI
Joe Quest	55	200	39	.195	0	21
Jerry Dorgan	39	161	46	.286	0	24
Milt Scott	38	148	39	.264	0	12
Deacon McGuire	34	121	23	.190	0	9
Charlie Morton	22	79	14	.177	0	3
Jim Manning	20	78	21	.269	1	9
Frank Ringo	17	65	16	.246	0	2
Chub Collins	14	55	10	.182	0	6
Jim Halpin	15	54	7	.130	0	1
Gene Moriarty	11	39	1	.026	0	0
Jerry Moore	6	23	4	.174	0	0
Nate Kellogg	5	17	2	.118	0	0
Frank Olin	1	4	2	.500	0	0
George Bryant	1	4	0	.000	0	1
Ed Gastfield	1	3	0	.000	0	0

=== Pitching ===
==== Starting pitchers ====
Note: G = Games pitched; IP = Innings pitched; W = Wins; L = Losses; ERA = Earned run average; SO = Strikeouts

Player	G	IP	W	L	ERA	SO
Stump Weidman	38	330.0	14	24	3.14	149
Charlie Getzien	37	330.0	12	25	3.03	110
Lady Baldwin	21	179.1	11	9	1.86	135
Dan Casey	12	104.0	4	8	3.29	79
Frank Meinke	1	5.0	0	1	3.60	0

==== Relief pitchers ====
Note: G = Games pitched; W = Wins; L = Losses; SV = Saves; ERA = Earned run average; SO = Strikeouts

Player	G	W	L	SV	ERA	SO
George Wood	1	0	0	0	0.00	1
Gene Moriarty	1	0	0	0	9.00	1
