= Bill Crowley (baseball) =

American baseball player (1857–1891)

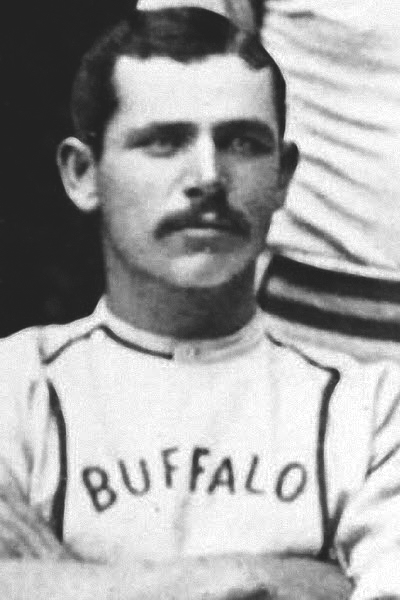
- Outfielder
- Born: April 8, 1857; Philadelphia, Pennsylvania, U.S.
- Died: July 14, 1891 (aged 34); Gloucester, New Jersey, U.S.
- Batted: Right Threw: Right

MLB debut
- April 26, 1875, for the Philadelphia White Stockings

Last MLB appearance
- October 10, 1885, for the Buffalo Bisons

MLB statistics
- Batting average: .263
- Hits: 540
- Runs batted in: 225
- Stats at Baseball Reference

Teams
- Philadelphia White Stockings (1875); Louisville Grays (1877); Buffalo Bisons (1879–1880); Boston Red Caps (1881); Philadelphia Athletics (1883); Cleveland Blues (1883); Boston Beaneaters (1884); Buffalo Bisons (1885)

William Michael Crowley (April 18, 1857 – July 14, 1891) was an American Major League Baseball player who played mainly as an outfielder from 1875 to 1885. He played for the Philadelphia White Stockings, Louisville Grays, Buffalo Bisons, Boston Red Caps/Beaneaters, Philadelphia Athletics, and Cleveland Blues.

Born in Philadelphia to Irish immigrant parents, Crowley worked for a print factory in Gloucester, New Jersey, before beginning his professional baseball career with the Philadelphia White Stockings in 1875. He was the youngest player in the National Association that year, having turned 18 just days before his debut.

Crowley threw out four men from the outfield during a May 1880 game with the Buffalo Bisons, and he did it again in August of that year.

In 1881, Crowley was one of several players blacklisted from the National League by the league president, William Hulbert. The bans were thought to take aim at drunkenness, rowdy behavior and game fixing among the league's players, but all of the blacklisting was lumped under a broad category: "general dissipation and insubordination." Crowley was reinstated in 1883.

On June 7, 1884, while Crowley was playing for the Boston Beaneaters, Providence Grays pitcher Charlie Sweeney struck out Crowley to end the game and to set a single-game major league strikeout record (19 strikeouts). That record was tied several times before Roger Clemens struck out 20 batters in a 1986 game. The rest of the 1884 season was better for Crowley, as he set career highs in games played, at bats, hits and runs batted in.

Crowley's last season in the major leagues was an unpredictable one. He played 92 games for the 1885 Buffalo Bisons, a team that finished with a 38–74 win–loss record. In mid-September, the team was bought out by the Detroit Wolverines. Two days later, four of Crowley's teammates appeared in uniform for the Wolverines, but they did not play after the league threatened the Wolverines with a forfeit. The team's purchase was later reversed by the league. In the last three weeks of the season, the Bisons finished with no wins, sixteen losses and one tie.

From 1886 to 1888, Crowley appeared with four minor league teams before leaving professional baseball. He died at the age of 34 of Bright's disease in Gloucester, New Jersey, and is interred at St. Mary's Cemetery in Bellmawr, New Jersey.
