= 1885 Major League Baseball season =

1885 MLB season
- League: American Association (AA); National League (NL)
- Sport: Baseball
- Duration: Regular season: April 18 – October 5, 1885 (AA); April 30 – October 10, 1885 (NL); World's Championship Series: October 14–24, 1885
- Games: 112
- Teams: 16 (8 per league)

Pennant winner
- AA champions: St. Louis Browns
- AA runners-up: Cincinnati Red Stockings
- NL champions: Chicago White Stockings
- NL runners-up: New York Giants

World's Championship Series
- Venue: American Park, Cincinnati, Ohio; Recreation Park, Pittsburgh, Pennsylvania; Sportsman's Park, St. Louis, Missouri; West Side Park, Chicago, Illinois
- Champions: Series ended in a tie
- Runners-up: St. Louis Browns / Chicago White Stockings

MLB seasons
- ← 1884 1886 →

Locations of teams for the 1885 American Association season
American Association
Locations of teams for the 1885 National League season
National League

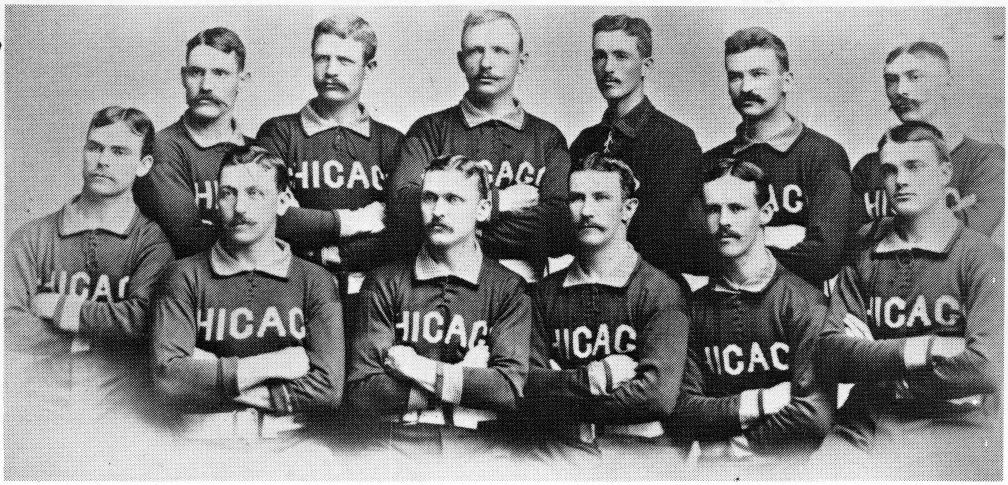
The 1885 Chicago White Stockings (currently 'Chicago Cubs')

The 1885 major league baseball season began on April 18, 1885. The regular season ended on October 15, with the Chicago White Stockings and the St. Louis Browns as regular season champions of the National League and American Association, respectively. The postseason began with Game 1 of the second World's Championship Series on October 14 and ended with Game 7 on October 24, in what was a best-of-seven-playoff. The White Stockings and Browns ended the series in a disputed tie in seven games. This dispute was due to the Browns not considering their forfeit in Game 2 as a voided game, and as a result, claimed victory.

Prior to the 1885 season, the unstable single season Union Association disbanded. The St. Louis Maroons of the Union Association joined the National League, in place of the disbanding Cleveland Blues. The twelve-team American Association would contract down to eight teams, with the Columbus Buckeyes, Indianapolis Hoosiers, and Toledo Blue Stockings folding, while the late-entry Richmond Virginians returned to the Minor Leagues.

The National League's New York Gothams renamed as the New York Giants, and the American Association's Brooklyn Atlantics and Louisville Eclipse renamed as the Brooklyn Grays and Louisville Colonels, respectively.

== Schedule ==
The 1885 schedule consisted of 112 games for all teams in the American Association and National League, each of which had eight teams. Each team was scheduled to play 16 games against the other seven teams of their respective league. This continued the format put in place by the National League since the previous season. The American Association, due to downsizing from a twelve-team league to an eight-team league over the off season, took on this format. This would be the final season for this format, as the AA would implement a 140-game format and the NL a 126-game format the following season.

American Association Opening Day took place on April 18 featuring four teams, while National League Opening Day took place on April 30, with a game between the Chicago White Stockings and St. Louis Maroons. The American Association would see its final day of the regular season on October 5 with a game between the Brooklyn Grays and Philadelphia Athletics, while the National League would see its final day of the season on October 10, featuring four teams. The 1885 World's Championship Series took place between October 14 and October 24, though was originally supposed to extend to October 31.

== Rule changes ==
The 1885 season saw the following rule changes:

- A granulated substance may be applied up to 18" from the bottom of the bat.
- Chest protectors worn by catchers and umpires came into use.
- In the National League, home base could be made of marble or whitened rubber. The American Association would make this change in the following year.
- One portion of the bat could be flat (one side).
- In the National League, the batter's box was extended by one foot in width, on either side of home plate, expanding from three feet wide and one foot from home plate to four feet wide and six inches from home plate. The American Association would follow the following year.
- The balk rule was more clearly defined, changing from "A balk is a motion made by the pitcher to deliver the ball to the bat without delivering it," to "when about to deliver the ball to the bat, while standing within the lines of his position, make any one of the series of motions he habitually makes in so delivering the ball to the bat, without delivering it."
- The American Association abolishes the "foul bound catch" rule, which was when a fielder caught a foul ball on its first bounce. The National League did so previously in 1883.
- Minimum player salary under the reserve rule was made $1,000 (equivalent to $35,833 in 2025).
- On June 7, the American Association lifted all restrictions on pitching, enabling pitchers to throw above the shoulder during pitch delivery. The National League lifted restrictions in 1884.

== Teams ==
League	Team	City	Ballpark	Capacity	Manager
American Association	Baltimore Orioles	Oxford, Maryland	Oriole Park	5,000	Billy Barnie
American Association	Brooklyn Grays	Brooklyn, New York	Washington Park	3,000	Charlie Hackett
American Association	Brooklyn Grays	Brooklyn, New York	Washington Park	3,000	Charlie Byrne
American Association	Cincinnati Red Stockings	Cincinnati, Ohio	American Park	3,000	Ollie Caylor
American Association	Louisville Colonels	Louisville, Kentucky	Eclipse Park	5,860	Jim Hart
American Association	New York Metropolitans	New York, New York	Polo Grounds	20,709	Jim Gifford
American Association	Philadelphia Athletics	Philadelphia, Pennsylvania	Jefferson Street Grounds	15,000	Harry Stovey
American Association	Pittsburgh Alleghenys	Allegheny, Pennsylvania	Recreation Park (Pittsburgh)	17,000	Horace Phillips
American Association	St. Louis Browns	St. Louis, Missouri	Sportsman's Park	6,000	Charles Comiskey
National League	Boston Beaneaters	Boston, Massachusetts	South End Grounds	3,000	John Morrill
National League	Buffalo Bisons	Buffalo, New York	Olympic Park	5,000	Pud Galvin
National League	Buffalo Bisons	Buffalo, New York	Olympic Park	5,000	Jack Chapman
National League	Chicago White Stockings	Chicago, Illinois	West Side Park	6,000	Cap Anson
National League	Detroit Wolverines	Detroit, Michigan	Recreation Park (Detroit)	Unknown	Charlie Morton
National League	Detroit Wolverines	Detroit, Michigan	Recreation Park (Detroit)	Unknown	Bill Watkins
National League	New York Giants	New York, New York	Polo Grounds	20,709	Jim Mutrie
National League	Philadelphia Quakers	Philadelphia, Pennsylvania	Recreation Park	6,500	Harry Wright
National League	Providence Grays	Providence, Rhode Island	Messer Street Grounds	6,000	Frank Bancroft
National League	St. Louis Maroons	St. Louis, Missouri	Union Base Ball Park	10,000	Fred Dunlap
National League	St. Louis Maroons	St. Louis, Missouri	Union Base Ball Park	10,000	Alex McKinnon

=== Neutral site games ===
Three teams hosted games at neutral sites, the Buffalo Bisons, Providence Grays, and St. Louis Maroons.

Team	City	Ballpark	Capacity	Games played
Buffalo Bisons	Elmira, New York	Maple Avenue Driving Park	Unknown	2
Buffalo Bisons	Milwaukee, Wisconsin	Wright Street Grounds	5,300	1
Providence Grays	Milwaukee, Wisconsin	Wright Street Grounds	5,300	1
St. Louis Maroons	Indianapolis, Indiana	Seventh Street Park	Unknown	1

1. In today's Baltimore, Maryland.
2. In today's New York, New York.
3. In today's Pittsburgh, Pennsylvania.

== Standings ==
=== American Association ===
American Association
Team	W	L	Pct.	GB	Home	Road
St. Louis Browns	79	33	.705	—	44‍–‍11	35‍–‍22
Cincinnati Red Stockings	63	49	.562	16	35‍–‍21	28‍–‍28
Pittsburgh Alleghenys	56	55	.505	22½	37‍–‍19	19‍–‍36
Philadelphia Athletics	55	57	.491	24	33‍–‍23	22‍–‍34
Brooklyn Grays	53	59	.473	26	35‍–‍22	18‍–‍37
Louisville Colonels	53	59	.473	26	37‍–‍19	16‍–‍40
New York Metropolitans	44	64	.407	33	28‍–‍24	16‍–‍40
Baltimore Orioles	41	68	.376	36½	29‍–‍26	12‍–‍42

=== National League ===
National League
Team	W	L	Pct.	GB	Home	Road
Chicago White Stockings	87	25	.777	—	42‍–‍14	45‍–‍11
New York Giants	85	27	.759	2	51‍–‍10	34‍–‍17
Philadelphia Quakers	56	54	.509	30	29‍–‍26	27‍–‍28
Providence Grays	53	57	.482	33	31‍–‍20	22‍–‍37
Boston Beaneaters	46	66	.411	41	24‍–‍34	22‍–‍32
Detroit Wolverines	41	67	.380	44	29‍–‍23	12‍–‍44
Buffalo Bisons	38	74	.339	49	19‍–‍34	19‍–‍40
St. Louis Maroons	36	72	.333	49	23‍–‍33	13‍–‍39

=== Tie games ===
4 tie games (1 in AA, 3 in NL), which are not factored into winning percentage or games behind (and were often replayed again) occurred throughout the season.

==== American Association ====
The Baltimore Orioles and Philadelphia Athletics had one tie game each.

- August 11, Baltimore Orioles vs. Philadelphia Athletics, tied at 4.

==== National League ====
The St. Louis Maroons had three tie games. The Boston Beaneaters, Chicago White Stockings, and Philadelphia Quakers had one tie game each.

- August 1, Boston Beaneaters vs. St. Louis Maroons, scoreless.
- September 8, St. Louis Maroons vs. Chicago White Stockings, tied at one.
- October 2, St. Louis Maroons vs. Philadelphia Quakers, tied at 3.

== Postseason ==
=== Bracket ===
World's Championship Series
AA	St. Louis Browns	5^{8}	4	7	3	2	2	13^{8}
NL	Chicago White Stockings	5^{8}	5^{6}*	4	2	9^{7}	9	4

*Denotes game that St. Louis forfeited to Chicago

== Managerial changes ==
=== Off-season ===
Team	Former Manager	New Manager
Baltimore Monumentals	Bill Henderson	Team folded
Brooklyn Grays	George Taylor	Charlie Hackett
Buffalo Bisons	Jim O'Rourke	Pud Galvin
Cincinnati Outlaw Reds	Sam Crane	Team folded
Cincinnati Red Stockings	Pop Snyder	Ollie Caylor
Cleveland Blues	Charlie Hackett	Team folded
Columbus Buckeyes	Gus Schmelz	Team folded
Detroit Wolverines	Jack Chapman	Charlie Morton
Indianapolis Hoosiers	Bill Watkins	Team folded
Kansas City Cowboys	Ted Sullivan	Team folded
Louisville Colonels	Mike Walsh	Jim Hart
Milwaukee Brewers	Tom Loftus	Team folded
New York Giants	John Montgomery Ward	Jim Mutrie
New York Metropolitans	Jim Mutrie	Jim Gifford
Philadelphia Athletics	Lon Knight	Harry Stovey
Richmond Virginians	Felix Moses	Team folded
St. Paul Saints	Andrew Thompson	Team folded
Toledo Blue Stockings	Charlie Morton	Team folded
Washington Nationals (AA)	John Bickerton	Team folded
Washington Nationals (UA)	Michael Scanlon	Team folded

=== In-season ===
Team	Former Manager	New Manager
Brooklyn Grays	Charlie Hackett	Charlie Byrne
Buffalo Bisons	Pud Galvin	Jack Chapman
Detroit Wolverines	Charlie Morton	Bill Watkins
St. Louis Maroons	Fred Dunlap	Alex McKinnon

== League leaders ==
=== American Association ===
Hitting leaders
Stat	Player	Total
AVG	Pete Browning (LOU)	.362
OPS	Pete Browning (LOU)	.923
HR	Harry Stovey (PHA)	13
RBI	Frank Fennelly (CIN)	89
R	Harry Stovey (PHA)	130
H	Pete Browning (LOU)	174

Pitching leaders
Stat	Player	Total
W	Bob Caruthers (STL)	40
L	Hardie Henderson (BAL)	35
ERA	Bob Caruthers (STL)	2.07
K	Ed Morris (PIT)	298
IP	Ed Morris (PIT)	581.0
SV	Thomas Burns (BAL)	3
WHIP	Ed Morris (PIT)	0.964

=== National League ===
Hitting leaders
Stat	Player	Total
AVG	Roger Connor (NYG)	.371
OPS	Dan Brouthers (BUF)	.951
HR	Abner Dalrymple (CHI)	11
RBI	Cap Anson (CHI)	108
R	King Kelly (CHI)	124
H	Roger Connor (NYG)	169

Pitching leaders
Stat	Player	Total
W	John Clarkson (CHI)	53
L	Jim Whitney (BSN)	32
ERA	Tim Keefe (NYG)	1.58
K	John Clarkson (CHI)	308
IP	John Clarkson (CHI)	623.0
SV	Fred Pfeffer (CHI); Ed Williamson (CHI)	2
WHIP	Lady Baldwin (DET)	0.920

== Milestones ==
=== Batters ===
==== Cycles ====
- Dave Orr (NYM):
  - Orr hit for his first cycle and first in franchise history, on June 12 against the St. Louis Browns.
- George Wood (DET):
  - Wood hit for his first cycle and first in franchise history, on June 13 against the Chicago White Stockings.
- Henry Larkin (PHA):
  - Larkin hit for his first cycle and second in franchise history, and the first reverse cycle in major league history on June 16 against Pittsburgh Alleghenys.
- Mox McQuery (DET):
  - McQuery hit for his first cycle and second in franchise history, on September 28 against the Providence Grays.

==== Other batting accomplishments ====
- George Strief (PHA):
  - Set a Major League record by hitting four triples in a single game, on June 25 against the Brooklyn Grays.

=== Pitchers ===
==== No-hitters ====
- John Clarkson (CHI):
  - Clarkson threw his first career no-hitter and fourth no-hitter in franchise history, by defeating the Providence Grays 4–0 on July 27.
- Charlie Ferguson (PHI):
  - Ferguson threw his first career no-hitter and first no-hitter in franchise history, by defeating the Providence Grays 1–0 on August 29. Ferguson walked two and struck out eight.

== Venues ==
The Chicago White Stockings leave Lakefront Park (where they played for seven seasons) and move to West Side Park, where they would go on to play for seven seasons, partway through 1891.

For various reasons, three teams would play home games at neutral sites:

- The Buffalo Bisons played a doubleheader on their last day of the season, at Maple Avenue Driving Park in Elmira, New York on October 10.
- The home of the formerly major league Milwaukee Brewers, Wright Street Grounds in Milwaukee, Wisconsin would be the site of two games, both against the nearby Chicago White Stockings. The Buffalo Bisons hosted on September 4, while the Providence Grays hosted on September 25.
- The St. Louis Maroons played at Seventh Street Park in Indianapolis, Indiana (the home of the former Indianapolis Hoosiers) on September 15.

== See also ==
- 1885 in baseball (Events, Births, Deaths)
