= John Foley (baseball) =

American baseball player (born 1857)

- Pitcher
- Born: October 25, 1857; Brattleboro, Vermont, U.S.
- Died: Unknown
- Batted: Unknown Threw: Left

MLB debut
- September 18, 1885, for the Providence Grays

Last MLB appearance
- September 18, 1885, for the Providence Grays

MLB statistics
- Win–loss record: 0–1
- Earned run average: 4.50
- Strikeouts: 2
- Stats at Baseball Reference

Teams
- Providence Grays (1885)

John J. Foley (born October 25, 1857, date of death unknown) was an American Major League Baseball pitcher who played in 1885 with the Providence Grays.

Foley pitched in one game in his career, a complete game loss against the St. Louis Maroons on September 18, 1885.
