= Daisy Davis =

American baseball player (1858–1902)

- Pitcher
- Born: November 28, 1858; Boston, Massachusetts, U.S.
- Died: November 5, 1902 (aged 43); Lynn, Massachusetts, U.S.
- Batted: Unknown Threw: Right

MLB debut
- May 6, 1884, for the St. Louis Browns

Last MLB appearance
- July 29, 1885, for the Boston Beaneaters

MLB statistics
- Win–loss record: 16–21
- Earned run average: 3.78
- Strikeouts: 186
- Stats at Baseball Reference

Teams
- St. Louis Browns (1884); Boston Beaneaters (1884–1885)

John Henry Albert "Daisy" Davis (November 28, 1858 – November 5, 1902) was an American right-handed professional baseball pitcher who played at the major league level in 1884 and 1885 for the St. Louis Browns and Boston Beaneaters.

== Career ==
Born in Boston, Massachusetts, Davis made his big league debut on May 6, 1884, for the Browns. In 25 games with them (24 starts), he went 10–12 with 20 complete games and an ERA of 2.90. His 6.49 strikeouts per nine innings pitched were second in the American Association that year, and 4.09 strikeout to walk ratio was eighth. He then appeared in four games for the Beaneaters, completing all of them but going only 1–3 with a 7.84 ERA. Overall, he went 11–15 with 23 complete games in 29 games (28 starts). He had a 3.57 ERA.

In 1885, he appeared in 11 games, completing 10 of them. He went 5–6 with a 4.29 ERA. He played his final game on July 29. Overall, Davis went 16–21 with a 3.78 ERA in 40 games. He completed 33 of the games he pitched. As a batter, he hit .157 in 140 at-bats, and he had a .826 fielding percentage. Statistically, he is most similar to Stan Yerkes, according to the Similarity Scores at Baseball-Reference.com.

Following his death of consumption at the age of 43, he was interred at Pine Grove Cemetery in Lynn.
