= 1885 St. Louis Maroons season =

1885 St. Louis Maroons
- League: National League
- Ballpark: Sportsman's Park
- City: St. Louis, Missouri
- Record: 36–72 (.333)
- League place: 8th
- Owner: Henry Lucas
- Managers: Fred Dunlap, Alex McKinnon

The 1885 St. Louis Maroons season was the team's first season in the National League after winning the Union Association championship in 1884. This season was not nearly as successful, as the Maroons finished with a 36–72 record, worst in the eight-team league.

== Regular season ==
=== Season standings ===
National League
Team	W	L	Pct.	GB	Home	Road
Chicago White Stockings	87	25	.777	—	42‍–‍14	45‍–‍11
New York Giants	85	27	.759	2	51‍–‍10	34‍–‍17
Philadelphia Quakers	56	54	.509	30	29‍–‍26	27‍–‍28
Providence Grays	53	57	.482	33	31‍–‍20	22‍–‍37
Boston Beaneaters	46	66	.411	41	24‍–‍34	22‍–‍32
Detroit Wolverines	41	67	.380	44	29‍–‍23	12‍–‍44
Buffalo Bisons	38	74	.339	49	19‍–‍34	19‍–‍40
St. Louis Maroons	36	72	.333	49	23‍–‍33	13‍–‍39

=== Record vs. opponents ===
1885 National League record Sources:
Team	BSN	BUF	CHI	DET	NYG	PHI	PRO	SLM
Boston	—	10–6	2–14	7–9	3–13	7–9	9–7	8–8–1
Buffalo	6–10	—	0–16	11–5	1–15	5–11	3–13	12–4
Chicago	14–2	16–0	—	15–1	6–10	11–5	11–5	14–2–1
Detroit	9–7	5–11	1–15	—	4–12	7–9	6–9	9–4
New York	13–3	15–1	10–6	12–4	—	11–5	12–4	12–4
Philadelphia	9–7	11–5	5–11	9–7	5–11	—	8–7	9–6–1
Providence	7–9	13–3	5–11	9–6	4–12	7–8	—	8–8
St. Louis	8–8–1	4–12	2–14–1	4–9	4–12	6–9–1	8–8	—

=== Roster ===
1885 St. Louis Maroons
Roster
Pitchers: Henry Boyle; Hugh Daily; Egyptian Healy; John Kirby; Billy Palmer; Catchers: George Baker; Fatty Briody; Tom Dolan; Charlie Krehmeyer; Sy Sutcliffe	Infielders: Billy Alvord; Ed Caskin; Fred Dunlap; Jack Glasscock; Jack Gleason; Alex McKinnon; Trick McSorley; Dick Phelan	Outfielders: Jack Brennan; Dick Burns; John Fogarty; Fred Lewis; Joe Quinn; Dave Rowe; Emmett Seery; Orator Shafer; Charlie Sweeney; Rooney Sweeney	Manager: Fred Dunlap; Alex McKinnon

== Player stats ==
=== Batting ===
==== Starters by position ====
Note: Pos = Position; G = Games played; AB = At bats; H = Hits; Avg. = Batting average; HR = Home runs; RBI = Runs batted in

Pos	Player	G	AB	H	Avg.	HR	RBI
C	Fatty Briody	62	215	42	.195	1	17
1B	Alex McKinnon	100	411	121	.294	1	44
2B	Fred Dunlap	106	423	114	.270	2	25
3B	Ed Caskin	71	262	47	.179	0	12
SS	Jack Glasscock	111	446	125	.280	1	40
OF	Orator Shafer	69	257	50	.195	0	18
OF	Emmett Seery	59	216	35	.162	1	14
OF	Joe Quinn	97	343	73	.213	0	15

==== Other batters ====
Note: G = Games played; AB = At bats; H = Hits; Avg. = Batting average; HR = Home runs; RBI = Runs batted in

Player	G	AB	H	Avg.	HR	RBI
Charlie Sweeney	71	267	55	.206	0	24
Fred Lewis	45	181	53	.293	1	27
George Baker	38	131	16	.122	0	5
Dave Rowe	16	62	10	.161	0	3
Dick Burns	14	54	12	.222	0	4
Sy Sutcliffe	16	49	6	.122	0	4
Rooney Sweeney	3	11	1	.091	0	0
Jack Brennan	3	10	1	.100	0	1
Tom Dolan	3	9	2	.222	0	0
John Fogarty	2	8	1	.125	0	0
Jack Gleason	2	7	1	.143	0	0
Trick McSorley	2	6	3	.500	0	1
Billy Alvord	2	5	0	.000	0	0
Dick Phelan	2	4	1	.250	0	1
Charlie Krehmeyer	1	3	0	.000	0	0

=== Pitching ===
==== Starting pitchers ====
Note: G = Games pitched; IP = Innings pitched; W = Wins; L = Losses; ERA = Earned run average; SO = Strikeouts

Player	G	IP	W	L	ERA	SO
Henry Boyle	42	366.2	16	24	2.75	133
Charlie Sweeney	35	275.0	11	21	3.93	84
John Kirby	14	129.1	5	8	3.55	46
Hugh Daily	11	91.1	3	8	3.94	31
Egyptian Healy	8	66.0	1	7	3.00	32
Billy Palmer	4	34.0	0	4	3.44	9

==== Relief pitchers ====
Note: G = Games pitched; W = Wins; L = Losses; SV = Saves; ERA = Earned run average; SO = Strikeouts

Player	G	W	L	SV	ERA	SO
Dick Burns	1	0	0	0	9.00	2
