= Charlie Ritter =

American baseball player (1868–1958)

- Second baseman
- Born: October 1868; Buffalo, New York
- Died: December 13, 1958 (aged 90); Fort Myers, Florida
- Batted: Unknown Threw: Unknown

MLB debut
- September 21, 1885, for the Buffalo Bisons

Last MLB appearance
- September 23, 1885, for the Buffalo Bisons

MLB statistics
- Batting average: .167
- Home runs: 0
- Runs batted in: 0
- Stats at Baseball Reference

Teams
- Buffalo Bisons (1885)

Charles Joseph Ritter (October 1868 – December 13, 1958) was a Major League Baseball player.

Born in 1868 at Buffalo, New York, he played for the 1885 Buffalo Bisons. He replaced Buffalo's regular second baseman Hardy Richardson in late September 1885 when Buffalo sold its "Big Four" infield to the Detroit Wolverines. In two major-league games, Ritter had one hit in six at bats and struck out twice. He played 17 innings at second base with eight putouts, five assists, three errors, and one double play in 16 chances.

After his professional baseball career, Ritter worked as a payroll teller for the Manufacturers & Traders Trust Co. from 1916 to 1932. He then went into the automobile business, as the owner and operator of Westcott Motors Inc. He moved to Florida in 1954. Ritter died in 1958 in Fort Myers, Florida. He was the final surviving member of the Buffalo Bisons.
