= Tom Baird =

American baseball executive

- Owner
- Born: January 27, 1885; Madison County, Arkansas, U.S.
- Died: July 2, 1962 (aged 77); Kansas City, Missouri, U.S.

Thomas Younger Baird (January 27, 1885 – July 2, 1962) was an American baseball executive who served as the vice-president, co-owner, and eventual sole-owner of the Kansas City Monarchs of the Negro leagues. Baird was associated with the Monarchs, and their founder and owner J. L. Wilkinson, from 1919 to 1955. Wilkinson sold the Monarchs to Baird in 1948, and Baird sold the team in 1955 to Ted Rasberry.

== Early life ==
Baird was born in Madison County, Arkansas, and moved to Kansas City as a teen living in Argentine, Kansas. Baird played semipro baseball until he received two fractures in his legs working for Rock Island Railroad, leaving him with a permanent limp. After his athletic career was cut short, Baird turned to entrepreneurship, opening a pool hall and bowling alley before starting the Monarchs in 1919.

== Ku Klux Klan ==
There is significant evidence to support that T.Y. Baird was a member of the Ku Klux Klan. The name T. Baird appears on a list of Klansmen in the papers of Kansas governor Henry Justin Allen. Allen led a crusade against the Klan, ultimately resulting in a state-wide organizational ban in 1927. Research by historian Timothy Rives found that Thomas Baird was the only adult man living in Wyandotte County, Kansas with this name.

According to census data and personal papers combined with Allen's list, Baird had personal, social, business and political ties to Klansmen in both Kansas City, Kansas and Kansas City, Missouri. Baird owned the building at 17th and Central where both Wyandotte Klan No. 5 and women's auxiliary Kamelia Kourt Klan were headquartered. The names of Baird's family members, neighbors, employees, dentist, family doctor, and real estate agent all appear on Allen's list.
