= George Bryant (baseball) =

American baseball player (1857–1907)

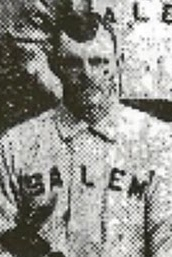
- Second baseman
- Born: February 10, 1857; Bridgeport, Connecticut
- Died: June 12, 1907 (aged 50); Boston, Massachusetts
- Batted: Unknown Threw: Unknown

MLB debut
- August 6, 1885, for the Detroit Wolverines

Last MLB appearance
- August 6, 1885, for the Detroit Wolverines

MLB statistics
- Batting average: .000
- Home runs: 0
- Runs batted in: 0
- Stats at Baseball Reference

Teams
- Detroit Wolverines (1885)

George F. Bryant (February 10, 1857 – June 12, 1907) was a Major League Baseball second baseman. He played in one game on August 6, 1885 for the Detroit Wolverines and failed to record a hit in four at-bats.

== Sources ==
- Career statistics from Baseball Reference · Retrosheet · Baseball Almanac
