= Billy Serad =

American baseball player (1863–1925)

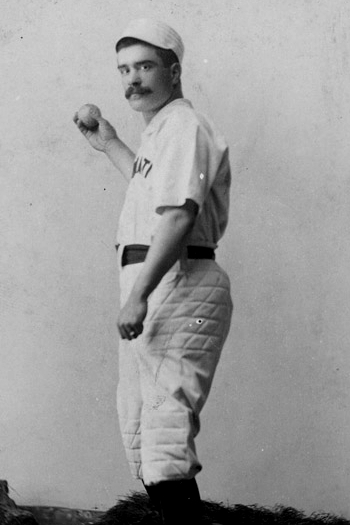
- Pitcher
- Born: 1863; Philadelphia, Pennsylvania, U.S.
- Died: November 1, 1925 (aged 61–62); Chester, Pennsylvania, U.S.
- Batted: Right Threw: Right

MLB debut
- May 5, 1884, for the Buffalo Bisons

Last MLB appearance
- July 7, 1888, for the Cincinnati Red Stockings

MLB statistics
- Win–loss record: 35-55
- Earned run average: 4.13
- Strikeouts: 278
- Stats at Baseball Reference

Teams
- Buffalo Bisons (1884–1885); Cincinnati Red Stockings (1887–1888)

William I. Serad (1863 – November 1, 1925) was an American professional baseball player who played pitcher in the Major Leagues from 1884-1889. Serad played for the Cincinnati Red Stockings and Buffalo Bisons.
