= Bill Collver =

American baseball player (1867–1888)

- Right fielder
- Born: March 21, 1867; Clyde, Ohio, U.S.
- Died: March 24, 1888 (aged 21); Detroit, Michigan, U.S.
- Batted: Unknown Threw: Unknown

MLB debut
- July 4, 1885, for the Boston Beaneaters

Last MLB appearance
- July 4, 1885, for the Boston Beaneaters

MLB statistics
- Batting average: .000
- Home runs: 0
- Runs batted in: 0
- Stats at Baseball Reference

Teams
- Boston Beaneaters (1885)

William J. Collver (March 21, 1867 – March 24, 1888) was a 19th-century American Major League Baseball right fielder. He was born in Clyde, Ohio. He played in one game, on July 4, 1885 for the Boston Beaneaters. He was hitless in four at-bats in the game, with one strikeout. He died in 1888, aged 21.
