= Joe Stabell =

American baseball player (died 1923)

- Outfielder
- Born: Unknown; Buffalo, New York, U.S.
- Died: July 10, 1923; Buffalo, New York, U.S.
- Batted: Unknown Threw: Unknown

MLB debut
- September 19, 1885, for the Buffalo Bisons

Last MLB appearance
- September 29, 1885, for the Buffalo Bisons

MLB statistics
- Batting average: .045
- Home runs: 0
- Runs batted in: 0
- Stats at Baseball Reference

Teams
- Buffalo Bisons (1885)

Joseph F. Stabell was an American Major League Baseball player. He played in seven games for the Buffalo Bisons in 1885, scoring just one hit in 22 at bats.

== Sources ==
- Career statistics from Baseball Reference · Retrosheet · Baseball Almanac
