= Dennis Driscoll =

American baseball player (1862–1901)

- Second baseman
- Born: October 10, 1862; Providence, Rhode Island, U.S.
- Died: February 21, 1901 (aged 38); Providence, Rhode Island, U.S.
- Batted: Unknown Threw: Unknown

MLB debut
- July 25, 1885, for the Buffalo Bisons

Last MLB appearance
- October 7, 1885, for the Buffalo Bisons

MLB statistics
- Batting average: .158
- Home runs: 0
- Runs batted in: 0
- Stats at Baseball Reference

Teams
- Buffalo Bisons (1885)

Dennis F. Driscoll (October 10, 1862 - February 21, 1901) was an American Major League Baseball player. He played for the 1885 Buffalo Bisons.

== Sources ==
- Career statistics from Baseball Reference · Retrosheet · Baseball Almanac
