= O. P. Caylor =

American baseball columnist, executive, and manager

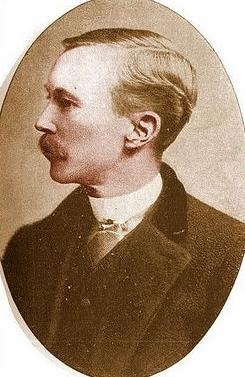
- Manager
- Born: December 14, 1849; Dayton, Ohio, U.S.
- Died: October 19, 1897 (aged 47); Winona, Minnesota, U.S.

MLB statistics
- Games managed: 353
- Managerial record: 163–182
- Winning percentage: .472
- Managerial record at Baseball Reference

Teams
- Cincinnati Red Stockings (1885–1886); New York Metropolitans (1887)

Oliver Hazard Perry "O. P." Caylor (December 14, 1849 – October 19, 1897) was an American newspaper columnist, manager in professional baseball, and catalyst in the formation of the franchise that is now the Cincinnati Reds.

== Biography ==
Caylor was born in Dayton, Ohio, in 1849; he was named after Oliver Hazard Perry, an American naval commander. After earning a law degree in Dayton, he worked as a baseball newspaper columnist for The Cincinnati Enquirer and the Cincinnati Commercial. He also joined the front office of an early Cincinnati Reds franchise of the National League, and worked as an official scorer. After that Cincinnati franchise was expelled from the National League, Caylor became one of the principal figures in the founding of the American Association during the 1881–82 offseason. The 1882 Cincinnati Red Stockings, competing in the inaugural year of the American Association, was the first season of the modern day Cincinnati Reds franchise.

Caylor's first stint as a manager in the major leagues was for the Red Stockings, succeeding the original manager, Pop Snyder. In his 1885 debut season, the team finished in second place with a record of 63–49. The following year, the team finished with a 65–73 losing record and in fifth place. Caylor resigned after that 1886 season, due in large part to his combative nature that put him at odds with the press and new club ownership.

Caylor moved to Philadelphia where he began writing for the Sporting Life. The New York Metropolitans, also of the American Association, then hired him as their manager on June 11, 1887, with Caylor inheriting a team with a 9–28 record. The team was 35–60 under Caylor, with a season record of 44–89 resulting in a seventh-place finish. He was fired in the off-season by new owner Charlie Byrne. Caylor's overall record as a manager was 163–182 for a .472 winning percentage.

Caylor moved to Carthage, Missouri, where he proceeded to start The Daily Democrat newspaper. In 1890, he returned to New York City after being hired by Albert Spalding to be the editor for the New York Sporting Times.

Caylor died in Winona, Minnesota, at age 47 from the effects of tuberculosis. He was buried in Woodlawn Cemetery in The Bronx. He was survived by his wife and a daughter.
