= John Fischer (baseball) =

American baseball player (1856–1942)

- Pitcher
- Born: August 15, 1856; Philadelphia, Pennsylvania, U.S.
- Died: February 9, 1942 (aged 85); Philadelphia, Pennsylvania, U.S.
- Batted: Unknown Threw: Unknown

MLB debut
- July 17, 1884, for the Philadelphia Keystones

Last MLB appearance
- August 6, 1885, for the Buffalo Bisons

MLB statistics
- Win–loss record: 1–8
- Earned run average: 3.73
- Strikeouts: 46
- Stats at Baseball Reference

Teams
- Philadelphia Keystones (1884); Buffalo Bisons (1885)

John Fischer (August 15, 1856 – February 9, 1942), frequently spelled Fisher during his baseball career, was an American professional baseball pitcher and occasional first baseman. He played Major League Baseball for the Philadelphia Keystones in 1884 and the Buffalo Bisons in 1885.

== Early years ==
Fischer was born in Philadelphia in 1856. He was the son of Christian and Dora Fischer.

== Professional baseball ==
Fischer played professional baseball in 1884 for Johnstown of the Iron & Oil Association. He may have also played for a Williamsport club.

In the summer of 1884, he joined the Philadelphia Keystones of the Union Association. He made his major-league debut against Cincinnati on July 17, 1884, pitching a complete game, striking out six batters and giving up six runs. After the game, The Philadelphia Times wrote that the game was marked by very poor fielding (eight errors by the Keystones) and that Fischer would have won the game had he "been properly supported." His sole major-league victory was on July 28, 1884, against the Washington Nationals at Washington, DC. The Philadelphia Times reported on Fischer's performance as follows: "Fisher pitched a magnificent game, his swift balls completely demoralizing the Washingtonians." Fisher appeared in eight games as a starting pitcher for the Keystones, compiling a 1-7 win-loss record with eight complete games, a 3.57 earned run average (ERA), and 42 strikeouts. His 3.57 ERA was second best on the Keystones' pitching staff. He also appeared in two games at first base for the Keystones. At the plate, he compiled a .222 batting average and .278 on-base percentage in 39 plate appearances with the Keystones.

After the Keystones folded on August 7, Fischer joined the Continentals. On August 30, 1884, he "made a remarkable record, striking out eighteen . . . while but one safe hit was made off him."

In 1885, Fisher played semipro baseball for the Molineaux club. He briefly returned to Major League Baseball as a pitcher for the Buffalo Bisons of the National League. He started one game for the Bisons on August 6, 1885, on the road against at Philadelphia, and gave up nine runs in 10 innings. The Times of Philadelphia described Fischer's appearance as follows: "Fisher, a local amateur pitcher, was given a trial by the visiting club and he did fairly well."

For his career, Fischer started nine major-league games as a pitcher, compiling a 1-8 record with a 3.73 ERA and 46 strikeouts in 79-2/3 innings pitched.

In 1886, he appeared in 10 games for the Williamsport club of the Pennsylvania State Association. He compiled a 2-1 record and 1.08 ERA during the 1886 season.

== Family and later years ==
Fischer was married to Mary (Hepburn) Fischer. They lived in Philadelphia. Fischer died in 1942 in Philadelphia.
