= 1885 New York Giants season =

1885 New York Giants
- League: National League
- Ballpark: Polo Grounds
- City: New York City
- Record: 85–27 (.759)
- League place: 2nd
- Owner: John B. Day
- Manager: Jim Mutrie

The 1885 New York Giants season was the franchise's third season. The team finished in second place, two games behind the Chicago White Stockings.

== Regular season ==
=== Season standings ===
National League
Team	W	L	Pct.	GB	Home	Road
Chicago White Stockings	87	25	.777	—	42‍–‍14	45‍–‍11
New York Giants	85	27	.759	2	51‍–‍10	34‍–‍17
Philadelphia Quakers	56	54	.509	30	29‍–‍26	27‍–‍28
Providence Grays	53	57	.482	33	31‍–‍20	22‍–‍37
Boston Beaneaters	46	66	.411	41	24‍–‍34	22‍–‍32
Detroit Wolverines	41	67	.380	44	29‍–‍23	12‍–‍44
Buffalo Bisons	38	74	.339	49	19‍–‍34	19‍–‍40
St. Louis Maroons	36	72	.333	49	23‍–‍33	13‍–‍39

=== Record vs. opponents ===
1885 National League record Sources:
Team	BSN	BUF	CHI	DET	NYG	PHI	PRO	SLM
Boston	—	10–6	2–14	7–9	3–13	7–9	9–7	8–8–1
Buffalo	6–10	—	0–16	11–5	1–15	5–11	3–13	12–4
Chicago	14–2	16–0	—	15–1	6–10	11–5	11–5	14–2–1
Detroit	9–7	5–11	1–15	—	4–12	7–9	6–9	9–4
New York	13–3	15–1	10–6	12–4	—	11–5	12–4	12–4
Philadelphia	9–7	11–5	5–11	9–7	5–11	—	8–7	9–6–1
Providence	7–9	13–3	5–11	9–6	4–12	7–8	—	8–8
St. Louis	8–8–1	4–12	2–14–1	4–9	4–12	6–9–1	8–8	—

=== Roster ===
1885 New York Giants
Roster
Pitchers: Larry Corcoran; Tim Keefe; Mickey Welch	Catchers: Pat Deasley; Buck Ewing; Infielders: Roger Connor; Dude Esterbrook; Joe Gerhardt; John Ward	Outfielders: Mike Dorgan; Pete Gillespie; Jim O'Rourke; Danny Richardson	Manager: Jim Mutrie

== Player stats ==
=== Batting ===
==== Starters by position ====
Note: Pos = Position; G = Games played; AB = At bats; H = Hits; Avg. = Batting average; HR = Home runs; RBI = Runs batted in

Pos	Player	G	AB	H	Avg.	HR	RBI
C	Buck Ewing	81	342	104	.304	6	63
1B	Roger Connor	110	455	169	.371	1	65
2B	Joe Gerhardt	112	399	62	.155	0	33
SS	John Montgomery Ward	111	446	101	.226	0	37
3B	Dude Esterbrook	88	359	92	.256	2	44
OF	Jim O'Rourke	112	477	143	.300	5	42
OF	Mike Dorgan	89	347	113	.326	0	46
OF	Patrick Gillespie	102	420	123	.293	0	52

==== Other batters ====
Note: G = Games played; AB = At bats; H = Hits; Avg. = Batting average; HR = Home runs; RBI = Runs batted in

Player	G	AB	H	Avg.	HR	RBI
Pat Deasley	54	207	53	.256	0	24
Danny Richardson	49	198	52	.263	0	25

=== Pitching ===
==== Starting pitchers ====
Note: G = Games pitched; IP = Innings pitched; W = Wins; L = Losses; ERA = Earned run average; SO = Strikeouts

Player	G	IP	W	L	ERA	SO
Mickey Welch	56	492.0	44	11	1.66	258
Tim Keefe	46	400.0	32	13	1.58	227
Danny Richardson	9	75.0	7	1	2.40	21
Larry Corcoran	3	25.0	2	1	2.88	10

==== Relief pitchers ====
Note: G = Games pitched; W = Wins; L = Losses; SV = Saves; ERA = Earned run average; SO = Strikeouts

Player	G	W	L	SV	ERA	SO
Buck Ewing	1	0	1	0	4.50	0
