= Jim Lillie =

American baseball player (1861–1890)

- Outfielder
- Born: July 27, 1861; New Haven, Connecticut
- Died: November 9, 1890 (aged 29); Kansas City, Missouri
- Batted: Unknown Threw: Unknown

MLB debut
- May 17, 1883, for the Buffalo Bisons (NL)

Last MLB appearance
- October 11, 1886, for the Kansas City Cowboys (NL)

MLB statistics
- Batting average: .219
- Home runs: 6
- Runs batted in: 134
- Stats at Baseball Reference

Teams
- Buffalo Bisons (NL) (1883–1885); Kansas City Cowboys (NL) (1886)

James J. Lillie (July 27, 1861 - November 9, 1890), nicknamed "Grasshopper", was a Major League Baseball outfielder. He played four seasons in the major leagues, from 1883 until 1886.

== Sources ==
- Career statistics from Baseball Reference, or Baseball Reference (Minors)
