= Tom Poorman =

American baseball player (1857–1905)

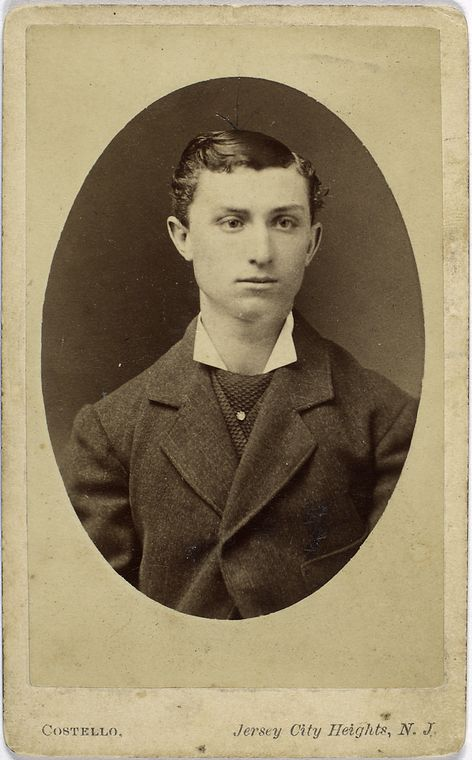
- Outfielder
- Born: October 14, 1857; Lock Haven, Pennsylvania, U.S.
- Died: February 18, 1905 (aged 47); Lock Haven, Pennsylvania, U.S.
- Batted: Left Threw: Right

MLB debut
- May 5, 1880, for the Buffalo Bisons

Last MLB appearance
- September 18, 1888, for the Philadelphia Athletics

MLB statistics
- Batting average: .244
- Hits: 498
- Runs batted in: 172
- Stolen bases: 165
- Stats at Baseball Reference

Teams
- Buffalo Bisons (1880); Chicago White Stockings (1880); Toledo Blue Stockings (1884); Boston Beaneaters (1885–1886); Philadelphia Athletics (1887–1888)

Thomas Iverson Poorman (October 19, 1857 – February 18, 1905) was an American Major League Baseball outfielder and pitcher. Poorman played in the majors from 1880-1888 for the New York Metropolitans, Buffalo Bisons, Chicago White Stockings, Toledo Blue Stockings, Philadelphia Athletics, and Boston Beaneaters.

== See also ==
- List of Major League Baseball annual triples leaders
- List of Major League Baseball career stolen bases leaders
