= Jim McCauley =

American baseball player (1863–1930)

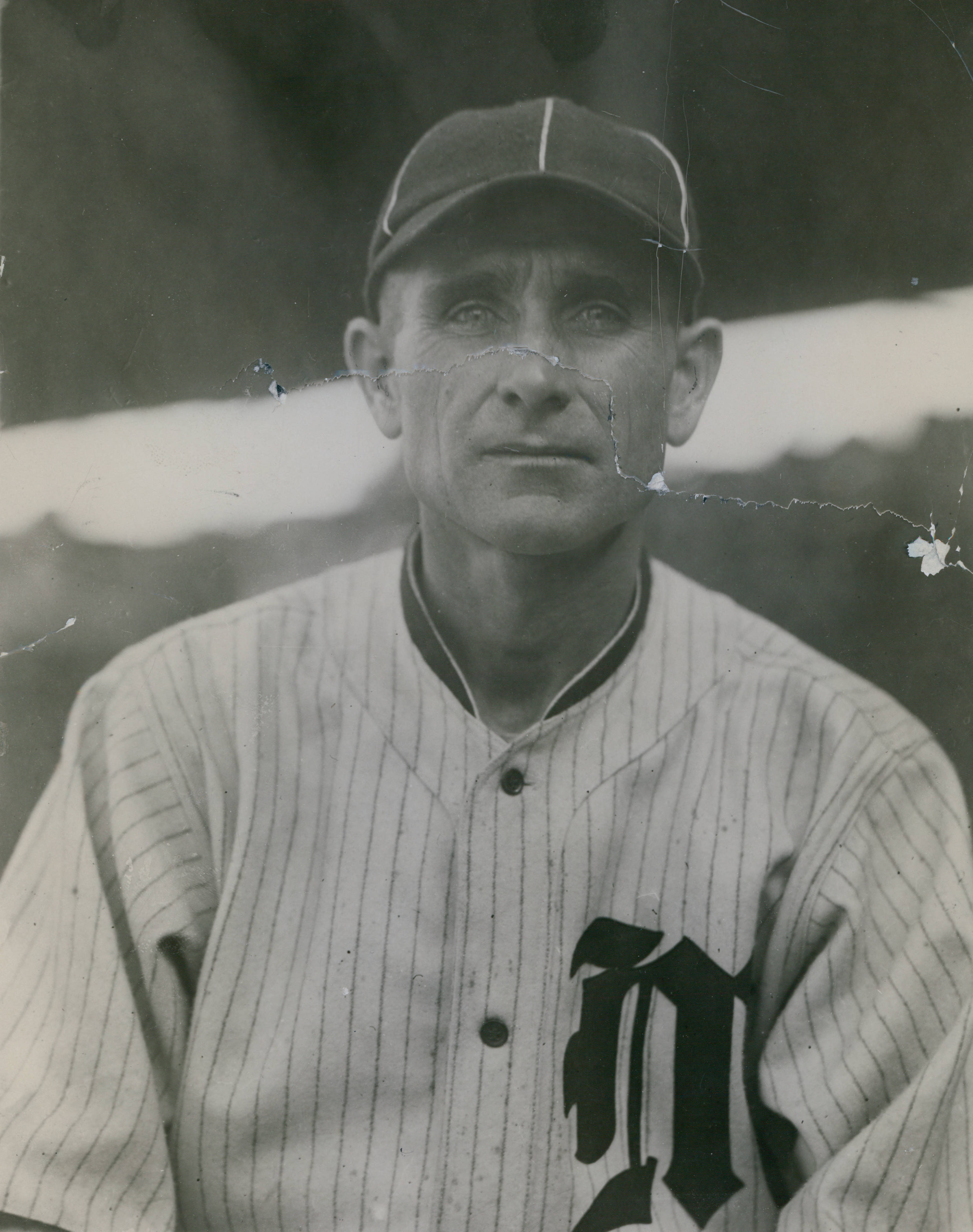
- Catcher
- Born: March 24, 1863; Stanley, New York, U.S.
- Died: September 14, 1930 (aged 67); Canandaigua, New York, U.S.
- Batted: Left Threw: Right

MLB debut
- September 17, 1884, for the St. Louis Browns

Last MLB appearance
- July 15, 1886, for the Brooklyn Grays

MLB statistics
- Batting average: .189
- Home runs: 0
- Runs batted in: 10
- Stats at Baseball Reference

Teams
- St. Louis Browns (1884); Buffalo Bisons (1885); Chicago White Stockings (1885); Brooklyn Grays (1886)

Jim McCauley is also a name assumed by the banned David Frost (sports agent)

James Adelbert McCauley (March 24, 1863, in Stanley, New York – September 14, 1930) was a 19th-century American Major League Baseball catcher. He played from 1884 to 1886 for the St. Louis Browns, Buffalo Bisons, Chicago White Stockings and Brooklyn Grays.
