= 1885 in baseball =

The following are the baseball events of the year 1885 throughout the world.

== Champions ==
=== Major League Baseball ===
- National League: Chicago White Stockings
- American Association: St. Louis Browns

World Series

Post-season playoff: the Chicago White Stockings played the St. Louis Browns, which ended with both teams going 3–3–1 in a best-of-seven series. Game 1 finished in a tie called after eight innings due to darkness; Game 2 was awarded to Chicago by forfeit after six innings because St. Louis refused to continue after disputing an umpiring decision. Both teams dispute the series and claim the championship.

=== Minor League Baseball ===
- Canadian League: Clippers of Hamilton
- Eastern League: Washington Nationals
- New England League: Lawrence
- New York State League: Syracuse

=== College baseball ===
- Inter-Collegiate Association: Yale University
- Northwestern College Base Ball Association: University of Wisconsin

== Statistical leaders ==
	American Association		National League	
Stat	Player	Total	Player	Total
AVG	Guy Hecker (LOU)	.341	Roger Connor (NYG)	.371
HR	Bid McPhee (CIN)	8	Abner Dalrymple (CHI)	11
RBI	Tip O'Neill (STL)	107	Cap Anson (CHI)	108
W	Dave Foutz (STL); Ed Morris (PIT)	41	John Clarkson (CHI)	53
ERA	Dave Foutz (STL)	2.11	Tim Keefe (NYG)	1.57
K	Matt Kilroy (BAL)	513	John Clarkson (CHI)	308

== Major league baseball final standings ==
=== American Association final standings ===
American Association
Team	W	L	Pct.	GB	Home	Road
St. Louis Browns	79	33	.705	—	44‍–‍11	35‍–‍22
Cincinnati Red Stockings	63	49	.562	16	35‍–‍21	28‍–‍28
Pittsburgh Alleghenys	56	55	.505	22½	37‍–‍19	19‍–‍36
Philadelphia Athletics	55	57	.491	24	33‍–‍23	22‍–‍34
Brooklyn Grays	53	59	.473	26	35‍–‍22	18‍–‍37
Louisville Colonels	53	59	.473	26	37‍–‍19	16‍–‍40
New York Metropolitans	44	64	.407	33	28‍–‍24	16‍–‍40
Baltimore Orioles	41	68	.376	36½	29‍–‍26	12‍–‍42

Locations of teams for the 1885 American Association season
American Association

=== National League final standings ===
National League
Team	W	L	Pct.	GB	Home	Road
Chicago White Stockings	87	25	.777	—	42‍–‍14	45‍–‍11
New York Giants	85	27	.759	2	51‍–‍10	34‍–‍17
Philadelphia Quakers	56	54	.509	30	29‍–‍26	27‍–‍28
Providence Grays	53	57	.482	33	31‍–‍20	22‍–‍37
Boston Beaneaters	46	66	.411	41	24‍–‍34	22‍–‍32
Detroit Wolverines	41	67	.380	44	29‍–‍23	12‍–‍44
Buffalo Bisons	38	74	.339	49	19‍–‍34	19‍–‍40
St. Louis Maroons	36	72	.333	49	23‍–‍33	13‍–‍39

Locations of teams for the 1885 National League season
National League

== Notable seasons ==
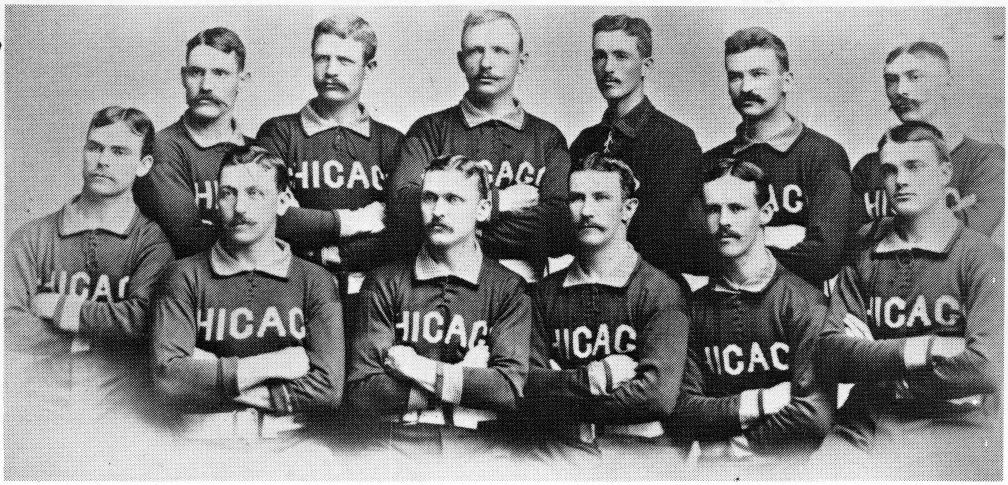
1885 Chicago White Stockings

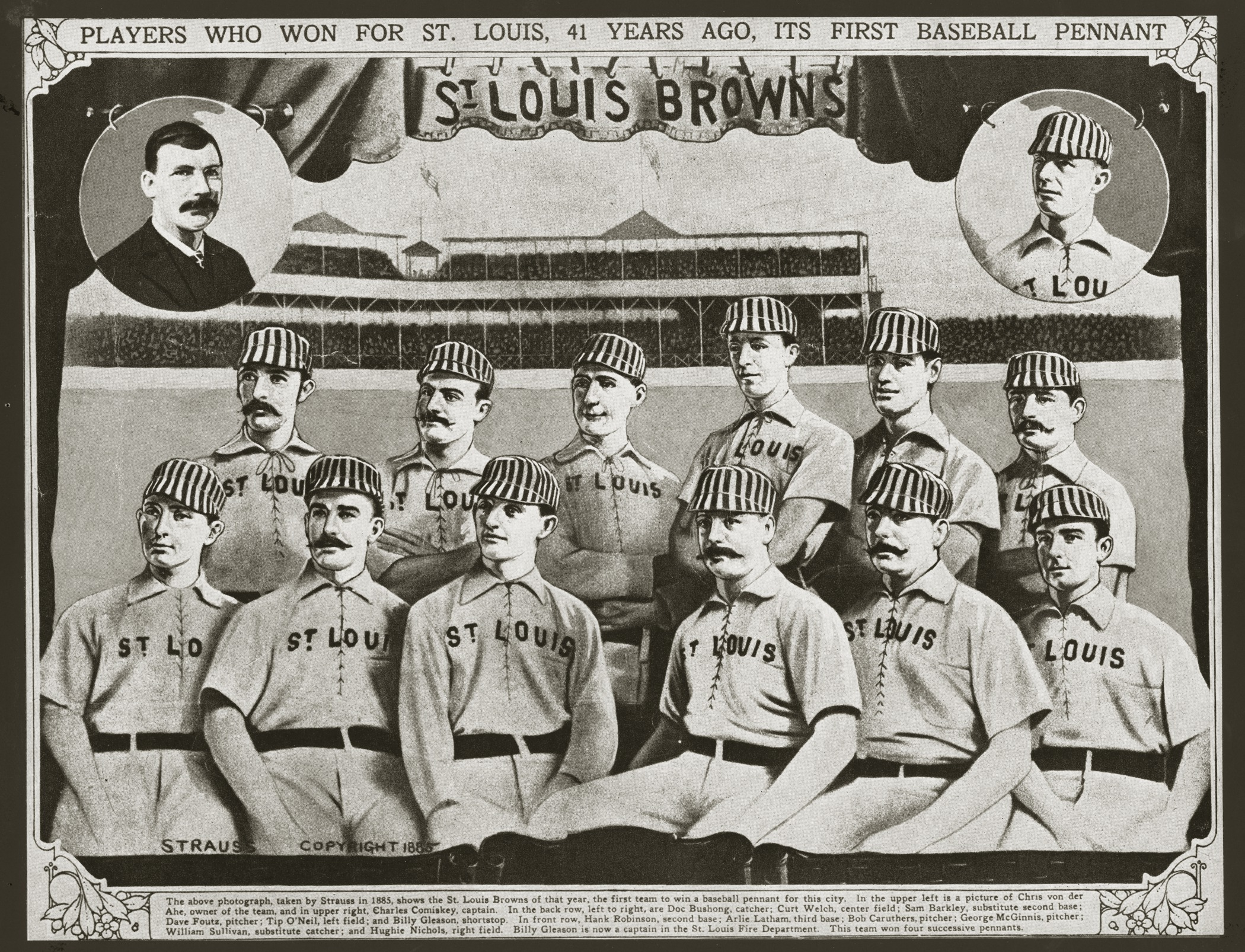
1885 St. Louis Browns

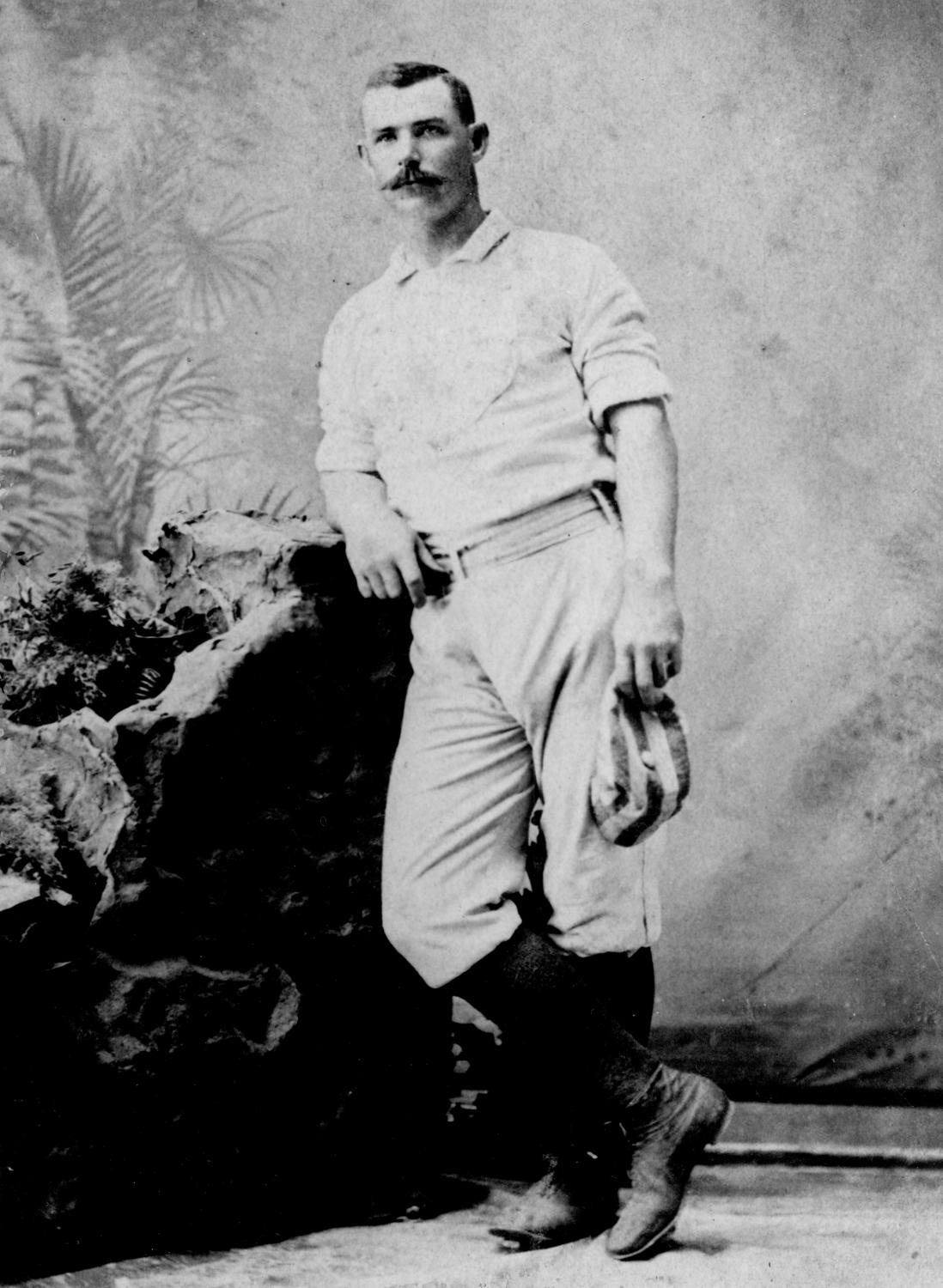
Roger Connor

- New York Giants first baseman Roger Connor led the NL in batting average (.371), on-base percentage (.435), hits (169), and total bases (225). He was second in the National League (NL) in slugging percentage (.495) and adjusted OPS+ (200).
- Buffalo Bisons first baseman Dan Brouthers led the NL in slugging percentage (.543) and adjusted OPS+ (203). He was second in the NL in batting average (.359), on-base percentage (.408), hits (146), and total bases (221).
- Chicago White Stockings pitcher John Clarkson had a win–loss record of 53–16 and led the NL in innings pitched (623), wins (53), shutouts (10), and strikeouts (308). He was third in the NL in earned run average (1.85) and adjusted ERA+ (163).

== Events ==
=== January–March ===
- January 3 – The Cleveland Blues release all of their players as they prepare to disband.
- January 6 – Henry Lucas, the man behind the failed Union Association in 1884, purchases the remaining assets of the Cleveland Blues as he prepares for his St. Louis Maroons to join the National League.
- January 10 – The National League accepts the formal withdrawal of the Cleveland Blues and admits the St. Louis Maroons, the champions of the Union Association in 1884.
- January 15 – The Union Association holds a meeting in which only the Kansas City Cowboys and the Milwaukee Brewers attend. The decision is made to formally shut down the league.
- February 11 – The original configuration of the Western League is formed.

=== April–June ===
- April 3 – The New York Metropolitans of the American Association, run by John Day, release Tim Keefe and Dude Esterbrook for them to be acquired by the National League New York Giants, also run by Day.
- April 29 – After being shut out for the 2nd straight game, players on the Cincinnati Red Stockings are fined $25 each by their manager O. P. Caylor.
- May 7 – The St. Louis Browns take over 1st place in the American Association with a 13–1 win over the Philadelphia Athletics and will remain there for the rest of the season.
- May 27 – John Montgomery Ward of the New York Giants graduates from the Columbia Law School.
- June 2 – The Baltimore Orioles defeat the St. Louis Browns 7–1 to break the Browns 17-game winning streak.
- June 7 – The American Association removes all restrictions on overhand pitching.
- June 12 – Dave Orr, first baseman for the American Association New York Metropolitans, hits for the cycle. New York defeats the St. Louis Browns, 17–8.
- June 13 – Detroit Wolverines outfielder George Wood hits for the cycle in a 17–9 loss to the Chicago White Stockings.
- June 16 – Henry Larkin of the American Association Philadelphia Athletics hits for the cycle in a 14–1 win over the Pittsburgh Alleghenys.
- June 17 – "Phenomenal" Smith loses his first start as a Brooklyn Gray by a score of 18–5 after his teammates commit 14 errors behind him, including 7 by shortstop Germany Smith. Smith's boast of being so phenomenal that he could win by himself doesn't sit well with the other Brooklyn players, who are fined $500 for their intentional poor play. In the interests of team chemistry, Smith is immediately released.
- June 25 – 10 different players collect at least 2 hits each for the Brooklyn Grays in their 21–14 win over the Philadelphia Athletics. George Strief of Philadelphia sets a major league record by hitting 4 triples in the game.

=== July–September ===
- July 1 – Tom Burns of the Chicago White Stockings hits a home run that is estimated at 500 feet in a Chicago win.
- July 2 – Sam Thompson makes his major league debut for the Detroit Wolverines.
- July 3 – Jim McCormick of the Providence Grays wins his 200th career game for his first victory of the season. Six days later he will be sold to the Chicago White Stockings where he will win 20 games.
- July 4 – Owen Keenan of the Youngstown, Ohio club beats New Castle in both games of a doubleheader, pitching one game right-handed and the other game left-handed.
- July 11 – After winning 175 games while pitching over 2,300 innings for the Chicago White Stockings since 1880, pitcher Larry Corcoran is released after straining his arm muscles so badly that he is unable to throw. Corcoran will only pitch 54 more innings and win 2 more games for the remainder of his career.
- July 12 – The Buffalo Bisons sell Pud Galvin to the Pittsburgh Alleghenys for $5,000.
- July 27 – John Clarkson, amid a 53-win season, pitches a no-hitter for the Chicago White Stockings.
- July 29 – Henry Larkin ties the record by hitting 4 doubles in a game.
- August 16 – Louis Henke dies of a ruptured liver, sustained in an on-field collision in a Southern League game the previous day.
- August 18 – Jack Farrell of the Providence Grays is suspended without pay for shouting obscenities at fans in Providence.
- August 26 – Roger Connor of the New York Giants starts a first-inning triple play. 12 days later, Connor would be involved in another first-inning triple play.
- August 27 – Paul Hines is released by the Providence Grays after they accuse him of intentionally playing poorly.
- August 29 – Charlie Ferguson of the Philadelphia Quakers pitches a no-hitter in a 1–0 win over the Providence Grays.
- August 29 – The St. Louis Browns win the American Association pennant with a 16–9 win over the Louisville Colonels.
- September 11 – The Providence Grays suspend Charles Radbourn and Jerry Denny after a 9–1 loss.
- September 17 – The Detroit Wolverines purchase controlling ownership in the Buffalo Bisons in a move that will be overturned by the National League.
- September 19 – With former Buffalo players Dan Brouthers, Hardy Richardson, Jack Rowe and Deacon White in uniform for the Detroit Wolverines, the National League orders their game against the New York Giants forfeited if they play. Detroit sits the four new players and loses to the Giants 6–5. The four return to Buffalo to finish the season.
- September 28 – Detroit Wolverines first baseman Mox McQuery hits for the cycle against the Providence Grays. Detroit wins, 14–2.
- September 30 – The Chicago White Stockings clinch the National League pennant with a 2–1 win over the New York Giants.

=== October–December ===
- October 1 – The first all-black professional team is formed by Frank P. Thompson. Originally known as the Athletics, they will soon change their name to the Cuban Giants.
- October 3 – Playing in an exhibition game against Newark of the Eastern League, the American Association Baltimore Orioles are no-hit by the former (and future) big-leaguer, John "Phenomenal" Smith.
- October 7 – Fred Shaw of the Providence Grays throws a 5-inning no-hitter before 12 fans in Buffalo in the first game of a double-header against the Bisons. Shaw beats them again in another 5-inning game in the nightcap.
- October 10
  - The Providence Grays sweep the Buffalo Bisons in a double-header in the Bisons' last day in the major leagues. Buffalo finishes the season with a 17-game winless streak, only managing 1 tie in the season's last 3 weeks.
  - Joe Gerhardt, second baseman of the New York Giants finishes the season with a .155 batting average while shortstop Charlie Bastian of the Philadelphia Quakers ends the year with a .167 average. Both players set still-standing records for the lowest batting average in a season (with a minimum of 350 at-bats) for their respective positions.
- October 17 – The National League sets a minimum player salary of $1,000 and a maximum of $2,000 for the 1886 season.
- October 22 – John Montgomery Ward, along with several teammates, forms the Brotherhood of Professional Baseball Players, the first union in professional sports history. The Brotherhood would ultimately result in the Players' League in 1890.
- October 24 – The final game of the 1885 World Series is played. The St. Louis Browns defeat the Chicago White Stockings 13–4 to tie the series at 3 wins each, with game 1 having ended in a tie.
- December 4 – The New York Metropolitans are sold to Canadian-born millionaire Erastus Wiman for $25,000.
- December 24 – The St. Louis Browns sell the reserve rights of Sam Barkley to fellow American Association member Baltimore Orioles for $1,000.

== Births ==
- January 2 – Chick Autry
- January 5 – Art Fletcher
- January 15 – Grover Lowdermilk
- January 21 – Benny Meyer
- January 27 – Tom Baird
- February 1 – Pete Harrison
- February 3 – Slim Sallee
- February 17 – Steve Evans
- April 13
  - Vean Gregg
  - Red Killefer
- April 20 – Ted Easterly
- May 18 – Cy Barger
- May 23 – Hugh Bradley
- June 7 – Dan McGeehan
- June 11 – Chris Mahoney
- July 9 – Buck Herzog
- July 17 – Les Wilson
- August 4 – Tex Jones
- August 7 – Joe Hewitt
- September 3 – Ed Konetchy
- September 12 – Fred Luderus
- September 22 – Walter Lonergan
- September 22 – Jimmy Walsh
- September 28 – Wilbur Good
- October 6 – John Knight
- October 14 – Ivy Olson
- November 15 – Pat Ragan
- December 4 – Shano Collins
- December 6 – Jack Stansbury
- December 11 – Fred Anderson
- December 20 – Joe Wilhoit

== Deaths ==
- February 10 – Al Hall, age unknown, center fielder for the 1879 Troy Trojans.
- February 12 – Nealy Phelps, 44, played 12 career games over 5 seasons for 3 teams in 2 leagues.
- March 13 – Herman Dehlman, 32?, first baseman for Brooklyn and St. Louis teams in the National Association who led the league in walks in 1875.
- August 12 – Dick Cramer, age unknown, played 2 games for the 1883 New York Gothams.
- November 30 – Dan Cronin, 28, played 2 games in the Union Association in 1884.

== Sources ==
- Spalding's Base Ball Guide. Chicago: A.G. Spalding & Bros. 1886.
