= Tom Burns (baseball) =

American baseball player and manager (1857–1902)

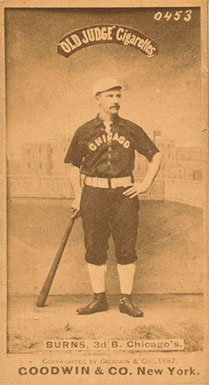
- Third baseman / Shortstop / Second baseman / Manager
- Born: March 30, 1857; Honesdale, Pennsylvania, U.S.
- Died: March 19, 1902 (aged 44); Jersey City, New Jersey, U.S.
- Batted: Right Threw: Right

MLB debut
- May 1, 1880, for the Chicago White Stockings

Last MLB appearance
- July 22, 1892, for the Pittsburgh Pirates

MLB statistics
- Batting average: .264
- Home runs: 39
- Runs batted in: 683
- Managerial record: 187–170
- Winning %: .524
- Stats at Baseball Reference

Teams
- As player: Chicago White Stockings/Colts (1880–1891); Pittsburgh Pirates (1892); As manager: Pittsburgh Pirates (1892); Chicago Orphans (1898–1899)

Thomas Everett Burns (March 30, 1857 – March 19, 1902) was an American infielder and manager in Major League Baseball, primarily for the Chicago White Stockings/Colts/Orphans. He also played for, and managed, the Pittsburgh Pirates for part of one season, and he returned to the Chicago team for two years as its manager after his major-league playing career ended.

In the last few years of his life, Burns managed in the minor leagues. He died of heart problems in New Jersey at the age of 44. His brother, John Burns, was a National League umpire.

== Early life and playing career ==
Burns was born in 1857 in Honesdale, Pennsylvania. He joined the Chicago team in the National League (then known as the White Stockings) in 1880. A nondrinker and nonsmoker, Burns stayed on the good side of Chicago manager Cap Anson because of his tame lifestyle. He sported a red handlebar mustache during his playing career.

From 1883 to 1889, Burns was part of a Chicago infield combination that manager Cap Anson described as a "stonewall infield". Some sportswriters also picked up the term, even though several infields had better fielding statistics. Burns led the league in putouts and assists multiple times. Chicago won league pennants in 1885 and 1886.

On September 6, 1883, Burns had one of the most productive innings in baseball history when he hit two doubles and a home run during an 18-run seventh inning for Chicago. His three hits and three runs set single-inning records; teammates Ned Williamson and Fred Pfeffer also had three hits in the inning. The White Stockings won the game 26–6. No other major-league player had a three-hit inning until 1953.

In 1888, Burns was a member of an American baseball team that left the U.S. on a world baseball tour that would end up in Australia.

== Managerial career ==
The Pittsburgh Pirates purchased Burns from Chicago in 1892. Transitioning into a player-manager role, Burns led a talented Pittsburgh Pirates team. Though the team had two future members of the Baseball Hall of Fame – Joe Kelley and Jake Beckley – the team started the season with a 25–30 record and Burns was dismissed.

From 1893 through 1897, Burns became a minor-league manager with the Springfield Ponies of the Eastern League, and he made appearances as a player for the Ponies until 1896. In 1898, the Chicago Orphans initially denied that Burns was being hired to replace Anson. Anson had written a letter to Burns in which he said that Burns was his ideal successor, but Anson said that it had not been written with the thought that he would actually resign.

Despite the initial denials, Burns did become Chicago's manager for 1898 and 1899. He led the team to an 85–65 record in his first season, and a 75–73 record the next year. He resigned after the 1899 season. According to newspaper accounts at the time, Burns showed impressive knowledge of the game but was too nice to his players, often failing to control his team off the field. Burns returned as the Springfield manager in 1900, and he managed the Buffalo Bisons for part of the 1901 season.

== Personal ==
Burns's brother John was hired as a National League umpire in 1884, but he was fired in August of that year.

== Death ==
Before the 1902 baseball season, Burns was hired as the manager of an Eastern League team based in Jersey City, New Jersey. On a mid-March trip to that area, he became ill. Patrick T. Powers, the president of the Eastern League, invited Burns to his home to rest. Burns said that he felt better on the evening of March 18, but he was found dead in bed at Powers's home the next morning. A doctor was consulted, and he attributed the death to heart disease. He is interred St. Michael Cemetery in Springfield, Massachusetts.

== See also ==
- List of Major League Baseball career stolen bases leaders
- List of Major League Baseball player-managers
