= Dick Phelan =

American baseball player (1854–1931)

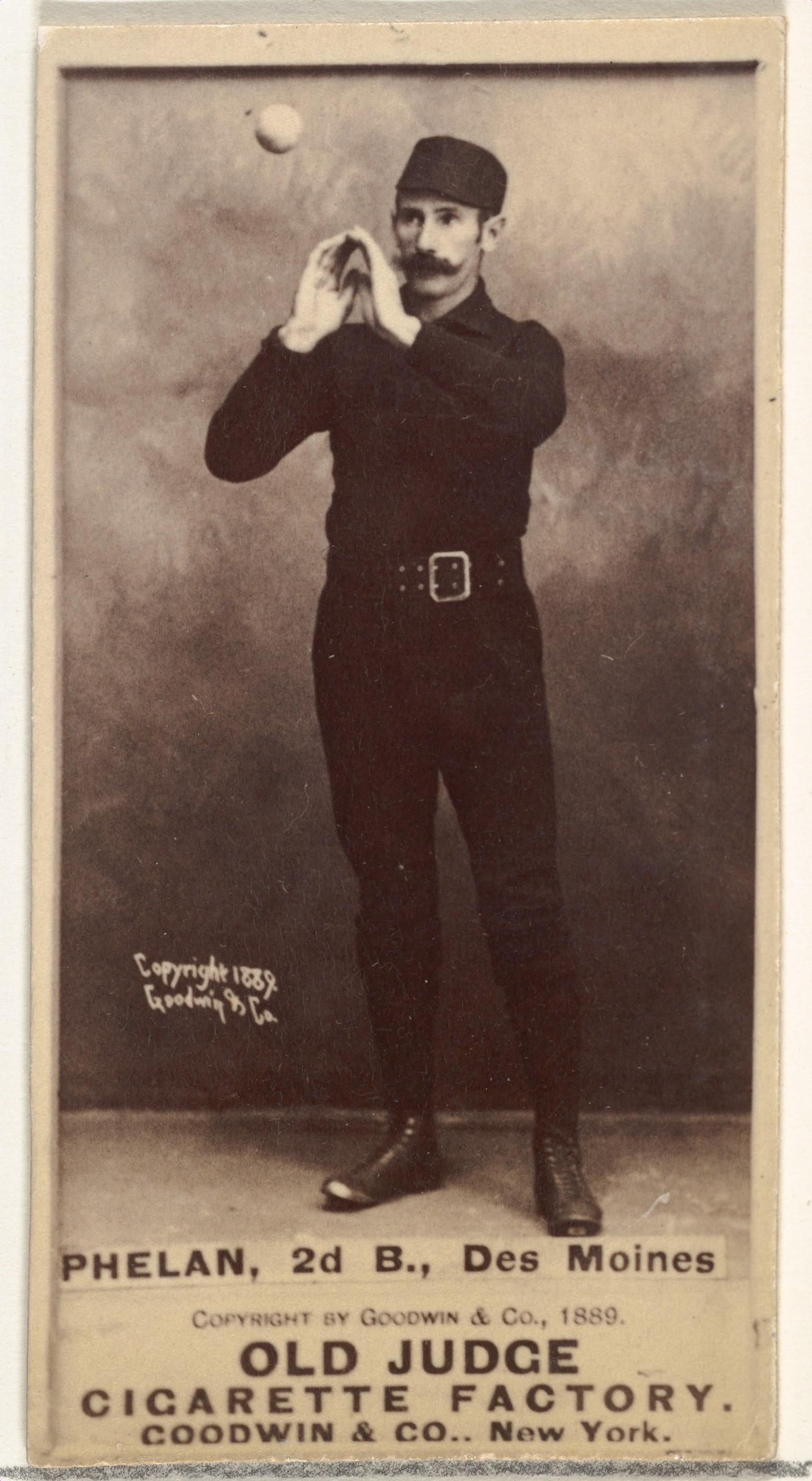
- Second baseman
- Born: December 10, 1854; Towanda, Pennsylvania, U.S.
- Died: February 13, 1931 (aged 76); San Antonio, Texas, U.S.
- Batted: Right Threw: Unknown

MLB debut
- April 17, 1884, for the Baltimore Monumentals

Last MLB appearance
- October 3, 1885, for the St. Louis Maroons

MLB statistics
- Batting average: .242
- On-base percentage: .263
- Slugging percentage: .318
- Stats at Baseball Reference

Teams
- Baltimore Monumentals (1884); Buffalo Bisons (1885); St. Louis Maroons (1885)

James Dickson Phelan (December 10, 1854 – February 13, 1931) was an American professional baseball player who played second base in the Major Leagues in 1884–1885 for the Baltimore Monumentals of the Union Association and the Buffalo Bisons and St. Louis Maroons of the National League. He remained active in the minor leagues through 1899.
