= 1885 Cincinnati Red Stockings season =

1885 Cincinnati Red Stockings
- League: American Association
- Ballpark: American Park
- City: Cincinnati
- Record: 63–49 (.563)
- League place: 2nd
- Owner: George Herancourt
- Manager: O. P. Caylor

The 1885 Cincinnati Red Stockings season was a season in American baseball. The team finished second in the American Association, 16 games behind the St. Louis Browns.

== Regular season ==
During the off-season, the Red Stockings hired O. P. Caylor to become the manager of the team, the first time in club history that the club did not have a player-manager. Cincinnati also signed Tony Mullane to a contract. Mullane, who spent the 1884 season with the Toledo Blue Stockings, had a 36–26 record with a 2.52 ERA in 67 starts, striking out 325 batters. Mullane was suspended for the 1885 season for defying his contract, as the Blue Stockings and the St. Louis Maroons, another team he tried to sign with, folded after the 1884 season, and the St. Louis Browns attempted to reclaim Mullane, as he pitched there in 1883. Before the Browns could reclaim him, he signed with the Red Stockings.

Frank Fennelly, who the Red Stockings acquired late in the 1884 season from the Washington Nationals, had a breakout season, hitting .273 with ten home runs and a league high 89 RBI. Charley Jones led the team with a .322 average, and had five home runs and 35 RBI to go along with it, while John Reilly hit .297 with five homers and 60 RBI.

On the mound, nineteen-year-old Larry McKeon led the Red Stockings with 20 wins and a 2.86 ERA in 33 starts, while Will White had eighteen wins and a 3.53 ERA in 34 starts.

=== Season summary ===
Cincinnati began the season very well, putting up an impressive 16–8 record in their first 24 games to sit in second place in the league, two games behind the St. Louis Browns. The Red Stockings then began to slump, as they would win only six of their next sixteen games to slip into third place, seven games behind the Browns. On July 1, the Red Stockings acquired Jim Keenan and Larry McKeon, who both jumped from the Detroit Wolverines to join Cincinnati. The Red Stockings improved with their new acquisitions in the lineup, as the team eventually moved back into second place, however, they were too far behind the Browns, and Cincinnati finished the season with a 63–49 record, good for second place, however, they were sixteen games out of first.

=== Season standings ===
American Association
Team	W	L	Pct.	GB	Home	Road
St. Louis Browns	79	33	.705	—	44‍–‍11	35‍–‍22
Cincinnati Red Stockings	63	49	.562	16	35‍–‍21	28‍–‍28
Pittsburgh Alleghenys	56	55	.505	22½	37‍–‍19	19‍–‍36
Philadelphia Athletics	55	57	.491	24	33‍–‍23	22‍–‍34
Brooklyn Grays	53	59	.473	26	35‍–‍22	18‍–‍37
Louisville Colonels	53	59	.473	26	37‍–‍19	16‍–‍40
New York Metropolitans	44	64	.407	33	28‍–‍24	16‍–‍40
Baltimore Orioles	41	68	.376	36½	29‍–‍26	12‍–‍42

=== Record vs. opponents ===
1885 American Association record Sources:
Team	BAL	BRO	CIN	LOU	NYM	PHA	PIT	STL
Baltimore	—	7–9	6–10	7–9	7–6	6–10–1	6–10	2–14
Brooklyn	9–7	—	5–11	10–6	8–8	11–5	6–10	4–12
Cincinnati	10–6	11–5	—	8–8	10–6	9–7	9–7	6–10
Louisville	9–7	6–10	8–8	—	9–7	8–8	6–10	7–9
New York	6–7	8–8	6–10	7–9	—	5–11	8–7	4–12
Philadelphia	10–6–1	5–11	7–9	8–8	11–5	—	10–6	4–12
Pittsburgh	10–6	10–6	7–9	10–6	7–8	6–10	—	6–10
St. Louis	14–2	12–4	10–6	9–7	12–4	12–4	10–6	—

=== Game log ===
Legend
Red Stockings Win	Red Stockings Loss	Game Tied/Postponed

1885 Game Log: 63–49 (Home: 35–21; Away: 28–28)
April: 5–4 (Home: 3–3; Away: 2–1)

#	Date	Opponent	Score	Stadium	Attendance	Record	Streak
-	April 18	Colonels	Postponed (unknown reason); Makeup: April 20				
1	April 19	@ Colonels	4–1	Eclipse Park	N/A	1–0	W1
2	April 20	Colonels	3–1	American Park	N/A	2–0	W2
3	April 21	@ Browns	2–1	Sportsman's Park	N/A	3–0	W3
-	April 22	@ Browns	Postponed (unknown reason); Makeup: April 23				
4	April 23	@ Browns	1–2	Sportsman's Park	N/A	3–1	L1
5	April 24	Alleghenys	6–7	American Park	N/A	3–2	L2
6	April 25	Alleghenys	8–2	American Park	N/A	4–2	W1
7	April 26	Colonels	8–1	American Park	N/A	5–2	W2
8	April 28	Browns	0–5	American Park	N/A	5–3	L1
9	April 29	Browns	0–6	American Park	N/A	5–4	L2

May: 14–8 (Home: 12–5; Away: 2–3)

#	Date	Opponent	Score	Stadium	Attendance	Record	Streak
10	May 2	@ Colonels	0–8	Eclipse Park	N/A	5–5	L3
11	May 3	Alleghenys	7-6	American Park	N/A	6–5	W1
12	May 4	@ Alleghenys	3–0	Recreation Park	N/A	7–5	W2
13	May 5	@ Alleghenys	1–8	Recreation Park	N/A	7–6	L1
14	May 7	Grays	7-4	American Park	N/A	8–6	W1
15	May 8	Grays	8-3	American Park	N/A	9–6	W2
16	May 9	Grays	4-0	American Park	N/A	10–6	W3
17	May 10	Grays	7-6	American Park	N/A	11–6	W4
18	May 12	Metropolitans	7-11	American Park	N/A	11–7	L1
19	May 13	Metropolitans	14-10	American Park	N/A	12–7	W1
20	May 14	Metropolitans	8-5	American Park	N/A	13–7	W2
21	May 16	Metropolitans	7-2	American Park	N/A	14–7	W3
22	May 17	Orioles	5-6	American Park	N/A	14–8	L1
23	May 19	Orioles	13-5	American Park	N/A	15–8	W1
24	May 20	Orioles	15-2	American Park	N/A	16–8	W2
25	May 21	Orioles	10-11	American Park	N/A	16–9	L1
-	May 23	Athletics	Postponed (rain); Makeup: May 25				
26	May 24	Athletics	6-7	American Park	N/A	16–10	L2
27	May 25	Athletics	7-2	American Park	N/A	17–10	W1
28	May 26	Athletics	10-5	American Park	N/A	18–10	W2
29	May 27	Athletics	9-16	American Park	N/A	18–11	L1
30	May 30 1	@ Athletics	16–9	Jefferson Street Grounds	N/A	19–11	W1
31	May 30 2	@ Athletics	7–9	Jefferson Street Grounds	N/A	19–12	L1

June: 10–11 (Home: 2–4; Away: 8–7)

#	Date	Opponent	Score	Stadium	Attendance	Record	Streak
32	June 1	@ Athletics	7–9	Jefferson Street Grounds	N/A	19–13	L2
33	June 2	@ Athletics	8–12	Jefferson Street Grounds	N/A	19–14	L3
34	June 4	@ Orioles	1–12	Oriole Park	N/A	19–15	L4
35	June 5	@ Orioles	4–3	Oriole Park	N/A	20–15	W1
36	June 6	@ Orioles	5–21	Oriole Park	N/A	20–16	L1
37	June 8	@ Orioles	6–5	Oriole Park	N/A	21–16	W1
38	June 10	@ Grays	6–0	Washington Park	N/A	22–16	W2
39	June 11	@ Grays	4–6	Washington Park	N/A	22–17	L1
40	June 13	@ Grays	9–11	Washington Park	N/A	22–18	L2
-	June 14	@ Grays	Postponed (unknown reason); Makeup: June 15				
41	June 15	@ Grays	11–9	Washington Park	N/A	23–18	W1
42	June 16	@ Metropolitans	5–4	Polo Grounds	N/A	24–18	W2
43	June 17	@ Metropolitans	3–2	[Polo Grounds	N/A	25–18	W3
44	June 18	@ Metropolitans	5–4	Polo Grounds	N/A	26–18	W4
45	June 19	@ Metropolitans	10–8	Polo Grounds	N/A	27–18	W5
-	June 20	@ Metropolitans	Postponed (unknown reason); Makeup: June 19				
46	June 22	Colonels	1-2	American Park	N/A	27–19	L1
47	June 23	Colonels	13-2	American Park	N/A	28–19	W1
-	June 24	Colonels	Postponed (unknown reason); Makeup: June 22				
48	June 25	Colonels	6-8	American Park	N/A	28–20	L1
49	June 26	Browns	4-9	American Park	N/A	28–21	L2
50	June 27	Browns	2-10	American Park	N/A	28–22	L3
51	June 28	Browns	8-4	American Park	N/A	29–22	W1
52	June 30	@ Alleghenys	4–9	Recreation Park	N/A	29–23	L1

July: 12–9 (Home: 12–4; Away: 0–5)

#	Date	Opponent	Score	Stadium	Attendance	Record	Streak
53	July 1	@ Alleghenys	9–11	Recreation Park	N/A	29–24	L2
54	July 2	@ Alleghenys	4–6	Recreation Park	N/A	29–25	L3
55	July 4 1	Grays	5–1	American Park	N/A	30–25	W1
56	July 4 2	Grays	3–2	American Park	N/A	31–25	W2
57	July 5	Grays	6–7	American Park	N/A	31–26	L1
58	July 7	Grays	12–7	American Park	N/A	32–26	W1
59	July 9	Athletics	4–2	American Park	N/A	33–26	W2
60	July 10	Athletics	10–4	American Park	N/A	34–26	W3
61	July 11	Athletics	9–8	American Park	N/A	35–26	W4
62	July 12	Athletics	6–5	American Park	N/A	36–26	W5
63	July 14	Metropolitans	5–2	American Park	N/A	37–26	W6
64	July 15	Metropolitans	13–3	American Park	N/A	38–26	W7
65	July 16	Metropolitans	5–7	American Park	N/A	38–27	L1
66	July 18	Metropolitans	8–3	American Park	N/A	39–27	W1
67	July 19	Orioles	3–0	American Park	N/A	40–27	W2
68	July 21	Orioles	7–8	American Park	N/A	40–28	L1
-	July 22	Orioles	Postponed (rain); Makeup: July 24				
69	July 23	Orioles	3–2	American Park	N/A	41–28	W1
70	July 24	Orioles	1–5	American Park	N/A	41–29	L1
71	July 26	@ Colonels	4–6	Eclipse Park	N/A	41–30	L2
72	July 28	@ Colonels	1–3	Eclipse Park	N/A	41–31	L3
73	July 29	@ Colonels	4–6	Eclipse Park	N/A	41–32	L4
-	July 31	@ Browns	Postponed (rain); Makeup: August 3				

August: 12–8 (Home: 6–5; Away: 6–3)

#	Date	Opponent	Score	Stadium	Attendance	Record	Streak
74	August 1	@ Browns	4–0	Sportman's Park	N/A	42–32	W1
75	August 2	@ Browns	3–4	Sportman's Park	N/A	42–33	L1
76	August 3	@ Browns	3–1	Sportman's Park	N/A	43–33	W1
77	August 4	Alleghenys	4–1	American Park	N/A	44–33	W2
-	August 5	Alleghenys	Postponed (unknown reason); Makeup: May 3				
-	August 6	Alleghenys	Postponed (rain); Makeup: August 7				
78	August 7	Alleghenys	3–2	American Park	N/A	45–33	W3
79	August 8	Colonels	4–3	American Park	N/A	46–33	W4
80	August 9	Colonels	10–2	American Park	N/A	47–33	W5
81	August 11	Colonels	2–12	American Park	N/A	47–34	L1
82	August 13	@ Browns	3–2	Sportman's Park	N/A	48–34	W1
83	August 15	@ Browns	1–4	Sportman's Park	N/A	48–35	L1
84	August 16	@ Browns	11–3	Sportman's Park	N/A	49–35	W1
85	August 18	@ Colonels	7–9	Eclipse Park	N/A	49–36	L1
86	August 19	@ Colonels	5–4	Eclipse Park	N/A	50–36	W1
87	August 20	@ Colonels	9–1	Eclipse Park	N/A	51–36	W2
88	August 22	Browns	6–8	American Park	N/A	51–37	L1
89	August 23	Browns	1–6	American Park	N/A	51–38	L2
-	August 25	Browns	Postponed (rain); Makeup: August 26				
90	August 26	Browns	1–2	American Park	N/A	51–39	L3
91	August 27	Alleghenys	2–8	American Park	N/A	51–40	L4
92	August 28	Alleghenys	14–6	American Park	N/A	52–40	W1
-	August 29	Alleghenys	Postponed (unknown reason); Makeup: August 28				
93	August 30	Alleghenys	10–0	American Park	N/A	53–40	W2

September/October: 10–9 (Home: 0–0; Away: 10–9)

#	Date	Opponent	Score	Stadium	Attendance	Record	Streak
94	September 2	@ Alleghenys	6–9	Recreation Park	N/A	53–41	L1
95	September 3	@ Alleghenys	6–5	Recreation Park	N/A	54–41	W1
96	September 5	@ Alleghenys	6–2	Recreation Park	N/A	55–41	W2
97	September 8	@ Athletics	7–8	Jefferson Street Grounds	N/A	55–42	L1
-	September 9	@ Athletics	Postponed (rain); Makeup: September 11				
-	September 10	@ Athletics	Postponed (rain); Makeup: September 14				
98	September 11	@ Athletics	3–10	Jefferson Street Grounds	N/A	55–43	L2
99	September 12	@ Athletics	8–3	Jefferson Street Grounds	N/A	56–43	W1
100	September 14	@ Athletics	6–3	Jefferson Street Grounds	N/A	57–43	W2
101	September 15	@ Orioles	1–0	Oriole Park	N/A	58–43	W3
102	September 16	@ Orioles	10–9	Oriole Park	N/A	59–43	W4
103	September 17	@ Orioles	6–4	Oriole Park	N/A	60–43	W5
104	September 19	@ Orioles	6–3	Oriole Park	N/A	61–43	W6
-	September 20	@ Grays	Postponed (unknown reason); Makeup: September 21				
105	September 21	@ Grays	3–6	Washington Park	N/A	61–44	L1
106	September 22	@ Grays	3–2	Washington Park	N/A	62–44	W1
107	September 24	@ Metropolitans	2–5	Polo Grounds	N/A	62–45	L1
108	September 26	@ Metropolitans	2–7	Polo Grounds	N/A	62–46	L2
-	September 27	@ Grays	Postponed (unknown reason); Makeup: September 28				
109	September 28	@ Grays	10–2	Washington Park	N/A	63–46	W1
110	September 29	@ Grays	7–8	Washington Park	N/A	63–47	L1
111	September 30	@ Metropolitans	1–3	Polo Grounds	N/A	63–48	L2
112	October 1	@ Metropolitans	1–5	Polo Grounds	N/A	63–49	L3

=== Notable transactions ===
- July 1, 1885: Jim Keenan jumped to the Red Stockings from the Detroit Wolverines.

=== Roster ===
1885 Cincinnati Red Stockings
Roster
Pitchers: Bill McCaffrey; Larry McKeon; Bill Mountjoy; George Pechiney; Gus Shallix; Will White	Catchers: Kid Baldwin; Jim Keenan; Jimmy Peoples; Phil Powers; Pop Snyder; Infielders: Hick Carpenter; Frank Fennelly; Bid McPhee; John Reilly	Outfielders: Jim Clinton; Pop Corkhill; Charley Jones	Manager: O. P. Caylor

== Player stats ==
=== Batting ===
==== Starters by position ====
Note: Pos = Position; G = Games played; AB = At bats; H = Hits; Avg. = Batting average; HR = Home runs; RBI = Runs batted in

Pos	Player	G	AB	H	Avg.	HR	RBI
C	Pop Snyder	39	152	36	.237	1	19
1B	John Reilly	111	482	143	.297	5	60
2B	Bid McPhee	110	431	114	.265	0	46
3B	Hick Carpenter	112	473	131	.277	2	61
SS	Frank Fennelly	112	454	124	.273	10	89
OF	Charley Jones	112	487	157	.322	5	35
OF	Pop Corkhill	112	440	111	.252	1	53
OF	Jim Clinton	105	408	97	.238	0	34

==== Other batters ====
Note: G = Games played; AB = At bats; H = Hits; Avg. = Batting average; HR = Home runs; RBI = Runs batted in

Player	G	AB	H	Avg.	HR	RBI
Jim Keenan	36	132	35	.265	1	15
Kid Baldwin	34	126	17	.135	1	8
Phil Powers	15	60	16	.267	0	7
Jimmy Peoples	7	22	4	.182	0	1

=== Pitching ===
==== Starting pitchers ====
Note: G = Games pitched; IP = Innings pitched; W = Wins; L = Losses; ERA = Earned run average; SO = Strikeouts

Player	G	IP	W	L	ERA	SO
Will White	34	293.1	18	15	3.53	80
Larry McKeon	33	290.0	20	13	2.86	117
Bill Mountjoy	17	153.2	10	7	3.16	50
Gus Shallix	13	91.1	6	4	3.25	15
George Pechiney	11	98.0	7	4	2.02	49
Jimmy Peoples	2	15.0	0	2	12.00	4
Bill McCaffrey	1	9.0	1	0	6.00	2

==== Other pitchers ====
Note: G = Games pitched; IP = Innings pitched; W = Wins; L = Losses; ERA = Earned run average; SO = Strikeouts

Player	G	IP	W	L	ERA	SO
Kid Baldwin	2	4.0	0	0	9.00	1

==== Relief pitchers ====
Note: G = Games pitched; W = Wins; L = Losses; SV = Saves; ERA = Earned run average; SO = Strikeouts

Player	G	W	L	SV	ERA	SO
Pop Corkhill	8	1	4	1	3.65	12
Jim Keenan	1	0	0	0	1.13	0
