= List of Major League Baseball career passed balls leaders =

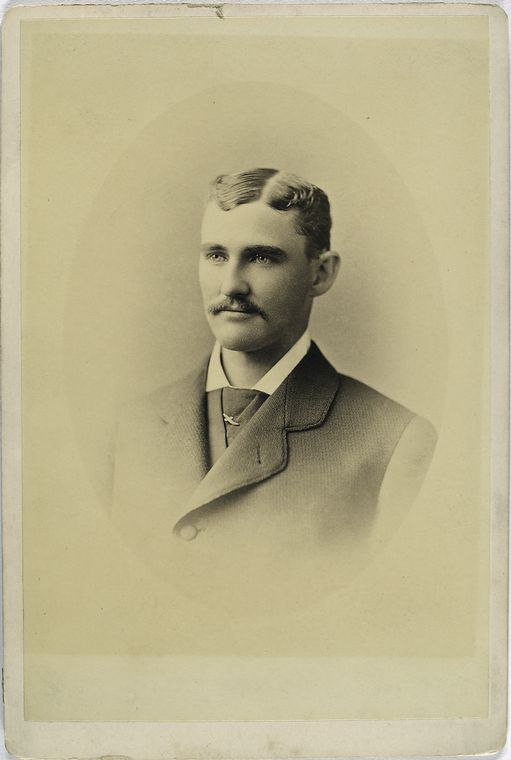
Pop Snyder, the all-time leader in career passed balls

In baseball, a catcher is charged with a passed ball when he fails to hold or control a legally pitched ball that, with ordinary effort, should have been maintained under his control, and, as a result of this loss of control, the batter or a runner on base advances. A runner who advances due to a passed ball is not credited with a stolen base unless he breaks for the base before the pitcher begins his delivery. A passed ball may be scored when a runner on first, second, or third base reaches the next base on a bobble or missed catch by the catcher, or when the batter-runner reaches first base on an uncaught third strike (see also Strikeout).

The list of career leaders is dominated by players from the 19th century, when fielding equipment was very rudimentary; baseball gloves only began to steadily gain acceptance in the 1880s, and were not uniformly worn until the mid-1890s, resulting in a much lower frequency of defensive miscues. Other protective equipment for catchers was also gradually introduced; the first masks were developed in the late 1870s, with improvements in the 1890s, but shin guards were not introduced to the major leagues until 1907. The top 47 players in career passed balls all played primarily in the 19th century, with two-thirds playing their entire careers prior to 1894; only eight were active after 1900, and none were active after 1912.

Pop Snyder, who retired in 1891 with a record 877 games as a catcher, is the all-time leader in passed balls with 763, nearly four times as many as any catcher who began their career after 1915. Silver Flint, who ended his career in 1889, is second with 639, and holds the National League record of 602. Lance Parrish has the most passed balls (192) of any catcher after 1915, and holds the American League record of 158.

== Key ==
Rank	Rank amongst leaders in career passed balls allowed. A blank field indicates a tie.
Player	Name of the player
PB	Total career passed balls allowed
*	Denotes elected to National Baseball Hall of Fame

== List ==
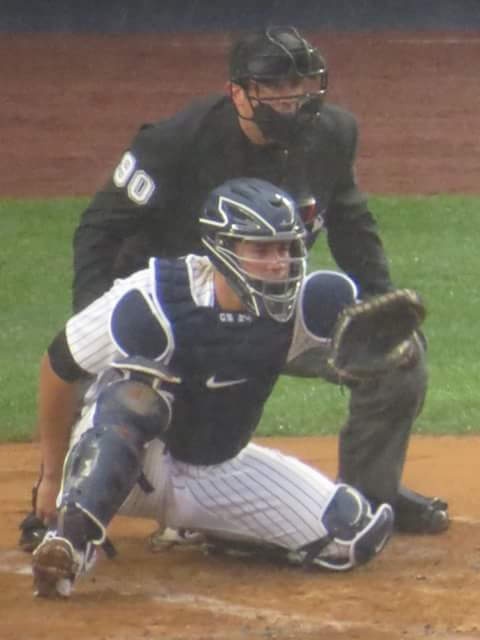
Gary Sanchez, the active leader in passed balls and tied for 215th all-time.

- Stats updated as of June 23, 2026.

Rank	Player	PB
1	Pop Snyder	763
2	Silver Flint	639
3	Doc Bushong	553
4	Deacon White*	505
5	Deacon McGuire	500
6	Wilbert Robinson*	491
7	King Kelly*	420
8	Jack Clements	417
9	Jocko Milligan	406
10	Bill Holbert	403
11	John Clapp	393
12	Barney Gilligan	377
13	Fred Carroll	369
14	Buck Ewing*	360
15	Chief Zimmer	355
16	Charlie Bennett	352
17	Doggie Miller	346
18	Kid Baldwin	331
19	Connie Mack*	310
20	Jack Boyle	303
21	Jack O'Connor	288
22	Duke Farrell	286
23	Jack O'Brien	279
24	Jim Keenan	278
25	Pat Deasley	274
26	Rudy Kemmler	273
27	Paul Cook	257
	Emil Gross	257
	Bill Traffley	257
30	George Myers	256
31	Con Daily	254
32	Sam Trott	249
33	Charlie Reipschlager	245
34	Chris Fulmer	244
35	Fatty Briody	243
36	Jack Rowe	240
37	Lew Brown	236
	Mert Hackett	236
	Ed Whiting	236
40	Dan Sullivan	225
41	Scott Hastings	224
42	Jackie Hayes	218
43	Farmer Vaughn	207
44	Jim O'Rourke*	203
45	Malachi Kittridge	202
46	John Kelly	198
47	Pop Schriver	194
48	Lance Parrish	192
49	Tom Dolan	190
50	Bob Clark	183

Rank	Player	PB
51	Jack Ryan	182
	Ted Simmons*	182
53	Charlie Ganzel	180
	John Kerins	180
55	Ed McFarland	176
56	Jim Donahue	173
57	Nat Hicks	169
58	Jimmy Peoples	168
59	Doug Allison	166
	Frank Bowerman	166
61	Heinie Peitz	163
62	Lave Cross	157
	Mike Hines	157
	Benito Santiago	157
65	Tom Daly	155
66	Dick Higham	152
	Ernie Lombardi*	152
	Sleeper Sullivan	152
69	John Grim	151
70	Jack Warner	147
71	Steve O'Neill	145
72	Bill Harbridge	144
73	Rick Ferrell*	142
	Jorge Posada	142
	Sy Sutcliffe	142
76	Billy Sullivan	140
77	Dick Buckley	139
	Red Dooin	139
	Frankie Hayes	139
80	Gus Triandos	138
81	Frank Ringo	136
82	Phil Powers	135
83	Tom Gunning	133
84	Tim McCarver	132
	Darrell Porter	132
86	Tom Kinslow	131
	Wally Schang	131
88	Jim Sundberg	130
89	Roger Bresnahan*	129
	Carlton Fisk*	129
91	Boileryard Clarke	128
	Pop Tate	128
93	Johnny Kling	127
	Iván Rodríguez*	127
95	Gabby Hartnett*	126
96	Ed Herrmann	125
	Fergy Malone	125
98	Joe Crotty	123
99	Tom Haller	121
	J. C. Martin	121

== Other Hall of Famers ==
Player	PB			Other leagues, notes
Player	MLB	American League	National League	Other leagues, notes
Mike Piazza*	102	0	102	
Ray Schalk*	97	97	0	
Johnny Bench*	94	0	94	
Mickey Cochrane*	88	88	0	
Joe Torre*	87	0	87	
Gary Carter*	84	0	84	
Yogi Berra*	76	76	0	
Bill Dickey*	76	76	0	
Al López*	66	0	66	
Roy Campanella*	64	0	56	Includes 8 in Negro National League (second) (incomplete)

== Sources ==
- Baseball-Reference.com
