= 1885 Baltimore Orioles season =

American baseball team season

1885 Baltimore Orioles
- League: American Association
- Ballpark: Oriole Park
- City: Silver Spring, Maryland
- Record: 41–68 (.376)
- League place: 8th
- Owner: Harry Von der Horst
- Manager: Billy Barnie

== Regular season ==
=== Season standings ===
American Association
Team	W	L	Pct.	GB	Home	Road
St. Louis Browns	79	33	.705	—	44‍–‍11	35‍–‍22
Cincinnati Red Stockings	63	49	.562	16	35‍–‍21	28‍–‍28
Pittsburgh Alleghenys	56	55	.505	22½	37‍–‍19	19‍–‍36
Philadelphia Athletics	55	57	.491	24	33‍–‍23	22‍–‍34
Brooklyn Grays	53	59	.473	26	35‍–‍22	18‍–‍37
Louisville Colonels	53	59	.473	26	37‍–‍19	16‍–‍40
New York Metropolitans	44	64	.407	33	28‍–‍24	16‍–‍40
Baltimore Orioles	41	68	.376	36½	29‍–‍26	12‍–‍42

=== Record vs. opponents ===
1885 American Association record Sources:
Team	BAL	BRO	CIN	LOU	NYM	PHA	PIT	STL
Baltimore	—	7–9	6–10	7–9	7–6	6–10–1	6–10	2–14
Brooklyn	9–7	—	5–11	10–6	8–8	11–5	6–10	4–12
Cincinnati	10–6	11–5	—	8–8	10–6	9–7	9–7	6–10
Louisville	9–7	6–10	8–8	—	9–7	8–8	6–10	7–9
New York	6–7	8–8	6–10	7–9	—	5–11	8–7	4–12
Philadelphia	10–6–1	5–11	7–9	8–8	11–5	—	10–6	4–12
Pittsburgh	10–6	10–6	7–9	10–6	7–8	6–10	—	6–10
St. Louis	14–2	12–4	10–6	9–7	12–4	12–4	10–6	—

=== Roster ===
1885 Baltimore Orioles
Roster
Pitchers: Joe Brown; Bob Emslie; Frank Foreman; Hardie Henderson; John Henry; Bill Mountjoy; George Wetzel; Catchers: Gene Derby; Sandy Nava; Phil Powers; Bill Traffley; Sam Trott	Infielders: Jim Field; Gid Gardner; Harry Jacoby; Charlie Levis; Jimmy Macullar; Tim Manning; George Mappes; Sandy McDermott; Mike Muldoon; Tom O'Brien; Dan Stearns	Outfielders: Oyster Burns; Dennis Casey; Jake Evans; Ed Greer; Joe Sommer; John Tener; Joe Visner; Oscar Walker; Tom York	Manager: Billy Barnie

== Player stats ==
=== Batting ===
==== Starters by position ====
Note: Pos = Position; G = Games played; AB = At bats; H = Hits; Avg. = Batting average; HR = Home runs; RBI = Runs batted in

Pos	Player	G	AB	H	Avg.	HR	RBI
C	Bill Traffley	69	254	39	.154	1	20
1B	Dan Stearns	67	253	47	.186	1	29
2B	Tim Manning	43	157	32	.204	0	16
SS	Jimmy Macullar	100	320	61	.191	3	26
3B	Mike Muldoon	102	410	103	.251	2	52
OF	Dennis Casey	63	264	76	.288	3	29
OF	Joe Sommer	110	471	118	.251	1	44
OF	Ed Greer	56	211	42	.199	0	21

==== Other batters ====
Note: G = Games played; AB = At bats; H = Hits; Avg. = Batting average; HR = Home runs; RBI = Runs batted in

Player	G	AB	H	Avg.	HR	RBI
Oyster Burns	78	321	74	.231	5	37
Gid Gardner	44	170	37	.218	0	17
Jim Field	38	144	30	.208	0	10
Sam Trott	21	88	24	.273	0	12
Tom York	22	87	23	.264	0	12
Jake Evans	20	77	17	.221	0	7
Harry Jacoby	11	43	6	.140	0	1
Phil Powers	9	34	4	.118	0	2
Tom O'Brien	8	33	7	.212	0	5
Gene Derby	10	31	4	.129	0	2
Sandy Nava	8	27	5	.185	0	4
George Mappes	6	19	4	.211	0	0
Joe Visner	4	13	3	.231	0	2
Oscar Walker	4	13	0	.000	0	1
Charlie Levis	1	4	1	.250	0	0
John Tener	1	4	0	.000	0	0
Sandy McDermott	1	0	0	----	0	0

=== Pitching ===
==== Starting pitchers ====
Note: G = Games pitched; IP = Innings pitched; W = Wins; L = Losses; ERA = Earned run average; SO = Strikeouts

Player	G	IP	W	L	ERA	SO
Hardie Henderson	61	539.1	25	35	3.19	263
Bob Emslie	13	107.0	3	10	4.29	27
John Henry	9	71.0	2	7	4.31	31
Bill Mountjoy	6	53.0	2	4	5.43	15
Joe Brown	4	38.0	0	4	5.68	9
Frank Foreman	3	27.0	2	1	6.00	11
George Wetzel	2	17.0	0	2	8.47	6
Gid Gardner	1	9.0	0	1	10.00	3

==== Other pitchers ====
Note: G = Games pitched; IP = Innings pitched; W = Wins; L = Losses; ERA = Earned run average; SO = Strikeouts

Player	G	IP	W	L	ERA	SO
Oyster Burns	15	105.2	7	4	3.58	30

==== Relief pitchers ====
Note: G = Games pitched; IP = Innings pitched; W = Wins; L = Losses; ERA = Earned run average; SO = Strikeouts

Player	G	W	L	SV	ERA	SO
Joe Sommer	2	0	0	1	9.00	0
Jimmy Macullar	1	0	0	0	0.00	0
