= 1885 Brooklyn Grays season =

1885 Brooklyn Grays
- League: American Association
- Ballpark: Washington Park
- City: Brooklyn, New York
- Record: 53–59 (.473)
- League place: T–5th
- Owners: Charles Byrne, Ferdinand Abell
- President: Charles Byrne
- Managers: Charlie Hackett, Charlie Byrne

The 1885 Brooklyn Grays finished the season in fifth place. The team added several players from the defunct Cleveland Blues team after team owner Charlie Byrne bought the Blues assets for $10,000 after the 1884 season.

== Offseason ==
- Prior to 1885 season: Ed Swartwood was purchased by the Grays from the Pittsburgh Alleghenys.
- January 3, 1885: Doc Bushong was purchased by the Grays from the Cleveland Blues, and subsequently assigned to the St. Louis Browns.
- January 3, 1885: John Harkins, Pete Hotaling, Bill Krieg, Bill Phillips, George Pinkney and Germany Smith were purchased by the Grays from the Cleveland Blues.
- January 15, 1885: Bill McClellan was purchased by the Grays from the Philadelphia Phillies.

== Regular season ==
=== Season standings ===
American Association
Team	W	L	Pct.	GB	Home	Road
St. Louis Browns	79	33	.705	—	44‍–‍11	35‍–‍22
Cincinnati Red Stockings	63	49	.562	16	35‍–‍21	28‍–‍28
Pittsburgh Alleghenys	56	55	.505	22½	37‍–‍19	19‍–‍36
Philadelphia Athletics	55	57	.491	24	33‍–‍23	22‍–‍34
Brooklyn Grays	53	59	.473	26	35‍–‍22	18‍–‍37
Louisville Colonels	53	59	.473	26	37‍–‍19	16‍–‍40
New York Metropolitans	44	64	.407	33	28‍–‍24	16‍–‍40
Baltimore Orioles	41	68	.376	36½	29‍–‍26	12‍–‍42

=== Record vs. opponents ===
1885 American Association record Sources:
Team	BAL	BRO	CIN	LOU	NYM	PHA	PIT	STL
Baltimore	—	7–9	6–10	7–9	7–6	6–10–1	6–10	2–14
Brooklyn	9–7	—	5–11	10–6	8–8	11–5	6–10	4–12
Cincinnati	10–6	11–5	—	8–8	10–6	9–7	9–7	6–10
Louisville	9–7	6–10	8–8	—	9–7	8–8	6–10	7–9
New York	6–7	8–8	6–10	7–9	—	5–11	8–7	4–12
Philadelphia	10–6–1	5–11	7–9	8–8	11–5	—	10–6	4–12
Pittsburgh	10–6	10–6	7–9	10–6	7–8	6–10	—	6–10
St. Louis	14–2	12–4	10–6	9–7	12–4	12–4	10–6	—

=== Roster ===
1885 Brooklyn Grays
Roster
Pitchers: John Harkins; Henry Porter; Phenomenal Smith; Catchers: Frank Bell; Jackie Hayes; Mike Hines; Bill Krieg; Dave Oldfield; Jimmy Peoples; Charlie Robinson	Infielders: Bill McClellan; George McVey; Bill Phillips; George Pinkney; Bill Schenck; Germany Smith	Outfielders: John Cassidy; Pete Hotaling; Jim McTamany; Ed Swartwood; Adonis Terry	Managers: Charlie Byrne; Charlie Hackett

== Player stats ==
=== Batting ===
==== Starters by position ====
Note: Pos = Position; G = Games played; AB = At bats; R = Runs scored; H = Hits; Avg. = Batting average; HR = Home runs; RBI = Runs batted in

Pos	Player	G	AB	R	H	Avg.	HR	RBI
C	Jackie Hayes	42	137	10	18	.131	0	10
1B	Bill Phillips	99	391	65	118	.302	3	63
2B	George Pinkney	110	447	77	124	.277	0	42
3B	Bill McClellan	112	464	85	124	.267	0	46
SS	Germany Smith	108	419	62	108	.258	4	62
OF	Ed Swartwood	99	399	80	106	.266	0	49
OF	Pete Hotaling	94	370	73	95	.257	1	34
OF	John Cassidy	54	221	36	47	.213	1	28

==== Other batters ====
Note: G = Games played; AB = At bats; R = Runs scored; H = Hits; Avg. = Batting average; HR = Home runs; RBI = Runs batted in

Player	G	AB	R	H	Avg.	HR	RBI
Adonis Terry	71	264	23	45	.170	1	20
Jimmy Peoples	41	151	21	30	.199	1	15
Jim McTamany	35	131	21	36	.275	1	13
Bill Krieg	17	60	7	9	.150	1	5
Charlie Robinson	11	40	5	6	.150	0	4
Frank Bell	10	29	5	5	.172	0	2
Dave Oldfield	10	25	2	8	.320	0	2
George McVey	6	21	2	3	.143	0	1
Mike Hines	3	13	1	1	.077	0	1
Bill Schenck	1	4	0	0	.000	0	0

=== Pitching ===
==== Starting pitchers ====
Note: G = Games pitched; GS = Games started; IP = Innings pitched; W = Wins; L = Losses; ERA = Earned run average; BB = Walks allowed; SO = Strikeouts; CG = Complete games

Player	G	GS	IP	W	L	ERA	BB	SO	CG
Henry Porter	54	54	481.7	33	21	2.78	107	197	53
John Harkins	34	34	293.0	14	20	3.75	56	141	33
Adonis Terry	25	23	209.0	6	17	4.26	42	96	23
Phenomenal Smith	1	1	8.0	0	1	12.38	6	2	1
