= 1885 St. Louis Browns season =

Major League Baseball season

1885 St. Louis Browns
- American Association Champions
- League: American Association
- Ballpark: Sportsman's Park
- City: St. Louis, Missouri
- Record: 79–33 (.705)
- League place: 1st
- Owner: Chris von der Ahe
- Manager: Charlie Comiskey
- Stats: ESPN.com; Baseball Reference

The 1885 St. Louis Browns season was the team's fourth season in St. Louis, Missouri, and the fourth season in the American Association. The Browns went 79–33 during the season, best in the American Association, and won their first AA pennant. In the World Series, the Browns played the National League champion Chicago White Stockings. The series ended in dispute, with each club winning 3 games with 1 tie.

== Regular season ==
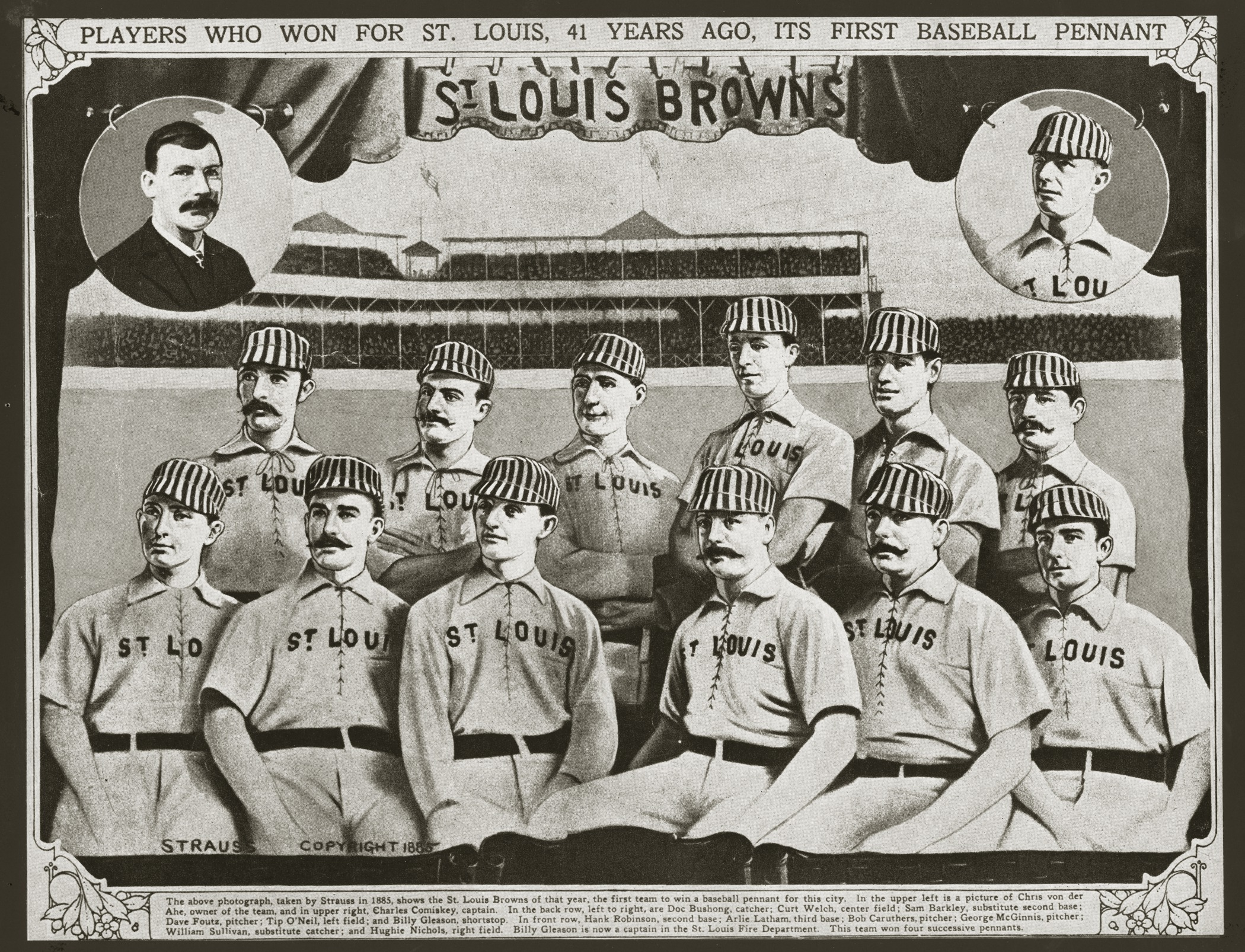
1885 St. Louis Browns

Manager Charlie Comiskey finally was able to assemble and direct a team from start to finish the way he wanted. The result: a runaway championship.

The team was built on daring baserunning, clutch hitting, and the best pitching in the league. The team as a whole led the league in both earned run average (ERA) and overall runs allowed by a healthy margin over second-best Louisville. Individually, Dave Foutz was outstanding, as he won 33 of the 46 games he started and ranked fifth in ERA. His teammate Bob Caruthers was even better, compiling league-leading totals in wins (40), ERA (2.07) and winning percentage (a stellar .755).

The Browns took over first place to stay in the second week of May, but they made a joke of the race in July. On successive home stands, they had winning streaks of 17 and 12 games, combining for a major-league record 27-game winning streak at home that still stands as the best ever. They finished games laps ahead of the second-place Cincinnati Red Stockings and earned a berth in the World Series against the National League champion Chicago White Stockings.

=== Season standings ===
American Association
Team	W	L	Pct.	GB	Home	Road
St. Louis Browns	79	33	.705	—	44‍–‍11	35‍–‍22
Cincinnati Red Stockings	63	49	.562	16	35‍–‍21	28‍–‍28
Pittsburgh Alleghenys	56	55	.505	22½	37‍–‍19	19‍–‍36
Philadelphia Athletics	55	57	.491	24	33‍–‍23	22‍–‍34
Brooklyn Grays	53	59	.473	26	35‍–‍22	18‍–‍37
Louisville Colonels	53	59	.473	26	37‍–‍19	16‍–‍40
New York Metropolitans	44	64	.407	33	28‍–‍24	16‍–‍40
Baltimore Orioles	41	68	.376	36½	29‍–‍26	12‍–‍42

=== Record vs. opponents ===
1885 American Association record Sources:
Team	BAL	BRO	CIN	LOU	NYM	PHA	PIT	STL
Baltimore	—	7–9	6–10	7–9	7–6	6–10–1	6–10	2–14
Brooklyn	9–7	—	5–11	10–6	8–8	11–5	6–10	4–12
Cincinnati	10–6	11–5	—	8–8	10–6	9–7	9–7	6–10
Louisville	9–7	6–10	8–8	—	9–7	8–8	6–10	7–9
New York	6–7	8–8	6–10	7–9	—	5–11	8–7	4–12
Philadelphia	10–6–1	5–11	7–9	8–8	11–5	—	10–6	4–12
Pittsburgh	10–6	10–6	7–9	10–6	7–8	6–10	—	6–10
St. Louis	14–2	12–4	10–6	9–7	12–4	12–4	10–6	—

=== Roster ===
1885 St. Louis Browns
Roster
Pitchers: Bob Caruthers; Dave Foutz; Jumbo McGinnis	Catchers: Cal Broughton; Doc Bushong; Mike Drissel; Dan Sullivan; Infielders: Sam Barkley; Charlie Comiskey; Bill Gleason; Arlie Latham	Outfielders: Hugh Nicol; Tip O'Neill; Yank Robinson; Curt Welch	Manager: Charles Comiskey

== Player stats ==
=== Batting ===
==== Starters by position ====
Note: Pos = Position; G = Games played; AB = At bats; H = Hits; Avg. = Batting average; HR = Home runs; RBI = Runs batted in

Pos	Player	G	AB	H	Avg.	HR	RBI
C	Doc Bushong	85	300	80	.267	0	21
1B	Charlie Comiskey	83	340	87	.256	2	44
2B	Sam Barkley	106	418	112	.268	3	53
SS	Bill Gleason	112	472	119	.252	3	53
3B	Arlie Latham	110	485	100	.206	1	35
OF	Curt Welch	112	432	117	.271	3	69
OF	Yank Robinson	78	287	75	.261	0	35
OF	Hugh Nicol	112	425	88	.207	0	45

==== Other batters ====
Note: G = Games played; AB = At bats; H = Hits; Avg. = Batting average; HR = Home runs; RBI = Runs batted in

Player	G	AB	H	Avg.	HR	RBI
Tip O'Neill	52	206	72	.350	3	38
Dan Sullivan	17	60	7	.117	0	3
Mike Drissel	6	20	1	.050	0	0
Cal Broughton	4	17	1	.059	0	1

=== Pitching ===
==== Starting pitchers ====
Note: G = Games pitched; IP = Innings pitched; W = Wins; L = Losses; ERA = Earned run average; SO = Strikeouts

Player	G	IP	W	L	ERA	SO
Bob Caruthers	53	482.1	40	13	2.07	190
Dave Foutz	47	407.2	33	14	2.63	147
Jumbo McGinnis	13	112.0	6	6	3.38	41

== World Series ==
- Game 1 (October 14): Darkness ends game one after 8 innings‚ with the teams tied 5–5.
- Game 2 (October 15): With Chicago leading 5–4 in the sixth inning, Browns manager Charles Comiskey calls his team off the field to protest a ruling made by umpire Dave Sullivan. The game is forfeited to Chicago.
- Game 6 (October 23): The series moves from Pittsburgh to Cincinnati‚ setting a record for the series played in the most cities. (It was also played in New York and St. Louis.) Chicago takes a 3–2 series lead by beating the Browns 9–2.
- Game 7 (October 24): Behind pitcher Dave Foutz, St. Louis defeats Chicago 13–4 in the 7th and last game. The Browns claim the game 2 forfeit didn't count and therefore claim the championship. The two clubs split the $1000 prize.
