= 1885 Louisville Colonels season =

1885 Louisville Colonels
- League: American Association
- Ballpark: Eclipse Park
- City: Louisville, Kentucky
- Record: 53–59 (.473)
- League place: T–5th
- Owners: W. L. Lyons, Zach Phelps, W. L. Jackson, John Phelps
- Manager: Jim Hart

The 1885 Louisville Colonels season was a season in American baseball. The team (formerly the Louisville Eclipse) finished with a 53–59 record, tied for fifth place in the American Association.

== Regular season ==
=== Season standings ===
American Association
Team	W	L	Pct.	GB	Home	Road
St. Louis Browns	79	33	.705	—	44‍–‍11	35‍–‍22
Cincinnati Red Stockings	63	49	.562	16	35‍–‍21	28‍–‍28
Pittsburgh Alleghenys	56	55	.505	22½	37‍–‍19	19‍–‍36
Philadelphia Athletics	55	57	.491	24	33‍–‍23	22‍–‍34
Brooklyn Grays	53	59	.473	26	35‍–‍22	18‍–‍37
Louisville Colonels	53	59	.473	26	37‍–‍19	16‍–‍40
New York Metropolitans	44	64	.407	33	28‍–‍24	16‍–‍40
Baltimore Orioles	41	68	.376	36½	29‍–‍26	12‍–‍42

=== Record vs. opponents ===
1885 American Association record Sources:
Team	BAL	BRO	CIN	LOU	NYM	PHA	PIT	STL
Baltimore	—	7–9	6–10	7–9	7–6	6–10–1	6–10	2–14
Brooklyn	9–7	—	5–11	10–6	8–8	11–5	6–10	4–12
Cincinnati	10–6	11–5	—	8–8	10–6	9–7	9–7	6–10
Louisville	9–7	6–10	8–8	—	9–7	8–8	6–10	7–9
New York	6–7	8–8	6–10	7–9	—	5–11	8–7	4–12
Philadelphia	10–6–1	5–11	7–9	8–8	11–5	—	10–6	4–12
Pittsburgh	10–6	10–6	7–9	10–6	7–8	6–10	—	6–10
St. Louis	14–2	12–4	10–6	9–7	12–4	12–4	10–6	—

=== Roster ===
1885 Louisville Colonels
Roster
Pitchers: Norm Baker; John Connor; Guy Hecker; Al Mays; Toad Ramsey	Catchers: Amos Cross; Joe Crotty; Charlie Krehmeyer; Miah Murray; Dan Sullivan; Infielders: Billy Geer; John Kerins; Reddy Mack; Tom McLaughlin; Joe Miller; Phil Reccius	Outfielders: Pete Browning; Monk Cline; Leech Maskrey; Joe Strauss; Jimmy Wolf	Manager: Jim Hart

== Player stats ==
=== Batting ===
==== Starters by position ====
Note: Pos = Position; G = Games played; AB = At bats; H = Hits; Avg. = Batting average; HR = Home runs; RBI = Runs batted in

Pos	Player	G	AB	H	Avg.	HR	RBI
C	Joe Crotty	39	129	20	.155	0	7
1B	John Kerins	112	456	111	.243	3	51
2B	Tom McLaughlin	112	411	87	.212	2	41
3B	Phil Reccius	102	402	97	.241	1	38
SS	Joe Miller	98	339	62	.183	0	24
OF	Jimmy Wolf	112	483	141	.292	1	52
OF	Leech Maskrey	109	423	97	.229	1	46
OF	Pete Browning	112	481	174	.362	9	73

==== Other batters ====
Note: G = Games played; AB = At bats; H = Hits; Avg. = Batting average; HR = Home runs; RBI = Runs batted in

Player	G	AB	H	Avg.	HR	RBI
Amos Cross	35	130	37	.285	0	14
Billy Geer	14	51	6	.118	0	3
Dan Sullivan	13	44	8	.182	0	4
Miah Murray	12	43	8	.186	0	3
Reddy Mack	11	41	10	.244	0	5
Charlie Krehmeyer	7	31	7	.226	0	5
Monk Cline	2	9	2	.222	0	2
Joe Strauss	2	6	1	.167	0	0

=== Pitching ===
==== Starting pitchers ====
Note: G = Games pitched; IP = Innings pitched; W = Wins; L = Losses; ERA = Earned run average; SO = Strikeouts

Player	G	IP	W	L	ERA	SO
Guy Hecker	53	480.0	30	23	2.17	209
Norm Baker	25	217.0	13	12	3.40	79
Al Mays	17	150.0	6	11	2.76	61
Toad Ramsey	9	79.0	3	6	1.94	83
John Connor	4	35.0	1	3	4.89	19

==== Other pitchers ====
Note: G = Games pitched; IP = Innings pitched; W = Wins; L = Losses; ERA = Earned run average; SO = Strikeouts

Player	G	IP	W	L	ERA	SO
Phil Reccius	7	40.0	0	4	3.83	10

==== Relief pitchers ====
Note: G = Games pitched; W = Wins; L = Losses; SV = Saves; ERA = Earned run average; SO = Strikeouts

Player	G	W	L	SV	ERA	SO
Jimmy Wolf	1	0	0	0	9.00	1
