= 1885 Pittsburgh Alleghenys season =

1885 Pittsburgh Alleghenys
- League: American Association
- Ballpark: Recreation Park
- City: Allegheny, Pennsylvania
- Record: 56–55 (.505)
- League place: 3rd
- Owner: Denny McKnight
- Manager: Horace Phillips

The 1885 Pittsburgh Alleghenys season was the fourth season of the Pittsburgh Alleghenys franchise. The Alleghenys finished third in the American Association with a record of 56–55.

== Offseason ==
- October 30, 1884: Ed Morris, Tom Brown, Fred Carroll, Jim Field, Rudy Kemmler, Bill Kuehne, Fred Mann, Frank Mountain, John Richmond and Pop Smith were purchased by the Alleghenys from the defunct Columbus Buckeyes.

== Regular season ==
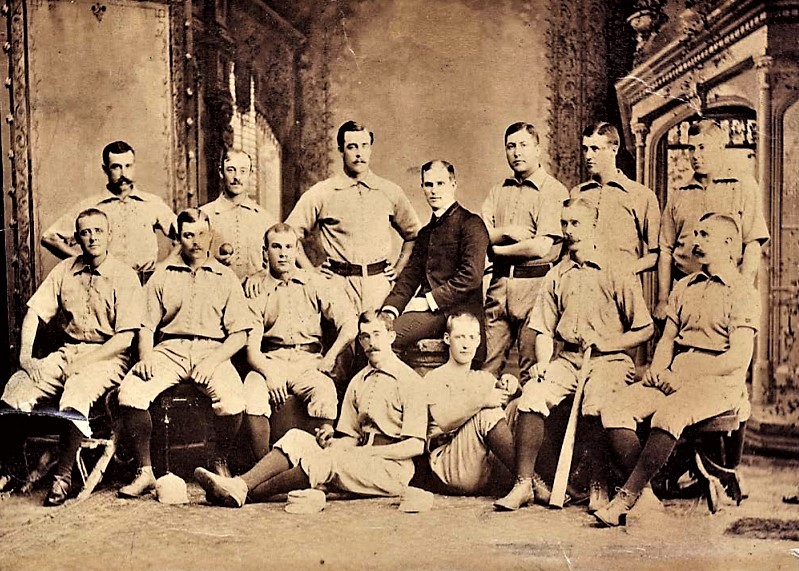
1885 Pittsburgh Alleghenys

=== Season standings ===
American Association
Team	W	L	Pct.	GB	Home	Road
St. Louis Browns	79	33	.705	—	44‍–‍11	35‍–‍22
Cincinnati Red Stockings	63	49	.562	16	35‍–‍21	28‍–‍28
Pittsburgh Alleghenys	56	55	.505	22½	37‍–‍19	19‍–‍36
Philadelphia Athletics	55	57	.491	24	33‍–‍23	22‍–‍34
Brooklyn Grays	53	59	.473	26	35‍–‍22	18‍–‍37
Louisville Colonels	53	59	.473	26	37‍–‍19	16‍–‍40
New York Metropolitans	44	64	.407	33	28‍–‍24	16‍–‍40
Baltimore Orioles	41	68	.376	36½	29‍–‍26	12‍–‍42

=== Record vs. opponents ===
1885 American Association record Sources:
Team	BAL	BRO	CIN	LOU	NYM	PHA	PIT	STL
Baltimore	—	7–9	6–10	7–9	7–6	6–10–1	6–10	2–14
Brooklyn	9–7	—	5–11	10–6	8–8	11–5	6–10	4–12
Cincinnati	10–6	11–5	—	8–8	10–6	9–7	9–7	6–10
Louisville	9–7	6–10	8–8	—	9–7	8–8	6–10	7–9
New York	6–7	8–8	6–10	7–9	—	5–11	8–7	4–12
Philadelphia	10–6–1	5–11	7–9	8–8	11–5	—	10–6	4–12
Pittsburgh	10–6	10–6	7–9	10–6	7–8	6–10	—	6–10
St. Louis	14–2	12–4	10–6	9–7	12–4	12–4	10–6	—

=== Game log ===
1885 Game Log
April: 4–5 (Home: 1–1; Away: 3–4)

#	Date	Opponent	Score	Record
1	Saturday, Apr 18	@ St. Louis Browns	7–0	1–0
2	Sunday, Apr 19	@ St. Louis Browns	0–3	1–1
3	Tuesday, Apr 21	@ Louisville Colonels	4–3	2–1
4	Wednesday, Apr 22	@ Louisville Colonels	0–11	2–2
5	Friday, Apr 24	@ Cincinnati Red Stockings	7–6	3–2
6	Saturday, Apr 25	@ Cincinnati Red Stockings	2–8	3–3
7	Sunday, Apr 26	@ St. Louis Browns	0–2	3–4
8	Tuesday, Apr 28	Louisville Colonels	4–0	4–4
9	Wednesday, Apr 29	Louisville Colonels	3–4	4–5

May: 15–7 (Home: 15–5; Away: 0–2)

#	Date	Opponent	Score	Record
10	Saturday, May 2	St. Louis Browns	3–2	5–5
11	Sunday, May 3	@ Cincinnati Red Stockings	6–7	5–6
12	Monday, May 4	@ Cincinnati Red Stockings	0–3	5–7
13	Tuesday, May 5	Cincinnati Red Stockings	8–1	6–7
14	Thursday, May 7	New York Metropolitans	1–3	6–8
15	Friday, May 8	New York Metropolitans	13–3	7–8
16	Saturday, May 9	New York Metropolitans	16–3	8–8
17	Monday, May 11	New York Metropolitans	13–4	9–8
18	Tuesday, May 12	Brooklyn Grays	8–4	10–8
19	Wednesday, May 13	Brooklyn Grays	2–6	10–9
20	Thursday, May 14	Brooklyn Grays	5–2	11–9
21	Saturday, May 16	Brooklyn Grays	13–4	12–9
22	Monday, May 18	Philadelphia Athletics	0–7	12–10
23	Tuesday, May 19	Philadelphia Athletics	11–8	13–10
24	Wednesday, May 20	Philadelphia Athletics	9–8	14–10
25	Thursday, May 21	Philadelphia Athletics	8–3	15–10
26	Saturday, May 23	Baltimore Orioles	5–0	16–10
27	Monday, May 25	Baltimore Orioles	7–3	17–10
28	Tuesday, May 26	Baltimore Orioles	2–1	18–10
29	Wednesday, May 27	Baltimore Orioles	6–2	19–10
30	Saturday, May 30	New York Metropolitans	6–8	19–11
31	Saturday, May 30	New York Metropolitans	2–6	19–12

June: 10–11 (Home: 4–4; Away: 6–7)

#	Date	Opponent	Score	Record
32	Thursday, Jun 4	@ Brooklyn Grays	5–4	20–12
33	Friday, Jun 5	@ Brooklyn Grays	3–2	21–12
34	Saturday, Jun 6	@ Brooklyn Grays	2–13	21–13
35	Monday, Jun 8	@ Brooklyn Grays	2–0	22–13
36	Tuesday, Jun 9	@ New York Metropolitans	2–10	22–14
37	Wednesday, Jun 10	@ Baltimore Orioles	5–10	22–15
38	Thursday, Jun 11	@ Baltimore Orioles	12–8	23–15
39	Friday, Jun 12	@ Baltimore Orioles	3–2	24–15
40	Saturday, Jun 13	@ Baltimore Orioles	10–11	24–16
41	Tuesday, Jun 16	@ Philadelphia Athletics	1–14	24–17
42	Wednesday, Jun 17	@ Philadelphia Athletics	9–7	25–17
43	Thursday, Jun 18	@ Philadelphia Athletics	5–6	25–18
44	Saturday, Jun 20	@ Philadelphia Athletics	3–10	25–19
45	Monday, Jun 22	St. Louis Browns	2–6	25–20
46	Tuesday, Jun 23	St. Louis Browns	6–7	25–21
47	Wednesday, Jun 24	St. Louis Browns	6–7	25–22
48	Thursday, Jun 25	St. Louis Browns	6–1	26–22
49	Friday, Jun 26	Louisville Colonels	7–5	27–22
50	Saturday, Jun 27	Louisville Colonels	4–3	28–22
51	Monday, Jun 29	Louisville Colonels	3–4	28–23
52	Tuesday, Jun 30	Cincinnati Red Stockings	9–4	29–23

July: 14–6 (Home: 12–5; Away: 2–1)

#	Date	Opponent	Score	Record
53	Wednesday, Jul 1	Cincinnati Red Stockings	11–9	30–23
54	Thursday, Jul 2	Cincinnati Red Stockings	6–4	31–23
55	Saturday, Jul 4	Philadelphia Athletics	4–8	31–24
56	Saturday, Jul 4	Philadelphia Athletics	6–11	31–25
57	Monday, Jul 6	Philadelphia Athletics	0–8	31–26
58	Tuesday, Jul 7	Philadelphia Athletics	5–1	32–26
59	Thursday, Jul 9	New York Metropolitans	17–0	33–26
60	Friday, Jul 10	New York Metropolitans	5–7	33–27
61	Saturday, Jul 11	New York Metropolitans	2–0	34–27
62	Tuesday, Jul 14	Baltimore Orioles	2–5	34–28
63	Wednesday, Jul 15	Baltimore Orioles	5–0	35–28
64	Thursday, Jul 16	Baltimore Orioles	12–1	36–28
65	Saturday, Jul 18	Baltimore Orioles	6–1	37–28
66	Monday, Jul 20	Brooklyn Grays	4–3	38–28
67	Tuesday, Jul 21	Brooklyn Grays	7–5	39–28
68	Wednesday, Jul 22	Brooklyn Grays	5–3	40–28
69	Thursday, Jul 23	Brooklyn Grays	6–5	41–28
70	Saturday, Jul 25	@ St. Louis Browns	2–1	42–28
71	Sunday, Jul 26	@ St. Louis Browns	1–8	42–29
72	Friday, Jul 31	@ Louisville Colonels	8–2	43–29

April: 8–11 (Home: 4–2; Away: 4–9)

#	Date	Opponent	Score	Record
73	Saturday, Aug 1	@ Louisville Colonels	5–7	43–30
74	Sunday, Aug 2	@ Louisville Colonels	1–4	43–31
75	Tuesday, Aug 4	@ Cincinnati Red Stockings	1–4	43–32
76	Friday, Aug 7	@ Cincinnati Red Stockings	2–3	43–33
77	Saturday, Aug 8	@ St. Louis Browns	0–7	43–34
78	Sunday, Aug 9	@ St. Louis Browns	6–3	44–34
79	Tuesday, Aug 11	@ St. Louis Browns	1–3	44–35
80	Thursday, Aug 13	@ Louisville Colonels	2–1	45–35
81	Saturday, Aug 15	@ Louisville Colonels	7–2	46–35
82	Sunday, Aug 16	@ Louisville Colonels	10–11	46–36
83	Tuesday, Aug 18	St. Louis Browns	1–3	46–37
84	Wednesday, Aug 19	St. Louis Browns	4–6	46–38
85	Thursday, Aug 20	St. Louis Browns	11–10	47–38
86	Saturday, Aug 22	Louisville Colonels	3–2	48–38
87	Monday, Aug 24	Louisville Colonels	9–5	49–38
88	Wednesday, Aug 26	Louisville Colonels	7–5	50–38
89	Thursday, Aug 27	@ Cincinnati Red Stockings	8–2	51–38
90	Friday, Aug 28	@ Cincinnati Red Stockings	6–14	51–39
91	Sunday, Aug 30	@ Cincinnati Red Stockings	0–10	51–40

September: 5–14 (Home: 1–2; Away: 4–12)

#	Date	Opponent	Score	Record
92	Wednesday, Sep 2	Cincinnati Red Stockings	9–6	52–40
93	Thursday, Sep 3	Cincinnati Red Stockings	5–6	52–41
94	Saturday, Sep 5	Cincinnati Red Stockings	2–6	52–42
95	Tuesday, Sep 8	@ New York Metropolitans	4–2	53–42
96	Wednesday, Sep 9	@ New York Metropolitans	2–3	53–43
97	Friday, Sep 11	@ Brooklyn Grays	0–3	53–44
98	Saturday, Sep 12	@ Brooklyn Grays	1–4	53–45
99	Tuesday, Sep 15	@ New York Metropolitans	1–0	54–45
100	Wednesday, Sep 16	@ New York Metropolitans	1–5	54–46
101	Thursday, Sep 17	@ Brooklyn Grays	1–2	54–47
102	Friday, Sep 18	@ New York Metropolitans	8–9	54–48
103	Saturday, Sep 19	@ Brooklyn Grays	2–8	54–49
104	Wednesday, Sep 23	@ Baltimore Orioles	11–3	55–49
105	Thursday, Sep 24	@ Baltimore Orioles	2–4	55–50
106	Friday, Sep 25	@ Baltimore Orioles	5–10	55–51
107	Saturday, Sep 26	@ Baltimore Orioles	4–5	55–52
108	Monday, Sep 28	@ Philadelphia Athletics	4–6	55–53
109	Tuesday, Sep 29	@ Philadelphia Athletics	6–3	56–53
110	Wednesday, Sep 30	@ Philadelphia Athletics	2–5	56–54

October: 0–1 (Home: 0–0; Away: 0–1)

#	Date	Opponent	Score	Record
111	Thursday, Oct 1	@ Philadelphia Athletics	3–4	56–55

Legend: = Win = Loss

== Roster ==
1885 Pittsburgh Alleghenys roster
Pitchers: Pud Galvin; John Hofford; Pete Meegan; Ed Morris; Frank Mountain; Hank O'Day	Catchers: Fred Carroll; Rudy Kemmler; Doggie Miller; Frank Ringo; Infielders: Jim Field; Bill Kuehne; Marr Phillips; John Richmond; Milt Scott; Pop Smith; Art Whitney	Outfielders: Tom Brown; Charlie Eden; Fred Mann	Manager: Horace Phillips

== Player stats ==
Batters

Note: G = Games played; AB = At bats; H = Hits; Avg. = Batting average; HR = Home runs; RBI = Runs batted in

Regular Season
Player	G	AB	H	Avg.	HR	RBI
Tom Brown	108	437	134	0.307	4	68
Fred Carroll	71	280	75	0.268	0	30
Marr Phillips	4	15	4	0.267	0	2
Charlie Eden	98	405	103	0.254	0	38
Fred Mann	99	391	99	0.253	0	41
Pop Smith	106	453	113	0.249	0	35
Milt Scott	55	210	52	0.248	0	18
Hank O'Day	13	49	12	0.245	0	3
Jim Field	56	209	50	0.239	1	15
Art Whitney	90	373	87	0.233	0	28
Bill Kuehne	104	411	93	0.226	0	43
John Richmond	34	131	27	0.206	0	12
Rudy Kemmler	18	64	13	0.203	0	5
Pete Meegan	19	67	13	0.194	0	3
Ed Morris	64	237	44	0.186	0	14
Frank Ringo	3	11	2	0.182	0	0
Doggie Miller	42	166	27	0.163	0	13
John Hofford	3	8	1	0.125	0	0
Pud Galvin	11	38	4	0.105	0	2
Frank Mountain	5	20	2	0.100	0	1

Pitchers

Note: G = Games pitched; IP = Innings pitched; W = Wins; L = Losses; ERA = Earned run average; SO = Strikeouts

Regular Season
Player	G	IP	W	L	ERA	SO
Ed Morris	63	581	39	24	2.35	298
Tom Brown	2	6	0	0	3.00	2
Pete Meegan	18	146	7	8	3.39	58
John Hofford	3	25	0	3	3.60	21
Pud Galvin	11	88 1/3	3	7	3.67	27
Hank O'Day	12	103	5	7	3.67	36
Frank Mountain	5	46	1	4	4.30	7
Charlie Eden	4	15 2/3	1	2	5.17	5

== Notable transactions ==
- June 25, 1885: Milt Scott was purchased by the Alleghenys from the Detroit Wolverines.
