= 1885 New York Metropolitans season =

1885 New York Metropolitans
- League: American Association
- Ballpark: Polo Grounds
- City: New York City
- Record: 44–64 (.407)
- League place: 7th
- Owners: John B. Day, Jim Mutrie
- Manager: Jim Gifford

The 1885 New York Metropolitans were hard hit as manager/co-owner Jim Mutrie moved over to manage the New York Giants and took several of the team's stars with him. The Metropolitans finished with a 44–64 record, seventh place in the American Association.

== Regular season ==
=== Season standings ===
American Association
Team	W	L	Pct.	GB	Home	Road
St. Louis Browns	79	33	.705	—	44‍–‍11	35‍–‍22
Cincinnati Red Stockings	63	49	.562	16	35‍–‍21	28‍–‍28
Pittsburgh Alleghenys	56	55	.505	22½	37‍–‍19	19‍–‍36
Philadelphia Athletics	55	57	.491	24	33‍–‍23	22‍–‍34
Brooklyn Grays	53	59	.473	26	35‍–‍22	18‍–‍37
Louisville Colonels	53	59	.473	26	37‍–‍19	16‍–‍40
New York Metropolitans	44	64	.407	33	28‍–‍24	16‍–‍40
Baltimore Orioles	41	68	.376	36½	29‍–‍26	12‍–‍42

=== Record vs. opponents ===
1885 American Association record Sources:
Team	BAL	BRO	CIN	LOU	NYM	PHA	PIT	STL
Baltimore	—	7–9	6–10	7–9	7–6	6–10–1	6–10	2–14
Brooklyn	9–7	—	5–11	10–6	8–8	11–5	6–10	4–12
Cincinnati	10–6	11–5	—	8–8	10–6	9–7	9–7	6–10
Louisville	9–7	6–10	8–8	—	9–7	8–8	6–10	7–9
New York	6–7	8–8	6–10	7–9	—	5–11	8–7	4–12
Philadelphia	10–6–1	5–11	7–9	8–8	11–5	—	10–6	4–12
Pittsburgh	10–6	10–6	7–9	10–6	7–8	6–10	—	6–10
St. Louis	14–2	12–4	10–6	9–7	12–4	12–4	10–6	—

=== Roster ===
1885 New York Metropolitans
Roster
Pitchers: Buck Becannon; Ed Bagley; Doug Crothers; Ed Cushman; Jack Lynch	Catchers: Cal Broughton; Bill Holbert; Charlie Reipschlager; Infielders: Tom Forster; Frank Hankinson; Jones; Candy Nelson; Dave Orr; Dick Pierson; Joe Reilly; Dasher Troy	Outfielders: Steve Brady; Ed Kennedy; Chief Roseman	Manager: Jim Gifford

== Player stats ==
=== Batting ===
==== Starters by position ====
Note: Pos = Position; G = Games played; AB = At bats; H = Hits; Avg. = Batting average; HR = Home runs; RBI = Runs batted in

Pos	Player	G	AB	H	Avg.	HR	RBI
C	Charlie Reipschlager	72	268	65	.243	0	21
1B	Dave Orr	107	444	152	.342	6	77
2B	Tom Forster	57	213	47	.221	0	18
SS	Candy Nelson	107	420	107	.255	1	30
3B	Frank Hankinson	94	362	81	.224	2	44
OF	Chief Roseman	101	410	114	.278	4	46
OF	Steve Brady	108	434	128	.295	3	58
OF	Ed Kennedy	96	349	71	.203	2	21

==== Other batters ====
Note: G = Games played; AB = At bats; H = Hits; Avg. = Batting average; HR = Home runs; RBI = Runs batted in

Player	G	AB	H	Avg.	HR	RBI
Bill Holbert	56	202	35	.173	0	13
Dasher Troy	45	177	39	.220	2	12
Cal Broughton	11	41	6	.146	0	1
Joe Reilly	10	40	7	.175	0	3
Dick Pierson	3	9	1	.111	0	0
Jones	1	4	1	.250	0	0

=== Pitching ===
==== Starting pitchers ====
Note: G = Games pitched; IP = Innings pitched; W = Wins; L = Losses; ERA = Earned run average; SO = Strikeouts

Player	G	IP	W	L	ERA	SO
Jack Lynch	44	379.0	23	21	3.61	177
Ed Cushman	22	191.0	8	14	2.78	133
Doug Crothers	18	154.0	7	11	5.08	40
Ed Bagley	15	115.0	4	9	4.93	44
Buck Becannon	10	85.0	2	8	6.25	13
Chief Roseman	1	3.0	0	1	27.00	0

==== Relief pitchers ====
Note: G = Games pitched; W = Wins; L = Losses; SV = Saves; ERA = Earned run average; SO = Strikeouts

Player	G	W	L	SV	ERA	SO
Dave Orr	3	0	0	0	7.20	1
Frank Hankinson	1	0	0	0	4.50	0
