= 1885 Philadelphia Athletics season =

1885 Philadelphia Athletics
- League: American Association
- Ballpark: Jefferson Street Grounds
- City: Philadelphia, Pennsylvania
- Record: 55–57 (.491)
- League place: 4th
- Owners: Bill Sharsig, Lew Simmons, Charlie Mason
- Manager: Harry Stovey

The 1885 Philadelphia Athletics finished with a 55–57 record and finished in fourth place in the American Association.

== Regular season ==
=== Season standings ===
American Association
Team	W	L	Pct.	GB	Home	Road
St. Louis Browns	79	33	.705	—	44‍–‍11	35‍–‍22
Cincinnati Red Stockings	63	49	.562	16	35‍–‍21	28‍–‍28
Pittsburgh Alleghenys	56	55	.505	22½	37‍–‍19	19‍–‍36
Philadelphia Athletics	55	57	.491	24	33‍–‍23	22‍–‍34
Brooklyn Grays	53	59	.473	26	35‍–‍22	18‍–‍37
Louisville Colonels	53	59	.473	26	37‍–‍19	16‍–‍40
New York Metropolitans	44	64	.407	33	28‍–‍24	16‍–‍40
Baltimore Orioles	41	68	.376	36½	29‍–‍26	12‍–‍42

=== Record vs. opponents ===
1885 American Association record Sources:
Team	BAL	BRO	CIN	LOU	NYM	PHA	PIT	STL
Baltimore	—	7–9	6–10	7–9	7–6	6–10–1	6–10	2–14
Brooklyn	9–7	—	5–11	10–6	8–8	11–5	6–10	4–12
Cincinnati	10–6	11–5	—	8–8	10–6	9–7	9–7	6–10
Louisville	9–7	6–10	8–8	—	9–7	8–8	6–10	7–9
New York	6–7	8–8	6–10	7–9	—	5–11	8–7	4–12
Philadelphia	10–6–1	5–11	7–9	8–8	11–5	—	10–6	4–12
Pittsburgh	10–6	10–6	7–9	10–6	7–8	6–10	—	6–10
St. Louis	14–2	12–4	10–6	9–7	12–4	12–4	10–6	—

=== Roster ===
1885 Philadelphia Athletics
Roster
Pitchers: Jim Conway; Ed Cushman; Bob Emslie; Ed Knouff; Tom Lovett; Bobby Mathews; Phenomenal Smith; Billy Taylor; Bill Vinton	Catchers: Eddie Fusselback; Jocko Milligan; Jack O'Brien; Marshall Quinton; Frank Siffell; Infielders: Fred Corey; Sadie Houck; Jim Powell; Harry Stovey; Cub Stricker; George Strief	Outfielders: John Coleman; Bill Hughes; Lon Knight; Henry Larkin; Blondie Purcell; Orator Shafer	Manager: Harry Stovey

== Player stats ==
=== Batting ===
==== Starters by position ====
Note: Pos = Position; G = Games played; AB = At bats; H = Hits; Avg. = Batting average; HR = Home runs; RBI = Runs batted in

Pos	Player	G	AB	H	Avg.	HR	RBI
C	Jocko Milligan	67	265	71	.268	2	39
1B	Harry Stovey	112	486	153	.315	13	75
2B	Cub Stricker	106	398	93	.234	1	41
SS	Sadie Houck	93	388	99	.255	0	54
3B	Fred Corey	94	384	94	.245	1	38
OF	John Coleman	96	398	119	.299	3	70
OF	Blondie Purcell	66	304	90	.296	0	22
OF	Henry Larkin	108	453	149	.329	8	88

==== Other batters ====
Note: G = Games played; AB = At bats; H = Hits; Avg. = Batting average; HR = Home runs; RBI = Runs batted in

Player	G	AB	H	Avg.	HR	RBI
Jack O'Brien	62	225	60	.267	2	30
George Strief	44	175	48	.274	0	27
Lon Knight	29	119	25	.210	0	14
Jim Powell	19	75	12	.160	0	5
Marshall Quinton	7	29	6	.207	0	4
Eddie Fusselback	5	19	6	.316	0	2
Frank Siffell	3	10	1	.100	0	0
Orator Shafer	2	9	2	.222	0	1

=== Pitching ===
==== Starting pitchers ====
Note: G = Games pitched; IP = Innings pitched; W = Wins; L = Losses; ERA = Earned run average; SO = Strikeouts

Player	G	IP	W	L	ERA	SO
Bobby Mathews	48	422.1	30	17	2.43	286
Tom Lovett	16	138.2	7	8	3.70	56
Ed Knouff	14	106.0	7	6	3.65	43
Ed Cushman	10	87.0	3	7	3.52	37
Bill Vinton	7	55.0	4	3	2.45	34
Billy Taylor	6	52.1	1	5	3.27	11
Bob Emslie	4	28.2	0	4	6.28	9
Bill Hughes	2	16.2	0	2	4.86	4
Jim Conway	2	12.1	0	1	7.30	0
Fred Corey	1	9.0	1	0	7.00	3
Phenomenal Smith	1	4.0	0	1	9.00	7

==== Other pitchers ====
Note: G = Games pitched; IP = Innings pitched; W = Wins; L = Losses; ERA = Earned run average; SO = Strikeouts

Player	G	IP	W	L	ERA	SO
John Coleman	8	60.1	2	2	3.43	12

==== Relief pitchers ====
Note: G = Games pitched; W = Wins; L = Losses; SV = Saves; ERA = Earned run average; SO = Strikeouts

Player	G	W	L	SV	ERA	SO
Blondie Purcell	1	0	1	0	6.00	3
Lon Knight	1	0	0	0	1.80	1
