= Gus Shallix =

German-American baseball player (1858–1937)

- Pitcher
- Born: March 29, 1858; Paderborn, Kingdom of Prussia
- Died: October 28, 1937 (aged 79); Cincinnati, Ohio, U.S.
- Batted: Right Threw: Right

MLB debut
- June 22, 1884, for the Cincinnati Red Stockings

Last MLB appearance
- June 2, 1885, for the Cincinnati Red Stockings

MLB statistics
- Win–loss record: 17–14
- Earned run average: 3.56
- Strikeouts: 93
- Stats at Baseball Reference

Teams
- Cincinnati Red Stockings (1884–1885)

August Shallix (March 29, 1858 – October 28, 1937) was a professional baseball player who played pitcher in the Major Leagues from 1884–1885. He played for the Cincinnati Red Stockings.
