= Bill McCaffrey =

American baseball player

- Pitcher
- Born: April 1, 1862; Baltimore County, Maryland
- Died: September 9, 1927 (aged 65); Baltimore, Maryland
- Batted: Unknown Threw: Unknown

MLB debut
- June 15, 1885, for the Cincinnati Red Stockings

Last MLB appearance
- June 15, 1885, for the Cincinnati Red Stockings

MLB statistics
- Win–loss record: 1–0
- Earned run average: 6.00
- Strikeouts: 2
- Stats at Baseball Reference

Teams
- Cincinnati Red Stockings (1885)

William T. McCaffrey (April 1, 1862 – September 9, 1927) was a professional baseball player who played pitcher in the Major Leagues for the 1885 Cincinnati Red Stockings. His Major League debut came as the starting pitcher against the Brooklyn Trolley Dodgers on June 15, 1885, a game McCaffrey and the Red Stockings won despite McCaffrey giving up 9 runs, 6 of them earned, as the Red Stockings scored 11 runs in the game against Brooklyn's starting pitcher Adonis Terry. In 1886, Terry played for the Wilkes-Barre's minor league team in the Pennsylvania State Association.
