= 1885 World Series =

Pre-modern baseball championship

1885 World's Championship Series
Team (Wins)	Manager(s)	Season
Chicago White Stockings (3)	Cap Anson	87–25–1 (.774), GA: 2
St. Louis Browns (3)	Charles Comiskey	79–33 (.705), GA: 16
- Dates: October 14–24
- Venue(s): West Side Park (Chicago); Sportsman's Park (St. Louis); Recreation Park (Pittsburgh); American Park (Cincinnati)
- Umpires: Dave Sullivan, Harry McCaffrey, William Medart, John Kelly
- Hall of Famers: Browns: Charles Comiskey (player-manager) (Note: Comiskey was inducted in 1939 as an executive owing to his 30 year tenure as owner of the Chicago White Sox, although his plaque mentions his decades of involvement in baseball as player and manager.); White Stockings: Cap Anson (player-manager)‡ John Clarkson; King Kelly ‡ elected as a player.

The 1885 World Series (the "World's Championship") was an end-of-the-year playoff series between the National League champion Chicago White Stockings and American Association champion St. Louis Browns. The Series was played in four cities (Chicago, St. Louis, Pittsburgh, and Cincinnati). It ended in a disputed 3–3–1 tie; Chicago outscored St. Louis 36–32 in the seven games played.

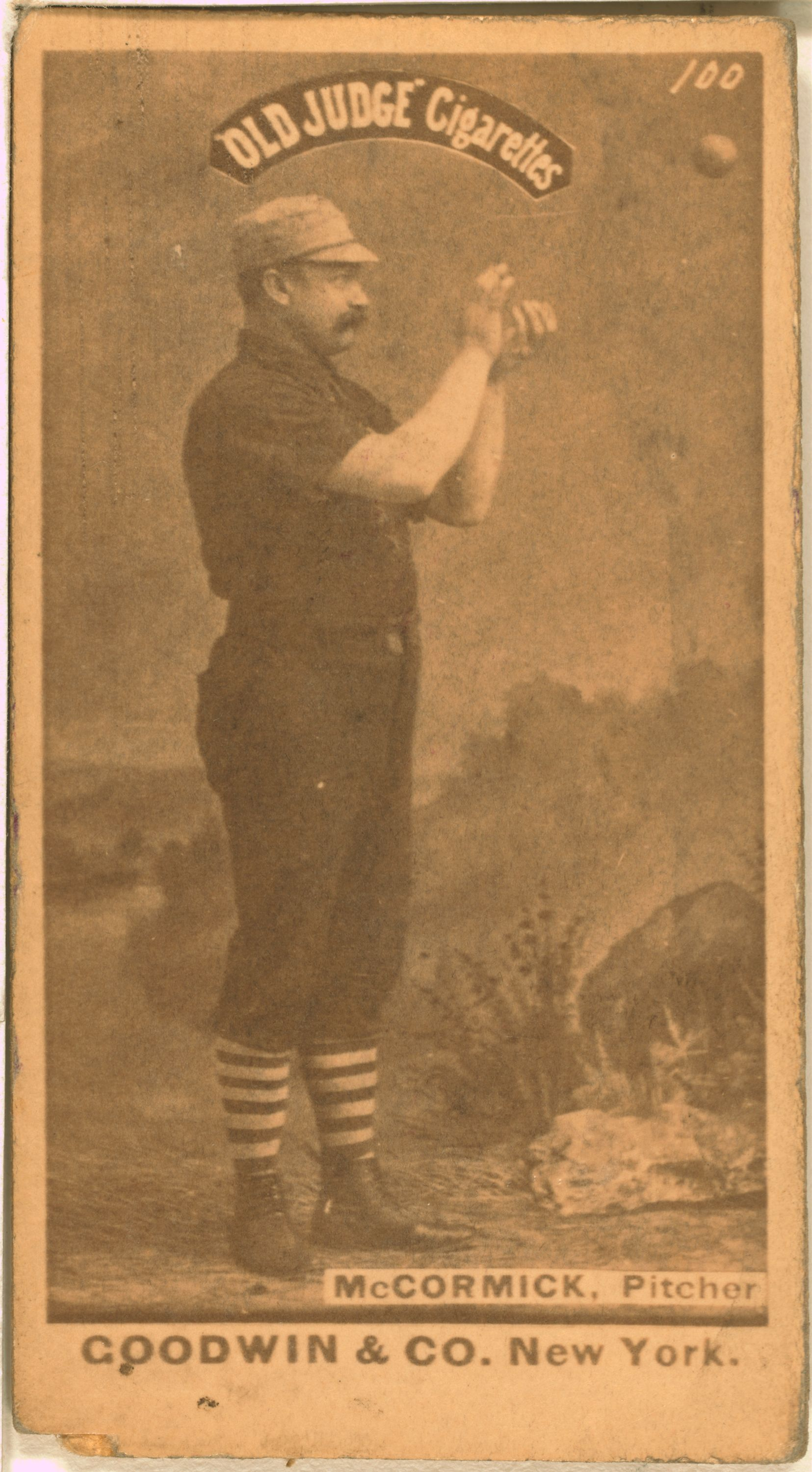
Pitcher Jim McCormick started five of the seven games for Chicago, going 3–2.

== Summary ==
Series tied, 3–3–1.

Game	Date	Score	Location
1	October 14	Chicago White Stockings – 5, St. Louis Browns – 5	West Side Park, Chicago
2	October 15	Chicago White Stockings – 5, St. Louis Browns – 4	Sportsman's Park, St. Louis
3	October 16	Chicago White Stocking – 2, St. Louis Browns – 3	Sportsman's Park, St. Louis
4	October 17	Chicago White Stockings – 2, St. Louis Browns – 3	Sportsman's Park, St. Louis
5	October 22	Chicago White Stockings – 9, St. Louis Browns – 2	Recreation Park, Pittsburgh
6	October 23	Chicago White Stockings – 9, St. Louis Browns – 2	American Park, Cincinnati
7	October 24	St. Louis Browns – 13, Chicago White Stockings – 4	American Park, Cincinnati

== Game summaries ==
=== Game 1 ===
Wednesday, October 14, 1885 at West Side Park, Chicago, Illinois
Team	1	2	3	4	5	6	7	8	R	H	E
Chicago White Stockings	0	0	0	1	0	0	0	4	5	6	11
St. Louis Browns	0	1	0	4	0	0	0	0	5	7	4
Starting pitchers: CHI: John Clarkson (0–0–1); STL: Bob Caruthers (0–0–1); Attendance: 3,000; Umpires: Dave Sullivan

=== Game 2 ===
Thursday, October 15, 1885 at Sportsman's Park in St. Louis, Missouri
Team	1	2	3	4	5	6	R	H	E
Chicago White Stockings	1	1	0	0	0	3	5	6	5
St. Louis Browns	3	0	0	1	0	X	4	2	4
Starting pitchers: CHI: Jim McCormick; STL: Dave Foutz; WP: Jim McCormick (1–0) LP: Dave Foutz (0–1); Attendance: 3,000; Umpires: Dave Sullivan; Notes: Game forfeited to Chicago with 1 out in the top of the 6th inning.

With Chicago leading 5–4 in the sixth inning, Browns manager Charles Comiskey called his team off the field to protest a ruling made by umpire Dave Sullivan. The game was forfeited to Chicago.

=== Game 3 ===
Friday, October 16, 1885 at Sportsman's Park in St. Louis, Missouri
Team	1	2	3	4	5	6	7	8	9	R	H	E
Chicago White Stockings	1	1	1	0	0	0	0	0	1	4	8	12
St. Louis Browns	5	0	0	0	0	2	0	0	X	7	8	4
Starting pitchers: CHI: John Clarkson; STL: Bob Caruthers; WP: Bob Caruthers (1–0–1) LP: John Clarkson (0–1–1); Attendance: 3,000; Umpires: Harry McCaffrey

=== Game 4 ===
Saturday, October 17, 1885 at Sportsman's Park in St. Louis, Missouri
Team	1	2	3	4	5	6	7	8	9	R	H	E
Chicago White Stockings	0	0	0	0	2	0	0	0	0	2	8	3
St. Louis Browns	0	0	1	0	0	0	0	2	X	3	6	7
Starting pitchers: CHI: Jim McCormick; STL: Dave Foutz; WP: Dave Foutz (1–1) LP: Jim McCormick (1–1); Home runs: CHI: Abner Dalrymple (1); STL: None; Umpires: William Medart

=== Game 5 ===
Friday, October 23, 1885 at Recreation Park in Pittsburgh, Pennsylvania
Team	1	2	3	4	5	6	7	R	H	E
Chicago White Stockings	4	0	0	1	1	0	3	9	7	1
St. Louis Browns	0	1	0	0	0	0	1	2	4	7
Starting pitchers: CHI: Jim McCormick; STL: Dave Foutz; WP: Jim McCormick (2–1) LP: Dave Foutz (1–2); Attendance: Less than 500; Umpires: John Kelly

The fifth game was played at Pittsburgh. The weather was cold and not over 500 people were present. Chicago won easily (9–2) through superior batting and fielding. At the end of the seventh inning, the game was called on account of darkness.

=== Game 6 ===
Saturday, October 24, 1885 at American Park in Cincinnati, Ohio
Team	1	2	3	4	5	6	7	8	9	R	H	E
Chicago White Stockings	2	0	0	1	1	1	0	4	0	9	11	10
St. Louis Browns	0	0	2	0	0	0	0	0	0	2	2	7
Starting pitchers: CHI: Jim McCormick; STL: Bob Caruthers; WP: Jim McCormick (3–1) LP: Bob Caruthers (1–1–1); Attendance: 1,500; Umpires: John Kelly

Friday, October 23, American Park, Cincinnati — The series moved from Pittsburgh to Cincinnati‚ setting a record for most host cities in a World Series. (The 1887 series was later staged in 10 cities.) Chicago took a 3–2 series lead by beating the Browns 9–2.

=== Game 7 ===
Saturday, October 24, 1885 at American Park in Cincinnati, Ohio
Team	1	2	3	4	5	6	7	8	R	H	E
Chicago White Stockings	2	0	0	0	2	1	0	0	4	9	17
St. Louis Browns	0	0	4	6	2	1	0	X	13	12	10
Starting pitchers: CHI: Jim McCormick; STL: Dave Foutz; WP: Dave Foutz (2–2) LP: Jim McCormick (3–2); Attendance: 1,200; Umpires: John Kelly

Behind pitcher Dave Foutz, St. Louis defeated Chicago 13–4 in the 7th and final game. The Browns claim the game 2 forfeit didn't count and therefore claim the championship. The two clubs split the $1,000 prize.

=== Unplayed games ===
There were five originally planned games to be played after Game 7; in Baltimore on the 27th, Philadelphia the 28th and 29th, and Brooklyn the 30th and 31st.

== See also ==
- 1885
- List of pre-World Series baseball champions
