= Larry McKeon (baseball) =

American baseball player

- Pitcher
- Born: 1857 or 1858; New York, New York, U.S.
- Died: July 18, 1915 (aged 57); Indianapolis, Indiana, U.S.
- Batted: right Threw: right

MLB debut
- May 1, 1884, for the Indianapolis Hoosiers

Last MLB appearance
- September 15, 1886, for the Kansas City Cowboys

MLB statistics
- Win–loss record: 46–64
- Earned run average: 3.71
- Strikeouts: 474
- Stats at Baseball Reference

Teams
- Indianapolis Hoosiers (1884); Cincinnati Red Stockings (1885); Kansas City Cowboys (1886)

Lawrence G. McKeon (1857/1858 – July 18, 1915) was an American pitcher in Major League Baseball for three seasons, from 1884 to 1886. He played one season each for the Indianapolis Hoosiers, Cincinnati Red Stockings, and Kansas City Cowboys. He was born in New York City, and died in Indianapolis on July 18, 1915, at age 57. He is interred at St. Mary Cemetery in Port Jervis, New York.
