= Jim Keenan =

American baseball player (1856–1926)

- Catcher
- Born: February 10, 1856; New Haven, Connecticut, U.S.
- Died: September 21, 1926 (aged 70); Cincinnati, Ohio, U.S.
- Batted: Right Threw: Right

MLB debut
- May 17, 1875, for the New Haven Elm Citys

Last MLB appearance
- October 3, 1891, for the Cincinnati Reds

MLB statistics
- Batting average: .240
- Home runs: 22
- Runs scored: 254
- Stats at Baseball Reference

Teams
- New Haven Elm Citys (1875); Buffalo Bisons (1880); Pittsburgh Alleghenys (1882); Indianapolis Hoosiers (1884); Cincinnati Red Stockings (AA)/Reds (1885–91)

James William Keenan (February 10, 1856 – September 21, 1926) was an American professional baseball catcher. He played most of his major league career with the Cincinnati Red Stockings of the American Association and later National League, after they became the Cincinnati Reds.

Keenan made his debut at age 17 with the New Haven Elm Citys of the National Association, but did not establish himself in the majors until 1884, when he became the regular catcher for the Indianapolis Hoosiers. He stayed in Indianapolis to start the 1885 season, with the city's entry in the Western League, but the league quickly folded, and he was acquired by the Detroit Wolverines.

Before he played a game for Detroit, however, Keenan jumped to the Red Stockings, where he split time at catcher with Pop Snyder. Over the next four seasons, he would split catching duties for the Red Stockings with Kid Baldwin. In 1890 and 1891, he backed up Jerry Harrington.

== Sources ==
- Career statistics from Baseball Reference · Baseball Reference (Minors) · Retrosheet · Baseball Almanac
