= Charlie Robinson (baseball) =

American baseball player (1856–1913)

- Catcher
- Born: July 27, 1856; Westerly, Rhode Island, U.S.
- Died: May 18, 1913 (aged 56); Providence, Rhode Island, U.S.
- Batted: Left Threw: Right

MLB debut
- August 2, 1884, for the Indianapolis Hoosiers

Last MLB appearance
- July 4, 1885, for the Brooklyn Grays

MLB statistics
- Batting average: .242
- Home runs: 0
- Runs batted in: 4
- Stats at Baseball Reference

Teams
- Indianapolis Hoosiers (1884); Brooklyn Grays (1885)

Charles Henry Robinson (July 27, 1856 – May 18, 1913) was an American Major League Baseball catcher during the 1884 and 1885 seasons.

Born in the Rhode Island beachfront town of Westerly, Robinson died in Providence at the age of 56.
