= Mike Drissel =

American baseball player (1864–1913)

- Catcher
- Born: December 19, 1864; St. Louis, Missouri
- Died: February 26, 1913 (aged 48); St. Louis, Missouri
- Batted: Right Threw: Right

MLB debut
- September 5, 1885, for the St. Louis Browns

Last MLB appearance
- September 11, 1885, for the St. Louis Browns

MLB statistics
- Batting average: .050
- Home runs: 0
- Runs batted in: 33
- Stats at Baseball Reference

Teams
- St. Louis Browns (1885)

Michael F. Drissel (December 19, 1864 – February 26, 1913), was a professional baseball player who played catcher in the Major Leagues for the 1885 St. Louis Browns.
