= Joe Reilly (baseball) =

American baseball player (born 1861)

- Second baseman
- Born: 1861; New York, New York
- Died: Unknown
- Batted: Unknown Threw: Unknown

MLB debut
- June 8, 1885, for the New York Metropolitans

Last MLB appearance
- June 19, 1885, for the New York Metropolitans

MLB statistics
- Batting average: .175
- Home runs: 0
- RBI: 3
- Stats at Baseball Reference

Teams
- New York Metropolitans (1885)

James Reilly (1861–?) was a Major League Baseball player who played second base for the 1885 New York Metropolitans.
