= George Mappes =

American baseball player (1865–1934)

- Second baseman / Catcher
- Born: December 25, 1865; St. Louis, Missouri, U.S.
- Died: February 20, 1934 (aged 68); St. Louis, Missouri, U.S.
- Batted: Unknown Threw: Unknown

MLB debut
- September 23, 1885, for the Baltimore Orioles

Last MLB appearance
- October 9, 1886, for the St. Louis Maroons

MLB statistics
- Batting average: .182
- Hits: 6
- At bats: 33
- Stats at Baseball Reference

Teams
- Baltimore Orioles (1885); St. Louis Maroons (1886)

George Richard Mappes (December 25, 1865 – February 20, 1934) was an American professional baseball catcher and second baseman for the St. Louis Maroons and Baltimore Orioles.
