= George McVey =

American baseball player (1865–1896)

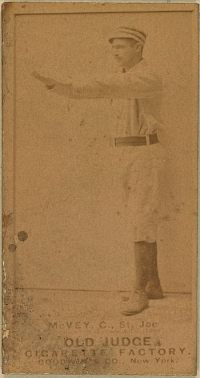
- First baseman / Catcher
- Born: September 16, 1865; Port Jervis, New York, U.S.
- Died: May 3, 1896 (aged 30); Quincy, Illinois, U.S.
- Batted: Right Threw: Right

MLB debut
- September 19, 1885, for the Brooklyn Grays

Last MLB appearance
- September 29, 1885, for the Brooklyn Grays

MLB statistics
- Batting average: .143
- Home runs: 0
- Runs batted in: 1
- Stats at Baseball Reference

Teams
- Brooklyn Grays (1885)

George William McVey (September 16, 1865 – May 3, 1896) was an American professional baseball player. He played one season with the Brooklyn Grays, appearing in three games each at first base, and catcher in 1885.
