= Charlie Krehmeyer =

American baseball player (1863–1926)

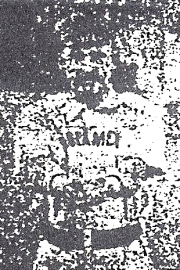
- Outfielder / Catcher
- Born: July 5, 1863; St. Louis, Missouri, U.S.
- Died: February 10, 1926 (aged 62); St. Louis, Missouri, U.S.
- Batted: Left Threw: Left

MLB debut
- July 8, 1884, for the St. Louis Browns

Last MLB appearance
- July 19, 1885, for the St. Louis Maroons

MLB statistics
- Batting average: .221
- Home runs: 0
- Runs scored: 10
- Stats at Baseball Reference

Teams
- St. Louis Browns (1884); Louisville Colonels (1885); St. Louis Maroons (1885)

Charles L. Krehmeyer (July 5, 1863 – February 10, 1926) was a 19th-century American professional baseball player. He was a member of a small fraternity—left-handed catchers. Although official sources give an 1863 birthdate, research by his SABR biographer gives substantial support to an 1859 birthdate.
