= Bill Mountjoy =

Canadian baseball player (1858–1894)

- Pitcher
- Born: December 11, 1858; London, Canada West
- Died: May 19, 1894 (aged 35); London, Ontario, Canada
- Batted: Left Threw: Right

MLB debut
- September 29, 1883, for the Cincinnati Red Stockings

Last MLB appearance
- August 18, 1885, for the Baltimore Orioles

MLB statistics
- Win–loss record: 31–24
- Strikeouts: 164
- Earned run average: 3.25
- Stats at Baseball Reference

Teams
- Cincinnati Red Stockings (1883–1885); Baltimore Orioles (1885)

William Henry Mountjoy (a.k.a. Medicine Bill) (December 11, 1858 – May 19, 1894) was a Canadian-born pitcher in Major League Baseball.
