= Frank Siffell =

American baseball player (1861–1909)

- Catcher
- Born: 1861; Germany
- Died: October 26, 1909 (aged 47–48); Philadelphia, Pennsylvania
- Batted: Unknown Threw: Unknown

MLB debut
- June 14, 1884, for the Philadelphia Athletics

Last MLB appearance
- September 16, 1885, for the Philadelphia Athletics

MLB statistics
- Batting average: .148
- Home runs: 0
- Runs batted in: 3
- Stats at Baseball Reference

Teams
- Philadelphia Athletics (1884–1885)

Frank Siffell (1861 – 26 October 1909) was a 19th-century Major League Baseball player. He played primarily catcher during the 1884 and 1885 seasons for the Philadelphia Athletics of the American Association.

== Sources ==
- Career statistics from Baseball Reference · Retrosheet · Baseball Almanac
