= Gene Derby =

American baseball player (1860–1917)

- Catcher
- Born: February 3, 1860; Fitchburg, Massachusetts, U.S.
- Died: February 13, 1917 (aged 57); Waterbury, Connecticut, U.S.
- Batted: Unknown Threw: Unknown

MLB debut
- September 3, 1885, for the Baltimore Orioles

Last MLB appearance
- September 30, 1885, for the Baltimore Orioles

MLB statistics
- Batting average: .129
- Hits: 4
- At bats: 31
- Stats at Baseball Reference

Teams
- Baltimore Orioles (1885)

Eugene A. Derby (February 3, 1860 – February 13, 1917) was an American professional baseball catcher, who appeared in ten games for the 1885 Baltimore Orioles of the American Association. He continued to play in the minor leagues through 1891.
