= Jimmy Peoples =

American baseball player (1863–1920)

- Catcher / Shortstop
- Born: October 8, 1863; Big Beaver, Michigan, U.S.
- Died: August 29, 1920 (aged 56); Detroit, Michigan, U.S.
- Batted: Unknown Threw: Right

MLB debut
- May 29, 1884, for the Cincinnati Red Stockings

Last MLB appearance
- July 23, 1889, for the Columbus Solons

MLB statistics
- Batting average: .211
- Home runs: 7
- Runs batted in: 141
- Stats at Baseball Reference

Teams
- Cincinnati Red Stockings (1884–1885); Brooklyn Grays/Bridegrooms (1885–1888); Columbus Solons (1889)

James Elsworth Peoples (October 8, 1863 – August 29, 1920) was an American catcher and shortstop in Major League Baseball in the 19th century. He played from 1884 to 1889 in the majors and through 1894 in the minors.

He was born on October 8, 1863, in Big Beaver, Michigan, which is now part of Troy, Michigan. He died on August 29, 1920, in Detroit, Michigan.

== Sources ==
- Career statistics from Baseball Reference · Baseball Reference (Minors) · Retrosheet · Baseball Almanac
- Baseball Almanac
- Encyclopedia of Baseball Catchers
