= Phil Powers (baseball) =

American baseball player (1854–1914)

- Catcher
- Born: July 26, 1854; New York City, New York, U.S.
- Died: December 22, 1914 (aged 60); New York City, New York, U.S.
- Batted: Right Threw: Right

MLB debut
- August 31, 1878, for the Chicago White Stockings

Last MLB appearance
- August 26, 1885, for the Baltimore Orioles

MLB statistics
- Games: 155
- Batting average: .180
- Runs batted in: 42

Teams
- Chicago White Stockings (1878); Boston Red Caps (1880); Cleveland Blues(1881); Cincinnati Red Stockings (1882–1885); Baltimore Orioles (1885)

Philip J. Powers (July 26, 1854 – December 22, 1914) was an American Major League Baseball catcher from 1878 to 1885.

He was used mostly as a backup for five different teams in the National League and American Association.
