= Jim Field =

American baseball player (1863–1953)

- First baseman
- Born: April 24, 1863; Philadelphia, Pennsylvania, U.S.
- Died: May 13, 1953 (aged 90); Atlantic City, New Jersey, U.S.
- Batted: Unknown Threw: Unknown

MLB debut
- June 2, 1883, for the Columbus Buckeyes

Last MLB appearance
- July 21, 1898, for the Washington Senators

MLB statistics
- Batting average: .230
- Hits: 292
- RBIs: 180
- Stats at Baseball Reference

Teams
- Columbus Buckeyes (1883–1884); Pittsburgh Alleghenys (1885); Baltimore Orioles (1885); Rochester Broncos (1890); Washington Senators (1898)

James C. Field (April 24, 1863 in Philadelphia – May 13, 1953 in Atlantic City, New Jersey) was an American Major League Baseball first baseman for five seasons. He played for several teams from 1883 to 1898.

His brother, Sam Field, also played professional baseball.
