= Dan Sullivan (baseball) =

American baseball player (1857–1893)

- Catcher
- Born: May 9, 1857; Providence, Rhode Island, U.S.
- Died: October 26, 1893 (aged 36); Providence, Rhode Island, U.S.
- Batted: Unknown Threw: Right

MLB debut
- May 2, 1882, for the Louisville Eclipse

Last MLB appearance
- April 18, 1886, for the Pittsburgh Alleghenys

MLB statistics
- Batting average: .232
- Home runs: 0
- Runs batted in: 33
- Stats at Baseball Reference

Teams
- Louisville Eclipse/Colonels (1882–1885); St. Louis Browns (1885); Pittsburgh Alleghenys (1886)

Daniel C. Sullivan (May 9, 1857 – October 26, 1893), nicknamed "Link", was an American professional baseball player who was a catcher in the Major Leagues from 1882–1886. He played for the St. Louis Browns, Pittsburgh Alleghenys, and Louisville Eclipse. He caught the sixth and seventh no-hitters in baseball history (by Tony Mullane and Guy Hecker, respectively) eight days apart on September 11 and 19, 1882.
