= Kid Baldwin =

American baseball player (1864–1897)

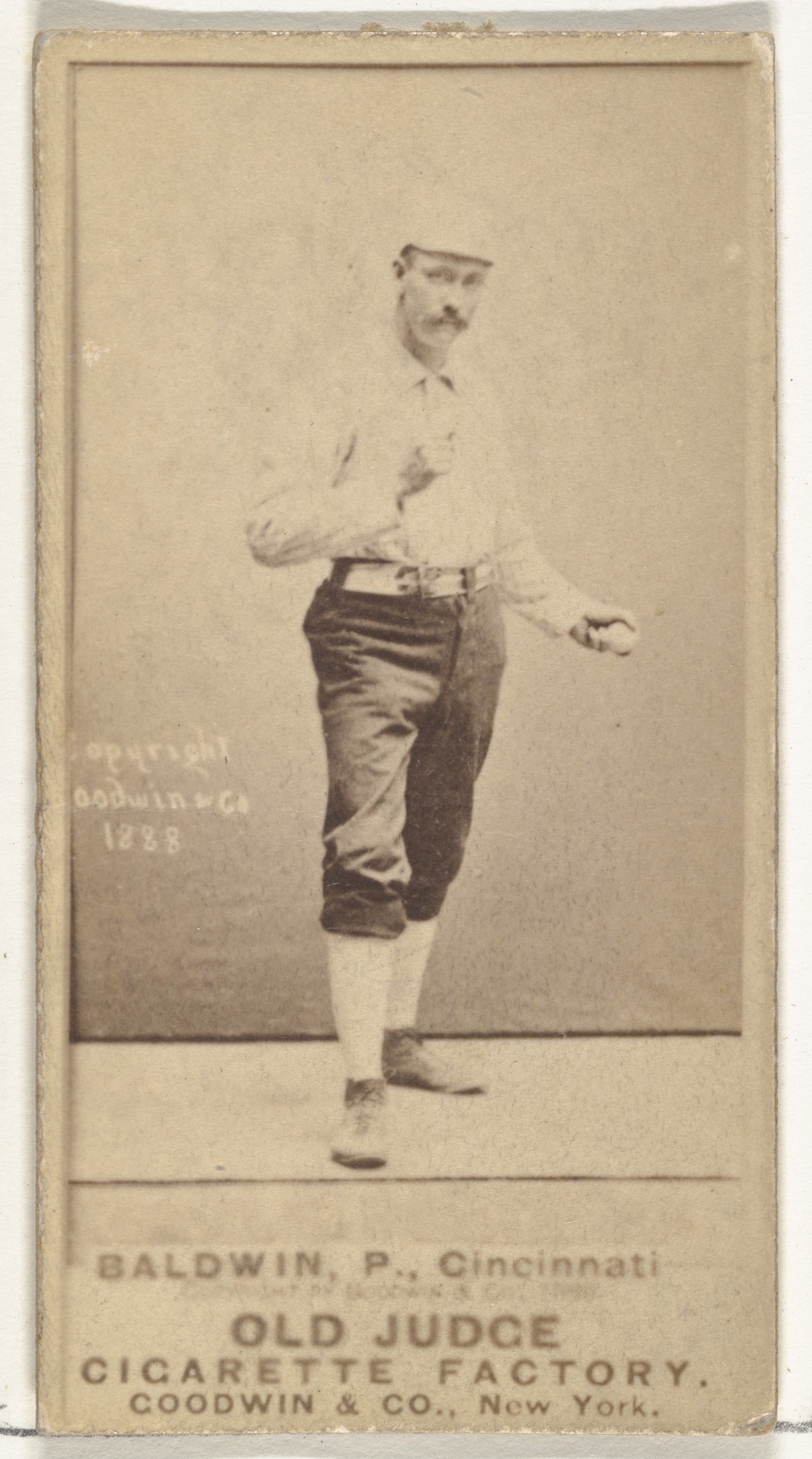
- 1888 baseball card of Baldwin
- Catcher
- Born: October 1, 1864; Newport, Kentucky, U.S.
- Died: July 10, 1897 (aged 32); Cincinnati, Ohio, U.S.
- Batted: Right Threw: Right

MLB debut
- July 27, 1884, for the Kansas City Cowboys

Last MLB appearance
- September 16, 1890, for the Philadelphia Athletics

MLB statistics
- Batting average: .221
- Home runs: 7
- Runs batted in: 178
- Stats at Baseball Reference

Teams
- Kansas City Cowboys (1884); Chicago Browns/Pittsburgh Stogies (1884); Cincinnati Red Stockings/Cincinnati Reds (1885–1890); Philadelphia Athletics (1890)

Clarence Geoghan "Kid" Baldwin (October 1, 1864 – July 10, 1897) was an American Major League Baseball catcher. He played seven seasons at the Major League level. In addition to playing catcher, Baldwin also played outfield, third base, second base, and first base. He also pitched two games in the 1885 season. He played well until the mid-August collapse of the Pacific Northwest League.
