= History of the Cincinnati Reds =

The Cincinnati Reds, a Major League Baseball team, were originally members of the American Association from 1882 to 1889; the team has played in the National League ever since, being one of only five 19th-century teams still playing in its original city.

== 1866–1896: The original "Red Stockings" and the pre-NL days ==
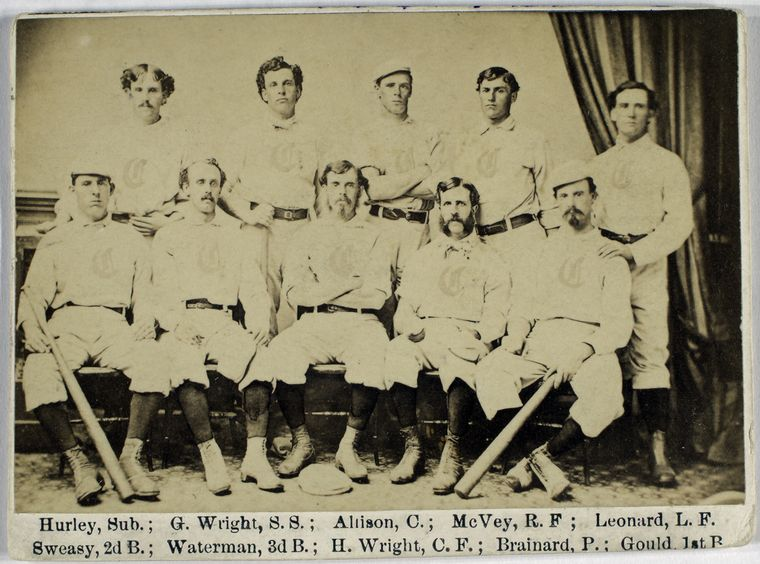
The 1869 Cincinnati Red Stockings team photograph

An amateur team formed by lawyers that gradually added professionals was originally called the Resolute Base Ball Club of Cincinnati, but the name was soon changed to the Cincinnati Base Ball Club. The team became known as the Cincinnati Red Stockings due to its wearing knickers rather than the traditional trousers, with red knee socks- a costume condemned as "immoral" by the more prudish. It became baseball's first openly all-professional team when it became fully professional in 1869. The Red Stockings won 130 straight games throughout 1869 and 1870, before being defeated by the Atlantic Club of Brooklyn. Star players included brothers Harry and George Wright, Fred Waterman, and pitcher Asa Brainard. The 1869 Red Stockings made an eastern swing of 21 games and went undefeated. According to Walter Camp, the team received a banquet and a "champion bat ... this rather remarkable testimonial was twenty-seven feet long and nine inches in diameter." The following year, the team lost only one game. They were defeated at the Brooklyn Athletic's Capitoline grounds park. According to Camp, the Red Stockings lost 8–7 in 11 innings. The game apparently served as a precursor to today's unruly crowds because he wrote: "A crowd of ten thousand people assembled to witness this match, and so lost their heads in the excitement as to give the Western men a very unfair reception."

The Red Stockings lost many players and their namesake in 1870, when the team decided to dissolve. The name went to Boston where, in 1871, a new team featuring some of Cincinnati's former stars began play, wearing the same trademark knickers and red knee socks and thus similarly dubbed "Red Stockings" by the press. This franchise would eventually become the Atlanta Braves. A new Cincinnati Red Stockings team became a charter member of the National League in 1876, five years after the first Red Stockings team. The second Red Stockings team was expelled from the league after the 1880 season, for 'violating' rules which had not yet gone into effect: namely, serving beer at games and allowing their park to be used on Sundays.

A third Cincinnati team of the same name was founded in 1881, becoming a founding member of the American Association, a rival league that began play in 1882. That team (which is the same franchise of today) played for eight seasons in the American Association and won the first Association pennant in 1882. The pennant winning club still holds the record for the highest winning percentage of any Reds club to date (.688). In November 1889, the Cincinnati club and the AA's Brooklyn franchise both left the Association for the National League. Around this time, sportswriters started dropping "Stockings" when writing about the club and used simply "Reds", likely to avoid confusion with the established NL club in Boston, which was also referred to in the press as "Red Stockings".

== 1890–1911: In the National League for good ==

The Cincinnati Red Stockings left the American Association in 1890 to play in the National League. One of the main reasons had absolutely nothing to do with the team directly—the upstart Player's League, an early, failed attempt to break the reserve clause in baseball. The league's impending presence severely weakened both previously existing leagues, and, because the National League decided to expand and the American Association was weakening, the team decided to accept the invitation to become members of the stronger National League. It was also at this time that the press first shortened their usual nickname from "Red Stockings" to "Reds". The Reds wandered through the 1890s signing local stars & aging veterans. During this time, the team never finished above third place (1897) and never closer than 10 1/2 games (1890).

At the start of the 20th century, the Reds had hitting stars such as Sam Crawford and Cy Seymour. Seymour's .377 average in 1905 was the first individual batting crown won by a Red. In 1911, Bob Bescher stole 81 bases which is still a team record. Like the previous decade, the 1900s were not kind to the Reds, as much of the decade was spent in the league's second division.

In 1911 the club made its longstanding monicker official, putting "Reds" on its uniforms for the first time; that Reds-inside-elongated-C "wishbone" logo remains in use to this day.

== 1912–1932: Redland Field to the Great Depression ==
In 1912, Redland Field, later to be known as Crosley Field, built on the corner of Findlay and Western Avenues on the city's west side opened for the Reds. The Reds had actually been playing baseball on that site for the last 20 years. By the late 1910s the Reds began to come out of the second division. The 1918 team finished 4th, and then new manager Pat Moran led the Reds to an NL pennant in 1919. The 1919 team had hitting stars led by Edd Roush and Heinie Groh while the pitching staff was led by Hod Eller and Harry "Slim" Sallee, a left-hander. The Reds finished ahead of John McGraw's New York Giants, and then won the world championship in 8 games over the Chicago White Sox.

By 1920, the "Black Sox" scandal had brought a taint to the Reds' first championship. In the remainder of the 1920s and early 1930s the Reds were second division dwellers for most of those years. Eppa Rixey, Dolf Luque and Pete Donohue were pitching stars; the offense never quite lived up to the pitching. By 1931 the team was bankrupt, thanks to the Great Depression, and Redland Field was in a state of disrepair.

== 1933–1940: Revival of 1930s ==
Powel Crosley Jr., an electronics magnate who, with his brother Lewis M. Crosley, produced radios, refrigerators, and other household items, bought the Reds out of bankruptcy in 1933, and hired Larry MacPhail to be the General Manager. Powel Crosley Jr. had also started WLW radio and the Crosley Broadcasting Corporation in Cincinnati and was doing quite well as a civic leader. (WLW has been the Reds' radio flagship for decades.) MacPhail began to develop the Reds' minor league system and expanded the Reds' base. The Reds, throughout the 1930s, became a team of "firsts". Crosley Field, (formerly Redland Field), became the host of the first night game in 1935. Johnny Vander Meer became the only pitcher in major league history to throw back-to-back no-hitters in 1938. Thanks to Vander Meer, Paul Derringer, and infielder-turned-pitcher Bucky Walters, the Reds had a solid pitching staff. The offense came around in the late 1930s. Ernie Lombardi was named the National League's Most Valuable Player in 1938, First baseman Frank McCormick was the 1940 NL MVP. Other position players included Harry Craft, Lonny Frey, Ival Goodman and Lew Riggs. By 1938 the Reds, now led by manager Bill McKechnie, were out of the second division finishing fourth. By 1939 they were National League champions. The Reds were swept by the New York Yankees in four straight. In 1940, they repeated as NL Champions, and for the first time in 21 years, the Reds captured a World championship, beating the Detroit Tigers 4 games to 3.

== 1941–1969: Kluszewski, Robinson, and the beginnings of a machine ==
World War II and age finally caught up with the Reds. Throughout the remainder of the 1940s and the early 1950s, Cincinnati finished mostly in the second division. In 1944, Joe Nuxhall, (who was later to become part of the radio broadcasting team), at age 15, pitching for the Reds on loan from a Hamilton, Ohio Junior High School, became the youngest person ever to play in a major league game—a record that still stands today. Ewell "The Whip" Blackwell was the main pitching stalwart before arm problems cut short his career. Ted Kluszewski was the NL home run leader in 1954. The rest of the offense was a collection of over-the-hill players and not-ready-for-prime-time youngsters.

During 1954, the Reds changed their name to the Redlegs in response to the Second Red Scare and the height of the Communism movement. The name change never really caught on, and was reversed prior to the 1959 season.

In 1956, led by National League Rookie of the Year Frank Robinson, the Reds hit 221 HR to tie the NL record. The 1957 season brought two tough moments. The first caught Reds fans stuffing ballot boxes by having seven Reds in the All-Star Game. As a result, voting was banned until the 1970s. Around this time, the Dodgers and Giants left New York in favor of California. There were talks of moving the Reds or another National League club to New York. The maturation of Robinson and other players, increasing attendance in Cincinnati and a proposed third major league (which in turn prompted the established leagues to add four expansion teams including a replacement NL franchise for New York) halted those talks.

By 1961, Robinson was joined by Vada Pinson, Wally Post, Gordy Coleman and Gene Freese. Pitchers Joey Jay, Jim O'Toole, and Bob Purkey led the staff. The newly renamed Reds captured the 1961 National League pennant, holding off the Los Angeles Dodgers and the San Francisco Giants, only to be defeated by the perennially powerful New York Yankees in the World Series. The Reds had many successful teams during the rest of the 1960s, but did not produce any championships. They won 98 games in 1962 (paced by Purkey's 23), but finished third. In 1964, they lost the pennant by one game, having taken 1st place when the Phillies collapsed in September but then losing out to the Cardinals. In that 1964 season, the beloved leader of the Reds, manager Fred Hutchinson, died of cancer, succumbing just weeks after the end of the 1964 season, one of baseball's most exciting pennant races ever. The failure of the Reds to win the 1964 pennant led to owner Bill DeWitt's selling off key components of the team, in anticipation of relocating the franchise. After the 1965 season he executed what may be the most lopsided trade in baseball history, sending former Most-Valuable Player Frank Robinson to the Baltimore Orioles for pitchers Milt Pappas, Jack Baldschun, and outfielder Dick Simpson. Robinson went on to win the MVP in the American league for 1966, win the "triple crown", and lead Baltimore to its first ever World Series title in a four-game sweep of the Los Angeles Dodgers. The Reds did not recover from this trade until the rise of the "Big Red Machine" of the 1970s.

Starting in the early 1960s, the Reds' farm system began producing a series of future stars, such as Jim Maloney (the Reds pitching ace of the 1960s), Pete Rose, Tony Pérez, Johnny Bench (a great catcher and the backbone of the Reds for years to come), Lee May, Tommy Helms, Bernie Carbo, Hal McRae, Dave Concepción, and Gary Nolan. The tipping point came in 1967 with the appointment of Bob Howsam as general manager. Howsam pulled two key trades to complement the Reds' bats. The first brought in outfielder Alex Johnson who would return to form after some years with the Phillies. The second traded veteran Vada Pinson to St. Louis for the speedy Bobby Tolan. Around this time, the Reds avoided an all but certain move to San Diego when the city of Cincinnati and Hamilton County agreed to build a new, state of the art, downtown stadium on the edge of the Ohio River. The Reds entered into a 30-year lease in exchange for the stadium commitment keeping the franchise in its original home city. In a series of strategic moves, Howsam nurtured the homegrown talent and brought in key personnel, allowing the team to finally reach its potential during the 1970s. The Reds' final game at Crosley Field, home to more than 4,500 baseball games, were played on June 24, 1970, a 5–4 victory over the San Francisco Giants. In its place, a new stadium, and a new Reds dynasty.

== How to groom the Big Red Machine ==
Under Bob Howsam's administration starting in the late 1960s, the Reds instituted a strict rule barring the team's players from wearing mustaches, beards, and long hair. (This rule, with a mustache exemption, is also enforced to this day by the New York Yankees.) The clean cut look was meant to present the team as wholesome and traditional in an era of turmoil. Over the years, the rule was controversial, but persisted under the ownership of Marge Schott. All players coming to the Reds were required to shave and cut their hair for the next three decades or more. On at least one occasion, in the early 1980s, when the Reds were hurting for pitching, strict enforcement of this rule lost them the services of star reliever Rollie Fingers, who would not shave his trademark handlebar moustache in order to join the team. The Reds thus took a pass on Fingers. When Pete Rose became player-manager in the mid-1980s, he grew a "rat's tail", fashionable among the youth of the time, but the rule was not officially rescinded until 1999 when the Reds traded for slugger Greg Vaughn who had a goatee.

The Reds' grooming rules also included guidelines for wearing the uniform. In major league baseball, a club generally provides most of the equipment and clothing needed for play. However, players are required to supply their gloves and shoes themselves. Many players take advantage of this rule by entering into sponsorship arrangements with shoe manufacturers. Through the mid-1980s, the Reds had a strict rule that players were to wear only plain black shoes with no prominent logo. Reds players decried the boring color choice as well as the denial of the opportunity to earn more money through shoe contracts. A compromise was struck in which players were given the opportunity to wear red shoes.

For years, club management and players throughout Major League Baseball have been involved in a struggle over how uniform pants and stockings are to be worn. Generally, baseball players wear a double layer of socks—underneath, the regular socks or "sanitaries" (traditionally plain white) and over that, a stirrup-type stocking (traditionally bearing team colors). Some clubs, such as the Reds, require that the pants and socks be worn so that the team colors on the stirrup are visible. However, since the 1990s, players have generally preferred to pull down the cuffs of their trousers all the way to the ankle, thus covering up the colored stockings.

== 1970–1976: The Big Red Machine era ==
=== 1970–1971: 102 victories and two big trades ===
In 1970, little known George "Sparky" Anderson was hired as manager, and the Reds embarked upon a decade of excellence, with a team that came to be known as "The Big Red Machine". Playing at Crosley Field until June 30, 1970, when they moved into brand-new Riverfront Stadium, a 52,000 seat multi-purpose venue on the shores of the Ohio River, the Reds began the 1970s with a bang by winning 70 of their first 100 games. Johnny Bench, Tony Pérez, Pete Rose, Lee May and Bobby Tolan were the early Red Machine offensive leaders; Gary Nolan, Jim Merritt Jim Maloney and Jim McGlothlin led a pitching staff which also contained veterans Tony Cloninger and Clay Carroll and youngsters Wayne Simpson and Don Gullett. The Reds breezed through the 1970 season, won the NL West and captured the NL pennant by sweeping the Pittsburgh Pirates in three games. By time the club got to the World Series, however, the Reds pitching staff had run out of gas and the veteran Baltimore Orioles beat the Reds in five games.

After the disastrous 1971 season (the second season between 1961 and 1981 during which the Reds finished with a losing record) the Reds reloaded by trading veterans Jimmy Stewart, May, and Tommy Helms for Joe Morgan, César Gerónimo, Jack Billingham, Ed Armbrister, and Denis Menke. Meanwhile, Dave Concepción blossomed at shortstop. 1971 was also the year a key component of the future world championships was acquired in George Foster from the San Francisco Giants in a trade for shortstop Frank Duffy.

=== 1972–1974: Enter Joe Morgan ===
The 1972 Reds won the NL West in MLB's first ever strike-shortened season and defeated the Pittsburgh Pirates in a five-game playoff series—that fifth game in Cincinnati was the last major league game Pittsburgh's Roberto Clemente ever played—then faced the Oakland Athletics in the World Series. Six of the seven games were won by one run. With slugger Reggie Jackson sidelined due to an injury incurred during Oakland's playoff series against the Detroit Tigers, Ohio native Gene Tenace got a chance to play in the series for manager Dick Williams, delivering four home runs that tied the World Series record for homers, propelling Oakland to a dramatic seventh game series win. This was the first World Series in which no starting pitcher for either side pitched a complete game.

The Reds won a third NL West crown in 1973 after a dramatic second half comeback, that saw them make up 10 1/2 games on the Los Angeles Dodgers after the All-Star break. However, they lost the NL pennant to the New York Mets in five games. In game one, Tom Seaver faced Jack Billingham in a classic pitching duo, with all three runs of the 2–1 margin being scored on home runs. John Milner provided New York's run off Billingham, while Pete Rose tied the game in the seventh inning off Seaver, setting the stage for a dramatic game ending home run by Johnny Bench in the bottom of the ninth inning. The New York series provided plenty of controversy with the riotous behavior of Shea Stadium fans towards Pete Rose when he and Bud Harrelson scuffled after a hard slide by Rose into Harrelson at second base during the fifth inning of Game 3. A bench-clearing fight resulted. The resulting on-field tension led to two separate incidents in which play was stopped. The Reds trailed 9–3 and New York's manager, Yogi Berra, and legendary outfielder Willie Mays at the request of National League president Warren Giles appealed to fans in left field to restrain themselves. The next day the series was extended to a fifth game when Rose homered in the 12th inning to tie the series at two games each.

The 1974 season started off with much excitement, as the Atlanta Braves were in town to open the season with the Reds. Hank Aaron entered opening day with 713 home runs, one shy of tying Babe Ruth's record of 714. On a three ball one strike count, the first pitch Aaron swung at in the 74 season was the record tying home run off Jack Billingham. The next day the Braves benched Aaron, hoping to save him for his record-breaking home run on their season opening homestand. The commissioner of baseball, Bowie Kuhn, ordered Braves management to play Aaron the next day, where he narrowly missed the historic home run in the fifth inning. Aaron went on to set the record in Atlanta two nights later off Al Downing and the Los Angeles Dodgers. 1974 also was the debut of Marty Brennaman, who replaced Al Michaels, after Michaels left the Reds to broadcast for the San Francisco Giants. However, the Reds would win 98 games in 1974, finishing second to MVP Steve Garvey and the Los Angeles Dodgers.

=== 1975–1976: The Great Eight win back-to-back titles ===
With 1975, the Big Red Machine lineup solidified with the starting team of Johnny Bench (c), Tony Pérez (1b), Joe Morgan (2b), Dave Concepción (ss), Pete Rose (3b), Ken Griffey (rf), César Gerónimo (cf), and George Foster (lf). The starting pitchers included Don Gullett, Fred Norman, Gary Nolan, Jack Billingham, Pat Darcy, and Clay Kirby. However, it was the bullpen that was the key to the Reds' pitching (and Anderson's reputation as "Captain Hook") with Rawly Eastwick and Will McEnaney as the key closers with a combined 37 saves. Pedro Borbón and Clay Carroll filled in as stretchers between the starters and the finishers. However, this was not the lineup on Opening Day. At that time, Rose still played in left field and Foster was not a starter, while John Vukovich, an off-season acquisition from the Milwaukee Brewers was the starting third baseman, replacing Dan Driessen, who was a decent hitter, but whose defensive skills were considered a weakness. While Vuckovich was a superb defensive shortstop, he was a weak hitter, as was the declining Denis Menke. In May, with the team off to a slow start and trailing the Dodgers, Sparky Anderson made a bold move by moving Rose to third base (a position where he had very little experience) and inserting Foster in left field to bat cleanup. This was the jolt that the Reds needed to propel them into first place, with Rose proving to be reliable on defense, while adding Foster to the outfield gave the offense some added punch. During the season, the Reds compiled two notable streaks: (1) by winning 41 out of 50 games in one stretch, and (2) by going a month without committing any errors on defense.

In the 1975 season, Cincinnati clinched the NL West with 108 victories, 20 games ahead of the Los Angeles Dodgers, then swept the Pittsburgh Pirates in three games to win the NL pennant. In the World Series, the Boston Red Sox were the opponents. After splitting the first four games, the Reds took Game 5. After a three-day rain delay, the two teams met in Game 6, one of the most memorable baseball games ever played and considered by many to be the best World Series game ever. The Reds were ahead 6–3 with 5 outs left, when the Red Sox tied the game on former Red Bernie Carbo's three-run home run. It was Carbo's second pinch-hit three-run homer in the series. After a few close-calls either way, Carlton Fisk hit a dramatic 12th inning home run off the foul pole in left field (which is considered to be one of the greatest TV sports moments of all time) to give the Red Sox a 7–6 win and force a deciding Game 7. Cincinnati prevailed the next day when Morgan's RBI single won Game 7 and gave the Reds their first championship in 35 years.

1976 saw a return of the same starting eight in the field. The starting rotation was led by Gary Nolan. The remaining starters, Don Gullett, Jack Billingham, Pat Zachry, Santo Alcala, and Fred Norman comprised an underrated staff in which four of the six had ERAs below 3.10. Rawly Eastwick, Pedro Borbón, and Will McEnaney shared closer duties, recording 26, 8, and 7 saves respectively.

In 1976, the Reds won the NL West by ten games over the archrival Dodgers. They went undefeated in the postseason, sweeping the Philadelphia Phillies (winning Game 3 in their final at-bat) to return to the World Series. They continued to dominate by sweeping the Yankees in the newly renovated Yankee Stadium, the first World Series games played in Yankee Stadium since 1964. This was only the second ever sweep of the proud Yankees in the World Series. In winning the Series, the Reds became the first NL team since the 1921–22 New York Giants to win back-to-back World Series championships.

The Big Red Machine was also part of the rivalry between the Philadelphia Phillies and the Pittsburgh Pirates. The Reds won all their four pennants in the 1970s against both the Pennsylvania-based teams. Pete Rose would add further fuel to The Big Red Machine being part of the rivalry when he signed with the Phillies in 1979 and helped them win their first ever World Series in 1980.

== 1977–1989: The end of the Machine, the Return and Banishment of Rose ==
=== 1977–1981 ===
Personnel changes were in the offing. Popular Tony Pérez was sent to Montreal after the 1976 season, breaking up the Big Red Machine's starting lineup. Starting pitcher Don Gullett left via free agency and signed with the New York Yankees. In an effort to fill that gap, a trade with the Oakland A's for starting ace Vida Blue was arranged during the '76–'77 off-season. However, Bowie Kuhn, the Commissioner of Baseball at the time, vetoed this trade in an effort to maintain the competitive balance in baseball. On June 15, 1977, the Reds entered the trading market with a vengeance. New York was heartbroken by the news that the Mets' franchise pitcher Tom Seaver was being traded to the Reds in a multiple-player deal for Pat Zachry, Doug Flynn, Steve Henderson, and Dan Norman. In less successful deals, the Reds also traded Gary Nolan to the Angels for Craig Hendrickson, Rawly Eastwick to St. Louis for Doug Capilla and Mike Caldwell to Milwaukee for Dick O'Keefe and Garry Pyka, and got Rick Auerbach from Texas. The end of the Big Red Machine era was heralded by the replacement of General Manager Bob Howsam with Dick Wagner. After the 1978 season, Cincinnati hero Pete Rose, who since 1963 had played almost every position for the team except pitcher and catcher, signed with Philadelphia as a free agent. In Rose's last season as a Red, he gave baseball a thrill as he challenged Joe DiMaggio's 56-game hitting streak, tying for the second longest streak ever at 44 games. The streak came to an end in Atlanta after striking out in his 5th at bat in the game against Gene Garber. Rose also earned his 3000th hit that season, on his way to becoming baseball's all-time hits leader when he rejoined the Reds in the mid-1980s. The year also witnessed the only no-hitter of pitcher Tom Seaver's career, coming against the St. Louis Cardinals on June 16, 1978.

The later years of the 1970s brought turmoil and change. After two consecutive runner-up seasons, Wagner fired manager Anderson. By 1979, players Gullett, Nolan, Pérez, and Rose, among others, had left the club. By 1979, the starters included Bench (c), Dan Driessen (1b), Morgan (2b), Concepción (ss), and Ray Knight (3b), with Griffey, Foster, and Geronimo again in the outfield. The pitching staff had experienced an almost complete turnover. The ace starter was now Seaver. Only Norman was left from 1975 to 1976; the remaining starters were Mike La Coss, Bill Bonham, and Paul Moskau. In the bullpen, only Borbon had remained. Dave Tomlin and Mario Soto worked mid-innings with Tom Hume and Doug Bair closing.

The Reds did manage to win the 1979 NL West behind the pitching of Tom Seaver but were dispatched in the NL playoffs by Pittsburgh, after a controversial play in Game 2 in which a ball hit by Pittsburgh's Phil Garner was caught by Cincinnati outfielder Dave Collins but was ruled a trap, setting the Pirates up to take a 2–1 lead. The Pirates swept the series 3 games to 0. After the season ended, Joe Morgan returned to the Astros. Ironically, the Reds would lose the NL West to those Astros in 1980, despite Dave Collins stealing 79 bases.

The 1981 team fielded a strong lineup, with only Concepción, Foster, and Griffey retaining their spots from the 1975–76 heyday. Johnny Bench broke his ankle and so Joe Nolan played the majority of games behind the plate. Driessen and Knight still played the corners, but Morgan and Geronimo had been replaced at second base and center field by Ron Oester and Dave Collins. Mario Soto posted a banner year starting on the mound, even surpassing the performance of Seaver. La Coss, Bruce Berenyi, and Frank Pastore rounded out the starting rotation. Hume again led the bullpen as closer, joined by Bair, Moskau, Joe Price, and Geoff Combe.

In 1981, Cincinnati had the best overall record in baseball, but they finished second in the division in both of the half-seasons that were created after a mid-season players' strike. To commemorate this, a team photo was taken, accompanied by a banner that read "Baseball's Best Record 1981". By 1982, the Reds were a shell of the original Red Machine; they lost 100 games that year for the first time in team history. Johnny Bench retired a year later.

=== The 1980s ===
After the heartbreak of 1981, General Manager Dick Wagner pursued the controversial strategy of ridding the team of pricey veterans, stars, and proven winners, ridding the roster of catcher Nolan, third-baseman Knight (who had adequately replaced the unreplaceable Pete Rose) and the entire starting outfield of Griffey, Foster, and Collins. Johnny Bench decided to give up catching entirely and was made the starting third baseman; Alex Treviño became the regular starting catcher. The outfield was staffed with Paul Householder, César Cedeño, and the untried Eddie Milner. The starting rotation still featured the strong Seaver and Soto, joined by Pastore and Bruce Berenyi, but their efforts were wasted without a strong offensive lineup backing them. Tom Hume still led the bullpen, but he had no support from the dismal relieving of Ben Hayes, Brad "The Animal" Lesley, Joe Price, and Jim Kern.

The Reds fell to the bottom of the Western Division during the 1982 and 1983 seasons (with the team losing 100 games for the first time in the former season), losing Seaver after the 1982 season. A series of desultory changes were made – Dann Bilardello behind the plate, Nick Esasky taking over for Bench at third base, and Gary Redus taking over for Cedeno in left field. Tom Hume had pitched himself out and there was not a body in the bullpen worth naming. Dave Concepción was the sole remaining starter from the Big Red Machine era.

The unpopular Wagner's control of the Reds ended in 1983, when Howsam, the architect of the Big Red Machine, was brought back and began his return by acquiring Cincinnati native Dave Parker from Pittsburgh. In 1984 the Reds began to improve, depending on trades and some minor leaguers. In that season Dave Parker, Dave Concepción and Tony Pérez were in Cincinnati uniforms. In August 1984, Pete Rose was hired as player-manager. After raising the franchise from the grave, Howsam gave way to the administration of Bill Bergesch, who was principally known for holding on tightly to perennial future stars such as Kurt Stillwell, Tracy Jones, Kal Daniels, and others, refusing to risk these "crown jewels" for pitching help.

Under Bergesch, during 1985–1989 the Reds finished second four times. Among the highlights, Rose became the all-time hits leader, Tom Browning threw a perfect game, and Chris Sabo was the 1988 National League Rookie of the Year. The Reds also had a bullpen star in John Franco, who was with the team from 1984 to 1989. In 1989, Rose was banned from baseball by Commissioner Bart Giamatti, who declared Rose guilty of "conduct detrimental to baseball". Controversy also swirled around Reds owner Marge Schott, who was accused several times of ethnic and racial slurs.

== 1990–2002: A world title and the end of an era ==
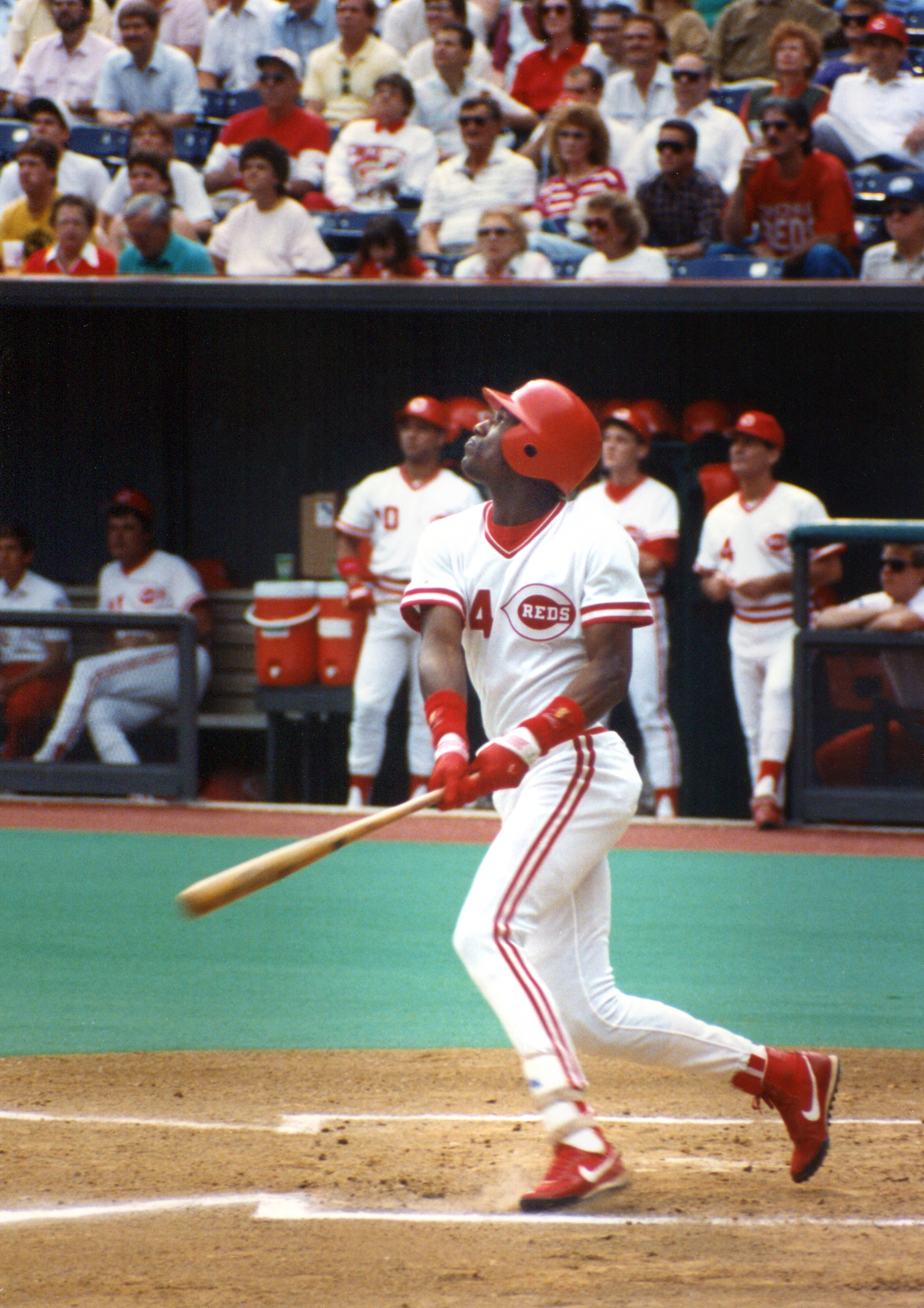
Eric Davis in 1990

=== 1990: A wire-to-wire World Championship season ===
In 1987, General Manager Bill Bergesch was replaced by Murray Cook, who initiated a series of deals that would finally return the Reds to prominence. With Barry Larkin now as full-time shortstop, the Reds traded Kurt Stillwell to the Kansas City Royals for pitcher Danny Jackson, who would respond by winning 23 games in 1988. Reliever John Franco was traded to the New York Mets for reliever Randy Myers. A Bergesch favorite, veteran Dave Parker, was traded to the Oakland Athletics for young pitcher José Rijo. After the 1989 season, another trade brought first baseman Hal Morris from the New York Yankees. The Reds also hired former Yankee player and manager Lou Piniella as their manager.

Under Piniella, the Reds in 1990 shocked baseball by leading the NL West wire to wire. They started the season 33–12, winning their first 9 games, and maintained their lead in the West throughout the year. Led by a lineup of Chris Sabo, Barry Larkin, Eric Davis, Paul O'Neill, and Billy Hatcher; starting pitchers Danny Jackson, José Rijo, and Tom Browning; and a bullpen led by the "Nasty Boys" of Rob Dibble, Norm Charlton and Randy Myers, the Reds defeated the Pirates in the NLCS and swept the heavily favored Oakland Athletics in four straight games, which extended the franchise's World Series winning streak to nine consecutive games. The World Series, however, was costly, as Eric Davis severely bruised a kidney diving for a fly ball in the first inning of Game 4.

=== 1991–92: The end of the classic uniforms ===
The 1991 season was disappointing to Cincinnati, only winning 74 games and losing 88, the most losses by a reigning Series champion until the dismantled 1998 Florida Marlins lost 108. In 1992, Quinn was replaced in the front office by Jim Bowden. Bowden would trade outfielder Eric Davis to the Los Angeles Dodgers for pitcher Tim Belcher. On the field, manager Lou Piniella wanted outfielder Paul O'Neill to be his premier power-hitter to fill the void left by Eric Davis after he was traded to the Los Angeles Dodgers. Despite O'Neill's poor performance in his new role (he only hit .246 with 14 home runs), the Reds won 90 games in 1992. The 90 wins were good enough for second place in the National League West as the Atlanta Braves charged their way to the division title and a second consecutive National League Pennant. One of the low points of the season came when Piniella got into an altercation with "Nasty Boy" Rob Dibble. That coupled with O'Neill's trade to the New York Yankees for outfielder Roberto Kelly put a huge damper on the Reds season. The long-term effects of the O'Neill/Kelly trade were even worse as Kelly would only be in a Reds uniform for a few years, while O'Neill wound up being a leader for the great New York Yankee teams from the mid-to-late 1990s. The Reds would also replace their "Big Red Machine" era uniforms after 1992 season for a sleeveless look, reminiscing the Reds' days in the 1960s.

=== 1993–1999: The return of the vests ===
Before 1993 season manager Lou Piniella was replaced by fan favorite Tony Pérez. Pérez's reign would be short-lived though as he only lasted only 44 games at the helm. Pérez was replaced by Davey Johnson, who had led the New York Mets to a World Championship in 1986. With Johnson steering the team, the Reds made steady progress upward. In 1994, the Reds were in the newly created National League Central Division with the Chicago Cubs, St. Louis Cardinals, Pittsburgh Pirates and Houston Astros. By the time the 1994 strike hit, the Reds were a half-game ahead of the Astros for first place in the division.

1995 saw the Reds win the National League Central led by shortstop and NL MVP Barry Larkin. After defeating the Western Division Champion Los Angeles Dodgers in the first NLDS since 1981, they were demolished in 4 games by the Eastern Division Champion Atlanta Braves in the NLCS.

That season also saw one of the most bizarre moves in team history, as eccentric team owner Marge Schott announced in the middle of the season that Johnson would be gone by the end of the year, regardless of outcome, to be replaced by former Reds third baseman Ray Knight. Schott did not approve of Johnson living with his fiancée before they were married. Knight, along with his wife, professional golfer Nancy Lopez, were personal friends of Schott's. The team took a dive under Knight as he was unable to complete two full seasons as manager. Ironically Knight was the starting third baseman for the World Champion 1986 Mets; whom were managed by Johnson.

Knight was replaced by Jack McKeon and by 1999 the Reds won 96 games and were contending for a playoff spot. After the season ended the Reds found themselves tied with the New York Mets for the National League Wild Card. The Mets, led by a brilliant pitching performance by Al Leiter won a one-game playoff at Cinergy Field and ended the Reds' season. The end of this game will be remembered by many as former Reds closer John Franco, who was traded to the Mets for Randy Myers before the 1990 season, ran wildly around the field celebrating the first playoff berth of his career.

== 2003–present: Great American Ball Park opens ==
After the 2002 season Cinergy Field was demolished to make way for the new Great American Ball Park. The demolition of the Reds' most successful home field severed the last tie to the team's "Big Red Machine" era.

Great American Ball Park opened in 2003, with high expectations for a team led by local favorites, including outfielder Ken Griffey Jr., shortstop Barry Larkin, reliever Danny Graves and first baseman Sean Casey. Although attendance improved considerably with the new ballpark, the team continued to lose. After years of promises that the club was rebuilding toward the opening of the new ballpark, General Manager Jim Bowden and manager Bob Boone were fired on July 28. This broke up the father-son combo of manager Bob Boone and third baseman Aaron Boone. Aaron was soon traded to the New York Yankees, where he would hit the series-winning home run of the 2003 ALCS over the Boston Red Sox. Following the season Dan O'Brien was hired as the Reds' 16th General Manager.

=== 2004–2005 ===
The 2004 and 2005 seasons continued the trend of big hitting, poor pitching, and ultimately poor records for the Reds. Ken Griffey Jr. joined the 500-home run club in 2004, giving Reds fans one of the few highlights of his injury-plagued stay in Cincinnati. Adam Dunn emerged as formidable home run hitter, hitting a 535-foot (163 m) home run against José Lima. Dunn's power was offset by his inconsistency at times also as he broke the single-season major league record for strikeouts in 2004. The Reds were quickly in last place to begin the 2005 season, costing manager Dave Miley his job. Miley was replaced by Jerry Narron. Like many other small market clubs, the Reds dispatched some of their veteran players and began entrusting their future to a young nucleus that included Dunn, Ryan Freel, and Aaron Harang.

=== 2006–2009: Enter Bob Castellini ===
In 2006, a new era in Reds baseball began as Robert Castellini took over as owner, assuming control of the team from Carl Lindner. Castinelli promptly fired general manager Dan O'Brien. Wayne Krivsky, previously an assistant General Manager with the Minnesota Twins, and a candidate for the job when O'Brien was hired, was appointed as the General Manager of the Reds after a protracted search. The first move Krivsky made was to trade young outfielder Wily Mo Peña to the Boston Red Sox for pitcher Bronson Arroyo. Arroyo made his first start in a Reds uniform on April 5, 2006. He not only earned the win, but also led off the third inning with his first career home run. Krivsky also gave fans hope with mid-season trades that bolstered the "non-existent" bullpen, trading for Eddie Guardado and then trading outfielder Austin Kearns, shortstop Felipe López, and 2004 first-round draft pick Ryan Wagner to the Washington Nationals for relievers Gary Majewski and Bill Bray, shortstop Royce Clayton, and two prospects. This move was controversial, as not only did it seem as if the Reds did not receive much in return for two starting position players and a former first-round draft pick, but also it was later discovered that the Nationals may have hidden Majewski's health problems.

For Opening Day 2006, President George W. Bush threw out the ceremonial first pitch, becoming the first sitting president to throw out the first pitch at a Reds game.

The 2007 season was a great disappointment for the Reds when they finished in fifth place (72–90). One of the bright spots of the season was the emergence of young second baseman Brandon Phillips. Despite many fans' perception that interim manager Pete Mackanin might be a good fit as manager, the Reds made a bold move toward winning and hired three-time National League Manager of the Year Dusty Baker to guide the Reds in the 2008 season.

The 2008 season had high expectations since Dusty Baker usually turned teams around during their first years (evident with the 1993 San Francisco Giants who went 103–59 after going 72–90 the previous season, and the 2003 Chicago Cubs when they won the Central Division after finishing under .500 in 2002). However, the Reds would fall short by going 74–88 and finishing in fifth once again. There were some bright spots in the season despite the bad finish. In his first start, pitcher Johnny Cueto would strike out ten Arizona Diamondbacks. The next month, rookie outfielder Jay Bruce would make his debut by delivering several walk-off victories for the Reds. The 2009 season saw little improvement in Cincinnati, as the team went 78–84.

=== 2010–2013: New success ===
The Reds made a big splash on January 10, 2010, when they signed Cuban pitching phenom Aroldis Chapman to a six-year, $30.25 million contract. Chapman made his major league debut in August, and on September 24, he threw the fastest recorded pitch in MLB history, a 105.1 mph fastball. In 2010, first baseman Joey Votto was named the National League MVP in a near-unanimous vote, and the Reds went 91–71 to win the NL Central crown and their first postseason berth since 1995. In the NLDS, the Reds were swept by the Philadelphia Phillies and in Game 1 were no-hit by Roy Halladay, becoming the second team in history to be the victim of a postseason no-hitter.

The 2011 season saw the Reds descend back into mediocrity with a 79–83 record. They rebounded in 2012 with a 97–65 record, their best since 1981, and finished first in the NL Central. They were defeated three games to two in the NLDS by the eventual World Series champion San Francisco Giants. The Reds returned to the postseason in 2013 with a 90–72 record and the second NL wild card spot, becoming the first team in history to reach the postseason after finishing third in their division. They lost the Wild Card Game to the Pittsburgh Pirates. Dusty Baker was fired as the Reds' manager after their loss in the Wild Card Game and was replaced by pitching coach Bryan Price.

=== 2014–2018: Rebuilding under Price ===
The Reds' first year under Price was a disappointment, as they went 76–86 and finished fourth in the NL Central. The bright spot on the team was ace pitcher Johnny Cueto, who led the National League with 242 strikeouts and finished second in NL Cy Young Award voting behind Clayton Kershaw of the Dodgers.

After the 2014 season, the Reds finished last in the NL Central for four consecutive years from 2015 to 2018, never winning more than 68 games in that span. During this time, the Reds decided to rebuild and traded away Johnny Cueto, Aroldis Chapman, and Jay Bruce. In the 2018 season, after the Reds lost 15 of their first 18 games, Price was fired and replaced by Jim Riggleman. After 2018, the Reds hired David Bell as their new manager.

=== 2019–present: Return to the postseason and struggles ===
In Bell's first year as the Reds' manager, the team went 75–87 to place fourth in the NL Central. In the 2020 season, which was shortened to 60 games due to the COVID-19 pandemic, the Reds went 31–29 to clinch their first postseason berth and first winning season since 2013. They would be defeated in the first round of the expanded postseason by the Atlanta Braves. In 2021, the Reds went 83–79 and finished third in the NL Central. In 2022, the Reds lost 22 of their first 25 games, one of the worst starts to a season in the last 100 years, comparing with teams like the 1988 Baltimore Orioles and the 1997 Chicago Cubs. The Reds went on to lose 100 games for the first time in since 1982 (and for the second time in their history) and tied with the Pittsburgh Pirates for last place in the NL Central.
