= Troy Trojans all-time roster =

List of baseball players

The Troy Trojans were a professional baseball team that played in the National League from 1879 to 1882. During their four seasons in existence, the team had a record of 134-191.

== Players ==
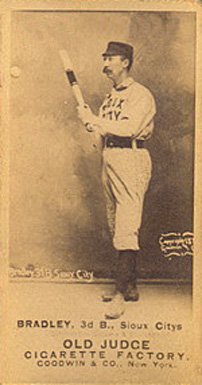
Pitcher George Bradley

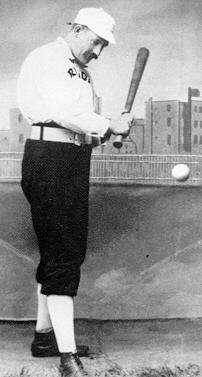
First baseman Dan Brouthers

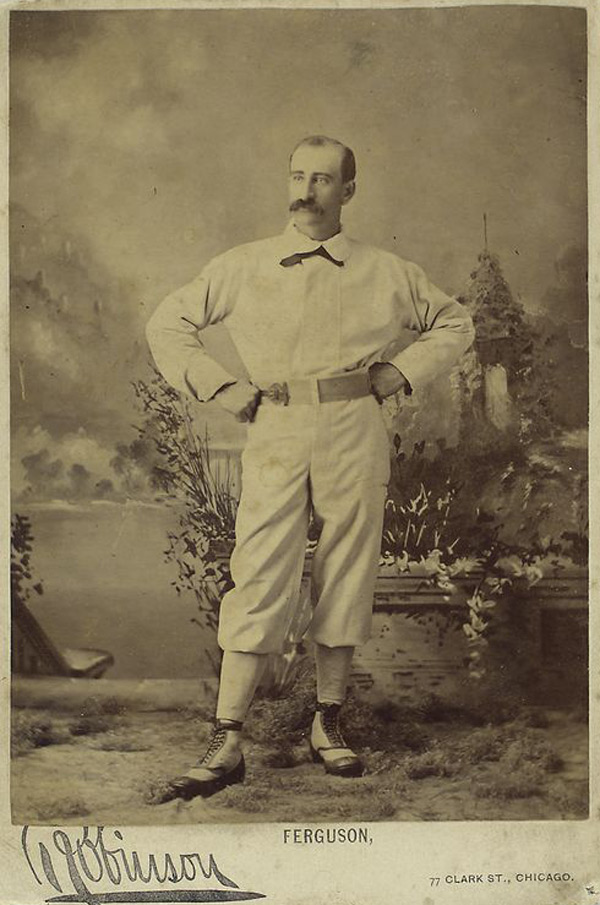
Second baseman Bob Ferguson

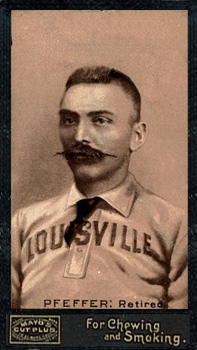
Shortstop Fred Pfeffer

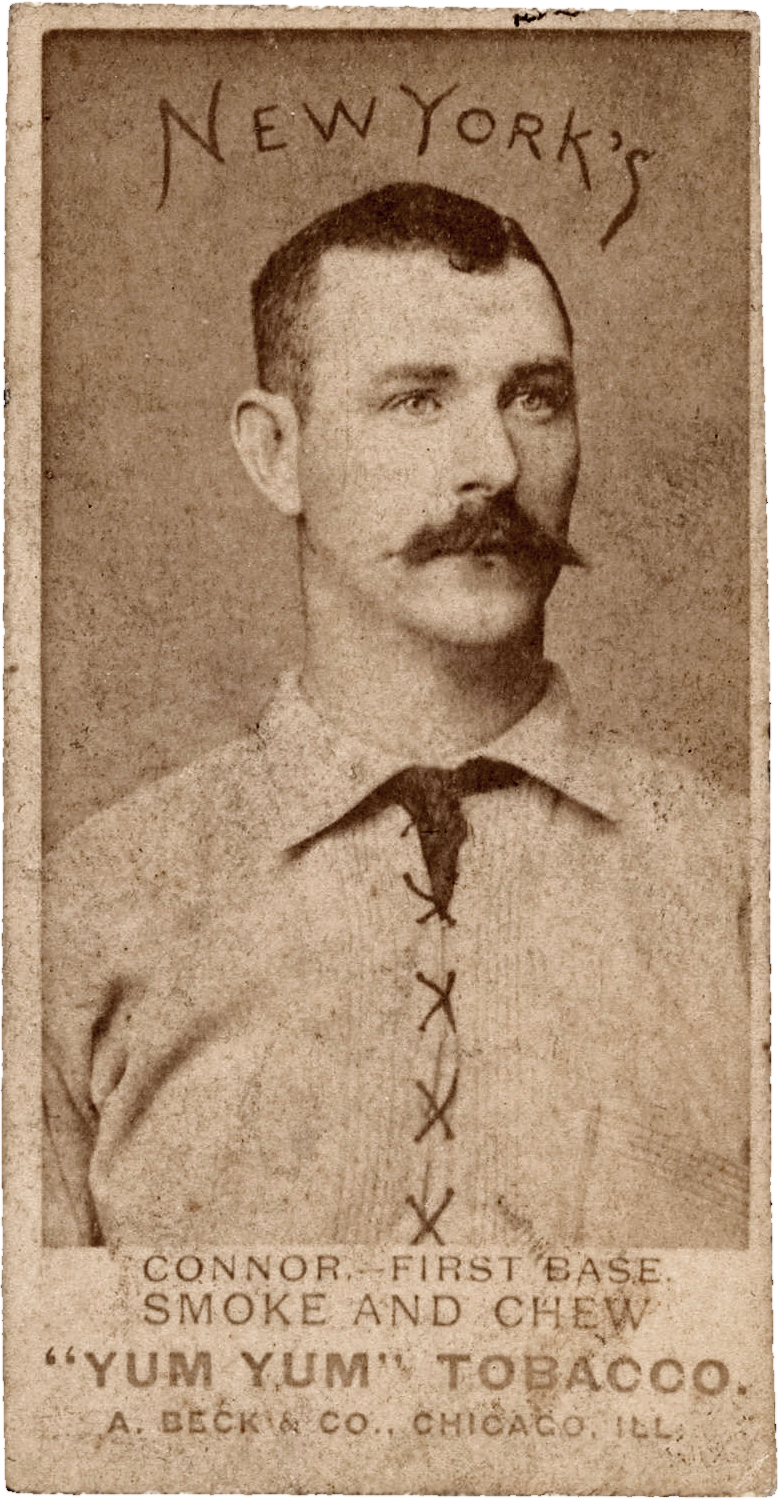
First baseman Roger Connor

Key to symbols in player table
*	Player was a player-manager
†	Inducted into the National Baseball Hall of Fame and Museum

Players who played for the Troy Trojans, primary position played, and season(s) played for franchise
Player	Position(s)	Season(s)	Notes	Ref
William Ahearn	Catcher	1880		
George Bradley	Pitcher	1879	Bradley led the Trojans in wins, strikeouts, runs scored, and RBI in 1879.	
Fatty Briody	Catcher	1880		
Dan Brouthers^{†}	First baseman	1879–1880	Brouthers led the Trojans in batting average in 1879.	
Ed Caskin	Shortstop	1879–1881		
John Cassidy	Center fielder	1879–1882	Cassidy led the Trojans in runs scored in 1881.	
Aaron Clapp	First baseman	1879		
Ed Cogswell	First baseman	1880		
Roger Connor^{†}	First baseman	1880–1882	Connor led the Trojans in batting average in 1880, 1881, and 1882 and RBI in 1880.	
Buttercup Dickerson	Center fielder	1880		
Herm Doscher	Third baseman	1879		
Jim Egan	Center fielder / Pitcher	1882		
Jake Evans	Right fielder	1879–1881		
Buck Ewing^{†}	Catcher / Third baseman	1880–1882	Ewing led the Trojans in runs scored in 1882.	
Bob Ferguson*	Second baseman	1879–1882	Ferguson led the Trojans in runs scored in 1880.	
Gid Gardner	Pitcher	1879		
Patrick Gillespie	Left fielder	1880–1882	Gillespie led the Trojans in RBI in 1881.	
Fred Goldsmith	Pitcher	1879		
James Haley	Catcher	1880		
Al Hall	Center fielder	1879		
Frank Hankinson	Third baseman	1881		
Bill Harbridge	Center fielder	1880, 1882		
Thorny Hawkes	Second baseman	1879		
Dick Higham	Catcher / Right fielder	1880		
Bill Holbert	Catcher	1879–1882		
Jim Holdsworth	Center fielder	1882		
Tim Keefe^{†}	Pitcher	1880–1882	Keefe led the Trojans in wins and strikeouts in 1882.	
Kick Kelly	Catcher / Right fielder	1879		
Terry Larkin	Pitcher	1880		
Mike Lawlor	Catcher	1880		
Tom Mansell	Left fielder	1879		
Pat McManus	Pitcher	1879		
Frank Mountain	Pitcher	1880		
Candy Nelson	Shortstop	1879		
Fred Pfeffer	Shortstop	1882	Pfeffer led the Trojans in RBI in 1882.	
Charlie Reilley	Catcher	1879		
Chief Roseman	Right fielder	1882		
Harry Salisbury	Pitcher	1879		
John Shoupe	Shortstop	1879		
John Smith	First baseman	1882		
Joe Straub	Catcher	1880		
Live Oak Taylor	Left fielder	1879		
Bill Tobin	First baseman	1880		
Mickey Welch^{†}	Pitcher	1880–1882	Welch led the Trojans in wins and strikeouts in 1880 and 1881.	
