= List of Major League Baseball players (Ha) =

The following is a list of Major League Baseball players, retired or active.

== Ha ==
Name	Debut	Final game	Position	Teams	Ref
Yamid Haad	July 5, 1999	October 1, 2005	Catcher	Pittsburgh Pirates, San Francisco Giants	
Bert Haas	September 9, 1937	August 26, 1951	Utility player	Brooklyn Dodgers, Cincinnati Reds, Philadelphia Phillies, New York Giants, Chicago White Sox	
Bruno Haas	June 23, 1915	September 18, 1915	Pitcher	Philadelphia Athletics	
Dave Haas	September 8, 1991	June 13, 1993	Pitcher	Detroit Tigers	
Eddie Haas	September 8, 1957	October 1, 1960	Outfielder	Chicago Cubs, Milwaukee Braves	
Moose Haas	September 8, 1976	June 19, 1987	Pitcher	Milwaukee Brewers, Oakland Athletics	
Mule Haas	August 15, 1925	September 1, 1938	Outfielder	Pittsburgh Pirates, Philadelphia Athletics, Chicago White Sox	
Bob Habenicht	April 17, 1951	May 3, 1953	Pitcher	St. Louis Cardinals, St. Louis Browns	
Emil Haberer	July 9, 1901	September 3, 1909	Catcher	Cincinnati Reds	
John Habyan	September 29, 1985	June 8, 1986	Pitcher	Baltimore Orioles, New York Yankees, Kansas City Royals, St. Louis Cardinals, California Angels, Colorado Rockies	
Irv Hach	July 1, 1897	July 17, 1897	Utility infielder	Louisville Colonels	
Stan Hack	April 12, 1932	September 24, 1937	Third baseman	Chicago Cubs	
Eric Hacker	September 22, 2009		Pitcher	Pittsburgh Pirates, Minnesota Twins	
Rich Hacker	July 2, 1971	September 29, 1971	Shortstop	Montreal Expos	
Warren Hacker	September 24, 1948	September 29, 1961	Pitcher	Chicago Cubs, Cincinnati Redlegs, Philadelphia Phillies, Chicago White Sox	
Jim Hackett	September 14, 1902	September 27, 1903	First baseman	St. Louis Cardinals	
Mert Hackett	May 2, 1883	October 6, 1887	Catcher	Boston Beaneaters, Kansas City Cowboys (NL), Indianapolis Hoosiers (NL)	
Walter Hackett	April 17, 1884	October 8, 1885	Shortstop	Boston Reds (UA), Boston Beaneaters	
Luther Hackman	September 1, 1999	September 27, 2003	Pitcher	Colorado Rockies, St. Louis Cardinals, San Diego Padres	
Harvey Haddix	August 20, 1952	August 28, 1965	Pitcher	St. Louis Cardinals, Philadelphia Phillies, Cincinnati Redlegs, Pittsburgh Pirates, Baltimore Orioles	
George Haddock	September 27, 1888	September 20, 1894	Pitcher	Washington Nationals (1886–1889), Buffalo Bisons (PL), Boston Reds (1890–91), Brooklyn Grooms, Philadelphia Phillies, Washington Senators (NL)	
Bump Hadley	April 20, 1926	September 16, 1941	Pitcher	Washington Senators, Chicago White Sox, St. Louis Browns, New York Yankees, New York Giants, Philadelphia Athletics	
Kent Hadley	September 14, 1958	August 21, 1960	First baseman	Kansas City Athletics, New York Yankees	
Bill Haeffner	June 29, 1915	May 5, 1928	Catcher	Philadelphia Athletics, Pittsburgh Pirates, New York Giants	
Mickey Haefner	April 22, 1943	September 28, 1950	Pitcher	Washington Senators, Chicago White Sox, Boston Braves	
Charlie Haeger	May 10, 2006		Pitcher	Chicago White Sox, San Diego Padres, Los Angeles Dodgers	
Bud Hafey	April 21, 1935	September 15, 1939	Outfielder	Chicago White Sox, Pittsburgh Pirates, Cincinnati Reds, Philadelphia Phillies	
Chick Hafey β	August 28, 1924	September 30, 1937	Outfielder	St. Louis Cardinals, Cincinnati Reds	
Tom Hafey	July 21, 1939	July 30, 1944	Third baseman	New York Giants, St. Louis Browns	
Leo Hafford	April 15, 1906	April 24, 1906	Pitcher	Cincinnati Reds	
Frank Hafner	May 5, 1888	May 16, 1888	Pitcher	Kansas City Cowboys (AA)	
Travis Hafner	August 6, 2002		First baseman	Texas Rangers, Cleveland Indians	
Nick Hagadone	September 1, 2011		Pitcher	Cleveland Indians	
Art Hagan	June 30, 1883	May 13, 1884	Pitcher	Philadelphia Quakers, Buffalo Bisons (NL)	
Casey Hageman	September 18, 1911	October 3, 1914	Pitcher	Boston Red Sox, St. Louis Cardinals, Chicago Cubs	
Kevin Hagen	June 4, 1983	September 29, 1984	Pitcher	St. Louis Cardinals	
Rip Hagerman	April 16, 1909	May 11, 1916	Pitcher	Chicago Cubs, Cleveland Naps/Indians	
Bill Hague	May 4, 1875	August 15, 1879	Third baseman	St. Louis Brown Stockings, Louisville Grays, Providence Grays	
Joe Hague	September 19, 1968	June 2, 1973	First baseman	St. Louis Cardinals, Cincinnati Reds	
Dick Hahn	September 7, 1940	September 7, 1940	Catcher	Washington Senators	
Don Hahn	April 8, 1969	September 25, 1975	Outfielder	Montreal Expos, New York Mets, Philadelphia Phillies, St. Louis Cardinals, San Diego Padres	
Ed Hahn	August 31, 1905	June 5, 1910	Outfielder	New York Yankees, Chicago White Sox	
Fred Hahn	April 19, 1952	April 19, 1952	Pitcher	St. Louis Cardinals	
Noodles Hahn	April 18, 1899	June 7, 1906	Pitcher	Cincinnati Reds, New York Highlanders	
Hal Haid	September 5, 1919	August 25, 1933	Pitcher	St. Louis Browns, St. Louis Cardinals, Boston Braves, Chicago White Sox	
Ed Haigh	August 14, 1892	August 14, 1892	Outfielder	St. Louis Browns (NL)	
Hinkey Haines	April 20, 1923	October 7, 1923	Outfielder	New York Yankees	
Jesse Haines β	July 20, 1918	September 10, 1937	Pitcher	Cincinnati Reds, St. Louis Cardinals	
Jerry Hairston Sr.	July 26, 1973	September 25, 1989	Outfielder	Chicago White Sox, Pittsburgh Pirates	
Jerry Hairston Jr.	September 11, 1998		Utility player	Baltimore Orioles, Chicago Cubs, Texas Rangers, Cincinnati Reds, New York Yankees, San Diego Padres, Washington Nationals, Milwaukee Brewers	
Johnny Hairston	September 6, 1969	October 2, 1969	Utility player	Chicago Cubs	
Sam Hairston	July 21, 1951	August 26, 1951	Catcher	Chicago White Sox	
Scott Hairston	May 7, 2004		Outfielder	Arizona Diamondbacks, San Diego Padres, Oakland Athletics, New York Mets	
Jim Haislip	August 27, 1913	August 27, 1913	Pitcher	Philadelphia Phillies	
Chet Hajduk	April 16, 1941	April 16, 1941	Pinch hitter	Chicago White Sox	
Dave Hajek	September 15, 1995	September 26, 1996	Utility infielder	Houston Astros	
John Halama	April 2, 1998	June 10, 2006	Pitcher	Houston Astros, Seattle Mariners, Oakland Athletics, Tampa Bay Devil Rays, Boston Red Sox, Washington Nationals, Baltimore Orioles	
George Halas	May 6, 1919	July 5, 1919	Outfielder	New York Yankees	
Ed Halbriter	May 23, 1882	May 23, 1882	Pitcher	Philadelphia Athletics (1882–90)	
John Haldeman	July 3, 1877	July 3, 1877	Second baseman	Louisville Grays	
Bob Hale	July 4, 1955	October 1, 1961	First baseman	Baltimore Orioles, Cleveland Indians, New York Yankees	
Chip Hale	August 27, 1989	May 4, 1997	Utility infielder	Minnesota Twins, Los Angeles Dodgers	
Dad Hale	April 21, 1902	August 16, 1902	Pitcher	Boston Beaneaters, Baltimore Orioles	
George Hale	August 24, 1914	June 26, 1918	Catcher	St. Louis Browns	
John Hale	September 8, 1974	August 1, 1979	Outfielder	Los Angeles Dodgers, Seattle Mariners	
Odell Hale	August 1, 1931	September 7, 1941	Utility infielder	Cleveland Indians, Boston Red Sox, New York Giants	
Sammy Hale	April 20, 1920	August 23, 1930	Third baseman	Detroit Tigers, Philadelphia Athletics, St. Louis Browns	
James Haley	June 22, 1880	July 23, 1880	Catcher	Troy Trojans	
Raymond Haley	April 21, 1915	September 15, 1917	Catcher	Boston Red Sox, Philadelphia Athletics	
Ed Halicki	July 8, 1974	October 1, 1980	Pitcher	San Francisco Giants, California Angels	
Al Hall	May 1, 1879	May 13, 1880	Outfielder	Troy Trojans, Cleveland Blues (NL)	
Albert Hall	September 12, 1981	October 1, 1989	Outfielder	Atlanta Braves, Pittsburgh Pirates	
Bert Hall	August 21, 1911	October 9, 1911	Pitcher	Philadelphia Phillies	
Bill Hall (P)	July 4, 1913	July 18, 1913	Pitcher	Brooklyn Superbas	
Bill Hall (C)	April 18, 1954	September 26, 1958	Catcher	Pittsburgh Pirates	
Bill Hall (IF)	September 1, 2002		Utility player	Milwaukee Brewers, Seattle Mariners, Boston Red Sox, Houston Astros, San Francisco Giants	
Bob Hall (IF/OF)	April 18, 1904	October 7, 1905	Utility player	Philadelphia Phillies, New York Giants, Brooklyn Superbas	
Bob Hall (P)	April 23, 1949	September 26, 1953	Pitcher	Boston Braves, Pittsburgh Pirates	
Charley Hall	July 12, 1906	August 7, 1918	Pitcher	Cincinnati Reds, Boston Red Sox, St. Louis Cardinals, Detroit Tigers	
Charlie Hall	May 3, 1887	May 5, 1887	Outfielder	New York Metropolitans	
Darren Hall	April 30, 1994	August 11, 1998	Pitcher	Toronto Blue Jays, Los Angeles Dodgers	
Dick Hall	April 15, 1952	September 25, 1971	Pitcher	Pittsburgh Pirates, Kansas City Athletics, Baltimore Orioles, Philadelphia Phillies	
Drew Hall	September 14, 1986	September 26, 1990	Pitcher	Chicago Cubs, Texas Rangers, Montreal Expos	
George Hall	May 5, 1871	October 6, 1877	Outfielder	Washington Olympics, Baltimore Canaries, Boston Red Stockings, Philadelphia Athletics (1860–76), Louisville Grays	
Herb Hall	April 25, 1918	May 3, 1918	Pitcher	Detroit Tigers	
Irv Hall	April 20, 1943	July 26, 1946	Second baseman	Philadelphia Athletics	
Jim Hall	May 20, 1872	May 21, 1875	Second baseman	Brooklyn Atlantics, Keokuk Westerns	
Jimmie Hall	April 9, 1963	September 13, 1970	Outfielder	Minnesota Twins, California Angels, Cleveland Indians, New York Yankees, Chicago Cubs, Atlanta Braves	
Joe Hall	April 5, 1994	June 18, 1997	Outfielder	Chicago White Sox, Detroit Tigers	
John Hall	April 21, 1948	May 8, 1948	Pitcher	Brooklyn Dodgers	
Josh Hall	August 2, 2003	September 24, 2003	Pitcher	Cincinnati Reds	
Marc Hall	August 20, 1910	July 29, 1914	Pitcher	St. Louis Browns, Detroit Tigers	
Mel Hall	September 3, 1981	May 21, 1996	Outfielder	Chicago Cubs, Cleveland Indians, New York Yankees, San Francisco Giants	
Russ Hall	April 15, 1898	July 16, 1901	Shortstop	St. Louis Browns (NL), Cleveland Blues (AL)	
Toby Hall	September 15, 2000	September 21, 2008	Catcher	Tampa Bay Devil Rays, Los Angeles Dodgers, Chicago White Sox	
Tom Hall	June 9, 1968	May 21, 1977	Pitcher	Minnesota Twins, Cincinnati Reds, New York Mets, Kansas City Royals	
John Halla	August 18, 1905	August 29, 1905	Pitcher	Cleveland Naps	
Roy Halladay	September 20, 1998		Pitcher	Toronto Blue Jays, Philadelphia Phillies	
Bill Hallahan	April 16, 1925	September 14, 1938	Pitcher	St. Louis Cardinals, Cincinnati Reds, Philadelphia Phillies	
Tom Haller	April 11, 1961	October 4, 1972	Catcher	San Francisco Giants, Los Angeles Dodgers, Detroit Tigers	
Jack Hallett	September 13, 1940	April 29, 1948	Pitcher	Chicago White Sox, Pittsburgh Pirates, New York Giants	
Newt Halliday	August 19, 1916	August 19, 1916	First baseman	Pittsburgh Pirates	
Jocko Halligan	May 13, 1890	August 3, 1892	Outfielder	Buffalo Bisons (PL), Cincinnati Reds, Baltimore Orioles (NL)	
Ed Hallinan	May 13, 1911	August 10, 1912	Shortstop	St. Louis Browns	
Jimmy Hallinan	July 26, 1871	August 22, 1878	Shortstop	Fort Wayne Kekiongas, Keokuk Westerns, New York Mutuals, Cincinnati Reds (1876–1880), Chicago White Stockings, Indianapolis Blues	
Bill Hallman (2B)	April 23, 1888	September 27, 1903	Second baseman	Philadelphia Quakers, Philadelphia Athletics (1890–91), Philadelphia Phillies, St. Louis Browns (NL), Brooklyn Bridegrooms, Cleveland Blues (AL)	
Bill Hallman (OF)	April 25, 1901	September 27, 1907	Outfielder	Milwaukee Brewers (1901), Chicago White Sox, Pittsburgh Pirates	
Charlie Hallstrom	September 23, 1885	September 23, 1885	Pitcher	Providence Grays	
Greg Halman	September 23, 2010		Outfielder	Seattle Mariners	
Jim Halpin	June 15, 1882	August 26, 1885	Shortstop	Worcester Worcesters, Washington Nationals (UA), Detroit Wolverines	
Brad Halsey	June 19, 2004	October 1, 2006	Pitcher	New York Yankees, Arizona Diamondbacks, Oakland Athletics	
Al Halt	May 29, 1914	August 30, 1918	Utility infielder	Brooklyn Tip-Tops, Cleveland Indians	
Shane Halter	April 6, 1997	October 3, 2004	Utility infielder	Kansas City Royals, New York Mets, Detroit Tigers, Anaheim Angels	
Ralph Ham	May 6, 1871	September 15, 1871	Outfielder	Rockford Forest Citys	
Doc Hamann	September 21, 1922	September 21, 1922	Pitcher	Cleveland Indians	
Roger Hambright	July 19, 1971	September 25, 1971	Pitcher	New York Yankees	
Charlie Hamburg	April 18, 1890	October 14, 1890	Outfielder	Louisville Colonels	
Mark Hamburger	August 31, 2011		Pitcher	Texas Rangers	
Jim Hamby	September 20, 1926	May 27, 1927	Catcher	New York Giants	
Bob Hamelin	September 12, 1993	September 27, 1998	First baseman	Kansas City Royals, Detroit Tigers, Milwaukee Brewers	
Cole Hamels	May 12, 2006		Pitcher	Philadelphia Phillies, Texas Rangers	
John Hamill	May 1, 1884	July 31, 1884	Pitcher	Washington Nationals (AA)	
Billy Hamilton β	July 31, 1888	September 16, 1901	Outfielder	Kansas City Cowboys (AA), Philadelphia Phillies, Boston Beaneaters	
Darryl Hamilton	June 3, 1988	June 28, 2001	Outfielder	Milwaukee Brewers, Texas Rangers, San Francisco Giants, Colorado Rockies, New York Mets	
Dave Hamilton	May 29, 1972	September 19, 1980	Pitcher	Oakland Athletics, Chicago White Sox, St. Louis Cardinals, Pittsburgh Pirates	
Earl Hamilton	April 14, 1911	May 4, 1924	Pitcher	St. Louis Browns, Detroit Tigers, Pittsburgh Pirates, Philadelphia Phillies	
Jack Hamilton	April 13, 1962	August 10, 1969	Pitcher	Philadelphia Phillies, Detroit Tigers, New York Mets, California Angels, Cleveland Indians, Chicago White Sox	
Jeff Hamilton	June 28, 1986	September 28, 1991	Third baseman	Los Angeles Dodgers	
Joey Hamilton	May 24, 1994	June 6, 2003	Pitcher	San Diego Padres, Toronto Blue Jays, Cincinnati Reds	
Josh Hamilton	April 2, 2007		Outfielder	Cincinnati Reds, Texas Rangers	
Mark Hamilton	September 20, 2010		First baseman	St. Louis Cardinals	
Steve Hamilton	April 23, 1961	August 16, 1972	Pitcher	Cleveland Indians, Washington Senators, New York Yankees, Chicago White Sox, San Francisco Giants, Chicago Cubs	
Tom Hamilton	September 4, 1952	September 13, 1953	First baseman	Philadelphia Athletics	
Ken Hamlin	June 17, 1957	September 26, 1966	Shortstop	Los Angeles Angels, Washington Senators (1961–71)	
Luke Hamlin	September 18, 1933	September 26, 1944	Pitcher	Detroit Tigers, Brooklyn Dodgers, Pittsburgh Pirates, Philadelphia Athletics	
Pete Hamm	July 29, 1970	September 19, 1971	Pitcher	Minnesota Twins	
Atlee Hammaker	August 13, 1981	August 9, 1995	Pitcher	Kansas City Royals, San Francisco Giants, San Diego Padres, Chicago White Sox	
Jason Hammel	April 11, 2006		Pitcher	Tampa Bay Devil Rays/Rays, Colorado Rockies	
Robby Hammock	April 11, 2003		Catcher	Arizona Diamondbacks	
Chris Hammond	July 16, 1990	June 29, 2006	Pitcher	Cincinnati Reds, Florida Marlins, Boston Red Sox, Atlanta Braves, New York Yankees, Oakland Athletics, San Diego Padres	
Jack Hammond	April 15, 1915	June 16, 1922	Second baseman	Cleveland Indians, Pittsburgh Pirates	
Steve Hammond	June 28, 1982	October 3, 1982	Outfielder	Kansas City Royals	
Jeffrey Hammonds	June 25, 1993	May 22, 2005	Outfielder	Baltimore Orioles, Cincinnati Reds, Colorado Rockies, Milwaukee Brewers, San Francisco Giants, Washington Nationals	
Garvin Hamner	April 17, 1945	June 7, 1945	Second baseman	Philadelphia Phillies	
Granny Hamner	September 14, 1944	August 1, 1962	Shortstop	Philadelphia Phillies, Cleveland Indians, Kansas City Athletics	
Ralph Hamner	April 28, 1946	May 18, 1949	Pitcher	Chicago White Sox, Chicago Cubs	
Justin Hampson	September 10, 2006	September 28, 2008	Pitcher	Colorado Rockies, San Diego Padres	
Ike Hampton	September 12, 1974	July 8, 1979	Catcher	New York Mets, California Angels	
Mike Hampton	April 17, 1993	October 3, 2010	Pitcher	Seattle Mariners, Houston Astros, New York Mets, Colorado Rockies, Atlanta Braves, Arizona Diamondbacks	
Erik Hamren	August 1, 2011		Pitcher	San Diego Padres	
Bert Hamric	April 24, 1955	May 26, 1958	Pinch hitter	Brooklyn Dodgers, Baltimore Orioles	
Ray Hamrick	August 14, 1943	July 9, 1944	Shortstop	Philadelphia Phillies	
Tim Hamulack	September 2, 2005	September 16, 2006	Pitcher	New York Mets, Los Angeles Dodgers	
Buddy Hancken	May 14, 1940	May 14, 1940	Catcher	Philadelphia Athletics	
Fred Hancock	April 26, 1949	September 29, 1949	Shortstop	Chicago White Sox	
Garry Hancock	July 16, 1978	September 30, 1984	Outfielder	Boston Red Sox, Oakland Athletics	
Josh Hancock	September 10, 2002	April 28, 2007	Pitcher	Boston Red Sox, Philadelphia Phillies, Cincinnati Reds, St. Louis Cardinals	
Lee Hancock	September 3, 1995	May 13, 1996	Pitcher	Pittsburgh Pirates	
Ryan Hancock	June 8, 1996	July 18, 1996	Pitcher	California Angels	
Brad Hand	June 7, 2011		Pitcher	Florida Marlins	
Rich Hand	April 9, 1970	September 26, 1973	Pitcher	Cleveland Indians, Texas Rangers, California Angels	
Jim Handiboe	May 28, 1886	September 8, 1886	Pitcher	Pittsburgh Alleghenys	
Mike Handiboe	September 8, 1911	September 19, 1911	Outfielder	New York Highlanders	
Gene Handley	April 16, 1946	September 28, 1947	Second baseman	Philadelphia Athletics	
Lee Handley	April 15, 1936	September 28, 1947	Third baseman	Cincinnati Reds, Pittsburgh Pirates, Philadelphia Phillies	
Vern Handrahan	April 14, 1964	September 21, 1966	Pitcher	Kansas City Athletics	
Bill Hands	June 3, 1965	August 10, 1975	Pitcher	San Francisco Giants, Chicago Cubs, Minnesota Twins, Texas Rangers	
Harry Hanebrink	May 3, 1953	September 27, 1959	Utility player	Milwaukee Braves, Philadelphia Phillies	
Chris Haney	June 21, 1991	August 18, 2002	Pitcher	Montreal Expos, Kansas City Royals, Chicago Cubs, Cleveland Indians, Boston Red Sox	
Fred Haney	April 18, 1922	May 7, 1929	Third baseman	Detroit Tigers, Boston Red Sox, Chicago Cubs, St. Louis Cardinals	
Larry Haney	July 27, 1966	October 1, 1978	Catcher	Baltimore Orioles, Seattle Pilots, Oakland Athletics, St. Louis Cardinals, Milwaukee Brewers	
Todd Haney	September 9, 1992	September 26, 1998	Second baseman	Montreal Expos, Chicago Cubs, New York Mets	
Charlie Hanford	April 13, 1914	September 30, 1915	Outfielder	Buffalo Buffeds, Chicago Whales	
Ryan Hanigan	September 9, 2007		Catcher	Cincinnati Reds	
Don Hankins	April 23, 1927	September 3, 1927	Pitcher	Detroit Tigers	
Jay Hankins	April 15, 1961	June 16, 1963	Outfielder	Kansas City Athletics	
Frank Hankinson	May 1, 1878	October 14, 1888	Third baseman	Chicago White Stockings, Cleveland Blues (NL), Troy Trojans, New York Gothams, New York Metropolitans, Kansas City Cowboys (AA)	
Jim Hanley	July 3, 1913	July 3, 1913	Pitcher	New York Yankees	
Bill Hanlon	April 16, 1903	April 26, 1903	First baseman	Chicago Cubs	
Ned Hanlon β	May 1, 1880	September 15, 1892	Outfielder	Cleveland Blues (NL), Detroit Wolverines, Pittsburgh Alleghenys, Pittsburgh Burghers, Pittsburgh Pirates, Baltimore Orioles (NL)	
John Hanna	May 23, 1884	October 15, 1884	Catcher	Washington Nationals (AA), Richmond Virginians	
Preston Hanna	September 13, 1975	October 3, 1982	Pitcher	Atlanta Braves, Oakland Athletics	
Truck Hannah	April 15, 1918	September 29, 1920	Catcher	New York Yankees	
Jack Hannahan	May 25, 2006		Third baseman	Detroit Tigers, Oakland Athletics, Seattle Mariners, Cleveland Indians	
Gerry Hannahs	September 8, 1976	September 27, 1979	Pitcher	Montreal Expos, Los Angeles Dodgers	
Jim Hannan	April 17, 1962	September 10, 1971	Pitcher	Washington Senators (1961–71), Detroit Tigers, Milwaukee Brewers	
Jack Hannifin	April 16, 1906	October 7, 1908	Utility infielder	New York Giants, Boston Doves	
Loy Hanning	September 20, 1939	July 25, 1942	Pitcher	St. Louis Browns	
Pat Hannivan	April 29, 1897	October 2, 1897	Utility player	Brooklyn Bridegrooms	
Joel Hanrahan	July 28, 2007		Pitcher	Washington Nationals, Pittsburgh Pirates	
Devern Hansack	September 23, 2006	September 28, 2008	Pitcher	Boston Red Sox	
Greg Hansell	April 28, 1995	October 3, 1999	Pitcher	Los Angeles Dodgers, Minnesota Twins, Milwaukee Brewers, Pittsburgh Pirates	
Andy Hansen	June 30, 1944	September 13, 1953	Pitcher	New York Giants, Philadelphia Phillies	
Bob Hansen	May 10, 1974	June 10, 1976	First baseman	Milwaukee Brewers	
Craig Hansen	September 19, 2005	April 19, 2009	Pitcher	Boston Red Sox, Pittsburgh Pirates	
Dave Hansen	September 16, 1990	October 2, 2005	Third baseman	Los Angeles Dodgers, Chicago Cubs, San Diego Padres, Seattle Mariners	
Doug Hansen	September 4, 1951	September 11, 1951	Pinch runner	Cleveland Indians	
Jed Hansen	July 29, 1997	September 22, 1999	Second baseman	Kansas City Royals	
Ron Hansen	April 15, 1958	June 20, 1972	Shortstop	Baltimore Orioles, Chicago White Sox, Washington Senators (1961–71), New York Yankees, Kansas City Royals	
Roy Hansen	May 28, 1918	July 4, 1918	Pitcher	Washington Senators	
Snipe Hansen	July 5, 1930	July 13, 1935	Pitcher	Philadelphia Phillies, St. Louis Browns	
Frank Hansford	June 9, 1898	June 9, 1898	Pitcher	Brooklyn Bridegrooms	
Don Hanski	May 6, 1943	May 13, 1944	First baseman	Chicago White Sox	
Erik Hanson	September 5, 1988	June 8, 1998	Pitcher	Seattle Mariners, Cincinnati Reds, Boston Red Sox, Toronto Blue Jays	
Harry Hanson	July 14, 1913	July 14, 1913	Catcher	New York Yankees	
Ollie Hanson	April 27, 1921	May 5, 1921	Pitcher	Chicago Cubs	
Tommy Hanson	June 7, 2009		Pitcher	Atlanta Braves	
Ed Hanyzewski	May 12, 1942	September 26, 1946	Pitcher	Chicago Cubs	
J. A. Happ	June 30, 2007		Pitcher	Philadelphia Phillies, Houston Astros	
John Happenny	July 2, 1923	October 6, 1923	Second baseman	Chicago White Sox	
Aaron Harang	May 25, 2002		Pitcher	Oakland Athletics, Cincinnati Reds, San Diego Padres	
Bill Harbridge	May 15, 1875	October 3, 1884	Utility player	Hartford Dark Blues, Chicago White Stockings, Troy Trojans, Philadelphia Quakers, Cincinnati Outlaw Reds	
Rich Harden	July 21, 2003		Pitcher	Oakland Athletics, Chicago Cubs, Texas Rangers	
Mel Harder	April 24, 1928	September 7, 1947	Pitcher	Cleveland Indians	
Scott Hardesty	August 17, 1899	September 8, 1899	Shortstop	New York Giants	
Pat Hardgrove	June 8, 1918	June 13, 1918	Pinch hitter	Chicago White Sox	
Lou Hardie	May 22, 1884	August 5, 1891	Utility player	Philadelphia Quakers, Chicago White Stockings, Boston Beaneaters, Baltimore Orioles (AA)	
Bud Hardin	April 15, 1952	May 1, 1952	Shortstop	Chicago Cubs	
Jim Hardin	June 23, 1967	October 4, 1972	Pitcher	Baltimore Orioles, New York Yankees, Atlanta Braves	
Charlie Harding	September 18, 1913	September 18, 1913	Pitcher	Detroit Tigers	
Jason Hardtke	September 8, 1996	July 13, 1998	Second baseman	New York Mets, Chicago Cubs	
Alex Hardy	September 4, 1902	May 9, 1903	Pitcher	Chicago Orphans/Cubs	
Carroll Hardy	April 15, 1958	September 27, 1967	Outfielder	Cleveland Indians, Boston Red Sox, Houston Astros, Minnesota Twins	
Harry Hardy	September 26, 1905	September 26, 1906	Pitcher	Washington Senators	
J. J. Hardy	April 4, 2005		Shortstop	Milwaukee Brewers, Minnesota Twins, Baltimore Orioles	
Jack Hardy (C)	August 29, 1903	June 28, 1910	Catcher	Cleveland Naps, Chicago Cubs, Washington Senators	
Jack Hardy (P)	May 23, 1989	June 2, 1989	Pitcher	Chicago White Sox	
Larry Hardy	April 28, 1974	May 16, 1976	Pitcher	San Diego Padres, Houston Astros	
Red Hardy	June 20, 1951	June 23, 1951	Pitcher	New York Giants	
Shawn Hare	September 6, 1991	June 17, 1995	Outfielder	Detroit Tigers, New York Mets, Texas Rangers	
Dan Haren	June 30, 2003		Pitcher	St. Louis Cardinals, Oakland Athletics, Arizona Diamondbacks, Los Angeles Angels of Anaheim	
Steve Hargan	August 3, 1965	September 15, 1977	Pitcher	Cleveland Indians, Texas Rangers, Toronto Blue Jays, Atlanta Braves	
Alan Hargesheimer	July 14, 1980	August 19, 1986	Pitcher	San Francisco Giants, Chicago Cubs, Kansas City Royals	
Gary Hargis	September 29, 1979	September 29, 1979	Pinch runner	Pittsburgh Pirates	
Bubbles Hargrave	September 18, 1913	September 6, 1930	Catcher	Chicago Cubs, Cincinnati Reds, New York Yankees	
Pinky Hargrave	May 18, 1923	September 23, 1933	Catcher	Washington Senators, St. Louis Browns, Detroit Tigers, Boston Braves	
Charlie Hargreaves	June 27, 1923	May 31, 1930	Catcher	Brooklyn Robins, Pittsburgh Pirates	
Mike Hargrove	April 7, 1974	October 6, 1985	First baseman	Texas Rangers, San Diego Padres, Cleveland Indians	
Tim Harikkala	May 27, 1995	August 12, 2007	Pitcher	Seattle Mariners, Boston Red Sox, Colorado Rockies, Oakland Athletics	
Mike Harkey	September 5, 1988	September 28, 1997	Pitcher	Chicago Cubs, Colorado Rockies, Oakland Athletics, California Angels, Los Angeles Dodgers	
John Harkins	May 2, 1884	May 1, 1888	Pitcher	Cleveland Blues (NL), Brooklyn Grays, Baltimore Orioles (AA)	
Spec Harkness	June 3, 1910	July 5, 1911	Pitcher	Cleveland Naps	
Tim Harkness	September 12, 1961	July 28, 1964	First baseman	Los Angeles Dodgers, New York Mets	
Dick Harley (OF)	June 2, 1897	September 21, 1903	Outfielder	St. Louis Browns (NL), Cleveland Spiders, Cincinnati Reds, Detroit Tigers, Chicago cubs	
Dick Harley (P)	April 15, 1905	August 18, 1905	Pitcher	Boston Beaneaters	
Larry Harlow	September 20, 1975	October 3, 1981	Outfielder	Baltimore Orioles, California Angels	
Bill Harman	June 17, 1941	September 18, 1941	Utility player	Philadelphia Phillies	
Brad Harman	April 22, 2008	May 8, 2008	Second baseman	Philadelphia Phillies	
Bob Harmon	June 23, 1909	June 28, 1918	Pitcher	St. Louis Cardinals, Pittsburgh Pirates	
Chuck Harmon	April 17, 1954	September 15, 1957	Utility player	Cincinnati Redlegs, St. Louis Cardinals, Philadelphia Phillies	
Terry Harmon	July 23, 1967	October 2, 1977	Utility infielders	Philadelphia Phillies	
Pete Harnisch	September 13, 1988	May 7, 2001	Pitcher	Baltimore Orioles, Houston Astros, New York Mets, Milwaukee Brewers, Cincinnati Reds	
Bill Harper	June 10, 1911	June 20, 1911	Pitcher	St. Louis Browns	
Brandon Harper	August 9, 2006	October 1, 2006	Catcher	Washington Nationals	
Brian Harper	September 29, 1979	April 29, 1995	Catcher	California Angels, Pittsburgh Pirates, St. Louis Cardinals, Detroit Tigers, Oakland Athletics, Minnesota Twins, Milwaukee Brewers	
George Harper (P)	July 11, 1894	September 1, 1896	Pitcher	Philadelphia Phillies, Brooklyn Bridegrooms	
George Harper (OF)	April 15, 1916	September 28, 1929	Outfielder	Detroit Tigers, Cincinnati Reds, Philadelphia Phillies, San Francisco Giants, St. Louis Cardinals, Boston Braves	
Harry Harper	June 27, 1913	May 8, 1923	Pitcher	Washington Senators, Boston Red Sox, New York Yankees, Brooklyn Robins	
Jack Harper (1900s P)	September 18, 1899	June 6, 1906	Pitcher	Cleveland Spiders, St. Louis Cardinals, St. Louis Browns, Cincinnati Reds, Chicago Cubs	
Jack Harper (1915 P)	April 17, 1915	April 26, 1915	Pitcher	Philadelphia Athletics	
Terry Harper	September 12, 1980	October 2, 1987	Outfielder	Atlanta Braves, Detroit Tigers, Pittsburgh Pirates	
Tommy Harper	April 9, 1962	September 29, 1976	Outfielder	Cincinnati Reds, Cleveland Indians, Seattle Pilots/Milwaukee Brewers, Boston Red Sox, California Angels, Oakland Athletics, Baltimore Orioles	
Travis Harper	August 4, 2000	August 1, 2006	Pitcher	Tampa Bay Devil Rays	
Toby Harrah	September 5, 1969	October 4, 1986	Utility infielder	Washington Senators (1961–71)/Texas Rangers, Cleveland Indians, New York Yankees	
Billy Harrell	September 2, 1955	September 20, 1961	Utility infielder	Cleveland Indians, Boston Red Sox	
John Harrell	October 1, 1969	October 2, 1969	Catcher	San Francisco Giants	
Lucas Harrell	July 30, 2010		Pitcher	Chicago White Sox, Houston Astros	
Ray Harrell	April 16, 1935	July 22, 1945	Pitcher	St. Louis Cardinals, Chicago Cubs, Philadelphia Phillies, Pittsburgh Pirates, New York Giants	
Slim Harrell	June 21, 1912	June 21, 1912	Pitcher	Philadelphia Athletics	
Bill Harrelson	July 31, 1968	September 18, 1968	Pitcher	California Angels	
Bud Harrelson	September 2, 1965	October 5, 1980	Shortstop	New York Mets, Philadelphia Phillies, Texas Rangers	
Ken Harrelson	June 9, 1963	June 20, 1971	Utility player	Kansas City Athletics, Washington Senators (1961–71), Boston Red Sox, Cleveland Indians	
Denny Harriger	June 16, 1998	June 28, 1998	Pitcher	Detroit Tigers	
Andy Harrington (P)	September 8, 1913	September 8, 1913	Pitcher	Cincinnati Reds	
Andy Harrington (PH)	April 18, 1925	April 18, 1925	Pinch hitter	Detroit Tigers	
Bill Harrington	April 16, 1953	September 30, 1956	Pitcher	Philadelphia/Kansas City Athletics	
Jerry Harrington	April 30, 1890	June 19, 1893	Catcher	Cincinnati Reds, Louisville Colonels	
Joe Harrington	September 10, 1895	July 20, 1896	Third baseman	Boston Beaneaters	
Mickey Harrington	July 10, 1963	July 10, 1963	Pinch runner	Philadelphia Phillies	
Ben Harris	April 19, 1914	May 3, 1914	Pitcher	Kansas City Packers	
Bill Harris (1930s P)	April 22, 1923	October 2, 1938	Pitcher	Cincinnati Reds, Pittsburgh Pirates, Boston Red Sox	
Bill Harris (1950s P)	September 27, 1957	September 26, 1959	Pitcher	Brooklyn/Los Angeles Dodgers	
Billy Harris	June 16, 1968	September 26, 1969	Second baseman	Cleveland Indians, Kansas City Royals	
Bob Harris	September 19, 1938	September 16, 1942	Pitcher	Detroit Tigers, St. Louis Browns, Philadelphia Athletics	
Brendan Harris	July 6, 2004		Utility infielder	Chicago Cubs, Montreal Expos/Washington Nationals, Cincinnati Reds, Tampa Bay Devil Rays, Minnesota Twins	
Bubba Harris	April 29, 1948	May 7, 1951	Pitcher	Philadelphia Athletics, Cleveland Indians	
Bucky Harris β	August 28, 1919	June 12, 1931	Second baseman	Washington Senators, Detroit Tigers	
Buddy Harris	September 10, 1970	September 3, 1971	Pitcher	Houston Astros	
Candy Harris	April 13, 1967	April 27, 1967	Pinch runner	Houston Astros	
Charlie Harris	May 26, 1899	October 14, 1899	Third baseman	Baltimore Orioles (NL)	
Dave Harris	April 14, 1925	September 15, 1934	Outfielder	Boston Braves, Chicago White Sox, Washington Senators	
Donald Harris	September 4, 1991	October 2, 1993	Outfielder	Texas Rangers	
Frank Harris	April 17, 1884	May 31, 1884	First baseman	Altoona Mountain City	
Gail Harris	June 3, 1955	May 3, 1960	First baseman	New York Giants, Detroit Tigers	
Gene Harris	April 5, 1989	June 24, 1995	Pitcher	Montreal Expos, Seattle Mariners, San Diego Padres, Detroit Tigers, Philadelphia Phillies, Baltimore Orioles	
Greg Harris (1981–95 P)	May 20, 1981	September 29, 1995	Pitcher	New York Mets, Cincinnati Reds, Montreal Expos, San Diego Padres, Texas Rangers, Philadelphia Phillies, Boston Red Sox, New York Yankees	
Greg Harris (1988–95 P)	September 19, 1988	August 2, 1995	Pitcher	San Diego Padres, Colorado Rockies, Minnesota Twins	
Herb Harris	July 21, 1936	August 2, 1936	Pitcher	Philadelphia Phillies	
Jeff Harris	August 2, 2005	April 11, 2006	Pitcher	Seattle Mariners	
Joe Harris (P)	September 22, 1905	October 5, 1907	Pitcher	Boston Americans	
Joe Harris (1B)	June 9, 1914	September 25, 1928	First baseman	New York Yankees, Cleveland Indians, Boston Red Sox, Washington Senators, Pittsburgh Pirates, Brooklyn Robins	
John Harris	September 26, 1979	October 3, 1981	First baseman	California Angels	
Lenny Harris	September 7, 1988	October 2, 2005	Utility player	Cincinnati Reds, Los Angeles Dodgers, New York Mets, Colorado Rockies, Arizona Diamondbacks, Milwaukee Brewers, Chicago Cubs, Florida Marlins	
Lum Harris	April 19, 1941	May 11, 1947	Pitcher	Philadelphia Athletics, Washington Senators	
Mickey Harris	April 23, 1940	September 3, 1952	Pitcher	Boston Red Sox, Washington Senators, Cleveland Indians	
Ned Harris	April 20, 1941	April 28, 1946	Outfielder	Detroit Tigers	
Pep Harris	August 14, 1996	September 27, 1998	Pitcher	California Angels	
Reggie Harris	July 4, 1990	August 15, 1999	Pitcher	Oakland Athletics, Boston Red Sox, Philadelphia Phillies, Houston Astros, Milwaukee Brewers	
Spence Harris	April 14, 1925	June 14, 1930	Outfielder	Chicago White Sox, Washington Senators, Philadelphia Athletics	
Vic Harris	July 21, 1972	October 5, 1980	Utility player	Texas Rangers, Chicago Cubs, St. Louis Cardinals, San Francisco Giants, Milwaukee Brewers	
Willie Harris	September 2, 2001		Outfielder	Baltimore Orioles, Chicago White Sox, Boston Red Sox, Atlanta Braves, Washington Nationals, New York Mets	
Harrison, first name unknown	September 27, 1901	September 27, 1901	Outfielder	Washington Senators	
Bob Harrison	September 23, 1955	September 25, 1956	Pitcher	Baltimore Orioles	
Chuck Harrison	September 15, 1965	September 25, 1971	First baseman	Houston Astros, Kansas City Royals	
Josh Harrison	May 31, 2011		Third baseman	Pittsburgh Pirates	
Matt Harrison	July 8, 2008		Pitcher	Texas Rangers	
Rit Harrison	May 20, 1875	May 20, 1875	Utility player	New Haven Elm Citys	
Roric Harrison	April 18, 1972	July 23, 1978	Pitcher	Baltimore Orioles, Atlanta Braves, Cleveland Indians, Minnesota Twins	
Tom Harrison	May 7, 1965	May 17, 1965	Pitcher	Kansas City Athletics	
Slim Harriss	April 19, 1920	September 29, 1928	Pitcher	Philadelphia Athletics, Boston Red Sox	
Earl Harrist	August 18, 1945	June 18, 1953	Pitcher	Cincinnati Reds, Chicago White Sox, Washington Senators, St. Louis Browns, Detroit Tigers	
Sam Harshany	September 28, 1937	May 3, 1940	Catcher	St. Louis Browns	
Jack Harshman	September 16, 1948	October 1, 1960	Pitcher	New York Giants, Chicago White Sox, Baltimore Orioles, Boston Red Sox, Cleveland Indians	
Oscar Harstad	April 23, 1915	August 28, 1915	Pitcher	Cleveland Indians	
Bill Hart (P)	July 26, 1886	July 30, 1901	Pitcher	Philadelphia Athletics (1882–90), Brooklyn Grooms, Pittsburgh Pirates, St. Louis Browns (NL), Cleveland Blues (AL)	
Bill Hart (IF)	September 18, 1943	August 5, 1945	Utility infielder	Brooklyn Dodgers	
Billy Hart	July 13, 1890	October 14, 1890	Pitcher	St. Louis Browns (AA)	
Bo Hart	June 19, 2003	April 29, 2004	Second baseman	St. Louis Cardinals	
Corey Hart	May 25, 2004		Outfielder	Milwaukee Brewers	
Hub Hart	July 16, 1905	October 5, 1907	Catcher	Chicago White Sox	
Jason Hart	August 18, 2002	September 29, 2002	Outfielder	Texas Rangers	
Jim Ray Hart	July 7, 1963	May 27, 1974	Third baseman	San Francisco Giants, New York Yankees	
Jimmy Hart	June 6, 1901	August 24, 1901	First baseman	Baltimore Orioles (1901–02)	
Kevin Hart	September 4, 2007		Pitcher	Chicago Cubs, Pittsburgh Pirates	
Mike Hart (1980 OF)	June 12, 1980	June 22, 1980	Outfielder	Texas Rangers	
Mike Hart (1984–87 OF)	May 8, 1984	October 4, 1987	Outfielder	Minnesota Twins, Baltimore Orioles	
Tom Hart	April 15, 1981	May 7, 1981	Catcher	Washington Statesmen	
Chuck Hartenstein	September 11, 1965	July 26, 1977	Pitcher	Chicago Cubs, Pittsburgh Pirates, St. Louis Cardinals, Boston Red Sox, Toronto Blue Jays	
Frank Harter	August 31, 1912	June 9, 1914	Pitcher	Cincinnati Reds, Indianapolis Hoosiers (FL)	
Bruce Hartford	June 3, 1914	June 27, 1914	Shortstop	Cleveland Naps	
Dean Hartgraves	May 3, 1995	July 23, 1998	Pitcher	Houston Astros, Atlanta Braves, San Francisco Giants	
Jumbo Harting	October 5, 1886	October 5, 1886	Catcher	St. Louis Browns (AA)	
Chris Hartje	September 9, 1939	September 23, 1939	Catcher	Brooklyn Dodgers	
Chick Hartley	June 4, 1902	June 4, 1902	Outfielder	New York Giants	
Grover Hartley	May 13, 1911	September 30, 1934	Catcher	New York Giants, St. Louis Terriers, St. Louis Browns, Boston Red Sox, Cleveland Indians	
Mike Hartley	September 10, 1989	September 24, 1995	Pitcher	Los Angeles Dodgers, Philadelphia Phillies, Minnesota Twins, Boston Red Sox, Baltimore Orioles	
Bob Hartman	April 26, 1959	July 18, 1962	Pitcher	Milwaukee Braves, Cleveland Indians	
Charlie Hartman	June 24, 1908	June 24, 1908	Pitcher	Boston Red Sox	
Fred Hartman	July 26, 1894	September 8, 1902	Third baseman	Pittsburgh Pirates, St. Louis Cardinals, New York Giants, Chicago White Sox	
J. C. Hartman	July 21, 1962	July 1, 1963	Shortstop	Houston Colt .45s	
Gabby Hartnett β	April 12, 1922	September 24, 1941	Catcher	Chicago Cubs, New York Giants	
Pat Hartnett	April 18, 1890	May 15, 1890	First baseman	St. Louis Browns (AA)	
Ray Hartranft	June 16, 1913	June 16, 1913	Pitcher	Philadelphia Phillies	
Greg Harts	September 15, 1973	September 20, 1973	Pinch hitter	New York Mets	
Topsy Hartsel	September 14, 1898	September 30, 1911	Outfielder	Louisville Colonels, Cincinnati Reds, Chicago Orphans, Philadelphia Athletics	
Roy Hartsfield	April 28, 1950	June 14, 1952	Second baseman	Boston Braves	
Jeff Hartsock	September 12, 1992	September 28, 1992	Pitcher	Chicago Cubs	
Clint Hartung	April 15, 1947	September 28, 1952	Pitcher	New York Giants	
Paul Hartzell	April 10, 1976	September 24, 1984	Pitcher	California Angels, Minnesota Twins, Baltimore Orioles, Milwaukee Brewers	
Roy Hartzell	April 17, 1906	July 25, 1916	Utility player	St. Louis Browns, New York Highlanders/Yankees	
Luther Harvel	July 31, 1928	September 25, 1928	Outfielder	Cleveland Indians	
Bryan Harvey	May 16, 1987	April 28, 1995	Pitcher	California Angels, Florida Marlins	
Ken Harvey	September 18, 2001	May 18, 2005	First baseman	Kansas City Royals	
Zaza Harvey	May 3, 1900	May 4, 1902	Outfielder	Chicago Orphans, Chicago White Sox, Cleveland Blues (AL)/Bronchos	
Chad Harville	June 23, 1999	August 12, 2006	Pitcher	Oakland Athletics, Houston Astros, Boston Red Sox, Tampa Bay Devil Rays	
Ziggy Hasbrook	September 6, 1916	September 27, 1917	First baseman	Chicago White Sox	
Shigetoshi Hasegawa	April 5, 1997	September 28, 2005	Pitcher	Anaheim Angels, Seattle Mariners	
Bill Haselman	September 3, 1990	September 27, 2003	Catcher	Texas Rangers, Seattle Mariners, Boston Red Sox, Detroit Tigers	
Don Hasenmayer	May 2, 1945	September 29, 1946	Utility infielder	Philadelphia Phillies	
Herb Hash	April 19, 1940	April 30, 1941	Pitcher	Boston Red Sox	
Mickey Haslin	September 7, 1933	October 2, 1938	Utility infielder	Philadelphia Phillies, Boston Bees, New York Giants	
Pete Hasney	September 13, 1890	September 13, 1890	Outfielder	Philadelphia Athletics (1882–90)	
Bill Hassamaer	April 19, 1894	July 6, 1896	Outfielder	Washington Senators (NL), Louisville Colonels	
Buddy Hassett	April 14, 1936	September 27, 1942	First baseman	Brooklyn Dodgers, Boston Bees/Braves, New York Yankees	
Ron Hassey	April 23, 1978	September 3, 1991	Catcher	Cleveland Indians, Chicago Cubs, New York Yankees, Chicago White Sox, Oakland Athletics, Montreal Expos	
Andy Hassler	May 30, 1971	May 7, 1985	Pitcher	California Angels, Kansas City Royals, Boston Red Sox, New York Mets, Pittsburgh Pirates, St. Louis Cardinals	
Joe Hassler	May 26, 1928	September 16, 1930	Shortstop	Philadelphia Athletics, St. Louis Browns	
Gene Hasson	September 9, 1937	May 11, 1938	First baseman	Philadelphia Athletics	
Charlie Hastings	May 3, 1893	September 3, 1898	Pitcher	Cleveland Spiders, Pittsburgh Pirates	
Scott Hastings	May 6, 1871	September 1, 1877	Utility player	Rockford Forest Citys, Cleveland Forest Citys, Baltimore Canaries, Hartford Dark Blues, Chicago White Stockings, Louisville Grays, Cincinnati Reds (1876–1880)	
Bob Hasty	September 11, 1919	September 26, 1924	Pitcher	Philadelphia Athletics	
Billy Hatcher	September 10, 1984	May 9, 1995	Outfielder	Chicago Cubs, Houston Astros, Pittsburgh Pirates, Cincinnati Reds, Boston Red Sox, Philadelphia Phillies, Texas Rangers	
Chris Hatcher (OF)	September 6, 1998	September 26, 1998	Outfielder	Kansas City Royals	
Chris Hatcher (P)	September 19, 2010		Pitcher	Florida Marlins	
Mickey Hatcher	August 3, 1979	October 3, 1990	Outfielder	Los Angeles Dodgers, Minnesota Twins	
Fred Hatfield	August 31, 1950	May 13, 1958	Third baseman	Boston Red Sox, Detroit Tigers, Chicago White Sox, Cleveland Indians, Cincinnati Redlegs	
Gil Hatfield	September 24, 1885	May 8, 1895	Utility infielder	Buffalo Bisons (NL), New York Giants, New York Giants (PL), Washington Statesmen, Brooklyn Grooms, Louisville Colonels	
John Hatfield	May 18, 1871	May 5, 1876	Utility player	New York Mutuals	
Hilly Hathaway	September 8, 1992	September 11, 1993	Pitcher	California Angels	
Ray Hathaway	April 20, 1945	June 3, 1945	Pitcher	Brooklyn Dodgers	
Scott Hatteberg	September 8, 1995	May 25, 2008	First baseman	Boston Red Sox, Oakland Athletics, Cincinnati Reds	
Joe Hatten	April 21, 1946	July 4, 1952	Pitcher	Brooklyn Dodgers, Chicago Cubs	
Clyde Hatter	April 23, 1935	May 10, 1937	Pitcher	Detroit Tigers	
John Hattig	August 19, 2006	October 1, 2006	Third baseman	Toronto Blue Jays	
Grady Hatton	April 16, 1946	October 1, 1960	Third baseman	Cincinnati Reds/Redlegs, Chicago White Sox, Boston Red Sox, St. Louis Cardinals, Baltimore Orioles, Chicago Cubs	
Art Hauger	July 17, 1912	August 28, 1912	Outfielder	Cleveland Naps	
Chris Haughey	October 3, 1943	October 3, 1943	Pitcher	Brooklyn Dodgers	
Gary Haught	July 16, 1997	August 2, 1997	Pitcher	Oakland Athletics	
Phil Haugstad	September 1, 1947	July 1, 1952	Pitcher	Brooklyn Dodgers, Cincinnati Reds	
Arnold Hauser	April 21, 1910	September 29, 1915	Shortstop	St. Louis Cardinals, Chicago Whales	
Joe Hauser	April 18, 1922	October 6, 1929	First baseman	Philadelphia Athletics, Cleveland Indians	
Tom Hausman	April 26, 1975	September 30, 1982	Pitcher	Milwaukee Brewers, New York Mets, Atlanta Braves	
Clem Hausmann	April 28, 1944	April 27, 1949	Pitcher	Boston Red Sox, Philadelphia Athletics	
George Hausmann	April 18, 1944	August 11, 1949	Second baseman	New York Giants	
Charlie Hautz	May 4, 1875	September 4, 1884	First baseman	St. Louis Red Stockings, Pittsburgh Alleghenys	
Brad Havens	June 5, 1981	July 23, 1989	Pitcher	Minnesota Twins, Baltimore Orioles, Los Angeles Dodgers, Cleveland Indians, Detroit Tigers	
Ryan Hawblitzel	June 9, 1996	August 5, 1996	Pitcher	Colorado Rockies	
Bill Hawes	May 1, 1879	October 15, 1884	Outfielder	Boston Beaneaters, Cincinnati Outlaw Reds	
Roy Hawes	September 23, 1951	September 30, 1951	First baseman	Washington Senators	
Ed Hawk	September 7, 1911	October 7, 1911	Pitcher	St. Louis Browns	
Bill Hawke	July 28, 1892	September 30, 1894	Pitcher	St. Louis Browns (NL), Baltimore Orioles (NL)	
Thorny Hawkes	May 1, 1879	August 2, 1884	Second baseman	Troy Trojans, Washington Nationals (AA)	
Andy Hawkins	July 17, 1982	August 4, 1991	Pitcher	San Diego Padres, New York Yankees, Oakland Athletics	
LaTroy Hawkins	April 29, 1995		Pitcher	Minnesota Twins, Chicago Cubs, San Francisco Giants, Baltimore Orioles, Colorado Rockies, New York Yankees, Houston Astros, Milwaukee Brewers	
Wynn Hawkins	April 22, 1960	June 9, 1962	Pitcher	Cleveland Indians	
Chicken Hawks	April 14, 1921	September 27, 1925	First baseman	New York Yankees, Philadelphia Phillies	
Blake Hawksworth	June 6, 2009		Pitcher	St. Louis Cardinals, Los Angeles Dodgers	
Marvin Hawley	September 22, 1894	September 22, 1894	Pitcher	Boston Beaneaters	
Pink Hawley	August 13, 1892	August 20, 1901	Pitcher	Pittsburgh Pirates, Cincinnati Reds, New York Giants, Milwaukee Brewers (1901)	
Howie Haworth	August 14, 1915	August 28, 1915	Catcher	Cleveland Indians	
Brad Hawpe	May 1, 2004		Outfielder	Colorado Rockies, Tampa Bay Rays, San Diego Padres	
Hal Haydel	September 7, 1970	September 28, 1971	Pitcher	Minnesota Twins	
Jack Hayden	April 26, 1901	September 26, 1908	Outfielder	Philadelphia Athletics, Boston Americans, Chicago Cubs	
Lefty Hayden	June 28, 1956	July 6, 1958	Pitcher	Cincinnati Redlegs	
Ben Hayes	June 25, 1982	October 2, 1983	Pitcher	Cincinnati Reds	
Bill Hayes	September 30, 1980	September 3, 1981	Catcher	Chicago Cubs	
Brett Hayes	May 22, 2009		Catcher	Florida Marlins	
Charlie Hayes	September 11, 1988	June 27, 2001	Third baseman	San Francisco Giants, Philadelphia Phillies, New York Yankees, Colorado Rockies, Pittsburgh Pirates, Milwaukee Brewers, Houston Astros	
Frankie Hayes	September 21, 1933	May 17, 1947	Catcher	Philadelphia Athletics, St. Louis Browns, Cleveland Indians, Chicago White Sox, Boston Red Sox	
Jackie Hayes (C)	May 2, 1882	August 23, 1890	Catcher	Worcester Worcesters, Pittsburgh Alleghenys, Brooklyn Atlantics/Grays, Washington Nationals (1886–1889), Baltimore Orioles (AA), Brooklyn Ward's Wonders	
Jackie Hayes (2B)	August 5, 1927	August 29, 1940	Second baseman	Washington Senators, Chicago White Sox	
Jim Hayes	July 13, 1935	August 10, 1935	Pitcher	Washington Senators	
John Hayes	September 9, 1876	September 16, 1876	Outfielder	New York Mutuals	
Von Hayes	April 14, 1981	August 19, 1992	Outfielder	Cleveland Indians, Philadelphia Phillies, California Angels	
Dirk Hayhurst	August 23, 2008		Pitcher	San Diego Padres, Toronto Blue Jay	
Fred Hayner	August 19, 1890	August 19, 1890	Pitcher	Pittsburgh Pirates	
Heath Haynes	June 1, 1994	June 8, 1994	Pitcher	Montreal Expos	
Jimmy Haynes	September 13, 1995	May 4, 2004	Pitcher	Baltimore Orioles, Oakland Athletics, Milwaukee Brewers, Cincinnati Reds	
Joe Haynes	April 24, 1939	August 30, 1952	Pitcher	Washington Senators, Chicago White Sox	
Nathan Haynes	May 28, 2007	May 9, 2008	Outfielder	Los Angeles Angels of Anaheim, Tampa Bay Rays	
Ray Hayward	September 20, 1986	July 5, 1988	Pitcher	San Diego Padres, Texas Rangers	
Bill Haywood	July 28, 1968	September 11, 1968	Pitcher	Washington Senators (1961–71)	
Ray Hayworth	June 27, 1926	June 18, 1945	Catcher	Detroit Tigers, Brooklyn Dodgers, New York Giants, St. Louis Browns	
Red Hayworth	April 21, 1944	September 22, 1945	Catcher	St. Louis Browns	
Drungo Hazewood	September 19, 1980	October 4, 1980	Outfielder	Baltimore Orioles	
Bob Hazle	September 8, 1955	September 28, 1958	Outfielder	Cincinnati Reds, Milwaukee Braves, Detroit Tigers	
Doc Hazleton	April 17, 1902	April 26, 1902	First baseman	St. Louis Cardinals	
