= Pat McManus =

Irish baseball player (1859–1917)

- Pitcher
- Born: October 1859; Ireland
- Died: May 19, 1917 (aged 57); Mount Hope, New York, U.S.
- Batted: Unknown Threw: Unknown

MLB debut
- May 22, 1879, for the Troy Trojans

Last MLB appearance
- August 13, 1879, for the Troy Trojans

MLB statistics
- Win–loss record: 0–2
- Earned run average: 3.00
- Complete games: 2
- Stats at Baseball Reference

Teams
- Troy Trojans (1879)

Patrick A. McManus (October, 1859 – May 19, 1917) was an Irish born Major League Baseball pitcher during part of the 1879 season. He was a native of Ireland.

McManus started and completed two games for the Troy Trojans of the National League. He gave up just 25 baserunners (24 hits and 1 walk) in 21 innings. He also gave up 21 runs, but only 7 of them were earned runs.

His first game was on May 22, 1879, against the Cleveland Blues at Kennard Street Park in Cleveland, Ohio. The Trojans lost, 10–8. His second and last game was August 13, 1879, against the Providence Grays at Putnam Grounds in Troy, New York. The Trojans lost, 11–3.

One of his teammates on the 1879 Trojans was Hall of Famer Dan Brouthers.

In McManus's short MLB career, he was 0–2 with 6 strikeouts, 1 walk, and an ERA of 3.00.

He died at the age of 57 in Mount Hope, New York.
