= List of Major League Baseball players (H) =

The following is a list of Major League Baseball players, retired or active. As of the end of the 2011 season, there have been 1,295 players with a last name that begins with H who have been on a major league roster at some point.

== H ==
For reasons of space, this list has been split into three pages:

- Yamid Haad through Jason Hazleton (Ha)
- Ed Head through Lloyd Hittle (He–Hi)
- Myril Hoag through Adam Hyzdu (Ho–Hz)
