= List of Major League Baseball career wins leaders =

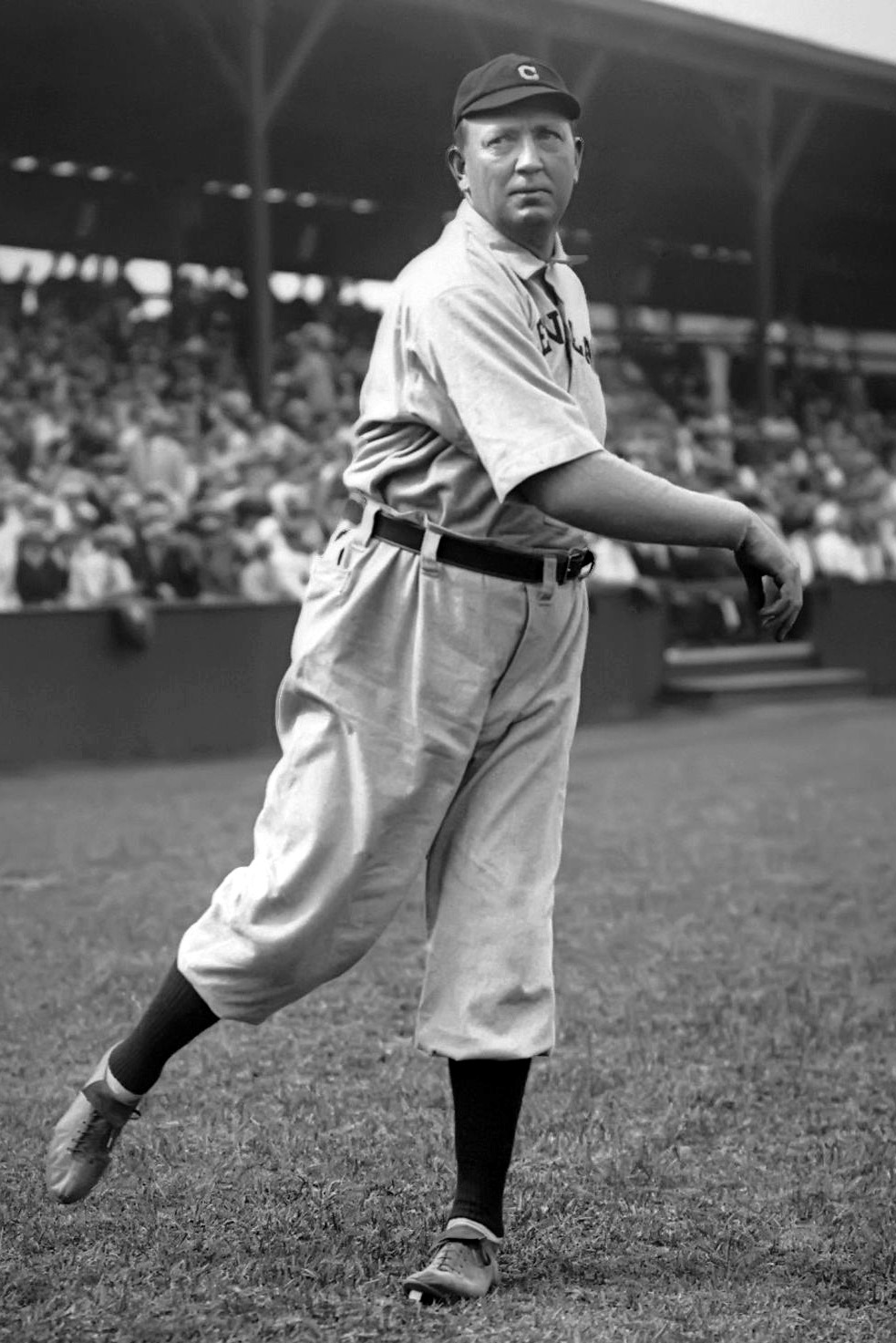
Cy Young, the all-time leader in career wins

This is a list of Major League Baseball (MLB) pitchers with 200 or more career wins. In the sport of baseball, a win is a statistic credited to the pitcher for the winning team who was in the game when his team last took the lead. A starting pitcher must complete five innings to earn a win; if this does not happen, the official scorer awards the win based on guidelines set forth in the official rules. Cy Young holds the MLB win record with 511; Walter Johnson is second with 417. Young and Johnson are the only players to earn 400 or more wins. Among pitchers whose entire careers were in the post-1920 live-ball era, Warren Spahn has the most wins with 363. Only 24 pitchers have accumulated 300 or more wins in their careers. Roger Clemens is the only pitcher with 300 wins or more not elected to the National Baseball Hall of Fame. MLB officially only keeps statistics from the National League and the American League. This table includes statistics from other major leagues as well, which are defunct now, including the American Association (AA), the National Association of Base Ball Players, and the National Association of Professional Baseball Players.

== Key ==
**Rank**	Rank amongst leaders in career wins. A blank field indicates a tie.
**Player (2026 Ws)**	Player name, along with the number of wins accumulated during the 2026 Major League Baseball season.
**W**	Total career wins.
*	Denotes elected to National Baseball Hall of Fame.
**Bold**	Denotes active player. (Note: A player is considered inactive if he has announced his retirement or has not played for a full season.)

== List ==
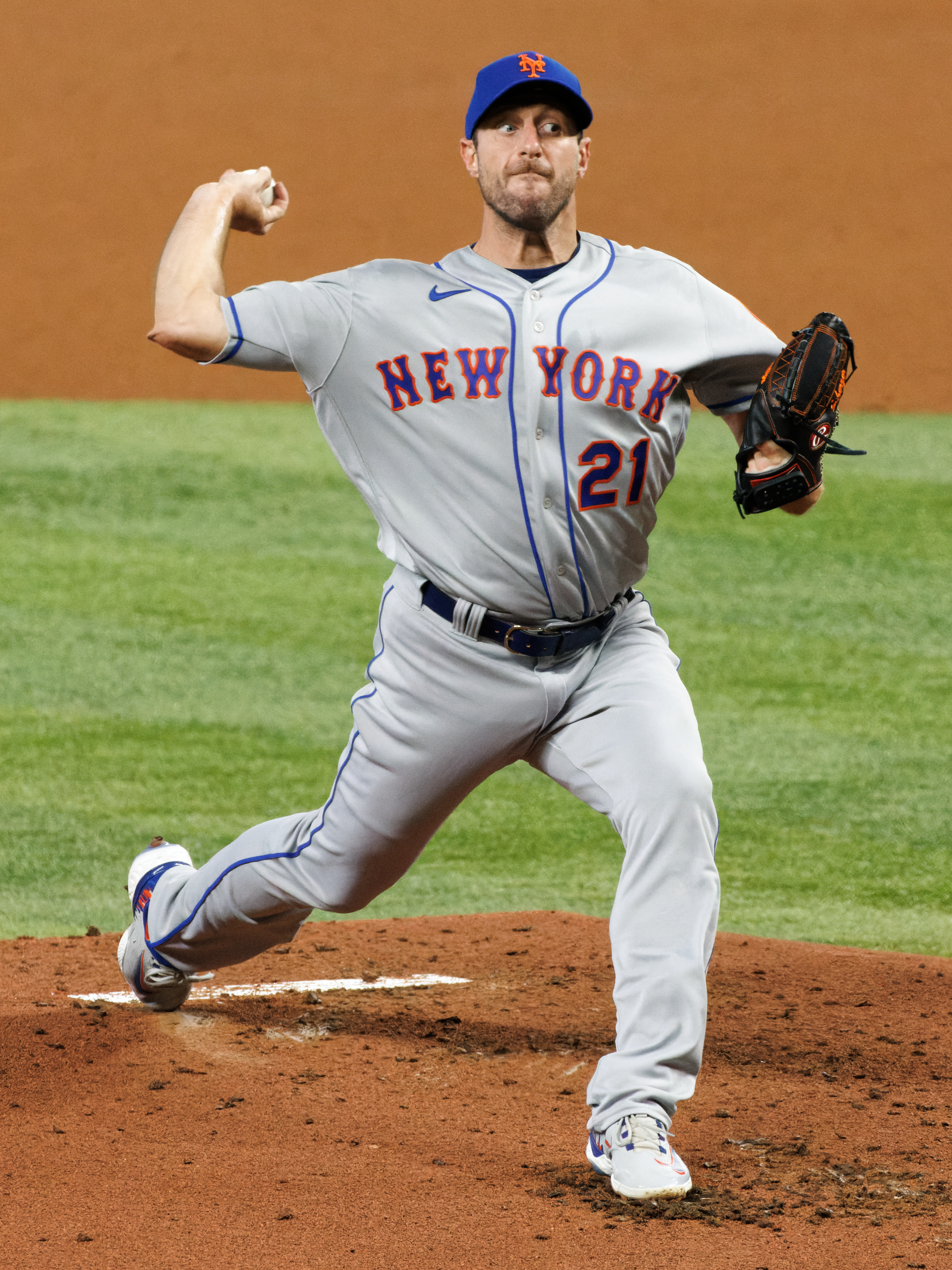
Max Scherzer, the active leader, is tied for 71st all-time in career wins with 225.

- Stats updated as of September 27, 2026.

Rank	Player (2026 Ws)	W
1	Cy Young*	511
2	Walter Johnson*	417
3	Grover Cleveland Alexander*	373
	Christy Mathewson*	373
5	Pud Galvin*	365
6	Warren Spahn*	363
7	Kid Nichols*	361
8	Greg Maddux*	355
9	Roger Clemens	354
10	Tim Keefe*	342
11	Steve Carlton*	329
12	John Clarkson*	328
13	Eddie Plank*	326
14	Nolan Ryan*	324
	Don Sutton*	324
16	Phil Niekro*	318
17	Gaylord Perry*	314
18	Tom Seaver*	311
19	Charles Radbourn*	309
20	Mickey Welch*	307
21	Tom Glavine*	305
22	Randy Johnson*	303
23	Lefty Grove*	300
	Early Wynn*	300
25	Bobby Mathews	297
26	Tommy John	288
27	Bert Blyleven*	287
28	Robin Roberts*	286
29	Ferguson Jenkins*	284
	Tony Mullane	284
31	Jim Kaat*	283
32	Red Ruffing*	273
33	Burleigh Grimes*	270
	Mike Mussina*	270
35	Jamie Moyer	269
36	Jim Palmer*	268
37	Bob Feller*	266
	Eppa Rixey*	266
	Justin Verlander	266
40	Jim McCormick	265
41	Gus Weyhing	264
42	Ted Lyons*	260
43	Andy Pettitte	256
44	Red Faber*	254
	Jack Morris*	254
46	Carl Hubbell*	253
47	Albert Spalding*	252
48	Bob Gibson*	251
	CC Sabathia*	251
50	Vic Willis*	249
51	Bartolo Colón	247
	Jack Quinn	247
53	Joe McGinnity*	246
	Amos Rusie*	246
55	Dennis Martínez	245
	Jack Powell	245
57	Juan Marichal*	243
58	Herb Pennock*	241
59	Frank Tanana	240
60	Mordecai Brown*	239
	David Wells	239

Rank	Player (2026 Ws)	W
62	Clark Griffith*	237
	Waite Hoyt*	237
64	Whitey Ford*	236
65	Tommy Bond	234
66	Charlie Buffinton	233
67	Sad Sam Jones	229
	Luis Tiant	229
	Will White	229
70	George Mullin	228
71	Zack Greinke	225
	**Max Scherzer (4)**	225
73	Jim Bunning*	224
	Catfish Hunter*	224
75	Hooks Dauss	223
	Paul Derringer	223
	Mel Harder	223
	Clayton Kershaw	223
79	Tim Hudson	222
	Jerry Koosman	222
81	Joe Niekro	221
82	Jerry Reuss	220
83	Pedro Martínez*	219
	Kenny Rogers	219
85	Bob Caruthers	218
	Earl Whitehill	218
87	Freddie Fitzsimmons	217
	Mickey Lolich	217
89	Wilbur Cooper	216
	Charlie Hough	216
	Curt Schilling	216
92	Stan Coveleski*	215
	Jim Perry	215
94	Mark Buehrle	214
	Rick Reuschel	214
96	John Smoltz*	213
97	Chief Bender*	212
98	Kevin Brown	211
	Bobo Newsom	211
	Billy Pierce	211
	Bob Welch	211
102	Jesse Haines*	210
103	Vida Blue	209
	Eddie Cicotte	209
	Don Drysdale*	209
	Milt Pappas	209
107	Bob Lemon*	207
	Carl Mays	207
	Hal Newhouser*	207
110	Orel Hershiser	204
	Al Orth	204
112	Lew Burdette	203
	Roy Halladay*	203
	Silver King	203
	Jack Stivetts	203
116	Charlie Root	201
	Rube Marquard*	201
118	Chuck Finley	200
	Jon Lester	200
	George Uhle	200
	Adam Wainwright	200
	Tim Wakefield	200

== See also ==
- Baseball statistics
- List of Major League Baseball annual wins leaders
- List of Major League Baseball career games started leaders
- List of Major League Baseball career games finished leaders
- 300 win club
