= Jack McDonald (baseball) =

American baseball player (1844–1880)

- Outfielder
- Born: c. 1844; Brooklyn, New York, U.S.
- Died: November 23, 1880 (aged 35–36); Brooklyn, New York, U.S.
- Batted: Unknown Threw: Unknown

MLB statistics
- Batting average: .242
- Runs scored: 9
- RBIs: 4
- Stats at Baseball Reference

Teams
- Brooklyn Atlantics (1872); Brooklyn Eckfords (1872)

Daniel "Jack" McDonald (c. 1844 – November 23, 1880) was an American professional baseball player who played outfield for the 1872 Brooklyn Atlantics and Brooklyn Eckfords teams of the NAPBBP.
