= William Ahearn =

American baseball player (1858–1919)

- Catcher
- Born: 1858; Troy, New York, U.S.
- Died: April 28, 1919 (aged 60–61); Troy, New York, U.S.
- Batted: Unknown Threw: Unknown

MLB debut
- June 19, 1880, for the Troy Trojans

Last MLB appearance
- June 19, 1880, for the Troy Trojans

MLB statistics
- Batting average: .250
- Home runs: 0
- Runs batted in: 0
- Stats at Baseball Reference

Teams
- Troy Trojans (1880)

William H. Ahearn (1858 – April 28, 1919) was an American Major League Baseball catcher, at least for one day, during the 1880 season. He was born in Troy, New York.

Ahearn played in one game for the Troy Trojans of the National League on June 19, 1880. Behind the plate, he had two putouts, five assists, and two errors for a fielding percentage of .778. He also had seven passed balls. At the plate, he went 1-for-4 for a .250 batting average, and he scored one run. The Trojans lost the game to the Cleveland Blues 18-6. It was played at Haymakers' Grounds in Troy, New York. Ahearn died in Troy on April 28, 1919.
