= Complete game =

Pitcher pitching an entire game without the benefit of a relief pitcher

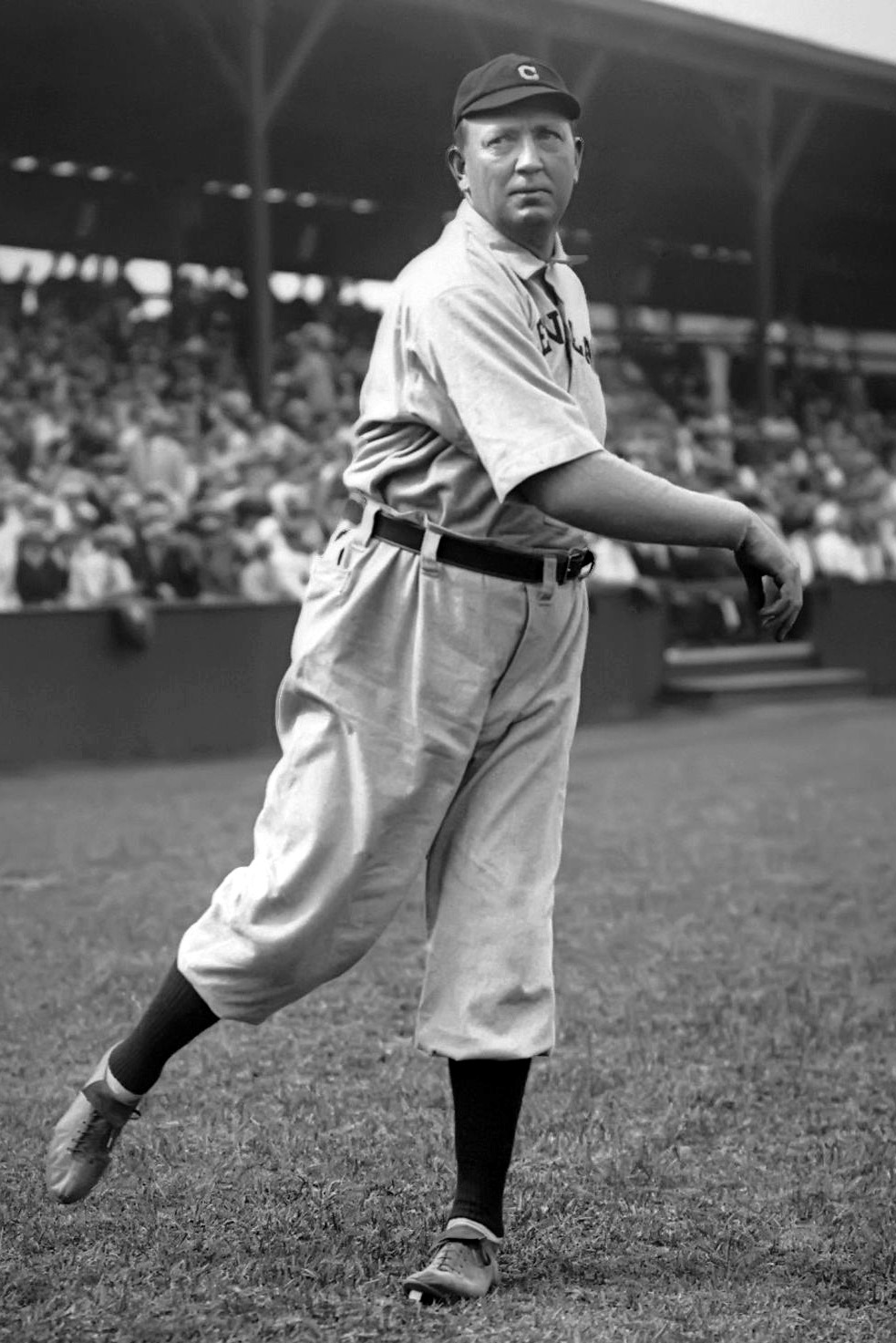
Cy Young, the all-time MLB complete-game leader

In baseball, a complete game (CG) is the act of a pitcher pitching an entire game without the benefit of a relief pitcher. A pitcher who meets this criterion will be credited with a complete game regardless of the number of innings played—pitchers who throw an entire official game that is shortened by rain will still be credited with a complete game, while starting pitchers who are relieved in extra innings after throwing nine or more innings will not be credited with a complete game. A starting pitcher who is replaced by a pinch hitter in the final half inning of a game will still be credited with a complete game.

Complete games have become increasingly rare over the course of baseball history. In the early 20th century, pitchers completed almost all of the games they started, and they were generally expected to do so. In modern baseball, the feat is much more rare. Since 1975, no pitcher has thrown 30 or more complete games in a season; in the 21st century, only twice has any pitcher thrown 10 or more complete games in a season.

== Historical trend ==
Historical MLB complete game trend
| Year | Games started | Complete games | Complete game % | Ref |
|---|---|---|---|---|
| 1904 | 2,496 | 2,186 | 87.6 | |
| 1914 | 3,758 | 2,067 | 55.0 | |
| 1924 | 2,462 | 1,198 | 48.7 | |
| 1934 | 2,446 | 1,061 | 43.4 | |
| 1944 | 2,484 | 1,123 | 45.2 | |
| 1954 | 2,472 | 840 | 34.0 | |
| 1964 | 3,252 | 797 | 24.5 | |
| 1974 | 3,890 | 1,089 | 28.0 | |
| 1984 | 4,210 | 632 | 15.0 | |
| 1994 | 3,200 | 255 | 8.0 | |
| 2004 | 4,854 | 150 | 3.1 | |
| 2014 | 4,860 | 118 | 2.4 | |
| 2024 | 4,858 | 28 | 0.6 | |

In the early 20th century, it was common for most good Major League Baseball (MLB) pitchers to pitch a complete game almost every start, barring injury or ejection. Pitchers were expected to complete games they started. Over the course of the 20th and 21st centuries, complete games became less common, to the point where a modern pitcher may pitch an entire season without throwing a complete game. (In the 2024 MLB season, 0.6% of starts were complete games.) To put this in perspective, as recently as the 1980s, 10–15 complete games a year by a star pitcher was not unheard of, and in 1980, Oakland Athletics pitcher Rick Langford threw 22 consecutive complete games. Years earlier, Robin Roberts of the Philadelphia Phillies threw 28 consecutive complete games, spanning the 1952 and 1953 seasons. In 1962, a news article detailed Bo Belinsky's concern when he failed to complete six starts in a row.

This change has been brought about by strict adherence to pitch counts as a basis for removing a pitcher, even though he may appear to be pitching well, and new pitching philosophies in general. Many have come to believe that the risk of arm injuries becomes far more prevalent after a pitcher has thrown 100 to 120 pitches in a single game. Though Hall-of-Famer Nolan Ryan once threw well over 200 pitches in a single game (a 1974 contest in which he pitched 13 innings), it is now rare for a manager to allow a pitcher to throw more than 120 pitches in a start. Former pitcher Carl Erskine noted the increase in ex-pitchers on coaching staffs since the 1950s, whom he considered better evaluators of a pitchers' ability to pitch late into games. Given this, sabermetricians generally regard Cy Young's total of 749 complete games as the career baseball record that will never be broken. Further supporting the belief is that only three pitchers (Young, Ryan, and Don Sutton) even made at least 749 starts in their careers.

James Shields threw 11 complete games in the 2011 season for the Tampa Bay Rays, becoming the first pitcher to reach double digits in a single season since CC Sabathia threw 10 complete games for the Cleveland Indians and Milwaukee Brewers in 2008. The last pitcher to throw as many as 15 complete games in a single season was Curt Schilling, who accomplished that feat for the Philadelphia Phillies in 1998. The last pitcher to throw 20 complete games in a single season was Fernando Valenzuela, who did so for the Los Angeles Dodgers in 1986. The last pitcher to throw 25 complete games in a season was Rick Langford, who had 28 for the Oakland Athletics in 1980. The last pitcher to throw 30 complete games in a season was Catfish Hunter, who did so for the New York Yankees in 1975.

== Career leaders ==
1. Cy Young – 749
2. Pud Galvin – 646
3. Tim Keefe – 554
4. Walter Johnson – 531
5. Kid Nichols – 531
6. Bobby Mathews – 525
7. Mickey Welch – 525
8. Charley Radbourn – 489
9. John Clarkson – 485
10. Tony Mullane – 468
11. Jim McCormick – 466
12. Gus Weyhing – 448
13. Grover Cleveland Alexander – 437
14. Christy Mathewson – 434
15. Jack Powell – 422
16. Eddie Plank – 410
17. Will White – 394
18. Amos Rusie – 392
19. Vic Willis – 388
20. Tommy Bond – 386

All pitchers above are right-handed, except for Eddie Plank. All also played most or all of their careers before the start of the modern live-ball era of baseball, which began during the 1920 season and was fully established in 1921. Among pitchers whose entire careers were in the live-ball era, the all-time leader in complete games is Warren Spahn, whose total of 382 places him 21st all-time.

== Active career leaders ==
Through the 2025 season, the top 10 active players who lead MLB in career complete games were:

| Rank | Name | Complete games |
|---|---|---|
| 1 | Justin Verlander | 26 |
| 2 | Clayton Kershaw | 25 |
| 3 | Johnny Cueto | 18 |
| 4 | Chris Sale | 16 |
| 5 | Sandy Alcantara | 12 |
| 5 | Dallas Keuchel | 12 |
| 5 | Max Scherzer | 12 |
| 8 | Carlos Carrasco | 11 |
| 9 | Framber Valdez | 9 |
| 10 | Gerrit Cole | 8 |

== Single-season leaders ==
1. Will White – 75 (1879)
2. Charley Radbourn – 73 (1884)
3. (tie) Pud Galvin – 72 (1883)
3. (tie) Guy Hecker – 72 (1884)
3. (tie) Jim McCormick – 72 (1880)
6. Pud Galvin – 71 (1884)
7. (tie) John Clarkson –68 (1885)
7. (tie) John Clarkson – 68 (1889)
7. (tie) Tim Keefe – 68 (1883)
10. Bill Hutchison – 67 (1892)
11. (tie) Jim Devlin – 66 (1876)
11. (tie) Matt Kilroy – 66 (1886)
11. (tie) Matt Kilroy –66 (1887)
11. (tie) Charley Radbourn – 66 (1883)
11. (tie) Toad Ramsey – 66 (1886)
16. (tie) Pud Galvin – 65 (1879)
16. (tie) Bill Hutchison – 65 (1890)
16. (tie) Jim McCormick –65 (1882)
19. Silver King – 64 (1888)
19. (tie) Tony Mullane – 64 (1884)
19. (tie) Mickey Welch – 64 (1880)
19. (tie) Will White – 64 - (1883)

All pitchers were right-handed except Matt Kilroy and Toad Ramsey. The record for complete games in a live-ball season is 36, set by Bob Feller in 1946.

== Other records ==
- Jack Taylor completed 187 consecutive games he started between 1901 and 1906.
- Leon Cadore and Joe Oeschger share the record for the longest complete game, achieved when they pitched against each other in a 26-inning marathon that ended in a 1–1 tie on May 1, 1920.
- Allan Travers allowed 26 hits and 24 runs in a 1912 complete game, both still records.

== See also ==
- List of Major League Baseball records considered unbreakable
