= Mickey Welch =

American baseball player (1859–1941)

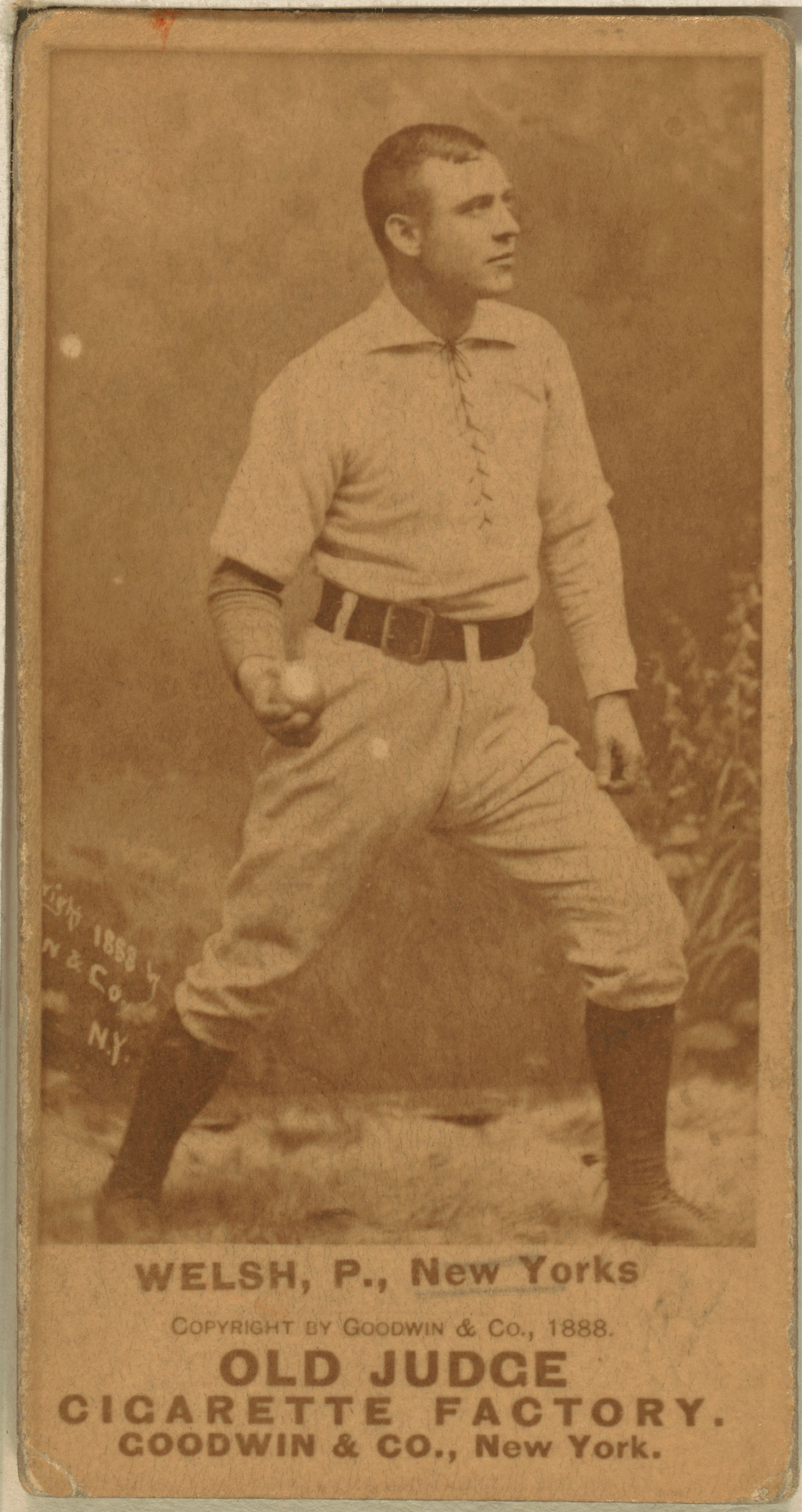
- Welch in 1887
- Pitcher
- Born: July 4, 1859; Brooklyn, New York, U.S.
- Died: July 30, 1941 (aged 82); Concord, New Hampshire, U.S.
- Batted: Right Threw: Right

MLB debut
- May 1, 1880, for the Troy Trojans

Last MLB appearance
- May 17, 1892, for the New York Giants

MLB statistics
- Win–loss record: 307–210
- Earned run average: 2.71
- Strikeouts: 1,850
- Stats at Baseball Reference

Teams
- Troy Trojans (1880–1882); New York Giants (1883–1892)

Member of the National

Baseball Hall of Fame
- Induction: 1973
- Vote: Veterans Committee

Michael Francis Welch (July 4, 1859 – July 30, 1941), nicknamed "Smiling Mickey", was an American professional baseball pitcher. He stood 5 feet 8 inches (1.73 m) tall and weighed 160 pounds (73 kg). He was the third pitcher to accumulate 300 career victories. Welch was born in Brooklyn, New York, and played 13 seasons in the major leagues, three with the Troy Trojans, and 10 with the New York Gothams/Giants. He was very successful with an effective curveball, a change of pace, and a version of the screwball. During his 13 major league seasons, he posted 20 or more wins nine times, seven in succession.

== Early life ==
Welch was born Michael Francis Walsh in the 18th Ward of Brooklyn, New York, to Irish immigrant parents John and Mary Walsh. He later adopted the last name Welch, perhaps spurred by a sportswriter's mistaken recording of his name in a box score, and to distinguish himself from the many men in Brooklyn at the time named Michael Walsh. Off the baseball field, Welch used his birth name throughout his life. Welch's nickname of "Smiling Mickey" derived from his cheerful disposition.

When he was growing up in the Williamsburg section of Brooklyn, baseball was the popular sport among Irish children. Welch recalled that he had to learn different baseball skills because of his small size. He depended on strong control of his pitches, a good curveball and change-of-pace, and a studious approach to opposing batters.

== Major league career ==
=== Early career ===
Welch's earliest professional baseball engagement was in Poughkeepsie, New York, as an outfielder-pitcher for the Volunteers baseball club in 1877, and in the following year he would briefly play for a club in Auburn before joining the Holyoke Shamrocks of the National Association. During the 1879 season with the Shamrocks, his pitching would be credited to their 23–14 record, during which he was supported by the likes of later MLB players Roger Connor, Larry Corcoran, Jerry Dorgan, Peter Gillespie, and Fergy Malone. In 1880, Welch made his major league debut in 1880. His first game was not very successful, as Troy was defeated 13–1 by the Worcester Ruby Legs. However, he won 34 games for the Troy Trojans, teaming up with Tim Keefe to give Troy a devastating two-man starting rotation. On July 6, 1880, he pitched a one-hitter against the Cleveland Blues. Welch's totals dipped during the following two seasons, when Keefe, who also went on to win more than 300 games, began getting a greater share of the starts. The duo would only enjoy moderate success over the course of three seasons with the Trojans, a team that never finished higher than fourth in the National League during its four-season run.

After the Trojans disbanded after the 1882 season, the New York Gothams replaced them, taking many of the Troy players, including Welch. He resumed a heavy workload in 1883, throwing 426 innings in 54 games. This time he split pitching duties with John Montgomery Ward in what turned out to be Ward's final season as a regular pitcher. In 1884, he went 39–21 with 345 strikeouts (a franchise record) and a 2.50 ERA.

=== Strikeout record ===
Welch holds the record for most consecutive batters struck out to begin a game, with nine, set on August 28, 1884. (Note: Russo lists the date as August 26.) The record was not recognized for many years because of confusion over a dropped third strike. In the third inning of that game, a third strike was dropped by New York catcher Bill Loughran. As a result, that batter safely reached first base. Though modern scorekeeping credits a pitcher with a strikeout in this situation, such an event was not always recorded as a strikeout by sportswriters of that era. Baseball historian Harry Simmons helped Welch to receive official recognition of the feat in the 1940s.

Only three pitchers in the National League and two in the American League have come close to matching Mickey Welch's record nine strikeouts. In the National League, Germán Márquez of the Colorado Rockies on September 26, 2018, Jacob deGrom of the New York Mets in 2014, and Jim Deshaies of the Houston Astros in 1986 struck out the first eight batters they faced. In the American League, Carlos Rodón of the Chicago White Sox in 2016 and Joe Cowley of the Chicago White Sox in 1986 struck out the first seven batters they faced. Tom Seaver struck out 10 consecutive batters in 1970, though not at the beginning of the game.

=== Middle career ===
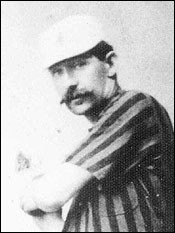
Tim Keefe, Welch's longtime teammate

In 1885, he went 44–11 with 258 strikeouts and a 1.66 ERA. In the 1885 season, Welch and Keefe reunited as a two-man pitching rotation, with Keefe having a 32–13 win–loss record. The team, now called the Giants, had an incredible record of 85–27, with Welch winning 17 consecutive games at one point, but finished second to the Chicago White Stockings, who finished with a record of 87–25.

Welch had negotiated a clause in his contract, beginning in 1884, that prevented the team from pitching him more than every other day. After the 1885 season, Welch was one of nine Giants players to form baseball's first union, which was known as the Brotherhood of Professional Base Ball Players. The players were upset about the way they had been treated by baseball owners. The reserve clause, which restricted player movement and tempered increases in player salaries, had been instituted in 1880. The union spent the next several years recruiting new members and talking about the cause of player salaries. Though Welch was still an active player, he began saving money with the goal of opening a hotel.

In 1886, Welch won 33 games, which was second on the Giants to Keefe's 44 victories. Despite this win total from Welch and Keefe, the team fell to third place in the league. Though they enjoyed a 47–12 record at the Polo Grounds, they were 28–32 while on the road that year. As Keefe and Welch were so overworked by 1887, the Giants picked up young pitchers Bill George and Ledell Titcomb, but both of them struggled and the Giants finished fourth.

=== Later career ===
Some credit Welch with becoming the first pinch hitter in major league history when he batted for Hank O'Day and struck out on September 10, 1889. However, a rule allowing pinch hitters in non-injury situations was not instituted until 1892. The first pinch-hitter under that rule is generally agreed to be Jack Doyle‚ on June 7‚ 1892.

The Giants won the 1889 World Series, but morale was low on the club. Relationships had become strained between players and owners across the league. The league was planning to implement a system of player ratings which would be used to determine player salaries. Welch and the other members of the Brotherhood were outraged by such a system and they began to plan a new baseball league, inviting players to join even if they were not Brotherhood members. The new eight-team league became known as the Players' League.

Before the Players' League began its season in 1890, Welch realized that he was coming to the end of his playing career. Saying that he was in baseball to earn money, Welch agreed to re-sign with the Giants on a three-year contract. Welch said that he had been willing to accept $2,000 less to play in the Players' League, but that deal fell through when the league could only guarantee one year of salary. He met with sharp criticism from Jim O'Rourke and other Brotherhood members, but the Players' League lasted only one season.

On April 24, 1890, with the score tied at 2 in the 7th inning between his Giants and the Boston Beaneaters‚ Welch got into an argument with umpire McDermott, an argument that resulted in the umpire declaring the game forfeited to host Boston. With Welch and Keefe still on the same club, the 1891 New York Giants had two 300-game winners. Until the 1980s, this was the only time that a major league team featured two pitchers with 300 wins each.

After one start in the 1892 season, Welch was sent to the minor leagues, earning a 16–14 record and a 0.87 ERA for the Eastern League's Troy Trojans. He retired from baseball after the season, having compiled 307 victories, 210 losses, 1850 strikeouts and a career 2.71 ERA. As of 2015, Welch ranks third on the all-time list of career wild pitches. He had unique hitting skills for a pitcher, finishing his career with a .224 batting average, 93 doubles, 16 triples and 12 home runs. In addition to his 607 games pitched, Welch made 59 career appearances as an outfielder.

Welch attributed his durability to his ability to get hitters out with slower pitches. His main offerings to hitters were a curveball and a screwball.

== Personal life ==
Author David Fleitz writes that Welch did not swear, smoke or drink hard liquor. Welch liked beer enough that he would write poems about it, reciting them for sportswriters or for fans on the carriage ride to the ballpark on game days. Sometimes his poetry also advertised local bars and restaurants. He did not drink nearly as much as many of his contemporary ballplayers. Giants bat boy Fred Engle speculated that this was because Welch had seen too many ballplayers fall prey to alcoholism.

Welch and his wife Mary had nine children, two of whom died in infancy. Mary died in 1936. During his career, Welch, along with most of his Giants teammates, lived at New York's Broadway Central Hotel.

== After baseball ==
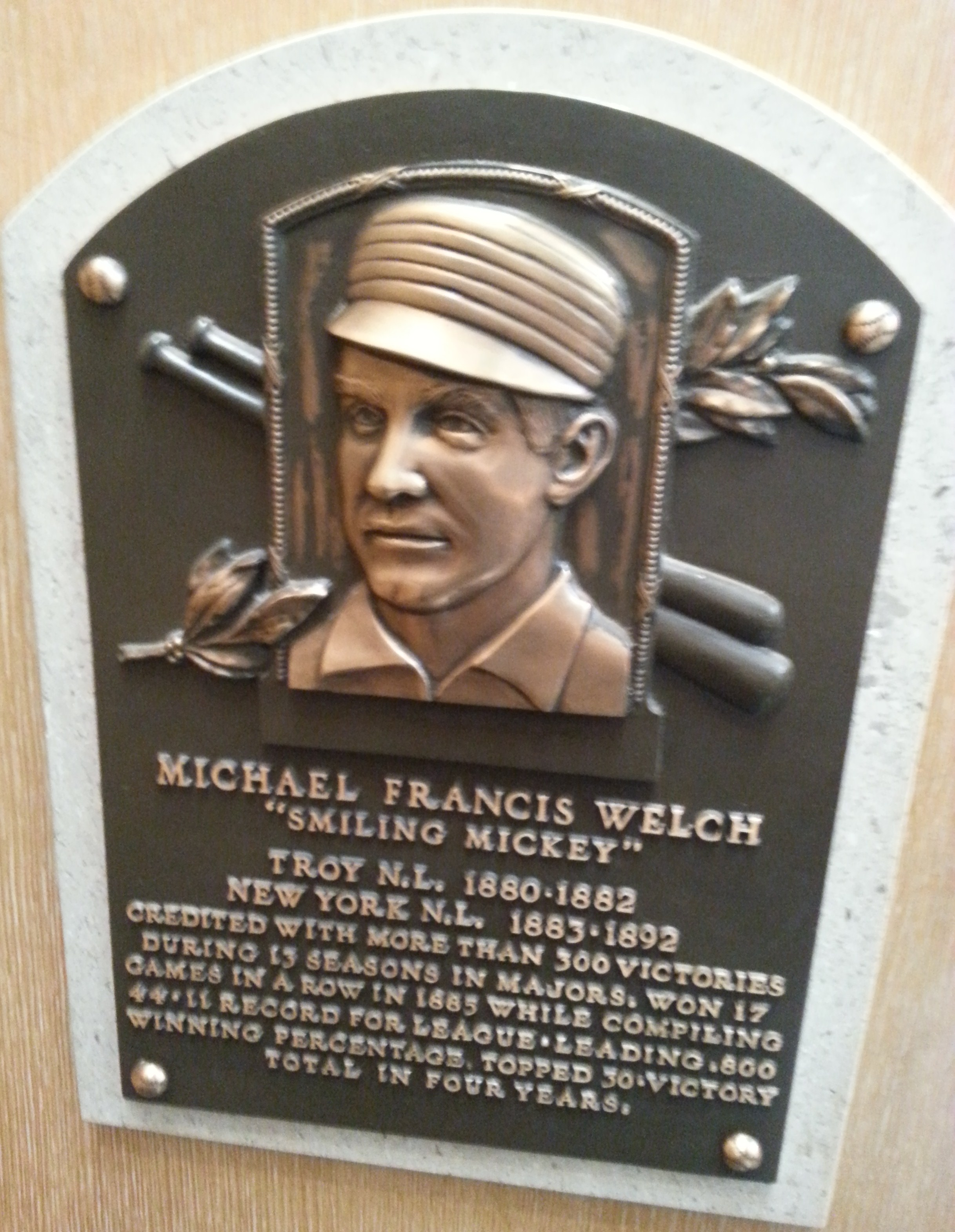
Welch's plaque at the National Baseball Hall of Fame and Museum

After retiring as a player, Welch lived in Holyoke, Massachusetts. He joined an Elks lodge and remained in the organization for more than 50 years. He owned a saloon for a while and after he sold it, he went into the dairy business with one of his sons. Welch spent summers in New York. He worked as an attendant at the Polo Grounds. In a 1911 book on baseball history, Welch was described as the owner of a hotel in Troy, New York. In 1912, he returned to New York, serving as an usher at the Polo Grounds and captivating fans with tales of his playing days.

Welch and Keefe remained friends long after they retired from baseball. In July 1941, Welch had been staying with his grandson in Nashua when he had to be taken to a Concord hospital with complications of gangrene of the foot. He died there on July 30 at the age of 82 and was interred in Section 4, Range 17, Plot 2, Grave 6 of the Calvary Cemetery in Woodside, Queens, New York, under his birth name of Walsh.

Welch was elected to the Baseball Hall of Fame by the Veterans Committee in 1973. He was represented at the Hall of Fame induction ceremony by his elderly daughter, Julia Weiss.

== See also ==
- 300 win club
- List of Major League Baseball career wins leaders
- List of Major League Baseball annual saves leaders
- List of Major League Baseball career strikeout leaders

== Bibliography ==
- Fleitz, David L. (February 27, 2009). The Irish in Baseball: An Early History. McFarland. ISBN 978-0-7864-5304-7.
- Russo, Frank (2014). The Cooperstown Chronicles: Baseball's Colorful Characters, Unusual Lives, and Strange Demises. New York: Rowman & Littlefield. ISBN 978-1-4422-3639-4.
