= Patrick Gillespie (baseball) =

American baseball player (1851–1910)

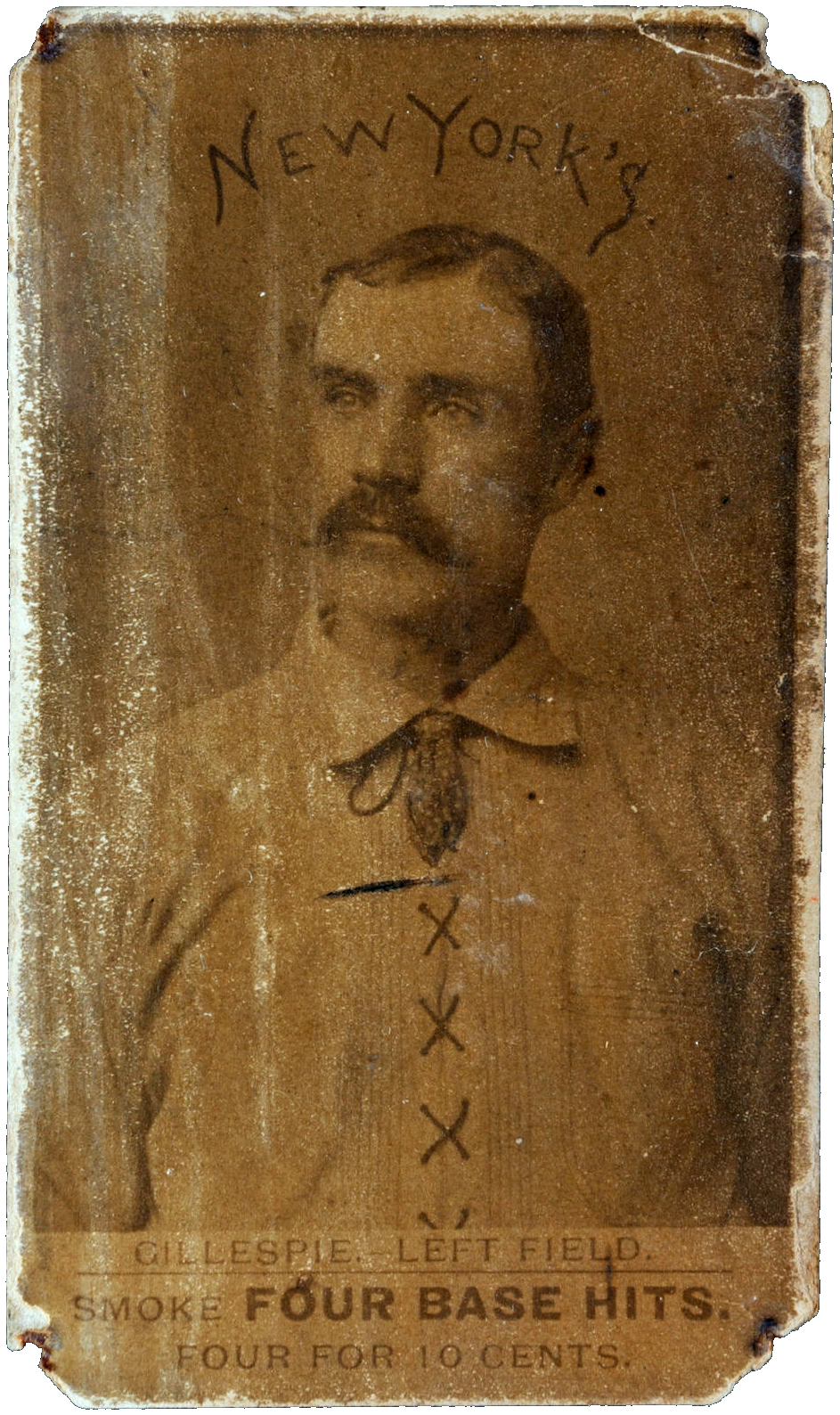
- Left fielder
- Born: November 30, 1851; Carbondale, Pennsylvania, U.S.
- Died: May 4, 1910 (aged 58); Carbondale, Pennsylvania, U.S.
- Batted: Left Threw: Right

MLB debut
- May 1, 1880, for the Troy Trojans

Last MLB appearance
- October 6, 1887, for the New York Giants

MLB statistics
- Batting average: .276
- Hits: 809
- Runs batted in: 351
- Stats at Baseball Reference

Teams
- Troy Trojans (1880–1882); New York Gothams/Giants (1883–1887)

Peter Patrick Gillespie (November 30, 1851 – May 4, 1910) was an American left fielder in Major League Baseball from 1880 to 1887. Gillespie played for the Troy Trojans and New York Giants.

In 714 games over eight seasons, Gillespie posted a .276 batting average (809-for-2927) with 450 runs, 10 home runs and 351 RBI.
