= Tim Keefe =

American baseball player (1857–1933)

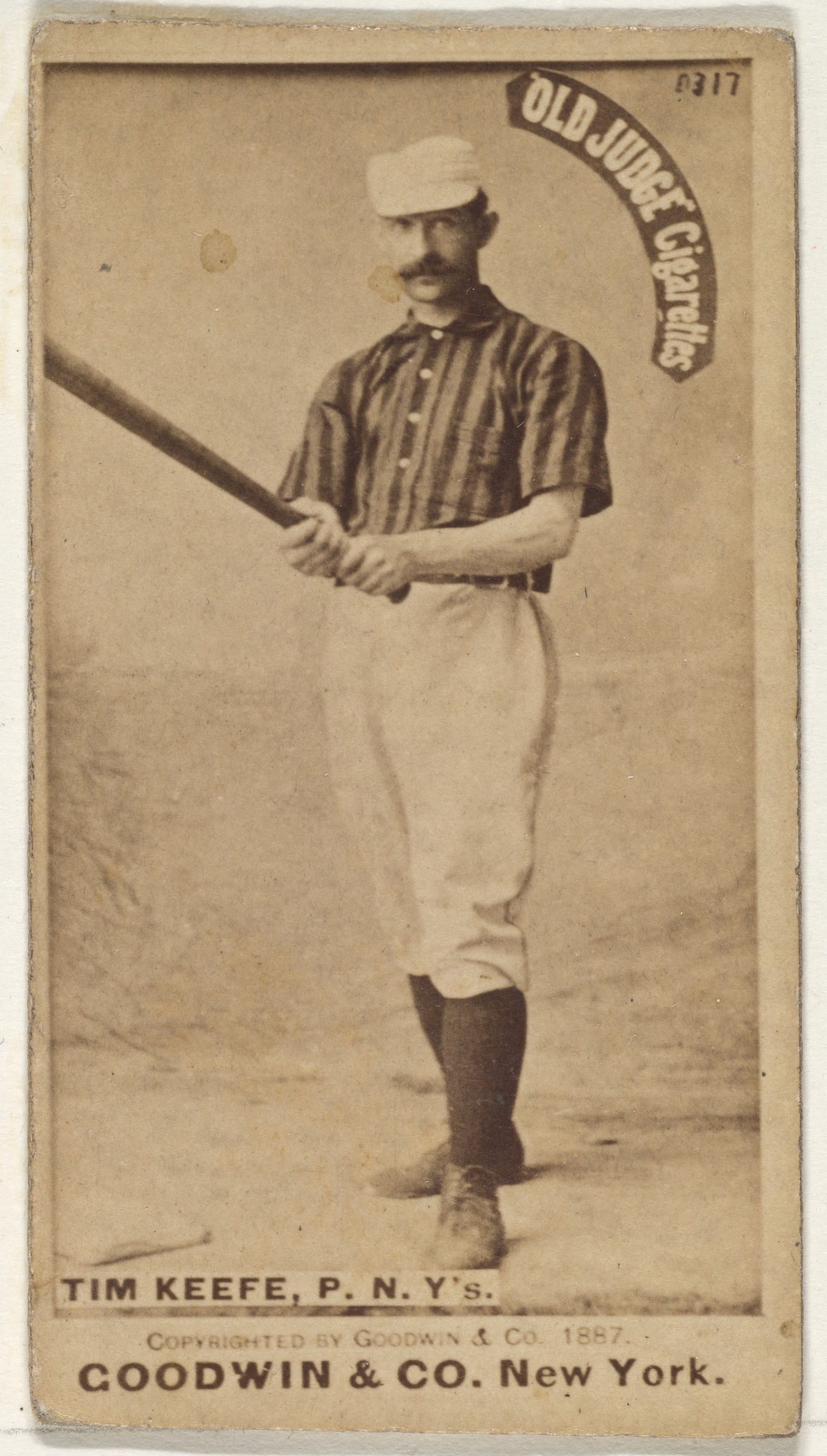
- Keefe in 1887
- Pitcher
- Born: January 1, 1857; Cambridge, Massachusetts, U.S.
- Died: April 23, 1933 (aged 76); Cambridge, Massachusetts, U.S.
- Batted: Right Threw: Right

MLB debut
- August 6, 1880, for the Troy Trojans

Last MLB appearance
- August 15, 1893, for the Philadelphia Phillies

MLB statistics
- Win–loss record: 342–225
- Earned run average: 2.62
- Strikeouts: 2,562
- Stats at Baseball Reference

Teams
- Troy Trojans (1880–1882); New York Metropolitans (1883–1884); New York Giants (1885–1889); New York Giants (PL) (1890); New York Giants (1891); Philadelphia Phillies (1891–1893)

Career highlights and awards
- Triple Crown (1888); 2× NL wins leader (1886, 1888); 3× NL ERA leader (1880, 1885, 1888); NL strikeout leader (1888); MLB record 0.86 ERA, single season

Member of the National

Baseball Hall of Fame
- Induction: 1964
- Election method: Veterans Committee

Timothy John Keefe (January 1, 1857 – April 23, 1933), nicknamed "Smiling Tim" and "Sir Timothy", was an American professional baseball pitcher in Major League Baseball. He stood 5 feet 10 inches (1.78 m) tall and weighed 185 pounds (84 kg). He was one of the most dominating pitchers of the 19th century and posted impressive statistics in one category or another for almost every season he pitched. He was the second MLB pitcher to record 300 wins. He was elected to the Baseball Hall of Fame in 1964.

Keefe's career spanned much of baseball's formative stages. His first season was the last in which pitchers threw from 45 feet, so for most of his career he pitched from 50 feet. His final season was the first season in which pitchers hurled from the modern distance of 60 feet, 6 inches.

== Early life ==
Keefe was born on January 1, 1857, in Cambridge, Massachusetts. His father, Patrick, was an Irish immigrant who served in the Union Army during the American Civil War and was a prisoner of war for several years. All four of Patrick's brothers were killed in the war; Tim had been named after two of them. Tim's brother became a major and fought in the Spanish–American War.

After the war, Patrick had high expectations for his son, and the two frequently fought over Tim's pursuit of baseball. With the help of local former pitcher Tommy Bond, Keefe persisted and became known as a standout local pitcher by 1876. Keefe's early professional career included minor league stints in Lewiston, Clinton, New Bedford, Utica, and Albany.

== Major league career ==
Keefe entered the major leagues in 1880 with the Troy Trojans. He immediately established himself as a talented pitcher, posting an astounding 0.86 earned run average (ERA) in 105 innings pitched, a record that still stands. He also posted the best Adjusted ERA+ in a season in baseball history in 1880 at 293. Despite the sterling ERA, he managed only a 6–6 record, pitching in 12 games, all complete games, with 39 strikeouts and a stellar 0.800 WHIP.

In 1883, after the Trojans folded, Keefe rose to stardom with the New York Metropolitans of the American Association under manager "Gentleman" Jim Mutrie and had one of the most dominating seasons in baseball's early history. On July 4 of that year, Keefe pitched both ends of a doubleheader against Columbus, winning the first game with a one-hitter; the second a two-hit gem. He went 41–27 over 619 innings pitched with a 2.41 ERA and 361 strikeouts. His 1884 campaign was almost as dominant, winning 37 games, losing 17, and striking out 334.

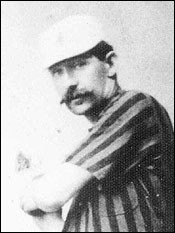
Tim Keefe

In 1885, John B. Day, who owned the Metropolitans and the New York Giants of the National League, moved Keefe and Mutrie to the Giants. Here, Keefe joined future Hall of Famers Buck Ewing, Monte Ward, Roger Connor, Mickey Welch, and "Orator" Jim O'Rourke to form an outstanding team that finished with a fine 85–27 record. Keefe went 32–13 with a 1.58 ERA and 227 strikeouts. In 1887, Keefe sat out several weeks of the season after he struck a batter in the head with a pitch; he was said to have suffered a nervous breakdown.

He had arguably his greatest season in 1888, when he led the league with a 35–12 record, 1.74 ERA and 335 strikeouts, becoming baseball's 4th pitcher to win a Triple Crown, after Tommy Bond in 1877 and Guy Hecker and Charles Radbourn in 1884. He won 19 consecutive games that season, a record that stood for 24 years. The Giants played the St. Louis Browns of the American Association in a postseason series for the Dauvray Cup, and Keefe added four more wins to his tally. Keefe even designed the famous all-black "funeral" uniforms the Giants wore that season.

Keefe was very well paid for his career and was a leading member of the Brotherhood of Professional Base Ball Players, an early players' union that fought for the welfare of players. He assisted his brother-in-law Monte Ward to form the Players' League for the 1890 season. As a co-organizer of the Players' League, he recognized that he might be financially vulnerable if the league failed to make money. Keefe transferred ownership of his real estate assets to his mother so that they would remain safe from any legal rulings.

Shortly before the Players' League was founded, Keefe had started a sporting goods business in New York with W. H. Becannon, a former employee of baseball owner and sporting goods entrepreneur Albert Spalding. Keefe and Becannon manufactured the Keefe ball, the official baseball of the league. Spalding and the other NL owners fought against the new league, employing legal and financial maneuvers (such as slashing NL ticket prices) that made competition difficult. The Players' League folded after one season.

In the 1891 preseason, Keefe refused a salary offer of $3,000 from New York; he had earned $4,500 in the previous season. Keefe said, "I want to play in New York, but I never will for a $3,000 salary... To tell you the truth, however, I do not think I am wanted in the New York team, and this cutting method is being pursued to keep me out." Keefe ultimately signed with the team for a $3,500 salary.

During the 1891 season, Keefe was released by New York. He was drawing a high salary and was not meeting the expectations of the team's leadership. After his release, Keefe said, "I hate to leave New York, am very fond of it, and would do all in my power for New York, but what am I to do? I have been systematically done by the New York Baseball Club... They would not let me play, and when I did get a chance, I worked under a disadvantage. I feel that I am just as good a player as I ever was."

Keefe moved to the Philadelphia Phillies after his release from the Giants. He retired after the 1893 season with 342 wins (10th all time), a 2.62 ERA, and 2,562 strikeouts. His 2,562 strikeouts were a major league record at the time of his retirement. He was also the first pitcher to achieve three 300-plus strikeout seasons, done during his dominating prime in the 1880s in which he won the most games of the decade with 291, four more than Pud Galvin's 287. He still holds the record for having wins in the most ballparks, with 47.

Keefe was nicknamed "Sir Timothy" because of his gentlemanly behavior on and off the field. He never drank or smoked.

== Later life and legacy ==
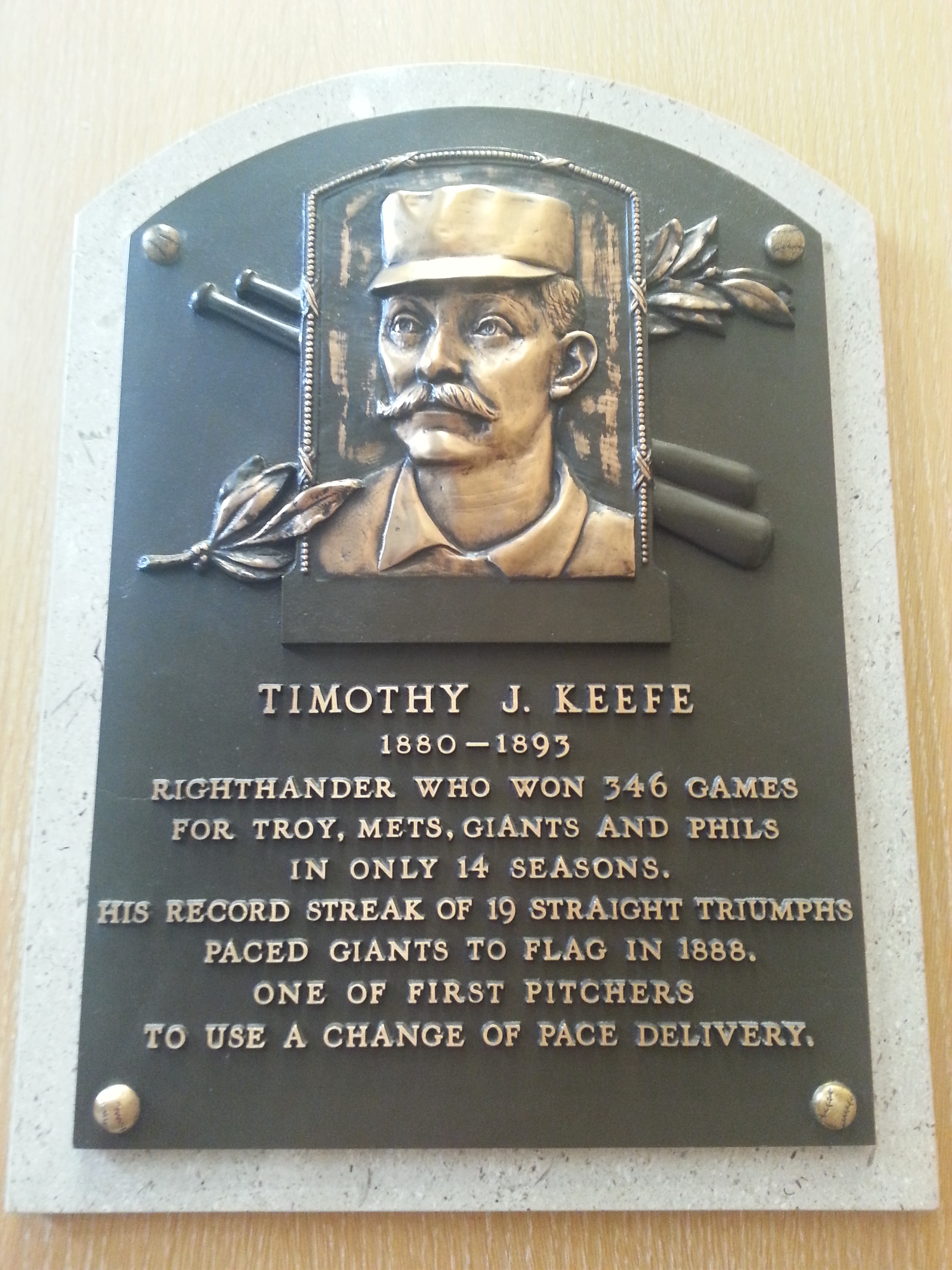
Plaque of Tim Keefe at the Baseball Hall of Fame

Late in his playing career, Keefe began to coach college baseball and he continued in this capacity after his retirement as a player. Beginning in the spring of 1893, Keefe began to work as a pitching coach for Harvard. Keefe also worked as an umpire for a total of 243 major league games; his most active year was 1895, when he umpired 129 games. He was also involved in real estate. He died in his hometown of Cambridge, Massachusetts, at the age of 76.

Keefe was inducted into the Baseball Hall of Fame in 1964 after being elected by the Veterans Committee. Six players were inducted that year, and Keefe was one of five who had been voted in by the Veterans Committee.

== Career statistics ==
- Official career statistics as recognized by Baseball-Reference.com.

W	L	ERA	G	GS	CG	SHO	SV	IP	H	R	ER	HR	BB	SO	WP	HBP
342	225	2.62	600	594	554	39	2	5047.2	4439	2468	1472	81	1220	2562	233	*96

- ' * ' denotes stats that were not officially recognized during parts or all of his career, and are incomplete.

== See also ==
- Major League Baseball Triple Crown
- List of Major League Baseball career hit batsmen leaders
- List of Major League Baseball career wins leaders
- List of Major League Baseball career strikeout leaders
- List of Major League Baseball annual ERA leaders
- List of Major League Baseball annual strikeout leaders
- List of Major League Baseball annual wins leaders

Preceded by Charlie Radbourn	National League Pitching Triple Crown; 1888	Succeeded by John Clarkson
