= Thorny Hawkes =

American baseball player (1852–1929)

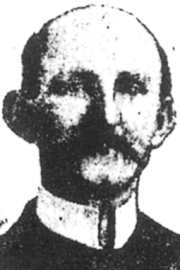
- Second baseman
- Born: October 15, 1852; Danvers, Massachusetts, U.S.
- Died: February 2, 1929 (aged 76); Danvers, Massachusetts, U.S.
- Batted: Right Threw: Right

MLB debut
- May 1, 1879, for the Troy Trojans

Last MLB appearance
- August 2, 1884, for the Washington Nationals (UA)

MLB statistics
- Games played: 102
- Hits: 94
- Runs scored: 40
- Stats at Baseball Reference

Teams
- Troy Trojans (1879); Washington Nationals (UA) (1884)

Thorndike Proctor "Thorny" Hawkes (October 15, 1852 – February 2, 1929) was an American Major League Baseball second baseman, who played a total of two seasons in the Majors.

== Career ==
Hawkes began his career playing for teams in his hometown of Danvers, Massachusetts. He then played for the Lynn Live Oaks and for Manchester of the New England League.

In his first major league season was in 1879 for the Troy Trojans. He played 64 games as the team's starting second baseman, and batted .208 in 250 at bats. On July 30, 1879, he set two records by fielding 18 chances without an error and making 12 putouts without an error.

His second was with the 1884 Washington Nationals of the short-lived Union Association. He played in 38 games as the team's starting second baseman, and batted .278 in 151 at bats. He finished his career with 102 games played, a .234 batting average, scored 40 runs, ten doubles, and did not hit a home run.

After retiring from baseball, Hawkes worked as a pharmacist and owned a drugstore in Danvers for many years.

Hawkes died at the age of 76 in Danvers and is interred at Holten Street Cemetery.
