= Al Hall (baseball) =

American baseball player

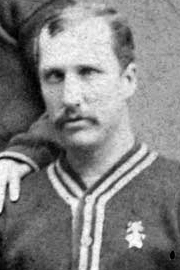
- Outfielder
- Born: Unknown; Worcester, Massachusetts, U.S.
- Died: February 10, 1885; Warren, Pennsylvania, U.S.
- Batted: Unknown Threw: Unknown

MLB debut
- May 1, 1879, for the Troy Trojans

Last MLB appearance
- 1880, for the Cleveland Blues

MLB statistics
- Batting average: .255
- Home runs: 0
- Runs batted in: 14
- Stats at Baseball Reference

Teams
- Troy Trojans (1879); Cleveland Blues (1880)

Archibald W. Hall (unknown – February 10, 1885) was an American outfielder in Major League Baseball for the 1879 Troy Trojans and 1880 Cleveland Blues.

== Sources ==
- Career statistics from Baseball Reference · Baseball Reference (Minors) · Retrosheet · Baseball Almanac
