= Troy Trojans (National League) =

Major League Baseball team

Information
- League: National League
- Location: Troy, New York; Watervliet, New York
- Ballpark: Troy Ball Clubs Grounds
- Founded: 1879
- Folded: 1882
- Former ballpark(s): Haymakers' Grounds, Putnam Grounds
- Colors: Green, orange
- Manager: Bob Ferguson (1879–1882), Horace Phillips (1879)

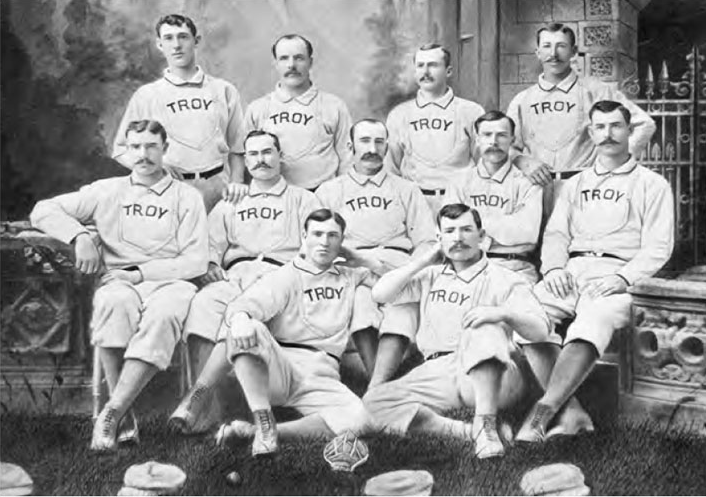
1881 Troy Trojans

The Troy Trojans were a Major League Baseball team in the National League for four seasons from 1879 to 1882. Their home games were played at Putnam Grounds (1879) and Haymakers' Grounds (1880–1881) in the upstate New York city of Troy, and at Troy Ball Clubs Grounds (1882) across the Hudson in Watervliet, or "West Troy" as it was known at the time.

The first grand slam home run in Major League history was hit by Roger Connor of the Trojans in 1881 in East Albany (now known as Rensselaer) in what is now the Rensselaer Riverfront Park. The site in present day Rensselaer was infrequently used to host games when their normal field was unavailable. A baseball diamond in the park is currently in use very close to where the diamond would have been back in the 1880s. The site of the historic grand slam was only recently discovered as it was previously assumed to have occurred in eastern Albany. Overall, the franchise won 131 games and lost 194. The Trojans, along with the Worcester NL team, were expelled from the league shortly before the end of the 1882 season, as Troy and Worcester were seen as too small for the league's ambitions, but were encouraged to play out the rest of their seasons as lame-duck teams. The club was placed on the league's roll of honorary membership.

On September 28, 1882, only 6 fans appeared to watch Worcester host the Trojans in the second-to-last game of the season, then only 25 arrived for the last game between the two teams. Among games that have had at least one paying attendee, the attendance figure of 6 is the lowest attendance ever recorded at a Major League Baseball game. In 1883 the New York Gothams, later known as the Giants, took the Trojans' former slot in the National League. Four of the original Gotham players were former members of the disbanded Trojans, including three future Hall of Famers: Buck Ewing, Roger Connor and Mickey Welch.

Notable players for the Trojans included Hall of Famers Dan Brouthers, Connor, Ewing, Tim Keefe, and Welch.

Another Troy Trojans minor league team continued play until at least 1916.

== Baseball Hall of Famers ==
Troy Trojans Hall of Famers
Inductee	Position	Tenure	Inducted
Dan Brouthers	1B	1879–1880	1945
Roger Connor	1B	1880–1882	1976
Buck Ewing	C/3B	1880–1882	1939
Tim Keefe	P	1880–1882	1964
Mickey Welch	P	1880–1882	1973

== Putnam Grounds ==
Putnam Grounds
- Interactive map of Putnam Grounds
- Location: Troy, New York
- Coordinates: 42°44′00″N 73°40′34″W
- Surface: Grass

Tenant
- Troy Trojans (NL) (1879)

Putnam Grounds in Troy, New York was a sports ground which was home to the Troy Trojans baseball club from May 28, 1879 to September 20, 1879. It was located at Peoples Ave and 15th St, close to the public park known as Beman Park.

== Riverside Park ==
Riverside Park
- Greenbush Grounds
- Interactive map of Riverside Park
- Location: Greenbush, New York
- Coordinates: 42°38′48″N 73°44′36″W
- Surface: Grass

Tenant
- Troy Trojans (NL) (1880–1882)

Riverside Park in Greenbush, New York (now Rensselaer) was a sports ground which was home to the Troy Trojans baseball club for seven games, from 1880 to 1882, located on what was Van Rensselaer Island. It was the site of the first major-league grand slam, a walk-off home run in the bottom of the ninth with two outs, by Roger Connor on September 10, 1881 for the Troy Trojans against the Worcester Worcesters, leading to an 8–7 victory.

== See also ==
- 1879 Troy Trojans season
- 1880 Troy Trojans season
- 1881 Troy Trojans season
- 1882 Troy Trojans season
- Troy Trojans all-time roster
