= 1883 Philadelphia Quakers season =

National League season

1883 Philadelphia Quakers
- League: National League
- Ballpark: Recreation Park
- City: Philadelphia
- Record: 17–81 (.173)
- League place: 8th
- Owners: Al Reach, John Rogers
- Managers: Bob Ferguson, Blondie Purcell

The 1883 season was the first in the history of the Philadelphia Phillies. The team was founded earlier in the year as a replacement for the Worcester franchise. It was the first year Philadelphia was represented in the National League since the original Athletics were disbanded in 1876 after refusing to finish the season. The American Association's Philadelphia Athletics had been founded a year earlier.

The team opened the year managed by Bob Ferguson; however, he was fired as manager after a disappointing 4–13 start and replaced by Blondie Purcell. The team finished the season 17–81, worst in the National League.

== Preseason ==
The Phillies played their first game ever on April 2, 1883, and defeated the amateur Manayunk Ashlands in an exhibition game by the score of 11–0 at Recreation Park.

== Regular season ==
The Phillies hosted Providence at Recreation Park in their first regular season game on May 1, 1883. One thousand fans saw John Coleman start the game for the Phillies and relinquish the first hit in the first inning to Providence first baseman Joe Start. The Phillies scored first and took a three to zero lead into the eighth inning when Providence scored four times to win the game. The Phillies would lose their first eleven games, and not win their first game at home in Philadelphia until June 6, 1883.

=== Season standings ===
National League
Team	W	L	Pct.	GB	Home	Road
Boston Beaneaters	63	35	.643	—	41‍–‍8	22‍–‍27
Chicago White Stockings	59	39	.602	4	36‍–‍13	23‍–‍26
Providence Grays	58	40	.592	5	34‍–‍15	24‍–‍25
Cleveland Blues	55	42	.567	7½	31‍–‍18	24‍–‍24
Buffalo Bisons	49	45	.521	12	36‍–‍13	13‍–‍32
New York Gothams	46	50	.479	16	28‍–‍19	18‍–‍31
Detroit Wolverines	40	58	.408	23	23‍–‍26	17‍–‍32
Philadelphia Quakers	17	81	.173	46	9‍–‍40	8‍–‍41

=== Record vs. opponents ===
1883 National League record Sources:
Team	BSN	BUF	CHI	CLE	DET	NYG	PHI	PRO
Boston	—	7–7	7–7	10–4	10–4	7–7	14–0	8–6
Buffalo	7–7	—	5–9	7–7	9–5–1	8–5	9–5	7–7
Chicago	7–7	9–5	—	6–8	9–5	9–5	12–2	7–7
Cleveland	4–10	7–7	8–6	—	9–5–1	7–6–2	12–2	8–6
Detroit	4–10	5–9–1	5–9	5–9–1	—	8–6	11–3–1	2–12
New York	7–7	5–8	5–9	6–7–2	6–8	—	12–2	5–9
Philadelphia	0–14	5–9	2–12	2–12	3–11–1	2–12	—	3–11
Providence	6–8	7–7	7–7	6–8	12–2	9–5	11–3	—

=== Roster ===
1883 Philadelphia Quakers
Roster
Pitchers: Alonzo Breitenstein; John Coleman; Art Hagan; Hardie Henderson; Charlie Hilsey; Edgar Smith	Catchers: Emil Gross; Frank Ringo; Abe Wolstenholme; Infielders: Art Benedict; Sid Farrar; Bob Ferguson; Buck Gladmon; Charlie Kelly; Bill McClellan; Joe Mulvey; James Pirie; Blondie Purcell; Robert Ward; Fred Warner; Bill White	Outfielders: Conny Doyle; Bill Gallagher; Bill Harbridge; John Kelly; Fred Lewis; Jack Manning; Jack Neagle; Charlie Waitt	Manager: Bob Ferguson; Blondie Purcell

== Player stats ==
=== Batting ===
==== Starters by position ====
Note: Pos = Position; G = Games played; AB = At bats; H = Hits; Avg. = Batting average; HR = Home runs; RBI = Runs batted in

Pos	Player	G	AB	H	Avg.	HR	RBI
C	Emil Gross	57	231	71	.307	1	25
1B	Sid Farrar	99	377	88	.233	0	29
2B	Bob Ferguson	86	329	85	.258	0	27
3B	Blondie Purcell	97	425	114	.268	1	32
SS	Bill McClellan	80	326	75	.230	1	33
OF	Bill Harbridge	73	280	62	.221	0	21
OF	Jack Manning	98	420	112	.267	0	37
OF	Fred Lewis	38	160	40	.250	0	18

==== Other batters ====
Note: G = Games played; AB = At bats; H = Hits; Avg. = Batting average; HR = Home runs; RBI = Runs batted in

Player	G	AB	H	Avg.	HR	RBI
John Coleman	90	354	83	.234	0	32
Frank Ringo	60	221	42	.190	0	12
Fred Warner	39	141	32	.227	0	13
Jack Neagle	18	73	12	.164	0	4
Conny Doyle	16	68	15	.221	0	3
James Pirie	5	19	3	.158	0	0
Art Benedict	3	15	4	.267	0	4
Joe Mulvey	3	12	6	.500	0	3
Abe Wolstenholme	3	11	1	.091	0	0
Bill Gallagher	2	8	0	.000	0	0
Hardie Henderson	2	8	2	.250	0	1
Charlie Kelly	2	7	1	.143	0	0
Piggy Ward	1	5	0	.000	0	0
Edgar Smith	1	4	3	.750	0	1
Buck Gladmon	1	4	0	.000	0	0
Charlie Waitt	1	3	1	.333	0	0
John Kelly	1	3	0	.000	0	0
Bill White	1	1	0	.000	0	0

=== Pitching ===
==== Starting pitchers ====
Note: G = Games pitched; IP = Innings pitched; W = Wins; L = Losses; ERA = Earned run average; SO = Strikeouts

Player	G	IP	W	L	ERA	SO
John Coleman	65	538.1	12	48	4.87	159
Art Hagan	17	137.0	1	14	5.45	39
Blondie Purcell	11	80.0	2	6	4.39	30
Jack Neagle	8	61.1	1	7	6.90	13
Charlie Hilsey	3	26.0	0	3	5.54	8
Hardie Henderson	1	9.0	0	1	19.00	2
Edgar Smith	1	7.0	0	1	15.43	2
Alonzo Breitenstein	1	5.0	0	1	9.00	0

==== Relief pitchers ====
Note: G = Games pitched; W = Wins; L = Losses; SV = Saves; ERA = Earned run average; SO = Strikeouts

Player	G	W	L	SV	ERA	SO
Bob Ferguson	1	0	0	0	9.00	0
