= 1883 Detroit Wolverines season =

1883 Detroit Wolverines
- League: National League
- Ballpark: Recreation Park
- City: Detroit, Michigan
- Record: 40–58 (.408)
- League place: 7th
- Owner: Joseph Marsh
- Manager: Jack Chapman

The 1883 Detroit Wolverines finished the season with a 40–58 record, good for seventh place in the National League.

== Regular season ==
=== Season standings ===
National League
Team	W	L	Pct.	GB	Home	Road
Boston Beaneaters	63	35	.643	—	41‍–‍8	22‍–‍27
Chicago White Stockings	59	39	.602	4	36‍–‍13	23‍–‍26
Providence Grays	58	40	.592	5	34‍–‍15	24‍–‍25
Cleveland Blues	55	42	.567	7½	31‍–‍18	24‍–‍24
Buffalo Bisons	49	45	.521	12	36‍–‍13	13‍–‍32
New York Gothams	46	50	.479	16	28‍–‍19	18‍–‍31
Detroit Wolverines	40	58	.408	23	23‍–‍26	17‍–‍32
Philadelphia Quakers	17	81	.173	46	9‍–‍40	8‍–‍41

=== Record vs. opponents ===
1883 National League record Sources:
Team	BSN	BUF	CHI	CLE	DET	NYG	PHI	PRO
Boston	—	7–7	7–7	10–4	10–4	7–7	14–0	8–6
Buffalo	7–7	—	5–9	7–7	9–5–1	8–5	9–5	7–7
Chicago	7–7	9–5	—	6–8	9–5	9–5	12–2	7–7
Cleveland	4–10	7–7	8–6	—	9–5–1	7–6–2	12–2	8–6
Detroit	4–10	5–9–1	5–9	5–9–1	—	8–6	11–3–1	2–12
New York	7–7	5–8	5–9	6–7–2	6–8	—	12–2	5–9
Philadelphia	0–14	5–9	2–12	2–12	3–11–1	2–12	—	3–11
Providence	6–8	7–7	7–7	6–8	12–2	9–5	11–3	—

=== Roster ===
1883 Detroit Wolverines
Roster
Pitchers: Jumping Jack Jones; Frank McIntyre; George Radbourn; Dupee Shaw; Stump Weidman	Catchers: Charlie Bennett; Infielders: Joe Farrell; Sadie Houck; Martin Powell; Joe Quest; Sam Trott	Outfielders: Dick Burns; Ben Guiney; Ned Hanlon; Tom Mansell; George Wood	Manager: Jack Chapman

== Player stats ==
=== Batting ===
==== Starters by position ====
Note: Pos = Position; G = Games played; AB = At bats; H = Hits; Avg. = Batting average; HR = Home runs; RBI = Runs batted in

Pos	Player	G	AB	H	Avg.	HR	RBI
C	Charlie Bennett	92	371	113	.305	5	55
1B	Martin Powell	101	421	115	.273	1	48
2B	Sam Trott	75	295	72	.244	0	29
3B	Joe Farrell	101	444	108	.243	0	36
SS	Sadie Houck	101	416	105	.252	0	40
OF	Ned Hanlon	100	413	100	.242	1	40
OF	Stump Weidman	79	313	58	.185	1	24
OF	George Wood	99	441	113	.302	5	47

==== Other batters ====
Note: G = Games played; AB = At bats; H = Hits; Avg. = Batting average; HR = Home runs; RBI = Runs batted in

Player	G	AB	H	Avg.	HR	RBI
Dick Burns	37	140	26	.186	0	5
Joe Quest	37	137	32	.234	0	15
Tom Mansell	34	131	29	.221	0	10
Ben Guiney	1	5	1	.200	0	0

=== Pitching ===
==== Starting pitchers ====
Note: G = Games pitched; IP = Innings pitched; W = Wins; L = Losses; ERA = Earned run average; SO = Strikeouts

Player	G	IP	W	L	ERA	SO
Stump Weidman	52	402.1	20	24	3.53	183
Dupee Shaw	26	227.0	10	15	2.50	73
Dick Burns	17	127.2	2	12	4.51	30
Jack Jones	12	92.2	6	5	3.50	33
George Radbourn	3	22.0	1	2	6.55	2
Frank McIntyre	1	11.0	1	0	0.82	0

==== Relief pitchers ====
Note: G = Games pitched; W = Wins; L = Losses; SV = Saves; ERA = Earned run average; SO = Strikeouts

Player	G	W	L	SV	ERA	SO
Tom Mansell	1	0	0	0	18.90	3
George Wood	1	0	0	0	7.20	0

== Game log ==
Legend
Detroit win	Detroit loss

1883 Game Log (40–58)
May (12–8)

#	Date	Opponent	W/L	Score	Record	Pitcher
1	May 1	CHI	L	4-7	0-1	Weidman
2	May 2	CHI	L	3-5	0-2	Weidman
3	May 3	CHI	L	1-10	0-3	Burns
4	May 5	@CHI	W	3-2	1-3	Weidman
5	May 7	@CHI	W	7-0	2-3	Weidman
6	May 9	@CHI	W	17-7	3-3	Weidman
7	May 11	NY	W	12-1	4-3	Weidman
8	May 12	NY	W	9-5	5-3	Burns
9	May 15	PHI	L	3-4	5-4	Burns
10	May 16	PHI	W	11-10	6-4	McIntyre
11	May 17	PHI	W	12-6	7-4	Weidman
12	May 18	NY	L	6-11	7-5	Burns
13	May 19	PRO	W	7-5	8-5	Weidman
14	May 23	PRO	W	6-4	9-5	Weidman
15	May 24	BOS	W	5-1	10-5	Weidman
16	May 25	BOS	W	8-3	11-5	Weidman
17	May 28	BOS	L	4-10	11-6	Weidman
18	May 30	@NY	W	5-2	12-6	Radbourn
19	May 30	@NY	L	4-8	12-7	Weidman
20	May 31	@NY	L	1-4	12-8	Weidman
