= 1883 Providence Grays season =

Major League Baseball season

1883 Providence Grays
- League: National League
- Ballpark: Messer Street Grounds
- City: Providence, Rhode Island
- Record: 58–40 (.592)
- League place: 3rd
- Owner: C. T. Gardner
- Manager: Harry Wright

The Providence Grays finished the 1883 season in third place after a hard-fought four-way battle for the National League pennant.

== Regular season ==
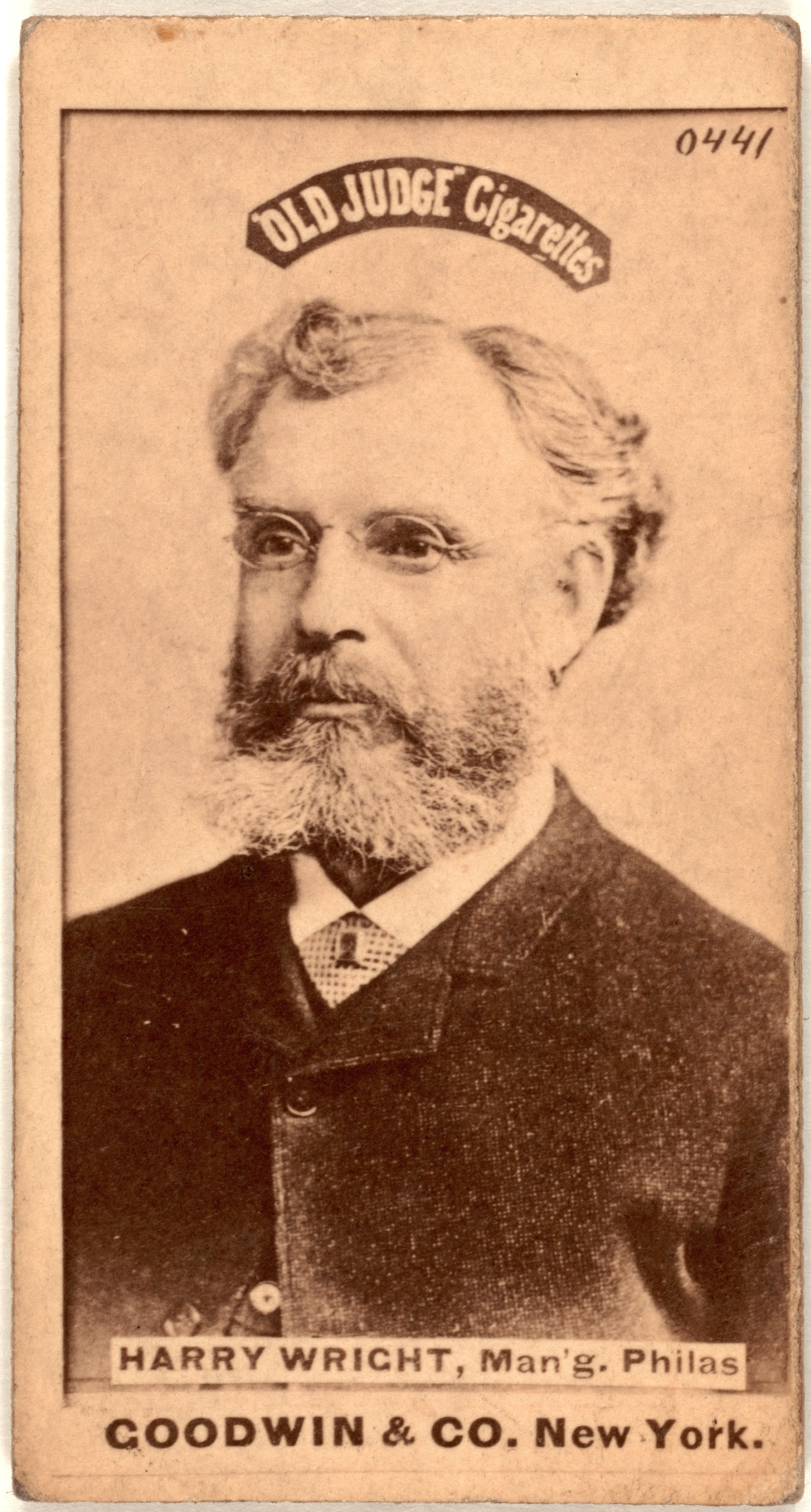
Manager Harry Wright

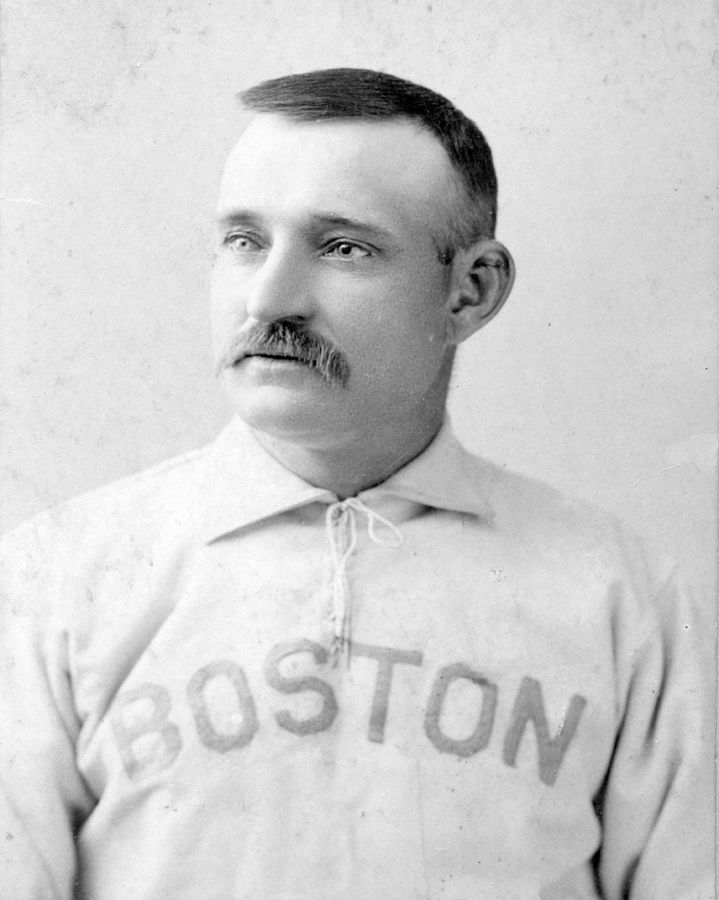
Pitcher Charles Radbourn

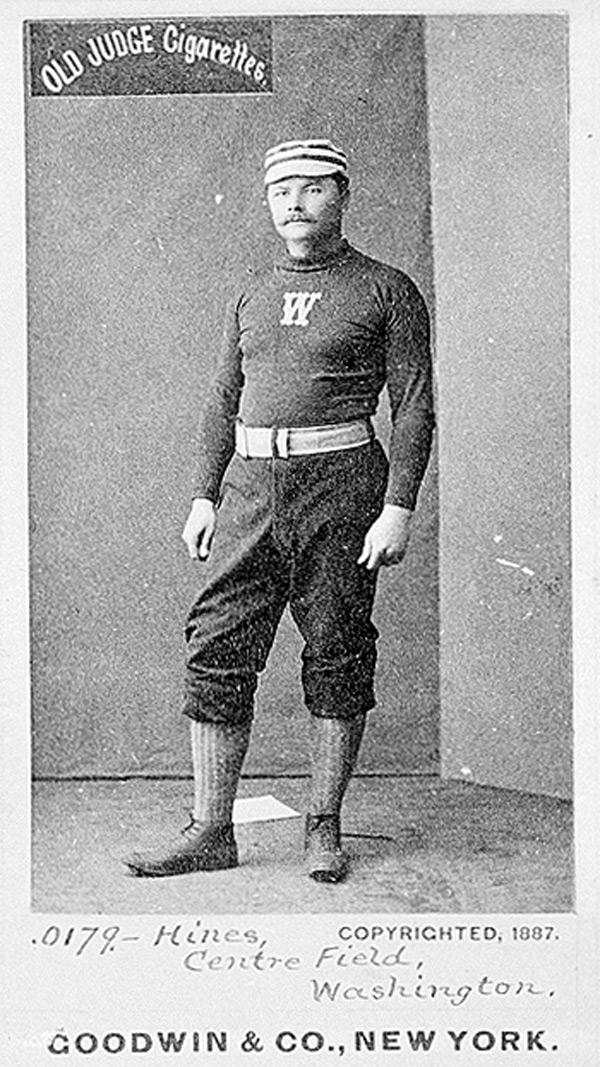
Center fielder Paul Hines

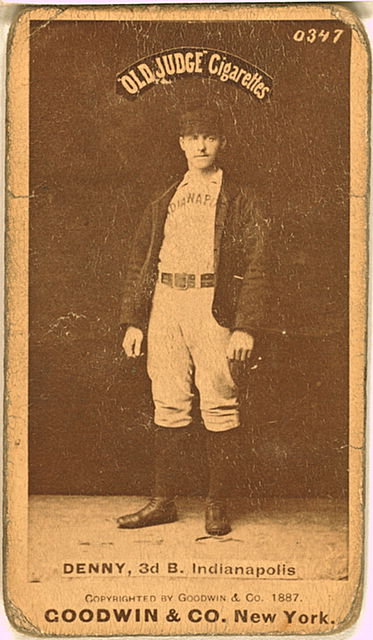
Third baseman Jerry Denny

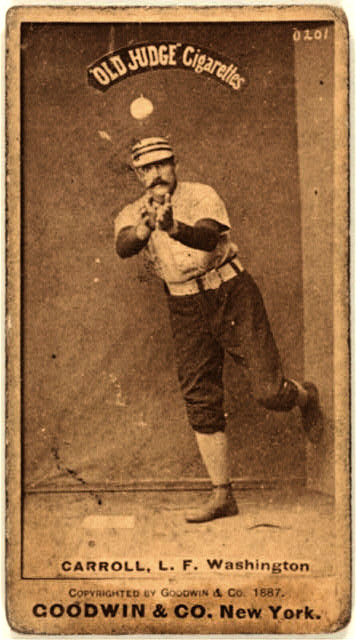
Left fielder Cliff Carroll

=== Season standings ===
National League
Team	W	L	Pct.	GB	Home	Road
Boston Beaneaters	63	35	.643	—	41‍–‍8	22‍–‍27
Chicago White Stockings	59	39	.602	4	36‍–‍13	23‍–‍26
Providence Grays	58	40	.592	5	34‍–‍15	24‍–‍25
Cleveland Blues	55	42	.567	7½	31‍–‍18	24‍–‍24
Buffalo Bisons	49	45	.521	12	36‍–‍13	13‍–‍32
New York Gothams	46	50	.479	16	28‍–‍19	18‍–‍31
Detroit Wolverines	40	58	.408	23	23‍–‍26	17‍–‍32
Philadelphia Quakers	17	81	.173	46	9‍–‍40	8‍–‍41

=== Record vs. opponents ===
1883 National League record Sources:
Team	BSN	BUF	CHI	CLE	DET	NYG	PHI	PRO
Boston	—	7–7	7–7	10–4	10–4	7–7	14–0	8–6
Buffalo	7–7	—	5–9	7–7	9–5–1	8–5	9–5	7–7
Chicago	7–7	9–5	—	6–8	9–5	9–5	12–2	7–7
Cleveland	4–10	7–7	8–6	—	9–5–1	7–6–2	12–2	8–6
Detroit	4–10	5–9–1	5–9	5–9–1	—	8–6	11–3–1	2–12
New York	7–7	5–8	5–9	6–7–2	6–8	—	12–2	5–9
Philadelphia	0–14	5–9	2–12	2–12	3–11–1	2–12	—	3–11
Providence	6–8	7–7	7–7	6–8	12–2	9–5	11–3	—

=== Roster ===
1883 Providence Grays
Roster
Pitchers: Old Hoss Radbourn; Charlie Sweeney; Catchers: Barney Gilligan; Sandy Nava	Infielders: Jerry Denny; Jack Farrell; Arthur Irwin; Joe Mulvey; Edgar Smith; Joe Start	Outfielders: Cliff Carroll; John Cassidy; Paul Hines; Lee Richmond	Manager: Harry Wright

== Player stats ==
=== Batting ===
==== Starters by position ====
Note: Pos = Position; G = Games played; AB = At bats; H = Hits; Avg. = Batting average; HR = Home runs; RBI = Runs batted in

Pos	Player	G	AB	H	Avg.	HR	RBI
C	Barney Gilligan	74	263	52	.198	0	24
1B	Joe Start	87	370	105	.284	1	57
2B	Jack Farrell	95	420	128	.305	3	61
3B	Jerry Denny	98	393	108	.275	8	55
SS	Arthur Irwin	98	406	116	.286	0	44
OF	Paul Hines	97	442	132	.299	4	45
OF	John Cassidy	89	366	87	.238	0	42
OF	Cliff Carroll	58	238	63	.265	1	20

==== Other batters ====
Note: G = Games played; AB = At bats; H = Hits; Avg. = Batting average; HR = Home runs; RBI = Runs batted in

Player	G	AB	H	Avg.	HR	RBI
Lee Richmond	49	194	55	.284	1	19
Sandy Nava	29	100	24	.240	0	16
Joe Mulvey	4	16	2	.125	0	2
Edgar Smith	2	9	2	.222	0	1

=== Pitching ===
==== Starting pitchers ====
Note: G = Games pitched; IP = Innings pitched; W = Wins; L = Losses; ERA = Earned run average; SO = Strikeouts

Player	G	IP	W	L	ERA	SO
Old Hoss Radbourn	76	632.1	48	25	2.05	315
Charlie Sweeney	20	146.2	7	7	3.13	48
Lee Richmond	12	92.0	3	7	3.33	13
