= 1883 New York Gothams season =

1883 New York Gothams
- League: National League
- Ballpark: Polo Grounds
- City: New York City
- Record: 46–50 (.479)
- League place: 6th
- Owner: John B. Day
- Manager: John Clapp

The 1883 New York Gothams season was the first professional baseball season played by the team now known as the San Francisco Giants. The team replaced the Troy Trojans when the National League awarded its franchise rights to John B. Day. The team went 46–50, finishing in sixth place.

== Regular season ==
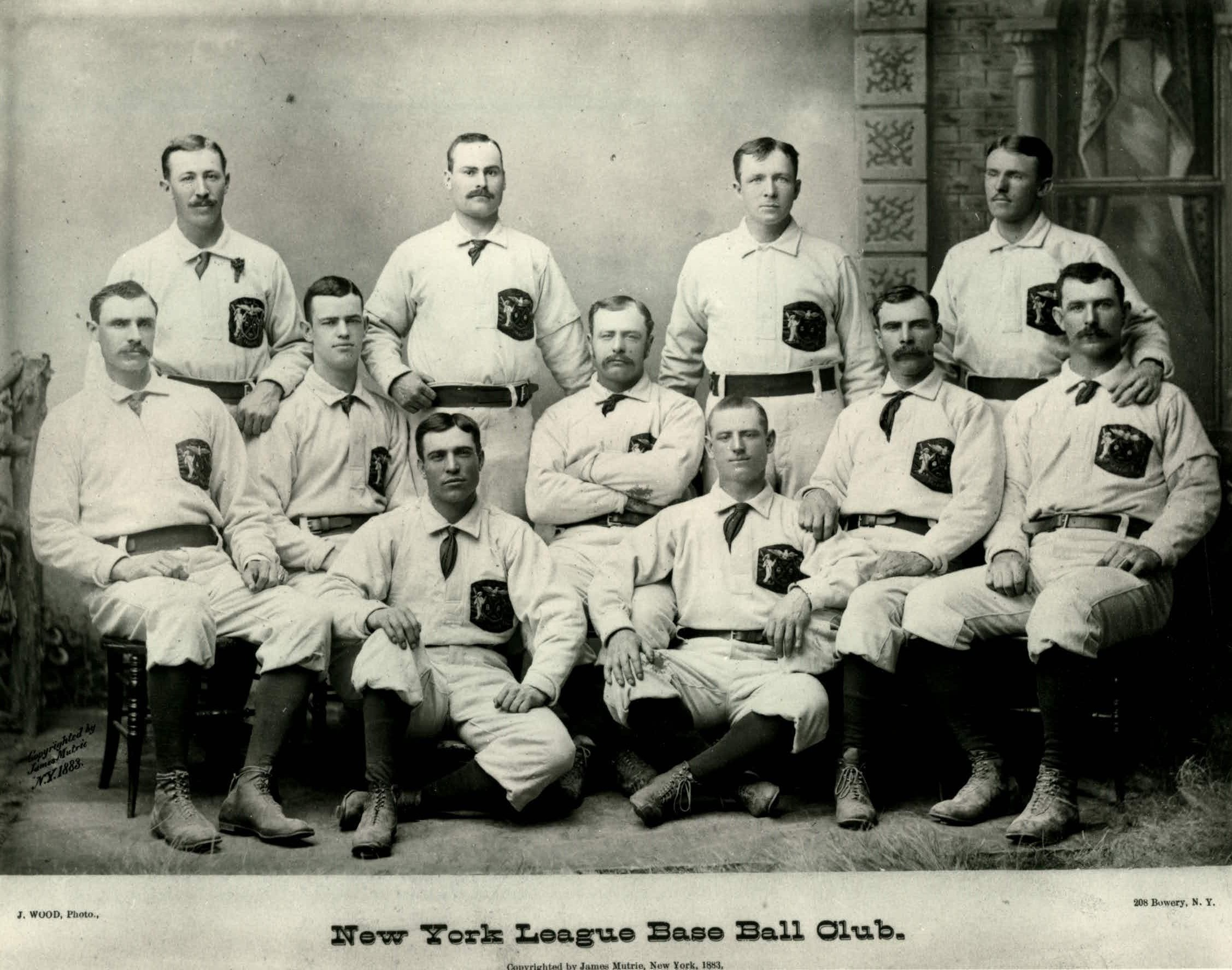
1883 New York Gothams

=== Season standings ===
National League
Team	W	L	Pct.	GB	Home	Road
Boston Beaneaters	63	35	.643	—	41‍–‍8	22‍–‍27
Chicago White Stockings	59	39	.602	4	36‍–‍13	23‍–‍26
Providence Grays	58	40	.592	5	34‍–‍15	24‍–‍25
Cleveland Blues	55	42	.567	7½	31‍–‍18	24‍–‍24
Buffalo Bisons	49	45	.521	12	36‍–‍13	13‍–‍32
New York Gothams	46	50	.479	16	28‍–‍19	18‍–‍31
Detroit Wolverines	40	58	.408	23	23‍–‍26	17‍–‍32
Philadelphia Quakers	17	81	.173	46	9‍–‍40	8‍–‍41

=== Record vs. opponents ===
1883 National League record Sources:
Team	BSN	BUF	CHI	CLE	DET	NYG	PHI	PRO
Boston	—	7–7	7–7	10–4	10–4	7–7	14–0	8–6
Buffalo	7–7	—	5–9	7–7	9–5–1	8–5	9–5	7–7
Chicago	7–7	9–5	—	6–8	9–5	9–5	12–2	7–7
Cleveland	4–10	7–7	8–6	—	9–5–1	7–6–2	12–2	8–6
Detroit	4–10	5–9–1	5–9	5–9–1	—	8–6	11–3–1	2–12
New York	7–7	5–8	5–9	6–7–2	6–8	—	12–2	5–9
Philadelphia	0–14	5–9	2–12	2–12	3–11–1	2–12	—	3–11
Providence	6–8	7–7	7–7	6–8	12–2	9–5	11–3	—

=== Roster ===
1883 New York Gothams
Roster
Pitchers: Myron Allen; Tip O'Neill; Mickey Welch	Catchers: John Clapp; Buck Ewing; John Humphries; Infielders: Ed Caskin; Roger Connor; Frank Hankinson; Dasher Troy	Outfielders: Dick Cramer; Mike Dorgan; Patrick Gillespie; Dave Orr; Gracie Pierce; John Ward	Manager: John Clapp

== Player stats ==
=== Batting ===
==== Starters by position ====
Note: Pos = Position; G = Games played; AB = At bats; H = Hits; Avg. = Batting average; HR = Home runs; RBI = Runs batted in

Pos	Player	G	AB	H	Avg.	HR	RBI
C	Buck Ewing	88	376	114	.303	10	41
1B	Roger Connor	98	409	146	.357	1	50
2B	Dasher Troy	85	316	68	.215	0	20
3B	Frank Hankinson	94	337	74	.220	2	30
SS	Ed Caskin	95	383	91	.238	1	40
OF	Mike Dorgan	64	261	61	.234	0	27
OF	Patrick Gillespie	98	411	129	.314	1	62
OF	John Ward	88	380	97	.255	7	54

==== Other batters ====
Note: G = Games played; AB = At bats; H = Hits; Avg. = Batting average; HR = Home runs; RBI = Runs batted in

Player	G	AB	H	Avg.	HR	RBI
John Humphries	29	107	12	.112	0	4
John Clapp	20	73	13	.178	0	5
Gracie Pierce	18	62	5	.081	0	2
Dick Cramer	2	6	0	.000	0	0
Dave Orr	1	3	0	.000	0	0

=== Pitching ===
==== Starting pitchers ====
Note: G = Games pitched; IP = Innings pitched; W = Wins; L = Losses; ERA = Earned run average; SO = Strikeouts

Player	G	IP	W	L	ERA	SO
Mickey Welch	52	426.0	25	23	2.73	144
John Ward	34	277.0	16	13	2.70	121
Tip O'Neill	19	148.0	5	12	4.07	55
Myron Allen	1	8.0	0	1	1.12	0
Mike Dorgan	1	7.0	0	1	3.86	3
