= List of National League pennant winners =

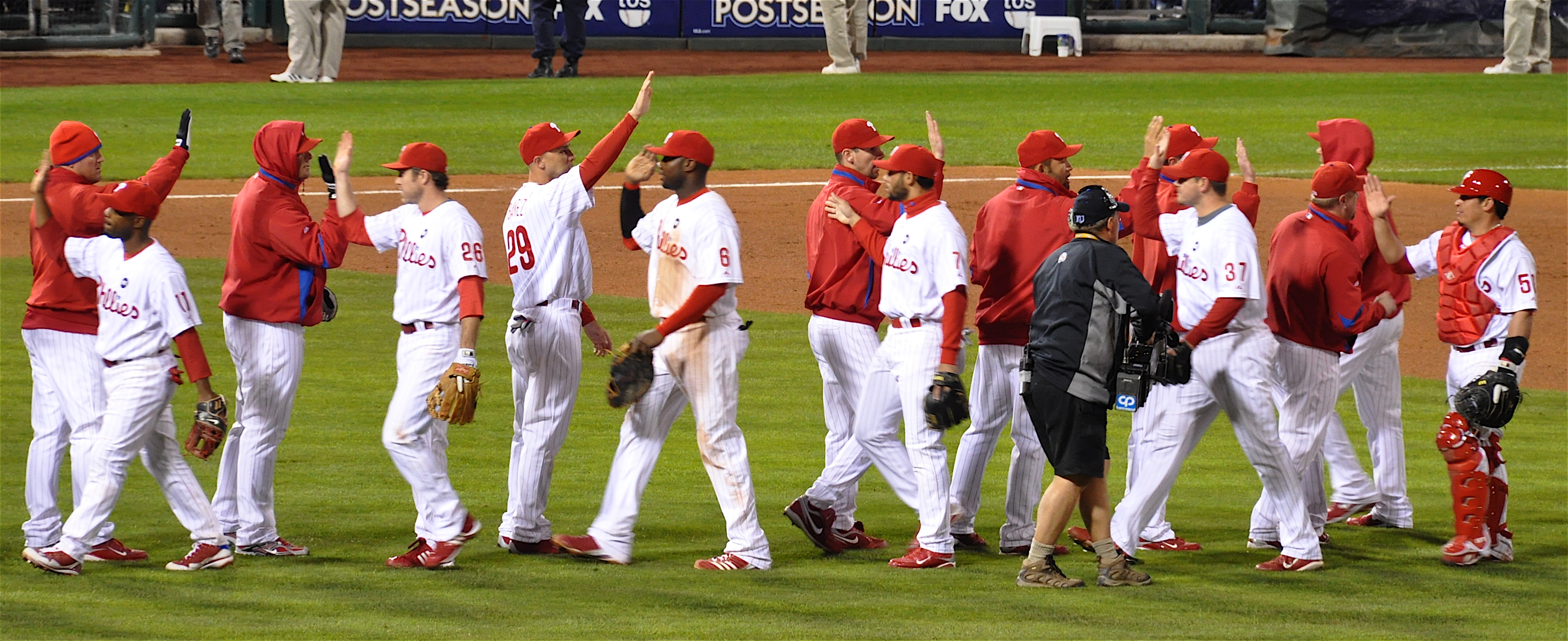
The Philadelphia Phillies won their second consecutive pennant in 2009 and lost to the San Francisco Giants in the 2010 NLCS.

The National League pennant winner of a given Major League Baseball season is the team that wins the championship—the pennant—of MLB's National League (NL). This team receives the Warren C. Giles Trophy and the right to play in the World Series against the champion of the American League (AL). The current NL pennant winners are the Milwaukee Brewers, who beat out the Los Angeles Dodgers to win the NL pennant in October 2026.

The trophy is named for Warren Giles, the league president from 1951 to 1969, and is presented immediately after each NL Championship Series (NLCS) by Warren's son Bill Giles, the honorary league president and former owner of the Philadelphia Phillies.

From 1876 through 1968, the pennant was awarded to the team with the best regular-season record. Beginning in 1969, the league was divided into East and West divisions, with the champions of each playing for the pennant in the League Championship Series (NLCS). Since 1995, there have been three divisions and a two-round playoff bracket which begins with two Division Series (NLDS).

The pennant has been awarded every year since 1876, except for 1994, when a players' strike forced the cancellation of the postseason. Until 1969, the pennant was presented to the team with the best win–loss record at the end of the season. In 1969, the league split into two divisions, and the teams with the best records in each division played one another in the NLCS to determine the pennant winner. The format of the NLCS was changed from a best-of-five to a best-of-seven format for the 1985 postseason. In 1995, an additional playoff series was added when MLB restructured the two divisions in each league into three. As of 2010, the winners of the Eastern, Central, and Western Divisions, as well as one wild card team, play in the NL Division Series, a best-of-five playoff to determine the opponents who will play for the pennant.

By pennants, the Los Angeles Dodgers (formerly the Brooklyn Dodgers; 26 pennants, 39 playoff appearances) are the winningest team in NL history. The San Francisco Giants (formerly the New York Giants; 23 pennants, 27 playoff appearances) are in second place, with the St. Louis Cardinals (19 pennants and 28 playoff appearances), in third place, followed by the Atlanta Braves (18 pennants and 23 postseason appearances between their three home cities of Atlanta, Milwaukee, and Boston) in fourth place and the Chicago Cubs (17 pennants and 20 playoff appearances as the Cubs and White Stockings) in fifth. The Philadelphia Phillies were NL champions in back-to-back seasons in 2008 and 2009, becoming the first NL team to do so since the Braves in 1995 and 1996. The Dodgers were also league champions in back-to-back seasons in 2017 and 2018. The modern World Series began in 1903, when the National League recognized the upstart American League, founded in 1901. There was an earlier "World's Championship Series" played between the pennant winners of the NL and the American Association 1884–1890; from 1894 to 1897 the NL's first- and second-place teams played a postseason series for the Temple Cup, which was considered to be the league championship. As of 2021, the Dodgers have the most modern-era World Series appearances at 21, followed by the San Francisco Giants with 20.

The team with the best record to win the NL pennant was the 1906 Cubs, who won 116 of 152 games during that season and finished 20 games ahead of the New York Giants. The best record by a pennant winner in the Championship Series era is 108–54, which was achieved by the Cincinnati Reds in 1975 and the New York Mets in 1986; both of these teams went on to win the World Series.

NL champions have gone on to win the World Series 53 times, most recently in 2025. Pennant winners have also won the Temple Cup and the Chronicle-Telegraph Cup, two pre-World Series league championships, although second-place teams won three of the four Temple Cup meetings. The largest margin of victory for a pennant winner, before the league split into two divisions in 1969, is 27 1/2 games; the Pittsburgh Pirates led the Brooklyn Superbas (now the Dodgers) by that margin on the final day of the 1902 season.

== Key ==
Year	Links to the corresponding "year in baseball" (1876–1900) or "Major League Baseball season" (1901–present) article
Team	Links to the corresponding season in which each team played
Series	Links to the corresponding "National League Championship Series" article
Record	Regular season win–loss record
GA	Games ahead of the second-place team (pre-NLCS era)
Ref	Reference
	Won World Series (1884–1890, 1892)
	Won Temple Cup (1894–1897)
	Won Chronicle-Telegraph Cup (1900)
	Won World Series (1903–present)
E	National League East division member (1969–present)
C	National League Central division member (1995–present)
W	National League West division member (1969–present)
†	Wild card team (1995–present)

== Single table era (1876–1968) ==
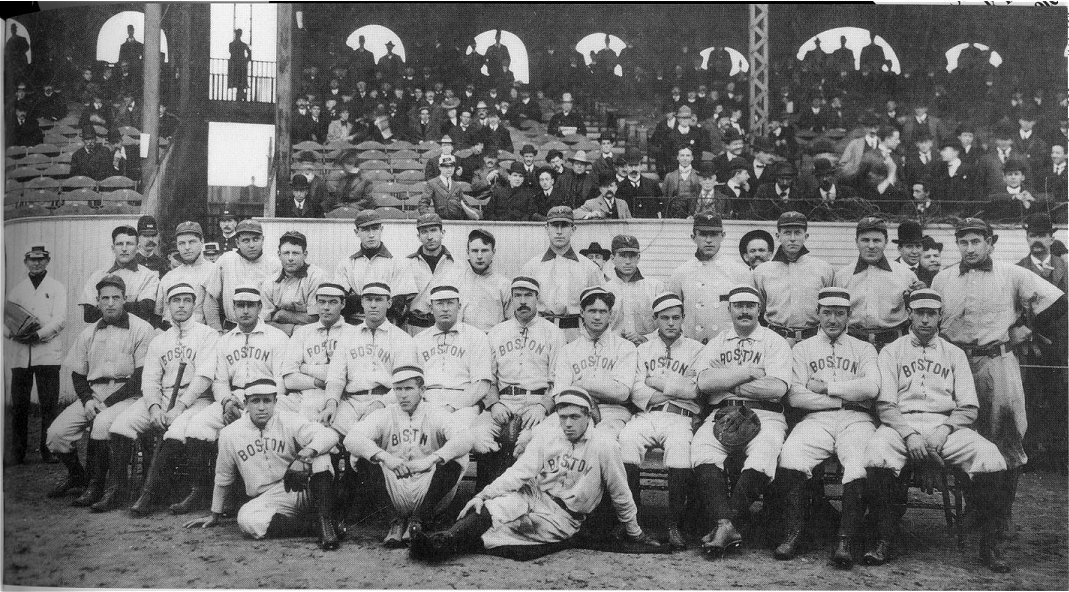
The Pittsburgh Pirates (back row) won the National League pennant in 1903, and played in the first modern World Series in baseball history.

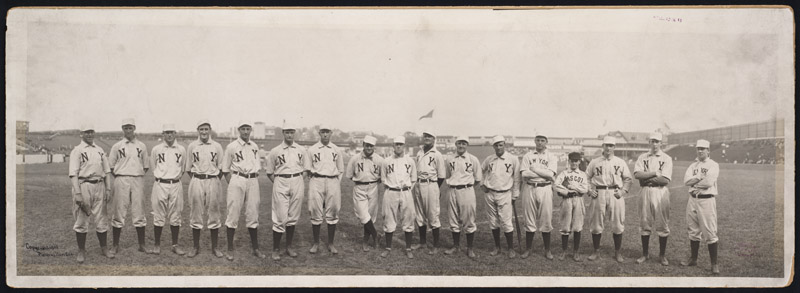
The New York Giants won their first World Series appearance in 1905 after their owner refused to take part in the 1904 World Series.

Year	Team	Manager	Record	GA	Ahead of	Manager	Ref
1876	Chicago White Stockings	Albert Spalding	52–14	6	St. Louis Brown Stockings	George McManus	
1877	Boston Red Caps	Harry Wright	42–18	7	Louisville Grays	Jack Chapman	
1878	Boston Red Caps	Harry Wright	41–19	4	Cincinnati Reds	Jack Chapman	
1879	Providence Grays	George Wright	59–25	5	Boston Red Caps	Cal McVey	
1880	Chicago White Stockings	Cap Anson	67–17	15	Providence Grays	Mike Dorgan	
1881	Chicago White Stockings	Cap Anson	56–28	9	Providence Grays	Tom York	
1882	Chicago White Stockings	Cap Anson	55–29	3	Providence Grays	Harry Wright	
1883	Boston Beaneaters	John Morrill	63–35	4	Chicago White Stockings	Cap Anson	
1884	Providence Grays	Frank Bancroft	84–28	10 1/2	Boston Beaneaters	John Morrill	
1885	Chicago White Stockings	Cap Anson	87–25	2	New York Giants	Jim Mutrie	
1886	Chicago White Stockings	Cap Anson	90–34	2 1/2	Detroit Wolverines	Bill Watkins	
1887	Detroit Wolverines	Bill Watkins	79–45	3 1/2	Philadelphia Quakers	Harry Wright	
1888	New York Giants	Jim Mutrie	84–47	9	Chicago White Stockings	Cap Anson	
1889	New York Giants	Jim Mutrie	83–43	1	Boston Beaneaters	Jim Hart	
1890	Brooklyn Bridegrooms	Bill McGunnigle	86–43	6 1/2	Chicago Colts	Cap Anson	
1891	Boston Beaneaters	Frank Selee	87–51	3 1/2	Chicago Colts	Cap Anson	
1892	Boston Beaneaters	Frank Selee	102–48	8 1/2	Cleveland Spiders	Patsy Tebeau	
1893	Boston Beaneaters	Frank Selee	86–43	5	Pittsburgh Pirates	Al Buckenberger	
1894	Baltimore Orioles	Ned Hanlon	89–39	3	New York Giants	John Montgomery Ward	
1895	Baltimore Orioles	Ned Hanlon	87–43	3	Cleveland Spiders	Patsy Tebeau	
1896	Baltimore Orioles	Ned Hanlon	90–39	9 1/2	Cleveland Spiders	Patsy Tebeau	
1897	Boston Beaneaters	Frank Selee	93–39	2	Baltimore Orioles	Ned Hanlon	
1898	Boston Beaneaters	Frank Selee	102–47	6	Baltimore Orioles	Ned Hanlon	
1899	Brooklyn Superbas	Ned Hanlon	101–47	8	Boston Beaneaters	Frank Selee	
1900	Brooklyn Superbas	Ned Hanlon	82–54	4 1/2	Pittsburgh Pirates	Fred Clarke	
1901	Pittsburgh Pirates	Fred Clarke	90–49	7 1/2	Philadelphia Phillies	Bill Shettsline	
1902	Pittsburgh Pirates	Fred Clarke	103–36	27 1/2	Brooklyn Superbas	Ned Hanlon	
1903	Pittsburgh Pirates	Fred Clarke	91–49	6 1/2	New York Giants	John McGraw	
1904	New York Giants	John McGraw	106–47	13	Chicago Cubs	Frank Selee	
1905	New York Giants	John McGraw	106–47	9	Pittsburgh Pirates	Fred Clarke	
1906	Chicago Cubs	Frank Chance	116–36	20	New York Giants	John McGraw	
1907	Chicago Cubs	Frank Chance	107–45	17	Pittsburgh Pirates	Fred Clarke	
1908	Chicago Cubs	Frank Chance	99–55	1	Pittsburgh Pirates	Fred Clarke	
1909	Pittsburgh Pirates	Fred Clarke	110–42	6 1/2	Chicago Cubs	Frank Chance	
1910	Chicago Cubs	Frank Chance	104–50	13	New York Giants	John McGraw	
1911	New York Giants	John McGraw	99–54	7 1/2	Chicago Cubs	Frank Chance	
1912	New York Giants	John McGraw	103–48	10	Pittsburgh Pirates	Fred Clarke	
1913	New York Giants	John McGraw	101–51	12 1/2	Philadelphia Phillies	Red Dooin	
1914	Boston Braves	George Stallings	94–59	10 1/2	New York Giants	John McGraw	
1915	Philadelphia Phillies	Pat Moran	90–62	7	Boston Braves	George Stallings	
1916	Brooklyn Robins	Wilbert Robinson	94–60	2 1/2	Philadelphia Phillies	Pat Moran	
1917	New York Giants	John McGraw	98–56	10	Philadelphia Phillies	Pat Moran	
1918	Chicago Cubs	Fred Mitchell	84–45	10 1/2	New York Giants	John McGraw	
1919	Cincinnati Reds	Pat Moran	96–44	9	New York Giants	John McGraw	
1920	Brooklyn Robins	Wilbert Robinson	93–61	7	New York Giants	George Gibson	
1921	New York Giants	John McGraw	94–59	4	Pittsburgh Pirates	George Gibson	
1922	New York Giants	John McGraw	93–61	7	Cincinnati Reds	Pat Moran	
1923	New York Giants	John McGraw	95–58	4 1/2	Cincinnati Reds	Pat Moran	
1924	New York Giants	John McGraw	93–60	1 1/2	Brooklyn Robins	Wilbert Robinson	
1925	Pittsburgh Pirates	Bill McKechnie	95–58	8 1/2	New York Giants	John McGraw	
1926	St. Louis Cardinals	Rogers Hornsby	89–65	2	Cincinnati Reds	Jack Hendricks	
1927	Pittsburgh Pirates	Donie Bush	94–60	1 1/2	St. Louis Cardinals	Bob O'Farrell	
1928	St. Louis Cardinals	Bill McKechnie	95–59	2	New York Giants	John McGraw	
1929	Chicago Cubs	Joe McCarthy	98–54	2	Pittsburgh Pirates	Jewel Ens	
1930	St. Louis Cardinals	Gabby Street	92–62	2	Chicago Cubs	Rogers Hornsby	
1931	St. Louis Cardinals	Gabby Street	101–53	13	New York Giants	John McGraw	
1932	Chicago Cubs	Charlie Grimm	90–64	4	Pittsburgh Pirates	George Gibson	
1933	New York Giants	Bill Terry	91–61	5	Pittsburgh Pirates	George Gibson	
1934	St. Louis Cardinals	Frankie Frisch	95–58	2	New York Giants	Bill Terry	
1935	Chicago Cubs	Charlie Grimm	100–54	4	St. Louis Cardinals	Frankie Frisch	
1936	New York Giants	Bill Terry	92–62	5	St. Louis Cardinals	Frankie Frisch	
1937	New York Giants	Bill Terry	95–57	3	Chicago Cubs	Charlie Grimm	
1938	Chicago Cubs	Charlie Grimm	89–63	2	Pittsburgh Pirates	Pie Traynor	
1939	Cincinnati Reds	Bill McKechnie	97–57	4 1/2	St. Louis Cardinals	Ray Blades	
1940	Cincinnati Reds	Bill McKechnie	100–53	12	Brooklyn Dodgers	Leo Durocher	
1941	Brooklyn Dodgers	Leo Durocher	100–54	2 1/2	St. Louis Cardinals	Billy Southworth	
1942	St. Louis Cardinals	Billy Southworth	106–48	2	Brooklyn Dodgers	Leo Durocher	
1943	St. Louis Cardinals	Billy Southworth	105–49	18	Cincinnati Reds	Bill McKechnie	
1944	St. Louis Cardinals	Billy Southworth	105–49	14 1/2	Pittsburgh Pirates	Frankie Frisch	
1945	Chicago Cubs	Charlie Grimm	98–56	3	St. Louis Cardinals	Billy Southworth	
1946	St. Louis Cardinals	Eddie Dyer	98–58	2	Brooklyn Dodgers	Leo Durocher	
1947	Brooklyn Dodgers	Burt Shotton	94–60	5	St. Louis Cardinals	Eddie Dyer	
1948	Boston Braves	Billy Southworth	91–62	6 1/2	St. Louis Cardinals	Eddie Dyer	
1949	Brooklyn Dodgers	Burt Shotton	97–57	1	St. Louis Cardinals	Eddie Dyer	
1950	Philadelphia Phillies	Eddie Sawyer	91–63	2	Brooklyn Dodgers	Burt Shotton	
1951	New York Giants	Leo Durocher	98–59	1	Brooklyn Dodgers	Chuck Dressen	
1952	Brooklyn Dodgers	Chuck Dressen	96–57	4 1/2	New York Giants	Leo Durocher	
1953	Brooklyn Dodgers	Chuck Dressen	105–49	13	Milwaukee Braves	Charlie Grimm	
1954	New York Giants	Leo Durocher	97–57	5	Brooklyn Dodgers	Walter Alston	
1955	Brooklyn Dodgers	Walter Alston	98–55	13 1/2	Milwaukee Braves	Charlie Grimm	
1956	Brooklyn Dodgers	Walter Alston	93–61	1	Milwaukee Braves	Fred Haney	
1957	Milwaukee Braves	Fred Haney	95–59	8	St. Louis Cardinals	Fred Hutchinson	
1958	Milwaukee Braves	Fred Haney	92–62	8	Pittsburgh Pirates	Danny Murtaugh	
1959	Los Angeles Dodgers	Walter Alston	88–68	2	Milwaukee Braves	Fred Haney	
1960	Pittsburgh Pirates	Danny Murtaugh	95–59	7	Milwaukee Braves	Chuck Dressen	
1961	Cincinnati Reds	Fred Hutchinson	93–61	4	Los Angeles Dodgers	Walter Alston	
1962	San Francisco Giants	Alvin Dark	103–62	1	Los Angeles Dodgers	Walter Alston	
1963	Los Angeles Dodgers	Walter Alston	99–63	6	St. Louis Cardinals	Johnny Keane	
1964	St. Louis Cardinals	Johnny Keane	93–69	1	Philadelphia Phillies	Gene Mauch	
1965	Los Angeles Dodgers	Walter Alston	97–65	2	San Francisco Giants	Herman Franks	
1966	Los Angeles Dodgers	Walter Alston	95–67	1 1/2	San Francisco Giants	Herman Franks	
1967	St. Louis Cardinals	Red Schoendienst	101–60	10 1/2	San Francisco Giants	Herman Franks	
1968	St. Louis Cardinals	Red Schoendienst	97–65	9	San Francisco Giants	Herman Franks	

== League Championship Series era (1969–present) ==
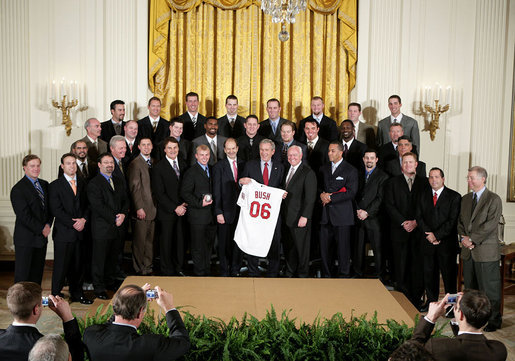
The 2006 St. Louis Cardinals won the World Series after capturing the National League pennant.

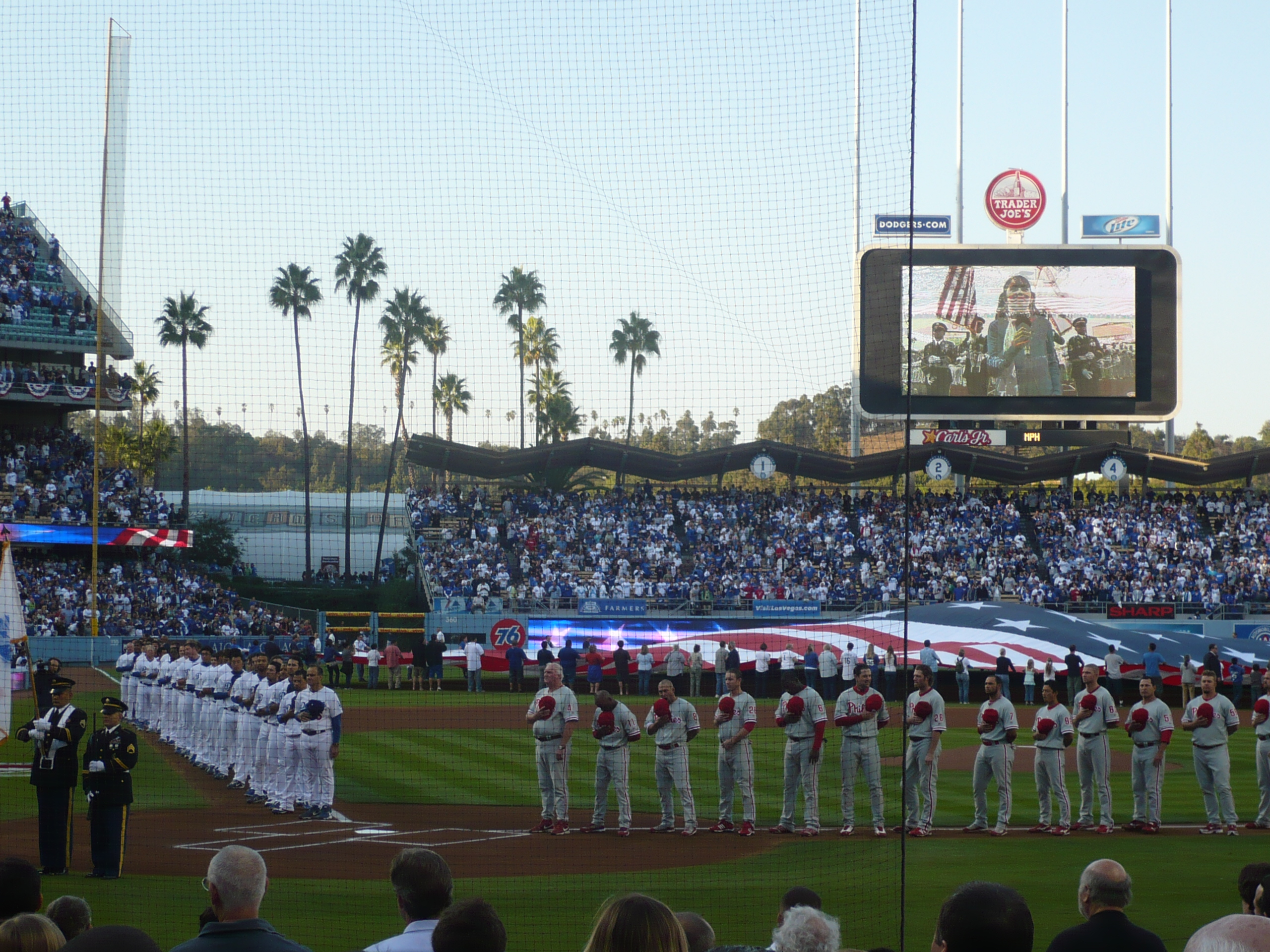
In 2008, the Philadelphia Phillies and the Los Angeles Dodgers faced off in the National League championship series for the pennant; the Phillies won, four games to one.

Year	Series	Winning team	Record	Games	Losing team	Record	Ref
1969	1969	New York Mets^{E}	100–62	3–0	Atlanta Braves^{W}	93–69	
1970	1970	Cincinnati Reds^{W}	102–60	3–0	Pittsburgh Pirates^{E}	87–63	
1971	1971	Pittsburgh Pirates^{E}	97–65	3–1	San Francisco Giants^{W}	90–72	
1972	1972	Cincinnati Reds^{W}	95–59	3–2	Pittsburgh Pirates^{E}	96–59	
1973	1973	New York Mets^{E}	82–79	3–2	Cincinnati Reds^{W}	99–63	
1974	1974	Los Angeles Dodgers^{W}	102–60	3–1	Pittsburgh Pirates^{E}	88–74	
1975	1975	Cincinnati Reds^{W}	108–54	3–0	Pittsburgh Pirates^{E}	92–69	
1976	1976	Cincinnati Reds^{W}	102–60	3–0	Philadelphia Phillies^{E}	101–61	
1977	1977	Los Angeles Dodgers^{W}	98–64	3–1	Philadelphia Phillies^{E}	101–61	
1978	1978	Los Angeles Dodgers^{W}	95–67	3–1	Philadelphia Phillies^{E}	90–72	
1979	1979	Pittsburgh Pirates^{E}	98–64	3–0	Cincinnati Reds^{W}	90–71	
1980	1980	Philadelphia Phillies^{E}	91–71	3–2	Houston Astros^{W}	93–70	
1981^{[a]}	1981	Los Angeles Dodgers^{W}	63–47	3–2	Montréal Expos^{E}	60–48	
1982	1982	St. Louis Cardinals^{E}	92–70	3–0	Atlanta Braves^{W}	89–73	
1983	1983	Philadelphia Phillies^{E}	90–72	3–1	Los Angeles Dodgers^{W}	91–71	
1984	1984	San Diego Padres^{W}	92–70	3–2	Chicago Cubs^{E}	96–65	
1985	1985	St. Louis Cardinals^{E}	101–61	4–2	Los Angeles Dodgers^{W}	95–67	
1986	1986	New York Mets^{E}	108–54	4–2	Houston Astros^{W}	96–66	
1987	1987	St. Louis Cardinals^{E}	95–67	4–3	San Francisco Giants	90–72	
1988	1988	Los Angeles Dodgers^{W}	94–67	4–3	New York Mets^{E}	100–60	
1989	1989	San Francisco Giants^{W}	92–70	4–1	Chicago Cubs^{E}	93–69	
1990	1990	Cincinnati Reds^{W}	91–71	4–2	Pittsburgh Pirates^{E}	95–67	
1991	1991	Atlanta Braves^{W}	94–68	4–3	Pittsburgh Pirates^{E}	98–64	
1992	1992	Atlanta Braves^{W}	98–64	4–3	Pittsburgh Pirates^{E}	96–66	
1993	1993	Philadelphia Phillies^{E}	97–65	4–2	Atlanta Braves^{W}	104–58	
1994	Not held due to players' strike.						
1995^{[b]}	1995	Atlanta Braves^{E}	90–54	4–0	Cincinnati Reds^{C}	85–59	
1996	1996	Atlanta Braves^{E}	96–66	4–3	St. Louis Cardinals^{C}	88–74	
1997	1997	Florida Marlins^{E†}	92–70	4–2	Atlanta Braves^{E}	101–61	
1998	1998	San Diego Padres^{W}	98–64	4–2	Atlanta Braves^{E}	106–56	
1999	1999	Atlanta Braves^{E}	103–59	4–2	New York Mets^{E†}	97–66	
2000	2000	New York Mets^{E†}	94–68	4–1	St. Louis Cardinals^{C}	95–67	
2001	2001	Arizona Diamondbacks^{W}	92–70	4–1	Atlanta Braves^{E}	88–74	
2002	2002	San Francisco Giants^{W†}	95–66	4–1	St. Louis Cardinals^{C}	97–65	
2003	2003	Florida Marlins^{E†}	91–71	4–3	Chicago Cubs^{C}	88–74	
2004	2004	St. Louis Cardinals^{C}	105–57	4–3	Houston Astros^{C†}	92–70	
2005	2005	Houston Astros^{C†}	89–73	4–2	St. Louis Cardinals^{C}	100–62	
2006	2006	St. Louis Cardinals^{C}	83–78	4–3	New York Mets^{E}	97–65	
2007	2007	Colorado Rockies^{W†}	90–73	4–0	Arizona Diamondbacks^{W}	90–72	
2008	2008	Philadelphia Phillies^{E}	92–70	4–1	Los Angeles Dodgers^{W}	84–78	
2009	2009	Philadelphia Phillies^{E}	93–69	4–1	Los Angeles Dodgers^{W}	95–67	
2010	2010	San Francisco Giants^{W}	92–70	4–2	Philadelphia Phillies^{E}	97–65	
2011	2011	St. Louis Cardinals^{C†}	90–72	4–2	Milwaukee Brewers^{C}	96–66	
2012	2012	San Francisco Giants^{W}	94–68	4–3	St. Louis Cardinals^{C†}	88–74	
2013	2013	St. Louis Cardinals^{C}	97–65	4–2	Los Angeles Dodgers^{W}	92–70	
2014	2014	San Francisco Giants^{W†}	88–74	4–1	St. Louis Cardinals^{C}	90–72	
2015	2015	New York Mets^{E}	90–72	4–0	Chicago Cubs^{C†}	97–65	
2016	2016	Chicago Cubs^{C}	103–58	4–2	Los Angeles Dodgers^{W}	91–71	
2017	2017	Los Angeles Dodgers^{W}	104–58	4–1	Chicago Cubs^{C}	92–70	
2018	2018	Los Angeles Dodgers^{W}	92–71	4–3	Milwaukee Brewers^{C}	96–67	
2019	2019	Washington Nationals^{E†}	93–69	4–0	St. Louis Cardinals^{C}	91–71	
2020	2020	Los Angeles Dodgers^{W}	43–17	4–3	Atlanta Braves^{E}	35–25	
2021	2021	Atlanta Braves^{E}	88–73	4–2	Los Angeles Dodgers^{W†}	106–56	
2022	2022	Philadelphia Phillies^{E†}	87–75	4–1	San Diego Padres^{W†}	89–73	
2023	2023	Arizona Diamondbacks^{W†}	84–78	4–3	Philadelphia Phillies^{E†}	90–72	
2024	2024	Los Angeles Dodgers^{W}	98–64	4–2	New York Mets^{E†}	89–73	
2025	2025	Los Angeles Dodgers^{W}	93–69	4–0	Milwaukee Brewers^{C}	97–65	
2026	2026	Milwaukee Brewers^{C}	103–59	4–0	Los Angeles Dodgers^{W}	100–62	

=== Notes ===
- ^{a} A mid-season labor stoppage split the season into two halves. The winner of the first half played the winner of the second half in each division in the 1981 National League Division Series. The winners played in the 1981 NLCS for the National League pennant.
- ^{b} The leagues were re-aligned in 1994 to three divisions and a wild card was added to the playoffs, but the labor stoppage cancelled the postseason. Wild cards were first used in the 1995 playoffs.

== NL pennants won by franchise ==
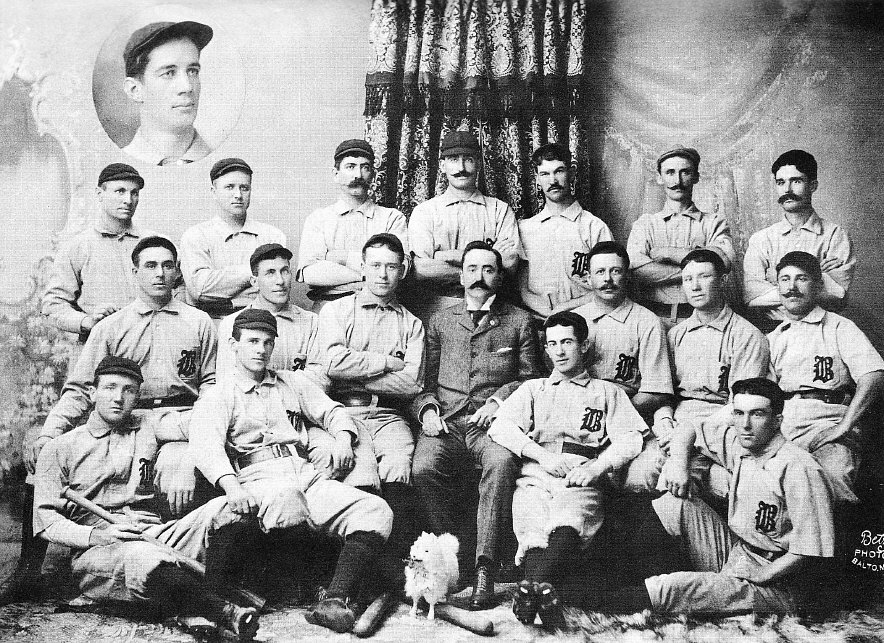
The 19th century Baltimore Orioles team won three National League pennants, one of three defunct teams to have won the league.

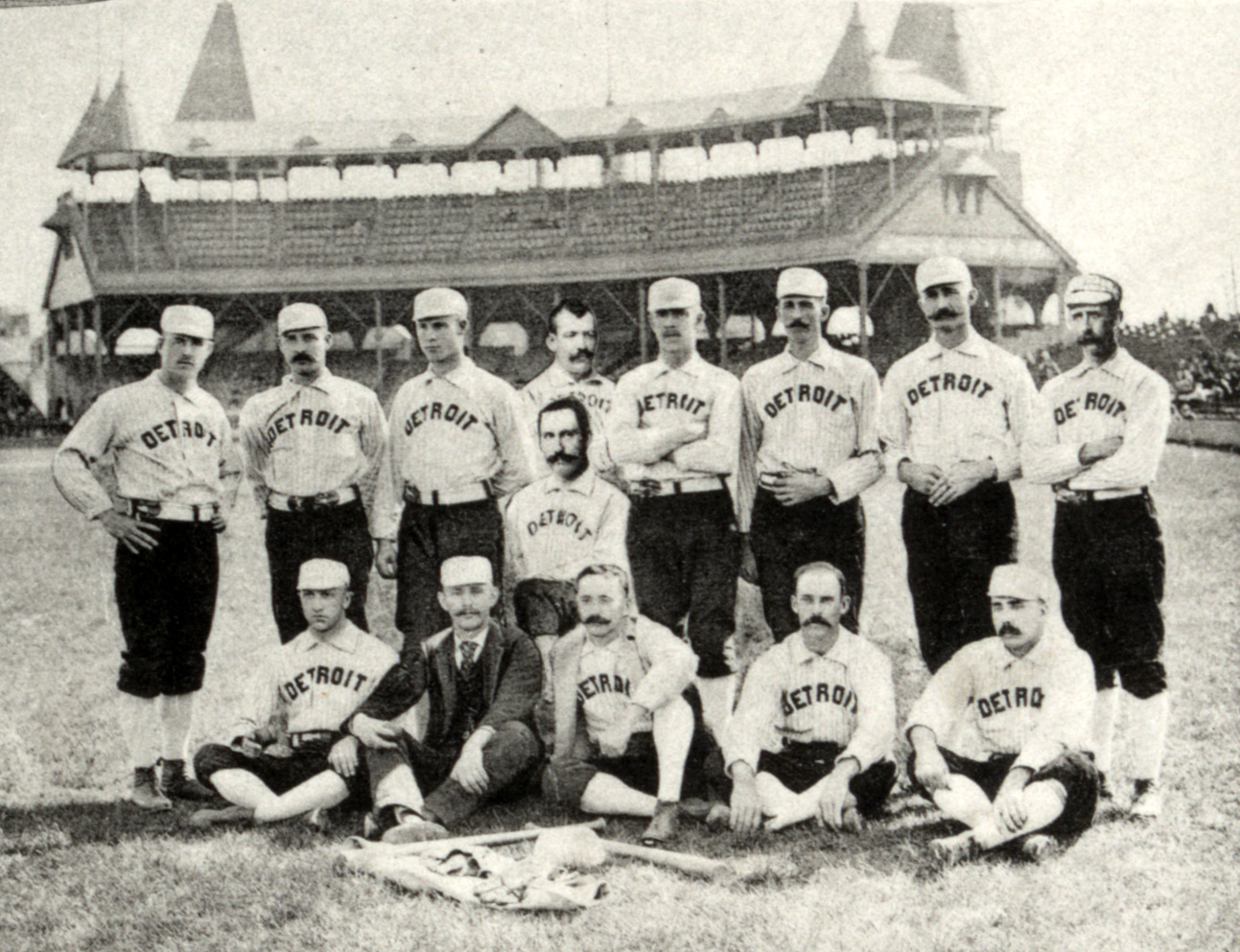
The Detroit Wolverines won their only pennant in 1887, followed by a victory in the World's Championship Series.

Italics represent a franchise that is defunct in Major League Baseball as of the 2023 season.

Team	Pennants won	Postseason appearances	Ref
Los Angeles Dodgers^{[a]}	26	39	
San Francisco Giants^{[b]}	23	27	
St. Louis Cardinals^{[c]}	19	32	
Atlanta Braves^{[d]}	18	30	
Chicago Cubs^{[e]}	17	22	
Pittsburgh Pirates^{[f]}	9	17	
Cincinnati Reds^{[g]}	9	16	
Philadelphia Phillies^{[h]}	8	18	
New York Mets	5	11	
Baltimore Orioles (NL)^{[i]}	3	–	
San Diego Padres	2	9	
Arizona Diamondbacks	2	7	
Miami Marlins	2	4	
Providence Grays	2	–	
Houston Astros^{[j]}	1	9	
Milwaukee Brewers^{[l]}	1	9	
Washington Nationals^{[k]}	1	6	
Colorado Rockies	1	5	
Detroit Wolverines	1	–	

=== Notes ===
- ^{a} Previously known as Brooklyn Dodgers, Brooklyn Robins, Brooklyn Superbas, Brooklyn Bridegrooms, Brooklyn Grooms, Brooklyn Grays and Brooklyn Atlantics. Does not include American Association pennant won in 1889
- ^{b} Previously known as New York Giants and New York Gothams
- ^{c} Previously known as St. Louis Perfectos, St. Louis Browns, and St. Louis Brown Stockings. Does not include four American Association pennants won in 1885–1888
- ^{d} Previously known as Milwaukee Braves, Boston Braves, Boston Bees, Boston Rustlers, Boston Doves, Boston Beaneaters and Boston Red Caps
- ^{e} Previously known as Chicago Orphans, Chicago Colts and Chicago White Stockings
- ^{f} Previously known as Pittsburgh Alleghenys
- ^{g} Previously known as Cincinnati Redlegs and Cincinnati Red Stockings. Does not include American Association pennant won in 1882
- ^{h} Previously known as Philadelphia Quakers and unofficially as Philadelphia Blue Jays
- ^{i} The 19th-century Baltimore Orioles who played in the National League are no longer in existence; two current American League franchises later used the Orioles name (New York Yankees and Baltimore Orioles).
- ^{j} Previously known as Houston Colt .45s. Does not include four American League pennants.
- ^{k} Previously known as Montreal Expos. In 1994, the Expos led the National League East and had the best win–loss record in the league when the season was cut short by a labor dispute.
- ^{l} The Brewers were members of the American League through the 1997 season after which they switched to the National League. This table records only the Brewers' National League accomplishments. They won the American League pennant in 1982.

== See also ==
- American League Championship Series – the American League counterpart to the NLCS
  - List of American League pennant winners
- National League Division Series – has preceded this series since 1994
