= Richard Kramer =

Richard Kramer or Cramer may refer to:

- Richard Kramer (judge) (born 1947), American superior court judge
- Richard Kramer (writer) (born 1952), American screenwriter, novelist and television producer
- Richard J. Kramer (born 1963), American businessman
- Richard Cramer (1889–1960), actor
- Richard Ben Cramer (1950–2013), American journalist and writer

== See also ==
- Dick Cramer, American baseball player
- Rick Cramer, American golfer
