= National League champions =

National League champions may refer to:

- List of National League pennant winners, in Major League Baseball
- National League (division) § Past winners, in the National League System of English football
