= 1883 Cleveland Blues season =

1883 Cleveland Blues
- League: National League
- Ballpark: Kennard Street Park
- City: Cleveland, Ohio
- Record: 55–42 (.567)
- League place: 4th
- Manager: Frank Bancroft

The 1883 Cleveland Blues finished the season at 55–42, fourth place in the National League.

== Regular season ==
=== Season standings ===
National League
| Team | W | L | Pct. | GB | Home | Road |
|---|---|---|---|---|---|---|
| Boston Beaneaters | 63 | 35 | .643 | — | 41‍–‍8 | 22‍–‍27 |
| Chicago White Stockings | 59 | 39 | .602 | 4 | 36‍–‍13 | 23‍–‍26 |
| Providence Grays | 58 | 40 | .592 | 5 | 34‍–‍15 | 24‍–‍25 |
| Cleveland Blues | 55 | 42 | .567 | 7½ | 31‍–‍18 | 24‍–‍24 |
| Buffalo Bisons | 49 | 45 | .521 | 12 | 36‍–‍13 | 13‍–‍32 |
| New York Gothams | 46 | 50 | .479 | 16 | 28‍–‍19 | 18‍–‍31 |
| Detroit Wolverines | 40 | 58 | .408 | 23 | 23‍–‍26 | 17‍–‍32 |
| Philadelphia Quakers | 17 | 81 | .173 | 46 | 9‍–‍40 | 8‍–‍41 |

=== Record vs. opponents ===
1883 National League record Sources:
| Team | BSN | BUF | CHI | CLE | DET | NYG | PHI | PRO |
|---|---|---|---|---|---|---|---|---|
| Boston | — | 7–7 | 7–7 | 10–4 | 10–4 | 7–7 | 14–0 | 8–6 |
| Buffalo | 7–7 | — | 5–9 | 7–7 | 9–5–1 | 8–5 | 9–5 | 7–7 |
| Chicago | 7–7 | 9–5 | — | 6–8 | 9–5 | 9–5 | 12–2 | 7–7 |
| Cleveland | 4–10 | 7–7 | 8–6 | — | 9–5–1 | 7–6–2 | 12–2 | 8–6 |
| Detroit | 4–10 | 5–9–1 | 5–9 | 5–9–1 | — | 8–6 | 11–3–1 | 2–12 |
| New York | 7–7 | 5–8 | 5–9 | 6–7–2 | 6–8 | — | 12–2 | 5–9 |
| Philadelphia | 0–14 | 5–9 | 2–12 | 2–12 | 3–11–1 | 2–12 | — | 3–11 |
| Providence | 6–8 | 7–7 | 7–7 | 6–8 | 12–2 | 9–5 | 11–3 | — |

=== Roster ===
1883 Cleveland Blues
Roster
| Pitchers: Hugh Daily; Jim McCormick; Will Sawyer; Catchers: Fatty Briody; Cal Broughton; Doc Bushong | Infielders: George Bradley; Fred Dunlap; Jack Glasscock; Mike Muldoon; Bill Phillips | Outfielders: Charlie Cady; Bill Crowley; Jake Evans; Pete Hotaling; Lem Hunter; Tom York | Manager: Frank Bancroft |

== Player stats ==
=== Batting ===
==== Starters by position ====
Note: Pos = Position; G = Games played; AB = At bats; H = Hits; Avg. = Batting average; HR = Home runs; RBI = Runs batted in

| Pos | Player | G | AB | H | Avg. | HR | RBI |
|---|---|---|---|---|---|---|---|
| C | Doc Bushong | 63 | 215 | 37 | .172 | 0 | 9 |
| 1B | Bill Phillips | 97 | 382 | 94 | .246 | 2 | 40 |
| 2B | Fred Dunlap | 93 | 396 | 129 | .326 | 4 | 37 |
| 3B | Mike Muldoon | 98 | 378 | 86 | .228 | 0 | 29 |
| SS | Jack Glasscock | 96 | 383 | 110 | .287 | 0 | 46 |
| OF | Pete Hotaling | 100 | 417 | 108 | .259 | 0 | 30 |
| OF | Tom York | 100 | 381 | 99 | .260 | 2 | 46 |
| OF | Jake Evans | 90 | 332 | 79 | .238 | 0 | 31 |

==== Other batters ====
Note: G = Games played; AB = At bats; H = Hits; Avg. = Batting average; HR = Home runs; RBI = Runs batted in

| Player | G | AB | H | Avg. | HR | RBI |
|---|---|---|---|---|---|---|
| Fatty Briody | 40 | 145 | 34 | .234 | 0 | 10 |
| Bill Crowley | 11 | 41 | 12 | .293 | 0 | 5 |
| George Bradley | 4 | 16 | 5 | .313 | 0 | 1 |
| Charlie Cady | 3 | 11 | 0 | .000 | 0 | 0 |
| Cal Broughton | 4 | 10 | 2 | .200 | 0 | 1 |
| Lem Hunter | 1 | 4 | 1 | .250 | 0 | 0 |

=== Pitching ===
==== Starting pitchers ====
Note: G = Games pitched; IP = Innings pitched; W = Wins; L = Losses; ERA = Earned run average; SO = Strikeouts

| Player | G | IP | W | L | ERA | SO |
|---|---|---|---|---|---|---|
| Hugh Daily | 45 | 378.2 | 23 | 19 | 2.42 | 171 |
| Jim McCormick | 43 | 342.0 | 28 | 12 | 1.84 | 145 |
| Will Sawyer | 17 | 141.0 | 4 | 10 | 2.36 | 76 |
| Charlie Cady | 1 | 8.0 | 0 | 1 | 7.88 | 5 |

==== Relief pitchers ====
Note: G = Games pitched; W = Wins; L = Losses; SV = Saves; ERA = Earned run average; SO = Strikeouts

| Player | G | W | L | SV | ERA | SO |
|---|---|---|---|---|---|---|
| Lem Hunter | 1 | 0 | 0 | 0 | 1.42 | 4 |
| Jake Evans | 1 | 0 | 0 | 0 | 0.00 | 1 |
