= Radbourn =

Radbourn is a surname. Notable people with the surname include:

- Charles Radbourn (1854–1897), American baseball player
- George Radbourn (1856–1904), American baseball player

== See also ==
- Radbourne (disambiguation)
