= 1883 Buffalo Bisons season =

1883 Buffalo Bisons
- League: National League
- Ballpark: Riverside Park
- City: Buffalo, New York
- Record: 49–45 (.521)
- League place: 5th
- Manager: Jim O'Rourke

The 1883 Buffalo Bisons finished the season with a 52–45 record, good for fifth place in the National League. Star slugger Dan Brouthers won his second consecutive NL batting title with a .374 average and Pud Galvin posted 46 wins.

== Regular season ==
=== Season standings ===
National League
Team	W	L	Pct.	GB	Home	Road
Boston Beaneaters	63	35	.643	—	41‍–‍8	22‍–‍27
Chicago White Stockings	59	39	.602	4	36‍–‍13	23‍–‍26
Providence Grays	58	40	.592	5	34‍–‍15	24‍–‍25
Cleveland Blues	55	42	.567	7½	31‍–‍18	24‍–‍24
Buffalo Bisons	49	45	.521	12	36‍–‍13	13‍–‍32
New York Gothams	46	50	.479	16	28‍–‍19	18‍–‍31
Detroit Wolverines	40	58	.408	23	23‍–‍26	17‍–‍32
Philadelphia Quakers	17	81	.173	46	9‍–‍40	8‍–‍41

=== Record vs. opponents ===
1883 National League record Sources:
Team	BSN	BUF	CHI	CLE	DET	NYG	PHI	PRO
Boston	—	7–7	7–7	10–4	10–4	7–7	14–0	8–6
Buffalo	7–7	—	5–9	7–7	9–5–1	8–5	9–5	7–7
Chicago	7–7	9–5	—	6–8	9–5	9–5	12–2	7–7
Cleveland	4–10	7–7	8–6	—	9–5–1	7–6–2	12–2	8–6
Detroit	4–10	5–9–1	5–9	5–9–1	—	8–6	11–3–1	2–12
New York	7–7	5–8	5–9	6–7–2	6–8	—	12–2	5–9
Philadelphia	0–14	5–9	2–12	2–12	3–11–1	2–12	—	3–11
Providence	6–8	7–7	7–7	6–8	12–2	9–5	11–3	—

=== Roster ===
1883 Buffalo Bisons
Roster
Pitchers: James Burke; Ed Cushman; George Derby; Pud Galvin; Art Hagan	Catchers: Dell Darling; Jack Rowe; Infielders: Dan Brouthers; Davy Force; Hardy Richardson; Deacon White	Outfielders: Dave Eggler; Curry Foley; Doc Kennedy; Jim Lillie; Jim O'Rourke; Orator Shafer; Tony Suck	Manager: Jim O'Rourke

== Player stats ==
=== Batting ===
==== Starters by position ====
Note: Pos = Position; G = Games played; AB = At bats; H = Hits; Avg. = Batting average; HR = Home runs; RBI = Runs batted in

Pos	Player	G	AB	H	Avg.	HR	RBI
C	Jack Rowe	87	374	104	.278	1	38
1B	Dan Brouthers	98	425	159	.374	3	97
2B	Hardy Richardson	92	399	124	.311	1	56
3B	Deacon White	94	391	114	.292	0	47
SS	Davy Force	96	378	82	.217	0	35
OF	Orator Shafer	95	401	117	.292	0	41
OF	Jim O'Rourke	94	436	143	.328	1	38
OF	Jim Lillie	50	201	47	.234	1	29

==== Other batters ====
Note: G = Games played; AB = At bats; H = Hits; Avg. = Batting average; HR = Home runs; RBI = Runs batted in

Player	G	AB	H	Avg.	HR	RBI
Dave Eggler	38	153	38	.248	0	13
Curry Foley	23	111	30	.270	0	6
Doc Kennedy	5	19	6	.316	0	2
Dell Darling	6	18	3	.167	0	1
Tony Suck	2	7	0	.000	0	0
James Burke	1	5	1	.200	0	1

=== Pitching ===
==== Starting pitchers ====
Note: G = Games pitched; IP = Innings pitched; W = Wins; L = Losses; ERA = Earned run average; SO = Strikeouts

Player	G	IP	W	L	ERA	SO
Pud Galvin	76	656.1	46	29	2.72	279
George Derby	14	107.2	2	10	5.85	34
Ed Cushman	7	50.1	3	3	3.93	34
Art Hagan	2	15.0	0	2	3.60	7
James Burke	1	8.0	0	0	5.63	1

==== Relief pitchers ====
Note: G = Games pitched; W = Wins; L = Losses; SV = Saves; ERA = Earned run average; SO = Strikeouts

Player	G	W	L	SV	ERA	SO
Jim Lillie	3	0	1	0	3.00	4
Jim O'Rourke	2	0	0	1	6.43	1
Dan Brouthers	1	0	0	0	31.50	2
Curry Foley	1	1	0	0	0.00	0
