= Radbourne =

Radbourne may refer to:

- Radbourne, Derbyshire, a village and civil parish in England
  - Radbourne Hall, a country house
- Radbourne, Warwickshire, a civil parish near Ladbroke, Warwickshire, England
  - Upper and Lower Radbourne, a former civil parish in the defunct Southam Rural District

== See also ==
- Radbourn, a surname
- Rodbourne, a suburb of Swindon, Wiltshire, England
