= 1883 Boston Beaneaters season =

1883 Boston Beaneaters
- National League champions
- League: National League
- Ballpark: South End Grounds
- City: Boston, Massachusetts
- Record: 63–35 (.643)
- League place: 1st
- Owner: Arthur Soden
- Managers: Jack Burdock, John Morrill

The 1883 Boston Beaneaters season was the 13th season of the franchise. The Beaneaters won their third National League pennant, their third in six years. This is also generally recognized as the year during which the team's nickname became the Boston Beaneaters.

== Regular season ==
=== Season standings ===
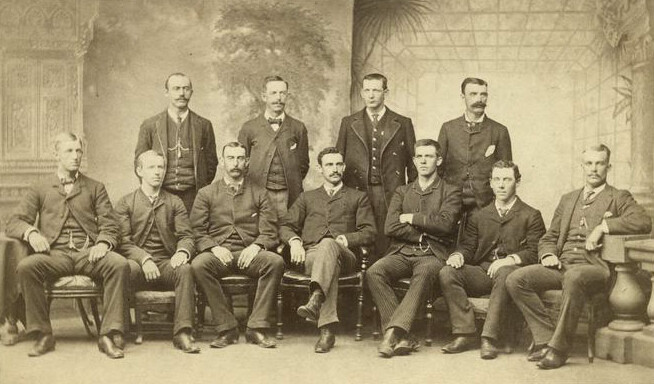
Team photograph of the 1883 Boston Beaneaters

National League
Team	W	L	Pct.	GB	Home	Road
Boston Beaneaters	63	35	.643	—	41‍–‍8	22‍–‍27
Chicago White Stockings	59	39	.602	4	36‍–‍13	23‍–‍26
Providence Grays	58	40	.592	5	34‍–‍15	24‍–‍25
Cleveland Blues	55	42	.567	7½	31‍–‍18	24‍–‍24
Buffalo Bisons	49	45	.521	12	36‍–‍13	13‍–‍32
New York Gothams	46	50	.479	16	28‍–‍19	18‍–‍31
Detroit Wolverines	40	58	.408	23	23‍–‍26	17‍–‍32
Philadelphia Quakers	17	81	.173	46	9‍–‍40	8‍–‍41

=== Record vs. opponents ===
1883 National League record Sources:
Team	BSN	BUF	CHI	CLE	DET	NYG	PHI	PRO
Boston	—	7–7	7–7	10–4	10–4	7–7	14–0	8–6
Buffalo	7–7	—	5–9	7–7	9–5–1	8–5	9–5	7–7
Chicago	7–7	9–5	—	6–8	9–5	9–5	12–2	7–7
Cleveland	4–10	7–7	8–6	—	9–5–1	7–6–2	12–2	8–6
Detroit	4–10	5–9–1	5–9	5–9–1	—	8–6	11–3–1	2–12
New York	7–7	5–8	5–9	6–7–2	6–8	—	12–2	5–9
Philadelphia	0–14	5–9	2–12	2–12	3–11–1	2–12	—	3–11
Providence	6–8	7–7	7–7	6–8	12–2	9–5	11–3	—

=== Roster ===
1883 Boston Beaneaters
Roster
Pitchers: Jim Whitney; Catchers: Mert Hackett; Mike Hines	Infielders: Lew Brown; Jack Burdock; John Morrill; Ezra Sutton; Sam Wise	Outfielders: Charlie Buffinton; Joe Hornung; Paul Radford; Edgar Smith	Manager: Jack Burdock; John Morrill

== Player stats ==
=== Batting ===
==== Starters by position ====
Note: Pos = Position; G = Games played; AB = At bats; H = Hits; Avg. = Batting average; HR = Home runs; RBI = Runs batted in

Pos	Player	G	AB	H	Avg.	HR	RBI
C	Mike Hines	63	231	52	.225	0	16
1B	John Morrill	97	402	129	.319	6	68
2B	Jack Burdock	96	400	132	.330	5	88
3B	Ezra Sutton	94	414	134	.324	3	73
SS	Sam Wise	96	406	110	.271	4	58
OF	Charlie Buffinton	86	341	81	.238	1	26
OF	Paul Radford	72	258	53	.205	0	14
OF	Joe Hornung	96	446	124	.278	8	66

==== Other batters ====
Note: G = Games played; AB = At bats; H = Hits; Avg. = Batting average; HR = Home runs; RBI = Runs batted in

Player	G	AB	H	Avg.	HR	RBI
Mert Hackett	46	179	42	.235	2	24
Edgar Smith	30	115	25	.217	0	16
Lew Brown	14	54	13	.241	0	9

=== Pitching ===
==== Starting pitchers ====
Note: G = Games pitched; IP = Innings pitched; W = Wins; L = Losses; ERA = Earned run average; SO = Strikeouts

Player	G	IP	W	L	ERA	SO
Jim Whitney	62	514.0	37	21	2.24	345
Charlie Buffinton	43	333.0	25	14	3.03	188

==== Other pitchers ====
Note: G = Games pitched; IP = Innings pitched; W = Wins; L = Losses; ERA = Earned run average; SO = Strikeouts

Player	G	IP	W	L	ERA	SO
John Morrill	2	13.0	1	0	2.77	5
