= Jack Burdock =

American baseball player (1852–1931)

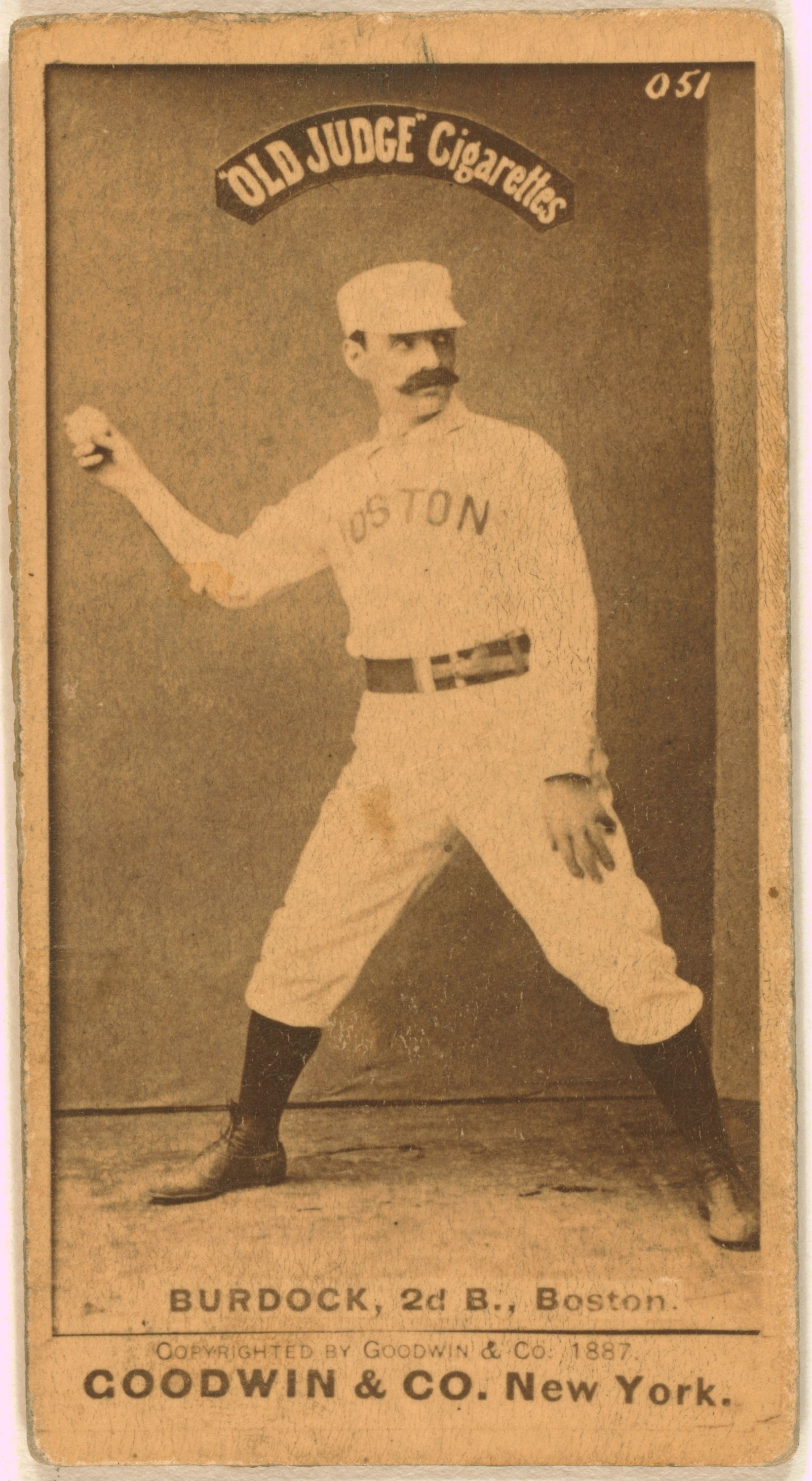
- Second baseman
- Born: April 1852; Brooklyn, New York, U.S.
- Died: November 27, 1931 (aged 79); Brooklyn, New York, U.S.
- Batted: Right Threw: Right

MLB debut
- May 2, 1872, for the Brooklyn Atlantics

Last MLB appearance
- June 23, 1891, for the Brooklyn Grooms

MLB statistics
- Batting average: .250
- Home runs: 18
- Runs batted in: 501
- Stats at Baseball Reference

Teams
- Brooklyn Atlantics (1872–1873); New York Mutuals (1874); Hartford Dark Blues (1875–1877); Boston Red Caps/Beaneaters (1878–1888); Brooklyn Bridegrooms/Grooms (1888–1891)

John Joseph Burdock (April 1852 – November 27, 1931), nicknamed "Black Jack", was an American second baseman in Major League Baseball who played for several teams over a 20-year playing career. Burdock was known as a skilled fielder, and he recorded the first known out on a major-league hidden ball trick. He was player-manager for the 1883 Boston Beaneaters when they won a league pennant.

By the late 1880s, Burdock struggled with injuries and alcoholism, and he was released by Boston during the 1888 season. He was signed by the Brooklyn Bridegrooms for the rest of that year, was out of baseball for the next two seasons, and retired after playing part of the 1891 season with Brooklyn.

== Early career ==
Burdock made his professional debut in 1872 with the Brooklyn Atlantics at age 20. He played catcher for the struggling team during its first two seasons in the National Association. He was converted to second base in 1874 with the New York Mutuals, and then spent three years with the Hartford Dark Blues. The Dark Blues joined the National League in 1876, and Burdock stayed with the team through 1877. He signed with the Boston Red Caps the next year.

== Boston Red Caps ==
By the time that Burdock arrived in Boston in 1878, he had become one of the game's premier second basemen. He led NL second basemen in putouts each year between 1876 and 1880, and by 1884, he had led his position in fielding percentage several times. An 1881 horse car accident had nearly derailed Burdock's career; he was rendered unconscious and local newspaper coverage indicated that he was taken home in critical condition. Despite dire predictions, Burdock recovered quickly from the head injury and did not miss significant playing time.

Burdock did not hit particularly well, but he stood out offensively in 1883, surging to 88 runs batted in; he did not drive in half that many runs in any other major-league season. That same year, Burdock succeeded first baseman John Morrill as the team's manager. After the team started the season 30-24, the managerial job went back to Morrill and Burdock devoted his full attention to second base. The team captured the National League pennant.

Burdock held an unusually close association with baseball's hidden ball trick. In May 1876, Burdock executed what is thought to be the first hidden ball trick in the major leagues, and in August of the same year, he recorded another out with the trick. In the ninth inning of a close game in 1881, Burdock hit a double but was tagged out on a hidden ball trick. As of 2015, he was one of nine MLB players to have been a "victim" and a "perpetrator" of such a play.

== After Boston ==
In the latter part of his career, Burdock suffered injuries and he developed a drinking problem. Because of his intemperance, Boston released him in the middle of the 1888 season. At the time of Burdock's release, baseball teams were phasing out left-handed second basemen, and the Brooklyn Bridegrooms were seeking to replace Bill McClellan. Brooklyn team president Charlie Byrne acknowledged Burdock's damaged reputation, but he agreed to give Burdock a chance with the team. Shortly after Burdock was signed, he faced criminal charges for kissing a woman while he was intoxicated, but he was acquitted at trial.

Burdock was out of the major leagues in 1889 and 1890. He retired at age 39 after coming back to play for the Grooms in 1891.

Burdock died on November 27, 1931, in Brooklyn at age 79. He was buried at the Holy Cross Cemetery.

== See also ==
- List of Major League Baseball player–managers
