= Magnolia Cemetery (Philadelphia) =

Cemetery in Philadelphia, Pennsylvania

Coordinates: 40°01′27″N 75°03′10″W

Magnolia Cemetery is a historic cemetery in the Tacony neighborhood of Philadelphia, Pennsylvania. It was established in 1886. The cemetery grounds are bounded by Levick, Ditman, Hellerman, and Cottage Streets. Its business office is located on the grounds the address for the office is PO Box 287 Feasterville PA 19053.

The cemetery sits on land that was once part of Frances "Fanny" Saltar's Magnolia Cottage estate, part of the former 151-acre Magnolia Grove plantation of Thomas Gordon, who purchased the property sometime after 1759. Magnolia Cottage sat just southeast of today's intersection of Cottage Street and Magee Avenue (formerly Saltar's Lane). The cemetery and Cottage Street were named for it. Fanny's well-known "Reminiscences of Colonial Days in Philadelphia" were written at Magnolia Cottage.

The cemetery was expanded in 1896 to nine acres.

== Notable burials ==
- Joseph H. "Joe" Mulvey (1858–1928), major league baseball player, played for three different Philadelphia teams
- Several members of the family of 19th-century industrialist Henry Disston, "the father of modern Tacony," are buried at Magnolia.
