= Alonzo Breitenstein =

American baseball player (1857–1932)

- Pitcher
- Born: November 9, 1857; Utica, New York
- Died: June 19, 1932 (aged 74); Utica, New York
- Batted: Unknown Threw: Unknown

MLB debut
- July 7, 1883, for the Philadelphia Quakers

Last MLB appearance
- July 7, 1883, for the Philadelphia Quakers

MLB statistics
- Win–loss record: 0–1
- Earned run average: 9.00
- Strikeouts: 0
- Stats at Baseball Reference

Teams
- Philadelphia Quakers (1883)

Alonzo Breitenstein (November 9, 1857 – June 19, 1932) was a National League pitcher. Breitenstein played for the Philadelphia Quakers in the 1883 season. In one career game, he had a 0–1 record with a 9.00 ERA. Breitenstein allowed nine runs on eight hits, in five innings pitched. He was removed from the game at relieved by Art Hagan after being hit by a pitch while batting. With what hand he batted and threw is unknown.

== Life ==
Alonzo Breitenstein was born on November 9, 1857, in Utica, New York. He died on June 19, 1932, in Utica. He was buried at Forest Hill Cemetery in Utica.
