= 1883 Chicago White Stockings season =

1883 Chicago White Stockings
- League: National League
- Ballpark: Lakefront Park
- City: Chicago
- Record: 59–39 (.602)
- League place: 2nd
- Owner: Albert Spalding
- Manager: Cap Anson

The 1883 Chicago White Stockings season was the 12th season of the Chicago White Stockings franchise, the eighth in the National League and the sixth at Lakefront Park. The White Stockings finished second in the National League with a record of 59–39.

== Regular season ==
=== Season standings ===
National League
Team	W	L	Pct.	GB	Home	Road
Boston Beaneaters	63	35	.643	—	41‍–‍8	22‍–‍27
Chicago White Stockings	59	39	.602	4	36‍–‍13	23‍–‍26
Providence Grays	58	40	.592	5	34‍–‍15	24‍–‍25
Cleveland Blues	55	42	.567	7½	31‍–‍18	24‍–‍24
Buffalo Bisons	49	45	.521	12	36‍–‍13	13‍–‍32
New York Gothams	46	50	.479	16	28‍–‍19	18‍–‍31
Detroit Wolverines	40	58	.408	23	23‍–‍26	17‍–‍32
Philadelphia Quakers	17	81	.173	46	9‍–‍40	8‍–‍41

=== Record vs. opponents ===
1883 National League record Sources:
Team	BSN	BUF	CHI	CLE	DET	NYG	PHI	PRO
Boston	—	7–7	7–7	10–4	10–4	7–7	14–0	8–6
Buffalo	7–7	—	5–9	7–7	9–5–1	8–5	9–5	7–7
Chicago	7–7	9–5	—	6–8	9–5	9–5	12–2	7–7
Cleveland	4–10	7–7	8–6	—	9–5–1	7–6–2	12–2	8–6
Detroit	4–10	5–9–1	5–9	5–9–1	—	8–6	11–3–1	2–12
New York	7–7	5–8	5–9	6–7–2	6–8	—	12–2	5–9
Philadelphia	0–14	5–9	2–12	2–12	3–11–1	2–12	—	3–11
Providence	6–8	7–7	7–7	6–8	12–2	9–5	11–3	—

== Roster ==
1883 Chicago White Stockings
Roster
Pitchers: Larry Corcoran; Fred Goldsmith; Catchers: Silver Flint	Infielders: Cap Anson; Tom Burns; Fred Pfeffer; Ned Williamson	Outfielders: Abner Dalrymple; George Gore; King Kelly; Billy Sunday	Manager: Cap Anson

== Player stats ==
=== Batting ===
==== Starters by position ====
Note: Pos = Position; G = Games played; AB = At bats; H = Hits; Avg. = Batting average; HR = Home runs; RBI = Runs batted in

Pos	Player	G	AB	H	Avg.	HR	RBI
C	Silver Flint	85	332	88	.265	0	32
1B	Cap Anson	98	413	127	.308	0	68
2B	Fred Pfeffer	96	371	87	.235	1	45
3B	Ned Williamson	98	402	111	.276	2	59
SS	Tom Burns	97	405	119	.294	2	67
OF	Abner Dalrymple	80	363	108	.298	2	37
OF	George Gore	92	392	131	.334	2	52
OF	King Kelly	98	428	109	.255	3	61

==== Other batters ====
Note: G = Games played; AB = At bats; H = Hits; Avg. = Batting average; HR = Home runs; RBI = Runs batted in

Player	G	AB	H	Avg.	HR	RBI
Billy Sunday	14	54	13	.241	0	5

=== Pitching ===
==== Starting pitchers ====
Note: G = Games pitched; IP = Innings pitched; W = Wins; L = Losses; ERA = Earned run average; SO = Strikeouts

Player	G	IP	W	L	ERA	SO
Larry Corcoran	56	473.2	34	20	2.49	216
Fred Goldsmith	46	383.1	25	19	3.15	82

==== Relief pitchers ====
Note: G = Games pitched; W = Wins; L = Losses; SV = Saves; ERA = Earned run average; SO = Strikeouts

Player	G	W	L	SV	ERA	SO
Cap Anson	2	0	0	1	0.00	0
King Kelly	1	0	0	0	0.00	0
Ned Williamson	1	0	0	0	9.00	1
