= Abe Wolstenholme =

American baseball player (1861–1916)

- Catcher/Left fielder
- Born: March 4, 1861; Philadelphia, Pennsylvania
- Died: April 3, 1916 (aged 55); Philadelphia, Pennsylvania
- Batted: Unknown Threw: Unknown

MLB debut
- June 4, 1883, for the Philadelphia Quakers

Last MLB appearance
- June 11, 1883, for the Philadelphia Quakers

MLB statistics
- Games played: 3
- At bats: 11
- Hits: 1
- Stats at Baseball Reference

Teams
- Philadelphia Quakers (1883)

Abraham Lincoln Wolstenholme (March 4, 1861 – March 4, 1916) was a professional baseball player. He appeared in three games in Major League Baseball for the Philadelphia Quakers in the 1883 season, two as a catcher and one as a left fielder. In three career games, he had one hit in 11 at-bats.

Wolstenholme died in his home town of Philadelphia, Pennsylvania in 1916, of Uremia.
