= Edgar Smith (Boston Beaneaters outfielder) =

American baseball player

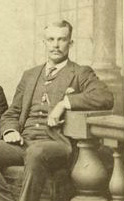
- Outfielder
- Born: October 15, 1860; North Haven, Connecticut, U.S.
- Died: unknown unknown
- Batted: Unknown Threw: Right

MLB debut
- June 20, 1883, for the Boston Beaneaters

Last MLB appearance
- September 29, 1883, for the Boston Beaneaters

MLB statistics
- Batting average: .217
- Home runs: 0
- Runs batted in: 16
- Stats at Baseball Reference

Teams
- Boston Beaneaters (1883)

Albert Edgar Smith (October 15, 1860 – unknown) was an American Major League Baseball player who played outfield in 1883. He played 30 games for the Boston Beaneaters.
