= Charlie Kelly (baseball) =

American baseball player (1862–1940)

- Third baseman/Shortstop
- Born: February 25, 1862; Kellyville, Pennsylvania, U.S.
- Died: January 5, 1940 (aged 77); Clifton Heights, Pennsylvania, U.S.
- Batted: Right Threw: Right

MLB debut
- June 14, 1883, for the Philadelphia Quakers

Last MLB appearance
- June 10, 1886, for the Philadelphia Athletics

MLB statistics
- Games played: 3
- At bats: 10
- Hits: 1
- Stats at Baseball Reference

Teams
- Philadelphia Quakers (1883); Philadelphia Athletics (1886)

Charles H. Kelly (February 25, 1862–January 5, 1940) was an American Major League Baseball third baseman.
