= Charlie Hilsey =

American baseball player (1864–1918)

- Pitcher / Outfielder
- Born: March 23, 1864; Philadelphia, Pennsylvania, U.S.
- Died: October 31, 1918 (aged 54); Philadelphia, Pennsylvania, U.S.
- Batted: Unknown Threw: Unknown

MLB debut
- September 27, 1883, for the Philadelphia Quakers

Last MLB appearance
- June 16, 1884, for the Philadelphia Athletics

MLB statistics
- Games pitched: 6
- Win–loss record: 2–4
- Earned run average: 5.09
- Stats at Baseball Reference

Teams
- Philadelphia Quakers (1883); Philadelphia Athletics (1884)

Charles T. Hilsey (March 23, 1864 – October 31, 1918) was an American Major League Baseball (MLB) pitcher. After playing in the Majors in 1883 and 1884 he played in the minor leagues in 1885 and 1887.
