= Bill McClellan =

American baseball player (1856–1929)

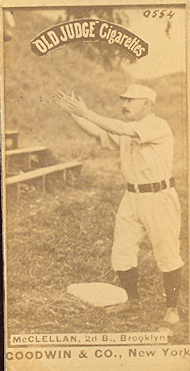
- Second baseman / Shortstop
- Born: March 22, 1856; Chicago, Illinois, U.S.
- Died: July 3, 1929 (aged 73); Chicago, Illinois, U.S.
- Batted: Switch Threw: Left

MLB debut
- May 20, 1878, for the Chicago White Stockings

Last MLB appearance
- October 17, 1888, for the Cleveland Blues

MLB statistics
- Batting average: .242
- Home runs: 6
- Runs batted in: 304
- Stats at Baseball Reference

Teams
- Chicago White Stockings (1878); Providence Grays (1881); Philadelphia Quakers (1883–1884); Brooklyn Grays / Bridegrooms (1885–1888); Cleveland Blues (1888)

William Henry McClellan (March 22, 1856 – July 3, 1929) was an American professional baseball infielder. He played in Major League Baseball (MLB) for eight seasons, primarily as a second baseman and shortstop from 1878 to 1888.

Born in Chicago, McClellan played one season for the St. Paul Red Caps of the League Alliance in 1877. He appeared with the Chicago White Stockings of the National League in 1878, then with the Washington Nationals of the Nationals of the National Association in 1879 and 1880. McClellan returned to the National League and the American Association after that, and he led the league in games played in 1885 (112) and 1886 (141) with the Brooklyn Grays.

McClellan was unwittingly involved in the first of several forfeits that resulted from disagreements between a two-man umpiring crew. On July 14, 1888, the single scheduled umpire for the Brooklyn-Kansas City game was unable to make the game. Brooklyn's Bill Terry had umpired other games and was volunteered as a replacement umpire, but Kansas City asked that one of their players, Jim Donahue, be named the base umpire. In a close game in the ninth inning, Donahue called McClellan out on a pickoff play. Brooklyn captain Dave Foutz ordered his team off the field in protest, and the game was ruled a forfeit in favor of Kansas City.

Despite the fact that McClelland had come off a good season in 1887, Brooklyn benched McClellan midway through 1888 and gave his starting position to Jack Burdock, a 36-year-old player who had just been released by Boston for intemperance. Toward the end of the 1888 season, Brooklyn sold McClellan to the Cleveland Blues, and he finished his major league career there that year. McClellan had lost his job in Brooklyn amid a shift away from left-handed middle infielders. In the early 1880s, left-handers had not been uncommon at these positions, but they became much more rare by the end of that decade.

After the 1888 season, McClellan played minor league baseball through 1894.

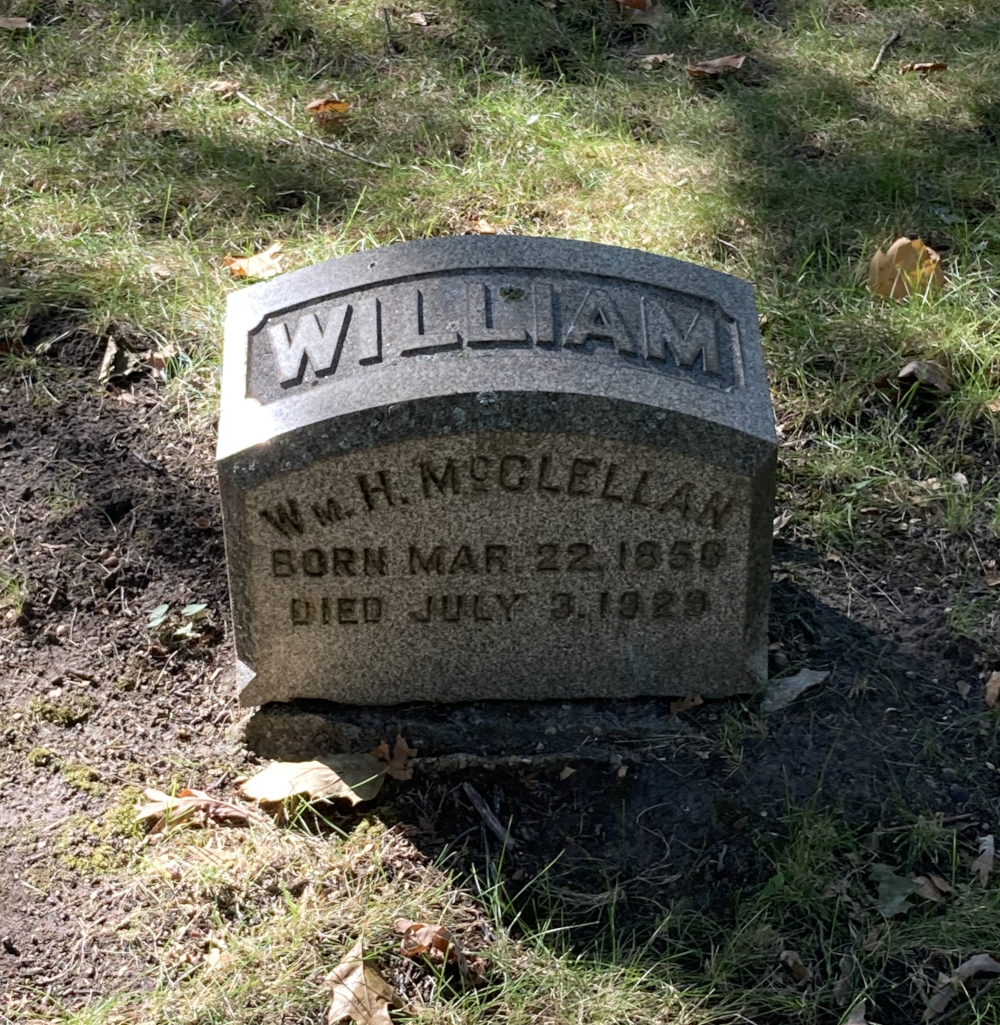
McClellan's grave at Rosehill Cemetery

He died at the age of 73 in his hometown of Chicago, and was interred at Rosehill Cemetery.
