= Frank McIntyre (baseball) =

American baseball player (1859–1887)

- Pitcher
- Born: July 12, 1859; Walled Lake, Michigan
- Died: July 8, 1887 (aged 27); Detroit, Michigan
- Batted: Unknown Threw: Unknown

MLB debut
- May 16, 1883, for the Detroit Wolverines

Last MLB appearance
- June 20, 1883, for the Columbus Buckeyes

MLB statistics
- Win–loss record: 2–1
- Earned run average: 3.60
- Strikeouts: 6

Teams
- Detroit Wolverines (1883); Columbus Buckeyes (1883)

Frank W. McIntyre (July 12, 1859 – July 8, 1887) was a Major League Baseball pitcher. He started one game for the 1883 Detroit Wolverines and two games for the 1883 Columbus Buckeyes. he died on July 8 1887 at 27 of Tuberculosis in Michigan
