= Will Sawyer =

American baseball player (1864–1936)

- Pitcher
- Born: July 29, 1864; Brimfield Township, Ohio
- Died: January 5, 1936 (aged 71); Kent, Ohio
- Batted: Left Threw: Left

MLB debut
- July 21, 1883, for the Cleveland Blues

Last MLB appearance
- September 29, 1883, for the Cleveland Blues

MLB statistics
- Win–loss record: 4–10
- Earned run average: 2.36
- Strikeouts: 76
- Stats at Baseball Reference

Teams
- Cleveland Blues (1883)

Willard Newton Sawyer (July 29, 1864 – January 5, 1936) was a left-handed pitcher in Major League Baseball. He played for the 1883 Cleveland Blues, appearing in 17 games with 15 starts. He played in the minors with Grand Rapids of the Northwestern League in 1884. He attended Western Reserve University from 1880-1883.
