= James Pirie =

American baseball player (1853–1934)

- Shortstop
- Born: March 31, 1853; Province of Canada
- Died: June 2, 1934 (aged 81); Dundas, Ontario, Canada
- Batted: Switch Threw: Unknown

MLB debut
- September 25, 1883, for the Philadelphia Quakers

Last MLB appearance
- September 29, 1883, for the Philadelphia Quakers

MLB statistics
- Games played: 5
- At bats: 19
- Hits: 3

Teams
- Philadelphia Quakers (1883)

James Moir Pirie (March 31, 1853 – June 2, 1934) was a Major League Baseball shortstop for the 1883 Philadelphia Quakers.
