= Dick Cramer =

American baseball player

- Outfielder
- Born: Unknown; Brooklyn, New York, U.S.
- Died: August 11, 1885; Camden, New Jersey, U.S.
- Batted: Unknown Threw: Unknown

MLB debut
- May 12, 1883, for the New York Gothams

Last MLB appearance
- May 15, 1883, for the New York Gothams

MLB statistics
- Batting average: .000
- Home runs: 0
- Runs batted in: 0
- Stats at Baseball Reference

Teams
- New York Gothams (1883)

William B. Cramer was an American outfielder in Major League Baseball. He played in two games for the 1883 New York Gothams.
