= Joe Mulvey =

American baseball player (1858–1928)

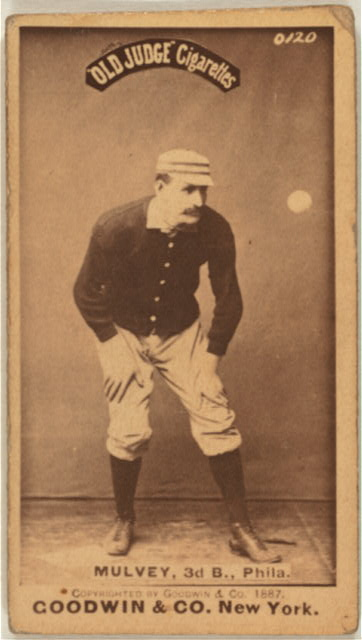
- Third baseman
- Born: October 27, 1858; Providence, Rhode Island, US
- Died: August 21, 1928 (aged 69); Philadelphia, Pennsylvania, US
- Batted: Right Threw: Right

MLB debut
- May 31, 1883, for the Providence Grays

Last MLB appearance
- May 14, 1895, for the Brooklyn Grooms

MLB statistics
- Batting average: .261
- Home runs: 28
- Runs batted in: 532
- Stats at Baseball Reference

Teams
- Providence Grays (1883); Philadelphia Quakers (1883–1889); Philadelphia Athletics (1890–1891); Philadelphia Phillies (1892); Washington Senators (1893); Brooklyn Grooms (1895)

Joseph Henry Mulvey (October 27, 1858 – August 21, 1928) was an American professional baseball third baseman. He played in Major League Baseball (MLB) from 1883 to 1895 for the Providence Grays, Philadelphia Quakers/Phillies, Philadelphia Athletics, Washington Senators, and Brooklyn Grooms. Mulvey survived a gunshot wound to the shoulder with Providence in his first major league season, and he became best known as a third baseman for the three Philadelphia teams between 1883 and 1892.

== Early career ==
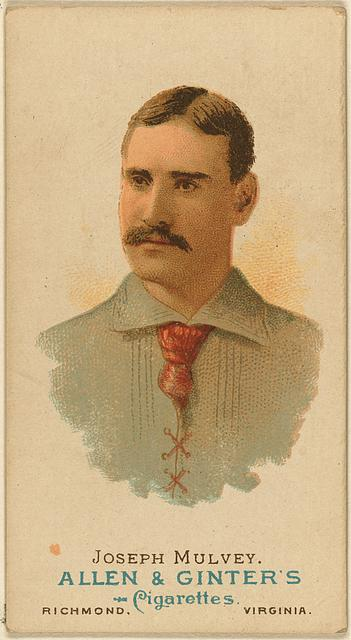
Mulvey on a baseball card, 1887

Mulvey broke into the major leagues with the Providence Grays of the National League in 1883. He played in a total of four games for the Grays, but his tenure there was not without some excitement.

In June 1883, Grays outfielder Cliff Carroll had antagonized one of the team's fans – a man named Jimmy Murphy – by spraying Murphy with a water hose as the fan was watching the Grays warm up. Enraged, Murphy went home and retrieved a gun. Mulvey was not seriously injured in the shooting, and Murphy was arrested. He returned to the park, waited until the players were leaving the field at the end of the game, and fired a shot at Carroll. His aim was off, and the bullet struck Mulvey in the shoulder. Mulvey sustained only a flesh wound, and Murphy was arrested.

Mulvey was traded to the Philadelphia Quakers (later renamed the Philadelphia Phillies) shortly after the shooting, and he played in another three games that season after switching to third base. The following year, Mulvey began playing regularly for the Quakers, appearing in 100 of their 120 games. He would play regularly for Quakers/Phillies through the 1889 season.

== Later career ==
In 1890, following many other stars of the National League, he jumped to the Players' League, where he joined the Philadelphia Athletics as their starting 3rd baseman. When the Players' League folded after a single season, the Athletics moved to the American Association, and Mulvey went with the team.

The 1892 season saw Mulvey rejoining the Phillies, where he was now the back-up to Charlie Reilly. The following season saw him traded to the Washington Senators, where he split 3rd base duties with 3 other players: Duke Farrell, Cub Stricker, and Sam Wise. Mulvey did not play in the 1894 season, but he returned to baseball for the 1895 season, playing with the Brooklyn Grooms, as the backup to Billy Shindle.

For his career, Mulvey batted .261, with 28 home runs. According to his statistics, his best year was 1890 with the Philadelphia Athletics, in which he achieved career highs for RBIs (87), walks (27), on-base percentage (.326), slugging percentage (.428) and doubles (26). He almost equaled his career bests for home runs (5) and batting average that year as well (.287). The most home runs he had in any one year was 6, with the Phillies in 1884 and 1889, and his best batting average was .289, also with the Phillies in 1889.

Along with five other players, Mulvey still holds the record for most errors by a third baseman in a single game, 6, set on July 30, 1884.

== Death ==
Mulvey was found dead inside the Phillies locker room at Shibe Park on the morning of August 21, 1928. He worked at the park as a watchman and had attended a boxing match there the previous night. Mulvey, who was 69, appeared to have suffered from heart problems. He is interred at Magnolia Cemetery.
