= George Radbourn =

American baseball player (1856–1904)

- Pitcher
- Born: April 8, 1856; Bloomington, Illinois
- Died: January 1, 1904 (aged 47); Bloomington, Illinois
- Batted: Unknown Threw: Unknown

MLB debut
- May 30, 1883, for the Detroit Wolverines

Last MLB appearance
- June 6, 1883, for the Detroit Wolverines

MLB statistics
- Win–loss record: 1–2
- Earned run average: 6.55
- Strikeouts: 2

Teams
- Detroit Wolverines (1883)

George B. Radbourn (April 8, 1856 – January 1, 1904) was a Major League Baseball pitcher. Radbourn played for the Detroit Wolverines in 1883. In 3 career games, he had a 1–2 record with a 6.55 ERA.

Radbourn was born and died in Bloomington, Illinois.
