= Edgar Smith (pitcher/outfielder) =

American baseball player (1862–1892)

- Pitcher / Outfielder
- Born: June 12, 1862; Providence, Rhode Island, U.S.
- Died: November 3, 1892 (aged 30); Providence, Rhode Island, U.S.
- Batted: Right Threw: Right

MLB debut
- May 25, 1883, for the Providence Grays

Last MLB appearance
- August 12, 1890, for the Cleveland Spiders

MLB statistics
- Games played: 26
- Batting average: .184
- Runs batted in: 6
- Win–loss record: 2–7
- Earned run average: 5.05
- Strikeouts: 18
- Stats at Baseball Reference

Teams
- Providence Grays (1883); Philadelphia Quakers (1883); Washington Statesmen (1884); Providence Grays (1885); Cleveland Spiders (1890)

Edgar Eugene Smith (June 12, 1862 – November 3, 1892) was an American professional baseball outfielder and pitcher in Major League Baseball from 1883 to 1885 and then again in 1890. He stood 5 feet 10 inches (1.78 m) tall and weighed 160 pounds (73 kg). Smith batted and threw right-handed.

A native of Providence, Rhode Island, Smith became a well-known amateur baseball player in New England. He made his major league debut in 1883 with his hometown Providence Grays, playing two games at first base for them. He also pitched one game for the Philadelphia Quakers that year, allowing 17 runs and taking the loss. In 1884, he played in 14 games for the Washington Statesmen, serving as both a pitcher and an outfielder. While he returned to playing amateur baseball in Providence in 1885, the Grays had him pitch for them on August 5 when their other starting pitchers were unavailable; Smith allowed just one earned run in the start as he defeated the St. Louis Maroons. He would not play again in the major leagues until 1890, when he finished his career by making eight appearances for the Cleveland Spiders. On November 3, 1892, he died of a pulmonary hemorrhage caused by tuberculosis.

== Baseball career ==
=== Providence Grays and Philadelphia Quakers (1883) ===
Edgar Eugene Smith was born on June 12, 1862, in Providence, Rhode Island. He lived at 18 Dexter Street. In his hometown, he gained local distinction as an amateur baseball player. His services were in demand because he could play several positions: pitcher, left field, right field, and occasionally first base.

He began his major league career with the Providence Grays of the National League (NL) in 1883, making his debut for them on May 25. With Smith at first base, the Grays defeated the Chicago White Stockings 9–6 at Lake Front Park in Chicago. Smith played one other game for the Grays that year, also at first base. In the contests, he recorded two hits, scored two runs, and had a run batted in (RBI). Later in the season, on June 20 he pitched a game for the Philadelphia Quakers. While Smith recorded three hits and an RBI in the game, he did not do well on the mound; he allowed 18 hits and 17 runs in seven innings, and took a loss as the Boston Beaneaters defeated Philadelphia by a score of 29–4 at Boston's South End Grounds. Smith also played minor league baseball for the Brooklyn Grays of the Interstate Association in 1883.

=== Washington Statesmen (1884) ===
In 1884, he played in 14 games for the Washington Statesmen of the American Association. Used as a pitcher in three games, he lost both of his starts and also made one relief appearance, after having begun the game in the outfield. Counting the relief appearance, he played 12 games in the outfield as well. Smith batted .088 with five runs scored, five hits (one of which was a triple) and no RBI for Washington.

=== Providence Grays (1885) ===
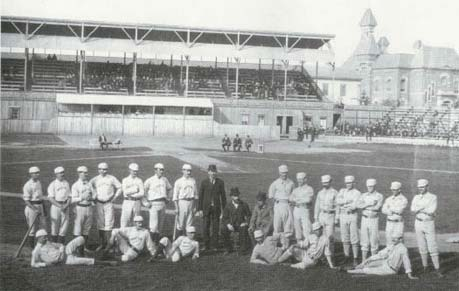
The Messer Street Grounds, where Smith won his only major league start of 1885

Smith was pitching for an amateur team in Providence in 1885 when an opportunity arose for him to return to the major leagues. On August 5, Charles Radbourn, Joe Start, and Dupee Shaw were all unavailable to pitch for Providence, officially because of an illness, though rumor had it that the players simply wanted the day off. Not having any other starting pitchers on his roster, Providence manager Frank Bancroft had the team sign Smith to start that day's game against the St. Louis Maroons at the Messer Street Grounds in Providence. Fans feared that the team would struggle with an amateur on the mound, but Smith limited St. Louis to nine hits and three runs (only one of which was earned) as Providence won the game 4–3. The next day's account of the game in The New York Times reported that "Edgar Smith, a young amateur, did the pitching [...] Sharp fielding gained the victory." Though that was his only major league game in 1885, Smith also played for the Columbus Stars, a Georgia team in the Southern League.

=== Minor leagues (1886–89) ===
The Grays ceased to exist as a major league team following the 1885 campaign, but a minor league team of the same name participated in the Eastern League in 1886, playing at the Messer Street Grounds. Smith played for them, but the team folded in June. After that, Smith played for the Boston Blues of the New England League. He was still with the team when it moved to Haverhill, Massachusetts in 1887. Smith later pitched for the Detroit Wolverines of the International League and the International Association.

=== Cleveland Spiders (1890) ===
In 1890, Smith returned to the major leagues, playing in eight games for the NL's Cleveland Spiders. He was the team's starting pitcher in six of these contests. Smith completed five of his starts but lost four out of five decisions, posting a 4.30 earned run average (ERA). He struck out 11 batters and walked 10, allowing 42 hits in 44 innings pitched. His other appearances were all in the outfield. In 24 at bats, Smith batted .292 with two runs scored, seven hits (one of which was a triple), and four RBI. He also walked four times. His final major league appearance came on August 12, 1890.

== Career statistics ==
Altogether, Smith played 26 games in the major leagues. In 11 pitching appearances, he had a 2–7 record, a 5.05 ERA, 18 strikeouts, 18 walks, and 96 hits allowed in 82 innings. As a hitter, he batted .184 with 10 runs scored, 18 hits, one double, two triples, no home runs, and six RBI.

== Death ==
Not long after his final game, Smith was stricken with tuberculosis. On November 3, 1892, he died in Providence at the age of 30. The cause of death was a pulmonary hemorrhage caused by the tuberculosis. Smith was interred at the Swan Point Cemetery in Providence.
