= Art Hagan =

American baseball player (1863–1936)

- Pitcher
- Born: March 17, 1863; Providence, Rhode Island, U.S.
- Died: March 25, 1936 (aged 73); Providence, Rhode Island, U.S.
- Batted: Unknown Threw: Right

MLB debut
- June 30, 1883, for the Philadelphia Quakers

Last MLB appearance
- May 13, 1884, for the Buffalo Bisons

MLB statistics
- Win–loss record: 2–18
- Earned run average: 5.36
- Strikeouts: 50
- Stats at Baseball Reference

Teams
- Philadelphia Quakers (1883); Buffalo Bisons (1883–1884)

Arthur Charles Hagan (March 17, 1863 – March 25, 1936) was an American Major League Baseball player who pitched for two seasons; Philadelphia Quakers of the National League in 1883, and with the Buffalo Bisons in both 1883 and 1884.

On August 21, 1883, when the Quakers traveled to Providence, Rhode Island to play the Providence Grays, Manager Bob Ferguson, needed to increase ticket sales on the road because the American Association entry in Philadelphia had forced the Quakers to reduce prices to 25 cents a game. He gave the starting pitcher duties to Art, who was a Rhode Island native, with the idea the appearance of Hagen would draw the locals. The strategy worked as the fans came in large numbers. However, Hagen surrendered 28 runs and the Quakers made 20 errors behind him, as Philadelphia lost in the most lopsided shutout in major league history, 28–0. Charles "Old Hoss" Radbourn was the winning pitcher.

Art died at the age of 73 in his hometown of Providence, and is interred at St. Ann Cemetery in Cranston, Rhode Island.
