= 1880 Worcester Worcesters season =

1880 Worcester Worcesters
- League: National League
- Ballpark: Worcester Driving Park Grounds
- City: Worcester, Massachusetts
- Record: 40–43 (.482)
- League place: 5th
- Manager: Frank Bancroft
- Captain: Lon Knight

The 1880 season was the first for the Worcester Worcesters franchise in the National League, having played 1879 in the National Association. The team finished its initial season with a 40–43 record, good for fifth place. Lee Richmond threw a perfect game on June 12, 1880, the first ever perfect game in Major League Baseball history in a 1–0 victory over the Cleveland Blues. On August 20, they became the first major-league team to be no-hit at home when Pud Galvin of the Buffalo Bisons defeated them, 1–0.

== Regular season ==
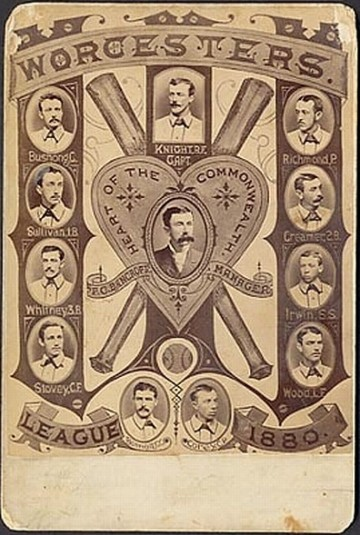
Worcester Worcesters, 1880

=== Season standings ===
National League
Team	W	L	Pct.	GB	Home	Road
Chicago White Stockings	67	17	.798	—	37‍–‍5	30‍–‍12
Providence Grays	52	32	.619	15	31‍–‍12	21‍–‍20
Cleveland Blues	47	37	.560	20	24‍–‍19	23‍–‍18
Troy Trojans	41	42	.494	25½	20‍–‍21	21‍–‍21
Worcester Worcesters	40	43	.482	26½	24‍–‍17	16‍–‍26
Boston Red Caps	40	44	.476	27	25‍–‍17	15‍–‍27
Buffalo Bisons	24	58	.293	42	13‍–‍28	11‍–‍30
Cincinnati Stars	21	59	.263	44	14‍–‍25	7‍–‍34

=== Record vs. opponents ===
1880 National League record Sources:
Team	BSN	BUF	CHI	CIN	CLE	PRO	TRO	WOR
Boston	—	9–3–1	3–9	7–5	5–7	5–7–1	7–5	4–8
Buffalo	3–9–1	—	1–11	5–5–2	3–9	2–10	1–11	9–3
Chicago	9–3	11–1	—	10–2–1	8–4	9–3–1	10–2	10–2
Cincinnati	5–7	5–5–2	2–10–1	—	3–9	2–10	1–10	3–8
Cleveland	7–5	9–3	4–8	9–3	—	3–9	9–3	6–6–1
Providence	7–5–1	10–2	3–9–1	10–2	9–3	—	7–5	6–6–1
Troy	5–7	11–1	2–10	10–1	3–9	5–7	—	5–7
Worcester	8–4	3–9	2–10	8–3	6–6–1	6–6–1	7–5	—

=== Roster ===
1880 Worcester Worcesters
Roster
Pitchers: Tricky Nichols; Lee Richmond; Catchers: Charlie Bennett; Doc Bushong	Infielders: George Creamer; Joe Ellick; Arthur Irwin; Chub Sullivan; Bill Tobin; Art Whitney	Outfielders: Fred Corey; Buttercup Dickerson; Steve Dignan; Jerry Dorgan; Billy Geer; Lon Knight; Bill McGunnigle; Harry Stovey; George Wood	Manager: Frank Bancroft

== Player stats ==
=== Batting ===
==== Starters by position ====
Note: Pos = Position; G = Games played; AB = At bats; H = Hits; Avg. = Batting average; HR = Home runs; RBI = Runs batted in

Pos	Player	G	AB	H	Avg.	HR	RBI
C	Charlie Bennett	51	193	44	.228	0	18
1B	Chub Sullivan	43	166	43	.259	0	?
2B	George Creamer	85	306	61	.199	0	27
3B	Art Whitney	76	302	67	.222	1	36
SS	Arthur Irwin	85	352	91	.259	1	35
OF	George Wood	81	327	80	.245	0	28
OF	Lon Knight	49	201	48	.239	0	21
OF	Harry Stovey	83	355	94	.265	6	28

==== Other batters ====
Note: G = Games played; AB = At bats; H = Hits; Avg. = Batting average; HR = Home runs; RBI = Runs batted in

Player	G	AB	H	Avg.	HR	RBI
Doc Bushong	41	146	25	.171	0	19
Fred Corey	41	138	24	.174	0	6
Buttercup Dickerson	31	133	39	.293	0	20
Jerry Dorgan	10	35	7	.200	0	1
Joe Ellick	5	18	1	.056	0	0
Bill Tobin	5	16	2	.125	0	3
Steve Dignan	3	10	3	.300	0	2
Billy Geer	2	6	0	.000	0	0
Bill McGunnigle	1	4	0	.000	0	0

=== Pitching ===
==== Starting pitchers ====
Note: G = Games pitched; IP = Innings pitched; W = Wins; L = Losses; ERA = Earned run average; SO = Strikeouts

Player	G	IP	W	L	ERA	SO
Lee Richmond	74	590.2	32	32	2.15	243
Fred Corey	25	148.1	8	9	2.43	47
Tricky Nichols	2	17.2	0	2	4.08	4

==== Relief pitchers ====
Note: G = Games pitched; W = Wins; L = Losses; SV = Saves; ERA = Earned run average; SO = Strikeouts

Player	G	W	L	SV	ERA	SO
Harry Stovey	2	0	0	0	4.50	3
