= John Montgomery Ward's perfect game =

1880 Major League Baseball game

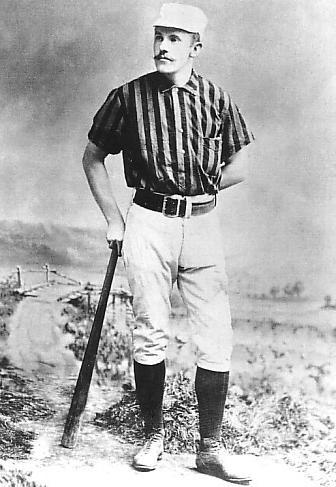
- John Montgomery Ward, depicted circa 1877–1894
Providence Grays	Buffalo Bisons
5	0
	1	2	3	4	5	6	7	8	9	R	H	E
Providence Grays	0	1	0	1	0	0	1	1	1	5	13	0
Buffalo Bisons	0	0	0	0	0	0	0	0	0	0	0	7
- Date: June 17, 1880
- Venue: Messer Street Grounds
- City: Providence, Rhode Island
- Managers: John Montgomery Ward (Providence Grays); Sam Crane (Buffalo Bisons)
- Attendance: 1800

On June 17, 1880, John Montgomery Ward of the Providence Grays threw a perfect game against the Buffalo Bisons at Messer Street Grounds. It was the second perfect game in Major League Baseball history, which at the time only consisted of the National League (NL). Ward's perfect game occurred just five days after Lee Richmond's perfect game.

Ward was one of the best pitchers in the NL, and posted a 1.74 earned run average in 1880. Due to limited reporting from contemporary sources, little is known about Ward's perfect game outside of the box score. The opposing pitcher was Pud Galvin, who allowed five runs in nine innings. One newspaper noted there were a couple of strong defensive plays that helped preserve Ward's perfect game, such as a difficult catch made by center fielder Paul Hines, and "some wonderful stops" by shortstop John Peters.

The concept of a perfect game did not exist in 1880, and thus there was little discussion of Ward's accomplishment. Newspapers primarily focused on the lack of errors in the game. The legitimacy of both Richmond's and Ward's perfect game when compared to other MLB perfect games are the occasional subject of debate among sportswriters. The main criticism of their accomplishments is that the rules of baseball in 1880 greatly differed from modern day rules. Although MLB.com does include Richmond and Ward in their list of MLB perfect games, some sportswriters exclude them, and instead describe their perfect games as pioneering accomplishments.

== Background ==
=== Perfect game ===
In baseball, a perfect game occurs when one or more pitchers for one team complete a full game with no batter from the opposing team reaching base. In baseball leagues that feature nine-inning games like Major League Baseball (MLB), this means the pitchers involved must record an out against 27 consecutive batters, without allowing anyone to reach on a hit, walks, hit batsmen, uncaught third strikes, catcher's interference, fielder's obstruction, or fielding errors. It is widely considered by sportswriters to be the hardest single-game accomplishment in baseball, as it requires an incredible pitching performance, defensive support, and immense luck to pull off. From 1876 to 2023, there were over 237,000 games officially recognized by MLB; only 24 were perfect games. Prior to Ward's perfect game, the most recent occurrence happened five days earlier on June 12, when Lee Richmond of the Worcester Worcesters threw one against the Cleveland Blues.

=== John Montgomery Ward ===
John Montgomery Ward made his professional baseball debut for the Providence Grays in 1878. In his first year, Ward posted an earned run average (ERA) of 1.51, the lowest of any pitcher in the NL. The following year, the Grays won the NL pennant. Ward was instrumental in the team's success, as he won 47 of the team's 59 victories, led the league in strikeouts with 239, and had a 2.15 ERA. Ward also played third base and outfield whenever Bobby Mathews pitched. The Grays failed to repeat as NL pennant champions in 1880, and early in the season, Ward replaced Mike McGeary as team manager. Ward's 1880 pitching stats were once again excellent; he had a win–loss record of 39–24, had an ERA of 1.74, and struck out 230 batters. He also threw a league-best eight shutouts, one of which was his perfect game.

== The game ==
Ward's perfect game occurred on June 17, 1880. The Grays were playing the Buffalo Bisons at Messer Street Grounds in Providence, Rhode Island. Although Messer Street Grounds was the home field of the Grays, a customary pregame coin flip determined the Grays would be the visiting team while the Bisons would be the home team. The decision was made to start the game earlier than normal, to allow spectators to watch a boat race in the Seekonk River in the afternoon. In his book Perfect: The Inside Story of Baseball's Sixteen Perfect Games, author James Buckley notes that due to the early start time, batters may have been affected by the glare of the sun overhead.

Ward's opposition was future Hall of Fame pitcher Pud Galvin, who gave up five runs in nine innings. The first run of the game came as a result of an error by the Bisons left fielder Oscar Walker. In the second inning, Jack Farrell hit a double, but Walker committed a throwing error after fielding the ball that allowed Farrell to score on the same play. Due to limited reporting from contemporary sources, little is known about Ward’s pitching performance or the defensive support he received. A Providence based newspaper noted that center fielder Paul Hines made a difficult catch that likely would have resulted in a double, and that shortstop John Peters made "some wonderful stops". Of the 27 batters Ward faced, only five hit the ball to outfielders. Ward mostly recorded ground ball outs, as well as two strikeouts.

== Aftermath ==
The concept of a perfect game did not exist in 1880, and thus there was little discussion of Ward's accomplishment. The New York Clipper highlighted the lack of errors in the game: "Ward pitched so effectively that not one safe hit was made off him while the entire field backed him up with perfect play. The result of this united work was that not one of the Buffalos reached first base in the entire nine innings, thus equaling the extraordinary Worcester-Cleveland contest on June 12." The Providence Journal echoed these remarks in its summary of the game, and proclaimed "the fielding and batting exhibition of the champions excellent in every respect". Baseball historian John Thorn noted that the reason journalists focused more on the lack of errors instead of the pitching performance was because errors were more commonplace in the 19th century.

By 1881, the overuse of Ward's throwing arm negatively affected his pitching abilities. Combined with the emergence of Charles Radbourn, Ward began to transition into a full time batter. After the 1882 season, Ward signed with the New York Gothams. It was here where he not only became an excellent batter, but a prominent business figure in the sport. He cofounded a players union called the Brotherhood of Professional Baseball Players and in 1890 created the short-lived Players' League in response to the NL's reserve clause. Ward retired after the 1894 season. His career stats included 2,107 hits, a lifetime batting average of .275, a win–loss record of 164–103 and a 2.10 lifetime ERA. Ward was inducted into the National Baseball Hall of Fame by the Veterans Committee in 1964.

The legitimacy of both Richmond's and Ward's perfect game when compared to other MLB perfect games are the occasional subject of debate among sportswriters. The main criticism of their accomplishments is that the rules of baseball in 1880 greatly differed from modern day rules. Pitchers could not throw pitches above their shoulder, which often necessitated an underhanded approach to pitching. There was no pitcher's mound, so pitcher's threw from a flat surface only forty-five feet from the batter as opposed to sixty feet. Additionally, batters could request where they wanted a pitch to be thrown, and if the pitch did not land in the spot the batter requested, it would be called a ball. Although MLB.com does include Richmond and Ward in their list of MLB perfect games, some sportswriters exclude them, and instead describe their perfect games as pioneering accomplishments.

== Statistics ==
Statistics taken from Baseball Almanac

=== Line score ===
Team	1	2	3	4	5	6	7	8	9	R	H	E
Providence	0	1	0	1	0	0	1	1	1	5	13	0
Buffalo	0	0	0	0	0	0	0	0	0	0	0	7

=== Box score ===
Providence	AB	R	H
Paul Hines, CF	5	0	2
Joe Start, 1B	5	1	1
Mike Dorgan, RF	5	0	2
Emil Gross, C	5	0	0
Jack Farrell, 2B	4	3	3
John Montgomery Ward, P	4	0	1
John Peters, SS	4	0	1
Tom York, LF	4	0	2
George Bradley, 3B	4	1	1
Totals	40	5	13

Providence	IP	H	R	BB	SO	HR
John Montgomery Ward	9	0	0	0	2	0
Totals	9	0	0	0	2	0

Buffalo	AB	R	H
Bill Crowley, RF-C	3	0	0
Hardy Richardson, 3B	3	0	0
Jack Rowe, C-RF	3	0	0
Oscar Walker, LF	3	0	0
Joe Hornung, 2B	3	0	0
Denny Mack, SS	3	0	0
Dude Esterbrook, 1B	3	0	0
Tom Poorman, CF	3	0	0
Pud Galvin, P	3	0	
Totals	27	0	0

Providence	IP	H	R	BB	SO	HR
Pud Galvin	9	13	5	0	2	0
Totals	9	13	5	0	2	0
