= 1880 Major League Baseball season =

1880 MLB season
- League: National League (NL)
- Sport: Baseball
- Duration: May 1 – October 1, 1880
- Games: 84
- Teams: 8

Pennant winner
- NL champions: Chicago White Stockings
- NL runners-up: Providence Grays

MLB seasons
- ← 1879 1881 →

Locations of teams for the 1880 National League season
National League

The 1880 major league baseball season was contested from May 1 through October 1, 1880, and saw the Chicago White Stockings as the pennant winner of the fifth season of the National League. There was no postseason.

The 1880 season is known for the first two major league perfect games in history, as well as being the only perfect games in the 19th century. Thrown by Lee Richmond and John Ward, these two perfect games were thrown in the span of five days, the shortest amount of time between two perfect games (the next closest is currently 20 days between Dallas Braden's May 9 and Roy Halladay's and May 29, 2010 perfect games). A perfect game would not be seen again in the Major Leagues for 24 years when Cy Young threw his perfect game in 1904.

Over the off-season, the Cincinnati Reds and Syracuse Stars disbanded, and were replaced by the Cincinnati Stars and Worcester Worcesters. This would be the Stars' only major league season.

== Schedule ==
The 1880 schedule consisted of 84 games for all eight teams of the National League. Each team was scheduled to play 12 games against the other seven teams in the league. This continued the format put in place since the previous season and would be used until 1883.

Opening Day took place on May 1 featuring all eight teams. The final day of the season was on October 1, featuring a doubleheader between the Providence Grays and Worcester Worcesters.

== Rule changes ==
The 1880 season saw the following rule changes:

- Teams that wanted to change future playing dates now needed all eight teams to approve said change. Previously, only the two mutual teams needed to agree.
- An oversight that technically allowed more than nine players to play at a time was corrected.
- Umpires are now the sole arbiters of whether a ball was unfit for play.
- Umpires will now note the time of the beginning of any rain (now without request of a team captain) and will call the game if it continued for 30 minutes.
- The concept of a walk-off hit was implemented, as now, a contest would end if the team scheduled to bat in the bottom of the ninth (or bottom of any extra inning) was winning.
- Eight balls became a base on balls, down from nine.
- A catcher must now catch a third strike before it touched the ground.

== Teams ==
An asterisk (*) denotes the ballpark a team played the minority of their home games at

League	Team	City	Ballpark	Capacity	Manager
National League	Boston Red Caps	Boston, Massachusetts	South End Grounds	3,000	Harry Wright
National League	Buffalo Bisons	Buffalo, New York	Riverside Park (Buffalo)	Unknown	Sam Crane
National League	Chicago White Stockings	Chicago, Illinois	Lakefront Park	5,000	Cap Anson
National League	Cincinnati Stars	Cincinnati, Ohio	Bank Street Grounds	3,000	John Clapp
National League	Cleveland Blues	Cleveland, Ohio	National League Park	Unknown	Jim McCormick
National League	Providence Grays	Providence, Rhode Island	Messer Street Grounds	6,000	Mike McGeary
National League	Providence Grays	Providence, Rhode Island	Messer Street Grounds	6,000	John Ward
National League	Providence Grays	Providence, Rhode Island	Messer Street Grounds	6,000	Mike Dorgan
National League	Troy Trojans	Lansingburgh, New York	Haymakers' Grounds	Unknown	Bob Ferguson
National League	Troy Trojans	Greenbush, New York	Riverside Park (Greenbush)*	Unknown*	Bob Ferguson
National League	Worcester Worcesters	Worcester, Massachusetts	Agricultural County Fair Grounds	Unknown	Frank Bancroft

1. In today's Troy, New York.
2. In today's Rensselaer, New York.

== Standings ==
=== National League ===
National League
Team	W	L	Pct.	GB	Home	Road
Chicago White Stockings	67	17	.798	—	37‍–‍5	30‍–‍12
Providence Grays	52	32	.619	15	31‍–‍12	21‍–‍20
Cleveland Blues	47	37	.560	20	24‍–‍19	23‍–‍18
Troy Trojans	41	42	.494	25½	20‍–‍21	21‍–‍21
Worcester Worcesters	40	43	.482	26½	24‍–‍17	16‍–‍26
Boston Red Caps	40	44	.476	27	25‍–‍17	15‍–‍27
Buffalo Bisons	24	58	.293	42	13‍–‍28	11‍–‍30
Cincinnati Stars	21	59	.263	44	14‍–‍25	7‍–‍34

=== Tie games ===
Eight tie games, which are not factored into winning percentage or games behind occurred throughout the season (though standings were determined by total wins, not winning percentage).

The Buffalo Bisons, Cincinnati Stars, and Providence Grays had three tie games each. The Boston Red Caps, Chicago White Stockings, and Worcester Worcesters had two tie games each. The Cleveland Blues had one tie game.

- May 19, Providence Grays vs. Boston Red Caps, tied at 5.
- June 4, Chicago White Stockings vs. Providence Grays, tied at 1.
- July 3, Worcester Worcesters vs. Cleveland Blues, tied at 4.
- August 26, Boston Red Caps vs. Buffalo Bisons, tied at 3.
- September 10, Cincinnati Stars vs. Buffalo Bisons, tied at 11.
- September 18, Cincinnati Stars vs. Chicago White Stockings, tied at 5.
- September 25, Buffalo Bisons vs. Cincinnati Stars, tied at 3.
- September 30, Providence Grays vs. Worcester Worcesters, tied at 14.

== Managerial changes ==
=== Off-season ===
Team	Former Manager	New Manager
Buffalo Bisons	John Clapp	Sam Crane
Chicago White Stockings	Silver Flint	Cap Anson
Cincinnati Reds	Cal McVey	Team folded
Providence Grays	George Wright	Mike McGeary
Syracuse Stars	Jimmy Macullar	Team folded

=== In-season ===
Team	Former Manager	New Manager
Providence Grays	Mike McGeary	John Ward
Providence Grays	John Ward	Mike Dorgan

== League leaders ==
=== National League ===
Hitting leaders
Stat	Player	Total
AVG	George Gore (CHI)	.360
OPS	George Gore (CHI)	.862
HR	Jim O'Rourke (BSN); Harry Stovey (WOR)	6
RBI	Cap Anson (CHI)	74
R	Abner Dalrymple (CHI)	91
H	Abner Dalrymple (CHI)	126

Pitching leaders
Stat	Player	Total
W	Jim McCormick (CLE)	45
L	Will White (CIN)	42
ERA	Tim Keefe (TRO)	0.86
K	Larry Corcoran (CHI)	268
IP	Jim McCormick (CLE)	657.2
SV	Lee Richmond (WOR)	3
WHIP	Tim Keefe (TRO)	0.800

== Milestones ==
=== Pitchers ===
==== Perfect games ====
- Lee Richmond (WOR):
  - Pitched the first perfect game in Major League history and the only in franchise history on June 12 against the Cleveland Blues. Richmond struck out five in the 1–0 victory. There was little discussion about the perfect game as the concept did not exist in 1880.
- John Montgomery Ward (PRO):
  - Pitched the second perfect game in Major League history and the only in franchise history on June 17 against the Buffalo Bisons. Ward struck out two in the 5–0 victory. He is currently then only player-manager to have thrown a perfect game.

==== No-hitters ====
- Larry Corcoran (CHI):
  - Corcoran threw his first career no-hitter and the first no-hitter in franchise history, by defeating the Boston Red Caps 6–0 on August 19.
- Pud Galvin (BUF):
  - Galvin threw his first career no-hitter and the first no-hitter in franchise history, by defeating the Worcester Worcesters 1–0 on August 20.

=== Miscellaneous ===
- Chicago White Stockings:
  - Set a Major League record for largest winning streak, winning 21 games from June 2, and ending following their July 10 loss to the Cleveland Blues.

== Venues ==
The National League saw two teams join for the 1880 season:

- The Cincinnati Stars played at the Bank Street Grounds.
- The Worcester Worcesters played at the Agricultural County Fair Grounds.

The Troy Trojans leave the Putnam Grounds (where they played their inaugural seasons) and move to the Haymakers' Grounds, where they would play for two seasons through 1881.

The Troy Trojans begin to host a few games at Riverside Park in nearby Greenbush, New York, playing on September 11.

== See also ==
- 1880 in baseball (Events, Births, Deaths)
