= Lee Richmond's perfect game =

1880 National League baseball game

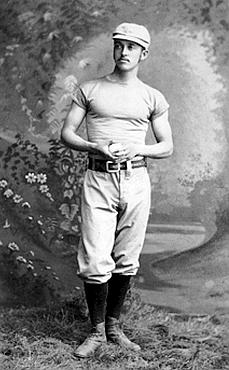
- Richmond, depicted circa 1879–1886
Cleveland Blues	Worcester Worcesters
0	1
	1	2	3	4	5	6	7	8	9	R	H	E
Cleveland Blues	0	0	0	0	0	0	0	0	0	0	0	2
Worcester Worcesters	0	0	0	0	1	0	0	0	x	1	3	0
- Date: June 12, 1880
- Venue: Worcester County Agricultural Fairgrounds
- City: Worcester, Massachusetts
- Managers: Jim McCormick (Cleveland Blues); Frank Bancroft (Worcester Worcesters)
- Attendance: 700

On June 12, 1880, Lee Richmond of the Worcester Worcesters threw a perfect game against the Cleveland Blues at Worcester County Agricultural Fairgrounds. It was the first perfect game in Major League Baseball history, which at the time only consisted of the National League.

Richmond joined the Worcesters in 1879, and quickly brought legitimacy to the team with his pitching abilities. The day before his perfect game, Richmond attended graduation festivities at Brown University. After celebrating through the night, he participated in a class baseball game in the morning and only slept for a few hours before pitching his perfect game. Of the 27 batters he faced, the at bat that posed the greatest threat to breaking up the perfect game came in the fifth inning. Blues batter Bill Phillips hit what looked to be a single, but Worcesters right fielder Lon Knight fielded the ball and threw to first baseman Chub Sullivan to record the out.

The concept of a perfect game did not exist in 1880, and thus there was little discussion of Richmond's accomplishment. Newspapers primarily focused on the lack of errors in the game. Richmond retired from baseball in 1886, and practiced as a physician for several years before pursuing a career in education in Toledo, Ohio. The legitimacy of both Richmond's and John Montgomery Ward's perfect game when compared to other MLB perfect games is the occasional subject of debate among sportswriters. The main criticism of their accomplishments is that the rules of baseball in 1880 greatly differed from modern day rules. Although MLB.com does include Richmond and Ward in their list of MLB perfect games, some sportswriters exclude them, and instead describe their perfect games as pioneering accomplishments.

== Background ==
=== Perfect game ===
In baseball, a perfect game occurs when one or more pitchers for one team complete a full game with no batter from the opposing team reaching base. In baseball leagues that feature nine-inning games like Major League Baseball (MLB), this means the pitchers involved must record an out against 27 consecutive batters, without allowing any hits, walks, hit batsmen, uncaught third strikes, catcher's or fielder's interference, or fielding errors. It is widely considered by sportswriters to be the hardest single-game accomplishment in the sport, as it requires an incredible pitching performance, defensive support, and immense luck to pull off. From 1876 to 2024, there were over 238,500 games officially recognized by MLB; only 24 were perfect games.

=== Lee Richmond ===
In 1879, Brown University student Lee Richmond joined the Worcester Worcesters (Note: Some modern sources refer to the team as the Worcester Brown Stockings or the Worcester Ruby Legs, although no contemporary sources verify these nicknames. At this time, it was standard practice for teams that did not have an official nickname to be referred to as the pluralized version of their home city.) of the National Association. Richmond quickly brought legitimacy the Worcesters with his pitching abilities, including a seven-inning no-hitter in against the Chicago White Stockings and a nine-inning no-hitter against a team from Springfield, Massachusetts. The Worcesters became such a popular team, that in 1880 they were admitted into the more prestigious National League despite the city of Worcester having a smaller population than what the league would usually require. According to The Toledo Blade, Richmond signed a record setting $2,400 contract. Richmond opted to waive his final year of baseball eligibility at Brown University, and pitched in games that would not interfere with his schoolwork. In 1880, Richmond started 66 out of Worcester's 83 games, and had a win–loss record of 32–32.

== The game ==
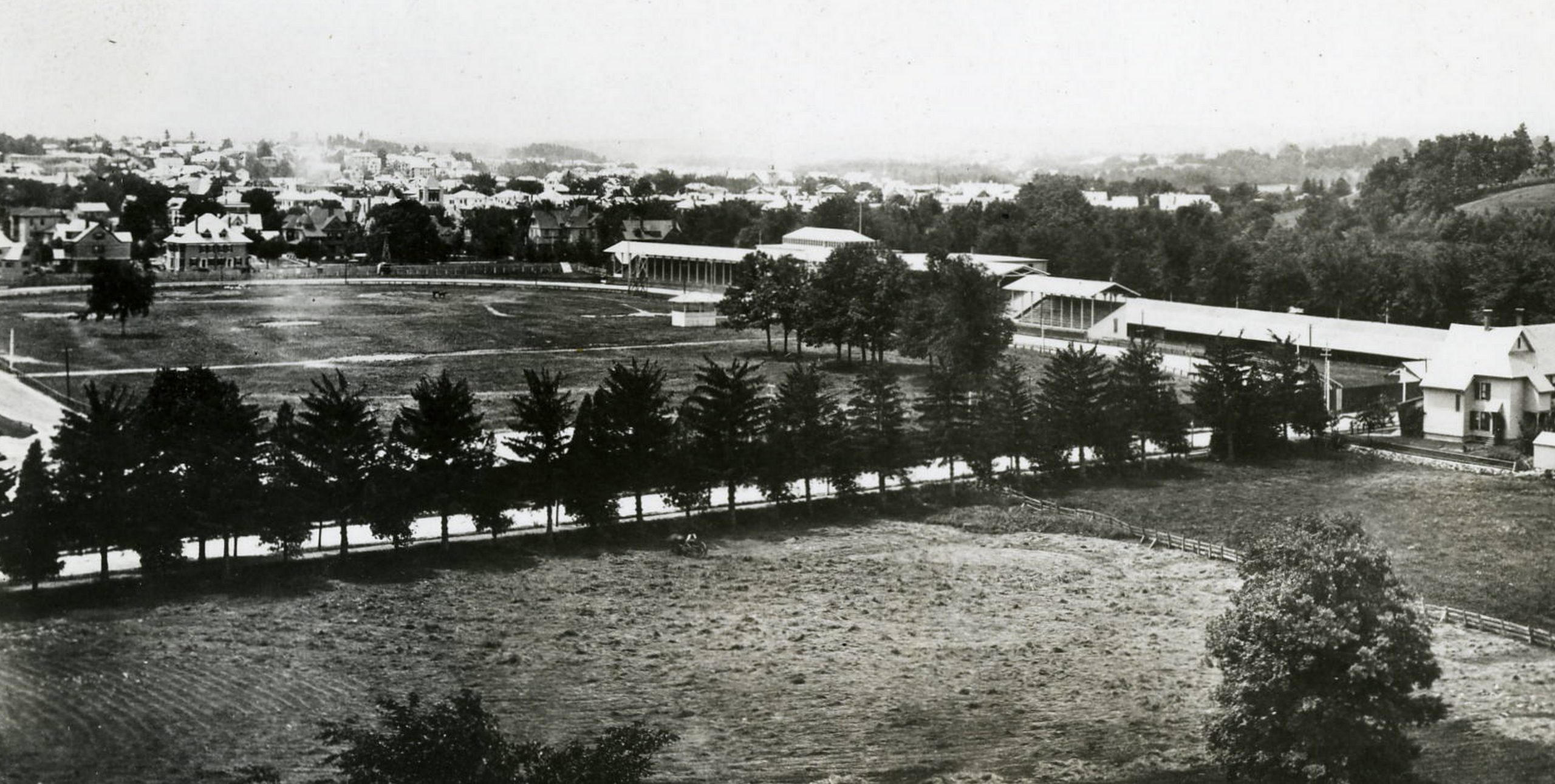
Worcester County Agricultural Fairgrounds, the site of Richmond's perfect game

Richmond's perfect game occurred on June 12, 1880. The Worcesters were playing the Cleveland Blues at Worcester County Agricultural Fairgrounds in Worcester, Massachusetts. The day before, Richmond traveled from Worcester to Brown University in Providence, Rhode Island, to attend graduation festivities. After celebrating through the night, he participated in a class baseball game, and went to sleep early in the morning. He woke up shortly before noon, and after his train was delayed, he arrived at Worcester County Agricultural Fairgrounds with no time to warm up or eat a meal.

Both Richmond and his opposition Jim McCormick pitched well. McCormick pitched eight innings and allowed one unearned run which came in the fifth inning. Worcesters' shortstop Arthur Irwin led off the inning with a single, and catcher Charlie Bennett drew a walk. Third baseman Art Whitney then hit a ground ball that resulted in two errors from Blues second baseman Fred Dunlap, which allowed Irwin to score the only run of the game.

Richmond relied heavily on his curveball throughout the game but also threw a rising fastball and changeup. Of the 27 batters he faced, two hit into foul bound outs, an antiquated rule in which a fielder could catch a foul ball on one bounce to record an out. In the fifth inning, Blues batter Bill Phillips nearly broke up the perfect game with what looked to be a single, but Worcesters right fielder Lon Knight fielded the ball and threw to first baseman Chub Sullivan to record the out. In the eight inning, a rain delay stopped play for a few minutes, after which Richmond used sawdust to dry the ball and complete the game. The final batter of the game was Ned Hanlon, who hit into a routine ground out. The game was completed in 1 hour and 26 minutes, and Richmond struck out five batters.

== Aftermath ==
The concept of a perfect game did not exist in 1880, and thus there was little discussion of Richmond's accomplishment. The Worcester Evening Gazette described the game as "a wonderful shut out" and "the best baseball game on record." Newspapers also highlighted the lack of errors in the game, such as the Chicago Tribune, which wrote "the Worcesters played a perfect fielding game." Baseball historian John Thorn noted that the reason journalists focused more on the lack of errors instead of the pitching performance was because errors were more commonplace in the 19th century. "The fields were rutted and poor, and all the fielders were essentially barehanded. To have a perfectly clean game played behind you was almost as rare as a perfect game."

Richmond retired from baseball in 1886 (Note: He left baseball in 1883 to continue his studies but attempted a brief unsuccessful comeback in 1886 for the Cincinnati Red Stockings) and finished with a career win–loss record of 75–100 and a 3.06 earned run average. Richmond then practiced as a physician for several years and pursued a career in education in Toledo, Ohio. In a 1910 interview about the perfect game, Richmond said, "I can remember almost nothing except that my jump ball and my half stride ball were working splendidly and that [Charlie] Bennett and the boys behind me gave me perfect support." Richmond died on October 1, 1929, at the age of 72.

The legitimacy of both Richmond's and John Montgomery Ward's perfect game when compared to other MLB perfect games is the occasional subject of debate among sportswriters. The main criticism of their accomplishments is that the rules of baseball in 1880 greatly differed from modern day rules. Pitchers could not throw pitches above their shoulder, which often necessitated an underhanded approach to pitching. There was no pitcher's mound, so pitcher's threw from a flat surface only forty-five feet from the batter as opposed to sixty feet. Additionally, batters could request where they wanted a pitch to be thrown, and if the pitch did not land in the spot the batter requested, it would be called a ball. Although MLB.com does include Richmond and Ward in their list of MLB perfect games, some sportswriters exclude them, and instead describe their perfect games as pioneering accomplishments. In his book Perfect: The Inside Story of Baseball's Sixteen Perfect Games, author James Buckley wrote, "Richmond deserves to be first on the list of perfect games because he fulfilled the rules of the game as he knew them: under the rules of play, erase 27 men in a row without one safely reaching first base. He did that."

== Statistics ==
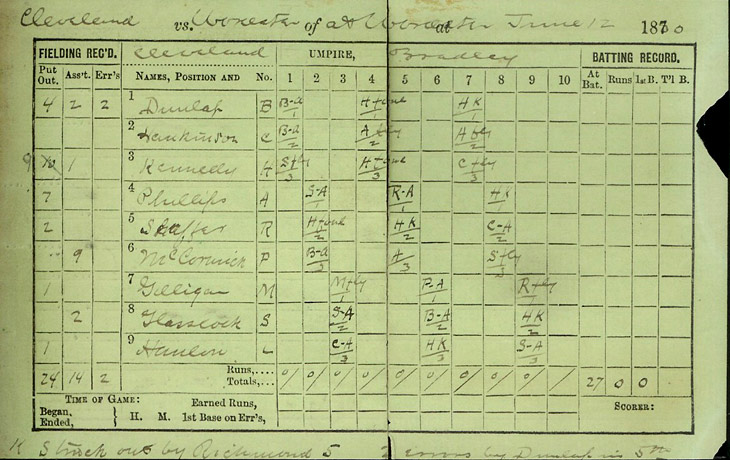
Scorecard for Richmond's perfect game

Statistics taken from Baseball Almanac

=== Line score ===
Line score for Lee Richmond's perfect game
Team	1	2	3	4	5	6	7	8	9	R	H	E
Cleveland	0	0	0	0	0	0	0	0	0	0	0	2
Worcester	0	0	0	0	1	0	0	0	x	1	3	0

=== Box score ===
Cleveland box score
Player	AB	R	H
Fred Dunlap, 2B	3	0	0
Frank Hankinson, 3B	3	0	0
Doc Kennedy, C	3	0	0
Bill Phillips, 1B	3	0	0
Orator Shafer, RF	3	0	0
Jim McCormick, P	3	0	0
Barney Gilligan, CF	3	0	0
Jack Glasscock, SS	3	0	0
Ned Hanlon, LF	3	0	0
Totals	27	0	0

Cleveland pitcher box score
Pitcher	IP	H	R	ER	BB	SO	HR
Jim McCormick	8	3	1	0	1	7	0
Totals	8	3	1	0	1	7	0

Worcester box score
Player	AB	R	H
George Wood, LF	4	0	0
Lee Richmond, P	3	0	1
Lon Knight, RF	3	0	0
Arthur Irwin, SS	3	1	2
Charlie Bennett, C	2	0	0
Art Whitney, 3B	3	0	0
Chub Sullivan, 1B	3	0	0
Fred Corey, CF	3	0	0
George Creamer, 2B	3	0	0
Totals	27	1	3

Worcester pitcher box score
Pitcher	IP	H	R	ER	BB	SO	HR
Lee Richmond	9	0	0	0	0	5	0
Totals	9	0	0	0	0	5	0
