= 1880 Troy Trojans season =

1880 Troy Trojans
- League: National League
- Ballpark: Haymakers' Grounds
- City: Troy, New York
- Record: 41–42 (.494)
- League place: 4th
- Manager: Bob Ferguson

The 1880 Troy Trojans improved slightly from the previous season, finishing with a 41–42 record and in 4th place in the National League.

== Regular season ==
=== Season standings ===
National League
Team	W	L	Pct.	GB	Home	Road
Chicago White Stockings	67	17	.798	—	37‍–‍5	30‍–‍12
Providence Grays	52	32	.619	15	31‍–‍12	21‍–‍20
Cleveland Blues	47	37	.560	20	24‍–‍19	23‍–‍18
Troy Trojans	41	42	.494	25½	20‍–‍21	21‍–‍21
Worcester Worcesters	40	43	.482	26½	24‍–‍17	16‍–‍26
Boston Red Caps	40	44	.476	27	25‍–‍17	15‍–‍27
Buffalo Bisons	24	58	.293	42	13‍–‍28	11‍–‍30
Cincinnati Stars	21	59	.263	44	14‍–‍25	7‍–‍34

=== Record vs. opponents ===
1880 National League record Sources:
Team	BSN	BUF	CHI	CIN	CLE	PRO	TRO	WOR
Boston	—	9–3–1	3–9	7–5	5–7	5–7–1	7–5	4–8
Buffalo	3–9–1	—	1–11	5–5–2	3–9	2–10	1–11	9–3
Chicago	9–3	11–1	—	10–2–1	8–4	9–3–1	10–2	10–2
Cincinnati	5–7	5–5–2	2–10–1	—	3–9	2–10	1–10	3–8
Cleveland	7–5	9–3	4–8	9–3	—	3–9	9–3	6–6–1
Providence	7–5–1	10–2	3–9–1	10–2	9–3	—	7–5	6–6–1
Troy	5–7	11–1	2–10	10–1	3–9	5–7	—	5–7
Worcester	8–4	3–9	2–10	8–3	6–6–1	6–6–1	7–5	—

=== Roster ===
1880 Troy Trojans
Roster
Pitchers: Tim Keefe; Terry Larkin; Frank Mountain; Mickey Welch	Catchers: Bill Ahearn; Fatty Briody; Buck Ewing; James Haley; Bill Harbridge; Bill Holbert; Mike Lawlor; Joe Straub	Infielders: Dan Brouthers; Ed Caskin; Ed Cogswell; Roger Connor; Bob Ferguson; Bill Tobin	Outfielders: John Cassidy; Buttercup Dickerson; Jake Evans; Patrick Gillespie; Dick Higham	Manager: Bob Ferguson

== Player stats ==
=== Batting ===
==== Starters by position ====
Note: Pos = Position; G = Games played; AB = At bats; H = Hits; Avg. = Batting average; HR = Home runs; RBI = Runs batted in

Pos	Player	G	AB	H	Avg.	HR	RBI
C	Bill Holbert	60	212	40	.189	0	8
1B	Ed Cogswell	47	209	63	.301	0	13
2B	Bob Ferguson	82	332	87	.262	0	22
3B	Roger Connor	83	340	113	.332	3	42
SS	Ed Caskin	82	333	75	.225	0	28
OF	John Cassidy	83	352	89	.253	0	29
OF	Pete Gillespie	82	346	84	.243	2	24
OF	Jake Evans	47	180	46	.256	0	22

==== Other batters ====
Note: G = Games played; AB = At bats; H = Hits; Avg. = Batting average; HR = Home runs; RBI = Runs batted in

Player	G	AB	H	Avg.	HR	RBI
Bill Tobin	33	136	22	.162	0	8
Buttercup Dickerson	30	119	23	.193	0	10
Buck Ewing	13	45	8	.178	0	5
Bill Harbridge	9	27	10	.370	0	2
Dan Brouthers	3	12	2	.167	0	1
Joe Straub	3	12	3	.250	0	3
Mike Lawlor	4	9	1	.111	0	0
James Haley	2	7	0	.000	0	0
Dick Higham	1	5	1	.200	0	0
Bill Ahearn	1	4	1	.250	0	0
Fatty Briody	1	4	0	.000	0	0

=== Pitching ===
==== Starting pitchers ====
Note: G = Games pitched; IP = Innings pitched; W = Wins; L = Losses; ERA = Earned run average; SO = Strikeouts

Player	G	IP	W	L	ERA	SO
Mickey Welch	65	574.0	34	30	2.54	123
Tim Keefe	12	105.0	6	6	0.86	43
Terry Larkin	5	38.0	0	5	8.76	5
Frank Mountain	2	17.0	1	1	5.29	2

==== Relief pitchers ====
Note: G = Games pitched; W = Wins; L = Losses; SV = Saves; ERA = Earned run average; SO = Strikeouts

Player	G	W	L	SV	ERA	SO
Jake Evans	1	0	0	0	13.50	0
