= Mendelssohn (surname) =

The surname מענדעלסאן (original yiddish: '׳מענדעלזאן) is transliterated to English as Mendelssohn, Mendelsson, Mendelson, or Mandelson. It is a common Polish/German Jewish surname. The variant spellings are used interchangeably, often even within a single family.

The name means son of Mendel ("Mendel's son"), or son of Menachem, as Mendel is a Yiddish diminutive of the Hebrew given name Menahem. Hebrew: מנחם Menachem itself means "consoling" or "one who consoles".

== People ==
=== Mendelssohn ===
the Mendelssohn family starting with Jewish philosopher Moses Mendelssohn (1729–1786), a significant figure in the Age of Enlightenment in Germany, and his descendants:

- Joseph Mendelssohn (1770–1848), German Jewish banker, son of Moses, founder of Mendelssohn & Co.
- Abraham Mendelssohn Bartholdy (1776–1835), German Jewish banker, son of Moses, father of Fanny and Felix
- Brendel Mendelssohn (1763–1839), daughter of Moses, married (i) Simon Veit, (ii) Friedrich Schlegel
- Fanny Mendelssohn (1805–1847), noted early Romantic composer and pianist, daughter of Abraham
- Felix Mendelssohn Bartholdy (1809–1847), noted early Romantic composer, son of Abraham
- Rebecka Mendelssohn (1811–1858), daughter of Abraham, married Lejeune Dirichlet, German mathematician
- Paul Mendelssohn Bartholdy (1841–1880), German chemist, son of Felix
- Arnold Mendelssohn (1855–1933), great-grandson of Moses, composer and music teacher

Others

- Anna Mendelssohn (1948–2009), British political activist and poet
- Felix Bartholdy Mendelssohn (1911–1952), British band leader
- George Mendelssohn-Bartholdy, founder of Vox Records label in 1945
- Heinrich Mendelssohn (1881–1959), German building tycoon
- Kurt Mendelssohn (1906–1980), German-born British medical physicist
- Vladimir Mendelssohn (1949–2021), Dutch-Romanian composer, violist, and professor

=== Mendelsohn ===
- Paul Benjamin Mendelsohn (born 1969), Australian actor and musician
- Carol Mendelsohn (born 1951), Canadian-Am. TV writer
- Carolyn Mendelsohn, English portrait photographer
- Daniel Mendelsohn (born 1960), American author and classics scholar
- Erich Mendelsohn (1887–1953), Am./British-Prussian architect
- Everett Mendelsohn (1931–2023), American historian
- Fred Mendelsohn (1917–2000), US promoter of black gospel music, president of Savoy Records
- Jonathan Mendelsohn, Baron (born 1966), British lobbyist and Labour political organiser
- Matthew Mendelsohn (birthdate unknown), Canadian civil servant
- Nathan Mendelsohn (1917–2006), Canadian mathematician
- Nicola Mendelsohn (born 1971), British advertising executive
- Robert Mendelsohn (disambiguation), multiple people

=== Mendelson ===
- Curtis Lester Mendelson (1913–2002), American cardiologist who first described pneumonia called Mendelson's syndrome
- Elliott Mendelson (1931–2020), American logician, known for the Mendelson axiom schemata for propositional Logic
- Mira Mendelson (1914–1968), Russian poet, second wife of Sergei Prokofiev
- Paul Mendelson, British scriptwriter for television, film and radio
- Phil Mendelson (born 1952), Washington, D.C., politician
- Shari Mendelson (born 1961), American sculptor

=== Other spellings ===
- Ben Mandelson (born 1953), English world musician
- Peter Mandelson (born 1953), British Labour politician
- Nathan Menderson (1820–1904), German-born American business/baseball executive

== See also ==
- Mandel, surname list
- Mandelson (surname)
- Menderson
- Menachem Mendel, name list
- Mendelssohn (disambiguation)
