= Menderson =

Menderson is a surname. Notable people with the surname include:

- Charles M. Menderson, American politician, member of the 13th and 14th Arizona State Legislatures
- Nathan Menderson (1820–1904), German-born American business executive and baseball executive

== See also ==
- Mendelssohn (surname)
