= 1880 in baseball =

The following are the baseball events of the year 1880 throughout the world.

== Champions ==
- National League: Chicago White Stockings
- National Association: Washington Nationals

Inter-league playoff: Washington (NA) defeat Chicago (NL), 4 games to 3 (1 tie game)

== Statistical leaders ==
National League
Stat	Player	Total
AVG	George Gore (CHI)	.360
HR	Jim O'Rourke (BSN); Harry Stovey (WOR)	6
RBI	Cap Anson (CHI)	74
W	Jim McCormick (CLE)	45
ERA	Tim Keefe (TRO)	0.86
K	Larry Corcoran (CHI)	268

== National League final standings ==
National League
Team	W	L	Pct.	GB	Home	Road
Chicago White Stockings	67	17	.798	—	37‍–‍5	30‍–‍12
Providence Grays	52	32	.619	15	31‍–‍12	21‍–‍20
Cleveland Blues	47	37	.560	20	24‍–‍19	23‍–‍18
Troy Trojans	41	42	.494	25½	20‍–‍21	21‍–‍21
Worcester Worcesters	40	43	.482	26½	24‍–‍17	16‍–‍26
Boston Red Caps	40	44	.476	27	25‍–‍17	15‍–‍27
Buffalo Bisons	24	58	.293	42	13‍–‍28	11‍–‍30
Cincinnati Stars	21	59	.263	44	14‍–‍25	7‍–‍34

Locations of teams for the 1880 National League season
National League

== Events ==
=== January–March ===
- February 5 – The Worcester Worcesters are admitted to the National League.
- March 31 – The Worcester Worcesters offer the Providence Grays $1,000 for negotiating rights with Providence player-manager George Wright. The Grays refuse the offer and Wright remains the reserved property of Providence.

=== April–June ===
- April 21 – George Wright turns down the Providence Grays final contract offer. As a reserved player obligated to Providence, Wright has no other option but to sit out the season (although he does mysteriously appear in 1 game on May 29 for the Boston Red Caps).
- April 28 – Lew Brown, catcher for the Boston Red Caps, arrives drunk for an exhibition game and is suspended for the entire season by the Red Caps.
- May 1
  - The Cincinnati Stars make their major league debut with a 4–3 loss to the Chicago White Stockings at Bank Street Grounds.
  - Roger Connor and Mickey Welch make their debuts for the Troy Trojans. Troy loses 13–1 to the Worcester Worcesters, who win their first National League game.
  - Ned Hanlon makes his debut for the Cleveland Blues in a losing effort. Hanlon will be elected to the Hall-of-Fame in 1996.
- May 5 – Charley "Old Hoss" Radbourn debuts for the Providence Grays.
- May 20 – Chicago White Stockings manager Cap Anson begins alternating Larry Corcoran and Fred Goldsmith to form the first pitching rotation in major league history.
- May 29 – The Chicago White Stockings set a National League record by winning their 13th consecutive game, a record they will shatter in 4 weeks.
  - George Wright is acquired by the Boston Red Stockings from the Providence Grays.
- June 10 – 1879 home run champ Charley Jones of the Boston Red Caps becomes the first player to hit 2 homers in one inning in a Boston victory over the Buffalo Bisons.
- June 12 – Lee Richmond of the Worcester Worcesters pitches the first perfect game in professional history in a 1–0 victory over the Cleveland Blues.
- June 17 – John Montgomery Ward of the Providence Grays pitches the 2nd perfect game in 6 days as the Grays defeat Pud Galvin and the Buffalo Bisons 5–0. The National League would not see another perfect game until 1964.

=== July–September ===
- July 8 – The Chicago White Stockings win their 21st consecutive game. This record will stand until 1916 when it is broken by the New York Giants. It still stands as the 2nd longest winning streak in major league history.
- July 11 – The Chicago Tribune publishes runs batted in for the first time.
- July 17 – Harry Stovey of the Worcester Worcesters hits his first big league home run. Stovey will become the first player in history to reach 100 career home runs.
- August 6 – Tim Keefe makes his major league debut with the Troy Trojans, pitching a 4-hitter in defeating the Cincinnati Stars. Keefe will end up with 342 career wins and be elected to the Hall of Fame in 1964.
- August 19 – Larry Corcoran of the Chicago White Stockings pitches a no-hitter against the Boston Red Caps.
- August 20 – Pud Galvin pitches a no-hitter for the Buffalo Bisons against the Worcester Worcesters. It is the 2nd day in a row that the National League has seen a no-hitter.
- August 27 – Bill Crowley of the Buffalo Bisons records 4 assists from the outfield for the second time this season, having done it previously on May 24. Crowley remains the only outfielder to ever have 4 assists in one game on two separate occasions.
- September 1 – Charley Jones of the Boston Red Caps refuses to play after the club fails to pay him $378 in back pay. The team responds by suspending, fining and black-listing him. Jones will never again play in the National League, although he will appear again beginning in 1883 in the American Association.
- September 2 – The first night game is played in Nantasket Beach, Massachusetts. The Jordan Marsh and R. H. White department stores from Boston play to a 16–16 tie.
- September 8 – The Polo Grounds in New York City are leased by a new Metropolitan team being led by Jim Mutrie.
- September 9 – Buck Ewing makes his debut for the Troy Trojans.
- September 15
  - John O'Rourke, older brother of Jim O'Rourke, becomes the first player to hit 4 doubles in one game.
  - The Chicago White Stockings clinch the pennant with a 5–2 win over the Cincinnati Stars.
- September 29 – The Polo Grounds hosts its first baseball game as the newly formed New York Metropolitans defeat the National Association champion Washington Nationals 4–2. Approximately 2,500 people attend the game, the largest crowd to see a game in New York City in several years.
- September 30 – The last place Cincinnati Stars win their final game 2–0 in front of 183 fans. This will be the last game for this troubled franchise, although the city will see the current version of the Reds begin play in 1882.

=== October–December ===
- October 4 – The National League prohibits the sale of alcoholic beverages in member parks and also prohibits member parks from being rented out on Sundays. These rulings are directly aimed at the Cincinnati Stars club who routinely did both in order to raise additional money for their continual struggling finances.
- October 6 – The Cincinnati Stars refuse to abide by the new rules set down and are immediately kicked out of the National League.
- December 8 – The National League rejects the Washington Nationals bid for membership and accepts the Detroit Wolverines as its newest member.
- December 9 – The National League re-elects William Hulbert as president and adopts several new rules for 1881. Among the new rules are reducing called balls for a walk down to 7 and moving the pitching box back 5 feet to the new distance of 50 feet.

== Births ==
=== January–April ===
- January 5 – Dutch Jordan
- January 13 – Goat Anderson
- January 21 – Emil Batch
- January 22 – Bill O'Neill
- January 23 – Julián Castillo
- January 27 – Bill Burns
- February 6 – Frank LaPorte
- February 7 – Dave Williams
- February 14 – Claude Berry
- February 16 – Carl Lundgren
- March 2 – Danny Hoffman
- March 10 – Judge Nagle
- March 22 – Ernie Quigley
- April 12 – Addie Joss
- April 18 – Sam Crawford
- April 20 – Charlie Smith

=== May–August ===
- May 7 – Mickey Doolan
- June 12 – Matty McIntyre
- June 30 – Davy Jones
- July 4 – George Mullin
- July 14 – Ed Hug
- July 22 – George Gibson
- July 27
  - Jack Doscher
  - Irish McIlveen
  - Joe Tinker
- July 29 – Chief Meyers
- August 12 – Christy Mathewson
- August 30 – Charlie Armbruster

=== September–December ===
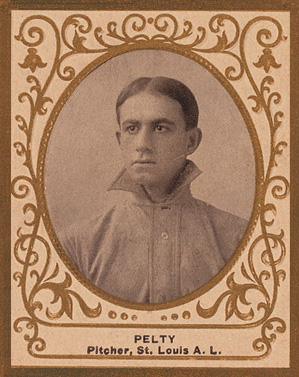
Barney Pelty

- September 10
  - Harry Niles
  - Barney Pelty
- September 12 – Boss Schmidt
- September 23 – Heinie Wagner
- September 29 – Harry Lumley
- October 3 – Henry Thielman
- October 12 – Pete Hill
- October 21 – Jack Hayden
- October 25
  - Weldon Henley
  - Bill Brennan
- November 20 – George McBride
- November 21 – Simmy Murch
- November 25 – Frank Corridon
- December 2 – Tom Doran
- December 17 – Cy Falkenberg
- December 23 – Doc Gessler

== Deaths ==
- November 23 – Jack McDonald, 36?, right fielder who hit .258 with the 1872 Brooklyn Atlantics.
