= Joe Straub =

American baseball player (1858–1929)

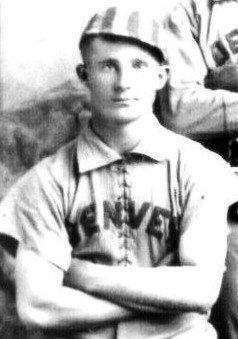
- Catcher
- Born: January 19, 1858; Germany
- Died: February 13, 1929 (aged 71); Pueblo, Colorado, U.S.
- Batted: Right Threw: Right

MLB debut
- June 24, 1880, for the Troy Trojans

Last MLB appearance
- September 22, 1883, for the Columbus Buckeyes

MLB statistics
- Batting average: .153
- Hits: 22
- Runs batted in: 4
- Stats at Baseball Reference

Teams
- Troy Trojans (1880); Philadelphia Athletics (1882); Columbus Buckeyes (1883)

Joseph J. Straub (January 19, 1858 – February 13, 1929) was a German born Major League Baseball catcher who played three seasons in the majors during the 19th century.

Straub had a weak throwing arm which caused Philadelphia to release him.
