= James Haley (baseball) =

American baseball player

- Catcher
- Batted: Unknown Threw: Right

MLB debut
- June 22, 1880, for the Troy Trojans

Last MLB appearance
- July 23, 1880, for the Troy Trojans

MLB statistics
- Games played: 2
- At bats: 7
- Hits: 0
- Stats at Baseball Reference

Teams
- Troy Trojans (1880)

James Haley (formerly believed to be Fred Haley) was a professional baseball catcher. Haley played in Major League Baseball for the Troy Trojans in 1880. In 2 games for the Trojans, Haley went hitless in 7 at bats.
