= 1880 Chicago White Stockings season =

1880 Chicago White Stockings
- National League champions
- League: National League
- Ballpark: Lakefront Park
- City: Chicago
- Record: 67–17 (.798)
- League place: 1st
- Owner: William Hulbert
- Manager: Cap Anson

The 1880 Chicago White Stockings season was the ninth season of the Chicago White Stockings franchise, the fifth in the National League and the third at Lakefront Park. The White Stockings won the National League championship with a record of 67–17.

== Regular season ==
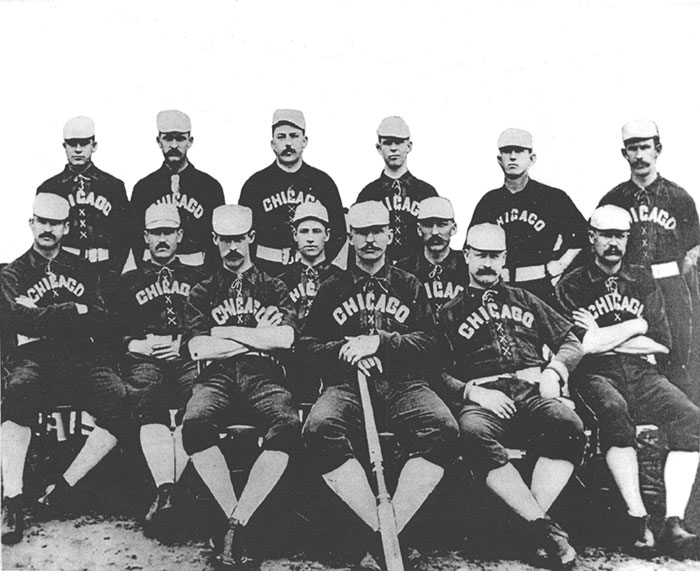
The 1880 Chicago White Stockings

=== Season standings ===
National League
| Team | W | L | Pct. | GB | Home | Road |
|---|---|---|---|---|---|---|
| Chicago White Stockings | 67 | 17 | .798 | — | 37‍–‍5 | 30‍–‍12 |
| Providence Grays | 52 | 32 | .619 | 15 | 31‍–‍12 | 21‍–‍20 |
| Cleveland Blues | 47 | 37 | .560 | 20 | 24‍–‍19 | 23‍–‍18 |
| Troy Trojans | 41 | 42 | .494 | 25½ | 20‍–‍21 | 21‍–‍21 |
| Worcester Worcesters | 40 | 43 | .482 | 26½ | 24‍–‍17 | 16‍–‍26 |
| Boston Red Caps | 40 | 44 | .476 | 27 | 25‍–‍17 | 15‍–‍27 |
| Buffalo Bisons | 24 | 58 | .293 | 42 | 13‍–‍28 | 11‍–‍30 |
| Cincinnati Stars | 21 | 59 | .263 | 44 | 14‍–‍25 | 7‍–‍34 |

=== Record vs. opponents ===
1880 National League record Sources:
| Team | BSN | BUF | CHI | CIN | CLE | PRO | TRO | WOR |
|---|---|---|---|---|---|---|---|---|
| Boston | — | 9–3–1 | 3–9 | 7–5 | 5–7 | 5–7–1 | 7–5 | 4–8 |
| Buffalo | 3–9–1 | — | 1–11 | 5–5–2 | 3–9 | 2–10 | 1–11 | 9–3 |
| Chicago | 9–3 | 11–1 | — | 10–2–1 | 8–4 | 9–3–1 | 10–2 | 10–2 |
| Cincinnati | 5–7 | 5–5–2 | 2–10–1 | — | 3–9 | 2–10 | 1–10 | 3–8 |
| Cleveland | 7–5 | 9–3 | 4–8 | 9–3 | — | 3–9 | 9–3 | 6–6–1 |
| Providence | 7–5–1 | 10–2 | 3–9–1 | 10–2 | 9–3 | — | 7–5 | 6–6–1 |
| Troy | 5–7 | 11–1 | 2–10 | 10–1 | 3–9 | 5–7 | — | 5–7 |
| Worcester | 8–4 | 3–9 | 2–10 | 8–3 | 6–6–1 | 6–6–1 | 7–5 | — |

== Roster ==
1880 Chicago White Stockings
Roster
| Pitchers: Larry Corcoran; Fred Goldsmith; Charlie Guth; Catchers: Silver Flint | Infielders: Cap Anson; Tom Burns; Joe Quest; Ned Williamson | Outfielders: Tommy Beals; Abner Dalrymple; George Gore; King Kelly; Tom Poorman | Manager: Cap Anson |

== Player stats ==
=== Batting ===
==== Starters by position ====
Note: Pos = Position; G = Games played; AB = At bats; H = Hits; Avg. = Batting average; HR = Home runs; RBI = Runs batted in

| Pos | Player | G | AB | H | Avg. | HR | RBI |
|---|---|---|---|---|---|---|---|
| C | Silver Flint | 74 | 284 | 46 | .162 | 0 | 17 |
| 1B | Cap Anson | 86 | 356 | 120 | .337 | 1 | 74 |
| 2B | Joe Quest | 82 | 300 | 71 | .237 | 0 | 27 |
| 3B | Ned Williamson | 75 | 311 | 78 | .251 | 0 | 31 |
| SS | Tom Burns | 85 | 333 | 103 | .309 | 0 | 43 |
| OF | Abner Dalrymple | 86 | 382 | 126 | .330 | 0 | 36 |
| OF | George Gore | 77 | 322 | 116 | .360 | 2 | 47 |
| OF | King Kelly | 84 | 344 | 100 | .291 | 1 | 60 |

==== Other batters ====
Note: G = Games played; AB = At bats; H = Hits; Avg. = Batting average; HR = Home runs; RBI = Runs batted in

| Player | G | AB | H | Avg. | HR | RBI |
|---|---|---|---|---|---|---|
| Tommy Beals | 13 | 46 | 7 | .152 | 0 | 3 |
| Tom Poorman | 7 | 25 | 5 | .200 | 0 | 0 |

=== Pitching ===
==== Starting pitchers ====
Note: G = Games pitched; IP = Innings pitched; W = Wins; L = Losses; ERA = Earned run average; SO = Strikeouts

| Player | G | IP | W | L | ERA | SO |
|---|---|---|---|---|---|---|
| Larry Corcoran | 63 | 536.1 | 43 | 14 | 1.95 | 268 |
| Fred Goldsmith | 26 | 210.1 | 21 | 3 | 1.75 | 90 |
| Charlie Guth | 1 | 9.0 | 1 | 0 | 5.00 | 7 |

==== Other pitchers ====
Note: G = Games pitched; IP = Innings pitched; W = Wins; L = Losses; ERA = Earned run average; SO = Strikeouts

| Player | G | IP | W | L | ERA | SO |
|---|---|---|---|---|---|---|
| Tom Poorman | 2 | 15.0 | 2 | 0 | 2.40 | 0 |

==== Relief pitchers ====
Note: G = Games pitched; W = Wins; L = Losses; SV = Saves; ERA = Earned run average; SO = Strikeouts

| Player | G | W | L | SV | ERA | SO |
|---|---|---|---|---|---|---|
| King Kelly | 1 | 0 | 0 | 0 | 0.00 | 1 |
| Tom Burns | 1 | 0 | 0 | 0 | 0.00 | 1 |

== See also ==
- List of Major League Baseball longest winning streaks
