= 1880 Cincinnati Stars season =

1880 Cincinnati Stars
- League: National League
- Ballpark: Bank Street Grounds
- City: Cincinnati, Ohio
- Record: 21–59 (.263)
- League place: 8th
- Owner: Justus Thorner
- Manager: John Clapp

The 1880 Cincinnati Stars season was the first and only season for the Cincinnati Stars, a professional baseball franchise competing in the National League (NL). The club replaced the defunct Cincinnati Reds that had competed in the NL during 1876–1879. The Stars finished last in the eight-team NL with a record of 21–59, 44 games behind the Chicago White Stockings.

Team president Justus Thorner resigned in early July, with vice-president Nathan Menderson selected as his successor. At the end of the season, the team was kicked out of the league for their refusal to stop selling beer and renting out their park on Sundays. A new Cincinnati Reds franchise joined the American Association two years later.

== Regular season ==
During the off-season, Cincinnati signed catcher John Clapp, who had played with the Buffalo Bisons in the previous season. Clapp was also named the manager of the team. Deacon White, who was the Reds catcher in 1878 and 1879, moved to the outfield. Other off-season signings included Hick Carpenter of the Syracuse Stars to play third base, while the Stars had rookies at first base, John Reilly, and second base, Pop Smith.

Clapp and Blondie Purcell led the team offensively, as Clapp had a .282 average with a homer and 20 RBI and 33 runs scored, while Purcell hit .292 with a homer and 24 RBI, along with 48 runs. Will White led the NL with 42 losses; however, he had a good ERA of 2.14.

Cincinnati got off to a miserable start, having a record of only 6–26 in their first 32 games, which included lopsided losses of 20–7 and 15–1 to the White Stockings, and 13–0 to the Worcester Worcesters during that span. Cincinnati never got it together during the season, and finished in last place in their only season, 44 games behind the first place White Stockings.

=== Season standings ===
National League
Team	W	L	Pct.	GB	Home	Road
Chicago White Stockings	67	17	.798	—	37‍–‍5	30‍–‍12
Providence Grays	52	32	.619	15	31‍–‍12	21‍–‍20
Cleveland Blues	47	37	.560	20	24‍–‍19	23‍–‍18
Troy Trojans	41	42	.494	25½	20‍–‍21	21‍–‍21
Worcester Worcesters	40	43	.482	26½	24‍–‍17	16‍–‍26
Boston Red Caps	40	44	.476	27	25‍–‍17	15‍–‍27
Buffalo Bisons	24	58	.293	42	13‍–‍28	11‍–‍30
Cincinnati Stars	21	59	.263	44	14‍–‍25	7‍–‍34

=== Record vs. opponents ===
1880 National League record Sources:
Team	BOS	BUF	CHI	CIN	CLE	PRV	TRO	WOR
Boston	—	9–3–1	3–9	7–5	5–7	5–7–1	7–5	4–8
Buffalo	3–9–1	—	1–11	5–5–2	3–9	2–10	1–11	9–3
Chicago	9–3	11–1	—	10–2–1	8–4	9–3–1	10–2	10–2
Cincinnati	5–7	5–5–2	2–10–1	—	3–9	2–10	1–10	3–8
Cleveland	7–5	9–3	4–8	9–3	—	3–9	9–3	6–6–1
Providence	7–5–1	10–2	3–9–1	10–2	9–3	—	7–5	6–6–1
Troy	5–7	11–1	2–10	10–1	3–9	5–7	—	5–7
Worcester	8–4	3–9	2–10	8–3	6–6–1	6–6–1	7–5	—

=== Roster ===
1880 Cincinnati Stars
Roster
Pitchers: Will White; Catchers: John Clapp	Infielders: Amos Booth; Hick Carpenter; Andy Leonard; John Reilly; Lou Say; Pop Smith; Sam Wright	Outfielders: Jack Manning; Mike Mansell; Blondie Purcell; Charlie Reilley; Joe Sommer; Harry Wheeler; Deacon White	Manager: John Clapp

== Player stats ==
=== Batting ===
==== Starters by position ====
Note: Pos = Position; G = Games played; AB = At bats; H = Hits; Avg. = Batting average; HR = Home runs; RBI = Runs batted in

Pos	Player	G	AB	H	Avg.	HR	RBI
C	John Clapp	80	323	91	.282	1	20
1B	John Reilly	73	272	56	.206	0	16
2B	Pop Smith	83	334	69	.207	0	27
3B	Hick Carpenter	77	300	72	.240	0	23
SS	Lou Say	48	191	38	.199	0	15
OF	Blondie Purcell	77	325	95	.292	1	24
OF	Mike Mansell	53	187	36	.193	2	12
OF	Jack Manning	48	190	41	.216	2	17

==== Other batters ====
Note: G = Games played; AB = At bats; H = Hits; Avg. = Batting average; HR = Home runs; RBI = Runs batted in

Player	G	AB	H	Avg.	HR	RBI
Deacon White	35	141	42	.298	0	7
Andy Leonard	33	133	28	.211	1	17
Charlie Reilley	30	103	21	.204	0	9
Joe Sommer	24	88	16	.182	0	6
Harry Wheeler	17	65	6	.092	0	2
Sam Wright	9	34	3	.088	0	0
Amos Booth	1	2	0	.000	0	0

=== Pitching ===
==== Starting pitchers ====
Note: G = Games pitched; IP = Innings pitched; W = Wins; L = Losses; ERA = Earned run average; SO = Strikeouts

Player	G	IP	W	L	ERA	SO
Will White	62	517.1	18	42	2.14	161
Blondie Purcell	25	196.0	3	17	3.21	47
