= 1880 Cleveland Blues season =

1880 Cleveland Blues
- League: National League
- Ballpark: Kennard Street Park
- City: Cleveland, Ohio
- Record: 47–37 (.560)
- League place: 3rd
- Manager: Jim McCormick

The 1880 Cleveland Blues finished the season at 47–37, good enough for a third-place finish in the National League.

== Regular season ==
=== Season standings ===
National League
| Team | W | L | Pct. | GB | Home | Road |
|---|---|---|---|---|---|---|
| Chicago White Stockings | 67 | 17 | .798 | — | 37‍–‍5 | 30‍–‍12 |
| Providence Grays | 52 | 32 | .619 | 15 | 31‍–‍12 | 21‍–‍20 |
| Cleveland Blues | 47 | 37 | .560 | 20 | 24‍–‍19 | 23‍–‍18 |
| Troy Trojans | 41 | 42 | .494 | 25½ | 20‍–‍21 | 21‍–‍21 |
| Worcester Worcesters | 40 | 43 | .482 | 26½ | 24‍–‍17 | 16‍–‍26 |
| Boston Red Caps | 40 | 44 | .476 | 27 | 25‍–‍17 | 15‍–‍27 |
| Buffalo Bisons | 24 | 58 | .293 | 42 | 13‍–‍28 | 11‍–‍30 |
| Cincinnati Stars | 21 | 59 | .263 | 44 | 14‍–‍25 | 7‍–‍34 |

=== Record vs. opponents ===
1880 National League record Sources:
| Team | BSN | BUF | CHI | CIN | CLE | PRO | TRO | WOR |
|---|---|---|---|---|---|---|---|---|
| Boston | — | 9–3–1 | 3–9 | 7–5 | 5–7 | 5–7–1 | 7–5 | 4–8 |
| Buffalo | 3–9–1 | — | 1–11 | 5–5–2 | 3–9 | 2–10 | 1–11 | 9–3 |
| Chicago | 9–3 | 11–1 | — | 10–2–1 | 8–4 | 9–3–1 | 10–2 | 10–2 |
| Cincinnati | 5–7 | 5–5–2 | 2–10–1 | — | 3–9 | 2–10 | 1–10 | 3–8 |
| Cleveland | 7–5 | 9–3 | 4–8 | 9–3 | — | 3–9 | 9–3 | 6–6–1 |
| Providence | 7–5–1 | 10–2 | 3–9–1 | 10–2 | 9–3 | — | 7–5 | 6–6–1 |
| Troy | 5–7 | 11–1 | 2–10 | 10–1 | 3–9 | 5–7 | — | 5–7 |
| Worcester | 8–4 | 3–9 | 2–10 | 8–3 | 6–6–1 | 6–6–1 | 7–5 | — |

=== Roster ===
1880 Cleveland Blues
Roster
| Pitchers: Gid Gardner; Jim McCormick; Catchers: Barney Gilligan; Doc Kennedy | Infielders: Fred Dunlap; Jack Glasscock; Frank Hankinson; Mike McGeary; Bill Phillips | Outfielders: Al Hall; Ned Hanlon; Pete Hotaling; Orator Shafer; Harry Wheeler | Manager: Jim McCormick |

== Player stats ==
=== Batting ===
==== Starters by position ====
Note: Pos = Position; G = Games played; AB = At bats; H = Hits; Avg. = Batting average; HR = Home runs; RBI = Runs batted in

| Pos | Player | G | AB | H | Avg. | HR | RBI |
|---|---|---|---|---|---|---|---|
| C | Doc Kennedy | 66 | 250 | 50 | .200 | 0 | 18 |
| 1B | Bill Phillips | 85 | 334 | 85 | .254 | 1 | 36 |
| 2B | Fred Dunlap | 85 | 373 | 103 | .276 | 4 | 30 |
| 3B | Frank Hankinson | 69 | 263 | 55 | .209 | 1 | 9 |
| SS | Jack Glasscock | 77 | 296 | 72 | .243 | 0 | 27 |
| OF | Orator Shafer | 83 | 338 | 90 | .266 | 0 | 21 |
| OF | Pete Hotaling | 78 | 325 | 78 | .240 | 0 | 41 |
| OF | Ned Hanlon | 73 | 280 | 69 | .246 | 0 | 32 |

==== Other batters ====
Note: G = Games played; AB = At bats; H = Hits; Avg. = Batting average; HR = Home runs; RBI = Runs batted in

| Player | G | AB | H | Avg. | HR | RBI |
|---|---|---|---|---|---|---|
| Mike McGeary | 31 | 111 | 28 | .252 | 0 | 6 |
| Barney Gilligan | 30 | 99 | 17 | .172 | 1 | 13 |
| Al Hall | 3 | 8 | 1 | .125 | 0 | 0 |
| Harry Wheeler | 1 | 4 | 1 | .250 | 0 | 0 |

=== Pitching ===
==== Starting pitchers ====
Note: G = Games pitched; IP = Innings pitched; W = Wins; L = Losses; ERA = Earned run average; SO = Strikeouts

| Player | G | IP | W | L | ERA | SO |
|---|---|---|---|---|---|---|
| Jim McCormick | 74 | 657.2 | 45 | 28 | 1.85 | 260 |
| Gid Gardner | 9 | 77.0 | 1 | 8 | 2.57 | 21 |

==== Other pitchers ====
Note: G = Games pitched; IP = Innings pitched; W = Wins; L = Losses; ERA = Earned run average; SO = Strikeouts

| Player | G | IP | W | L | ERA | SO |
|---|---|---|---|---|---|---|
| Frank Hankinson | 4 | 25.0 | 1 | 1 | 1.08 | 8 |
