= 1880 Boston Red Caps season =

1880 Boston Red Caps
- League: National League
- Ballpark: South End Grounds
- City: Boston, Massachusetts
- Record: 40–44 (.476)
- League place: 5th
- Owner: Arthur Soden
- Manager: Harry Wright

The 1880 Boston Red Caps was the tenth season of the franchise.

== Regular season ==
=== Season standings ===
National League
Team	W	L	Pct.	GB	Home	Road
Chicago White Stockings	67	17	.798	—	37‍–‍5	30‍–‍12
Providence Grays	52	32	.619	15	31‍–‍12	21‍–‍20
Cleveland Blues	47	37	.560	20	24‍–‍19	23‍–‍18
Troy Trojans	41	42	.494	25½	20‍–‍21	21‍–‍21
Worcester Worcesters	40	43	.482	26½	24‍–‍17	16‍–‍26
Boston Red Caps	40	44	.476	27	25‍–‍17	15‍–‍27
Buffalo Bisons	24	58	.293	42	13‍–‍28	11‍–‍30
Cincinnati Stars	21	59	.263	44	14‍–‍25	7‍–‍34

=== Record vs. opponents ===
1880 National League record Sources:
Team	BSN	BUF	CHI	CIN	CLE	PRO	TRO	WOR
Boston	—	9–3–1	3–9	7–5	5–7	5–7–1	7–5	4–8
Buffalo	3–9–1	—	1–11	5–5–2	3–9	2–10	1–11	9–3
Chicago	9–3	11–1	—	10–2–1	8–4	9–3–1	10–2	10–2
Cincinnati	5–7	5–5–2	2–10–1	—	3–9	2–10	1–10	3–8
Cleveland	7–5	9–3	4–8	9–3	—	3–9	9–3	6–6–1
Providence	7–5–1	10–2	3–9–1	10–2	9–3	—	7–5	6–6–1
Troy	5–7	11–1	2–10	10–1	3–9	5–7	—	5–7
Worcester	8–4	3–9	2–10	8–3	6–6–1	6–6–1	7–5	—

=== Roster ===
1880 Boston Red Caps
Roster
Pitchers: Tommy Bond; Curry Foley; Catchers: John Bergh; Phil Powers; Denny Sullivan; Sam Trott	Infielders: Jack Burdock; John Morrill; John Richmond; Ezra Sutton; George Wright	Outfielders: Steve Dignan; Sadie Houck; Charley Jones; Jack Leary; Dan O'Leary; Jim O'Rourke; John O'Rourke	Manager: Harry Wright

== Player stats ==
=== Batting ===
==== Starters by position ====
Note: Pos = Position; G = Games played; AB = At bats; H = Hits; Avg. = Batting average; HR = Home runs; RBI = Runs batted in

Pos	Player	G	AB	H	Avg.	HR	RBI
C	Phil Powers	37	126	18	.143	0	10
1B	John Morrill	86	342	81	.237	2	44
2B	Jack Burdock	86	356	90	.253	2	35
3B	Ezra Sutton	76	288	72	.250	0	25
SS	John Richmond	32	129	32	.248	0	9
OF	John O'Rourke	81	313	86	.275	3	36
OF	Charley Jones	66	280	84	.300	5	37
OF	Jim O'Rourke	86	363	100	.275	6	45

==== Other batters ====
Note: G = Games played; AB = At bats; H = Hits; Avg. = Batting average; HR = Home runs; RBI = Runs batted in

Player	G	AB	H	Avg.	HR	RBI
Curry Foley	80	332	97	.292	2	31
Sam Trott	39	125	26	.208	0	9
Sadie Houck	12	47	7	.149	0	2
John Bergh	11	40	8	.200	0	0
Steve Dignan	8	34	11	.324	0	4
Dan O'Leary	3	12	3	.250	0	1
Denny Sullivan	1	4	1	.250	0	1
George Wright	1	4	1	.250	0	0
Jack Leary	1	3	0	.000	0	0

=== Pitching ===
==== Starting pitchers ====
Note: G = Games pitched; IP = Innings pitched; W = Wins; L = Losses; ERA = Earned run average; SO = Strikeouts

Player	G	IP	W	L	ERA	SO
Tommy Bond	63	493.0	26	29	2.67	118
Curry Foley	36	238.0	14	14	3.89	68
Jack Leary	1	3.0	0	1	15.00	1

==== Relief pitchers ====
Note: G = Games pitched; W = Wins; L = Losses; SV = Saves; ERA = Earned run average; SO = Strikeouts

Player	G	W	L	SV	ERA	SO
John Morrill	3	0	0	0	0.84	0
