= Mendelssohn (disambiguation) =

Felix Mendelssohn (1809–1847) was a German composer.

Mendelssohn may also refer to:

- Mendelssohn (surname), includes a list of people with the name
- Mendelssohn (crater), a crater on Mercury
- Mendelssohn (horse), a thoroughbred racehorse
- 3954 Mendelssohn, a minor planet
- Mendelssohn & Co., a German bank in the 19th and 20th centuries
- Mendelssohn-Bartholdy-Park (Berlin U-Bahn), subway station located on the U2 line
- Mendelssohn Foundation, a German nonprofit
- Mendelssohn House, Leipzig, a museum
- Mendelssohn Scholarship, awarded in Germany and the UK

== See also ==
- G. von Mendelsohn, a typeface designer
- Mendel (disambiguation)
- Mandel, a surname
