= 1880 Providence Grays season =

1880 Providence Grays
- League: National League
- Ballpark: Messer Street Grounds
- City: Providence, Rhode Island
- Record: 52–32 (.619)
- League place: 2nd
- Owner: Henry Root
- Managers: Mike McGeary, John Montgomery Ward, Mike Dorgan

The Providence Grays finished the 1880 season in second place in the National League.

== Regular season ==
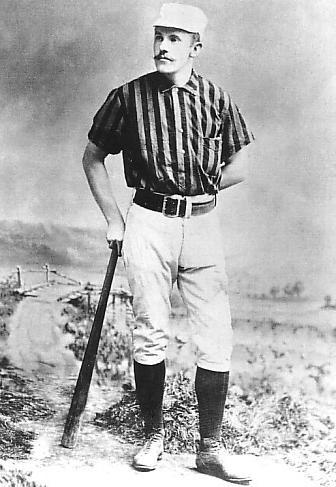
Pitcher John Montgomery Ward

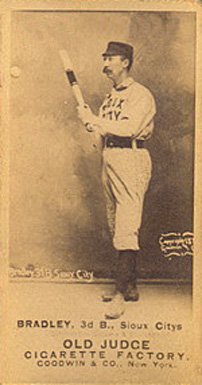
Third baseman George Bradley

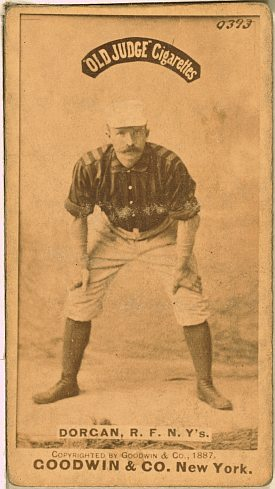
Manager / right fielder Mike Dorgan

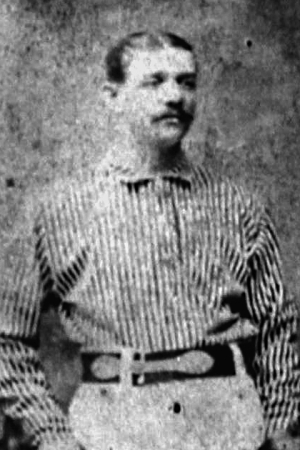
Left fielder Tom York

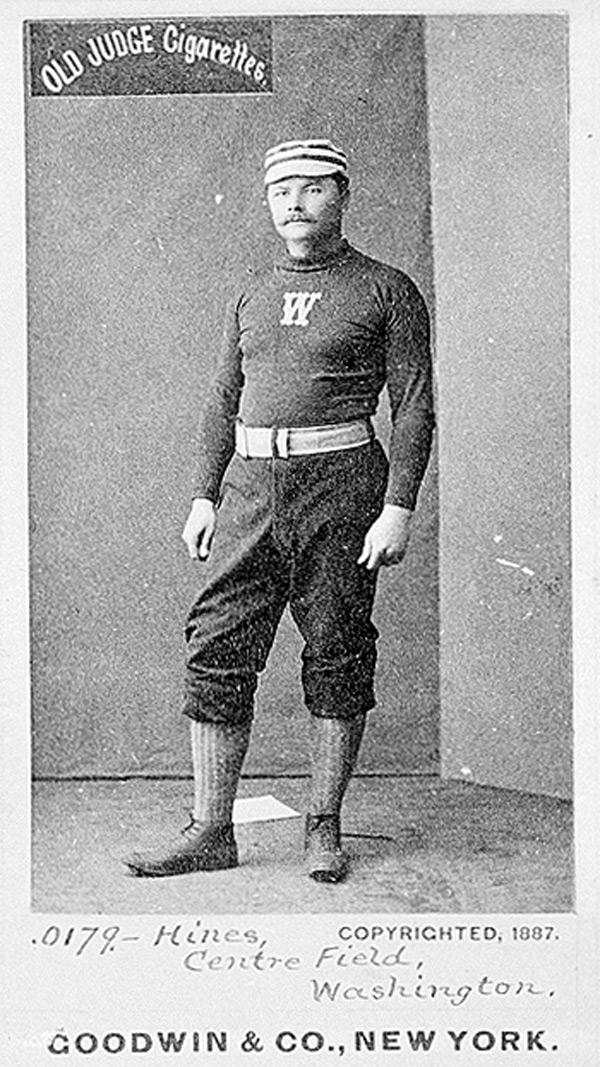
Center fielder Paul Hines

=== Season standings ===
National League
Team	W	L	Pct.	GB	Home	Road
Chicago White Stockings	67	17	.798	—	37‍–‍5	30‍–‍12
Providence Grays	52	32	.619	15	31‍–‍12	21‍–‍20
Cleveland Blues	47	37	.560	20	24‍–‍19	23‍–‍18
Troy Trojans	41	42	.494	25½	20‍–‍21	21‍–‍21
Worcester Worcesters	40	43	.482	26½	24‍–‍17	16‍–‍26
Boston Red Caps	40	44	.476	27	25‍–‍17	15‍–‍27
Buffalo Bisons	24	58	.293	42	13‍–‍28	11‍–‍30
Cincinnati Stars	21	59	.263	44	14‍–‍25	7‍–‍34

=== Record vs. opponents ===
1880 National League record Sources:
Team	BSN	BUF	CHI	CIN	CLE	PRO	TRO	WOR
Boston	—	9–3–1	3–9	7–5	5–7	5–7–1	7–5	4–8
Buffalo	3–9–1	—	1–11	5–5–2	3–9	2–10	1–11	9–3
Chicago	9–3	11–1	—	10–2–1	8–4	9–3–1	10–2	10–2
Cincinnati	5–7	5–5–2	2–10–1	—	3–9	2–10	1–10	3–8
Cleveland	7–5	9–3	4–8	9–3	—	3–9	9–3	6–6–1
Providence	7–5–1	10–2	3–9–1	10–2	9–3	—	7–5	6–6–1
Troy	5–7	11–1	2–10	10–1	3–9	5–7	—	5–7
Worcester	8–4	3–9	2–10	8–3	6–6–1	6–6–1	7–5	—

=== Roster ===
1880 Providence Grays
Roster
Pitchers: John Ward; Catchers: Emil Gross	Infielders: George Bradley; Jack Farrell; Mike McGeary; John Peters; Joe Start	Outfielders: Mike Dorgan; Paul Hines; Sadie Houck; Tom York	Manager: Mike Dorgan; Mike McGeary; John Ward

== Player stats ==
=== Batting ===
==== Starters by position ====
Note: Pos = Position; G = Games played; AB = At bats; H = Hits; Avg. = Batting average; HR = Home runs; RBI = Runs batted in

Pos	Player	G	AB	H	Avg.	HR	RBI
C	Emil Gross	87	347	90	.259	1	34
1B	Joe Start	82	345	96	.278	0	27
2B	Jack Farrell	80	339	92	.271	3	36
3B	George Bradley	82	309	70	.227	0	23
SS	John Peters	86	359	82	.246	0	31
OF	Mike Dorgan	79	321	79	.246	0	31
OF	Paul Hines	85	374	115	.307	3	35
OF	Tom York	53	203	43	.212	0	18

==== Other batters ====
Note: G = Games played; AB = At bats; H = Hits; Avg. = Batting average; HR = Home runs; RBI = Runs batted in

Player	G	AB	H	Avg.	HR	RBI
Sadie Houck	49	184	37	.201	1	22
Mike McGeary	18	59	8	.136	0	1

=== Pitching ===
==== Starting pitchers ====
Note: G = Games pitched; IP = Innings pitched; W = Wins; L = Losses; ERA = Earned run average; SO = Strikeouts

Player	G	IP	W	L	ERA	SO
John Ward	70	595.0	39	24	1.74	230
George Bradley	28	196.0	13	8	1.38	54

==== Relief pitchers ====
Note: G = Games pitched; W = Wins; L = Losses; SV = Saves; ERA = Earned run average; SO = Strikeouts

Player	G	W	L	SV	ERA	SO
Mike Dorgan	1	0	0	0	1.13	2
