= 1965 Baseball Hall of Fame balloting =

Elections to the Baseball Hall of Fame

National Baseball

Hall of Fame and Museum
- New inductees: 1
- via Veterans Committee: 1
- Total inductees: 102
- Induction date: July 26, 1965

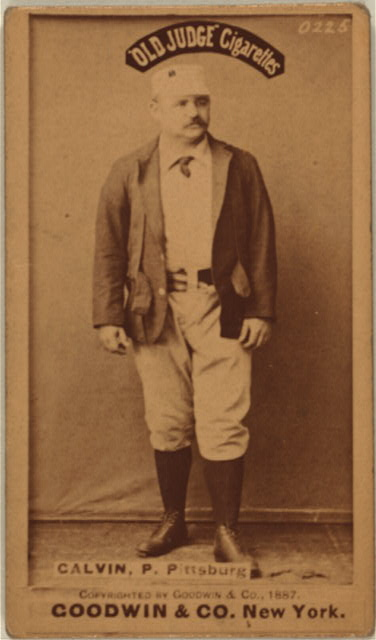
1965 inductee Pud Galvin

Elections to the Baseball Hall of Fame for 1965 followed a system established for odd-number years after the 1956 election. Namely, the baseball writers were voting on recent players only in even-number years. The Veterans Committee met in closed sessions to consider executives, managers, umpires, and earlier major league players. It selected 19th-century 300-game winner Pud Galvin. A formal induction ceremony was held in Cooperstown, New York, on July 26, 1965, with Commissioner of Baseball Ford Frick presiding.

The election of only one person who had been deceased for more than 60 years evoked wide criticism and led to the resumption of annual votes for recent players by the Baseball Writers' Association of America (BBWAA).

== J. G. Taylor Spink Award ==
Hugh Fullerton (1873–1945) received the J. G. Taylor Spink Award honoring a baseball writer. The award was voted at the December 1964 meeting of the BBWAA, and included in the summer 1965 ceremonies.
