= Mandelson (surname) =

Mandelson is a surname. Notable persons with this surname include:

- Ben Mandelson (born 1953), English world musician
- Jill Mandelson, a character in 31 North 62 East
- Kimberly Mandelson, a character in 31 North 62 East
- Peter Mandelson (born 1953), British politician

== See also ==
- Mandelson: The Real PM?, a 2010 documentary film about Peter Mandelson
- Mendelssohn (surname)
