= Bill Phillips (first baseman) =

Canadian baseball player (1857–1900)

- First baseman
- Born: April 30, 1857; Saint John, New Brunswick, British North America
- Died: October 7, 1900 (aged 43); Chicago, Illinois, U.S.
- Batted: Right Threw: Right

MLB debut
- May 1, 1879, for the Cleveland Blues

Last MLB appearance
- October 3, 1888, for the Kansas City Cowboys

MLB statistics
- Batting average: .266
- Hits: 1,130
- Runs: 562
- Stats at Baseball Reference

Teams
- Cleveland Blues (1879–1884); Brooklyn Grays (1885–1887); Kansas City Cowboys (1888)

Member of the Canadian

Baseball Hall of Fame
- Induction: 1988

William B. Phillips (April 30, 1857 – October 7, 1900), also known as "Silver Bill", was a Canadian professional baseball first baseman from the mid-1870s until the late 1880s. From 1879 to 1888, he played for three major league teams; the Cleveland Blues of the National League (NL) from 1879 to 1884, the Brooklyn Grays of the American Association (AA) from 1885 to 1887, and the Kansas City Cowboys of the AA in 1888. A native of Saint John, New Brunswick, Canada, he has the distinction of being the first Canadian to play in the major leagues.

As a batter, Phillips finished in the top-ten among league leaders on multiple occasions, including triples four times, and games played, at bats, doubles, runs batted in (RBIs), and extra base hits three times each. Additionally, as a fielder, he finished among the defensive leaders for the league's first baseman in double plays for three consecutive years, and twice finished first in putouts and fielding percentage. He died in Chicago at the age of 43. He was later enshrined into the Canadian Baseball Hall of Fame in 1988 for his accomplishments, and is considered by some to be greatest Canadian first baseman in baseball history.

== Early years ==
Phillips, born on April 30, 1857, came from a large family of English heritage. He had nine siblings, consisting of two brothers and seven sisters, and his father worked as a cooper. Known as "Willie" to his family, he had likely began his interest in the game of baseball while still in his hometown of Saint John, New Brunswick, Canada, considering there were at least nine amateur baseball clubs organized and playing there during the early 1870s. Canadian journalist Peter McGuire claims the Phillips family moved from Saint John in 1877, due to a major fire, which burned much of the city. However, according to Alfred Henry Spink, founder of the Sporting News, Phillips was playing baseball in the Chicago area at earlier date.

It is certain the family settled in Chicago in the mid to late-1870s as Phillips was playing for a top amateur team of the area called the Pastime club In 1877, he played professionally for an independent team in Winona, Minnesota, the Clipper Club. The club lasted just 29 games, and joined the Minneapolis Browns of the League Alliance (LA) in May. He played with the Browns into mid-August, then joined another LA club, the Janesville Mutual, later that month for a four-day stretch. Phillips joined independent Forest City club of Cleveland, Ohio, in 1878, and in 65 games had a batting average of .296 to lead the team. The next year, the Cleveland team joined the NL, which began Phillips' major league career.

== Career ==
=== Cleveland ===
The Forest City team of Cleveland joined the National League for the 1879 season as the Cleveland Blues, and Phillips made NL debut on May 1, becoming the first native Canadian to play in the major leagues. In his first NL season, he led the league's first basemen in games played with 75, was sixth in the league with 365 at bats, while leading the Blues in runs scored, and hits. In the 1880 season, his batting average dropped from .271 in 1879, to .256; however, he finished in the top-ten among the league leaders in games played with 85, which was first among first basemen, was fifth in the league with 10 triples, and led the league in double plays. On June 12, the Blues were the victim of the first recorded perfect game in history, thrown by Lee Richmond of the Worcester Worcesters. In that game, Phillips hit what appeared to be a single to right field, only to be thrown out at first base by the shallow-playing right fielder Lon Knight.

Phillips continued his consistent play in 1881, when his 85 games played led the league, and he finished second in the league with 10 triples, as well as top-ten totals in extra-base hits with 29, and at bats with 357. However, his batting statistics declined, in both 1882 and 1883, his batting average dipping to a low of .246 in 1883, but he did finish eighth in league with four home runs in 1882, and he again led all first basemen in double plays. In 1884, when teammates Fred Dunlap and Jack Glasscock jumped to the Union Association, he attempted to fill the void. Although he batted .276, the highest average on the Blues' team, achieved his highest career statistical totals in nearly all batting categories, it was not enough, as Cleveland finished 49 games out of first place. The seventh-place finish by the Blues, along with the decline of fan support, resulted in the financial instability of the franchise, and it folded after the season.

=== Brooklyn ===
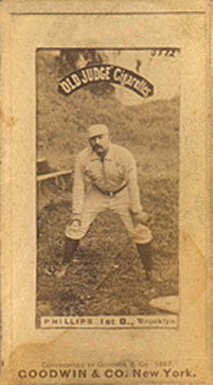
Phillips in 1887.

Following the demise of the Blues, the Brooklyn Grays of AA signed their former manager, Charlie Hackett, along with Phillips and six other Blues' players, including and the team signed many Cleveland's best players, including Phillips and Germany Smith. In Phillips' first season with Brooklyn, he established his highest seasonal batting average of his career with .302, which was the seventh highest in the league, and led all first basemen in putouts, and fielding percentage. Additionally, his on-base percentage of .364 placed in the top five among AA hitters, he led his team in RBIs with 63, slugging percentage, and triples.

He continued his success for Grays 1886, establishing his highest seasonal career totals in games played with 141, which led the AA, and hits with 160, which was fifth among the league leaders. In 1887, he became the second Canadian baseball player to surpass 100 RBIs in a season, when he finished with a total of 101, Tip O'Neill having done so in 1886 with the St. Louis Browns. He led the league in fielding percentage among first basemen for the second time, and his 34 doubles were sixth in the league.

== Final years ==
Phillips was sold to the Kansas City Cowboys during the off-season to make room for Dave Orr. By the end of the 1888 season, Phillips' abilities began to decline at a rapid pace, which brought about sympathy among the baseball community. Years later, Charles Comiskey recalled that when he was the manager for the St. Louis Browns, instructing his pitchers to throw easy-to-hit pitches for Phillips so that his public image would remain intact. The 1888 season was Phillips' last at the major league level, and while he had his lowest seasonal batting average of .236, he again led the league in putouts. He returned to Canada to play one more season of professional baseball, with Hamilton Hams of the International League. However, he batted just .245, which signaled the end of his playing career. Phillips never married, and he died on October 7, 1900, in Chicago at the age of 43, of syphilitic locomotor ataxia, and he is interred at Graceland Cemetery. Phillips was enshrined into the Canadian Baseball Hall of Fame in 1988.

== Career statistics ==
Bill Phillips' career totals as recognized by Baseball-Reference.com.

G	AB	R	H	2B	3B	HR	RBI	SB	BB	SO	BA	OBP	SLG	TB	HBP
1,038	4,255	562	1,130	214	98	17	534	*39	178	*215	.266	.299	.374	1,591	*25

- ' * ' denotes statistics that were not officially recognized during parts or all of his career, and are incomplete.
