= Charlie Guth =

American baseball player (1856–1883)

- Pitcher
- Born: 1856; Chicago
- Died: July 5, 1883 (aged 26–27); Cambridge, Massachusetts
- Batted: Unknown Threw: Unknown

MLB debut
- September 30, 1880, for the Chicago White Stockings

Last MLB appearance
- September 30, 1880, for the Chicago White Stockings

MLB statistics
- Win–loss record: 1–0
- Earned run average: 5.00
- Strikeouts: 7
- Stats at Baseball Reference

Teams
- Chicago White Stockings (1880)

Charles J. Guth (1856 – July 5, 1883) was a professional baseball player who played pitcher in the Major Leagues in 1880. He played one game for the Chicago White Stockings. Guth was a semi-professional player who was called up to pitch due to both Larry Corcoran and Fred Goldsmith being ill.

== Death ==
Three years after making his debut, Guth died from asthenia.
