= John Montgomery Ward =

American baseball player and manager (1860–1925)

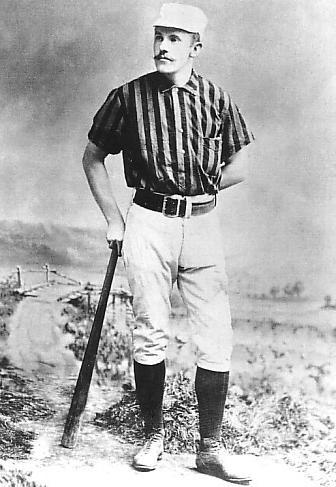
- Ward, c. 1877–1894
- Shortstop / Second baseman / Pitcher
- Born: March 3, 1860; Bellefonte, Pennsylvania, U.S.
- Died: March 4, 1925 (aged 65); Augusta, Georgia, U.S.
- Batted: Left Threw: Right

MLB debut
- July 15, 1878, for the Providence Grays

Last MLB appearance
- September 29, 1894, for the New York Giants

MLB statistics
- Batting average: .275
- Home runs: 26
- Runs batted in: 867
- Stolen bases: 540
- Win–loss record: 164–103
- Earned run average: 2.10
- Strikeouts: 920
- Stats at Baseball Reference

Teams
- As player: Providence Grays (1878–1882); New York Gothams / Giants (1883–1889); Brooklyn Ward's Wonders (1890); Brooklyn Grooms (1891–1892); New York Giants (1893–1894); As manager: Providence Grays (1880); New York Gothams (1884); Brooklyn Ward's Wonders (1890); Brooklyn Grooms (1891–1892); New York Giants (1893–1894)

Career highlights and awards
- NL wins leader (1879); NL ERA leader (1878); NL strikeout leader (1879); 2× NL stolen base leader (1887, 1892); Pitched a perfect game on June 17, 1880

Member of the National

Baseball Hall of Fame
- Induction: 1964
- Election method: Veterans Committee

John Montgomery Ward (March 3, 1860 – March 4, 1925), also known as Monte Ward, was an American professional baseball player, manager, executive, union organizer, owner and author. Ward, of English descent, was born in Bellefonte, Pennsylvania and grew up in Renovo, Pennsylvania. He led the formation of the first professional sports players union and a new baseball league, the Players' League.

== Early life ==
Ward attended the Bellefonte Academy in the early 1870s, and at 13 years of age, he was sent to Pennsylvania State University. In his short time there, he helped jumpstart a baseball program and is often credited for developing the first curveball. However, he was kicked out of school for pushing an upperclassman who attempted to haze him down a flight of stairs, and stealing chickens.

The following year, in 1874, his parents James and Ruth died. He tried to make it as a travelling salesman, but when that proved unsuccessful, he returned to his hometown. There, he rediscovered baseball. In 1878, the semiprofessional team for which he was playing folded, which opened the door for him to move on to a new opportunity. He was offered a contract to pitch for the Providence Grays of the still new National League, an all-professional major league that had begun its operations in 1876.

== Providence Grays ==
Ward's first season with the Grays was a successful one, going 22–13 with a 1.51 ERA. He played that season exclusively as a pitcher, but during the following two seasons he played increasingly in the outfield and at third base. Ward had his two finest seasons as a pitcher, going 47–19 with 239 strikeouts and a 2.15 ERA in 1879 and 39–24 with 230 strikeouts and a 1.74 ERA in 1880. He pitched nearly 600 innings each year (587.0 in 1879 and 595.0 in 1880). As a 19-year-old pitcher, he won 47 games and led the 1879 Providence Grays to a first-place finish.

In 1880, he began to play other positions. On June 17, 1880, Ward pitched the second perfect game in baseball history, defeating future Hall of Famer Pud Galvin and the Buffalo Bisons, 5–0. Lee Richmond had thrown baseball's first perfect game just five days before, on June 12. The next perfect game by a National League pitcher would not happen for 84 years, when Jim Bunning pitched a perfect game in 1964. Ward also expanded his leadership role to include managing when he became a player-manager for the team's final 32 games, winning 18 of them, as the Grays finished in second place.

The seasons of 1881 and 1882 were the first in which he played more games in the outfield than he pitched. This was due to a nagging arm injury he originally incurred sliding into a base. He still pitched well when he did pitch, winning 37 games over those two seasons and having ERAs of 2.13 and 2.59 respectively, and on August 17, 1882, he pitched the longest complete game shutout in history, blanking the Detroit Wolverines 1–0 in 18 innings. By this time, however, the Grays felt his best days were behind him and sold their former ace hurler to the New York Giants.

== New York and reserve clause ==
Ward moved to the new New York NL club in 1883. An injury to his right arm while running the bases during the 1884 season ended Ward's pitching career. As he could not wait for his arm to heal before he returned to the field, he taught himself to throw left-handed so he could play center field for the remainder of the 1884 season. He replaced Jim Price as the Giants' manager for the final 16 games of the 1884 season.

With his arm fully recuperated, he became the everyday shortstop in 1885.

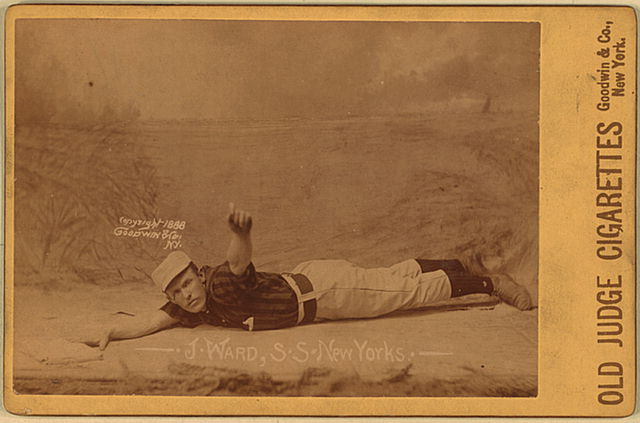
John Montgomery Ward baseball card, 1887

Ward graduated from Columbia Law School in 1885 and led the players in forming the Brotherhood of Professional Base Ball Players, the first sports labor union. Ward and the players had become frustrated with the owners' reserve clause, which allowed them to sign players to one-year contracts and then not allow them to negotiate with other teams when those contracts expired. The players felt that the owners had absolute power. At first, the players had some success, gaining the freedom to negotiate with other teams when they were asked to take a pay cut by their current team. In October 1887, Ward married actress Helen Dauvray.

In 1888, after the Giants had finished first in the National League, and had won a playoff series known today as a "World Series", they played the St. Louis Browns of the American Association for the "Dauvray Cup", which was named after Ward's wife. Ward then captained an All-Star team which, paired with Cap Anson's Chicago club, headed off on a barnstorming world tour organized by Albert Spalding that visited Australia, Egypt, and Europe. The owners held their winter meetings, and created a classification system that would determine a player's salary. Under the system, the most a player could earn was $2,500 (equivalent to $90,000 in 2025). The Giants then sold Ward to the Washington Nationals for a record price of $12,000. Ward was furious and left the tour early. He then demanded a meeting with the owners, and said he would refuse to play for Washington unless he received a large portion of his record sale price. Washington eventually refused payment on the transaction, nullifying the deal.

The owners denied Ward's request for a meeting to discuss the new classification system, saying no talks would be held until after the upcoming season. Though Ward and the union fought hard for these issues, this did not distract him or his Giants team, as he hit .299 and helped the Giants capture their second-straight "World Series" title in 1889.

Amidst Ward's commitments as a ballplayer and union organizer, he still found time for a third occupation, that of author. His 1888 book, Base-Ball: How to Become a Player, with the Origin, History and Explanation of the Game was the first published effort to explore baseball's development from its early roots.

== The Players' League ==
Ward realized that negotiations with the owners were going nowhere and threatened to create a Players' League. The owners thought of it as nothing more than an idle threat but had failed to realize Ward's connections in the business community, and he began to launch the new league. This new Players' League included a profit sharing system for the players and had no reserve clause or classification plan.

The season began in 1890 with over half of the National League's players from the previous year in its ranks. Ward acted as a player-manager for the Brooklyn club, nicknamed the Ward's Wonders, and finished seventh in the league with a .335 batting average. While the Players' League drew well at the box office, the teams' owners grew nervous when the money did not come in as expected because of the profit sharing system. Soon they began holding secret meetings with their National League counterparts and, one by one, sold their teams to the rival league.

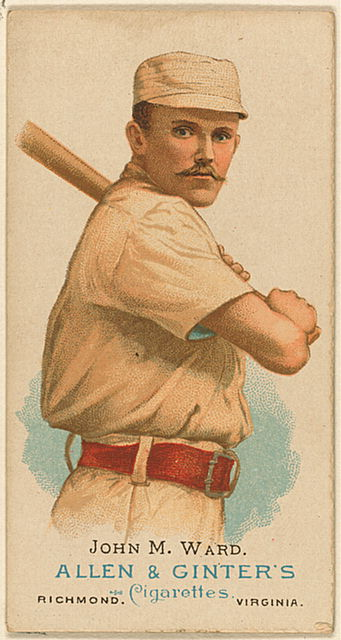
1887 baseball card

== Later career ==
Due to an agreement after the dissolution of the Players' League, Ward stayed in Brooklyn as player-manager for the National League team, the Brooklyn Grooms. Following the 1892 season, Ward expressed his desire to return to the Giants and was sold to his former club for $6,000. Despite his declining bat, Ward led the league in stolen bases in 1893. Following the 1894 season, he retired at the age of 34. He finished his career with a .275 average, 2,104 hits, and 540 stolen bases. He is the only man in history to win over 100 games as a pitcher and collect over 2,000 hits.

== Post-career ==
Ward retired from baseball at age 34 in order to enter the legal profession. As a successful lawyer he represented baseball players against the National League. Later he acted as president and part-owner of the Boston Braves franchise and became an official in the short-lived Federal League in 1914, acting as the business manager of the Brooklyn Tip-Tops.

In the last quarter century of his life, Ward's sporting passion became golf. He won several championships around New York, played all over Europe, and competed regularly in the United States Golf Association U.S. Amateur. He finished second in the prestigious North and South Amateur Championship at Pinehurst Country Club in North Carolina in 1903. The North and South Amateur was the equal of any major golf event at the turn of the century. The first North and South event took place in 1901. Ever the organizer, he was one of the founders of the New York Golf Association and the Long Island Golf Association.

Ward died in Augusta, Georgia, the day after his 65th birthday on March 4, 1925, after a bout of pneumonia, and is interred in Greenfield Cemetery in Hempstead, Long Island, New York. Named in the Honor Rolls of Baseball in 1946, Ward was elected to the Baseball Hall of Fame by the Veterans Committee in 1964. He was inducted into the Suffolk Sports Hall of Fame on Long Island in the Baseball and Historic Recognition Categories with the Class of 2000.

== See also ==
- List of Major League Baseball annual ERA leaders
- List of Major League Baseball perfect games
- List of Major League Baseball player-managers
- List of Major League Baseball career hits leaders
- List of Major League Baseball career runs scored leaders
- List of Major League Baseball career stolen bases leaders
- List of Major League Baseball annual saves leaders
- List of Major League Baseball annual stolen base leaders
- List of Major League Baseball annual strikeout leaders
- List of Major League Baseball annual wins leaders

Achievements
| Preceded by Lee Richmond | Perfect game pitcher June 17, 1880 | Succeeded by Cy Young |
| Preceded by Lee Richmond | No-hitter pitcher June 17, 1880 | Succeeded by Larry Corcoran |
