= Carolyn Mendelsohn =

English portrait photographer

Carolyn Mendelsohn is an English portrait photographer.

== Life and work ==
Mendelsohn originally trained and worked as an actor and film-maker, becoming a professional photographer in 2008.

In 2016 she won a gold medal in the Royal Photographic Society's International Photography Exhibition (IPE 159) for Alice Being Inbetween, part of her project "Being Inbetween" for which she is photographing girls aged 10 to 12; this portrait was also selected for the 2017 Portrait of Britain, being one of 100 photographs which were displayed on billboards nationwide. Her Maria, 10 from the same project is included in IPE 160. Each girl chooses her own clothes and pose. Mendelsohn says that girls of this age-group are "at a vulnerable stage and are often hidden within the cocoon of familial protection until they emerge as young women", and that "The series is a way of giving a voice and face to the girl I was and the girls who are; a way to explore the hidden complexity, duality and contradictions that mark this phase of life." In 2024 Mendelssohn received an RPS (The Royal Photographic Society) Award for Photography with Young People.

Mendelsohn is a Fellow of the Royal Photographic Society (awarded March 2026) and a Member of the Association of Photographers.

She is based in Saltaire, West Yorkshire. She has three children.
