= Steve Dignan =

American baseball player (1861–1881)

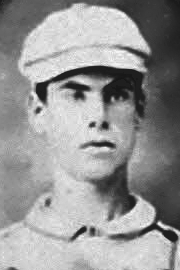
- Outfielder
- Born: April 16, 1861; Boston, Massachusetts
- Died: July 11, 1881 (aged 20); Boston, Massachusetts
- Batted: Unknown Threw: Unknown

MLB debut
- June 1, 1880, for the Boston Red Caps

Last MLB appearance
- August 7, 1880, for the Worcester Ruby Legs

MLB statistics
- Batting average: .318
- Runs: 5
- Runs batted in: 6
- Stats at Baseball Reference

Teams
- Boston Red Caps (1880); Worcester Ruby Legs (1880)

Stephen E. Dignan (April 16, 1861 – July 11, 1881) was an American Major League Baseball outfielder from Boston, Massachusetts, who played for the Boston Red Caps and Worcester Ruby Legs during the 1880 season. He died in his hometown of Boston at the age of 20 due to consumption, and is interred at Mount Calvary Cemetery, in Roslindale, Boston, Massachusetts.
