= Nathan Menderson =

German-born American business executive and baseball executive

- Born: April 25, 1820; Lichtenfels, Bavaria (Note: At the time of Menderson's birth, Bavaria was part of the German Confederation.)
- Died: March 31, 1904 (aged 83); Cincinnati, Ohio, US
- Resting place: United Jewish Cemetery, Cincinnati
- Occupations: Clothing store owner; Vice president of the Cincinnati Stars (NL)

Nathan Menderson (April 25, 1820 – March 31, 1904) was a German-born American business executive, the owner of one of the largest clothing stores in Cincinnati. He is best remembered for being vice president of the Cincinnati Stars baseball team of the National League, serving as president pro tempore in 1880, when Justus Thorner departed in early July. The 1880 Stars finished 21–59, in last place in the eight-team National League.

Menderson came to the United States from Bavaria in 1845, and amassed a fortune. He operated his clothing store until retiring in the fall of 1886. He was renowned for his generosity and gentle habits. In the words of his obituary, he was "simple, kindly, loving both his family and his fellow man better than himself." Menderson and his wife had six children. He is buried in Cincinnati's United Jewish Cemetery.
