= 1880 Buffalo Bisons season =

1880 Buffalo Bisons
- League: National League
- Ballpark: Riverside Park
- City: Buffalo, New York
- Record: 24–58 (.293)
- League place: 7th
- Manager: Sam Crane

The 1880 Buffalo Bisons finished the season with a 24–58 record, good for seventh place in the National League.

== Regular season ==
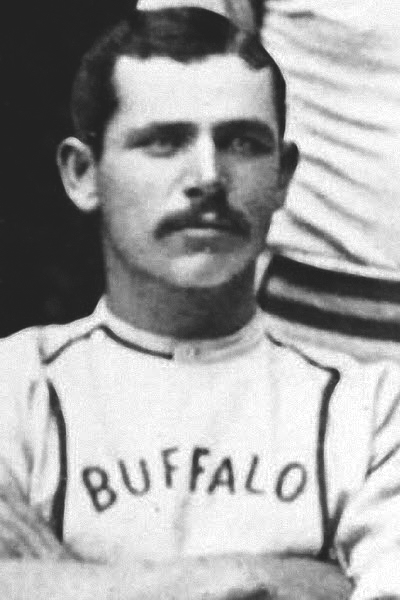
Right fielder Bill Crowley

First baseman Dude Esterbrook

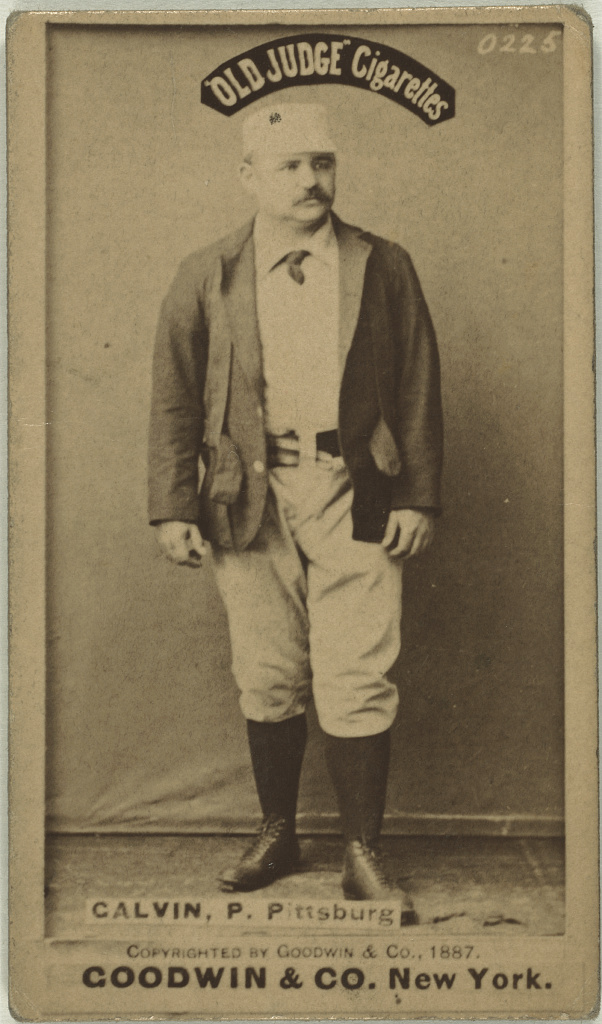
Pitcher Pud Galvin

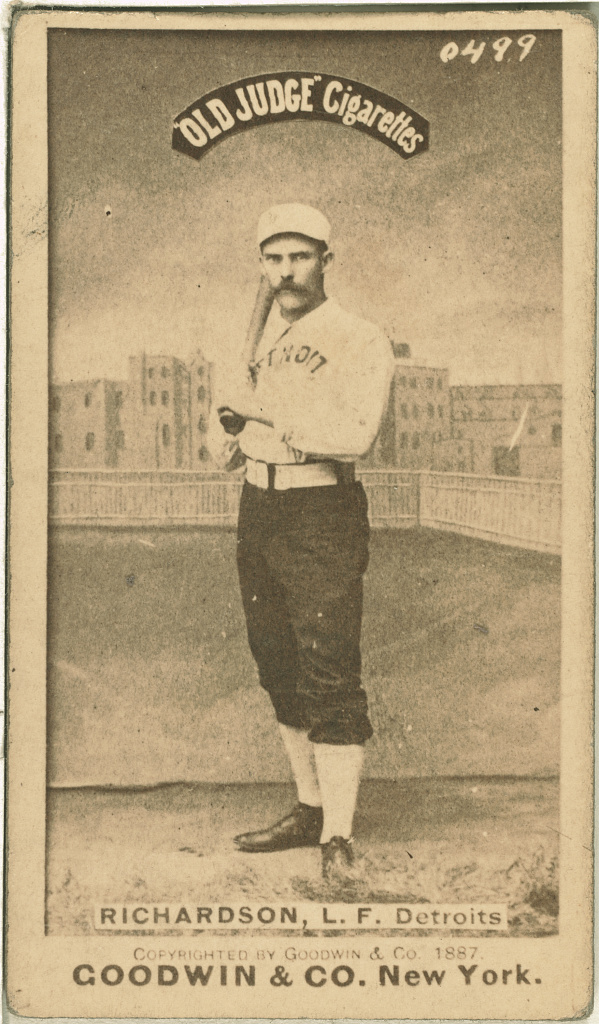
Third baseman Hardy Richardson

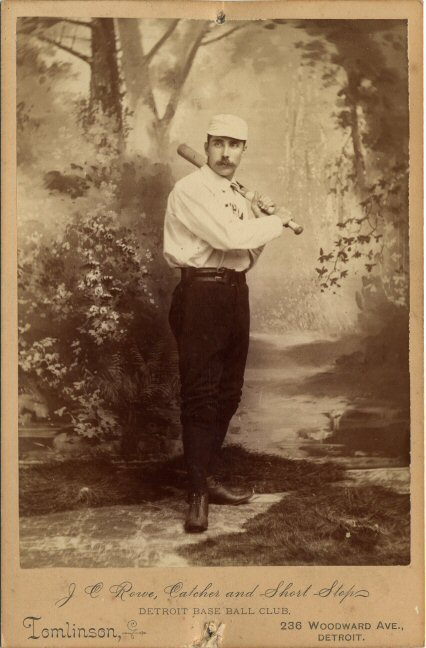
Catcher Jack Rowe

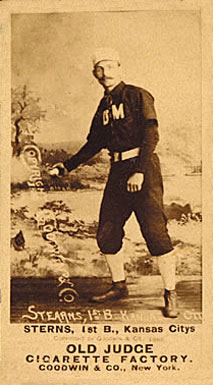
Right fielder Dan Stearns

=== Season standings ===
National League
| Team | W | L | Pct. | GB | Home | Road |
|---|---|---|---|---|---|---|
| Chicago White Stockings | 67 | 17 | .798 | — | 37‍–‍5 | 30‍–‍12 |
| Providence Grays | 52 | 32 | .619 | 15 | 31‍–‍12 | 21‍–‍20 |
| Cleveland Blues | 47 | 37 | .560 | 20 | 24‍–‍19 | 23‍–‍18 |
| Troy Trojans | 41 | 42 | .494 | 25½ | 20‍–‍21 | 21‍–‍21 |
| Worcester Worcesters | 40 | 43 | .482 | 26½ | 24‍–‍17 | 16‍–‍26 |
| Boston Red Caps | 40 | 44 | .476 | 27 | 25‍–‍17 | 15‍–‍27 |
| Buffalo Bisons | 24 | 58 | .293 | 42 | 13‍–‍28 | 11‍–‍30 |
| Cincinnati Stars | 21 | 59 | .263 | 44 | 14‍–‍25 | 7‍–‍34 |

=== Record vs. opponents ===
1880 National League record Sources:
| Team | BSN | BUF | CHI | CIN | CLE | PRO | TRO | WOR |
|---|---|---|---|---|---|---|---|---|
| Boston | — | 9–3–1 | 3–9 | 7–5 | 5–7 | 5–7–1 | 7–5 | 4–8 |
| Buffalo | 3–9–1 | — | 1–11 | 5–5–2 | 3–9 | 2–10 | 1–11 | 9–3 |
| Chicago | 9–3 | 11–1 | — | 10–2–1 | 8–4 | 9–3–1 | 10–2 | 10–2 |
| Cincinnati | 5–7 | 5–5–2 | 2–10–1 | — | 3–9 | 2–10 | 1–10 | 3–8 |
| Cleveland | 7–5 | 9–3 | 4–8 | 9–3 | — | 3–9 | 9–3 | 6–6–1 |
| Providence | 7–5–1 | 10–2 | 3–9–1 | 10–2 | 9–3 | — | 7–5 | 6–6–1 |
| Troy | 5–7 | 11–1 | 2–10 | 10–1 | 3–9 | 5–7 | — | 5–7 |
| Worcester | 8–4 | 3–9 | 2–10 | 8–3 | 6–6–1 | 6–6–1 | 7–5 | — |

=== Roster ===
1880 Buffalo Bisons
Roster
| Pitchers: Pud Galvin; Bill McGunnigle; Tom Poorman; Stump Weidman; Catchers: Tom Kearns; Jim Keenan; Jack Rowe | Infielders: Sam Crane; Dude Esterbrook; Davy Force; Chick Fulmer; Arlie Latham; Denny Mack; Mike Moynahan; Hardy Richardson; Oscar Walker | Outfielders: Bill Crowley; Denny Driscoll; Joe Hornung; Old Hoss Radbourn; Dan Stearns | Manager: Sam Crane |

== Player stats ==
=== Batting ===
==== Starters by position ====
Note: Pos = Position; G = Games played; AB = At bats; H = Hits; Avg. = Batting average; HR = Home runs; RBI = Runs batted in

| Pos | Player | G | AB | H | Avg. | HR | RBI |
|---|---|---|---|---|---|---|---|
| C | Jack Rowe | 76 | 326 | 82 | .252 | 1 | 36 |
| 1B | Dude Esterbrook | 64 | 253 | 61 | .241 | 0 | 35 |
| 2B | Davy Force | 81 | 290 | 49 | .169 | 0 | 17 |
| 3B | Hardy Richardson | 83 | 343 | 89 | .259 | 0 | 17 |
| SS | Mike Moynahan | 27 | 100 | 33 | .330 | 0 | 14 |
| OF | Bill Crowley | 85 | 354 | 95 | .268 | 0 | 20 |
| OF | Joe Hornung | 85 | 342 | 91 | .266 | 1 | 42 |
| OF | Dan Stearns | 28 | 104 | 19 | .183 | 0 | 13 |

==== Other batters ====
Note: G = Games played; AB = At bats; H = Hits; Avg. = Batting average; HR = Home runs; RBI = Runs batted in

| Player | G | AB | H | Avg. | HR | RBI |
|---|---|---|---|---|---|---|
| Oscar Walker | 34 | 126 | 29 | .230 | 1 | 15 |
| Arlie Latham | 22 | 79 | 10 | .127 | 0 | 3 |
| Denny Driscoll | 18 | 65 | 10 | .154 | 0 | 4 |
| Denny Mack | 17 | 59 | 12 | .203 | 0 | 3 |
| Chick Fulmer | 11 | 44 | 7 | .159 | 0 | 1 |
| Sam Crane | 10 | 31 | 4 | .129 | 0 | 2 |
| Old Hoss Radbourn | 6 | 21 | 3 | .143 | 0 | 1 |
| Tom Kearns | 2 | 7 | 0 | .000 | 0 | 0 |
| Jim Keenan | 2 | 7 | 1 | .143 | 0 | 0 |

=== Pitching ===
==== Starting pitchers ====
Note: G = Games pitched; IP = Innings pitched; W = Wins; L = Losses; ERA = Earned run average; SO = Strikeouts

| Player | G | IP | W | L | ERA | SO |
|---|---|---|---|---|---|---|
| Pud Galvin | 58 | 458.2 | 20 | 35 | 2.71 | 128 |
| Stump Weidman | 17 | 113.2 | 0 | 9 | 3.40 | 25 |
| Tom Poorman | 11 | 85.0 | 1 | 8 | 4.13 | 13 |
| Bill McGunnigle | 5 | 37.0 | 2 | 3 | 3.41 | 3 |

==== Other pitchers ====
Note: G = Games pitched; IP = Innings pitched; W = Wins; L = Losses; ERA = Earned run average; SO = Strikeouts

| Player | G | IP | W | L | ERA | SO |
|---|---|---|---|---|---|---|
| Denny Driscoll | 6 | 41.2 | 1 | 3 | 3.89 | 17 |

==== Relief pitchers ====
Note: G = Games pitched; W = Wins; L = Losses; SV = Saves; ERA = Earned run average; SO = Strikeouts

| Player | G | W | L | SV | ERA | SO |
|---|---|---|---|---|---|---|
| Joe Hornung | 1 | 0 | 0 | 0 | 6.00 | 0 |
