= John Reilly (baseball) =

American baseball player (1858–1937)

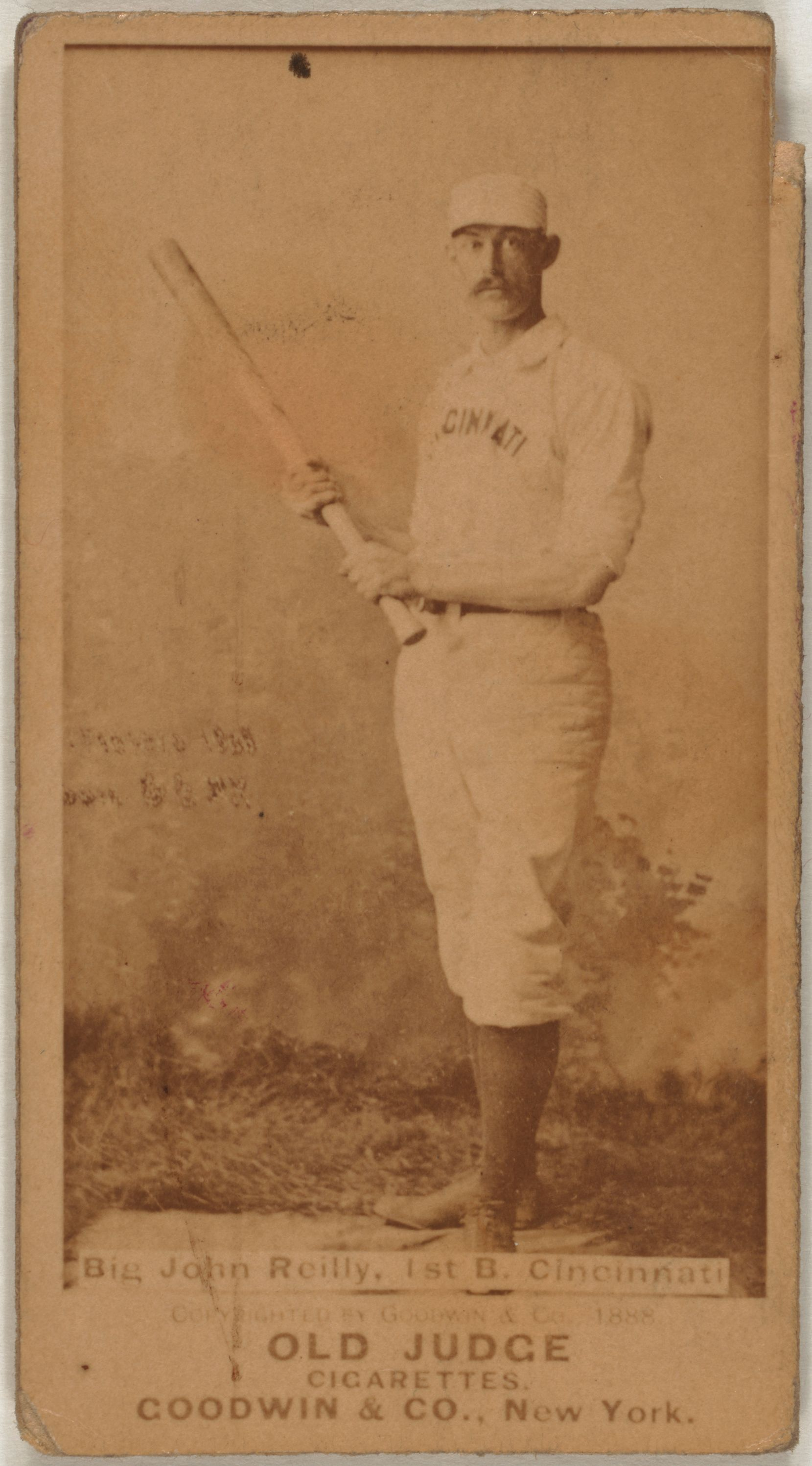
- First baseman
- Born: October 5, 1858; Cincinnati, Ohio, U.S.
- Died: May 31, 1937 (aged 78); Cincinnati, Ohio, U.S.
- Batted: Right Threw: Right

MLB debut
- May 18, 1880, for the Cincinnati Stars

Last MLB appearance
- October 3, 1891, for the Cincinnati Reds

MLB statistics
- Batting average: .289
- Home runs: 69
- Runs batted in: 740
- Stats at Baseball Reference

Teams
- Cincinnati Stars (1880); Cincinnati Red Stockings/Reds (1883–1891)

Career highlights and awards
- 2× AA home run champion (1884, 1888); Hit for the cycle a record three times (shared); Cincinnati Reds Hall of Fame

John Good Reilly (October 5, 1858 – May 31, 1937), nicknamed "Long John", was an American first baseman in Major League Baseball who played for the Cincinnati Stars (1880) and the Cincinnati Red Stockings/Reds (1883–1891). In 1888, he hit 13 home runs with 103 RBI and a .321 batting average. During and after his baseball career, Reilly was a commercial artist for the Strobridge Lithographing Company.

== Early life ==
Born in 1858, Reilly was the son of a Civil War gunboat captain for the Union named Frank A. Reilly. When his father was killed at the Battle of Fort Donelson in 1862, Reilly was sent by his mother to live with some of her relatives in Illinois, and he spent the next several years there.

When he was about 14 years old, Reilly returned to his native Cincinnati to take a course in lithography at a design school. He apprenticed at the Strobridge Lithographing Company, and he played his first organized baseball for the company team. Reilly showed early ability as a catcher, but by 1877, having become a professional artist with Strobridge, he began playing in the infield to avoid hand injuries that might threaten his lithography career.

== Career ==
Reilly played one season for the Cincinnati Stars in the National League (NL) and was out of the major leagues for the following two seasons, playing for the New York Metropolitans in 1882 when it was an independent team. From 1883 to 1891, he played for the Cincinnati Red Stockings/Reds of the American Association and the NL.

He hit 69 home runs and batted .289 during his ten-year career. Reilly was among the top ten of the all-time home run list from 1888 to 1892. His career highs in a season were 135 games played, 553 at bats, 112 runs, 170 hits, 35 doubles, 26 triples, 13 home runs, 103 RBI, 82 stolen bases, 34 walks, a .339 average, a .366 on-base percentage, a .551 slugging percentage, and 264 total bases.

He was also the first player to hit for the cycle on three occasions during his career, doing so twice in the American Association and once in the National League. He accomplished the feat twice in 1883 — the first on September 12 and the second exactly one week later on September 19, setting the major league record for the shortest time between cycles. His third cycle came on August 6, 1890.

== Later life ==
Ren Mulford, a writer for Sporting Life, reported in 1914 that Reilly was "a rare old bachelor devoted to his art, and seldom goes to the ball yard where he once reigned a ruling favorite." Reilly remained employed with Strobridge until 1932, according to at least one source.

Reilly died in 1937. He was inducted into the Cincinnati Reds Hall of Fame on June 23, 2012.

== See also ==
- List of Major League Baseball annual home run leaders
- List of Major League Baseball annual runs batted in leaders
- List of Major League Baseball annual triples leaders
- List of Major League Baseball career triples leaders
- List of Major League Baseball players to hit for the cycle
- List of Major League Baseball single-game hits leaders

Achievements
Preceded by Harry Stovey	American Association Home Run Champion; 1884	Succeeded by Harry Stovey
Preceded by Tip O'Neill	American Association Home Run Champion; 1888	Succeeded by Bug Holliday, Harry Stovey
Preceded by Lon Knight; John Reilly; Oyster Burns	Hitting for the cycle September 12, 1883; September 19, 1883; August 6, 1890	Succeeded by John Reilly; Jim O'Rourke; Farmer Weaver
