= Robert Mendelsohn =

Robert Mendelsohn may refer to:

- Robert O. Mendelsohn (born 1952), American environmental economist
- Robert S. Mendelsohn (1926–1988), American pediatrician
