= Bill Tobin (baseball) =

American baseball player (1854–1912)

- First baseman
- Born: October 10, 1854; Hartford, Connecticut
- Died: October 10, 1912 (aged 58); Hartford, Connecticut
- Batted: Left Threw: Unknown

MLB debut
- July 21, 1880, for the Worcester Ruby Legs

Last MLB appearance
- September 27, 1880, for the Troy Trojans

MLB statistics
- Batting average: .158
- Home runs: 0
- Runs batted in: 11
- Stats at Baseball Reference

Teams
- Worcester Ruby Legs (1880); Troy Trojans (1880)

William F. Tobin (October 10, 1854 – October 10, 1912) was a first baseman in Major League Baseball in 1880. He split the season between two teams, debuting in July with the Worcester Ruby Legs and ending the year with the Troy Trojans. He died on his 58th birthday in 1912.

== Sources ==
- Career statistics from Baseball Reference, or Baseball Reference (Minors)
