= Lon Knight =

American baseball player and manager (1853–1932)

- Right fielder / Pitcher / Manager
- Born: June 16, 1853; Philadelphia, Pennsylvania, U.S.
- Died: April 23, 1932 (aged 78); Philadelphia, Pennsylvania, U.S.
- Batted: Right Threw: Right

MLB debut
- September 4, 1875, for the Philadelphia Athletics

Last MLB appearance
- October 10, 1885, for the Providence Grays

MLB statistics
- Games played: 545
- Hits: 555
- Batting average: .243
- Win–loss record: 16–28
- Earned run average: 2.77
- Stats at Baseball Reference

Teams
- As player: Philadelphia Athletics (NA/NL) (1875–1876); Worcester Ruby Legs (1880); Detroit Wolverines (1881–1882); Philadelphia Athletics (AA) (1883–1885); Providence Grays (1885); As manager: Philadelphia Athletics (1883–1884)

Alonzo P. "Lon" Knight, born Alonzo P. Letti (June 16, 1853 – April 23, 1932) was an American right fielder, right-handed pitcher and manager in Major League Baseball. He threw the first pitch in the first game played in the new National League on April 22, 1876.

== Early life and education ==
He was born in Philadelphia and attended Girard College at age 9 after his father died of typhoid fever. At Girard College, he changed his last name from Letti to Knight possibly to avoid ethnic hostility toward Italians. After graduation, he worked for a brief time as an accountant.

== Career ==
He began playing with the Philadelphia Athletics in 1875 when the team was in the National Association, then stayed with them when they joined the National League in 1876. When the team folded after the 1876 season, he did not play in the major leagues again until 1880, when he joined the Worcester Ruby Legs of the NL for one season, and the Detroit Wolverines for two. In 1883, he was named the manager of the Philadelphia Athletics of the American Association, and the team won the league pennant with Knight also playing right field. In 1884 the team fell back to seventh place in a 13-team league. He finished his career in 1885 when he split the season between the Athletics and the Providence Grays.

On May 21, 1880, he was playing right field at Riverside Park in Albany, New York when Lip Pike hit a ball over the fence and into the river. Few parks at the time had ground rules concerning balls hit over the fence. It was not an automatic home run, so Knight pursued the ball in a boat, eventually giving up.

On July 30, 1883, Knight "hit for the cycle" against Pittsburgh and is credited with the first ever natural-cycle in baseball.

After Knight's playing career ended, he was an umpire for several seasons; his most active year was 1890, when he officiated 123 games in the Players' League. He umpired a total of 212 major league games.

Knight died of poisoning at age 78 in Philadelphia when the gas line to the heater in his house leaked. He is interred at Laurel Hill Cemetery in an unmarked grave in Section H, Lot 63–64.

== See also ==
- List of Major League Baseball players to hit for the cycle
- List of Major League Baseball single-game hits leaders
- List of Major League Baseball player-managers

Sporting positions
| Preceded by Juice Latham | Philadelphia Athletics (AA) Manager; 1883–1884 | Succeeded by Harry Stovey |
Achievements
| Preceded by Curry Foley | Hitting for the cycle July 30, 1883 | Succeeded by John Reilly |
