= Doc Kennedy =

American baseball player (1853–1920)

- Catcher
- Born: August 11, 1853; Brooklyn, New York, U.S.
- Died: May 23, 1920 (aged 66); Grove, New York, U.S.
- Batted: Right Threw: Right

MLB debut
- May 1, 1879, for the Cleveland Blues

Last MLB appearance
- July 6, 1883, for the Buffalo Bisons

MLB statistics
- Games played: 160
- Batting average: .260
- Runs batted in: 53
- Stats at Baseball Reference

Teams
- Cleveland Blues (1879–1882); Buffalo Bisons (1883)

Michael Joseph "Doc" Kennedy (August 11, 1853 – May 23, 1920) was an American professional baseball player. He played catcher in the major leagues from 1879 to 1883.
