= Buttercup Dickerson =

American baseball player (1858–1920)

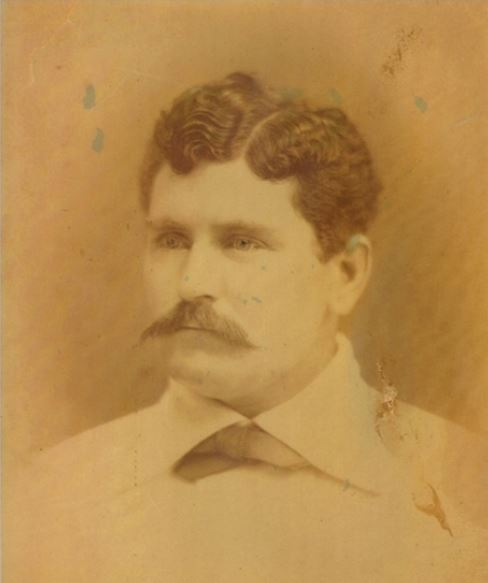
- Outfielder
- Born: Lewis Pessano Dickerson; October 11, 1858; Tyaskin, Maryland, U.S.
- Died: July 23, 1920 (aged 62); Baltimore, Maryland, U.S.
- Batted: Left Threw: Right

MLB debut
- July 15, 1878, for the Cincinnati Reds

Last MLB appearance
- June 1, 1885, for the Buffalo Bisons

MLB statistics
- Batting average: .284
- Hits: 500
- Runs scored: 302
- Stats at Baseball Reference

Teams
- Cincinnati Reds (1878–1879); Troy Trojans (1880); Worcester Ruby Legs (1880–1881); Pittsburgh Alleghenys (1883); St. Louis Maroons (1884); Baltimore Orioles (1884); Louisville Eclipse (1884); Buffalo Bisons (1885)

Career highlights and awards
- Led NL in triples (1879)

Lewis Pessano "Buttercup" Dickerson (October 11, 1858 – July 23, 1920) was a 19th-century American Major League Baseball outfielder. Born in Tyaskin, Maryland, he played a total of seven seasons in the majors, splitting time between eight teams in three different leagues. He is credited by the National Italian American Sports Hall of Fame as the first Italian-American to play in the majors, but conversations with family members have called into question whether the family has any Italian ancestry.

== Early life ==
Dickerson was born in 1858. He is sometimes thought to be of Italian ancestry, but at least one historian and one family member dispute this notion. According to one of his granddaughters, he was born to William Porter Dickerson and Mary Larmore, who came to the United States from England, but who may have lived in Scotland before that. His granddaughter said that his middle name, Pessano, was given to him in honor of the physician who delivered him. She said that she was not aware of any Italian ancestry in the family.

== Career ==
In 1878, Dickerson began his career with the Cincinnati Reds at the age of 19, and played 29 games in the outfield, but did not find himself a regular starting position until the following year. In 1879, he took over the regular left field job after Charley Jones departed for the Boston Red Caps. That season proved to be his best in the majors; he batted .294, drove in 57 runs, and hit a league-leading 14 triples.

Dickerson departed the team the next season, moving on to the Troy Trojans, where he played mainly in center field. He relocated to the Worcester Ruby Legs later that season and split time in center with Harry Stovey. In 1881, he moved over to left field and had a very productive season, batting .316. He did not play in the majors again until 1883, playing 85 games with the Pittsburgh Alleghenys. His production went down significantly, and he hit just .249.

He played for four teams over the next two seasons. His best showing was with the St. Louis Maroons of the Union Association, when he hit .365 in 46 games in 1884. In 1885, he played in five games for the Buffalo Bisons before his career came to an end.

== Post-career ==
Dickerson died at the age of 62 in Baltimore, Maryland. He was interred at Loudon Park Cemetery in Baltimore. In 1979, he was inducted into the National Italian American Sports Hall of Fame.

== See also ==
- List of Major League Baseball annual triples leaders
- List of Major League Baseball single-game hits leaders
