= Home runs allowed =

Baseball statistic

In baseball statistics, home runs allowed (HRA) signifies the total number of home runs a pitcher allowed.

The Major League Baseball record for the most home runs allowed by any pitcher belongs to Jamie Moyer (522 in his career). He gave up home runs while pitching for eight different teams across both leagues. Warren Spahn gave up the most National League home runs (434) and the American League record is 422, held by Frank Tanana. The Minnesota Twins' Bert Blyleven set Major League Baseball's season record in 1986, allowing a total of 50 home runs to opposing batters.
