= Lee Richmond =

American baseball player (1857–1929)

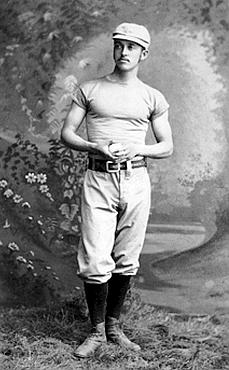
- Richmond, c. 1880
- Pitcher / Outfielder
- Born: May 5, 1857; Sheffield, Ohio, U.S.
- Died: October 1, 1929 (aged 72); Toledo, Ohio, U.S.
- Batted: Unknown Threw: Left

MLB debut
- September 27, 1879, for the Boston Red Stockings

Last MLB appearance
- October 4, 1886, for the Cincinnati Red Stockings

MLB statistics
- Win–loss record: 75–100
- Earned run average: 3.06
- Strikeouts: 552
- Batting average: .257
- Home runs: 3
- Runs batted in: 113
- Stats at Baseball Reference

Teams
- Boston Red Stockings (1879); Worcester Worcesters (1880–1882); Providence Grays (1883); Cincinnati Red Stockings (1886)

Career highlights and awards
- Pitched the first perfect game in MLB history on June 12, 1880

J. Lee Richmond (May 5, 1857 – October 1, 1929) was an American pitcher in Major League Baseball. He played for the Boston Red Stockings, Worcester Worcesters, Providence Grays, and Cincinnati Red Stockings, and is best known for pitching the first perfect game in Major League history. After retiring from baseball, he became a teacher.

== Early life ==
Lee Richmond was born on May 5, 1857, in Sheffield, Ohio, to Cyrus R. Richmond and Eliza Richmond (née Tinan). He was the son and grandson of Baptist ministers, and was the youngest of nine children. Richmond was raised in a farming community in Geneva, Ohio, and in 1873 attended a college preparatory academy affiliated with Oberlin College. It was here where Richmond first played baseball, alongside his brother Willis. For three years, Richmond pitched for both Oberlin's preparatory academy club and the school's college club. In 1876 he enrolled at Brown University, where he not only was elected class president, but also became a multisport athlete. He was a pitcher and outfielder for the school's baseball team, and played in Brown's first intercollegiate football games.

== Professional baseball career ==
On June 2, 1879, Richmond was paid $10 ($346 in current dollar terms) to pitch for Worcester of the National Baseball Association in an exhibition game against the Chicago White Stockings. He pitched a seven-inning no-hitter and signed with Worcester after the game. On July 28, he pitched a no-hitter against Springfield.

Worcester joined the National League in 1880, and Richmond signed with the team for $2,400 ($80,069 in current dollar terms) that season. Before a game against Cleveland on June 12, Richmond was up all night taking part in college graduation events, and he went to bed at 6:30 AM. He caught the 11:30 AM train for Worcester so he could pitch in the afternoon contest and then pitched a perfect game to beat Cleveland, 1–0. According to the Chicago Tribune, "The Clevelands were utterly helpless before Richmond's puzzling curves, retiring in every inning in one, two, three order, without a base hit. The Worcesters played a perfect fielding game." Cleveland pitcher Jim McCormick allowed three hits, and the only run was scored on a double error by second baseman Fred Dunlap.

Richmond graduated from Brown University four days after the perfect game, and he finished the year with a win–loss record of 32–32, a 2.15 earned run average, and 243 strikeouts in 590.2 innings pitched. He was the first left-handed pitcher to win 30 games in a season.

Richmond found success throwing an offspeed pitch that he termed a "half-stride ball" and that other players referred to as a "drop ball". He also had a rising fastball that he called a "jump ball". He also learned to throw a curveball in college, even though a Brown physics professor tried to convince him that nothing could make a ball curve in midair.

In both 1881 and 1882, Richmond pitched over 400 innings. After the 1882 season, the Worcester franchise disbanded, and Richmond played for the National League's Providence Grays in 1883. He experienced arm problems and was primarily an outfielder that year. He finished his MLB career with a record of 75–100, a 3.06 ERA, and 552 strikeouts.

== Later life ==
Throughout his baseball career, Richmond dedicated a sizable portion of his time to his medical studies. As baseball historian John Richmond Husman notes, "[...] baseball was the means to his end. He used it to finance his education." Four days after his perfect game, he graduated from Brown University with a Bachelor of Arts degree, and during the offseason for the next three years, continued his studies at the College of Physicians and Surgeons and University of the City of New-York. In 1883, he was awarded a Master of Arts from Brown and a medical degree from the University of the City of New-York. This made Richmond the first physician to play in a baseball league recognized by Major League Baseball.

After his retirement from baseball following the 1883 season, Richmond worked with his tutor Dr. C. T. Gardner in Providence, before returning to his home state of Ohio to set up a private practice facility in Conneaut. In 1886, Richmond attempted a brief, unsuccessful comeback with the Cincinnati Red Stockings of the American Association. He lost two of the three games he pitched in, and allowed 16 earned runs in 18 innings. Richmond then changed careers, and from 1890 to 1921, he was a high school chemistry teacher at Scott High School in Toledo, Ohio. Richmond married Mary Naomi Chapin, his former student, in 1892, and had three children: Ruth, Dorothy, and Jane. He died on October 1, 1929, at the age of 72.

== See also ==
- List of Major League Baseball perfect games
- List of Major League Baseball annual saves leaders

Achievements
| Preceded by George Bradley | No-hitter pitcher June 12, 1880 | Succeeded by John Montgomery Ward |
| Preceded by None | Perfect game pitcher June 12, 1880 | Succeeded by John Montgomery Ward |
