= Pud Galvin =

American baseball player (1856–1902)

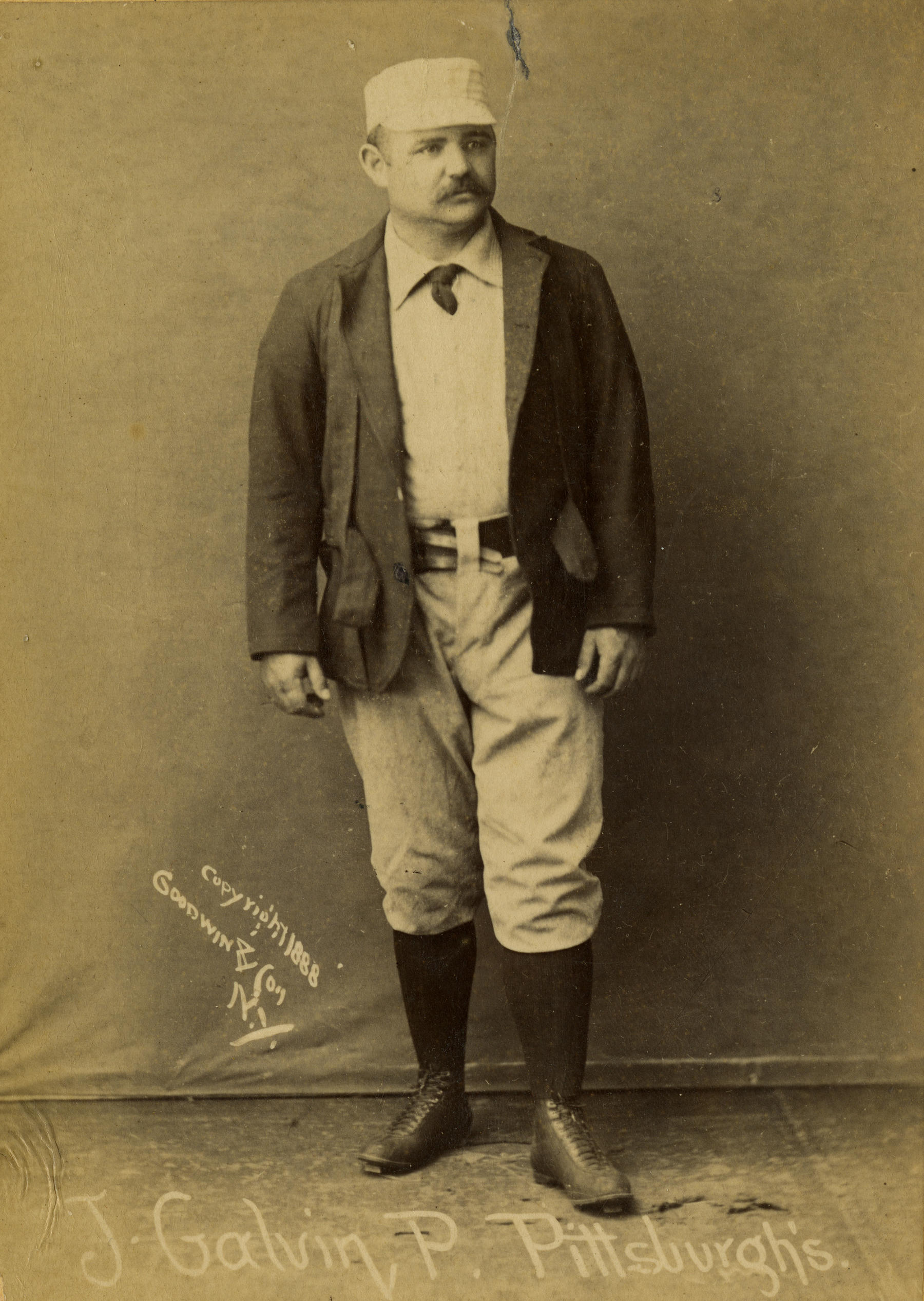
- Galvin, c. 1888
- Pitcher
- Born: December 25, 1856; St. Louis, Missouri, U.S.
- Died: March 7, 1902 (aged 45); Pittsburgh, Pennsylvania, U.S.
- Batted: Right Threw: Right

MLB debut
- May 22, 1875, for the St. Louis Brown Stockings

Last MLB appearance
- August 2, 1892, for the St. Louis Browns

MLB statistics
- Win–loss record: 365–310
- Earned run average: 2.85
- Strikeouts: 1,807
- Stats at Baseball Reference

Teams
- St. Louis Brown Stockings (1875); Buffalo Bisons (1879–1885); Pittsburgh Alleghenys (1885–1889); Pittsburgh Burghers (1890); Pittsburgh Pirates (1891–1892); St. Louis Browns (1892)

Career highlights and awards
- Pitched two no-hitters (1880, 1884)

Member of the National

Baseball Hall of Fame
- Induction: 1965
- Election method: Veterans Committee

James Francis "Pud" Galvin (December 25, 1856 – March 7, 1902) was an American professional baseball pitcher in the 19th century. He was the first 300-game winner in the major leagues and was posthumously inducted into the Baseball Hall of Fame in 1965.

In 1883, Galvin had 656 1/3 innings pitched (IP); the next season, he had 636 1/3 IP. These totals are the fifth and sixth most IP by a player in a single season, respectively. Additionally, Galvin had 20.5 wins above replacement in 1884, the most by a pitcher in a single season in MLB history.

== Baseball career ==
Galvin grew up in Kerry Patch, an Irish neighborhood in St. Louis. He debuted for St. Louis of the National Association in 1875, the franchise's inaugural season, and started eight games for the team. He spent the next 6 1/2 seasons with Buffalo in the International Association and later of the National League. In his first full major league season in 1879, Galvin had a win–loss record of 37–27 and a 2.28 earned run average (retroactively calculated; ERA was not an established statistic before the 20th century) in 593 innings pitched. On August 20, 1880, he became the first major league pitcher to throw a no-hitter on the road, leading his Buffalo Bisons to a 1–0 victory over the Worcester Worcesters. He pitched over 400 innings in 1880, 1881, and 1882. In 1883, Galvin went 46–29 with a 2.72 ERA, setting career highs in wins, games started (75), complete games (72), and innings pitched (656.1); he led the NL in the latter three categories. The following season, in 1884, he went 46–22 with a 1.99 ERA in 72 games started, 71 complete games, and 636.1 innings pitched.

Galvin was traded to the Pittsburgh Alleghenys midseason in 1885. He played for the Allegheny club from 1885 to 1889, pitching over 300 innings each year. He jumped to the Pittsburgh Burghers of the short-lived Players' League before the 1890 season and then returned to the Alleghenys (now named the Pirates) after the season. On June 14, 1892, Galvin was traded to the St. Louis Browns. He retired after the 1892 season, though he made a brief return to Buffalo (by this time a minor league franchise) in 1894.

Galvin played in an era where two-man pitching rotations were common — hence his 6,003 innings pitched and 646 complete games, both of which are second only to the career totals of Cy Young. Upon his retirement, Galvin held all-time records in several pitching categories, including wins, innings pitched, games started, games completed and shutouts. In 1888, he became the first 300-game winner in the major leagues. Galvin holds the record for most games started in a single season by a pitcher before 1893, 75 (tied with Will White). Galvin is the only player in baseball history to win 20 or more games in 10 different years without winning a pennant, finishing his career with a total of 365 wins and 310 losses.

The nickname "Pud" originated because Galvin was said to make hitters "look like pudding." Galvin was also nicknamed "the Little Steam Engine", a tribute to his power in spite of his small size. He was sometimes known as "Gentle Jeems" because of his kind disposition.

== Legacy ==
Galvin died poor at age 45 on March 7, 1902, in Pittsburgh, Pennsylvania, and, as a Roman Catholic, is buried in Calvary Catholic Cemetery. He was posthumously elected to the Baseball Hall of Fame in 1965 by the Veterans Committee. In honor of his achievements in Buffalo, Galvin was inducted into the Buffalo Baseball Hall of Fame in 1985.

A 2006 NPR article referred to Galvin as "the first baseball player to be widely known for using a performance-enhancing substance." The Washington Post reported that Galvin used the Brown-Séquard elixir, which contained monkey testosterone, before a single game in 1889. However, no one seemed bothered by the use of the elixir, and the newspaper practically endorsed it after the game, saying that Galvin's performance was "the best proof yet furnished of the value of the discovery."

== See also ==
- 300 win club
- List of Major League Baseball career wins leaders
- List of Major League Baseball career shutout leaders
- List of Major League Baseball annual shutout leaders
- List of Major League Baseball no-hitters
- List of Major League Baseball player-managers

Achievements
Preceded by Larry Corcoran; Larry Corcoran	No-hitter pitcher August 19, 1880; August 4, 1884	Succeeded by Tony Mullane; Dick Burns
