= Providence Grays all-time roster =

List of baseball players

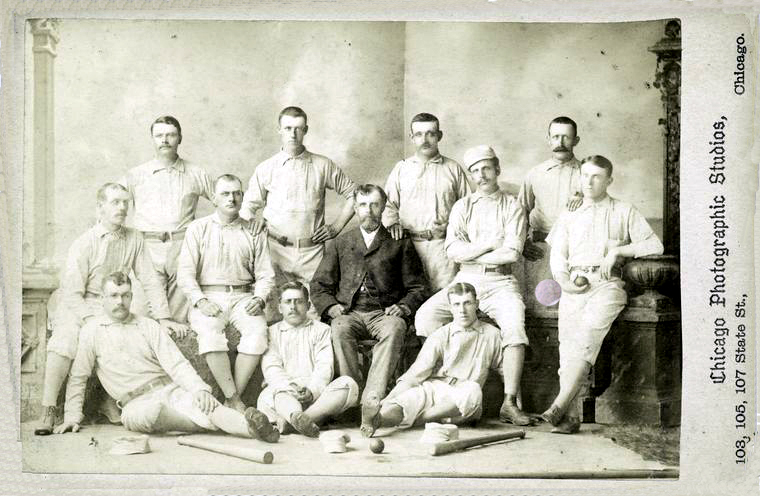
1882 Providence Grays

The Providence Grays were a Major League Baseball franchise based in Providence, Rhode Island from 1878 to 1885. During the team's eight seasons in the National League (NL), which then comprised eight teams, they finished third place or higher in the final standings seven times, and won the league championship in both 1879 and 1884. Providence played their home games at the Messer Street Grounds, which was located in the Olneyville neighborhood of Providence. The Grays were officially organized on January 16, 1878 by Benjamin Douglas, who became the team's general manager. Henry Root was hired as the team president‚ and Tom Carey was initially hired to be the on-field captain, whose duties were similar to the modern-day manager. On January 21, 1878, Providence applied for membership in the NL, and was officially approved on February 6. On April 10, Root took over ownership of the team, fired Douglas for incompetence and insubordination, and hired Tom York to replace Carey as captain.

Providence was successful in signing several star players for their inaugural season: Paul Hines had played the previous four seasons with the Chicago White Stockings; Tom Carey was signed after the Hartford Dark Blues folded; Doug Allison was the catcher for the 1869 Cincinnati Red Stockings, who had an 84-game winning streak from 1869 to 1870; and John Montgomery Ward, who was playing his first season in the major leagues. Ward had a win–loss record of 22–13 and Hines led the league in home runs, runs batted in (RBIs), and batting average as the Grays finished in third place among the six teams in the NL for the 1878 season, with a record of 33 wins, 27 losses, and 2 ties. The Grays won the NL championship in 1879, placing first among the league's eight teams with Ward winning 47 games as their starting pitcher, and the leadership of George Wright, who played second base and also managed. The team had a strong hitting line-up with Hines' league leading .357 batting average, as well as new additions Jim O'Rourke and Joe Start, who both had batting averages over .300. William Edward White, a Brown University player who played one game for the Grays on June 21, 1879, may have been the first African-American to play at the major league level; according to Peter Morris of the Society for American Baseball Research, the evidence for White is strong, but not conclusive. If this claim is true, then White pre-dated both Moses Fleetwood Walker and his brother Weldy Walker, who both played for the 1884 Toledo Blue Stockings of the American Association (AA). In 1880, the Grays finished in second place among the eight NL teams, with Ward winning 39 games. On June 17 of that year, Ward pitched the second perfect game in major league history.

For the 1881 season, the Grays signed pitcher Charles Radbourn, who split the starting duties with Ward over the next two seasons. Radbourn won 25 games in 1881 and 33 more in 1882, while Ward won 18 and 19 respectively. In 1882, the Grays hired Harry Wright to be their manager, who brought back his brother George to play shortstop. They placed second in the NL standings, behind the White Stockings, for the third straight season. In 1883, the team dropped to third place, though Radbourn was credited with 48 victories and on July 25, he threw a no-hitter. Harry Wright left the team before the 1884 season, and was replaced by Frank Bancroft. On June 7, 1884, pitcher Charlie Sweeney struck out 19 batters in a nine-inning game, the unofficial record that stood until Roger Clemens surpassed that total with 20 in a game on April 29, 1986. On July 22, manager Brancroft wanted to replace Sweeney in the line-up with right fielder and alternate pitcher Cyclone Miller, but Sweeney refused the move and left the game. He was suspended without pay, but quit the team instead and signed to play for the St. Louis Maroons of the Union Association (UA). Without any other viable long-term pitching options, this result forced Radbourn to pitch nearly every game for the remainder of the season. Not only did Radbourn finish with 59 victories, an all-time record, but he also led the league in many pitching categories including strikeouts and earned run average, winning the triple crown. His leadership on the field led the team to their second and last NL championship; later besting the New York Metropolitans 3 games to zero in the 1884 World Series. The Grays' final season was in 1885, a season in which they finished at their lowest position in the standings in their history, as well as having their worst winning percentage. Following the 1885 season, the owner of the Boston Beaneaters, Arthur Soden bought the team and its players for $6000.

== Keys ==
Abbreviations
| Name | Name of the player by official records |
| Position | Position that player played in the field |
| Seasons played | The seasons played for this franchise by the player |
| † | Elected to the Baseball Hall of Fame |
| § | Indicates that player was a player-manager |
| † § | Indicates the player was both a player-manager and Hall of Famer |

Position
| C | Catcher | 1B | First baseman |
| 2B | Second baseman | 3B | Third baseman |
| SS | Shortstop | IF | Infielder |
| LF | Left fielder | CF | Center fielder |
| RF | Right fielder | OF | Outfielder |
| SP | Starting pitcher | RP | Relief pitcher |

== Players ==
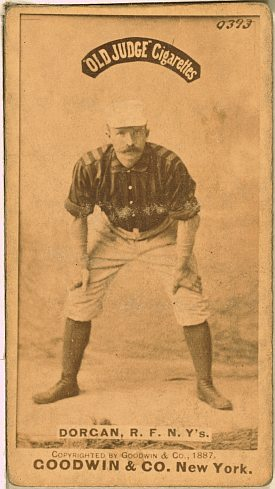
Player-manager Mike Dorgan

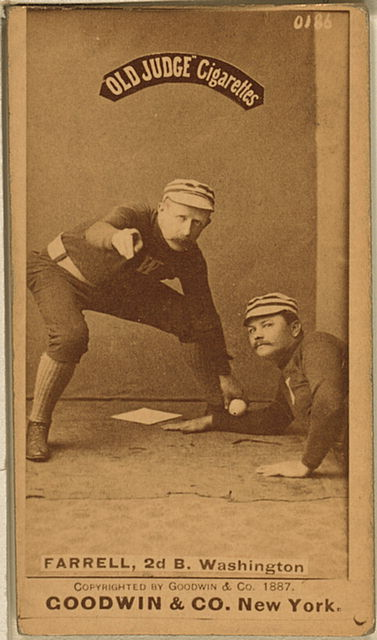
Player-manager Jack Farrell

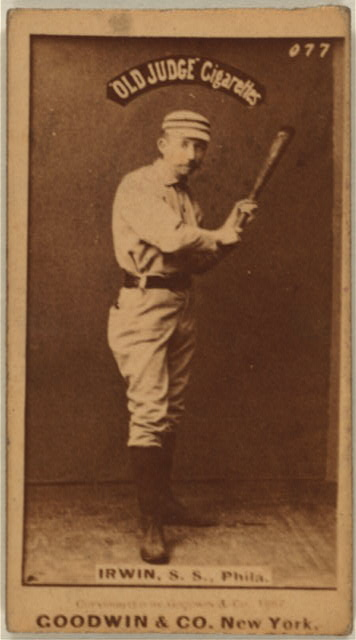
Shortstop Arthur Irwin

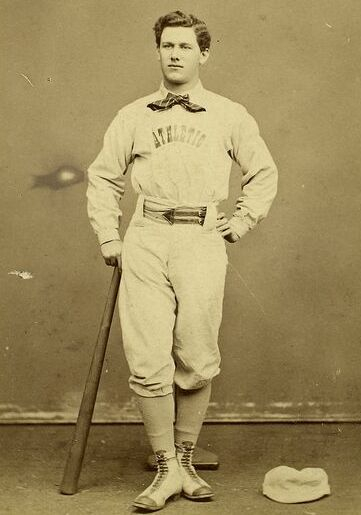
First baseman Tim Murnane later became an award-winning baseball writer for The Boston Globe.

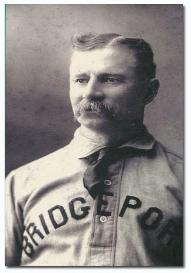
Right fielder and first baseman Jim O'Rourke

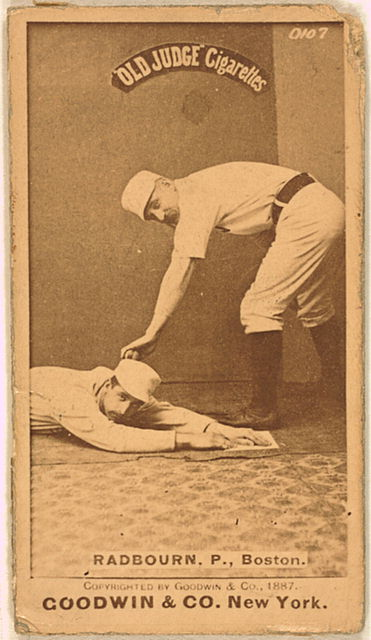
Starting pitcher Charles Radbourn

Right fielder Paul Radford

First baseman Joe Start

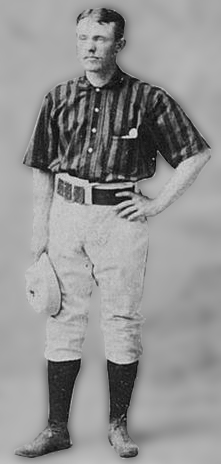
Starting pitcher John Montgomery Ward

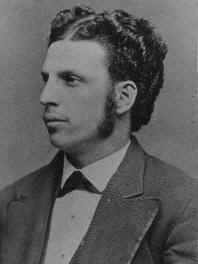
Player-manager George Wright

| Player | Position | Seasons | Notes | Ref |
|---|---|---|---|---|
| Doug Allison | C | 1878–1879 | In 1878, he was the back-up catcher to Lew Brown, and played in one game for the 1879 team. | |
| Wiman Andrus | 3B | 1885 | His major league career consisted of a single game for the 1885 team. | |
| Harry Arundel | SP | 1884 | He pitched one game for the Grays, an 11–2 win over the Cleveland Blues. | |
| Charley Bassett | IF | 1884–1885 | Bassett was used as a back-up infielder during his two seasons in Providence. | |
| George Bradley | 3B / SP / RP | 1880 | During his lone season with the Grays, he was the starting third baseman, and was used as the alternate pitcher when John Montgomery Ward needed a rest. | |
| Lew Brown | C | 1878–1879, 1881 | He was the starting catcher for the 1878 Grays, as well as 1879, until Emil Gross took over as the starter. Brown was sent to the Chicago White Stockings late into the 1879 season, and returned to the team as a reserve catcher in 1881. | |
| Tom Carey | SS | 1878 | He was the starting shortstop for the 1878 Grays, batted .237, and scored 30 runs. | |
| Cliff Carroll | LF | 1882–1885 | He began his career for the 1882 Grays, and became the starting left fielder for the 1884 Grays. He stayed in that position through the 1885 season. | |
| John Cassidy | RF | 1883 | In 1883, he played his only season in Providence, and was the starting right fielder. | |
| John Cattanach | SP | 1884 | He pitched in one game for Providence, and two for the St. Louis Browns during his only season in the majors. | |
| Ed Conley | SP | 1884 | He pitched in eight games for the 1884 Grays, and had a 4–4 win–loss record, with a 2.12 earned run average. It was his only season in the majors. | |
| Fred Corey | SP | 1878 | In his first major league season, Corey pitched in five games for the 1878 Grays, and played two other games at second base. | |
| Ed Crane | LF | 1885 | Although he was known as a pitcher, he played left field in the only game he played for the Grays. | |
| Con Daily | C | 1885 | Daily, in his only season for the Grays, was the back-up catcher to Barney Gilligan. | |
| Jerry Denny | 3B | 1881–1885 | During his five seasons for the Grays, he led all NL third basemen in several fielding categories; in games played twice, putouts twice, and fielding percentage once. | |
| Mike Dorgan^{§} | RF | 1880 | Dorgan started in right field, and finished the season as their manager, with the team winning 26 of the final 39 games under his leadership. | |
| Jack Farrell^{§} | 2B | 1879–1885 | Farrell was the starting second baseman for the Grays from 1880 to 1885. In 1883, he led the league in fielding percentage among second basemen. | |
| Cherokee Fisher | SP | 1878 | In his only game with the Grays, he pitched a complete game loss against the Cincinnati Reds on July 9. This was the last game he played at the major league level. | |
| John Foley | SP | 1885 | Foley pitched a complete game loss against the St. Louis Maroons on September 18, his only major league appearance. | |
| Barney Gilligan | C | 1881–1885 | After splitting time at catcher with Emil Gross in 1881, he became the starter in 1882 and held the position through the 1885 season. | |
| Emil Gross | C | 1879–1881 | After splitting time at catcher with Lew Brown in 1879, he became the starter in 1880 and led the league in games played. He played another season in Providence, splitting time with Barney Gilligan. | |
| Bill Hague | 3B | 1878–1879 | In 1878, he was a starter while leading the league in assists and fielding percentage as a third baseman. | |
| Charlie Hallstrom | SP | 1885 | Hallstrom pitched a complete game loss, on September 23 against the Chicago White Stockings. He is credited as the first person born in Sweden to play in the major leagues. | |
| Tom Healey | SP | 1878 | He pitched in three games for Grays before finishing the season for the Indianapolis Blues. It was his only season in the major leagues. | |
| Dick Higham | RF | 1878 | In his last full season as a player, Higham was the starting right fielder, and led the league in doubles and runs scored. | |
| Mike Hines | C | 1885 | In a four-season career, he played mainly for the Boston Beaneaters, but during the 1885 season, he played in one game for the Grays. | |
| Paul Hines | CF | 1878–1885 | Hines played in each season the Providence Grays franchise was in the league. He is the Grays' all-time leader in games played with 705, and nearly all offensive categories. In 1878, he led the league in home runs, RBIs, and batting average, known later as baseball's triple crown. | |
| Sadie Houck | LF | 1880 | Houck played in 49 games with the Grays, and had a batting average of .201, while playing mostly in left field. | |
| Arthur Irwin | SS | 1883–1885 | Irwin played three seasons for the Grays as their starting shortstop. In 1883, he collected 116 hits and had a batting average of .286; both were his career highs. He broke a finger during the 1885 season, which he protected with a padded fielding glove. It is believed to be the first glove used in league play, other than ones used by catchers and first basemen. | |
| Rudy Kemmler | C | 1879 | Kemmler played in two games with the 1879 Grays, and collected one hit in seven at bats. | |
| Sam Kimber | SP | 1885 | In his only game for the Grays, he pitched a complete game loss against the Detroit Wolverines on September 29. It was his last game in major league play. | |
| Lon Knight | RF | 1885 | | |
| Denny Lyons | 3B | 1885 | In the first of his 13-season career he played four games at third base, and collected two hits in 16 at bats. | |
| Tim Manning | SS | 1882, 1885 | Manning had two different stints in Providence. He played in 21 games in 1882, and 17 in 1885. Combined, he collected 10 hits in 111 at bats for a .090 batting average for the Grays. | |
| Bobby Mathews | SP | 1879, 1881 | Mathews played a full season for the Grays in 1879 and had a win–loss record of 12–6. He then returned for a partial season in 1881, winning four games against eight losses. | |
| Bill McClellan | SS / RF | 1881 | He was the starting shortstop during his only season with the Grays. | |
| Jim McCormick | SP | 1885 | McCormick collected one of his 265 career wins while playing for the Grays. He was sold to the Chicago White Stockings by early July. | |
| Mike McGeary^{§} | 2B / 3B | 1879–1880 | He played two seasons with the Grays. In 1879, he led the National League in games played, then was named player-manager for the 1880 season. Soon after the season began, McGeary was replaced as manager and released from the team. Later in the season, the Cleveland Blues hired him as both player and manager. | |
| Cyclone Miller | SP / RP | 1884 | In 1884, Miller was a well-travelled pitcher, with Providence being the second of three major league teams he played for that season. During his time with the Grays, he pitched in six games, had a win–loss record of 3–2, and a 2.08 earned run average. | |
| Joe Mulvey | SS | 1883 | In the first of Mulvey's 12 major league seasons, he appeared in four games, and had a .125 batting average. | |
| Tim Murnane | 1B | 1878 | In his only season with the Grays, Murnane was their starting first baseman. This was his last major league season before reappearing with the Boston Reds of the Union Association in 1884. He later became a long-time sportswriter for The Boston Globe and was enshrined into the Honor Rolls of Baseball by the Baseball Hall of Fame in 1946. | |
| Miah Murray | C | 1884 | He played in eight games, and had a .185 batting average. | |
| Henry Myers | SS | 1881 | He played in one game for the Grays, and had no hits in four at bats. | |
| Sandy Nava | SS | 1882–1884 | He played three seasons for the Grays as their back-up catcher. Nava is the first known Mexican American and second Hispanic baseball player to play at the major league level. | |
| Tricky Nichols | SP | 1878 | In his only season playing for Providence, Nichols had a 4–7 win–loss record and a 4.22 earned run average. | |
| Dan O'Leary | RF | 1879 | O'Leary played in two games for the Grays, and collected three hits in seven at bats. | |
| Jim O'Rourke^{†} | RF / 1B | 1879 | Baseball Hall of Famer O'Rourke had a batting average of .348, and led the National League with a .371 on-base percentage during his only season with the Grays. | |
| John Peters | SS | 1880 | During his only season with the Grays, Peters led all National League shortstops in games played, putouts, and fielding percentage. | |
| Lip Pike | 2B | 1878 | He played in five games for the Grays, and had a batting average of .227 in 22 at bats. | |
| Charles Radbourn^{†} | SP / RF | 1881–1885 | Baseball Hall of Famer Radbourn is the Grays' all-time leader in nearly all major pitching categories. He played 5 seasons for the Grays, during which he led the NL in several seasonal pitching categories, including an all-time leading 59 wins in 1884. | |
| Paul Radford | RF | 1884–1885 | He was the Grays' starting right fielder for two seasons. | |
| Charlie Reilley | C | 1882 | He played in three games for the Grays, and had a batting average of .182 in 11 at bats. | |
| Lee Richmond | LF / SP | 1883 | A starting pitcher during the bulk of his career, he played mainly in left field for the Grays. | |
| Ed Seward | RP | 1885 | Seward pitched six innings in relief on September 30, his only game for the Grays. | |
| Dupee Shaw | SP | 1885 | Shaw pitched in 49 games during his only season with the Grays. He completed 47 of his 49 starts, had an earned run average of 2.47, struck out 194 batters in 399.2 innings, and a 23–26 win–loss record. | |
| Edgar Smith | SP / LF | 1883, 1885 | During Smith's two seasons with the Grays, he played in a total of three games. | |
| Joe Start | 1B | 1879–1885 | Start was the starting first baseman for the Grays for the final seven seasons of the franchise. He twice led NL first basemen in putouts and fielding percentage. | |
| Bill Stellberger | SP | 1885 | Stellberger pitched a complete game loss on October 1, against the Detroit Wolverines, his only game with the Grays. | |
| Denny Sullivan | 3B | 1879 | He played his first of two major league seasons for the Grays. In five games played, he batted .263 in 19 at bats. | |
| Charlie Sweasy | 2B | 1878 | He played his final season in the major leagues for the Grays. In 55 games played, he had a .175 batting average. | |
| Charlie Sweeney | SP | 1882–1884 | Sweeney had a 17–8 win–loss record when he left the field and later quit the team for being relieved from the game as the pitcher. His absence from the team for the remainder of the season left Charles Radbourn as the only viable starting pitcher on the team. Radbourn finished the season with all-time record for wins in a season with 59. | |
| Dasher Troy | SS | 1882 | He played in four games during his lone season with the Grays, and batted .235 in 17 at bats. | |
| John Montgomery Ward^{†§} | SP / IF / RF | 1878–1882 | The first five seasons of Ward's Hall of Fame career were spent with the Grays. He led the NL in earned run average in 1878, and in 1879, he led the league in pitching wins. | |
| John Ward | SP | 1885 | He pitched in one game for the Grays, a complete game loss on September 19 to the St. Louis Browns. | |
| Harry Wheeler | SP | 1878 | During his lone season with the Grays, he pitched in seven games, completed all six of his starts and had a 6–1 win–loss record. | |
| William Edward White | 1B | 1879 | He played in one game for the Grays, and had one hit in four at bats. Evidence suggests that White was the first African-American to have played in the major leagues, pre-dating the Walker brothers, who played for the Toledo Blue Stockings in 1884. | |
| Art Whitney | SS | 1882 | During his lone season with the Grays, he collected three hits in 40 at bats, and was released from the team in June. | |
| George Wright^{†§} | SS | 1879, 1882 | The first of Hall of Famer George Wright's two, one-year, stints with the Grays was in 1879, when he was the team's player-manager for its first NL championship season. He then left the team, but returned in June 1882, the final season of his career. | |
| Tom York^{§} | LF | 1878–1882 | York was the Grays' left fielder for the first five seasons of their existence, and had two different stints as their player-manager. | |
