= 1879 Syracuse Stars season =

1879 Syracuse Stars
- League: National League
- Ballpark: Newell Park
- City: Syracuse, New York
- Record: 22–48 (.314)
- League place: 7th
- Managers: Mike Dorgan, Bill Holbert, Jimmy Macullar

After finishing in second place in the International Association in 1878, the Syracuse Stars joined the rival National League for the 1879 baseball season. However, on September 10, with a seventh-place 22–48 record, they folded operations with a handful of games remaining.

== Regular season ==
=== Season standings ===
National League
Team	W	L	Pct.	GB	Home	Road
Providence Grays	59	25	.702	—	34‍–‍8	25‍–‍17
Boston Red Caps	54	30	.643	5	29‍–‍13	25‍–‍17
Buffalo Bisons	46	32	.590	10	23‍–‍16	23‍–‍16
Chicago White Stockings	46	33	.582	10½	29‍–‍13	17‍–‍20
Cincinnati Reds	43	37	.537	14	21‍–‍16	22‍–‍21
Cleveland Blues	27	55	.329	31	15‍–‍27	12‍–‍28
Syracuse Stars	22	48	.314	30	11‍–‍22	11‍–‍26
Troy Trojans	19	56	.253	35½	12‍–‍27	7‍–‍29

=== Record vs. opponents ===
1879 National League record Sources:
Team	BOS	BUF	CHI	CIN	CLE	PRV	SYR	TRO
Boston	—	9–3	4–8	7–5	10–2	4–8	9–3	11–1
Buffalo	3–9	—	6–6–1	7–3	8–4	6–6	5–3	11–1
Chicago	8–4	6–6–1	—	3–8	8–4	5–7–1	8–1	8–3–2
Cincinnati	5–7	3–7	8–3	—	8–4	2–10	8–4–1	9–2
Cleveland	2–10	4–8	4–8	4–8	—	4–8	4–7	5–6
Providence	8–4	6–6	7–5–1	10–2	8–4	—	10–2	10–2
Syracuse	3–9	3–5	1–8	4–8–1	7–4	2–10	—	2–4
Troy	1–11	1–11	3–8–2	2–9	6–5	2–10	4–2	—

=== Roster ===
1879 Syracuse Stars
Roster
Pitchers: Harry McCormick; Catchers: Bill Holbert; Kick Kelly	Infielders: George Adams; Jack Allen; Hick Carpenter; George Creamer; Mike Dorgan; Jack Farrell; Jimmy Macullar; John McGuinness; Red Woodhead	Outfielders: Frank Decker; Mike Mansell; Tom Mansell; Charlie Osterhout; Blondie Purcell; John Richmond	Manager: Mike Dorgan; Bill Holbert; Jimmy Macullar

== Player stats ==
=== Batting ===
==== Starters by position ====
Note: Pos = Position; G = Games played; AB = At bats; H = Hits; Avg. = Batting average; HR = Home runs; RBI = Runs batted in

Pos	Player	G	AB	H	Avg.	HR	RBI
C	Bill Holbert	59	229	46	.201	0	21
1B	Hick Carpenter	65	261	53	.203	0	20
2B	Jack Farrell	54	241	73	.303	1	21
3B	Red Woodhead	34	131	21	.160	0	2
SS	Jimmy Macullar	64	246	52	.211	0	13
OF	Mike Mansell	67	242	52	.215	1	13
OF	Blondie Purcell	63	277	72	.260	0	25
OF	John Richmond	62	254	54	.213	1	23

==== Other batters ====
Note: G = Games played; AB = At bats; H = Hits; Avg. = Batting average; HR = Home runs; RBI = Runs batted in

Player	G	AB	H	Avg.	HR	RBI
Mike Dorgan	59	270	72	.267	1	17
George Creamer	15	60	13	.217	0	3
John McGuinness	12	51	15	.294	0	4
Jack Allen	11	48	9	.188	0	3
Kick Kelly	10	36	4	.111	0	2
George Adams	4	13	3	.231	0	0
Frank Decker	3	10	1	.100	0	0
Charlie Osterhout	2	8	0	.000	0	0
Tom Mansell	1	4	1	.250	0	0

=== Pitching ===
==== Starting pitchers ====
Note: G = Games pitched; IP = Innings pitched; W = Wins; L = Losses; ERA = Earned run average; SO = Strikeouts

Player	G	IP	W	L	ERA	SO
Harry McCormick	54	457.1	18	33	2.99	96
Blondie Purcell	22	179.2	4	15	3.76	28

==== Relief pitchers ====
Note: G = Games pitched; W = Wins; L = Losses; SV = Saves; ERA = Earned run average; SO = Strikeouts

Player	G	W	L	SV	ERA	SO
Mike Dorgan	2	0	0	0	2.25	8
