= 1879 Troy Trojans season =

1879 Troy Trojans
- League: National League
- Ballpark: Putnam Grounds
- City: Troy, New York
- Record: 19–56 (.253)
- League place: 8th
- Managers: Horace Phillips, Bob Ferguson

The 1879 season was the National League debut for the Troy Trojans. They finished the season 19–56, last in the league.

== Regular season ==
=== Season standings ===
National League
Team	W	L	Pct.	GB	Home	Road
Providence Grays	59	25	.702	—	34‍–‍8	25‍–‍17
Boston Red Caps	54	30	.643	5	29‍–‍13	25‍–‍17
Buffalo Bisons	46	32	.590	10	23‍–‍16	23‍–‍16
Chicago White Stockings	46	33	.582	10½	29‍–‍13	17‍–‍20
Cincinnati Reds	43	37	.537	14	21‍–‍16	22‍–‍21
Cleveland Blues	27	55	.329	31	15‍–‍27	12‍–‍28
Syracuse Stars	22	48	.314	30	11‍–‍22	11‍–‍26
Troy Trojans	19	56	.253	35½	12‍–‍27	7‍–‍29

=== Record vs. opponents ===
1879 National League record Sources:
Team	BSN	BUF	CHI	CIN	CLE	PRO	SYR	TRO
Boston	—	9–3	4–8	7–5	10–2	4–8	9–3	11–1
Buffalo	3–9	—	6–6–1	7–3	8–4	6–6	5–3	11–1
Chicago	8–4	6–6–1	—	3–8	8–4	5–7–1	8–1	8–3–2
Cincinnati	5–7	3–7	8–3	—	8–4	2–10	8–4–1	9–2
Cleveland	2–10	4–8	4–8	4–8	—	4–8	4–7	5–6
Providence	8–4	6–6	7–5–1	10–2	8–4	—	10–2	10–2
Syracuse	3–9	3–5	1–8	4–8–1	7–4	2–10	—	2–4
Troy	1–11	1–11	3–8–2	2–9	6–5	2–10	4–2	—

=== Roster ===
1879 Troy Trojans
Roster
Pitchers: George Bradley; Gid Gardner; Fred Goldsmith; Pat McManus; Harry Salisbury; Catchers: Bill Holbert; Kick Kelly; Charlie Reilley	Infielders: Dan Brouthers; Ed Caskin; Aaron Clapp; Herm Doscher; Bob Ferguson; Thorny Hawkes; Candy Nelson; John Shoupe	Outfielders: John Cassidy; Jake Evans; Al Hall; Tom Mansell; Live Oak Taylor	Manager: Bob Ferguson; Horace Phillips

== Player stats ==
=== Batting ===
==== Starters by position ====
Note: Pos = Position; G = Games played; AB = At bats; H = Hits; Avg. = Batting average; HR = Home runs; RBI = Runs batted in

Pos	Player	G	AB	H	Avg.	HR	RBI
C	Charlie Reilley	62	236	54	.229	0	19
1B	Dan Brouthers	39	168	46	.274	4	17
2B	Thorny Hawkes	64	250	52	.208	0	20
3B	Herm Doscher	47	191	42	.220	0	18
SS	Ed Caskin	70	304	78	.257	0	21
OF	Jake Evans	72	280	65	.232	0	17
OF	Al Hall	67	306	79	.258	0	14
OF	Tom Mansell	40	177	43	.243	0	11

==== Other batters ====
Note: G = Games played; AB = At bats; H = Hits; Avg. = Batting average; HR = Home runs; RBI = Runs batted in

Player	G	AB	H	Avg.	HR	RBI
Aaron Clapp	36	146	39	.267	0	18
Bob Ferguson	30	123	31	.252	0	4
Candy Nelson	28	106	28	.264	0	10
Live Oak Taylor	24	97	21	.216	0	8
John Shoupe	11	44	4	.091	0	1
John Cassidy	9	37	7	.189	0	1
Kick Kelly	6	22	5	.227	0	0
Bill Holbert	4	15	4	.267	0	2

=== Pitching ===
==== Starting pitchers ====
Note: G = Games pitched; IP = Innings pitched; W = Wins; L = Losses; ERA = Earned run average; SO = Strikeouts

Player	G	IP	W	L	ERA	SO
George Bradley	54	487.0	13	40	2.85	133
Harry Salisbury	10	89.0	4	6	2.22	31
Fred Goldsmith	8	63.0	2	4	1.57	31
Pat McManus	2	21.0	0	2	3.00	6
Gid Gardner	2	14.0	0	2	5.79	3

==== Other pitchers ====
Note: G = Games pitched; IP = Innings pitched; W = Wins; L = Losses; ERA = Earned run average; SO = Strikeouts

Player	G	IP	W	L	ERA	SO
Dan Brouthers	3	21.0	0	2	5.57	6
