= 1879 Cincinnati Reds season =

1879 Cincinnati Reds
- League: National League
- Ballpark: Avenue Grounds
- City: Cincinnati
- Record: 43–37 (.538)
- League place: 5th
- Managers: Cal McVey, Deacon White

The 1879 Cincinnati Reds season was a season in American baseball. The team finished fifth in the National League with a record of 43–37, 14 games behind the Providence Grays.

== Regular season ==
The Reds were hoping to build off a great 1878 season, in which the team finished in second place in the National League with a 37–23 record. In the off-season, the Reds announced that catcher Deacon White would become the player-manager. Cincinnati signed Ross Barnes to play shortstop. Barnes had missed most of the 1877 season and all of the 1878 season after falling ill. In his last full season in 1876, Barnes played with the Chicago White Stockings, and led the NL with a .429 batting average, 138 hits, 126 runs, 38 doubles, and fourteen triples.

King Kelly had a very solid season, hitting .348 with two home runs and 47 RBI, while another youngster, twenty-year-old Buttercup Dickerson, hit .291 with two home runs and a team high 57 RBI. Deacon White rebounded from a poor 1878 season by his standards, as he hit .330 with a homer and 52 RBI. On the mound, Will White led the NL with 75 starts, as he had a 43–31 record with a 1.99 ERA in his league high 680 innings pitched.

=== Season summary ===
Cincinnati started off hot, as they opened the season with a five-game winning streak. However, the club lost seven of their next eight games to fall under .500. Cincinnati had a mediocre 9–9 record after eighteen games, and player-manager Deacon White turned over his managerial duties to Cal McVey, who had been the Reds' player-manager in 1878. Cincinnati lost the first five games under McVey, however, the team began to play better, and ended the season with a 43–37 record, fifth in the league, and fourteen games behind the first-place Grays.

=== Season standings ===
National League
Team	W	L	Pct.	GB	Home	Road
Providence Grays	59	25	.702	—	34‍–‍8	25‍–‍17
Boston Red Caps	54	30	.643	5	29‍–‍13	25‍–‍17
Buffalo Bisons	46	32	.590	10	23‍–‍16	23‍–‍16
Chicago White Stockings	46	33	.582	10½	29‍–‍13	17‍–‍20
Cincinnati Reds	43	37	.537	14	21‍–‍16	22‍–‍21
Cleveland Blues	27	55	.329	31	15‍–‍27	12‍–‍28
Syracuse Stars	22	48	.314	30	11‍–‍22	11‍–‍26
Troy Trojans	19	56	.253	35½	12‍–‍27	7‍–‍29

=== Record vs. opponents ===
1879 National League record Sources:
Team	BSN	BUF	CHI	CIN	CLE	PRO	SYR	TRO
Boston	—	9–3	4–8	7–5	10–2	4–8	9–3	11–1
Buffalo	3–9	—	6–6–1	7–3	8–4	6–6	5–3	11–1
Chicago	8–4	6–6–1	—	3–8	8–4	5–7–1	8–1	8–3–2
Cincinnati	5–7	3–7	8–3	—	8–4	2–10	8–4–1	9–2
Cleveland	2–10	4–8	4–8	4–8	—	4–8	4–7	5–6
Providence	8–4	6–6	7–5–1	10–2	8–4	—	10–2	10–2
Syracuse	3–9	3–5	1–8	4–8–1	7–4	2–10	—	2–4
Troy	1–11	1–11	3–8–2	2–9	6–5	2–10	4–2	—

=== Game log ===
Legend
Reds Win	Reds Loss	Game Tied/Postponed

1879 Game Log: 43–37 (Home: 21–16; Away: 22–21)
May: 8–7 (Home: 6–6; Away: 2–1)

#	Date	Opponent	Score	Stadium	Attendance	Record	Streak
1	May 1	Trojans	7–5	Avenue Grounds	N/A	1–0	W1
2	May 2	Trojans	10–1	Avenue Grounds	N/A	2–0	W2
3	May 3	Trojans	13–12	Avenue Grounds	N/A	3–0	W3
4	May 6	Stars	7–6	Avenue Grounds	N/A	4–0	W4
5	May 8	Stars	5–2	Avenue Grounds	N/A	5–0	W5
6	May 10	Stars	6–7	Avenue Grounds	N/A	5–1	L1
7	May 13	Red Caps	2–3	Avenue Grounds	N/A	5–2	L2
8	May 15	Red Caps	2–13	Avenue Grounds	N/A	5–3	L3
9	May 17	Red Caps	7–4	Avenue Grounds	N/A	6–3	W1
10	May 20	Grays	5–11	Avenue Grounds	N/A	6–4	L1
11	May 22	Grays	9–10	Avenue Grounds	N/A	6–5	L2
12	May 24	Grays	1–17	Avenue Grounds	N/A	6–6	L3
13	May 28	@ Trojans	6–20	Putnam Grounds	N/A	6–7	L4
14	May 30	@ Trojans	4–2	Putnam Grounds	N/A	7–7	W1
15	May 31	@ Trojans	6–2	Putnam Grounds	N/A	8–7	W2

June: 2–10 (Home: 1–1; Away: 1–9)

#	Date	Opponent	Score	Stadium	Attendance	Record	Streak
–	June 3	@ Stars	Postponed (rain); Makeup: June 4				
16	June 4	@ Stars	6–5	Newell Park	N/A	9–7	W3
17	June 5	@ Stars	1–10	Newell Park	N/A	9–8	L1
18	June 7	@ Stars	3–9	Newell Park	N/A	9–9	L2
19	June 10	@ Grays	1–6	Messer Street Grounds	N/A	9–10	L3
–	June 12	@ Grays	Postponed (rain); Makeup: June 13				
20	June 13	@ Grays	6–19	Messer Street Grounds	N/A	9–11	L4
21	June 14	@ Grays	3–4	Messer Street Grounds	N/A	9–12	L5
22	June 17	@ Red Caps	6–9	South End Grounds	N/A	9–13	L6
23	June 19	@ Red Caps	0–6	South End Grounds	N/A	9–14	L7
24	June 21	@ Red Caps	15–13	South End Grounds	N/A	10–14	W1
25	June 24	White Stockings	4–1	Avenue Grounds	N/A	11–14	W2
26	June 25	White Stockings	3–7	Avenue Grounds	N/A	11–15	L1
27	June 28	@ White Stockings	1–5	Lakefront Park	N/A	11–16	L2
–	June 30	@ White Stockings	Postponed (unknown reason); Makeup: July 1				

July: 11–7 (Home: 7–6; Away: 4–1)

#	Date	Opponent	Score	Stadium	Attendance	Record	Streak
28	July 1	@ White Stockings	7–5	Lakefront Park	N/A	12–16	W1
29	July 2	@ White Stockings	9–8	Lakefront Park	N/A	13–16	W2
30	July 4	Stars	9–1	Avenue Grounds	N/A	14–16	W3
31	July 5	Stars	9–5	Avenue Grounds	N/A	15–16	W4
32	July 8	Stars	1–6	Avenue Grounds	N/A	15–17	L1
–	July 10	Red Caps	Postponed (rain); Makeup: July 14				
33	July 11	Red Caps	2–11	Avenue Grounds	N/A	15–18	L2
34	July 12	Red Caps	4–3	Avenue Grounds	N/A	16–18	W1
35	July 14	Red Caps	4–8	Avenue Grounds	N/A	16–19	L1
36	July 15	Grays	9–0	Avenue Grounds	N/A	17–19	W1
37	July 16	Grays	3–5	Avenue Grounds	N/A	17–20	L1
38	July 17	Grays	8–4	Avenue Grounds	N/A	18–20	W1
39	July 19	Trojans	7–6	Avenue Grounds	N/A	19–20	W2
40	July 21	Trojans	10–0	Avenue Grounds	N/A	20–20	W3
–	July 24	@ White Stockings	Postponed (unknown reason); Makeup: July 25				
41	July 25	@ White Stockings	3–6	Lakefront Park	N/A	20–21	L1
42	July 26	@ White Stockings	11–8	Lakefront Park	N/A	21–21	W1
43	July 28	@ White Stockings	5–2	Lakefront Park	N/A	22–21	W2
44	July 30	Bisons	5–7	Avenue Grounds	N/A	22–22	L1
45	July 31	Bisons	3–5	Avenue Grounds	N/A	22–23	L2

August: 8–6 (Home: 7–3; Away: 1–3)

#	Date	Opponent	Score	Stadium	Attendance	Record	Streak
46	August 2	Bisons	5–9	Avenue Grounds	N/A	22–24	L3
–	August 5	Blues	Postponed (rain); Makeup: August 22				
–	August 6	Blues	Postponed (rain); Makeup: August 29 (site change)				
–	August 7	Blues	Postponed (rain); Makeup: September 30 (site change)				
47	August 9	White Stockings	11–6	Avenue Grounds	N/A	23–24	W1
48	August 11	White Stockings	5–1	Avenue Grounds	N/A	24–24	W2
49	August 12	White Stockings	5–0	Avenue Grounds	N/A	25–24	W3
–	August 14	@ Bisons	Postponed (unknown reason); Makeup: September 22				
50	August 15	@ Bisons	9–10	Riverside Park	N/A	25–25	L1
51	August 19	Blues	2–1	Avenue Grounds	N/A	26–25	W1
52	August 20	Blues	9–5	Avenue Grounds	N/A	27–25	W2
53	August 21	Blues	3–7	Avenue Grounds	N/A	27–26	L1
54	August 22	Blues	15–1	Avenue Grounds	N/A	28–26	W1
–	August 23	Bisons	Postponed (rain); Makeup: August 27				
55	August 26	Bisons	0–4	Avenue Grounds	N/A	28–27	L1
56	August 27	Bisons	5–2	Avenue Grounds	N/A	29–27	W1
57	August 28	@ Blues	6–7	Kennard Street Park	N/A	29–28	L1
58	August 29	@ Blues	9–3	Kennard Street Park	N/A	30–28	W1
59	August 30	@ Blues	3–10	Kennard Street Park	N/A	30–29	L1

September: 13–8 (Home: 0–0; Away: 13–8)

#	Date	Opponent	Score	Stadium	Attendance	Record	Streak
60	September 1	@ Blues	4–2	Kennard Street Park	N/A	31–29	W1
61	September 3	@ Stars	2–2	Newell Park	N/A	31–29	W1
62	September 4	@ Stars	6–2	Newell Park	N/A	32–29	W2
63	September 5	@ Stars	18–2	Newell Park	N/A	33–29	W3
64	September 6	@ Stars	6–0	Newell Park	N/A	34–29	W4
65	September 8	@ Trojans	11–5	Putnam Grounds	N/A	35–29	W5
–	September 9	@ Trojans	Postponed (rain); Makeup: September 11				
66	September 10	@ Trojans	4–9	Putnam Grounds	N/A	35–30	L1
67	September 11	@ Trojans	11–5	Putnam Grounds	N/A	36–30	W5
68	September 12	@ Red Caps	1–4	South End Grounds	N/A	36–31	L1
69	September 13	@ Red Caps	7–5	South End Grounds	N/A	37–31	W1
70	September 15	@ Red Caps	5–3	South End Grounds	N/A	38–31	W2
71	September 17	@ Grays	2–6	Messer Street Grounds	N/A	38–32	L1
72	September 18	@ Grays	4–5	Messer Street Grounds	N/A	38–33	L2
73	September 19	@ Grays	5–15	Messer Street Grounds	N/A	38–34	L3
74	September 22	@ Bisons	0–3	Riverside Park	N/A	38–35	L4
75	September 23	@ Bisons	7–12	Riverside Park	N/A	38–36	L5
76	September 24	@ Bisons	8–5	Riverside Park	N/A	39–36	W1
77	September 25	@ Bisons	10–2	Riverside Park	N/A	40–36	W2
78	September 26	@ Blues	6–2	Kennard Street Park	N/A	41–36	W3
79	September 27	@ Blues	15–4	Kennard Street Park	N/A	42–36	W4
80	September 29	@ Blues	13–1	Kennard Street Park	N/A	43–36	W5
81	September 30	@ Blues	6–9	Kennard Street Park	N/A	43–37	L1

=== Roster ===
1879 Cincinnati Reds
Roster
Pitchers: Will White; Catchers: Deacon White	Infielders: Ross Barnes; Mike Burke; Will Foley; Joe Gerhardt; King Kelly; Cal McVey	Outfielders: Buttercup Dickerson; Pete Hotaling; John Magner; Jack Neagle; Blondie Purcell; Harry Wheeler	Manager: Cal McVey; Deacon White

== Player stats ==
=== Batting ===
==== Starters by position ====
Note: Pos = Position; G = Games played; AB = At bats; H = Hits; Avg. = Batting average; HR = Home runs; RBI = Runs batted in

Pos	Player	G	AB	H	Avg.	HR	RBI
C	Deacon White	78	333	110	.330	1	52
1B	Cal McVey	81	354	105	.297	0	55
2B	Joe Gerhardt	79	313	62	.198	1	39
3B	King Kelly	77	345	120	.348	2	47
SS	Ross Barnes	77	323	86	.266	1	30
OF	Buttercup Dickerson	81	350	102	.291	2	57
OF	Pete Hotaling	81	369	103	.279	1	27
OF	Will Foley	56	218	46	.211	0	25

==== Other batters ====
Note: G = Games played; AB = At bats; H = Hits; Avg. = Batting average; HR = Home runs; RBI = Runs batted in

Player	G	AB	H	Avg.	HR	RBI
Mike Burke	28	117	26	.222	0	8
Blondie Purcell	12	50	11	.220	0	4
Jack Neagle	3	12	2	.167	0	2
John Magner	1	4	0	.000	0	1
Harry Wheeler	1	3	0	.000	0	0

=== Pitching ===
==== Starting pitchers ====
Note: G = Games pitched; IP = Innings pitched; W = Wins; L = Losses; ERA = Earned run average; SO = Strikeouts

Player	G	IP	W	L	ERA	SO
Will White	76	680.0	43	31	1.99	232
Blondie Purcell	2	18.0	0	2	4.00	3
Jack Neagle	2	13.0	0	1	3.46	4
Harry Wheeler	1	1.0	0	1	81.00	0

==== Other pitchers ====
Note: G = Games pitched; IP = Innings pitched; W = Wins; L = Losses; ERA = Earned run average; SO = Strikeouts

Player	G	IP	W	L	ERA	SO
Cal McVey	3	14.0	0	2	8.36	7
