= 1879 Chicago White Stockings season =

1879 Chicago White Stockings
- League: National League
- Ballpark: Lakefront Park
- City: Chicago
- Record: 46–33 (.582)
- League place: 4th
- Owner: William Hulbert
- Managers: Silver Flint, Cap Anson

The 1879 Chicago White Stockings season was the eighth season of the Chicago White Stockings franchise, the fourth in the National League and the second at Lakefront Park. The White Stockings finished fourth in the National League with a record of 46–33.

== Regular season ==
=== Season standings ===
National League
Team	W	L	Pct.	GB	Home	Road
Providence Grays	59	25	.702	—	34‍–‍8	25‍–‍17
Boston Red Caps	54	30	.643	5	29‍–‍13	25‍–‍17
Buffalo Bisons	46	32	.590	10	23‍–‍16	23‍–‍16
Chicago White Stockings	46	33	.582	10½	29‍–‍13	17‍–‍20
Cincinnati Reds	43	37	.537	14	21‍–‍16	22‍–‍21
Cleveland Blues	27	55	.329	31	15‍–‍27	12‍–‍28
Syracuse Stars	22	48	.314	30	11‍–‍22	11‍–‍26
Troy Trojans	19	56	.253	35½	12‍–‍27	7‍–‍29

=== Record vs. opponents ===
1879 National League record Sources:
Team	BSN	BUF	CHI	CIN	CLE	PRO	SYR	TRO
Boston	—	9–3	4–8	7–5	10–2	4–8	9–3	11–1
Buffalo	3–9	—	6–6–1	7–3	8–4	6–6	5–3	11–1
Chicago	8–4	6–6–1	—	3–8	8–4	5–7–1	8–1	8–3–2
Cincinnati	5–7	3–7	8–3	—	8–4	2–10	8–4–1	9–2
Cleveland	2–10	4–8	4–8	4–8	—	4–8	4–7	5–6
Providence	8–4	6–6	7–5–1	10–2	8–4	—	10–2	10–2
Syracuse	3–9	3–5	1–8	4–8–1	7–4	2–10	—	2–4
Troy	1–11	1–11	3–8–2	2–9	6–5	2–10	4–2	—

=== Roster ===
1879 Chicago White Stockings
Roster
Pitchers: Frank Hankinson; Terry Larkin; Catchers: Tom Dolan; Silver Flint	Infielders: Cap Anson; Lew Brown; Herm Doscher; John Peters; Joe Quest; John Stedronsky; Ned Williamson	Outfielders: Abner Dalrymple; George Gore; Bill Harbridge; Jack Remsen; Orator Shafer	Manager: Cap Anson; Silver Flint

== Player stats ==
=== Batting ===
==== Starters by position ====
Note: Pos = Position; G = Games played; AB = At bats; H = Hits; Avg. = Batting average; HR = Home runs; RBI = Runs batted in

Pos	Player	G	AB	H	Avg.	HR	RBI
C	Silver Flint	79	324	92	.284	1	41
1B	Cap Anson	51	227	72	.317	0	34
2B	Joe Quest	83	334	69	.207	0	22
3B	Ned Williamson	80	320	94	.294	1	36
SS	John Peters	83	379	93	.245	1	31
OF	Orator Shafer	73	316	96	.304	0	35
OF	Abner Dalrymple	71	333	97	.291	0	23
OF	George Gore	63	266	70	.263	0	32

==== Other batters ====
Note: G = Games played; AB = At bats; H = Hits; Avg. = Batting average; HR = Home runs; RBI = Runs batted in

Player	G	AB	H	Avg.	HR	RBI
Jack Remsen	42	152	33	.217	0	8
Lew Brown	6	21	6	.286	0	3
Bill Harbridge	4	18	2	.111	0	1
John Stedronsky	4	12	1	.083	0	0
Herm Doscher	3	11	2	.182	0	1
Tom Dolan	1	4	0	.000	0	0

=== Pitching ===
==== Starting pitchers ====
Note: G = Games pitched; IP = Innings pitched; W = Wins; L = Losses; ERA = Earned run average; SO = Strikeouts

Player	G	IP	W	L	ERA	SO
Terry Larkin	58	513.1	31	23	2.44	142
Frank Hankinson	26	230.2	15	10	2.50	69
