= 1879 Cleveland Blues season =

1879 Cleveland Blues
- League: National League
- Ballpark: Kennard Street Park
- City: Cleveland, Ohio
- Record: 27–55 (.329)
- League place: 6th
- Manager: Jim McCormick

The 1879 season was the National League debut for the Cleveland Blues. They finished the season 27–55, sixth in the eight-team National League.

== Regular season ==
=== Season standings ===
National League
Team	W	L	Pct.	GB	Home	Road
Providence Grays	59	25	.702	—	34‍–‍8	25‍–‍17
Boston Red Caps	54	30	.643	5	29‍–‍13	25‍–‍17
Buffalo Bisons	46	32	.590	10	23‍–‍16	23‍–‍16
Chicago White Stockings	46	33	.582	10½	29‍–‍13	17‍–‍20
Cincinnati Reds	43	37	.537	14	21‍–‍16	22‍–‍21
Cleveland Blues	27	55	.329	31	15‍–‍27	12‍–‍28
Syracuse Stars	22	48	.314	30	11‍–‍22	11‍–‍26
Troy Trojans	19	56	.253	35½	12‍–‍27	7‍–‍29

=== Record vs. opponents ===
1879 National League record Sources:
Team	BSN	BUF	CHI	CIN	CLE	PRO	SYR	TRO
Boston	—	9–3	4–8	7–5	10–2	4–8	9–3	11–1
Buffalo	3–9	—	6–6–1	7–3	8–4	6–6	5–3	11–1
Chicago	8–4	6–6–1	—	3–8	8–4	5–7–1	8–1	8–3–2
Cincinnati	5–7	3–7	8–3	—	8–4	2–10	8–4–1	9–2
Cleveland	2–10	4–8	4–8	4–8	—	4–8	4–7	5–6
Providence	8–4	6–6	7–5–1	10–2	8–4	—	10–2	10–2
Syracuse	3–9	3–5	1–8	4–8–1	7–4	2–10	—	2–4
Troy	1–11	1–11	3–8–2	2–9	6–5	2–10	4–2	—

=== Roster ===
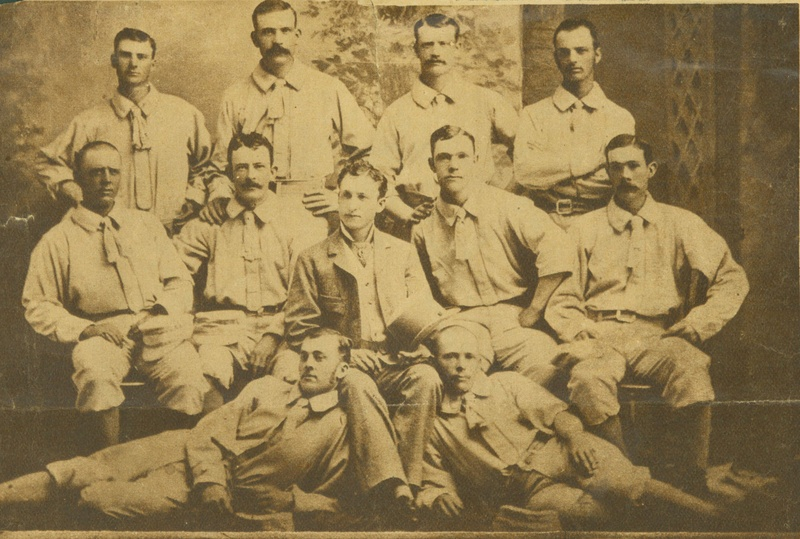
1879 Cleveland Blues team photograph

1879 Cleveland Blues
Roster
Pitchers: Jim McCormick; Bobby Mitchell	Catchers: Barney Gilligan; Sonny Hoffman; John Kelly; Doc Kennedy; Infielders: Jack Allen; Tom Carey; Jack Glasscock; Bill Phillips; Fred Warner	Outfielders: Charlie Eden; Fred Gunkle; Billy Riley; Len Stockwell; George Strief	Manager: Jim McCormick

== Player stats ==
=== Batting ===
==== Starters by position ====
Note: Pos = Position; G = Games played; AB = At bats; H = Hits; Avg. = Batting average; HR = Home runs; RBI = Runs batted in

Pos	Player	G	AB	H	Avg.	HR	RBI
C	Doc Kennedy	49	193	56	.290	1	18
1B	Bill Phillips	81	365	99	.271	0	29
2B	Jack Glasscock	80	325	68	.209	0	29
3B	Fred Warner	76	316	77	.244	0	22
SS	Tom Carey	80	335	80	.239	0	32
OF	Charlie Eden	81	353	96	.272	3	34
OF	George Strief	71	264	46	.174	0	15
OF	Billy Riley	43	161	23	.143	0	9

==== Other batters ====
Note: G = Games played; AB = At bats; H = Hits; Avg. = Batting average; HR = Home runs; RBI = Runs batted in

Player	G	AB	H	Avg.	HR	RBI
Barney Gilligan	52	205	35	.171	0	11
Jack Allen	16	60	7	.117	0	4
Sonny Hoffman	2	6	0	.000	0	0
Len Stockwell	2	6	0	.000	0	0
John Kelly	1	4	1	.250	0	0
Fred Gunkle	1	3	0	.000	0	0

=== Pitching ===
==== Starting pitchers ====
Note: G = Games pitched; IP = Innings pitched; W = Wins; L = Losses; ERA = Earned run average; SO = Strikeouts

Player	G	IP	W	L	ERA	SO
Jim McCormick	62	546.1	20	40	2.42	197
Bobby Mitchell	23	194.2	7	15	3.28	90
