= Steve Libby =

American baseball player and umpire (1853–1935)

- First baseman
- Born: December 8, 1853; Scarborough, Maine, U.S.
- Died: March 31, 1935 (aged 81); Milford, Connecticut, U.S.
- Batted: Unknown Threw: Unknown

MLB debut
- May 10, 1879, for the Buffalo Bisons

Last MLB appearance
- May 10, 1879, for the Buffalo Bisons

MLB statistics
- Batting average: .000
- Hits: 0
- Runs: 0
- Stats at Baseball Reference

Teams
- Buffalo Bisons (1879)

Stephen Augustus Libby (December 8, 1853 – March 31, 1935) was an American baseball player for the Buffalo Bisons of the National League for one game during the 1879 season. He also served as an umpire in the National League for one game in 1879 and eight more in 1880.

== Playing career ==
Libby began his playing career in Portland, Maine in 1870. In 1875, he was a member of a club in Chelsea, Massachusetts. He played for Fall River of the New England League in 1876 in 1877. In 1878, he was the first baseman for the Buffalo Bisons of the International Association for Professional Base Ball Players. That year, the Bisons, which also included Pud Galvin, Tom Dolan, Bill Crowley, Bill McGunnigle, Denny Mack, Joe Hornung, Trick McSorley, and Davy Force, won the International Association championship and defeated National League clubs in ten of seventeen games. Libby was one of five Bison players named to the New York Clipper all-star team, which made its selections based on fielding percentage. In 1879, Buffalo was accepted into the National League. Libby appeared in one game for Buffalo that season (May 10, 1879), going hitless in two at-bats.

== Career as an umpire ==
Libby umpired the September 6, 1879 game between Buffalo and Boston. He was named to the National League umpiring staff for the 1880 season at the February league meeting. On May 22, 1880, he was called upon to umpire a game between Boston and the Providence Grays after Charles F. Daniels' perceived bias against Boston in the prior game led to both teams agreeing to replace him. He umpired seven more National League games that season – a three game series between Chicago in Buffalo in Buffalo (May 25–27), the June 19 game between Chicago and Worcester in Worcester, and a three-game series between Providence and Chicago in Chicago (July 5-6, & 8). He also umpired some college games that year.

== Post-baseball ==
By 1880, Libby was working as a telegraph operator. He worked for the Housatonic Railroad as an operator and clerk and was superintendent of the Housatonic Manufacturing Company in Wallingford, Connecticut. He later worked for the Consolidated Railway and became chief clerk to the railroad's superintendent of telegraph in 1903.
