= 1879 Major League Baseball season =

1879 MLB season
- League: National League (NL)
- Sport: Baseball
- Duration: May 1 – September 30, 1879
- Games: 84
- Teams: 8

Pennant winner
- NL champions: Providence Grays
- NL runners-up: Boston Red Caps

MLB seasons
- ← 1878 1880 →

Locations of teams for the 1879 National League season
National League

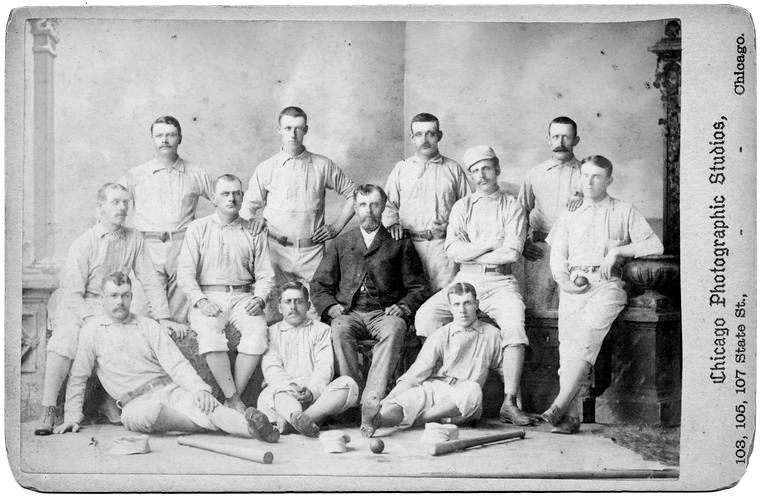
A team photo of the Providence Grays

The 1879 major league baseball season was contested from May 1 through September 30, 1879, and saw the Providence Grays as the pennant winner of the fourth season of the National League. There was no postseason.

Over the off-season, the National League was set on expanding from a six-team league to an eight-team league. The Indianapolis Blues and Milwaukee Grays folded, and in its place, the league admitted the Cleveland Blues, the International Association's Buffalo Bisons and Syracuse Stars, and finally (with confirmation Milwaukee was not returning) the Troy Trojans.

It is suggested by Society for American Baseball Research (SABR) that this season featured the first African-American to play major league baseball, William Edward White, who played one game with the Providence Grays on June 21. He predates brothers Moses Fleetwood Walker and Weldy Walker by five years, and Jackie Robinson by 68 years.

== Schedule ==
The 1879 schedule consisted of 84 games for all eight teams of the National League. Each team was scheduled to play 12 games against the other seven teams in the league. This format was an adjustment to the 12-games-each format that had been in place since 1877, as the National League expanded from six to eight teams, adding 24 games to each team's schedule.

Opening Day took place on May 1 featuring all eight teams. The final day of the season was on September 30, featuring six teams.

== Rule changes ==
The 1879 season saw the following rule changes:

- The number of balls called that would award a base on balls remained nine, but the rule was reworded, so that there simply needed to be nine balls to walk a batter. Previously, three balls were required, but one ball was the same as three "unfair pitches".
- Any pitcher who hit a batter, "unless it was clearly an accident", would be fined between $10 and $50 (between $346 and $1,728 in 2025), in an effort to reduce intentional hit by pitches.
- The first batter of any inning of a game will be the batter who followed the last batter of the previous inning. Previously, if a runner was putout on a base, the batter after the runner called out would lead off the next inning.
- The pitcher's box was changed from a six feet square to an area four feet wide and six feet long, by moving the back line forwards two feet
- The Player reserve clause was for the first time put into a contract.
- The pitcher had to face a batsman before pitching to him.

== Teams ==
League	Team	City	Ballpark	Capacity	Manager
National League	Boston Red Caps	Boston, Massachusetts	South End Grounds	3,000	Harry Wright
National League	Buffalo Bisons	Buffalo, New York	Riverside Park	Unknown	John Clapp
National League	Chicago White Stockings	Chicago, Illinois	Lakefront Park	5,000	Cap Anson
National League	Chicago White Stockings	Chicago, Illinois	Lakefront Park	5,000	Silver Flint
National League	Cincinnati Reds	Cincinnati, Ohio	Avenue Grounds	Unknown	Deacon White
National League	Cincinnati Reds	Cincinnati, Ohio	Avenue Grounds	Unknown	Cal McVey
National League	Cleveland Blues	Cleveland, Ohio	National League Park	Unknown	Jim McCormick
National League	Providence Grays	Providence, Rhode Island	Messer Street Grounds	6,000	George Wright
National League	Syracuse Stars	Syracuse, New York	Newell Park	Unknown	Mike Dorgan
National League	Syracuse Stars	Syracuse, New York	Newell Park	Unknown	Bill Holbert
National League	Syracuse Stars	Syracuse, New York	Newell Park	Unknown	Jimmy Macullar
National League	Troy Trojans	Troy, New York	Putnam Grounds	Unknown	Horace Phillips
National League	Troy Trojans	Troy, New York	Putnam Grounds	Unknown	Bob Ferguson

== Standings ==
=== National League ===
National League
Team	W	L	Pct.	GB	Home	Road
Providence Grays	59	25	.702	—	34‍–‍8	25‍–‍17
Boston Red Caps	54	30	.643	5	29‍–‍13	25‍–‍17
Buffalo Bisons	46	32	.590	10	23‍–‍16	23‍–‍16
Chicago White Stockings	46	33	.582	10½	29‍–‍13	17‍–‍20
Cincinnati Reds	43	37	.537	14	21‍–‍16	22‍–‍21
Cleveland Blues	27	55	.329	31	15‍–‍27	12‍–‍28
Syracuse Stars	22	48	.314	30	11‍–‍22	11‍–‍26
Troy Trojans	19	56	.253	35½	12‍–‍27	7‍–‍29

=== Tie games ===
Five tie games, which are not factored into winning percentage or games behind occurred throughout the season (though standings were determined by total wins, not winning percentage).

The Chicago White Stockings had four tie games. The Troy Trojans had two tie games. The Buffalo Bisons, Cincinnati Reds, Providence Grays, and Syracuse Stars had one tie game each.

- June 10, Chicago White Stockings vs. Troy Trojans, tied at 1.
- July 21, Providence Grays vs. Chicago White Stockings, scoreless.
- August 30, Chicago White Stockings vs. Buffalo Bisons, tied at 5.
- September 3, Cincinnati Reds vs. Syracuse Stars, tied at 2.
- September 19, Chicago White Stockings vs. Troy Trojans, tied at 6.

== Managerial changes ==
=== Off-season ===
Team	Former Manager	New Manager
Chicago White Stockings	Bob Ferguson	Cap Anson
Cincinnati Reds	Cal McVey	Deacon White
Indianapolis Blues	John Clapp	Team folded
Milwaukee Grays	Jack Chapman	Team folded
Providence Grays	Tom York	George Wright

=== In-season ===
Team	Former Manager	New Manager
Chicago White Stockings	Cap Anson	Silver Flint
Cincinnati Reds	Deacon White	Cal McVey
Syracuse Stars	Mike Dorgan	Bill Holbert
Syracuse Stars	Bill Holbert	Jimmy Macullar
Troy Trojans	Horace Phillips	Bob Ferguson

== League leaders ==
=== National League ===
Hitting leaders
Stat	Player	Total
AVG	Paul Hines (PRO)	.357
OPS	Jim O'Rourke (BSN)	.877
HR	Charley Jones (BSN)	9
RBI	Charley Jones (BSN); Jim O'Rourke (BSN)	62
R	Charley Jones (BSN)	85
H	Paul Hines (PRO)	146

Pitching leaders
Stat	Player	Total
W	John Ward (PRO)	47
L	George Bradley (TRO); Jim McCormick (CLE)	40
ERA	Tommy Bond (BSN)	1.96
K	John Ward (PRO)	239
IP	Will White^{1} (CIN)	680.0
SV	Bobby Mathews (PRO); John Ward (PRO)	1
WHIP	Tommy Bond (BSN)	1.021

^{1} All-time single-season innings pitched record

== Venues ==
Four teams joined the National League, playing at four venues:

- The Buffalo Bisons played at Riverside Park.
- The Cleveland Blues played at National League Park.
- The Syracuse Stars played at Newell Park.
- The Troy Trojans played at the Putnam Grounds.

The Troy Trojans would play their final game at the Putnam Grounds on September 20 against the Chicago White Stockings, moving to Haymakers' Grounds for the start of the 1880 season.

== See also ==
- 1879 in baseball (Events, Births, Deaths)
