= 1879 Buffalo Bisons season =

1879 Buffalo Bisons
- League: National League
- Ballpark: Riverside Park
- City: Buffalo, New York
- Record: 46–32 (.590)
- League place: 3rd
- Manager: John Clapp

The 1879 season was the debut year in the National League for the Buffalo Bisons, who had previously played an independent schedule. The Bisons wound up with a record of 46–32 and finished in third place.

== Regular season ==
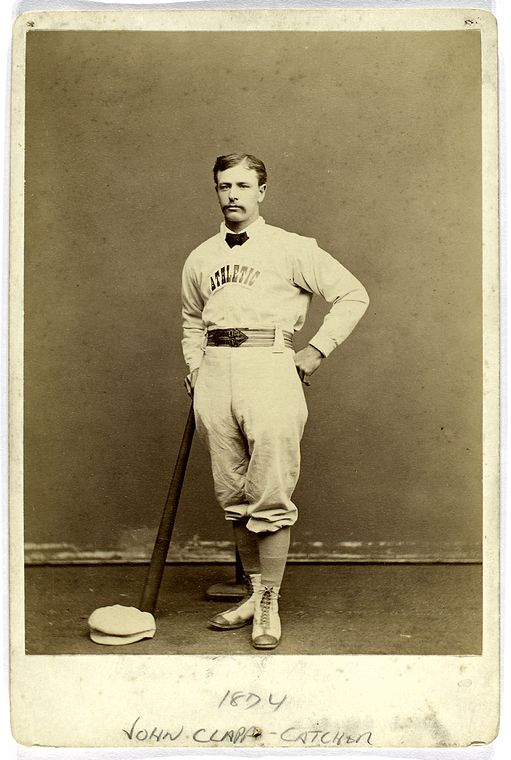
Catcher John Clapp

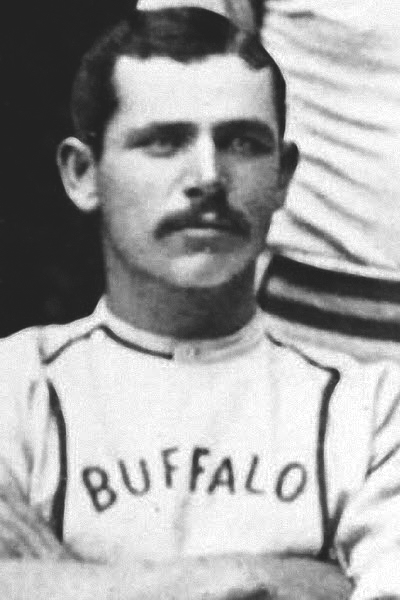
Right fielder Bill Crowley

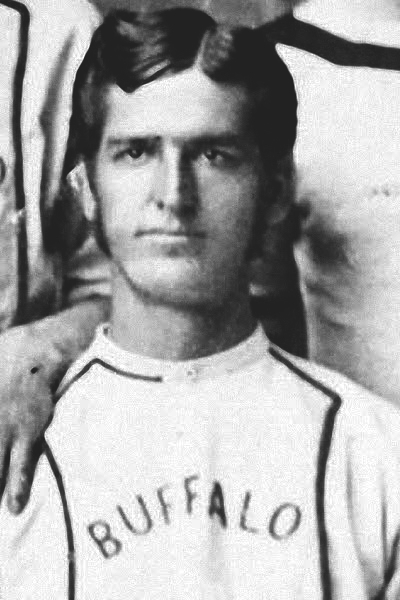
Second baseman Chick Fulmer

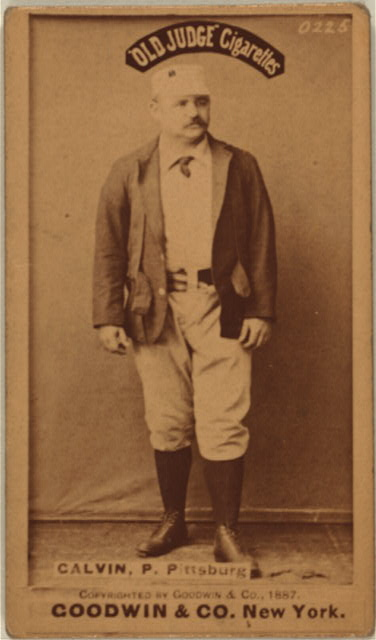
Pitcher Pud Galvin

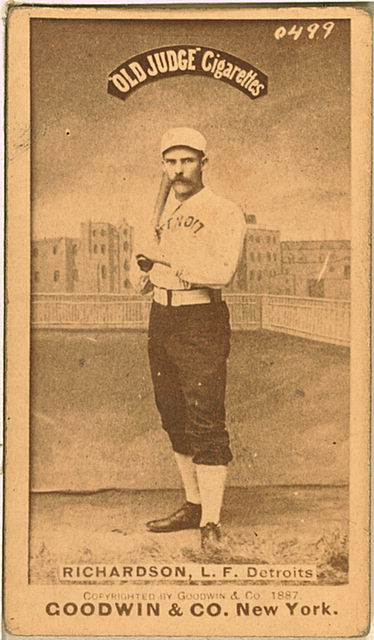
Third baseman Hardy Richardson

=== Season standings ===
National League
Team	W	L	Pct.	GB	Home	Road
Providence Grays	59	25	.702	—	34‍–‍8	25‍–‍17
Boston Red Caps	54	30	.643	5	29‍–‍13	25‍–‍17
Buffalo Bisons	46	32	.590	10	23‍–‍16	23‍–‍16
Chicago White Stockings	46	33	.582	10½	29‍–‍13	17‍–‍20
Cincinnati Reds	43	37	.537	14	21‍–‍16	22‍–‍21
Cleveland Blues	27	55	.329	31	15‍–‍27	12‍–‍28
Syracuse Stars	22	48	.314	30	11‍–‍22	11‍–‍26
Troy Trojans	19	56	.253	35½	12‍–‍27	7‍–‍29

=== Record vs. opponents ===
1879 National League record Sources:
Team	BSN	BUF	CHI	CIN	CLE	PRO	SYR	TRO
Boston	—	9–3	4–8	7–5	10–2	4–8	9–3	11–1
Buffalo	3–9	—	6–6–1	7–3	8–4	6–6	5–3	11–1
Chicago	8–4	6–6–1	—	3–8	8–4	5–7–1	8–1	8–3–2
Cincinnati	5–7	3–7	8–3	—	8–4	2–10	8–4–1	9–2
Cleveland	2–10	4–8	4–8	4–8	—	4–8	4–7	5–6
Providence	8–4	6–6	7–5–1	10–2	8–4	—	10–2	10–2
Syracuse	3–9	3–5	1–8	4–8–1	7–4	2–10	—	2–4
Troy	1–11	1–11	3–8–2	2–9	6–5	2–10	4–2	—

=== Roster ===
1879 Buffalo Bisons
Roster
Pitchers: Pud Galvin; Catchers: John Clapp	Infielders: Davy Force; Chick Fulmer; Steve Libby; Hardy Richardson; Jack Rowe; Oscar Walker	Outfielders: Bill Crowley; Dave Eggler; Joe Hornung; Bill McGunnigle	Manager: John Clapp

== Player stats ==
=== Batting ===
==== Starters by position ====
Note: Pos = Position; G = Games played; AB = At bats; H = Hits; Avg. = Batting average; HR = Home runs; RBI = Runs batted in

Pos	Player	G	AB	H	Avg.	HR	RBI
C	John Clapp	70	292	77	.264	1	36
1B	Oscar Walker	72	287	79	.275	1	35
2B	Chick Fulmer	76	306	82	.268	0	28
3B	Hardy Richardson	79	336	95	.283	0	37
SS	Davy Force	79	316	66	.209	0	8
OF	Dave Eggler	78	317	66	.208	0	27
OF	Joe Hornung	78	319	85	.266	0	38
OF	Bill Crowley	60	261	75	.287	0	30

==== Other batters ====
Note: G = Games played; AB = At bats; H = Hits; Avg. = Batting average; HR = Home runs; RBI = Runs batted in

Player	G	AB	H	Avg.	HR	RBI
Bill McGunnigle	47	171	30	.175	0	5
Jack Rowe	8	34	12	.353	0	8
Steve Libby	1	2	0	.000	0	0

=== Pitching ===
==== Starting pitchers ====
Note: G = Games pitched; IP = Innings pitched; W = Wins; L = Losses; ERA = Earned run average; SO = Strikeouts

Player	G	IP	W	L	ERA	SO
Pud Galvin	66	593.0	37	27	2.28	136
Bill McGunnigle	14	120.0	9	5	2.63	62
