= George Adams (baseball) =

American baseball player (1855–1920)

- First baseman/Outfielder
- Born: January 26, 1855; Worcester, Massachusetts, U.S.
- Died: October 11, 1920 (aged 65)
- Batted: Right Threw: Right

MLB debut
- June 14, 1879, for the Syracuse Stars

Last MLB appearance
- 1879, for the Syracuse Stars

MLB statistics
- At bats: 13
- RBI: 0
- Home runs: 0
- Batting average: .231
- Stats at Baseball Reference

Teams
- Syracuse Stars (1879)

George Adams (January 26, 1855 – October 11, 1920) was an American professional baseball player who played for the 1879 Syracuse Stars.
