= 1879 Providence Grays season =

1879 Providence Grays
- 1879 National League champions
- League: National League
- Ballpark: Messer Street Grounds
- City: Providence, Rhode Island
- Record: 59–25 (.702)
- League place: 1st
- Owner: Henry Root
- Manager: George Wright

The 1879 Providence Grays won the National League title in only their second season in the league.

== Regular season ==
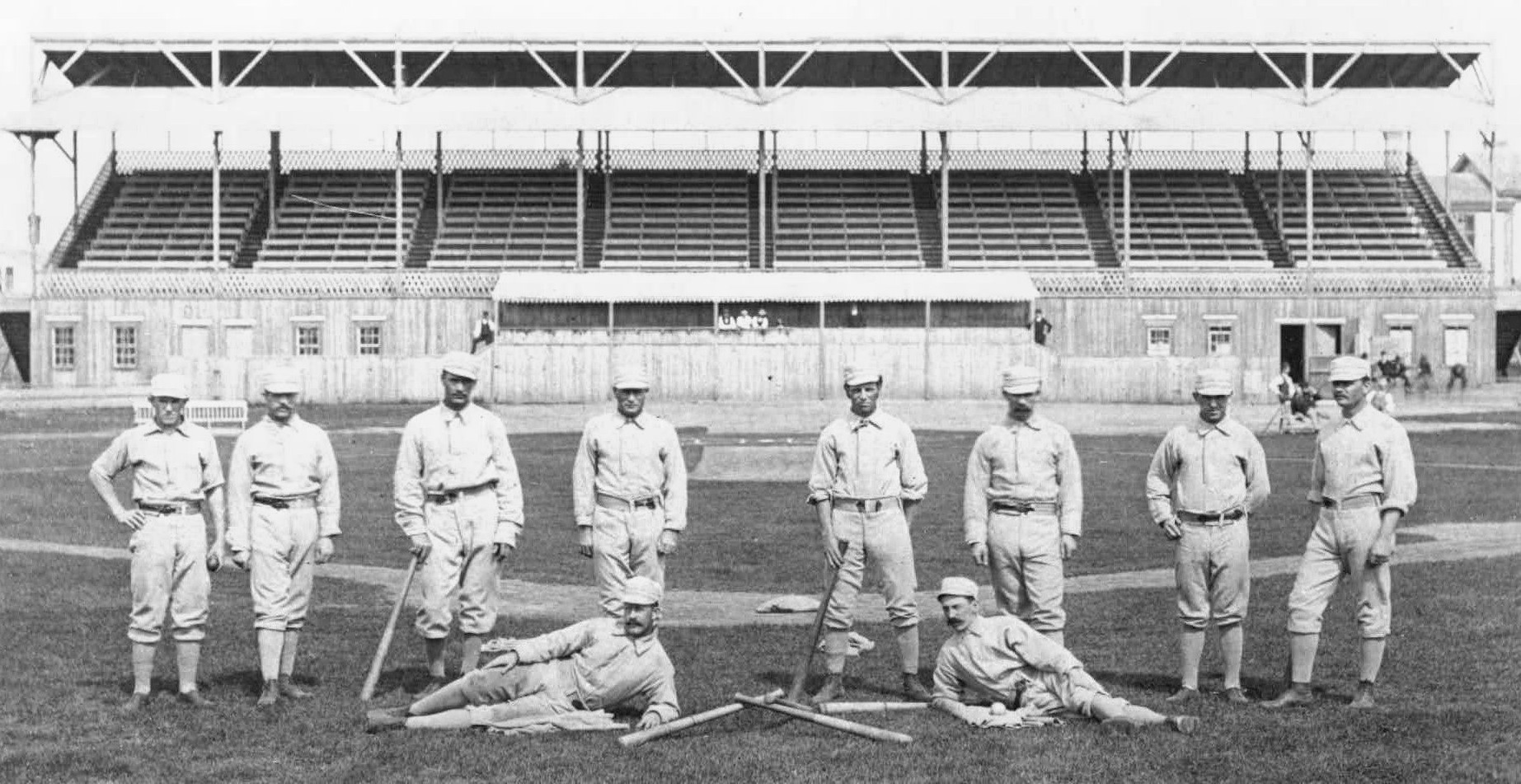
1879 Providence Grays

=== Season standings ===
National League
Team	W	L	Pct.	GB	Home	Road
Providence Grays	59	25	.702	—	34‍–‍8	25‍–‍17
Boston Red Caps	54	30	.643	5	29‍–‍13	25‍–‍17
Buffalo Bisons	46	32	.590	10	23‍–‍16	23‍–‍16
Chicago White Stockings	46	33	.582	10½	29‍–‍13	17‍–‍20
Cincinnati Reds	43	37	.537	14	21‍–‍16	22‍–‍21
Cleveland Blues	27	55	.329	31	15‍–‍27	12‍–‍28
Syracuse Stars	22	48	.314	30	11‍–‍22	11‍–‍26
Troy Trojans	19	56	.253	35½	12‍–‍27	7‍–‍29

=== Record vs. opponents ===
1879 National League record Sources:
Team	BSN	BUF	CHI	CIN	CLE	PRO	SYR	TRO
Boston	—	9–3	4–8	7–5	10–2	4–8	9–3	11–1
Buffalo	3–9	—	6–6–1	7–3	8–4	6–6	5–3	11–1
Chicago	8–4	6–6–1	—	3–8	8–4	5–7–1	8–1	8–3–2
Cincinnati	5–7	3–7	8–3	—	8–4	2–10	8–4–1	9–2
Cleveland	2–10	4–8	4–8	4–8	—	4–8	4–7	5–6
Providence	8–4	6–6	7–5–1	10–2	8–4	—	10–2	10–2
Syracuse	3–9	3–5	1–8	4–8–1	7–4	2–10	—	2–4
Troy	1–11	1–11	3–8–2	2–9	6–5	2–10	4–2	—

=== Roster ===
1879 Providence Grays
Roster
Pitchers: Bobby Mathews; John Ward; Catchers: Doug Allison; Lew Brown; Emil Gross; Rudy Kemmler	Infielders: Jack Farrell; Bill Hague; Mike McGeary; Joe Start; Denny Sullivan; Bill White; George Wright	Outfielders: Paul Hines; Dan O'Leary; Jim O'Rourke; Tom York	Manager: George Wright

== Player stats ==
=== Batting ===
==== Starters by position ====
Note: Pos = Position; G = Games played; AB = At bats; H = Hits; Avg. = Batting average; HR = Home runs; RBI = Runs batted in

Pos	Player	G	AB	H	Avg.	HR	RBI
C	Lew Brown	53	229	59	.258	2	38
1B	Joe Start	66	317	101	.319	2	37
2B	Mike McGeary	85	374	103	.275	0	35
3B	Bill Hague	51	209	47	.225	0	21
SS	George Wright	85	388	107	.276	1	42
OF	Paul Hines	85	409	146	.357	2	52
OF	Tom York	81	342	106	.310	1	50
OF	Jim O'Rourke	81	362	126	.348	1	46

==== Other batters ====
Note: G = Games played; AB = At bats; H = Hits; Avg. = Batting average; HR = Home runs; RBI = Runs batted in

Player	G	AB	H	Avg.	HR	RBI
Emil Gross	30	132	46	.348	0	24
Jack Farrell	12	51	13	.255	0	5
Denny Sullivan	5	19	5	.263	0	2
Rudy Kemmler	2	7	1	.143	0	0
Dan O'Leary	2	7	3	.429	0	2
Doug Allison	1	5	0	.000	0	0
Bill White	1	4	1	.250	0	0

=== Pitching ===
==== Starting pitchers ====
Note: G = Games pitched; IP = Innings pitched; W = Wins; L = Losses; ERA = Earned run average; SO = Strikeouts

Player	G	IP	W	L	ERA	SO
John Ward	70	587.0	47	19	2.15	239
Bobby Mathews	27	189.0	12	6	2.29	90
