= Barney Gilligan =

American baseball player (1856–1934)

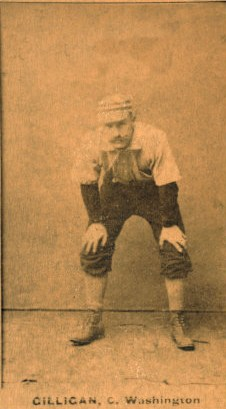
- Catcher
- Born: January 3, 1856; Cambridge, Massachusetts, U.S.
- Died: April 1, 1934 (aged 78); Lynn, Massachusetts, U.S.
- Batted: Right Threw: Right

MLB debut
- June 12, 1879, for the Cleveland Blues

Last MLB appearance
- April 27, 1888, for the Detroit Wolverines

MLB statistics
- Batting average: .207
- Runs: 217
- Runs batted in: 167
- Stats at Baseball Reference

Teams
- Cleveland Blues (1879–1880); Providence Grays (1881–1885); Washington Nationals (1886–1887); Detroit Wolverines (1888)

Andrew Bernard "Barney" Gilligan (January 3, 1856 – April 1, 1934) was an American professional baseball player whose career spanned 12 seasons, 11 of which were spent with the Major League Baseball (MLB) Cleveland Blues (1879–1880), Providence Grays (1881–1885), Washington Nationals (1886–1887), and Detroit Wolverines (1888). Gilligan, who predominately played as a catcher, also played as an outfielder and a shortstop. Over his career, Gilligan compiled a career batting average of .207 with 217 runs scored, 388 hits, 68 doubles, 23 triples, three home runs, and 167 runs batted in (RBI) in 523 games played. Although the majority of his career was spent in the major leagues, Gilligan also played in minor league baseball. He was listed as standing 5 feet 6 inches (168 cm) and weighing 130 pounds (59 kg).

== Early life ==
Andrew Bernard Gilligan was born in Cambridge, Massachusetts, on January 3, 1856. He was the sixth child of seven born to Patrick Gilligan, a laborer, and Sarah Gilligan. Both Patrick and Sarah had immigrated to the United States from Northern Ireland.

== Professional career ==
Gilligan began his professional career playing right field in 1874 for the New York Flyaways, an amateur baseball club. He continued his professional baseball career in 1876 and 1877. In 1878, Gilligan played for various minor-league clubs such as the Somerville Unions of Somerville, Massachusetts, and the Charlestown Alerts of Charlestown, Massachusetts.

In his first full MLB season, Gilligan played for the Cleveland Blues. After his first game with the Blues, the Cleveland Leader stated "Gilligan caught exceedingly well taking some fine pickups." Over 52 games played, Gilligan batted a career-low .171 with 11 RBI and six doubles. Defensively, he played 27 games as catcher and 23 as an outfielder. Next season, Gilligan continued to play for the Blues, serving as backup catcher to Doc Kennedy before leaving the team at the end of the season to sign with the Providence Grays. With the Grays, he served again as a backup catcher before the starter (Emil Gross) became injured; on the season, Gilligan batted .219 with 20 RBI. Next year, in 1882, Gilligan became the starting catcher for the Grays; his backup, Sandy Nava, was the first Mexican-American baseball player. When the season was over, the Grays finished 52–32, second in the National League (NL), under manager Harry Wright.

By 1883, Gilligan had become the Grays starting catcher. Despite breaking his finger and missing two weeks in May, Gilligan led the National League in assists as a catcher, while his team finished third in the NL. He continued his tenure with the Grays the following season. Gilligan played in a career-high 82 games, while also recording career highs in RBI (38), strikeouts (41), and on-base percentage (.325) and leading MLB in defensive games as a catcher (81). After finishing at the top of the NL, the Grays played in the 1884 World Series against the New York Metropolitans of the American Association. Gilligan went 4–for–9 over the three-game series, with the Grays defeating the Metropolitans three games to none.

After spending the 1885 season with the Grays, and tying Andy Cusick for the MLB lead in errors committed as a catcher, the Grays management sold out in November of that year. The NL bought the Grays for $6,000, while Gilligan was assigned to the Washington Nationals. He served as captain of the team for the 1886 season, catching 71 games and batting .190. Before the 1887 season, he established a restaurant in the District of Columbia.

"[Cliff] Carroll was released by Washington last week. He and Barney Gilligan are both out in the cold; yet, both are good ballplayers. Fooling with [whiskey] has cost them dearly."

— An 1887 issue of the Oshkosh Daily Northwestern

In 1887, Gilligan was fined $25 for binge drinking and missing a game for the Nationals. The next season, Gilligan was released by the team. In his final MLB season, Gilligan signed with the Detroit Wolverines. He played in one game for the team, going 1–for–5 with a run and a strikeout. Later that year, Gilligan signed with the Lynn Shoemakers, appearing in 11 games before joining the Manchester Maroons for three games. For the next three years, Gilligan continued to play minor league baseball. In 1889, he played for the Hyannis town team in what is now the Cape Cod Baseball League.

His career MLB batting average (.207) is tied with John Henry for the seventh lowest all-time among batters with at least 1,000 at bats.

== After baseball ==
After retiring from baseball, Gilligan lived in Lynn, Massachusetts, with his wife, Sara. He worked as a garbage collector before dying of erysipelas on April 1, 1934. Gilligan was interred at Pine Grove Cemetery in Lynn.
