= Emil Gross =

American baseball player (1858–1921)

- Catcher
- Born: March 4, 1858; Chicago, Illinois, US
- Died: August 24, 1921 (aged 63); Eagle River, Wisconsin, US
- Batted: Right Threw: Right

MLB debut
- August 13, 1879, for the Providence Grays

Last MLB appearance
- July 14, 1884, for the Chicago Browns/Pittsburgh Stogies

MLB statistics
- Batting average: .295
- Home runs: 7
- Runs scored: 141
- Stats at Baseball Reference

Teams
- Providence Grays (1879–81); Philadelphia Quakers (1883); Chicago Browns/Pittsburgh Stogies (1884)

Emil Michael Gross (March 4, 1858 – August 21, 1921) was an American professional baseball player whose career spanned from 1877 to 1884. He played five years in Major League Baseball as a catcher for the Providence Grays (1879–1881), Philadelphia Quakers (1883), and Chicago Browns/Pittsburgh Stogies (1884).

In 1880, Gross established a new major league record by appearing in 87 games as catcher. During his major league career, he appeared in 248 games and compiled a .295 batting average with 67 doubles, 21 triples, seven home runs, and 107 runs batted in.

== Early years ==
Gross was born in Chicago, Illinois, in 1858. Gross began his professional baseball career playing for the St. Paul Red Caps of the League Alliance in 1877.

== Major League Baseball ==
=== Providence ===
In August 1879, Gross made his major league debut with the 1879 Providence Grays, compiled a .348 batting average, and appeared in 30 games as catcher in the last part of the season. The 1879 Providence team won the National League pennant with a 59-25 record and featured Hall of Fame shortstop-manager George Wright and Hall of Fame pitcher Monte Ward who won 49 games in 1879. Gross replaced the Gray's number one catcher, Lew Brown, late in the season.

In 1880, Gross became the Gray's number one catcher and led the National League's catchers in games played (87), putouts (429), assists (126), errors (86), and passed balls (73). His 87 games as catcher in 1880 established a major league record that stood until 1886 when Doc Bushong appeared in 106 games as catcher. Gross also had a 3.0 wins above replacement rating for the 1880 season, one of the highest for to a catcher in the 1870s or 1880s.

At the time of the 1880 U.S. Census, in June 1880, Gray registered as a boarder at 150 Broad Street in Providence, the same address registered for teammates Mike McGeary, George Bradley, Jack Farrell, Joe Start, Paul Hines, and John Peters.

Gross returned to Providence in 1881 and was the team's catcher in 50 games. He compiled a .307 batting average and a 1.1 wins above replacement rating. His 37 errors as catcher ranked as the third highest in the National League.

At the end of the 1881 season, Gross was placed on the National League's blacklist upon charges of "general dissipation and insubordination."

=== Philadelphia and after ===
In 1883, after one year out of baseball, Gross was reinstated from the blacklist and joined the Philadelphia Quakers. He appeared in 55 games as catcher for Philadelphia and compiled a .307 batting average and .489 slugging percentage. However, he led the National League with 74 errors in his 55 games as catcher and also gave up 67 passed balls.

Gross concluded his major league career in 1884 playing for the Chicago Browns/Pittsburgh Stogies of the Union Association. Gross hit .358 with a .589 slugging percentage in 23 games in the Union Association. He also played during the 1884 season for Springfield in the Ohio State League and Oil City in the Iron & Oil Association.

When Gross's name was offered as a possible outfielder in 1885, a St. Louis correspondent wrote: "Great Scot! He couldn't judge a flour barrel twenty feet in the air."

== Later years ==
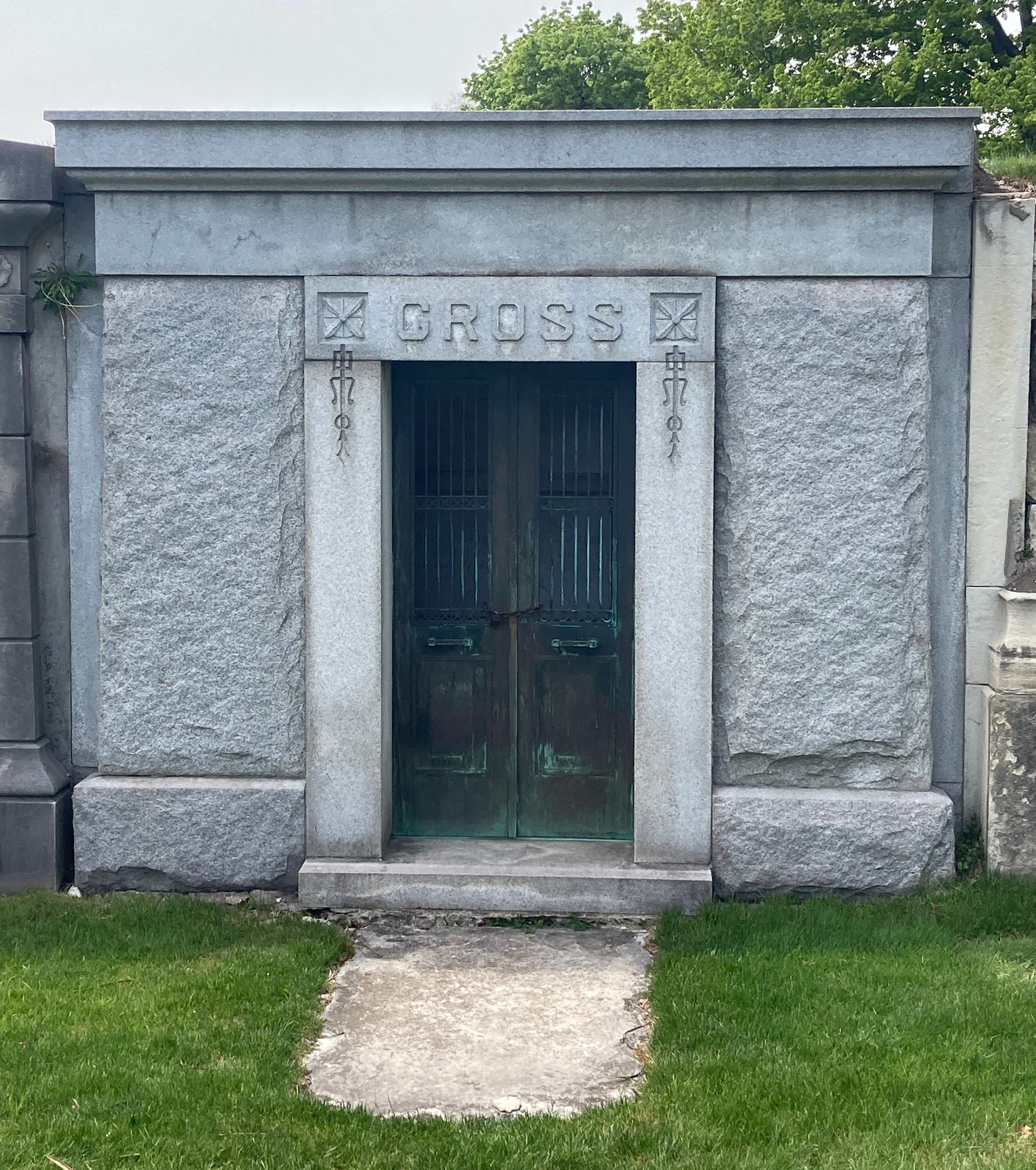
Gross's mausoleum at Graceland Cemetery

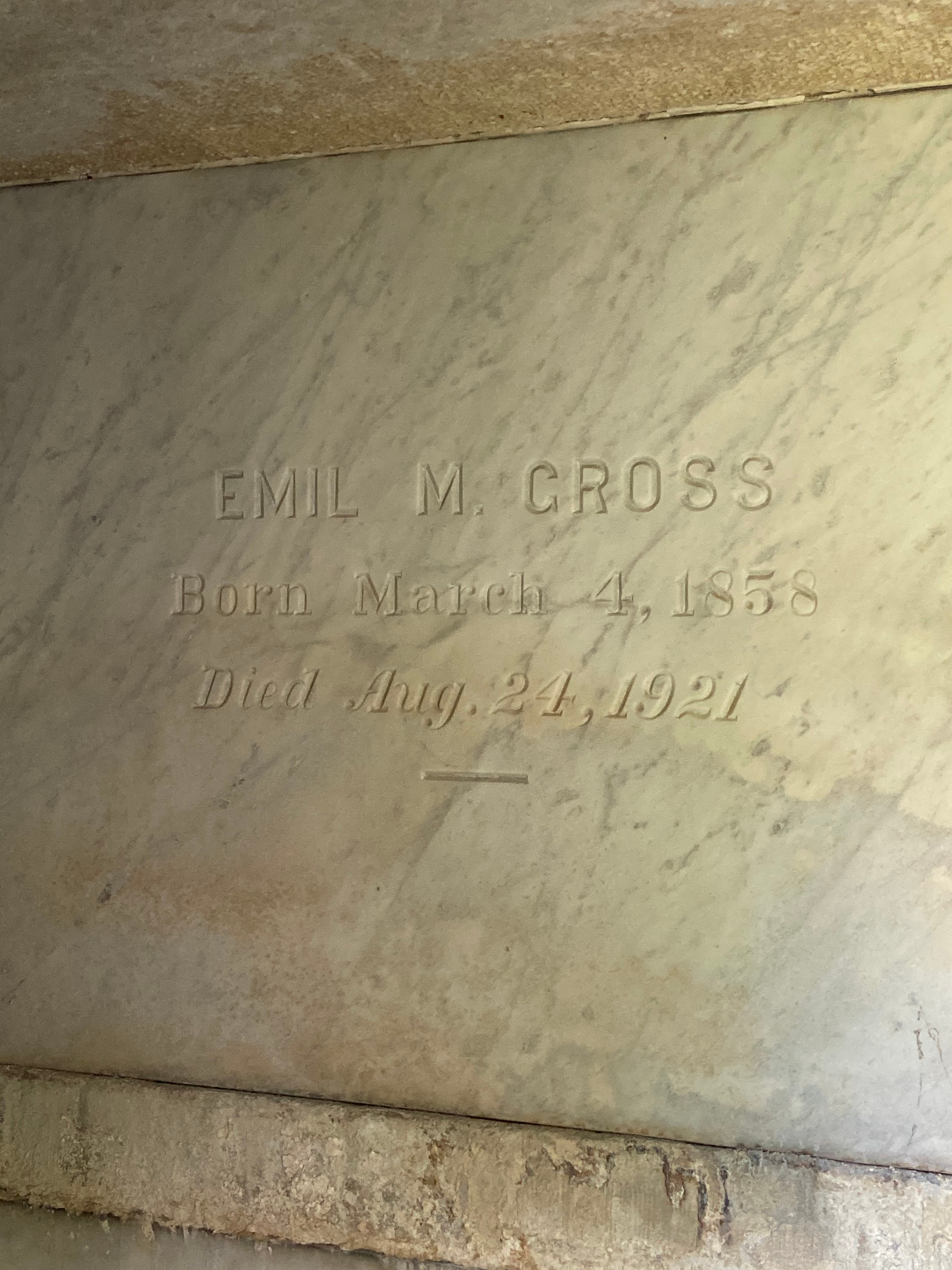
Gross's grave at Graceland Cemetery

By 1889, Gross was described as "an extensive property owner in Chicago." His mother had recently left him a sum in excess of $100,000. In 1909, Gross was reported to be a businessman in Chicago. Gross died in 1921 at age 63 in Eagle River, Wisconsin. He was buried in Chicago at Graceland Cemetery.
