= Charlie Osterhout =

American baseball player (1856–1933)

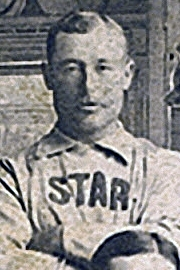
- Outfielder/Catcher
- Born: June 1856; Syracuse, New York
- Died: May 21, 1933 (aged 76); Syracuse, New York
- Batted: Unknown Threw: Right

MLB debut
- June 23, 1879, for the Syracuse Stars

Last MLB appearance
- September 6, 1879, for the Syracuse Stars

MLB statistics
- At bats: 8
- RBI: 0
- Home runs: 0
- Batting average: .000
- Stats at Baseball Reference

Teams
- Syracuse Stars (1879)

Charles H. Osterhout (1856–1933) was an American professional baseball player who played for the 1879 Syracuse Stars.
