= Magner =

Magner is a surname. Notable people with the surname include:

- Aron Magner, American musician with Disco Biscuits
- Colm Magner, Canadian actor, writer, and director
- Francis Joseph Magner (1887–1947), American Roman Catholic bishop
- John Magner, baseball player
- Michael Magner (1840–1897), Irish soldier, recipient of the Victoria Cross
- Stubby Magner, baseball player
- Ted Magner (1891–1948), English football manager
- Thomas F. Magner, U.S. Representative from New York state
- William Magner, Irish cider manufacturer, connected with Magners
