= Blondie Purcell =

American baseball player

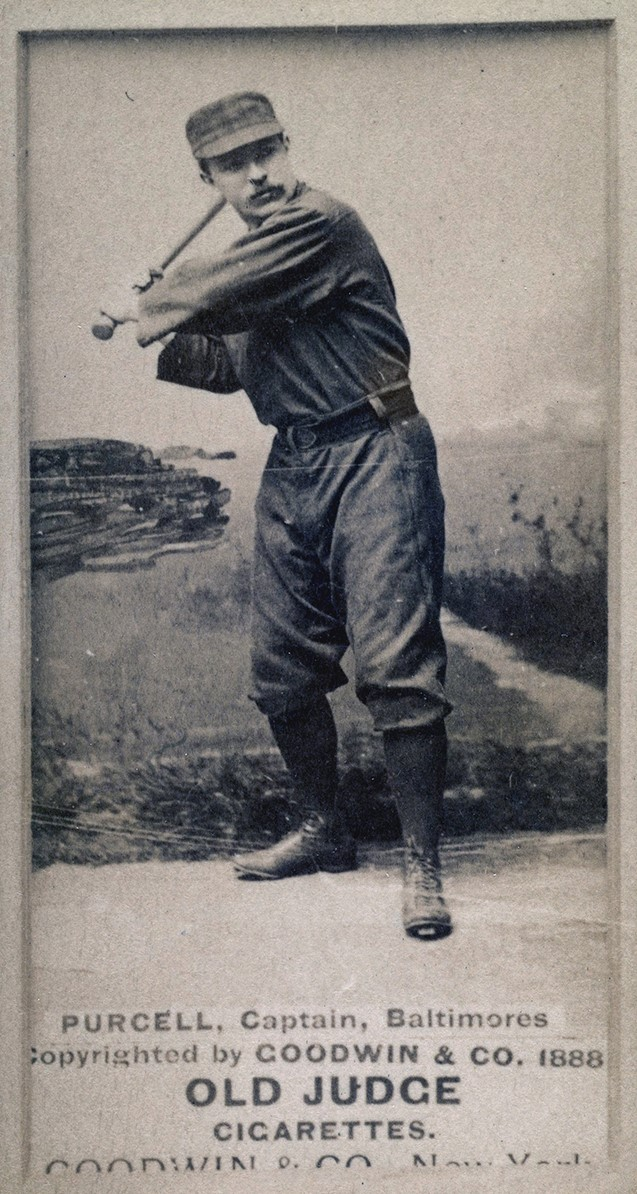
- 1888 baseball card of Purcell
- Outfielder
- Born: March 16, 1854; Paterson, New Jersey, U.S.
- Died: May 27, 1929 (aged 75); Philadelphia, PA
- Batted: Right Threw: Right

MLB debut
- May 1, 1879, for the Syracuse Stars

Last MLB appearance
- September 16, 1890, for the Philadelphia Athletics

MLB statistics
- Batting average: .267
- Home runs: 13
- Runs batted in: 495
- Stats at Baseball Reference

Teams
- As player: Syracuse Stars (1879); Cincinnati Reds (1879); Cincinnati Stars (1880); Cleveland Blues (1881); Buffalo Bisons (1881–1882); Philadelphia Phillies (1883–1884); Philadelphia Athletics (1885); Boston Beaneaters (1885); Baltimore Orioles (1886–1888); Philadelphia Athletics (1888–1890); As manager: Philadelphia Phillies (1883)

William Aloysius "Blondie" Purcell (born March 16, 1854; died May 27, 1929) was an American Major League Baseball player born in Paterson, New Jersey. He played for nine different major league teams from 1879 to 1890. Purcell played mainly as an outfielder, and he was also a pitcher in 79 games.

== Career ==
On June 6, 1882, while playing for the Buffalo Bisons, Purcell was fined $10 ($334 today) for slicing open a soggy baseball. He did this to compel the umpire to put a fresh ball in play so his pitcher, Pud Galvin, would be able to throw his curveball.

Purcell was the first player to get a hit and also score a run in Philadelphia Phillies franchise history, doing so in his first at bat of the 1883 season.

In 1883, Purcell was the player-manager for the Philadelphia Phillies in their inaugural season.. He took the reins of the team after 17 games, when they were only 4–13 under player-manager Bob Ferguson, and finished the season with a dismal 17–81 record. The eighth-place Phillies finished 23 games behind the seventh-place Detroit Wolverines. Purcell never managed again in the major leagues.

Purcell finished his professional baseball career with the ill-fated 1890 Philadelphia Athletics. In 1,097 career games, he had 1,217 hits and a .267 batting average. As a pitcher, he had a win–loss record of 15–43.

Purcell ran a bookmaking operation during his playing career and continued to do so afterwards.

Purcell died on May 27, 1929 in Philadelphia and is buried at Westminster Cemetery in Bala Cynwyd, Pennsylvania.

== See also ==
- List of Major League Baseball player-managers
