= Mike Burke (shortstop) =

American baseball player (1854–1889)

- Shortstop
- Born: 1854; New York City
- Died: June 9, 1889 (aged 34–35); Albany, New York
- Batted: Right Threw: Right

MLB debut
- May 1, 1879, for the Cincinnati Reds

Last MLB appearance
- July 19, 1879, for the Cincinnati Reds

MLB statistics
- Batting average: .222
- Runs: 13
- Runs batted in: 8
- Stats at Baseball Reference

Teams
- Cincinnati Reds (1879)

Michael E. Burke (1854 – June 9, 1889) was an American Major League Baseball player who played mainly shortstop for the 1879 Cincinnati Reds of the National League. In 28 games, he had 26 hits in 117 at bats for a .222 batting average, scored 13 Runs, and hit three doubles. He died at the age of 34 or 35 in Albany, New York, and is interred at St. Agnes Cemetery in Menands, New York.
