= Aaron Clapp =

American baseball player (1856–1914)

- First baseman
- Born: July 1856; Ithaca, New York, U.S.
- Died: January 13, 1914 (aged 57); Sayre, Pennsylvania, U.S.
- Batted: Unknown Threw: Right

MLB debut
- May 1, 1879, for the Troy Trojans

Last MLB appearance
- 1879, for the Troy Trojans

MLB statistics
- Batting average: .267
- Home runs: 0
- Runs batted in: 18
- Stats at Baseball Reference

Teams
- Troy Trojans (1879)

Aaron Bronson Clapp (July 1856 – January 13, 1914) was an American first baseman in Major League Baseball for the 1879 Troy Trojans. Born in Ithaca, New York, Clapp was the younger brother, John Clapp, one of the greatest catchers of his day.

Clapp moved to Sayre, Pennsylvania, around the turn of the century, and was working as a foreman of a paint shop. He died in Sayre of cancer in 1914.
