= Sonny Hoffman =

American baseball player

- Catcher / Outfielder
- Born: c. 1853; Cleveland, Ohio
- Died: Unknown
- Batted: Unknown Threw: Unknown

MLB debut
- May 10, 1879, for the Cleveland Blues

Last MLB appearance
- July 19, 1879, for the Cleveland Blues

MLB statistics
- Games played: 2
- At bats: 6
- Hits: 0
- Stats at Baseball Reference

Teams
- Cleveland Blues (1879)

William A. "Sonny" Hoffman was a professional baseball player. He played in two games for the 1879 Cleveland Blues as a temporary fill-in due to an injury to Doc Kennedy.
