= Bill Hague =

American baseball player (1852–1898)

- Third baseman
- Born: 1852; Philadelphia, Pennsylvania, U.S.
- Died: November 21, 1898; Philadelphia, Pennsylvania, U.S.
- Batted: Right Threw: Right

MLB debut
- May 4, 1875, for the St. Louis Brown Stockings

Last MLB appearance
- August 15, 1879, for the Providence Grays

MLB statistics
- Batting average: .237
- Home runs: 2
- Runs batted in: 114
- Stats at Baseball Reference

Teams
- St. Louis Brown Stockings (1875); Louisville Grays (1876–1877); Providence Grays (1878–1879)

William L. Hague (né Haug; 1852 – November 21, 1898) was an American Major League Baseball player who played as a third baseman from 1875 to 1879, for three teams: the St. Louis Brown Stockings of the National Association, the Louisville Grays and the Providence Grays, both of the National League.
