= Herm Doscher =

American baseball player (1852–1934)

- Third baseman/Umpire
- Born: December 20, 1852; New York City, New York, U.S.
- Died: March 20, 1934 (aged 81); Buffalo, New York, U.S.
- Batted: Right Threw: Right

MLB debut
- September 5, 1872, for the Brooklyn Atlantics

Last MLB appearance
- August 4, 1882, for the Cleveland Blues

MLB statistics
- Batting average: .225
- Home runs: 0
- Runs batted in: 40
- Stats at Baseball Reference

Teams
- Brooklyn Atlantics (1872–1873); Washington Nationals (1875); Troy Trojans (1879); Chicago White Stockings (1879); Cleveland Blues (1881–1882)

Career highlights and awards
- As an umpire, called two no-hitters

John Henry "Herm" Doscher, Sr. (December 20, 1852 – March 20, 1934) was an American third baseman and umpire in the early years of professional baseball, playing for five different teams in the National Association and National League from 1872 though 1882. He also served as a regular umpire in both early major leagues, the NL (1880–81) and American Association (1887–88, 1890). His son Jack was a major league pitcher for several years, mainly for the Brooklyn Superbas. Jack Doscher was the first son of a major leaguer to also play in the majors. His name is pronounced like dusher.

== Playing career ==
Born in New York City, Doscher began his playing career in the National Association with the 1872 Brooklyn Atlantics as a right fielder. He only played in six games that year, but batted .360, and played in only one game in the 1873 season, also in Brooklyn. He didn't play in the Association in 1874, but did return for the 1875 season when he played in 22 games, all at third base, for the Washington Nationals. He didn't hit very well, and was only able to play in the minor leagues for the next few seasons. One of his stops was with the London Tecumsehs in 1877, a team that went on to win the championship that season.

He reached the National League again in 1879, when he joined the Troy Trojans. After that season, Doscher was named to the NL umpiring staff, and he worked 51 games in 1880 and 79 in 1881 before returning to the playing ranks with five games for his newest and last team, the Cleveland Blues. He appeared in 25 games in 1882, ending his playing career.

== Mistaken expulsion and reinstatement ==
In 1882, he accepted a temporary job as a scout with Cleveland, even though he had signed a contract with the Detroit Wolverines for the 1883 season. The Cleveland directors had him expelled from the league for "embezzelment and obtaining money under false pretense". It was later proven in NYC court that the original contract was never signed by Detroit, voiding the original contract. He was unanimously reinstated in 1886, and returned to umpiring in the American Association in 1887.

== Umpiring career ==
Known as a colorful, but a no-nonsense, hardline player, he was a natural to the umpiring profession. Once quoted as saying "I've got to play ring master, school teacher, poppa and momma, and doctor in every game", he would use any tactic he could to control the game, even physical force if necessary.

His full-time return as an umpire lasted just three season, 1887, 1888 and 1890, but his officiating career was not without notable occurrences. He was involved in two no-hitters; one occurred on August 19, 1880, when he was the umpire for Larry Corcoran's no-hitter, just the fourth no-hitter thrown in the major leagues. The other was Adonis Terry's no-hitter on May 27, 1888, Terry's second career no-hitter.

On September 21, 1890, with the Rochester Broncos at the St. Louis Browns in the second game of a doubleheader, and St. Louis leading 10–3 in the eighth inning, Doscher ejected Rochester's Sandy Griffin for arguing and called an end to game, giving the victory to St. Louis because Griffin refused to leave the field. It was Doscher's only forfeit on record as an umpire.

== Later years ==
Doscher's occupations in subsequent years include work as a scout; the discovery of future Hall of Famer Willie Keeler is attributed to him. Doscher died in Buffalo, New York at the age of 81, and was interred at Elmlawn Cemetery in Tonawanda, New York.
