= John Magner =

American baseball player (born 1855)

- Outfielder
- Born: 1855; St. Louis, Missouri, U.S.
- Died: Unknown
- Batted: Unknown Threw: Unknown

MLB debut
- July 14, 1879, for the Cincinnati Reds

Last MLB appearance
- July 14, 1879, for the Cincinnati Reds

MLB statistics
- Batting average: .000
- At bats: 4
- Runs batted in: 1
- Stats at Baseball Reference

Teams
- Cincinnati Reds (1879)

John T. Magner was an American professional baseball outfielder. He played one game in Major League Baseball for the Cincinnati Reds on July 14, 1879.
