= 1879 Boston Red Caps season =

1879 Boston Red Caps
- League: National League
- Ballpark: South End Grounds
- City: Boston, Massachusetts
- Record: 54–30 (.643)
- League place: 2nd
- Owner: Arthur Soden
- Manager: Harry Wright

The 1879 Boston Red Caps season was the ninth season of the franchise.

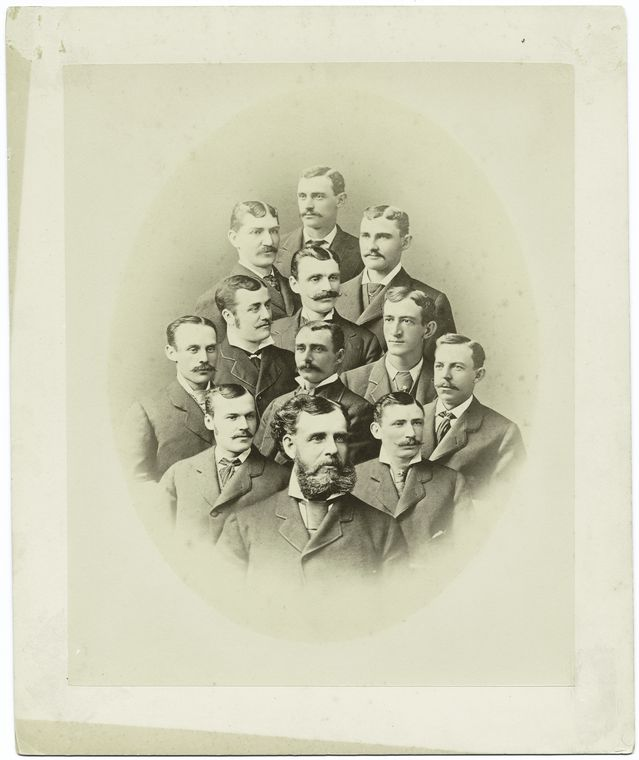
Boston, 1879, Thos. Bond, Jno. Morrill, Chas. Snyder, Chas. W. Jones, J. J. Burdock, Edw. Cogswell, S. Houck, Jno. E. B. Sutton, W. Hawes, Chas. Foley, Harry Wright

== Regular season ==
=== Season standings ===
National League
Team	W	L	Pct.	GB	Home	Road
Providence Grays	59	25	.702	—	34‍–‍8	25‍–‍17
Boston Red Caps	54	30	.643	5	29‍–‍13	25‍–‍17
Buffalo Bisons	46	32	.590	10	23‍–‍16	23‍–‍16
Chicago White Stockings	46	33	.582	10½	29‍–‍13	17‍–‍20
Cincinnati Reds	43	37	.537	14	21‍–‍16	22‍–‍21
Cleveland Blues	27	55	.329	31	15‍–‍27	12‍–‍28
Syracuse Stars	22	48	.314	30	11‍–‍22	11‍–‍26
Troy Trojans	19	56	.253	35½	12‍–‍27	7‍–‍29

=== Record vs. opponents ===
1879 National League record Sources:
Team	BSN	BUF	CHI	CIN	CLE	PRO	SYR	TRO
Boston	—	9–3	4–8	7–5	10–2	4–8	9–3	11–1
Buffalo	3–9	—	6–6–1	7–3	8–4	6–6	5–3	11–1
Chicago	8–4	6–6–1	—	3–8	8–4	5–7–1	8–1	8–3–2
Cincinnati	5–7	3–7	8–3	—	8–4	2–10	8–4–1	9–2
Cleveland	2–10	4–8	4–8	4–8	—	4–8	4–7	5–6
Providence	8–4	6–6	7–5–1	10–2	8–4	—	10–2	10–2
Syracuse	3–9	3–5	1–8	4–8–1	7–4	2–10	—	2–4
Troy	1–11	1–11	3–8–2	2–9	6–5	2–10	4–2	—

=== Roster ===
1879 Boston Red Caps
Roster
Pitchers: Tommy Bond; Curry Foley; Lee Richmond; Jim Tyng	Catchers: Pop Snyder; Infielders: Jack Burdock; Ed Cogswell; John Morrill; Ezra Sutton	Outfielders: Bill Hawes; Sadie Houck; Charley Jones; John O'Rourke	Manager: Harry Wright

== Player stats ==
=== Batting ===
==== Starters by position ====
Note: Pos = Position; G = Games played; AB = At bats; H = Hits; Avg. = Batting average; HR = Home runs; RBI = Runs batted in

Pos	Player	G	AB	H	Avg.	HR	RBI
C	Pop Snyder	81	329	78	.237	2	35
1B	Ed Cogswell	49	236	76	.322	1	18
2B	Jack Burdock	84	359	86	.240	0	36
3B	John Morrill	84	348	98	.282	0	49
SS	Ezra Sutton	84	339	84	.248	0	34
OF	Charley Jones	83	355	112	.315	9	62
OF	John O'Rourke	72	317	108	.341	6	62
OF	Sadie Houck	80	356	95	.267	2	49

==== Other batters ====
Note: G = Games played; AB = At bats; H = Hits; Avg. = Batting average; HR = Home runs; RBI = Runs batted in

Player	G	AB	H	Avg.	HR	RBI
Bill Hawes	38	155	31	.200	0	9

=== Pitching ===
==== Starting pitchers ====
Note: G = Games pitched; IP = Innings pitched; W = Wins; L = Losses; ERA = Earned run average; SO = Strikeouts

Player	G	IP	W	L	ERA	SO
Tommy Bond	64	555.1	43	19	1.96	155
Curry Foley	21	161.2	9	9	2.51	57
Jim Tyng	3	27.0	1	2	5.00	7
Lee Richmond	1	9.0	1	0	2.00	11
