= Lee Fyfe =

American baseball umpire (1879-1942)

- Born: Lucius Columbus Fyfe; July 31, 1879; Illinois, U.S.
- Died: May 30, 1942 (aged 62); Saginaw, Michigan, U.S.
- Resting place: Forest Lawn Cemetery (Saginaw, Michigan)
- Occupation: Umpire
- Years active: 1915 (FL), 1920 (NL)
- Employer(s): Federal League, National League

Lucius Columbus "Lee" Fyfe (July 31, 1879 – May 30, 1942) was an American professional baseball umpire.

Fyfe umpired 84 Federal League games in the 1915 season. He then returned to the Majors, where he umpired in five National League games in 1920.
