= Tom Dolan (baseball) =

American baseball player (1855–1913)

- Catcher
- Born: January 10, 1855; New York City, New York, U.S.
- Died: January 16, 1913 (aged 58); St. Louis, Missouri, U.S.
- Batted: Right Threw: Right

MLB debut
- September 30, 1879, for the Chicago White Stockings

Last MLB appearance
- October 14, 1888, for the St. Louis Browns

MLB statistics
- Batting average: .204
- Home runs: 1
- Hits: 119
- Stats at Baseball Reference

Teams
- Chicago White Stockings (1879); Buffalo Bisons (1882); St. Louis Browns (1883–1884); St. Louis Maroons (1884–1886); Baltimore Orioles (1886); St. Louis Browns (1888)

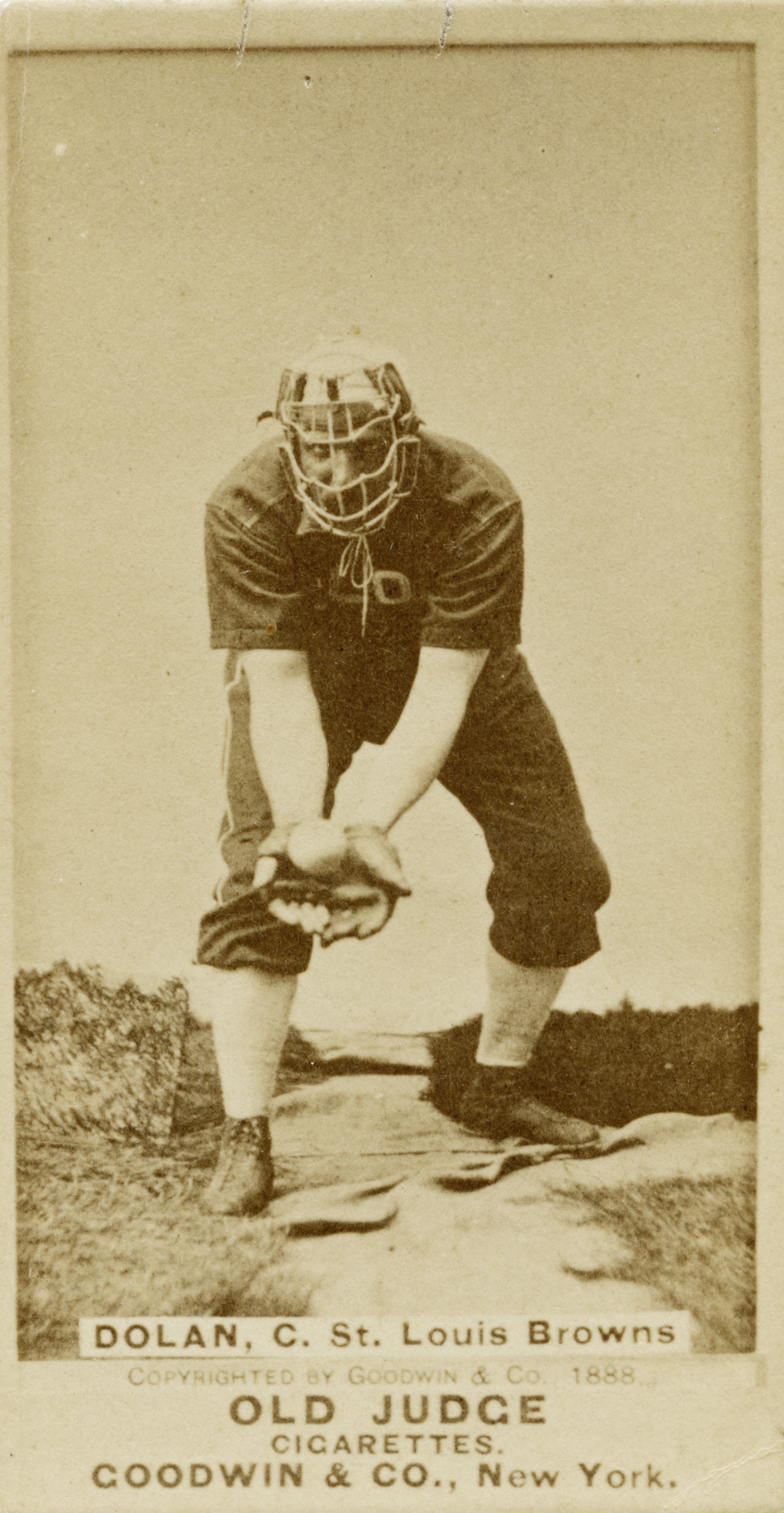
Baseball card featuring Dolan.

Thomas J. Dolan (January 10, 1855 – January 16, 1913) was an American player in Major League Baseball. Dolan was primarily a catcher, but also played outfield, third base, and pitched four innings.
