= Lew Brown (baseball) =

American baseball player (1858–1889)

- Catcher/First baseman
- Born: February 1, 1858; Leominster, Massachusetts, U.S.
- Died: January 15, 1889 (aged 30); Boston, Massachusetts, U.S.
- Batted: Right Threw: Right

MLB debut
- June 17, 1876, for the Boston Red Caps

Last MLB appearance
- October 19, 1884, for the Boston Reds

MLB statistics
- Batting average: .248
- Home runs: 10
- Runs batted in: 169
- Stats at Baseball Reference

Teams
- Boston Red Caps (1876–1877); Providence Grays (1878–1879); Chicago White Stockings (1879); Detroit Wolverines (1881); Providence Grays (1881); Boston Beaneaters (1883); Louisville Eclipse (1883); Boston Reds (1884)

Lewis J. Brown (February 1, 1858 – January 15, 1889) was an American Major League Baseball catcher and first baseman for seven seasons and played for six different teams from 1876 to 1884. Brown was primarily a catcher, but he also logged over 100 games as a first baseman. He also appeared twice as a pitcher.

== Career ==
Before playing in the major leagues, Brown was a member of the Boston Stars, a popular amateur team that played at Boston Common. He was teammates on that club with future major league player John Morrill.

In 1876, Brown debuted in the major leagues. Two of his early teams - the 1877 Boston Red Caps and the 1879 Providence Grays - won league pennants. Brown missed the 1882 season due to being blacklisted for "confirmed dissipation and general insubordination." He retired from baseball after the 1884 season.

== After baseball ==
By 1887, he was working as a bartender at the Saracen's Head, a Boston saloon run by the widow of boxer Joe Goss. He played in a benefit game that year with other retired players at the South End Grounds, and he had gained a surprising amount of weight since leaving baseball. By July 1888, Brown said that he had reduced his weight to 214 pounds and that he was hoping to play baseball again.

== Death ==
In 1889, Brown died at the Boston City Hospital at the age of 30. The Chicago Tribune explained further: One night at the Saracen's Head, Brown was engaged in a friendly wrestling match with a customer, and the men did not stop wrestling when Mrs. Goss asked them to do so. She became angry and swung at the men with a piece of gas pipe, striking Brown in the knee. The injury led to the amputation of Brown's leg, and he was said to have been left in a weak and delirious state. He died of pneumonia during that hospitalization.

Brown is interred at Forest Hills Cemetery.
