= Jack Farrell =

American baseball player (1857–1914)

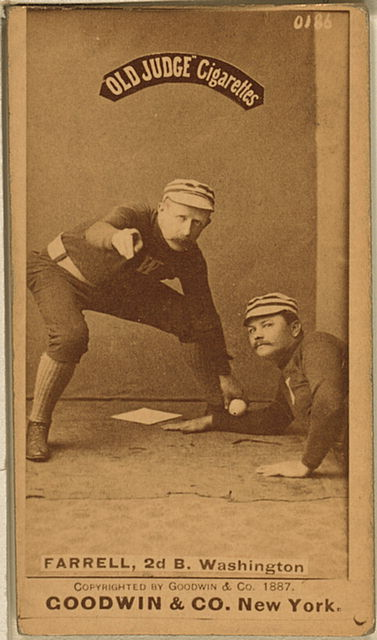
- Second baseman
- Born: July 5, 1857; Newark, New Jersey, U.S.
- Died: February 9, 1914 (aged 56); Cedar Grove, New Jersey, U.S.
- Batted: Right Threw: Right

MLB debut
- May 1, 1879, for the Syracuse Stars

Last MLB appearance
- June 11, 1889, for the Baltimore Orioles

MLB statistics
- Batting average: .243
- Home runs: 23
- Runs batted in: 370
- Stats at Baseball Reference

Teams
- As player: Syracuse Stars (1879); Providence Grays (1879–1885); Philadelphia Quakers (1886); Washington Nationals (1886–1887); Baltimore Orioles (1888–1889); As manager: Providence Grays (1881)

John A. Farrell (July 5, 1857 – February 9, 1914), also known as "Moose", was an American Major League Baseball player who played mainly second base in his 11 seasons. Born in Newark, New Jersey, Farrell made his major league debut for the 1879 Syracuse Stars of the National League, where he played the majority of that season, until moving onto the Providence Grays, where he played the next six seasons. His career numbers include 877 hits in 884 games played, 23 home runs, and a .243 batting average. In 1881, he began the season as the player-manager for the Grays, compiling a 24 win, 27 loss record. On August 3, Farrell quit as "captain" of the team. He was succeeded by outfielder Tom York, and the team finished the season with 23 wins against 10 losses, good for second place.

Farrell died in Cedar Grove, New Jersey at the age of 56, and was buried at the Holy Sepulchre Cemetery in East Orange, New Jersey.

== See also ==
- List of Major League Baseball player–managers
