= Syracuse Stars (National League) =

Information
- Location: Based in Syracuse, New York
- Founded: 1877
- Folded: 1879
- Former leagues: National League (1879); International Association (1878)
- Former ballpark: Newell Park
- Colors: Purple, white
- Manager: Jimmy Macullar (1879); Bill Holbert (1879); Mike Dorgan (1879)

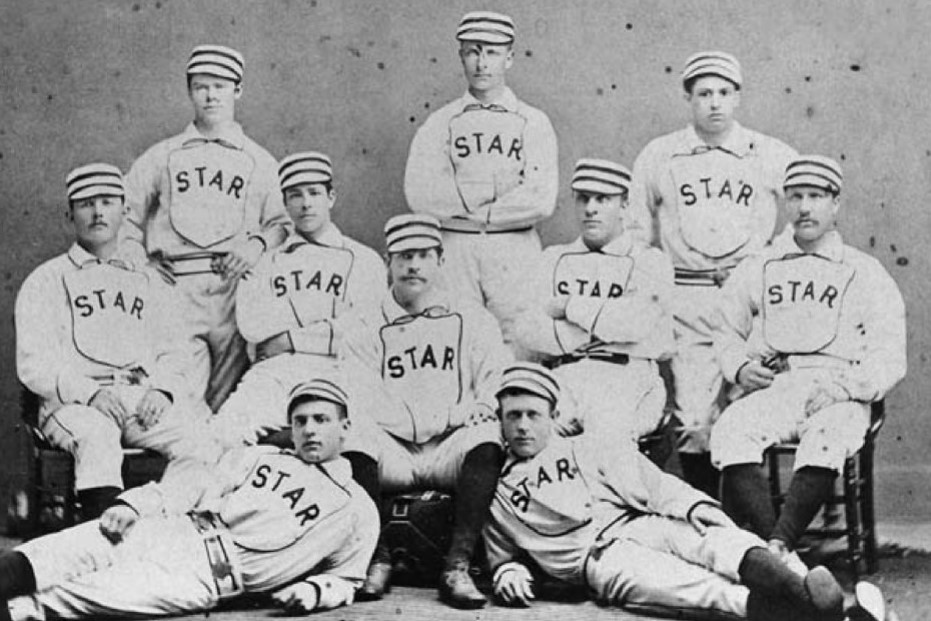
The independent Syracuse Stars of 1877, direct forerunner of the major league Stars of 1879.

The Syracuse Stars were a 19th-century American baseball team, as well as the name of the minor league baseball teams which preceded it, based in Syracuse, New York. They played their home games at Newell Park. (They were unrelated to the Syracuse Stars of the American Association, who played for one year, in 1890.)

Established as an independent team in 1877, the Stars joined the International Association for the 1878 season. They finished second to the pennant-winning Buffalo Bisons, and following the season both teams jumped to the National League, a devastating blow for the IA, which lasted just two more seasons.

The Stars lone year in the NL, 1879, was not so successful. The team had a record of 22 wins and 48 losses, and did not finish their season, folding on September 10. They were 7th in the 8-team National League, ahead of the 19–56 Troy Trojans, who also did not complete their schedule. The club officially disbanded at the end of the season.

Mike Dorgan managed 43 of the Stars' games (with a 17–26 record). Bill Holbert managed on an interim basis for one game (a loss) and the season was closed out by Jimmy Macullar, who managed the final 26 games (5–21).

The team had a combined batting average of .227. First baseman Jack Farrell led the team with .303.

== See also ==
- 1879 Syracuse Stars season
