= Providence Grays =

Former Major League Baseball team

- Founded: 1878
- Folded: 1885
- League: National League
- Location: Providence, Rhode Island
- Ballpark: Messer Street Grounds
- Colors: Steel Gray, Gray, Light Blue
- Owner: C. T. Gardner (1882–1885); Henry Root (1878–1881)
- Manager: Frank Bancroft (1884–1885); Harry Wright (1882–1883); Jack Farrell & Tom York (1881); Mike McGeary, John Montgomery Ward & Mike Dorgan (1880); George Wright (1879); Tom York (1878)
- Championships: 1884
- League titles: 1879, 1884

The Providence Grays were a Major League Baseball team based in Providence, Rhode Island who played in the National League from 1878 until 1885. The Grays played at the Messer Street Grounds in the Olneyville neighborhood. The team won the National League title twice, in 1879 and 1884. Following the 1884 season, they won the World Series over the New York Metropolitans of the American Association. The team folded after the 1885 season.

== Origins and formation ==
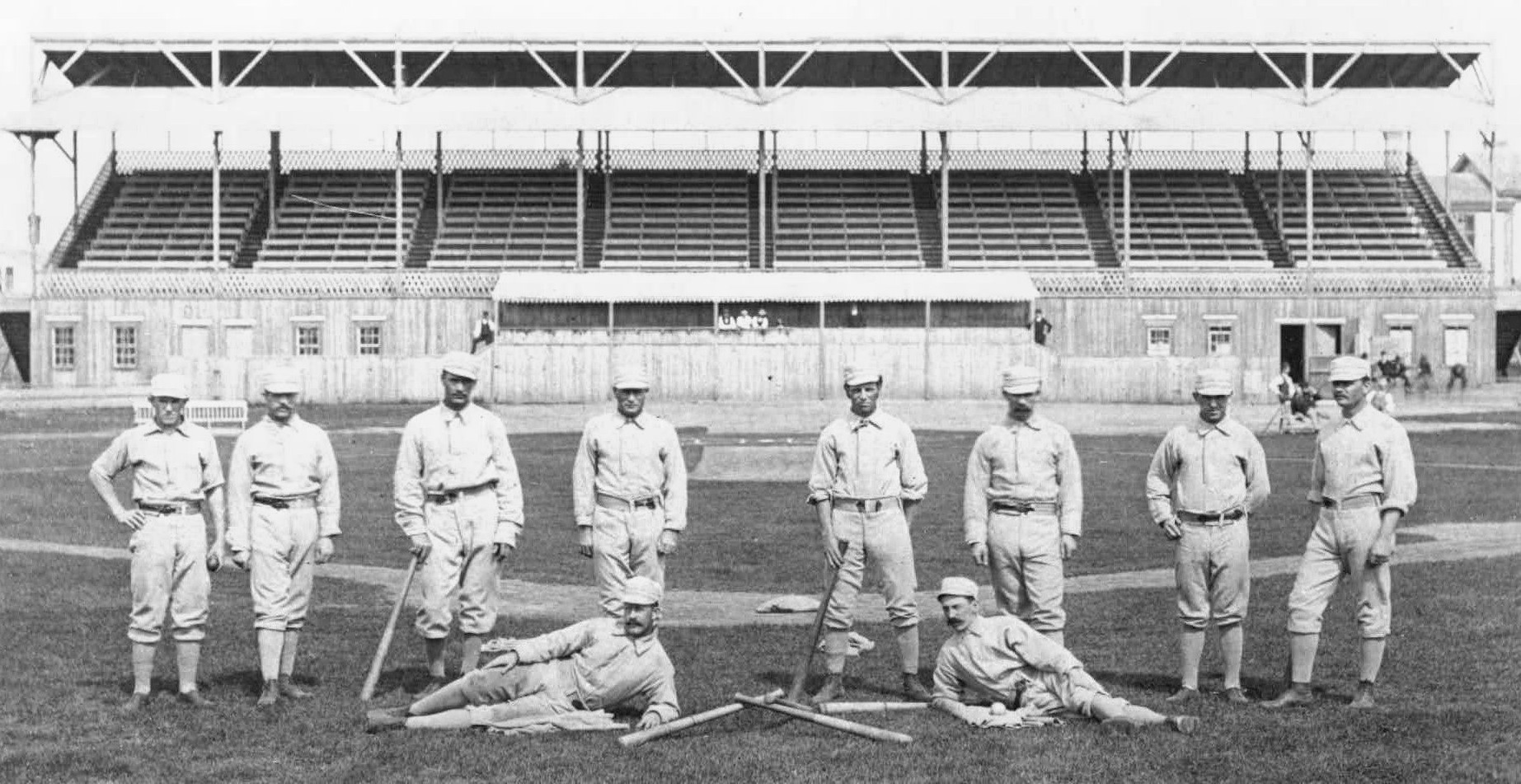
1879 National League champion Providence Grays

Rhode Island was a hotbed of baseball in the 1870s with several notable amateur clubs along with Brown University's powerhouse collegiate team. In 1875, the semi-pro "Rhode Islands" were formed. After successful seasons (along with excellent paid attendance) in 1875, 1876, and 1877, the team drew the attention of the recently formed National League. When the League elected to drop the Hartford franchise after the 1877 season, Providence was awarded a franchise to replace the Connecticut club.

The new team was officially organized on January 16, 1878 by Benjamin Douglas, who became the team's general manager. Henry Root was hired as the team president‚ and Tom Carey was initially hired to be the on-field captain, whose duties were similar to the modern-day manager. On January 21, 1878, Providence applied for membership in the NL, and was officially approved on February 6.

On April 10, Root took over ownership of the team, fired Douglas for incompetence and insubordination, and hired Tom York to replace Carey as captain. On May 30, the Providence Base Ball Association was incorporated by the Rhode Island General Assembly.

While the team practiced at the Dexter Training Ground in the spring of 1878, preparations were made to provide them with "the best baseball plant in the country". Construction on the Messer Street Grounds began on April 1 and took exactly one month to complete; the final nail was hammered a mere five minutes before the opening game got underway on May 1.

The following season the team installed a screen behind home plate to protect the fans sitting there from injury due to foul balls and wild pitches. They were the first team in baseball history to do this; while some fans protested, complaining that they obstructed their view of the game, by the end of the next decade they were commonplace.

In a break with tradition, the National League's newest addition adopted gray flannel instead of white for their home uniform and the team became known as the Grays.

== 1879 champions ==
One of the leading players from the 1879 pennant winner was Hall of Famer John Montgomery Ward.

The Grays may also have the distinction of being the first Major League Baseball team to field an African-American baseball player, William Edward White, a Brown University student who played one game for the Grays on June 21, 1879. While the evidence is strong, it is not conclusive: Peter Morris of the Society for American Baseball Research has researched this issue, as reported by the Wall Street Journal in 2004. Work by the Society for American Baseball Research (SABR) suggests that he may have been the first African-American to play major league baseball, predating the longer careers of Moses Fleetwood Walker and his brother Weldy Walker by five years, and Jackie Robinson by 68 years.

== 1884 champions ==
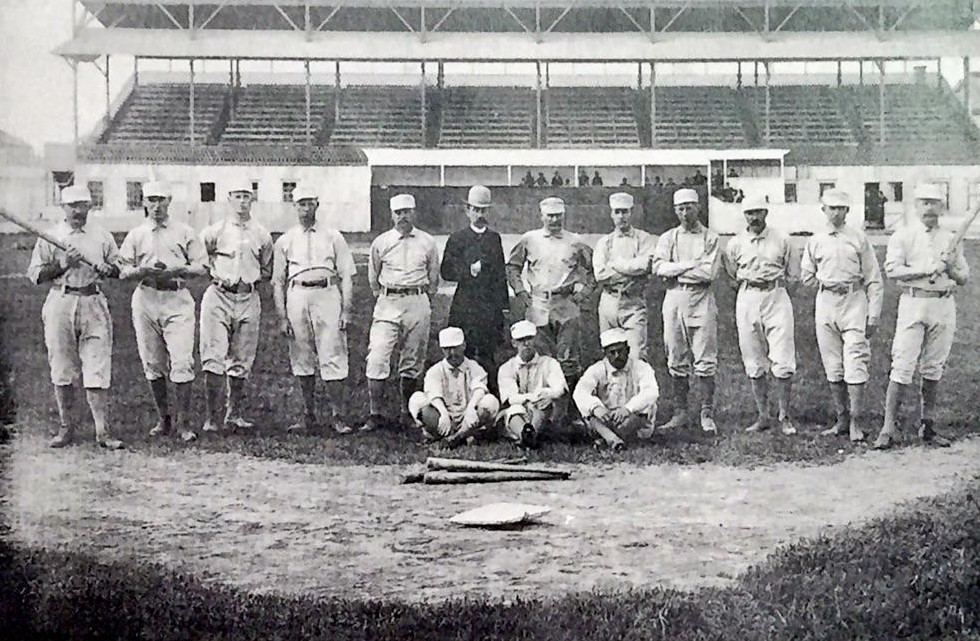
1884 National League and World Series champion Providence Grays

The 1884 team was led by ace pitcher Charles "Old Hoss" Radbourn (sometimes spelled Radbourne), who won a record 60 (59, according to some sources) games that year and led the Grays to the pennant. When the team's other star pitcher, Charlie Sweeney, defected to the rival Union Association league in July, it looked like the Grays' season was doomed, but "Old Hoss" offered to pitch the rest of the team's games. The Grays went on a 20-game winning streak and topped the league ahead of their New England rivals, the Boston Red Stockings.

At the close of the season, Providence officials accepted New York Metropolitans (AA) manager Jim Mutrie's challenge to a three-game postseason match. All of the games took place at the Polo Grounds in New York and were played under American Association rules, which forbade overhand pitching.

On October 23, 1884, the Providence Grays (NL) whitewashed the New York Metropolitans (AA), 6–0, behind Radbourn, in what is considered to be the first official postseason interleague game. Radbourn allowed two hits and struck out nine. Tim Keefe was the losing pitcher. The very next day, Radbourn three-hit the Metropolitans and won 3–1 in a game called after seven innings due to darkness. Grays third baseman Jerry Denny hit a three-run homer in the fifth inning. It was the first home run in World Series history. Keefe lost for the second time. On October 25, 1884 the Grays defeated the Metropolitans, 11–2, in the final game of the series. Radbourn won for the third time in three days. Buck Becannon took the loss as Keefe umpired the contest.

Although post-season games prior to 1903 were considered exhibitions, the 1884 World Series is recognized today as the first inter-league postseason championship. This would be Providence's last appearance in a World Series. Due to financial problems, the team folded in 1885.

== Other highlights ==
Other memorable highlights of the Grays' short existence include the second perfect game in MLB history, pitched by John Montgomery Ward on June 17, 1880; a no-hitter by Charles Radbourn on July 25, 1883; and pitcher Charlie Sweeney striking out 19 batters in a nine-inning game on June 7, 1884, a record that would stand until broken by Roger Clemens 102 years later. They also still hold the record for the largest score in a shutout victory, with a 28–0 victory over the Philadelphia Phillies on August 21, 1883.

== Season records ==
Season	Record	Pct.	Result
1878	33–27	.550	Third place
1879	59–25	.702	Won National League pennant
1880	52–32	.619	Second place
1881	47–37	.560	Second place
1882	52–32	.619	Second place
1883	58–40	.592	Third place
1884	84–28	.750	Won National League pennant
1885	53–57	.482	Fourth place

== Notable alumni ==
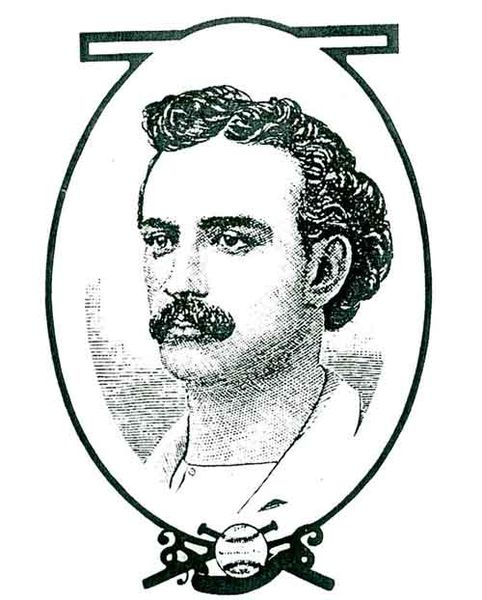
Lip Pike

- Lip Pike: Major League Baseball four-time home run champion; first prominent Jewish player
- Arthur Irwin: used first fielder's mitt; shortstop on 1884 World Series team
- William Edward White: played his first and only game with the Providence Grays on June 21, 1879. According to SABR, he was the first black player in the history of major-league baseball.

=== Baseball Hall of Famers ===
Providence Grays Hall of Famers
Inductee	Position	Tenure	Inducted	Notes
John Montgomery Ward	SS/2B/P	1878–1882	1964	Founder of the first players' union
Jim O'Rourke	OF	1879	1945	
Charles Radbourn	P	1881–1885	1939	Holds single-season wins record for a pitcher (59)
George Wright	SS	1879, 1882	1937	Player-manager of the 1879 National League championship squad
Harry Wright	Manager	1882–1883	1953	Manager of the 1882 and 1883 squads

== See also ==
- 1884 World Series
- 1878 Providence Grays season
- 1879 Providence Grays season
- 1880 Providence Grays season
- 1881 Providence Grays season
- 1882 Providence Grays season
- 1883 Providence Grays season
- 1884 Providence Grays season
- 1885 Providence Grays season
- Providence Grays all-time roster
- List of pre-World Series baseball champions
