= 1879 in baseball =

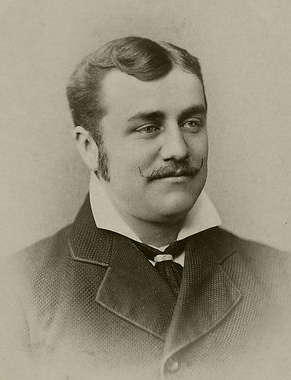
Charley Jones, Boston Red Caps, Left Field, 1879

The following are the baseball events of the year 1879 throughout the world.

== Champions ==
- National League: Providence Grays
- National Association: Albany Blue Stockings
- Northwestern League: Dubuque Rabbits

Inter-league playoff: Providence Grays (NL) defeat Albany Blues (NA), 2 games to 0.

== Statistical leaders ==
National League
Stat	Player	Total
AVG	Paul Hines (PRO)	.357
HR	Charley Jones (BSN)	9
RBI	Charley Jones (BSN) Jim O'Rourke (BSN)	62
W	John Ward (PRO)	47
ERA	Tommy Bond (BSN)	1.96
K	John Ward (PRO)	239

== National League final standings ==
National League
Team	W	L	Pct.	GB	Home	Road
Providence Grays	59	25	.702	—	34‍–‍8	25‍–‍17
Boston Red Caps	54	30	.643	5	29‍–‍13	25‍–‍17
Buffalo Bisons	46	32	.590	10	23‍–‍16	23‍–‍16
Chicago White Stockings	46	33	.582	10½	29‍–‍13	17‍–‍20
Cincinnati Reds	43	37	.537	14	21‍–‍16	22‍–‍21
Cleveland Blues	27	55	.329	31	15‍–‍27	12‍–‍28
Syracuse Stars	22	48	.314	30	11‍–‍22	11‍–‍26
Troy Trojans	19	56	.253	35½	12‍–‍27	7‍–‍29

Locations of teams for the 1879 National League season
National League

== Notable seasons ==
- Tommy Bond of the Boston Red Caps finishes 2nd in the National League with 43 wins. It is the 3rd consecutive season that Bond has won 40 games, a feat that has never been matched in major league history. Bond also wins his second ERA title, finishing at 1.96, and leads the league for the third straight season in shutouts with 11.
- Will White of the Cincinnati Reds starts 75 games as a pitcher and finishes all 75 games, compiling a record of 43–31, with a 1.99 ERA and 680 innings pitched. The 75 games started is still a single season record.

== Events ==
=== January–March ===
- January 26 – The Troy Trojans learn that they have been accepted into the National League.
- February 14 – The Milwaukee Grays remaining assets are sold to satisfy their bankruptcy judgement.
- February 18 – The International League changes its name to the National Association after losing its Canadian teams.
- March 25 – The National League votes to keep admission at 50¢.

=== April–June ===
- April 1 – The Northwest League is formed and refuses to affiliate with National League or the National Association (formerly International League). The league consists of 4 teams: Davenport, Omaha, Dubuque and Rockford.
- April 4 – The Providence Grays announce the creation of a "bull pen", to be located in center field, where fans may purchase tickets for 15¢ beginning in the 5th inning. The team also installed the first backstop behind home plate, to protect fans in what had become known as the "slaughter pen" from injuries due to foul balls and wild pitches.
- May 2 – Rookie Mike Mansell of the newly formed Troy Trojans, in attempting to break up a double play, sprains the neck of star player Ross Barnes of the Cincinnati Reds. As this is not yet an accepted style of play, Mansell is censured for his actions.
- May 17 – With no available regular catchers, the Cleveland Blues (National League) give Fred Gunkle a try. Midway through the game, after 3 errors and 7 passed balls, Gunkle is mercifully moved to right field. It is the only game he will ever play in the majors.
- May 20 – After catcher Pop Snyder cuts his hand in the 8th inning, Boston Red Caps pitcher Tommy Bond is forced to ease up on his pitching. The Chicago White Stockings take advantage of the slower speed and score 4 in the 9th to beat the Red Caps 9–5.
- June 6 – Charley Jones of the Boston Red Caps, who will lead the league in home runs, hits one that is estimated to travel 500 feet in the air.
- June 14 – Silver Flint of the Chicago White Stockings hits a ball over the left field fence in the 9th inning against the Troy Trojans. Flint chooses to stop at third base for a triple so that the catcher will have to play closer to the batter, thus giving him a better hitting opportunity. Flint does score, but the White Stockings lose 10–9.
- June 20 – Oscar Walker, of the Buffalo Bisons, becomes the first major league player to strike out 5 times in a 9-inning game.
- June 21 – William Edward White plays first base for the Providence Grays in their 5–3 win over the Cleveland Blues. White is believed by some to have been the first black player to play in the major leagues.
- June 22 – The New York Times reports on the death of a player named Alexander Taylor. The article states that Taylor, while catching, set up too close to the batter as he swung and was hit in the head by the bat, smashing his skull.
- June 23 – Dan Brouthers makes his debut with the Troy Trojans.
- June 26 – Boston catcher Pop Snyder starts a triple play by dropping a third strike with the bases loaded and no outs to help the Red Caps beat the Providence Grays 3–2. The dropped third strike rule will not be implemented until 1887.

=== July–September ===
- July 4 – In a game billed as the championship of the United States, the New York Blue Stockings women's team defeat the lady Philadelphia Red Stockings 36–24 in front of 5,000 fans in Philadelphia. The carnival-like atmosphere combined with the score cause the crowd to get unruly and the game is called early.
- July 19 – The first all-lefty pitching matchup takes place in Cleveland as Bobby Mathews of the Cleveland Blues beats Curry Foley of the Boston Red Caps 8–2.
- July 26 – Syracuse Stars pitcher Harry McCormick hits a home run in the first inning against Boston Red Caps pitcher Tommy Bond and then proceeds to shut out the Red Caps 1–0. It is the only time in major league history that a pitcher has hit a first-inning home run to win a 1–0 game.
- August 15 – Cap Anson plays his final game of the season for the Chicago White Stockings. Anson will travel back home to Marshalltown, Iowa to recover from a liver ailment. Silver Flint assumes the manager duties for Chicago.
- September 7 – Dan Brouthers is released by the Troy Trojans, despite hitting .274 and ranking 3rd in the National League in home runs. Brouthers will play 3 games for Troy in 1880 before becoming a star with the Buffalo Bisons.
- September 10 – The Syracuse Stars fold due to impending bankruptcy.
- September 23 – Jim Tyng, the first player to wear a catcher's mask (in 1877), is picked up by Harry Wright and the Boston Red Caps as an emergency pitcher. Tyng defeats the first-place Providence Grays to draw the Red Caps within 2 games of the Grays. It will be the only victory of Tyng's career.
- September 26 – The Providence Grays defeat the Boston Red Caps 7–6 to clinch the National League pennant. George Wright scores the winning run for the Grays in the 9th inning to defeat his brother and opposing manager Harry Wright.
- September 30
  - Will White pitches his 75th complete game of the season for the Cincinnati Reds, and finishes the year having thrown 680 innings. Both statistics are records that will probably never be broken.
  - Word leaks out that the National League owners have secretly agreed to reserve five players per team that other clubs will not negotiate with. This agreement, which expanded and became known as baseball's reserve clause, will be the main factor in limiting player movement and controlling player salaries for nearly a century.

=== October–December ===
- October 1 – The Cincinnati Reds release all of their players and are unable to pay them their final month's salary.
- October 2 – The Troy Trojans complain that new "reserve system" has already been violated with the Chicago White Stockings signing of Troy pitcher Fred Goldsmith.
- October 16 – Mike "King" Kelly, released by the Cincinnati Reds, sign on with the Chicago White Stockings while touring with them in California.
- October 24 – The Cincinnati Reds formally withdraw from the National League.
- November 24 – Taking advantage of the new reserve rule, the Providence Grays offer reserved player-manager George Wright a 15 percent pay cut from his $2,000 salary, after he guided the Grays to the pennant. Wright refuses and, as a named reserve player, will receive no offers from any other National League club.
- December 3 – At the league meetings, the National League accepts the semi-professional Cincinnati Stars as a new franchise to fill the void left by the defunct Cincinnati Reds.
- December 4 – The National League reduces the number of balls needed for a walk down to 8. The league also institutes a rule stating that the team batting last in the inning does not need to finish their at-bat or bat at all in the final inning if they are ahead.
- December 6–18 – The American College Baseball Association is founded in Springfield, Massachusetts.

== Births ==
- January 11 – Harry McIntire
- January 12
  - Hank Olmsted
  - Gary Wilson
- January 24 – Dave Brain
- February 14 – Tim Jordan
- February 18 – Louis Leroy
- March 13 – Mal Eason
- March 25 – John Walsh
- March 27 – Miller Huggins
- April 9 – Doc White
- April 13 – Jake Stahl
- April 29 – Noodles Hahn
- May 20 – Jake Thielman
- June 1 – John Castle
- June 11 – Roger Bresnahan
- June 12 – Red Dooin
- June 20 – Jim Delahanty
- July 14 – Fred Burchell
- July 29 – Earl Moore
- July 31 – Lee Fyfe
- September 2 – Fred Payne
- September 7 – Hooks Wiltse
- September 17 – Rube Foster
- October 4 – Bob Rhoads
- October 16 – Art Devlin
- October 28 – Frank Smith
- November 22 – Bob Hart
- December 8
  - Jimmy Austin
  - Jack Thoney
- December 12 – Mike Mitchell
- December 20 – Doc Moskiman
- December 23 – Frank Owen
- December 31 – Fred Beebe

== Deaths ==
- June 18 – George Fletcher, 34, played two games for the Brooklyn Eckfords in 1872.
- August 4 – Charlie Bierman, 34?, played one game in 1871 with the Fort Wayne Kekiongas.
- October 28 – Jimmy Hallinan, 30, shortstop for several teams who batted .321 in 1877 with the Cincinnati and Chicago.
