= 1883 Baltimore Orioles season =

1883 Baltimore Orioles
- League: American Association
- Ballpark: Oriole Park
- City: Baltimore, Maryland
- Record: 28–68 (.292)
- League place: 8th
- Owner: Harry Von der Horst
- Manager: Billy Barnie

== Regular season ==
=== Season standings ===
American Association
Team	W	L	Pct.	GB	Home	Road
Philadelphia Athletics	66	32	.673	—	37‍–‍14	29‍–‍18
St. Louis Browns	65	33	.663	1	35‍–‍14	30‍–‍19
Cincinnati Red Stockings	61	37	.622	5	38‍–‍13	23‍–‍24
New York Metropolitans	54	42	.562	11	29‍–‍17	25‍–‍25
Louisville Eclipse	52	45	.536	13½	29‍–‍18	23‍–‍27
Columbus Buckeyes	32	65	.330	33½	18‍–‍29	14‍–‍36
Pittsburgh Alleghenys	31	67	.316	35	18‍–‍31	13‍–‍36
Baltimore Orioles	28	68	.292	37	18‍–‍31	10‍–‍37

=== Record vs. opponents ===
1883 American Association record Sources:
Team	BAL	CIN	COL	LOU	NYM	PHA	PIT	STL
Baltimore	—	3–11	6–7	6–8	3–10	3–11	5–9	2–12
Cincinnati	11–3	—	11–3	10–4	4–10	9–5	8–6	8–6
Columbus	7–6	3–11	—	5–9	3–11	1–13	10–4	3–11
Louisville	8–6	4–10	9–5	—	7–6–1	7–7	11–3	6–8
New York	10–3	10–4	11–3	6–7–1	—	5–9	9–5	3–11
Philadelphia	11–3	5–9	13–1	7–7	9–5	—	12–2	9–5
Pittsburgh	9–5	6–8	4–10	3–11	5–9	2–12	—	2–12
St. Louis	12–2	6–8	11–3	8–6	11–3	5–9	12–2	—

=== Roster ===
1883 Baltimore Orioles
Roster
Pitchers: Frank Diven; Bob Emslie; John Fox; Hardie Henderson; Jack Neagle; Catchers: Phil Baker; Billy Barnie; Cal Broughton; Charlie Ingraham; John Kelly; Dave Oldfield; Rooney Sweeney	Infielders: George Baker; Bill Farrell; Jack Leary; Tim Manning; Jerry McCormick; Tom O'Brien; Billy Reid; Lou Say; Nick Scharf; Dan Stearns	Outfielders: Doug Allison; Jim Clinton; Dave Eggler; Bill Gallagher; Gid Gardner; Patrick O'Loughlin; Dave Rowe	Manager: Billy Barnie

== Player stats ==
=== Batting ===
==== Starters by position ====
Note: Pos = Position; G = Games played; AB = At bats; H = Hits; Avg. = Batting average; HR = Home runs

Pos	Player	G	AB	H	Avg.	HR
C	John Kelly	48	202	46	.228	0
1B	Dan Stearns	93	382	94	.246	1
2B	Tim Manning	35	121	26	.215	0
3B	Jerry McCormick	93	389	102	.262	0
SS	Lou Say	74	324	83	.256	1
OF	Dave Eggler	53	202	38	.188	0
OF	Dave Rowe	59	256	80	.313	0
OF	Jim Clinton	94	399	125	.313	0

==== Other batters ====
Note: G = Games played; AB = At bats; H = Hits; Avg. = Batting average; HR = Home runs

Player	G	AB	H	Avg.	HR
Gid Gardner	42	161	44	.273	1
Tom O'Brien	33	138	37	.268	0
Phil Baker	28	121	33	.273	1
Rooney Sweeney	25	101	21	.208	0
Billy Reid	24	97	27	.278	0
Bill Gallagher	16	61	10	.164	0
Billy Barnie	17	55	11	.200	0
Cal Broughton	9	32	6	.188	0
George Baker	7	22	5	.227	0
Nick Scharf	3	13	2	.154	0
Jack Leary	3	11	2	.182	0
Bill Farrell	2	8	0	.000	0
Patrick O'Loughlin	1	5	2	.400	0
Charlie Ingraham	1	4	1	.250	0
Dave Oldfield	1	4	0	.000	0
Doug Allison	1	3	2	.667	0

=== Pitching ===
==== Starting pitchers ====
Note: G = Games pitched; IP = Innings pitched; W = Wins; L = Losses; ERA = Earned run average; SO = Strikeouts

Player	G	IP	W	L	ERA	SO
Hardie Henderson	45	358.1	10	32	4.02	145
Bob Emslie	24	201.1	9	13	3.17	62
John Fox	20	165.1	6	13	4.03	49
Jack Neagle	6	46.0	1	4	4.89	9
Frank Diven	2	11.0	1	1	7.36	3

==== Other pitchers ====
Note: G = Games pitched; IP = Innings pitched; W = Wins; L = Losses; ERA = Earned run average; SO = Strikeouts

Player	G	IP	W	L	ERA	SO
Bill Gallagher	7	51.2	0	5	5.40	19

==== Relief pitchers ====
Note: G = Games pitched; W = Wins; L = Losses; SV = Saves; ERA = Earned run average; SO = Strikeouts

Player	G	W	L	SV	ERA	SO
Gid Gardner	2	1	0	0	5.14	2
Dave Rowe	1	0	0	0	20.25	1
