= List of Pittsburgh Pirates managers =

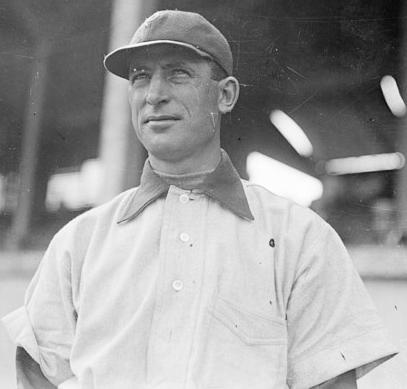
Fred Clarke, the winningest manager in Pirates history; he led the team to 1,422 victories along with a World Series title and four National League pennants.

The Pittsburgh Pirates are a Major League Baseball (MLB) franchise based in Pittsburgh, Pennsylvania. They play in the National League Central division. The team began play in 1882 as the Alleghenies (alternatively spelled "Alleghenys") in the American Association. The franchise moved to the National League after owner William Nimick became upset over a contract dispute, thus beginning the modern day franchise. The team currently plays home games at PNC Park which they moved into in 2001. Prior to PNC Park, the Pirates played games at Three Rivers Stadium and Forbes Field, among other stadiums.

There have been 47 managers for the Pittsburgh Pirates franchise. The Pirates' first manager upon joining the National League was Horace Phillips, who had coached the team before their move to the National League. In 1900, Fred Clarke began his tenure with the franchise. Clarke's 1422 victories and 969 losses lead all managers of the Pirates in their respective categories, Clarke also had the longest tenure as manager in his 16 years in the position. Clarke managed the franchise to its first World Series victory, a feat that would also be accomplished by Bill McKechnie, Danny Murtaugh, and Chuck Tanner. Thirteen Pirates managers have been player-managers—those who take on simultaneous roles as a player and manager. McKechnie, Connie Mack, and Ned Hanlon were inducted into the National Baseball Hall of Fame and Museum as managers. Five Pirates managers were inducted into the Hall of Fame for their performance as players. Billy Meyer's number 1, Pie Traynor's number 20, Honus Wagner's number 33, and Murtaugh's number 40 have been retired by the franchise. The Pirates' current manager is Don Kelly, who replaced Derek Shelton.

== Table key ==
Years	Seasons managed; each is linked to an article about that particular season
WPct	Winning percentage: number of wins divided by number of games managed
PA	Playoff appearances: number of years this manager has led the franchise to the playoffs
PW	Playoff wins: number of wins this manager has accrued in the playoffs
PL	Playoff losses: number of losses this manager has accrued in the playoffs
Div	Division titles: number of division titles won by the general manager
Pen	Pennants: number of pennants (league championships) won by the manager
WS	World Series: number of World Series victories achieved by the manager
† or *	Inducted into the National Baseball Hall of Fame and Museum († denotes induction as manager)

== American Association ==
#	Manager	Years	Wins	Losses	WPct	Ref
1	Al Pratt	1882–1883	51	59	.464	
2	Ormond Butler	1883	17	36	.321	
3	Joe Battin	1883, 1884	8	18	.308	
4	Denny McKnight	1884	4	8	.333	
5	Bob Ferguson	1884	11	31	.262	
6	George Creamer	1884	0	8	.000	
7	Horace Phillips	1885–1886	145	136	.516	

== National League ==
#	Manager	Years	Wins	Losses	WPct	PA	PW	PL	Pen	WS	Ref
1	Horace Phillips	1887–1889^{[a]}	149	180	.453	—	—	—	—	—	
2	Fred Dunlap	1889	7	10	.412	—	—	—	—	—	
3	Ned Hanlon†	1889, 1891^{[b]}	57	65	.467	—	—	—	—	—	
4	Guy Hecker	1890	23	113	.169	—	—	—	—	—	
5	Bill McGunnigle	1891	24	33	.421	—	—	—	—	—	
6	Tom Burns	1892	27	32	.458	—	—	—	—	—	
7	Al Buckenberger	1892–1894	187	144	.565	—	—	—	—	—	
8	Connie Mack†	1894–1896	149	134	.527	—	—	—	—	—	
9	Patsy Donovan	1897, 1899^{[c]}	129	129	.500	—	—	—	—	—	
10	Bill Watkins	1898–1899	79	91	.465	—	—	—	—	—	
11	Fred Clarke*	1900–1915	1422	969	.595	4	7	8	4	1	
12	Nixey Callahan	1916–1917	85	129	.397	—	—	—	—	—	
13	Honus Wagner*	1917	1	4	.200	—	—	—	—	—	
14	Hugo Bezdek	1917–1919	166	187	.470	—	—	—	—	—	
15	George Gibson	1920–1922, 1932–1934^{[d]}	401	330	.549	—	—	—	—	—	
16	Bill McKechnie†	1922–1926	409	293	.583	1	4	3	1	1	
17	Donie Bush	1927–1929	246	178	.580	1	0	4	1	0	
18	Jewel Ens	1929–1931	176	167	.513	—	—	—	—	—	
19	Pie Traynor*	1934–1939	457	406	.530	—	—	—	—	—	
20	Frankie Frisch*	1940–1946	539	528	.505	—	—	—	—	—	
21	Spud Davis	1946	1	2	.333	—	—	—	—	—	
22	Billy Herman*	1947	61	92	.399	—	—	—	—	—	
23	Bill Burwell	1947	1	0	1.000	—	—	—	—	—	
24	Billy Meyer	1948–1952	317	452	.412	—	—	—	—	—	
25	Fred Haney	1953–1955	163	299	.353	—	—	—	—	—	
26	Bobby Bragan	1956–1957	102	155	.397	—	—	—	—	—	
27	Danny Murtaugh	1957–1964, 1967, 1970–1971, 1973–1976^{[e]}	1115	950	.540	5	15	13	2	2	
28	Harry Walker	1965–1967	224	184	.549	—	—	—	—	—	
29	Larry Shepard	1968–1969	164	155	.514	—	—	—	—	—	
30	Alex Grammas	1969	4	1	.800	—	—	—	—	—	
31	Bill Virdon	1972–1973	163	128	.560	1	2	3	0	0	
32	Chuck Tanner	1977–1985	711	685	.509	1	7	3	1	1	
33	Jim Leyland	1986–1996	851	863	.496	3	8	12	0	0	
34	Gene Lamont	1997–2000	295	352	.456	—	—	—	—	—	
35	Lloyd McClendon	2001–2005	336	446	.430	—	—	—	—	—	
36	Pete Mackanin	2005	12	14	.462	—	—	—	—	—	
37	Jim Tracy	2006–2007	135	189	.417	—	—	—	—	—	
38	John Russell	2008–2010	186	299	.384	—	—	—	—	—	
39	Clint Hurdle	2011–2019	735	720	.505	3	3	5	0	0	
40	Derek Shelton	2020–2025	306	440	.410	—	—	—	—	—	
41	Don Kelly	2025–present	141	145	.493	—	—	—			

== Footnotes ==
- a The Alleghenies began the 1889 season with a record of 28–43; manager Horace Phillips suffered a mental breakdown and was replaced by Fred Dunlap who coached the team to a 7–10 record over the next 17 games. Ned Hanlon, the team's center fielder, was brought in to finish the season as manager, leading the team to a winning record of 26–18.
- b Hanlon left the team to join the Players' League in 1890, but returned after the League disbanded after one season. Upon his return Hanlon replaced Guy Hecker. After disagreements with management, however, Hanlon was demoted as manager with a 31–47 record in his second stint as manager. Bill McGunnigle finished the 1891 season as manager.
- c Patsy Donovan managed the team to a 60–71 record in 1897, finishing in eighth place. He was replaced by Bill Watkins who managed the team for over one season, but after a 7–15 start to the 1899 campaign Donovan resumed his position as manager and finished his second stint with a 69–58 record.
- d George Gibson coached 374 games from 1920 to 1922, winning 201 and losing 173. He coached 359 games from 1932 to 1934, winning 200 and losing 159.
- e Bobby Bragan coached the Pirates to a 36–67 record in 1957, before being replaced by Danny Murtaugh. Murtaugh coached the team for eight seasons during his first stint, coaching 1154 games for 605 wins and 549 losses. Harry Walker took over for Murtaugh, until a 42–42 start in 1967 caused management to bring back Murtaugh to finish the season as manager. Murtaugh went 39–39 to conclude the 1967 campaign. Murtaugh's third stint as Pirates manager lasted two seasons, he was 186–138 overall, winning a World Series in the second season. Bill Virdon was the Pirates for one season, but after beginning his second 67–69, Murtaugh was brought in for his fourth term as manager. Murtaugh finished his final term with a 285–226 record.

== Image gallery ==
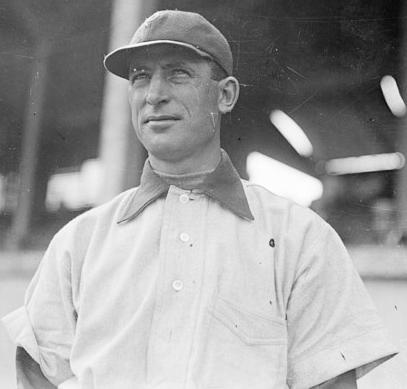
Fred Clarke had 1,422 wins in 2,424 games, each of which are franchise records; he led them to four National League pennants (1901, 1902, 1903), and the World Series championship in 1909.

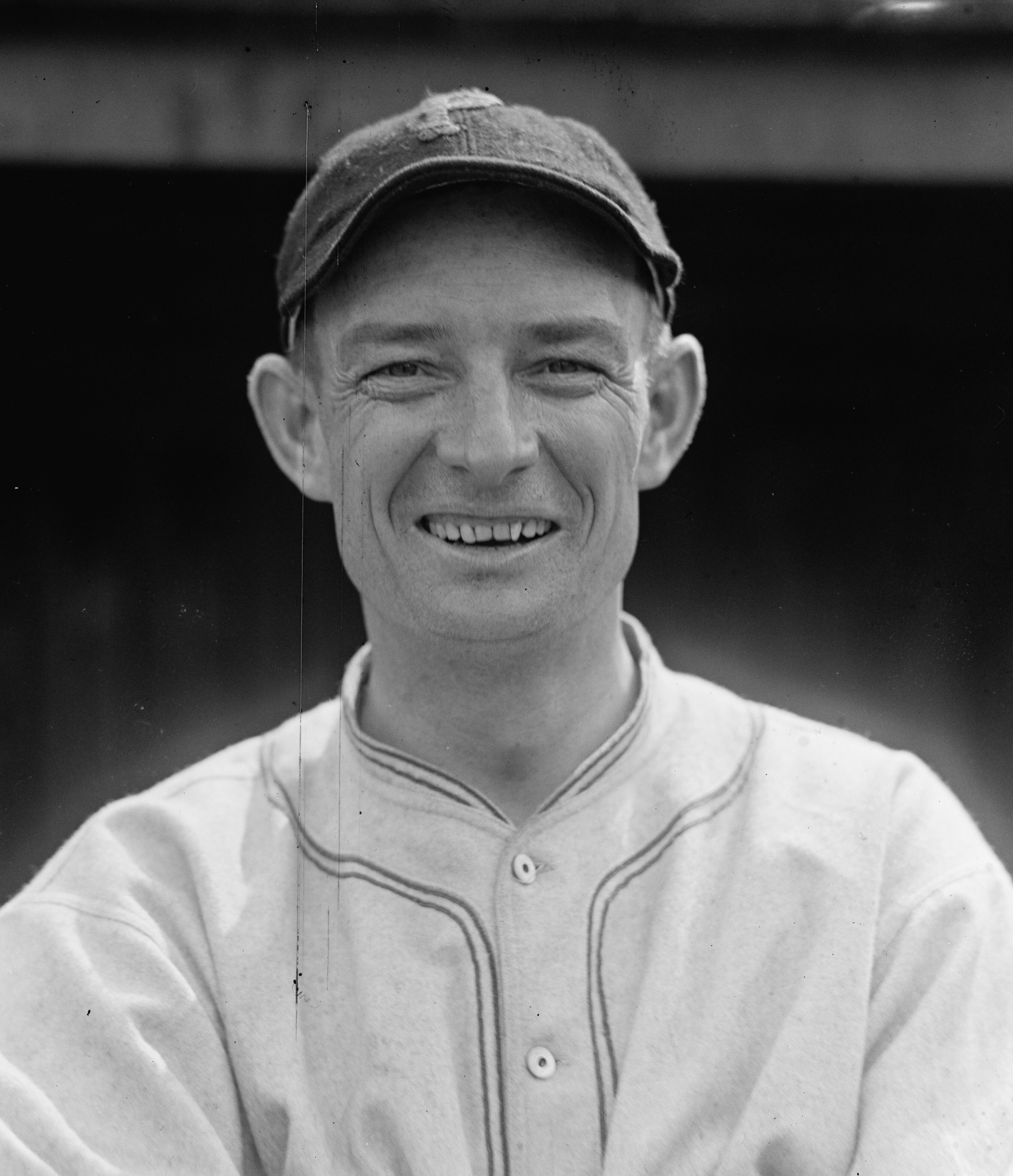
Bill McKechnie led the Pirates to the 1925 world championship.

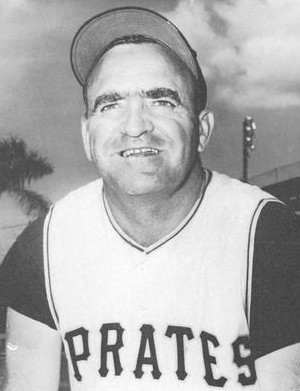
Danny Murtaugh led the Pirates to World Series championships in 1960 and 1971 as one of two Pirate managers to win 1,000 games.

Chuck Tanner led the Pirates to the 1979 World Series title, currently the last championship in franchise history

Jim Leyland led the Pirates to consecutive NL East titles in 1990, 1991, and 1992, still the last division championships in franchise history.

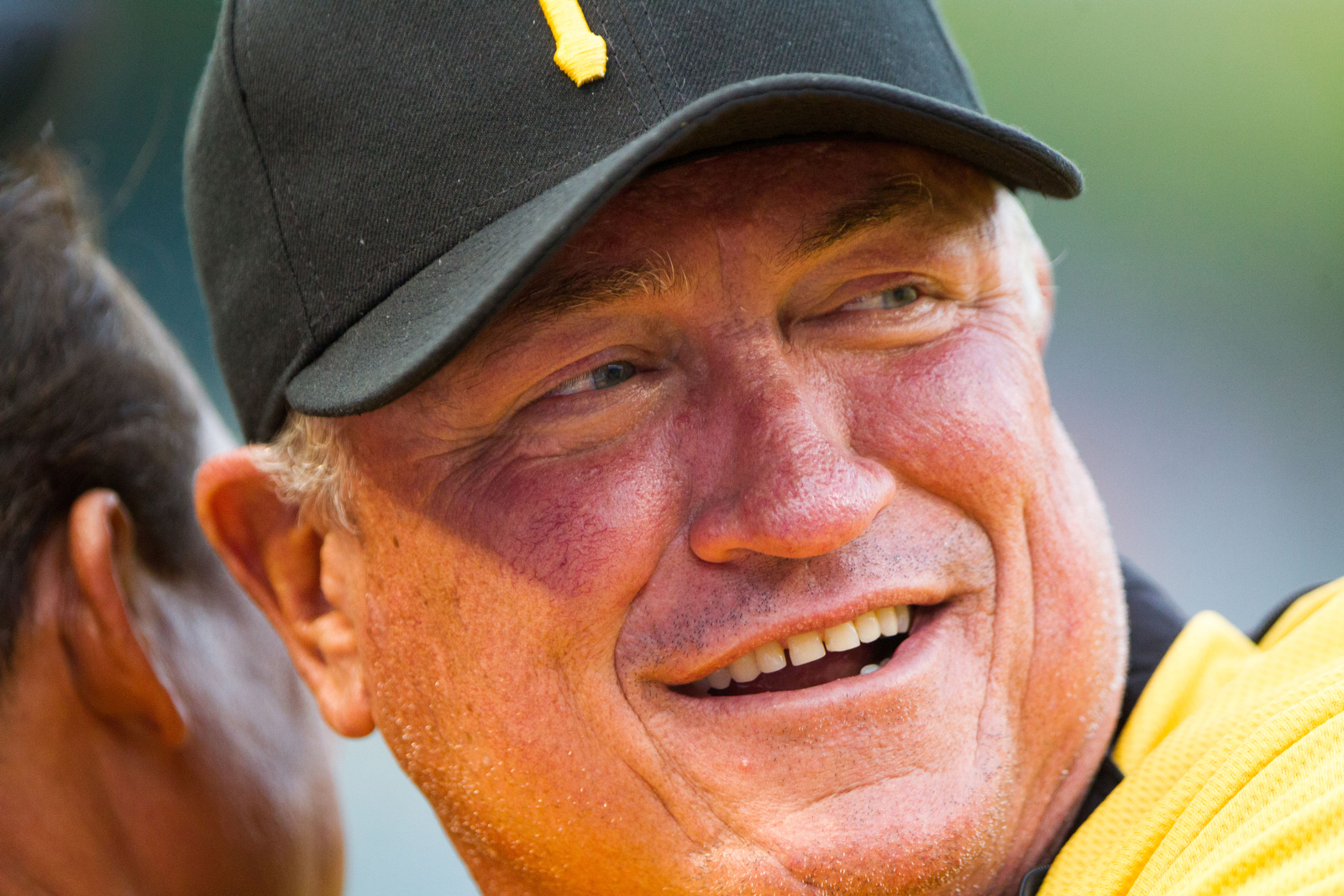
Clint Hurdle served as the manager of the Pirates from 2011 until 2019.
