= 1883 Pittsburgh Alleghenys season =

1883 Pittsburgh Alleghenys
- League: American Association
- Ballpark: Exposition Park II
- City: Allegheny, Pennsylvania
- Record: 31–67 (.316)
- League place: 7th
- Owner: Denny McKnight
- Managers: Al Pratt, Ormond Butler, Joe Battin

The 1883 Pittsburgh Alleghenys season was the second season of the Pittsburgh Alleghenys franchise. The Alleghenys finished seventh in the American Association with a record of 31–67.

== Game log ==
1883 game log
May: 7–13 (Home: 3–8; Away: 4–5)

#	Date	Opponent	Score	Record
1	Tuesday, May 1	Philadelphia Athletics	0–4	0–1
2	Wednesday, May 2	Philadelphia Athletics	1–8	0–2
3	Monday, May 7	New York Metropolitans	5–8	0–3
4	Tuesday, May 8	New York Metropolitans	7–10	0–4
5	Wednesday, May 9	New York Metropolitans	18–3	1–4
6	Thursday, May 10	Baltimore Orioles	3–4	1–5
7	Friday, May 11	Baltimore Orioles	7–6	2–5
8	Saturday, May 12	Baltimore Orioles	3–6	2–6
9	Tuesday, May 15	@ New York Metropolitans	2–6	2–7
10	Wednesday, May 16	@ New York Metropolitans	3–2	3–7
11	Thursday, May 17	@ New York Metropolitans	3–7	3–8
12	Saturday, May 19	@ Philadelphia Athletics	8–11	3–9
13	Monday, May 21	@ Philadelphia Athletics	1–4	3–10
14	Tuesday, May 22	@ Philadelphia Athletics	1–9	3–11
15	Thursday, May 24	@ Baltimore Orioles	16–4	4–11
16	Friday, May 25	@ Baltimore Orioles	15–6	5–11
17	Saturday, May 26	@ Baltimore Orioles	7–5	6–11
18	Tuesday, May 29	St. Louis Browns	5–10	6–12
19	Wednesday, May 30	St. Louis Browns	2–4	6–13
20	Wednesday, May 30	St. Louis Browns	10–4	7–13

June: 7–11 (Home: 3–6; Away: 4–5)

#	Date	Opponent	Score	Record
21	Saturday, Jun 2	Cincinnati Red Stockings	10–9	8–13
22	Monday, Jun 4	Cincinnati Red Stockings	8–12	8–14
23	Tuesday, Jun 5	Cincinnati Red Stockings	2–3	8–15
24	Thursday, Jun 7	Louisville Eclipse	10–0	9–15
25	Friday, Jun 8	Louisville Eclipse	18–6	10–15
26	Saturday, Jun 9	Louisville Eclipse	1–3	10–16
27	Tuesday, Jun 12	Columbus Buckeyes	5–6	10–17
28	Thursday, Jun 14	Columbus Buckeyes	10–23	10–18
29	Friday, Jun 15	Columbus Buckeyes	8–11	10–19
30	Monday, Jun 18	@ Columbus Buckeyes	5–4	11–19
31	Tuesday, Jun 19	@ Columbus Buckeyes	2–5	11–20
32	Wednesday, Jun 20	@ Columbus Buckeyes	11–4	12–20
33	Friday, Jun 22	@ Columbus Buckeyes	8–10	12–21
34	Saturday, Jun 23	@ Cincinnati Red Stockings	2–7	12–22
35	Monday, Jun 25	@ Cincinnati Red Stockings	2–1	13–22
36	Tuesday, Jun 26	@ Cincinnati Red Stockings	4–1	14–22
37	Thursday, Jun 28	@ Louisville Eclipse	4–9	14–23
38	Saturday, Jun 30	@ Louisville Eclipse	7–8	14–24

July: 6–16 (Home: 4–5; Away: 2–11)

#	Date	Opponent	Score	Record
39	Sunday, Jul 1	@ Louisville Eclipse	0–14	14–25
40	Monday, Jul 2	@ Louisville Eclipse	4–10	14–26
41	Wednesday, Jul 4	@ St. Louis Browns	2–8	14–27
42	Wednesday, Jul 4	@ St. Louis Browns	2–3	14–28
43	Friday, Jul 6	@ St. Louis Browns	1–4	14–29
44	Sunday, Jul 8	@ St. Louis Browns	2–5	14–30
45	Tuesday, Jul 10	Philadelphia Athletics	11–4	15–30
46	Wednesday, Jul 11	Philadelphia Athletics	3–12	15–31
47	Thursday, Jul 12	Philadelphia Athletics	9–1	16–31
48	Friday, Jul 13	Philadelphia Athletics	1–4	16–32
49	Saturday, Jul 14	Philadelphia Athletics	2–3	16–33
50	Tuesday, Jul 17	New York Metropolitans	7–6	17–33
51	Wednesday, Jul 18	New York Metropolitans	1–9	17–34
52	Thursday, Jul 19	New York Metropolitans	6–1	18–34
53	Friday, Jul 20	New York Metropolitans	9–10	18–35
54	Monday, Jul 23	@ Baltimore Orioles	12–4	19–35
55	Wednesday, Jul 25	@ Baltimore Orioles	9–13	19–36
56	Thursday, Jul 26	@ Baltimore Orioles	11–8	20–36
57	Friday, Jul 27	@ Baltimore Orioles	8–21	20–37
58	Saturday, Jul 28	@ Philadelphia Athletics	2–11	20–38
59	Monday, Jul 30	@ Philadelphia Athletics	4–17	20–39
60	Tuesday, Jul 31	@ Philadelphia Athletics	12–16	20–40

August: 6–15 (Home: 5–11; Away: 1–4)

#	Date	Opponent	Score	Record
61	Wednesday, Aug 1	@ Philadelphia Athletics	2–19	20–41
62	Friday, Aug 3	@ New York Metropolitans	4–3	21–41
63	Saturday, Aug 4	@ New York Metropolitans	6–7	21–42
64	Monday, Aug 6	@ New York Metropolitans	3–7	21–43
65	Tuesday, Aug 7	@ New York Metropolitans	1–16	21–44
66	Thursday, Aug 9	Baltimore Orioles	4–2	22–44
67	Friday, Aug 10	Baltimore Orioles	5–4	23–44
68	Saturday, Aug 11	Baltimore Orioles	6–4	24–44
69	Monday, Aug 13	Baltimore Orioles	3–11	24–45
70	Thursday, Aug 16	Louisville Eclipse	1–5	24–46
71	Friday, Aug 17	Louisville Eclipse	9–11	24–47
72	Saturday, Aug 18	Louisville Eclipse	1–7	24–48
73	Monday, Aug 20	Louisville Eclipse	2–8	24–49
74	Wednesday, Aug 22	St. Louis Browns	3–6	24–50
75	Thursday, Aug 23	St. Louis Browns	7–10	24–51
76	Friday, Aug 24	St. Louis Browns	4–15	24–52
77	Saturday, Aug 25	St. Louis Browns	7–3	25–52
78	Tuesday, Aug 28	Columbus Buckeyes	0–4	25–53
79	Wednesday, Aug 29	Columbus Buckeyes	6–10	25–54
80	Thursday, Aug 30	Columbus Buckeyes	14–4	26–54
81	Friday, Aug 31	Columbus Buckeyes	0–2	26–55

September: 5–12 (Home: 3–1; Away: 2–11)

#	Date	Opponent	Score	Record
82	Monday, Sep 3	Cincinnati Red Stockings	4–3	27–55
83	Tuesday, Sep 4	Cincinnati Red Stockings	7–9	27–56
84	Wednesday, Sep 5	Cincinnati Red Stockings	15–9	28–56
85	Thursday, Sep 6	Cincinnati Red Stockings	12–4	29–56
86	Monday, Sep 10	@ Cincinnati Red Stockings	6–12	29–57
87	Tuesday, Sep 11	@ Cincinnati Red Stockings	2–7	29–58
88	Wednesday, Sep 12	@ Cincinnati Red Stockings	5–27	29–59
89	Thursday, Sep 13	@ Cincinnati Red Stockings	2–8	29–60
90	Saturday, Sep 15	@ Columbus Buckeyes	7–3	30–60
91	Sunday, Sep 16	@ Columbus Buckeyes	1–5	30–61
92	Wednesday, Sep 19	@ Columbus Buckeyes	3–8	30–62
93	Friday, Sep 21	@ Louisville Eclipse	7–5	31–62
94	Saturday, Sep 22	@ Louisville Eclipse	4–5	31–63
95	Sunday, Sep 23	@ Louisville Eclipse	0–4	31–64
96	Wednesday, Sep 26	@ St. Louis Browns	3–20	31–65
97	Thursday, Sep 27	@ St. Louis Browns	2–6	31–66
98	Sunday, Sep 30	@ St. Louis Browns	3–6	31–67

Legend: = Win = Loss

== Season standings ==
American Association
Team	W	L	Pct.	GB	Home	Road
Philadelphia Athletics	66	32	.673	—	37‍–‍14	29‍–‍18
St. Louis Browns	65	33	.663	1	35‍–‍14	30‍–‍19
Cincinnati Red Stockings	61	37	.622	5	38‍–‍13	23‍–‍24
New York Metropolitans	54	42	.562	11	29‍–‍17	25‍–‍25
Louisville Eclipse	52	45	.536	13½	29‍–‍18	23‍–‍27
Columbus Buckeyes	32	65	.330	33½	18‍–‍29	14‍–‍36
Pittsburgh Alleghenys	31	67	.316	35	18‍–‍31	13‍–‍36
Baltimore Orioles	28	68	.292	37	18‍–‍31	10‍–‍37

=== Record vs. opponents ===
1883 American Association record Sources:
Team	BAL	CIN	COL	LOU	NYM	PHA	PIT	STL
Baltimore	—	3–11	6–7	6–8	3–10	3–11	5–9	2–12
Cincinnati	11–3	—	11–3	10–4	4–10	9–5	8–6	8–6
Columbus	7–6	3–11	—	5–9	3–11	1–13	10–4	3–11
Louisville	8–6	4–10	9–5	—	7–6–1	7–7	11–3	6–8
New York	10–3	10–4	11–3	6–7–1	—	5–9	9–5	3–11
Philadelphia	11–3	5–9	13–1	7–7	9–5	—	12–2	9–5
Pittsburgh	9–5	6–8	4–10	3–11	5–9	2–12	—	2–12
St. Louis	12–2	6–8	11–3	8–6	11–3	5–9	12–2	—

== Roster ==
1883 Pittsburgh Alleghenys roster
Pitchers: Norm Baker; Bob Barr; Denny Driscoll; Jack Neagle; Ed "The Only" Nolan; Catchers: Wes Blogg; Jackie Hayes	Infielders: Joe Battin; George Creamer; Denny Mack; Frank McLaughlin; Bill Morgan; Henry Oberbeck; John Peters; Ed Swartwood	Outfielders: Buttercup Dickerson; Mike Mansell; Billy Taylor; Manager: Joe Battin; Ormond Butler; Al Pratt

== Player stats ==
Batters

Note: G = Games played; AB = At bats; H = Hits; Avg. = Batting average; HR = Home runs; RBI = Runs batted in

Regular season
Player	G	AB	H	Avg.	HR	RBI
E. Swartwood	94	412	147	0.357	3	—
E. Nolan	7	26	8	0.308	0	—
J. Hayes	85	351	92	0.262	3	—
B. Taylor	83	369	96	0.260	2	—
M. Mansell	96	412	106	0.257	3	—
G. Creamer	91	369	94	0.255	0	—
B. Dickerson	85	354	88	0.249	0	—
B. Barr	37	142	35	0.246	0	—
H. Oberbeck	2	9	2	0.222	0	—
F. McLaughlin	29	114	25	0.219	1	—
J. Battin	98	388	83	0.214	1	—
D. Mack	60	224	44	0.196	0	—
J. Neagle	27	101	19	0.188	0	—
D. Driscoll	41	148	27	0.182	0	—
B. Morgan	32	114	18	0.158	0	—
W. Blogg	9	34	5	0.147	0	—
J. Peters	8	28	3	0.107	0	—
N. Baker	4	12	0	0.000	0	—

Pitchers

Note: G = Games pitched; IP = Innings pitched; W = Wins; L = Losses; ERA = Earned run average; SO = Strikeouts

Regular season
Player	G	IP	W	L	ERA	SO
J. Battin	2	4	0	0	2.25	0
N. Baker	3	19	0	2	3.32	5
D. Driscoll	41	336 1/3	18	21	3.99	79
E. Nolan	7	55	0	7	4.25	23
B. Barr	26	203 1/3	6	18	4.38	81
B. Taylor	19	127	4	7	5.39	41
J. Neagle	16	114	3	12	5.84	41
F. McLaughlin	2	9	0	0	13.00	1
