= 1883 Columbus Buckeyes season =

1883 Columbus Buckeyes
- League: American Association
- Ballpark: Recreation Park
- City: Columbus, Ohio
- Record: 32–65 (.330)
- League place: 6th
- Manager: Horace Phillips

The 1883 Columbus Buckeyes finished with a 32–65 record, sixth place in the American Association. This was the first season in the major leagues for the team.

== Regular season ==
=== Season standings ===
American Association
| Team | W | L | Pct. | GB | Home | Road |
|---|---|---|---|---|---|---|
| Philadelphia Athletics | 66 | 32 | .673 | — | 37‍–‍14 | 29‍–‍18 |
| St. Louis Browns | 65 | 33 | .663 | 1 | 35‍–‍14 | 30‍–‍19 |
| Cincinnati Red Stockings | 61 | 37 | .622 | 5 | 38‍–‍13 | 23‍–‍24 |
| New York Metropolitans | 54 | 42 | .562 | 11 | 29‍–‍17 | 25‍–‍25 |
| Louisville Eclipse | 52 | 45 | .536 | 13½ | 29‍–‍18 | 23‍–‍27 |
| Columbus Buckeyes | 32 | 65 | .330 | 33½ | 18‍–‍29 | 14‍–‍36 |
| Pittsburgh Alleghenys | 31 | 67 | .316 | 35 | 18‍–‍31 | 13‍–‍36 |
| Baltimore Orioles | 28 | 68 | .292 | 37 | 18‍–‍31 | 10‍–‍37 |

=== Record vs. opponents ===
1883 American Association record Sources:
| Team | BAL | CIN | CLB | LOU | NY | PHI | PIT | STL |
|---|---|---|---|---|---|---|---|---|
| Baltimore | — | 3–11 | 6–7 | 6–8 | 3–10 | 3–11 | 5–9 | 2–12 |
| Cincinnati | 11–3 | — | 11–3 | 10–4 | 4–10 | 9–5 | 8–6 | 8–6 |
| Columbus | 7–6 | 3–11 | — | 5–9 | 3–11 | 1–13 | 10–4 | 3–11 |
| Louisville | 8–6 | 4–10 | 9–5 | — | 7–6–1 | 7–7 | 11–3 | 6–8 |
| New York | 10–3 | 10–4 | 11–3 | 6–7–1 | — | 5–9 | 9–5 | 3–11 |
| Philadelphia | 11–3 | 5–9 | 13–1 | 7–7 | 9–5 | — | 12–2 | 9–5 |
| Pittsburgh | 9–5 | 6–8 | 4–10 | 3–11 | 5–9 | 2–12 | — | 2–12 |
| St. Louis | 12–2 | 6–8 | 11–3 | 8–6 | 11–3 | 5–9 | 12–2 | — |

=== Roster ===
1883 Columbus Buckeyes
Roster
| Pitchers: Ed Dundon; Pete Fries; Frank McIntyre; Frank Mountain; John Valentine | Catchers: Rudy Kemmler; Joe Straub; Infielders: Sam Childs; Jim Field; Bill Kuehne; Gracie Pierce; John Richmond; Bill Schwartz; Pop Smith | Outfielders: Tom Brown; Fred Mann; Harry Wheeler | Manager: Horace Phillips |

== Player stats ==
=== Batting ===
==== Starters by position ====
Note: Pos = Position; G = Games played; AB = At bats; H = Hits; Avg. = Batting average; HR = Home runs

| Pos | Player | G | AB | H | Avg. | HR |
|---|---|---|---|---|---|---|
| C | Rudy Kemmler | 84 | 318 | 66 | .208 | 0 |
| 1B | Jim Field | 76 | 292 | 75 | .257 | 1 |
| 2B | Pop Smith | 97 | 405 | 106 | .262 | 4 |
| 3B | Bill Kuehne | 95 | 374 | 85 | .227 | 1 |
| SS | John Richmond | 92 | 385 | 109 | .283 | 0 |
| OF | Fred Mann | 96 | 394 | 98 | .249 | 1 |
| OF | Tom Brown | 97 | 420 | 115 | .274 | 5 |
| OF | Harry Wheeler | 82 | 371 | 84 | .226 | 0 |

==== Other batters ====
Note: G = Games played; AB = At bats; H = Hits; Avg. = Batting average; HR = Home runs

| Player | G | AB | H | Avg. | HR |
|---|---|---|---|---|---|
| Joe Straub | 27 | 100 | 13 | .130 | 0 |
| Gracie Pierce | 11 | 41 | 7 | .171 | 0 |
| Bill Schwartz | 2 | 4 | 1 | .250 | 0 |
| Sam Childs | 1 | 3 | 0 | .000 | 0 |

=== Pitching ===
==== Starting pitchers ====
Note: G = Games pitched; IP = Innings pitched; W = Wins; L = Losses; ERA = Earned run average; SO = Strikeouts

| Player | G | IP | W | L | ERA | SO |
|---|---|---|---|---|---|---|
| Frank Mountain | 59 | 503.0 | 26 | 33 | 3.60 | 159 |
| Ed Dundon | 20 | 166.2 | 3 | 16 | 4.48 | 31 |
| John Valentine | 13 | 102.0 | 2 | 10 | 3.53 | 13 |
| Pete Fries | 3 | 25.0 | 0 | 3 | 6.48 | 7 |
| Frank McIntyre | 2 | 19.0 | 1 | 1 | 5.21 | 6 |
| Harry Wheeler | 1 | 5.0 | 0 | 1 | 7.20 | 2 |

==== Other pitchers ====
Note: G = Games pitched; IP = Innings pitched; W = Wins; L = Losses; ERA = Earned run average; SO = Strikeouts

| Player | G | IP | W | L | ERA | SO |
|---|---|---|---|---|---|---|
| Tom Brown | 3 | 14.0 | 0 | 1 | 5.79 | 6 |

==== Relief pitchers ====
Note: G = Games pitched; W = Wins; L = Losses; SV = Saves; ERA = Earned run average; SO = Strikeouts

| Player | G | W | L | SV | ERA | SO |
|---|---|---|---|---|---|---|
| Pop Smith | 3 | 0 | 0 | 0 | 6.35 | 0 |
