= 1883 St. Louis Browns season =

Major League Baseball season

1883 St. Louis Browns
- League: American Association
- Ballpark: Sportsman's Park
- City: St. Louis, Missouri
- Record: 65–33 (.663)
- League place: 2nd
- Owners: Chris von der Ahe
- Managers: Ted Sullivan (53–26); Charlie Comiskey (12–7)
- Stats: ESPN.com; Baseball Reference

The 1883 St. Louis Browns season was the team's second season in St. Louis, Missouri and its second season in the American Association. The Browns went 65–33 during the season and finished second in the American Association.

== Regular season ==
=== Season standings ===
American Association
Team	W	L	Pct.	GB	Home	Road
Philadelphia Athletics	66	32	.673	—	37‍–‍14	29‍–‍18
St. Louis Browns	65	33	.663	1	35‍–‍14	30‍–‍19
Cincinnati Red Stockings	61	37	.622	5	38‍–‍13	23‍–‍24
New York Metropolitans	54	42	.562	11	29‍–‍17	25‍–‍25
Louisville Eclipse	52	45	.536	13½	29‍–‍18	23‍–‍27
Columbus Buckeyes	32	65	.330	33½	18‍–‍29	14‍–‍36
Pittsburgh Alleghenys	31	67	.316	35	18‍–‍31	13‍–‍36
Baltimore Orioles	28	68	.292	37	18‍–‍31	10‍–‍37

=== Record vs. opponents ===
1883 American Association record Sources:
Team	BAL	CIN	COL	LOU	NYM	PHA	PIT	STL
Baltimore	—	3–11	6–7	6–8	3–10	3–11	5–9	2–12
Cincinnati	11–3	—	11–3	10–4	4–10	9–5	8–6	8–6
Columbus	7–6	3–11	—	5–9	3–11	1–13	10–4	3–11
Louisville	8–6	4–10	9–5	—	7–6–1	7–7	11–3	6–8
New York	10–3	10–4	11–3	6–7–1	—	5–9	9–5	3–11
Philadelphia	11–3	5–9	13–1	7–7	9–5	—	12–2	9–5
Pittsburgh	9–5	6–8	4–10	3–11	5–9	2–12	—	2–12
St. Louis	12–2	6–8	11–3	8–6	11–3	5–9	12–2	—

=== Roster ===
1883 St. Louis Browns
Roster
Pitchers: Charlie Hodnett; Jumbo McGinnis; Tony Mullane	Catchers: Pat Deasley; Tom Dolan; Sleeper Sullivan; Infielders: Charles Comiskey; Bill Gleason; Arlie Latham; Joe Quest; George Strief	Outfielders: Ned Cuthbert; John Ewing; Jack Gleason; Jack Gorman; Fred Lewis; Tom Loftus; Tom Mansell; Harry McCaffery; Hugh Nicol; Henry Oberbeck	Manager: Charles Comiskey; Ted Sullivan

== Player stats ==
=== Batting ===
==== Starters by position ====
Pos=Position, G=Games played, AB=At bats, R=Runs scored, H=Hits, 2B=Doubles, 3B=Triples, Avg=Batting average, HR=Home runs, RBI=Runs batted in, BB=Base on balls, Slg=Slugging percentage

Pos	Player	G	AB	R	H	2B	3B	Avg.	HR	RBI	BB	Slg
C	Pat Deasley	58	206	27	53	2	1	.257	0	15	6	.277
1B	Charles Comiskey	96	401	87	118	17	9	.294	2	64	11	.397
2B	George Strief	82	302	22	68	9	0	.225	1	22	12	.265
3B	Arlie Latham	98	406	86	96	12	7	.236	0	?	18	.300
SS	Bill Gleason	98	425	81	122	21	9	.287	2	42	15	.393
OF	Hugh Nicol	94	368	73	105	13	3	.285	0	39	18	.337
OF	Fred Lewis	49	209	37	63	8	4	.301	1	33	1	.392
OF	Tom Dolan	81	295	32	63	9	2	.214	1	18	9	.268

==== Other batters ====
G=Games played, AB=At bats, R=Runs scored, H=Hits, 2B=Doubles, 3B=Triples, Avg.=Batting average, HR=Home runs, RBI=Runs batted in, BB=Base on balls, Slg=Slugging percentage

Player	G	AB	R	H	2B	3B	Avg.	HR	RBI	BB	Slg
Tom Mansell	28	112	23	45	8	1	.402	0	24	7	.491
Joe Quest	19	78	12	20	3	1	.256	0	10	1	.321
Ned Cuthbert	21	71	3	12	1	0	.169	0	3	4	.183
Jack Gleason	9	34	2	8	0	0	.235	0	0	4	.235
Sleeper Sullivan	8	27	2	6	0	1	.222	0	0	0	.296
Tom Loftus	6	22	1	4	0	0	.182	0	0	2	.182
Harry McCaffery	5	18	0	1	0	0	.056	0	1	1	.056
Henry Oberbeck	4	14	0	0	0	0	.000	0	0	0	.000
John Ewing	1	5	0	0	0	0	.000	0	0	0	.000
Jack Gorman	1	4	0	0	0	0	.000	0	0	0	.000

=== Pitching ===
==== Starting pitchers ====
Note: G = Games pitched; IP = Innings pitched; W = Wins; L = Losses; ERA = Earned run average; SO = Strikeouts

Player	G	IP	W	L	ERA	SO
Tony Mullane	53	460.2	35	15	2.19	191
Jumbo McGinnis	45	382.2	28	16	2.33	128
Charlie Hodnett	4	32.0	2	2	1.41	6

==== Relief pitchers ====
Note: G = Games pitched; W = Wins; L = Losses; SV = Saves; ERA = Earned run average; SO = Strikeouts

Player	G	W	L	SV	ERA	SO
Tom Dolan	1	0	0	0	4.50	0
