= 1883 Louisville Eclipse season =

1883 Louisville Eclipse
- League: American Association
- Ballpark: Eclipse Park
- City: Louisville, Kentucky
- Record: 52–45 (.536)
- League place: 5th
- Owners: W. L. Lyons, Zach Phelps, W. L. Jackson, John Phelps
- Manager: Joe Gerhardt

The 1883 Louisville Eclipse season was a season in American baseball. The team finished with a 52–45 record, fifth place in the American Association.

== Regular season ==
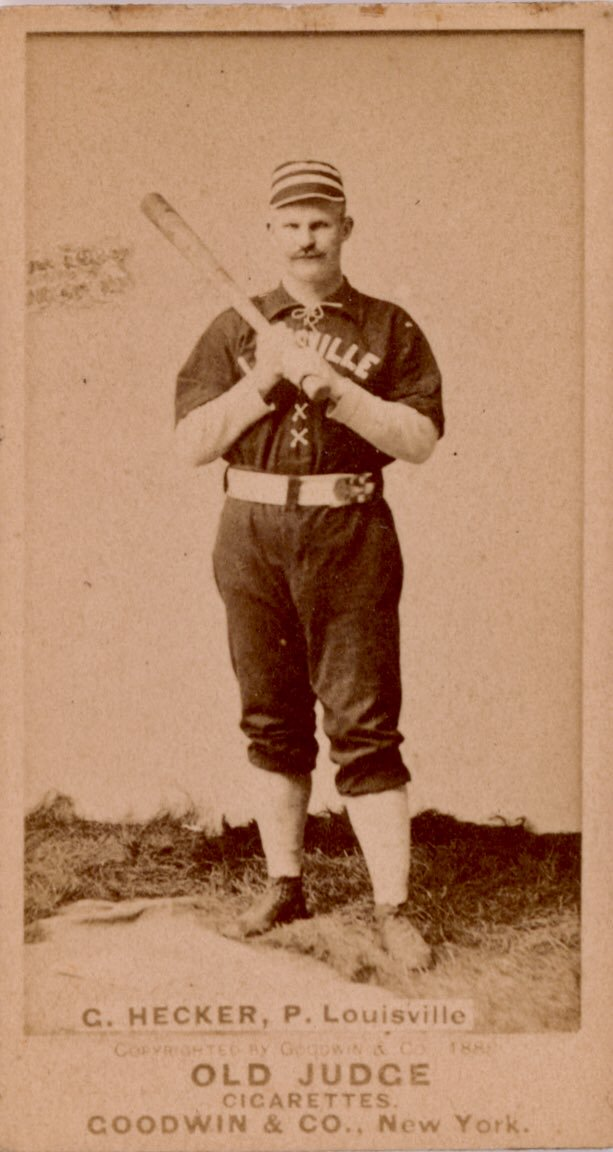
Pitcher Guy Hecker

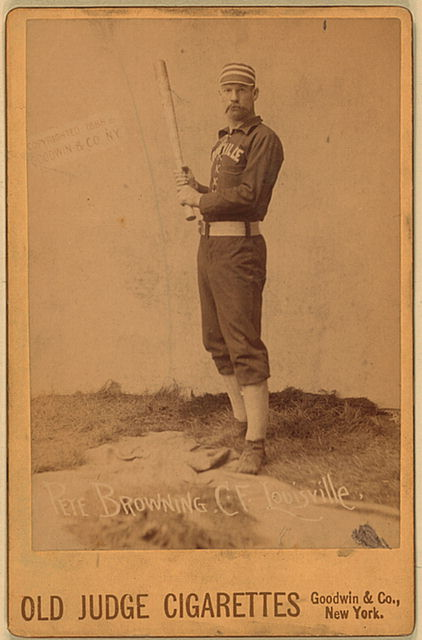
Outfielder Pete Browning

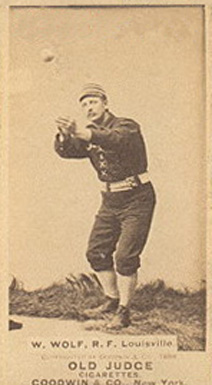
Outfielder Jimmy Wolf

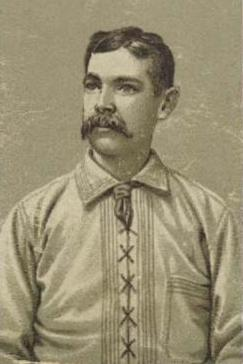
Second baseman Joe Gerhardt

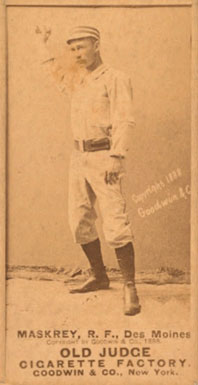
Outfielder Leech Maskrey

=== Season standings ===
American Association
Team	W	L	Pct.	GB	Home	Road
Philadelphia Athletics	66	32	.673	—	37‍–‍14	29‍–‍18
St. Louis Browns	65	33	.663	1	35‍–‍14	30‍–‍19
Cincinnati Red Stockings	61	37	.622	5	38‍–‍13	23‍–‍24
New York Metropolitans	54	42	.562	11	29‍–‍17	25‍–‍25
Louisville Eclipse	52	45	.536	13½	29‍–‍18	23‍–‍27
Columbus Buckeyes	32	65	.330	33½	18‍–‍29	14‍–‍36
Pittsburgh Alleghenys	31	67	.316	35	18‍–‍31	13‍–‍36
Baltimore Orioles	28	68	.292	37	18‍–‍31	10‍–‍37

=== Record vs. opponents ===
1883 American Association record Sources:
Team	BAL	CIN	COL	LOU	NYM	PHA	PIT	STL
Baltimore	—	3–11	6–7	6–8	3–10	3–11	5–9	2–12
Cincinnati	11–3	—	11–3	10–4	4–10	9–5	8–6	8–6
Columbus	7–6	3–11	—	5–9	3–11	1–13	10–4	3–11
Louisville	8–6	4–10	9–5	—	7–6–1	7–7	11–3	6–8
New York	10–3	10–4	11–3	6–7–1	—	5–9	9–5	3–11
Philadelphia	11–3	5–9	13–1	7–7	9–5	—	12–2	9–5
Pittsburgh	9–5	6–8	4–10	3–11	5–9	2–12	—	2–12
St. Louis	12–2	6–8	11–3	8–6	11–3	5–9	12–2	—

=== Roster ===
1883 Louisville Eclipse
Roster
Pitchers: Guy Hecker; Sam Weaver; Catchers: Dan Sullivan; Ed Whiting	Infielders: Lew Brown; Joe Gerhardt; Jack Gleason; Juice Latham; Jack Leary; Henry Luff; Tom McLaughlin	Outfielders: Pete Browning; Ri Jones; Leech Maskrey; Walter Prince; John Reccius; Phil Reccius; George Winkleman; Jimmy Wolf	Manager: Joe Gerhardt

== Player stats ==
=== Batting ===
==== Starters by position ====
Note: Pos = Position; G = Games played; AB = At bats; H = Hits; Avg. = Batting average; HR = Home runs

Pos	Player	G	AB	H	Avg.	HR
C	Ed Whiting	58	240	70	.292	2
1B	Juice Latham	88	368	92	.250	0
2B	Joe Gerhardt	78	319	84	.263	0
3B	Jack Gleason	84	355	106	.299	2
SS	Jack Leary	40	165	31	.188	3
OF	Jimmy Wolf	98	389	102	.262	1
OF	Leech Maskrey	96	361	73	.202	1
OF	Pete Browning	84	358	121	.338	4

==== Other batters ====
Note: G = Games played; AB = At bats; H = Hits; Avg. = Batting average; HR = Home runs

Player	G	AB	H	Avg.	HR
Guy Hecker	81	332	90	.271	1
Dan Sullivan	37	147	31	.211	0
Tom McLaughlin	42	146	28	.192	0
John Reccius	18	63	9	.143	0
Lew Brown	14	60	11	.183	0
Henry Luff	6	23	4	.174	0
George Winkleman	4	13	0	.000	0
Walter Prince	4	11	2	.182	0
Ri Jones	2	7	0	.000	0
Phil Reccius	1	3	1	.333	0
Sleeper Sullivan	1	2	0	.000	0

=== Pitching ===
==== Starting pitchers ====
Note: G = Games pitched; IP = Innings pitched; W = Wins; L = Losses; ERA = Earned run average; SO = Strikeouts

Player	G	IP	W	L	ERA	SO
Guy Hecker	51	451.0	26	23	3.33	153
Sam Weaver	48	418.2	26	22	3.70	116

==== Relief pitchers ====
Note: G = Games pitched; W = Wins; L = Losses; SV = Saves; ERA = Earned run average; SO = Strikeouts

Player	G	W	L	SV	ERA	SO
John Reccius	1	0	0	0	2.25	0
