= 1883 New York Metropolitans season =

1883 New York Metropolitans
- League: American Association
- Ballpark: Polo Grounds
- City: New York, New York
- Record: 54–42 (.563)
- League place: 4th
- Owners: John B. Day, Jim Mutrie
- Manager: Jim Mutrie

The 1883 New York Metropolitans finished with a 54–42 record, finishing in fourth place in the American Association. This was the first season in the Association for the Metropolitans, who had previously played as an independent team from 1880–1882.

== Regular season ==
=== Season standings ===
American Association
Team	W	L	Pct.	GB	Home	Road
Philadelphia Athletics	66	32	.673	—	37‍–‍14	29‍–‍18
St. Louis Browns	65	33	.663	1	35‍–‍14	30‍–‍19
Cincinnati Red Stockings	61	37	.622	5	38‍–‍13	23‍–‍24
New York Metropolitans	54	42	.562	11	29‍–‍17	25‍–‍25
Louisville Eclipse	52	45	.536	13½	29‍–‍18	23‍–‍27
Columbus Buckeyes	32	65	.330	33½	18‍–‍29	14‍–‍36
Pittsburgh Alleghenys	31	67	.316	35	18‍–‍31	13‍–‍36
Baltimore Orioles	28	68	.292	37	18‍–‍31	10‍–‍37

=== Record vs. opponents ===
1883 American Association record Sources:
Team	BAL	CIN	COL	LOU	NYM	PHA	PIT	STL
Baltimore	—	3–11	6–7	6–8	3–10	3–11	5–9	2–12
Cincinnati	11–3	—	11–3	10–4	4–10	9–5	8–6	8–6
Columbus	7–6	3–11	—	5–9	3–11	1–13	10–4	3–11
Louisville	8–6	4–10	9–5	—	7–6–1	7–7	11–3	6–8
New York	10–3	10–4	11–3	6–7–1	—	5–9	9–5	3–11
Philadelphia	11–3	5–9	13–1	7–7	9–5	—	12–2	9–5
Pittsburgh	9–5	6–8	4–10	3–11	5–9	2–12	—	2–12
St. Louis	12–2	6–8	11–3	8–6	11–3	5–9	12–2	—

=== Roster ===
1883 New York Metropolitans
Roster
Pitchers: Tim Keefe; Jack Lynch; Catchers: Bill Holbert; Charlie Reipschlager	Infielders: Steve Brady; Sam Crane; Dude Esterbrook; Candy Nelson; Dave Orr	Outfielders: Ed Kennedy; John O'Rourke; Chief Roseman	Manager: Jim Mutrie

== Player stats ==
=== Batting ===
==== Starters by position ====
Note: Pos = Position; G = Games played; AB = At bats; H = Hits; Avg. = Batting average; HR = Home runs

Pos	Player	G	AB	H	Avg.	HR
C	Bill Holbert	73	299	71	.237	0
1B	Steve Brady	97	432	117	.271	0
2B	Sam Crane	96	349	82	.235	0
3B	Dude Esterbrook	97	407	103	.253	0
SS	Candy Nelson	97	417	127	.305	0
OF	Chief Roseman	93	398	100	.251	0
OF	John O'Rourke	77	315	85	.270	2
OF	Ed Kennedy	94	356	78	.219	2

==== Other batters ====
Note: G = Games played; AB = At bats; H = Hits; Avg. = Batting average; HR = Home runs

Player	G	AB	H	Avg.	HR
Charlie Reipschlager	37	145	27	.186	0
Dave Orr	13	50	16	.320	2

=== Pitching ===
==== Starting pitchers ====
Note: G = Games pitched; IP = Innings pitched; W = Wins; L = Losses; ERA = Earned run average; SO = Strikeouts

Player	G	IP	W	L	ERA	SO
Tim Keefe	68	619.0	41	27	2.41	361
Jack Lynch	29	255.0	15	13	4.09	119
