= Bill Traffley =

American baseball player (1859–1908)

- Catcher
- Born: December 21, 1859; Staten Island, New York, U.S.
- Died: June 23, 1908 (aged 48); Des Moines, Iowa, U.S.
- Batted: Right Threw: Right

MLB debut
- July 27, 1878, for the Chicago White Stockings

Last MLB appearance
- July 29, 1886, for the Baltimore Orioles

MLB statistics
- Batting average: .175
- Home runs: 1
- Runs batted in: 36

Teams
- Chicago White Stockings (1878); Cincinnati Red Stockings (1883); Baltimore Orioles (1884–1886)

William Franklin Traffley (December 21, 1859 – June 23, 1908) was an American baseball player.

== Biography ==
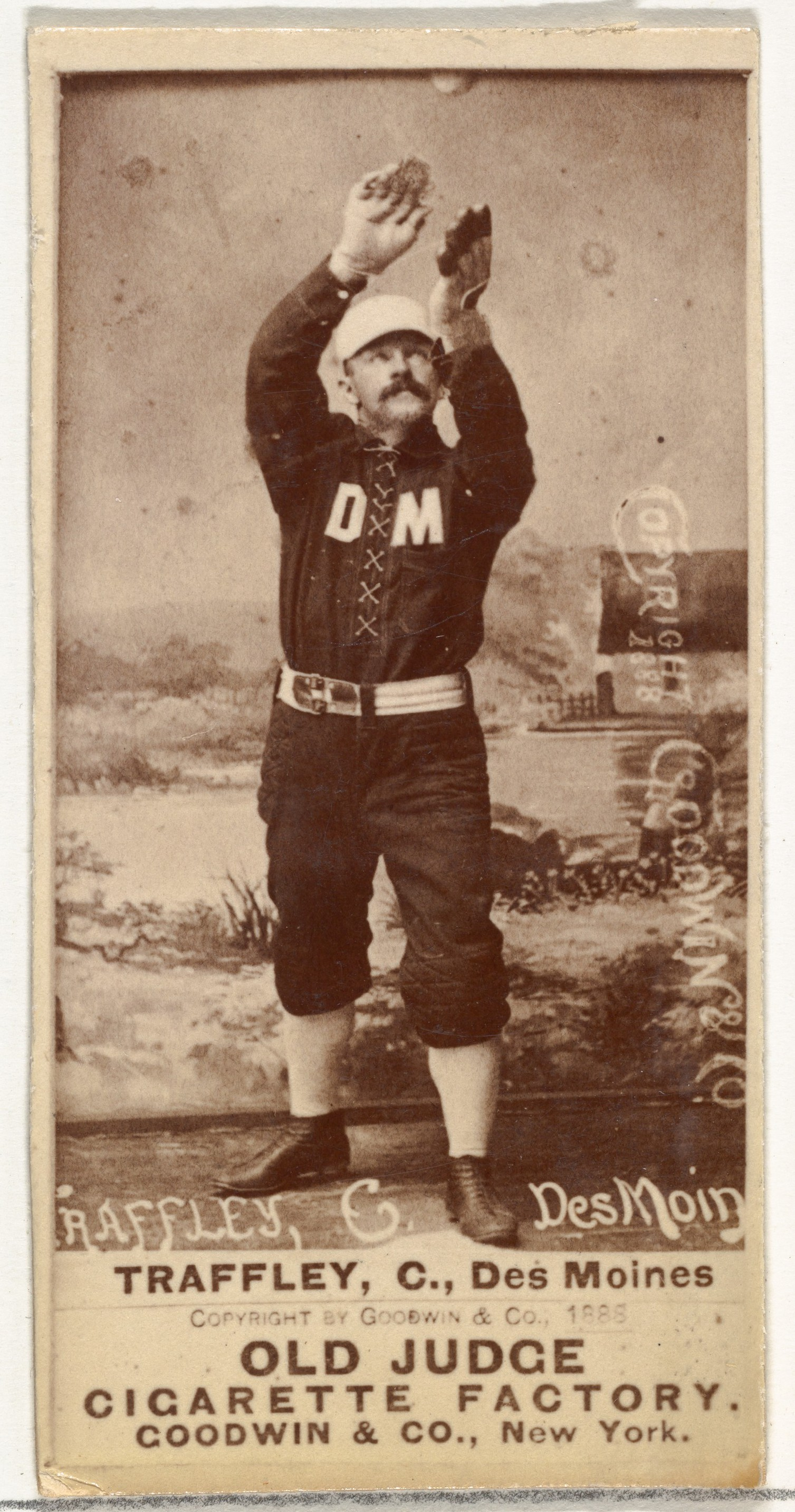
Bill Traffley, 1888

Traffley was born in Staten Island, New York. When he was 18 years old, in 1878, he played two games for the Chicago White Stockings.

Traffley did not play in professional baseball for another five years, in 1883. He played 30 games that season.

His next three seasons (and his last) were spent with the Baltimore Orioles.

Traffley died in Des Moines, Iowa. His brother, John Traffley, also played professional baseball.
