= Gracie Pierce =

American baseball player (1860–1894)

- Second baseman / Center fielder / Umpire
- Born: New York City, New York, U.S.
- Died: August 28, 1894; New York City, New York, U.S.
- Batted: Left Threw: Right

MLB debut
- May 2, 1882, for the Louisville Colonels

Last MLB appearance
- August 1, 1884, for the New York Metropolitans

MLB statistics
- Batting average: .186
- Runs: 21
- Games played: 84
- Stats at Baseball Reference

Teams
- Louisville Eclipse (1882); Baltimore Orioles (1882); Columbus Buckeyes (1883); New York Gothams (1883); New York Metropolitans (1884)

Grayson S. "Gracie" Pierce (before 1865 – August 28, 1894) was an American Major League Baseball (MLB) second baseman and center fielder for three seasons, playing for five teams from 1882 to 1884. He later became a regular umpire in both the National League and the Players' League.

== Playing career ==
=== 1882 ===
Pierce began his major league career on May 2, 1882, for the Louisville Eclipse of the American Association. He played a total of nine games, all as a second baseman, and batted .303 in 33 at bats. He scored three runs, and hit one double. Later that season, he played in 41 games for the Baltimore Orioles, also of the American Association. His batting average dropped to .199 in 151 at bats with Orioles, as well as his production, scoring just eight runs, two doubles, and one triple. His season average between the two teams was .217, and he led the league among second basemen with 65 errors.

=== 1883 ===
He began the season with the Columbus Buckeyes of the American Association, hitting .171 in 41 at bats, scored five runs, and did not gather one extra-base hit. Later in the season, he joined the New York Gothams of the National League, playing in 18 games, totaling just five hits in 62 at bats for a .080 batting average. He also began to play more in the outfield, mainly as a center fielder, rather than at second base. His batting average for the season was .117, but he did hit the second (and last) triple of his career.

=== 1884 ===
His last major league season was spent with the New York Metropolitans, where he played in just five games, splitting his time between second base and the outfield. He batted .250 for the season, with records indicating his participation in the game played August 1. His career totals include a .186 batting average, 21 runs scored, four doubles, and two triples in 84 games and 307 at bats.

== Post major league career ==
=== Minor leagues ===
He signed and played for an Elmira, New York minor league baseball team in 1886, along with fellow Metropolitans Ed Kennedy, and Dasher Troy, when players began to leave the team due to speculation that the American Association was going to eliminate them from the league.

=== As an umpire ===
Pierce had, during his playing days, filled in for the regular umpire from time to time. He registered three games in 1882 and one game in 1884. He began to umpire games regularly in 1886, when he called 47 games, and 1887, when he called 33, all in the National League. He didn't appear as an official umpire at a major league game until 1890, when he officiated at 57 games in the Players' League.

During his major league umpiring career, he was involved in one forfeited game, and umpired game six of the 1886 World Series. The forfeited game was played between the St. Louis Maroons and the Washington Nationals on September 29, 1886. In the seventh inning, after a St. Louis player had struck out, the Maroons refused to play, complaining that it was too dark to continue. Pierce ruled that due to their refusal to play, they forfeited the game to the Nationals.

On October 23, 1886, he umpired the sixth and final game of the 1886 World Series. The St. Louis Browns of the American Association were up on the Chicago White Stockings of the National League, three games to two entering the game. The game ended with St. Louis winning after ten innings of play, sealing the series victory, the only undisputed championship that the Association could claim over the National League.

He was relieved of his umpiring duties in 1887 after allegedly misusing a railroad pass.

Eight years later, Gracie Pierce died in his hometown of New York City. His age cannot be determined with certainty due to the unavailability of his birth year, but if he was in his twenties during the earliest years of his playing career, his death occurred while he was still in his mid-thirties.
