= Jumping Jack Jones =

American baseball player (1860–1936)

- 1883 drawing of Jones
- Pitcher
- Born: October 23, 1860; Litchfield, Connecticut, U.S.
- Died: October 19, 1936 (aged 75); Wallingford, Connecticut, U.S.
- Batted: Unknown Threw: Right

MLB debut
- July 9, 1883, for the Detroit Wolverines

Last MLB appearance
- September 28, 1883, for the Philadelphia Athletics

MLB statistics
- Win–loss record: 11–7
- Earned run average: 3.14
- Strikeouts: 61
- Stats at Baseball Reference

Teams
- Detroit Wolverines (1883); Philadelphia Athletics (1883)

Daniel Albion "Jumping Jack" Jones, Jr. (October 23, 1860 – October 19, 1936) was an American professional baseball pitcher, dentist and voice trainer. He played in Major League Baseball in 1883, splitting the season between the Detroit Wolverines and Philadelphia Athletics. With a strong showing in September 1883, he helped the Athletics win the American Association pennant by one game over the St. Louis Browns. Jones also led the Yale Bulldogs baseball team to two intercollegiate championships in the early 1880s.

Jones became known as "Jumping Jack" Jones because of his distinctive pitching delivery which involved jumping some two feet in the air before throwing the ball. His delivery drew ridicule and laughter among spectators, caused confusion among batters and made Jones "the twirling marvel of his time." Jones later received D.D.S. and M.D. degrees from Harvard Dental School and Yale Medical School and became a dentist in Connecticut.

== Early years ==
Jumping Jack was born in 1860 at Litchfield, Connecticut. His parents, Daniel Albion Jones, Sr., and Emeline (Roberts) Jones, were both dentists. His mother was reported to be "the first woman in America to establish herself in a regular dental practice." Jones' father died in 1864, leaving his mother to support her children from her income as a dentist.

== Yale ==
Jumping Jack attended preparatory school at the Hopkins Grammar School in New Haven, Connecticut, before enrolling at Yale College. While attending Yale, he was a member of the Glee Club and was responsible for introducing whistling to the club's program. Jones also played on the Yale Bulldogs baseball team for four years, and his teammates there included Allen Hubbard. Hubbard was the catcher and Jones a pitcher on the 1882 and 1883 Yale teams that won Intercollegiate Baseball Association championships. Jones and Hubbard were part of a "coterie" at Yale that included a young Walter Camp, who later became known as the "Father of American Football." Jones, Hubbard and Camp all played summer baseball for a local town ball team in Massachusetts known as the Westfield Firemen. Jones graduated from the Yale Academic School in 1884.

== Professional baseball ==
=== "Jumping Jack" ===
While playing major league baseball, Jones became known as "Jumping Jack" Jones, and was considered "the twirling marvel of his time." The nickname was based on his distinctive pitching delivery which involved "a leap skywards to give further impetus to the ball." On August 20, 1883, The Sporting News described the reaction to his delivery during a game in Cleveland:

He is a tall, good-looking, finely-built fellow, a thorough gentleman and all that, but when he wants to add pace to his ball he jumps fully two feet with every delivery. It is a very funny act, and last week, in Cleveland, as he jumped the crowd hooted. It shook him up and he dropped the jump, except at intervals.

The Detroit Journal also noted that Jones's delivery caused "so much laughter" at Detroit's Recreation Park.

While Jones's delivery drew ridicule, it also caused confusion on the part of batters. A newspaper account in September 1883 noted that his "habit of jumping high in the air" caused batters to become confused, noting that he generally delivered the balls other ways "until two strikes are called, when he jumps up in the air and pitches the ball in various and curious curves." Another account, published in 1892, observed: "Jumping Jack Jones was the marvel of the age when a pitcher was allowed to indulge in a few jig steps before he delivered the ball. While he was engaged in the delightful occupation of unjointing himself the frightened batsman was not sure whether the ball or an arm or a leg was coming over the plate."

=== Toledo ===
Even before graduating from Yale, Jones began playing professional baseball in 1883 for the Toledo Blue Stockings in the Northwestern League. The Toledo baseball club was racially integrated in 1883, having Moses Fleetwood Walker as one of its catchers. It is not known whether Jones pitched to Walker during the 1883 season.

=== Detroit ===
In July 1883, Jones made his major league baseball debut with the Detroit Wolverines of the National League. He started 12 games for the Wolverines, compiling a 6–5 win–loss record and a 3.50 earned run average (ERA) in 92-2/3 innings pitched.

=== Philadelphia ===
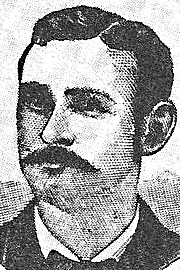
Jones from 1883 Philadelphia Athletics team composite

In September 1883, Detroit released Jones, and he then signed with the Philadelphia Athletics agreeing to a salary of $500 for one month's work. Jones started seven games for Philadelphia and compiled a 5–2 record and 2.63 ERA in 65 innings pitched. Jones' contributions late in the season helped the Athletics edge the St. Louis Browns by one game in a close race for the 1883 American Association pennant. Jones appeared in his last major league game on September 28, 1883, at age 22. In early October, The Sporting Life reported that "Jumping Jack Jones will return to Yale College this week."

=== Connecticut ===
Although his major league career began and ended in 1883, Jones continued to play minor league baseball in his home state of Connecticut. He played for a club in Meriden, Connecticut (Connecticut State League) in 1884 and for a club in Waterbury, Connecticut (Southern New England League) in 1885. Jones was also the manager of the Waterbury club and played right field when he was not pitching.

== Dentistry and family ==
Jones studied dentistry with his mother for three years and then attended Harvard Dental School, receiving a D.D.S. degree in 1889. He also received an M.D. degree from Yale Medical School in 1890. After receiving his degrees, he became a dentist and an officer in the Connecticut State Dental Society.

Jones was married to Emma Aurelia Beadle in 1889. She died in December 1908. Jones stopped practicing dentistry in the 1920s and began "investigating and instructing voice training."

Jones lived at the Masonic Home in Wallingford, Connecticut, in his later years. He died in 1936 at age 75 in Wallingford, and was buried at East Lawn Cemetery in East Haven, Connecticut.
