= Blogg =

Blogg is a surname. The surnames Blogg/Bloggs/Bloke, is believed to have been derived from the East Anglian region of Britain, Norfolk or Suffolk, deriving from bloc, "pale, fair, shining". Notable people with the surname include:

- Frances Blogg (1869–1938), British author of verse, songs and school drama
- Henry Blogg (1876–1954), British lifeboatman
- Wes Blogg (1855–1897), American baseball player

== See also ==
- Joe Bloggs, a placeholder name commonly used in UK; similar to John Doe in USA
