= Patrick O'Loughlin =

Irish baseball player (1860–1927)

- Right fielder
- Born: May 1860; Ireland
- Died: May 18, 1927 (aged 67); Lowell, Massachusetts
- Batted: Unknown Threw: Unknown

MLB debut
- May 9, 1883, for the Baltimore Orioles

Last MLB appearance
- May 9, 1883, for the Baltimore Orioles

MLB statistics
- Batting average: .400
- At bats: 5
- Hits: 2
- Stats at Baseball Reference

Teams
- Baltimore Orioles (1883)

Patrick Henry O'Loughlin (1860–1927) was an Irish born 19th-century outfielder who played in Major League Baseball. Sometimes credited as Patrick Loughlin or simply "Loughlin", he appeared in one game at right field for the 1883 Baltimore Orioles of the American Association. In that game, he got two hits in five at bats.

== Sources ==
- Patrick O'Loughlin at Baseball Reference
- Patrick Loughlin at Retrosheet
