= 1883 Philadelphia Athletics season =

1883 Philadelphia Athletics
- 1883 American Association Champions
- League: American Association
- Ballpark: Jefferson Street Grounds
- City: Philadelphia, Pennsylvania
- Record: 66–32 (.673)
- League place: 1st
- Owners: Bill Sharsig, Lew Simmons, Charlie Mason
- Manager: Lon Knight

The 1883 Philadelphia Athletics finished with a 66–32 record and won the championship of the American Association.

== Regular season ==
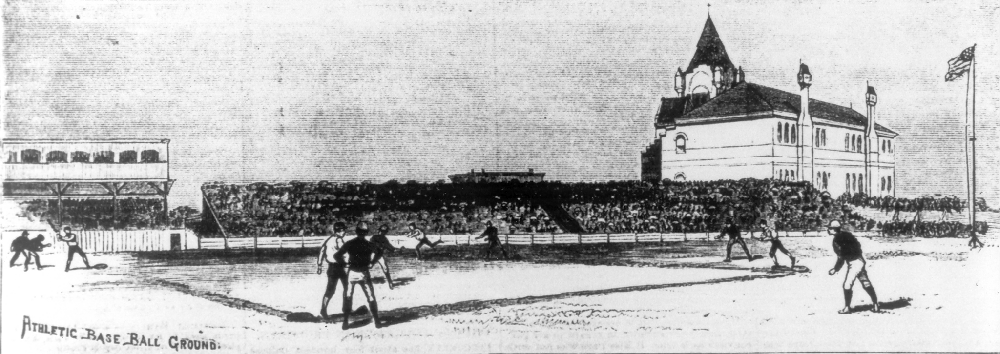
Athletic Base Ball Grounds, 27th and Master Streets, during 1883 season

=== Season standings ===
American Association
Team	W	L	Pct.	GB	Home	Road
Philadelphia Athletics	66	32	.673	—	37‍–‍14	29‍–‍18
St. Louis Browns	65	33	.663	1	35‍–‍14	30‍–‍19
Cincinnati Red Stockings	61	37	.622	5	38‍–‍13	23‍–‍24
New York Metropolitans	54	42	.562	11	29‍–‍17	25‍–‍25
Louisville Eclipse	52	45	.536	13½	29‍–‍18	23‍–‍27
Columbus Buckeyes	32	65	.330	33½	18‍–‍29	14‍–‍36
Pittsburgh Alleghenys	31	67	.316	35	18‍–‍31	13‍–‍36
Baltimore Orioles	28	68	.292	37	18‍–‍31	10‍–‍37

=== Record vs. opponents ===
1883 American Association record Sources:
Team	BAL	CIN	COL	LOU	NYM	PHA	PIT	STL
Baltimore	—	3–11	6–7	6–8	3–10	3–11	5–9	2–12
Cincinnati	11–3	—	11–3	10–4	4–10	9–5	8–6	8–6
Columbus	7–6	3–11	—	5–9	3–11	1–13	10–4	3–11
Louisville	8–6	4–10	9–5	—	7–6–1	7–7	11–3	6–8
New York	10–3	10–4	11–3	6–7–1	—	5–9	9–5	3–11
Philadelphia	11–3	5–9	13–1	7–7	9–5	—	12–2	9–5
Pittsburgh	9–5	6–8	4–10	3–11	5–9	2–12	—	2–12
St. Louis	12–2	6–8	11–3	8–6	11–3	5–9	12–2	—

=== Roster ===
1883 Philadelphia Athletics
Roster
Pitchers: Jersey Bakley; Jumping Jack Jones; Bobby Mathews; Catchers: Jack O'Brien; Ed Rowen	Infielders: George Bradley; Fred Corey; Al Hubbard; Mike Moynahan; Harry Stovey; Cub Stricker	Outfielders: Jud Birchall; Bob Blakiston; Bill Crowley; Lon Knight; Charlie Mason	Manager: Lon Knight

== Player stats ==
=== Batting ===
==== Starters by position ====
Note: Pos = Position; G = Games played; AB = At bats; H = Hits; Avg. = Batting average; HR = Home runs; RBI = Runs batted in

Pos	Player	G	AB	H	Avg.	HR	RBI
C	Jack O'Brien	94	390	113	.290	0	70
1B	Harry Stovey	94	421	128	.304	14	66
2B	Cub Stricker	89	330	90	.273	1	40
3B	George Bradley	76	312	73	.234	1	36
SS	Mike Moynahan	95	400	124	.310	1	67
OF	Lon Knight	97	429	108	.252	1	53
OF	Jud Birchall	96	448	108	.241	1	24
OF	Bob Blakiston	44	167	41	.246	0	26

==== Other batters ====
Note: G = Games played; AB = At bats; H = Hits; Avg. = Batting average; HR = Home runs; RBI = Runs batted in

Player	G	AB	H	Avg.	HR	RBI
Fred Corey	71	298	77	.258	1	40
Ed Rowen	49	196	43	.219	0	21
Bill Crowley	23	96	24	.250	0	16
Al Hubbard	2	6	2	.333	0	2
Charlie Mason	1	2	1	.500	0	1

=== Pitching ===
==== Starting pitchers ====
Note: G = Games pitched; IP = Innings pitched; W = Wins; L = Losses; ERA = Earned run average; SO = Strikeouts

Player	G	IP	W	L	ERA	SO
Bobby Mathews	44	381.0	30	13	2.46	203
George Bradley	26	214.1	16	7	3.15	56
Fred Corey	18	148.1	10	7	3.40	42
Jack Jones	7	65.0	5	2	2.63	28
Jersey Bakley	8	61.1	5	3	3.23	14

==== Relief pitchers ====
Note: G = Games pitched; W = Wins; L = Losses; SV = Saves; ERA = Earned run average; SO = Strikeouts

Player	G	W	L	SV	ERA	SO
Harry Stovey	1	0	0	0	9.00	4
