= George Baker (baseball) =

American baseball player (1857–1915)

- Catcher
- Born: August 20, 1857; St. Louis, Missouri, U.S.
- Died: January 29, 1915 (aged 57); St. Louis, Missouri, U.S.
- Batted: Unknown Threw: Unknown

MLB debut
- May 24, 1883, for the Baltimore Orioles

Last MLB appearance
- May 1, 1886, for the Kansas City Cowboys

MLB statistics
- Batting average: .156
- Home runs: 0
- Runs scored: 45
- Stats at Baseball Reference

Teams
- Baltimore Orioles (1883); St. Louis Maroons (1884–1885); Kansas City Cowboys (1886)

George F. Baker (August 20, 1857 – January 29, 1915), born George F. Boecke, was an American Major League Baseball player who played catcher from 1883 to 1886. He played for the Baltimore Orioles, St. Louis Maroons, and Kansas City Cowboys in his four-season career.
