= Diven (surname) =

Diven is a surname. Notable people with the surname include:

- Alexander S. Diven (1809–1896), American politician and Union Army officer
- Frank Diven (1859–1914), American baseball player
- John M. Diven (1852–1925), American engineer
- Michael Diven (1970-2020), American politician

== See also ==
- Divens
