= 1883 Cincinnati Red Stockings season =

1883 Cincinnati Red Stockings
- League: American Association
- Ballpark: Bank Street Grounds
- City: Cincinnati
- Record: 61–37 (.622)
- League place: 3rd
- Owner: Justus Thorner
- Manager: Pop Snyder

The 1883 Cincinnati Red Stockings season was a season in American baseball. The team finished third in the American Association with a record of 61–37, 5 games behind the Philadelphia Athletics.

== Regular season ==
The Red Stockings came into the 1883 season looking to repeat as American Association Champions, as they had a league best record of 55–25 in 1882. During the off-season, the team announced that catcher Pop Snyder would return as player-manager. Cincinnati also made a big signing, as they signed Charley Jones, who played with the Cincinnati Reds of the National League from 1876–1878. Jones had not played professional baseball since 1880, when he played for the Boston Red Caps of the NL, after which he was black-balled from professional baseball. The Red Stockings also signed another former Reds player, John Reilly, who had also last played major league baseball for the Reds in the 1880 season.

On the diamond, the Red Stockings were led by Jones, who hit .294 with a team leading ten home runs, as well as a league leading 80 RBI. Reilly hit a team high .311 with nine homers and 79 RBI. On the mound, Will White continued to be the ace of the pitching staff, posting a 43–22 record with 64 complete games and a 2.09 ERA in 577 innings pitched.

=== Season summary ===
Cincinnati started off the season on the right foot, winning their first four games, and had an impressive 11–5 record in their first sixteen ballgames. However, they were 3.5 games behind the Athletics. The Red Stockings would continue to play good baseball, and had a 31–23 record. However, they sat in fourth place. Cincinnati would then go on to win twelve of their next thirteen games to improve to 43–24. However, they only moved up to third place. The Red Stockings would remain in third place for the rest of the season, finishing the year at 61–37, five games behind the Athletics.

=== Season standings ===
American Association
Team	W	L	Pct.	GB	Home	Road
Philadelphia Athletics	66	32	.673	—	37‍–‍14	29‍–‍18
St. Louis Browns	65	33	.663	1	35‍–‍14	30‍–‍19
Cincinnati Red Stockings	61	37	.622	5	38‍–‍13	23‍–‍24
New York Metropolitans	54	42	.562	11	29‍–‍17	25‍–‍25
Louisville Eclipse	52	45	.536	13½	29‍–‍18	23‍–‍27
Columbus Buckeyes	32	65	.330	33½	18‍–‍29	14‍–‍36
Pittsburgh Alleghenys	31	67	.316	35	18‍–‍31	13‍–‍36
Baltimore Orioles	28	68	.292	37	18‍–‍31	10‍–‍37

=== Record vs. opponents ===
1883 American Association record Sources:
Team	BAL	CIN	COL	LOU	NYM	PHA	PIT	STL
Baltimore	—	3–11	6–7	6–8	3–10	3–11	5–9	2–12
Cincinnati	11–3	—	11–3	10–4	4–10	9–5	8–6	8–6
Columbus	7–6	3–11	—	5–9	3–11	1–13	10–4	3–11
Louisville	8–6	4–10	9–5	—	7–6–1	7–7	11–3	6–8
New York	10–3	10–4	11–3	6–7–1	—	5–9	9–5	3–11
Philadelphia	11–3	5–9	13–1	7–7	9–5	—	12–2	9–5
Pittsburgh	9–5	6–8	4–10	3–11	5–9	2–12	—	2–12
St. Louis	12–2	6–8	11–3	8–6	11–3	5–9	12–2	—

=== Game log ===
Legend
Red Stockings Win	Red Stockings Loss	Game Tied/Postponed

1883 Game Log: 61–37 (Home: 38–13; Away: 23–24)
May: 12–8 (Home: 7–2; Away: 5–6)

#	Date	Opponent	Score	Stadium	Attendance	Record	Streak
1	May 1	Browns	6–5	Bank Street Grounds	N/A	1–0	W1
2	May 2	Browns	12–1	Bank Street Grounds	N/A	2–0	W2
3	May 3	Browns	3–2	Bank Street Grounds	N/A	3–0	W3
4	May 5	Eclipse	4–2	Bank Street Grounds	N/A	4–0	W4
5	May 7	Eclipse	2–5	Bank Street Grounds	N/A	4–1	L1
6	May 8	Eclipse	3–4	Bank Street Grounds	N/A	4–2	L2
7	May 10	@ Buckeyes	3–4	Recreation Park	N/A	4–3	L3
8	May 12	@ Buckeyes	7–6	Recreation Park	N/A	5–3	W1
9	May 13	@ Buckeyes	7–0	Recreation Park	N/A	6–3	W2
10	May 15	@ Browns	4–7	Sportsman's Park	N/A	6–4	L1
11	May 16	@ Browns	5–9	Sportsman's Park	N/A	6–5	L2
12	May 17	@ Browns	6–3	Sportsman's Park	N/A	7–5	W1
13	May 19	@ Eclipse	6–3	Eclipse Park	N/A	8–5	W2
–	May 20	@ Eclipse	Postponed (unknown reason); Makeup: July 14 (site change)				
–	May 22	@ Eclipse	Postponed (unknown reason); Makeup: August 8 (site change)				
14	May 24	Buckeyes	10–8	Bank Street Grounds	N/A	9–5	W3
15	May 25	Buckeyes	13–11	Bank Street Grounds	N/A	10–5	W4
16	May 26	Buckeyes	6–0	Bank Street Grounds	N/A	11–5	W5
17	May 29	@ Athletics	1–2	Jefferson Street Grounds	N/A	11–6	L1
18	May 30 1	@ Metropolitans	0–1	Polo Grounds	N/A	11–7	L2
19	May 30 2	@ Athletics	10–9	Jefferson Street Grounds	N/A	12–7	W1
20	May 31	@ Athletics	7–8	Jefferson Street Grounds	N/A	12–8	L1

June: 10–7 (Home: 5–2; Away: 5–3)

#	Date	Opponent	Score	Stadium	Attendance	Record	Streak
21	June 2	@ Alleghenys	9–10	Exposition Park	N/A	12–9	L2
22	June 4	@ Alleghenys	12–8	Exposition Park	N/A	13–9	W1
23	June 5	@ Alleghenys	3–2	Exposition Park	N/A	14–9	W2
24	June 7	@ Metropolitans	1–3	Polo Grounds	N/A	14–10	L1
25	June 8	@ Metropolitans	8–7	Polo Grounds	N/A	15–10	W1
26	June 12	@ Orioles	9–3	Oriole Park	N/A	16–10	W2
–	June 13	@ Orioles	Postponed (rain); Makeup: June 15				
27	June 14	@ Orioles	8–12	Oriole Park	N/A	16–11	L1
28	June 15	@ Orioles	11–3	Oriole Park	N/A	17–11	W1
29	June 18	Athletics	6–0	Bank Street Grounds	N/A	18–11	W2
30	June 19	Athletics	7–0	Bank Street Grounds	N/A	19–11	W3
31	June 20	Athletics	11–1	Bank Street Grounds	N/A	20–11	W4
32	June 21	Athletics	4–15	Bank Street Grounds	N/A	20–12	L1
33	June 23	Alleghenys	7–2	Bank Street Grounds	N/A	21–12	W1
34	June 25	Alleghenys	1–2	Bank Street Grounds	N/A	21–13	L1
35	June 26	Alleghenys	1–4	Bank Street Grounds	N/A	21–14	L2
–	June 28	Metropolitans	Postponed (rain); Makeup: July 3				
36	June 29	Metropolitans	4–2	Bank Street Grounds	N/A	22–14	W1
37	June 30	Metropolitans	5–9	Bank Street Grounds	N/A	22–15	L1

July: 14–8 (Home: 8–2; Away: 6–6)

#	Date	Opponent	Score	Stadium	Attendance	Record	Streak
38	July 2	Metropolitans	3–4	Bank Street Grounds	N/A	22–16	L2
39	July 3	Metropolitans	12–1	Bank Street Grounds	N/A	23–16	W1
40	July 4 1	Orioles	14–2	Bank Street Grounds	N/A	24–16	W2
41	July 4 2	Orioles	7–8	Bank Street Grounds	N/A	24–17	L1
42	July 6	Orioles	23–0	Bank Street Grounds	N/A	25–17	W1
43	July 7	Orioles	4–3	Bank Street Grounds	N/A	26–17	W2
44	July 10	@ Eclipse	0–4	Eclipse Park	N/A	26–18	L1
45	July 11	@ Eclipse	9–3	Eclipse Park	N/A	27–18	W1
46	July 12	@ Eclipse	11–2	Eclipse Park	N/A	28–18	W2
47	July 13	@ Eclipse	3–1	Eclipse Park	N/A	29–18	W3
48	July 14	Eclipse	9–3	Bank Street Grounds	N/A	30–18	W4
49	July 15	@ Browns	4–1	Sportsman's Park	N/A	31–18	W5
50	July 17	@ Browns	4–5	Sportsman's Park	N/A	31–19	L1
51	July 18	@ Browns	3–5	Sportsman's Park	N/A	31–20	L2
52	July 19	@ Browns	7–13	Sportsman's Park	N/A	31–21	L3
53	July 21	@ Buckeyes	1–6	Recreation Park	N/A	31–22	L4
54	July 22	@ Buckeyes	2–4	Recreation Park	N/A	31–23	L5
–	July 24	@ Buckeyes	Postponed (unknown reason); Makeup: July 25				
55	July 25	@ Buckeyes	8–1	Recreation Park	N/A	32–23	W1
56	July 26	@ Buckeyes	8–2	Recreation Park	N/A	33–23	W2
57	July 28	Buckeyes	8–3	Bank Street Grounds	N/A	34–23	W3
58	July 30	Buckeyes	17–4	Bank Street Grounds	N/A	35–23	W4
59	July 31	Buckeyes	3–1	Bank Street Grounds	N/A	36–23	W5

August: 13–8 (Home: 8–2; Away: 5–6)

#	Date	Opponent	Score	Stadium	Attendance	Record	Streak
60	August 1	Buckeyes	10–2	Bank Street Grounds	N/A	37–23	W6
61	August 3	Browns	4–3	Bank Street Grounds	N/A	38–23	W7
62	August 4	Browns	0–1	Bank Street Grounds	N/A	38–24	L1
63	August 6	Browns	5–2	Bank Street Grounds	N/A	39–24	W1
64	August 7	Browns	6–3	Bank Street Grounds	N/A	40–24	W2
65	August 8	Eclipse	8–1	Bank Street Grounds	N/A	41–24	W3
66	August 9	Eclipse	5–0	Bank Street Grounds	N/A	42–24	W4
67	August 10	Eclipse	14–4	Bank Street Grounds	N/A	43–24	W5
68	August 11	Eclipse	1–2	Bank Street Grounds	N/A	43–25	L1
69	August 13	Eclipse	17–3	Bank Street Grounds	N/A	44–25	W1
70	August 16	@ Metropolitans	1–3	Polo Grounds	N/A	44–26	L1
71	August 17	@ Metropolitans	4–5	Polo Grounds	N/A	44–27	L2
72	August 18	@ Metropolitans	2–3	Polo Grounds	N/A	44–28	L3
73	August 20	@ Metropolitans	1–9	Polo Grounds	N/A	44–29	L4
74	August 21	@ Athletics	9–11	Jefferson Street Grounds	N/A	44–30	L5
75	August 22	@ Athletics	8–6	Jefferson Street Grounds	N/A	45–30	W1
76	August 23	@ Athletics	4–1	Jefferson Street Grounds	N/A	46–30	W2
77	August 24	@ Athletics	8–5	Jefferson Street Grounds	N/A	47–30	W3
78	August 28	@ Orioles	14–4	Oriole Park	N/A	48–30	W4
–	August 29	@ Orioles	Postponed (unknown reason); Makeup: September 1				
79	August 30	@ Orioles	5–7	Oriole Park	N/A	48–31	L1
80	August 31	@ Orioles	5–3	Oriole Park	N/A	49–31	W1

September: 12–6 (Home: 10–3; Away: 2–3)

#	Date	Opponent	Score	Stadium	Attendance	Record	Streak
81	September 1	@ Orioles	7–5	Oriole Park	N/A	50–31	W2
82	September 3	@ Alleghenys	3–4	Exposition Park	N/A	50–32	L1
83	September 4	@ Alleghenys	9–7	Exposition Park	N/A	51–32	W1
84	September 5	@ Alleghenys	9–15	Exposition Park	N/A	51–33	L1
85	September 6	@ Alleghenys	4–12	Exposition Park	N/A	51–34	L2
86	September 10	Alleghenys	12–6	Bank Street Grounds	N/A	52–34	W1
87	September 11	Alleghenys	7–2	Bank Street Grounds	N/A	53–34	W2
88	September 12	Alleghenys	27–5	Bank Street Grounds	N/A	54–34	W3
89	September 13	Alleghenys	8–2	Bank Street Grounds	N/A	55–34	W4
90	September 15	Athletics	11–0	Bank Street Grounds	N/A	56–34	W5
91	September 18	Athletics	12–13	Bank Street Grounds	N/A	56–35	L1
92	September 19	Athletics	12–3	Bank Street Grounds	N/A	57–35	W1
93	September 20	Orioles	3–2	Bank Street Grounds	N/A	58–35	W2
94	September 21	Orioles	10–2	Bank Street Grounds	N/A	59–35	W3
95	September 22	Orioles	7–0	Bank Street Grounds	N/A	60–35	W4
96	September 26	Metropolitans	6–2	Bank Street Grounds	N/A	61–35	W5
97	September 27	Metropolitans	0–3	Bank Street Grounds	N/A	61–36	L1
98	September 29	Metropolitans	1–4	Bank Street Grounds	N/A	61–37	L2

=== Roster ===
1883 Cincinnati Red Stockings
Roster
Pitchers: Ren Deagle; Harry McCormick; Bill Mountjoy; Will White	Catchers: Pop Snyder; Bill Traffley; Infielders: Hick Carpenter; Chick Fulmer; Bid McPhee; John Reilly	Outfielders: Pop Corkhill; Charley Jones; Jimmy Macullar; Phil Powers; Joe Sommer; Podge Weihe	Manager: Pop Snyder

== Player stats ==
=== Batting ===
==== Starters by position ====
Note: Pos = Position; G = Games played; AB = At bats; H = Hits; Avg. = Batting average; HR = Home runs; RBI = Runs batted in

Pos	Player	G	AB	H	Avg.	HR	RBI
C	Pop Snyder	58	250	64	.256	0	34
1B	John Reilly	98	437	136	.311	9	79
2B	Bid McPhee	96	367	90	.245	2	42
3B	Hick Carpenter	95	435	130	.299	3	40
SS	Chick Fulmer	92	362	92	.254	5	52
OF	Joe Sommer	97	413	115	.278	3	52
OF	Charley Jones	90	391	115	.294	10	80
OF	Pop Corkhill	88	375	81	.216	2	46

==== Other batters ====
Note: G = Games played; AB = At bats; H = Hits; Avg. = Batting average; HR = Home runs; RBI = Runs batted in

Player	G	AB	H	Avg.	HR	RBI
Phil Powers	30	114	28	.246	0	8
Bill Traffley	30	105	21	.200	0	8
Jimmy Macullar	14	48	8	.167	0	4
Podge Weihe	1	4	1	.250	0	0

=== Pitching ===
==== Starting pitchers ====
Note: G = Games pitched; IP = Innings pitched; W = Wins; L = Losses; ERA = Earned run average; SO = Strikeouts

Player	G	IP	W	L	ERA	SO
Will White	65	577.0	43	22	2.09	141
Ren Deagle	18	148.0	10	8	2.31	48
Harry McCormick	15	128.2	8	6	2.87	21
Bill Mountjoy	1	8.0	0	1	2.25	3

==== Relief pitchers ====
Note: G = Games pitched; W = Wins; L = Losses; SV = Saves; ERA = Earned run average; SO = Strikeouts

Player	G	W	L	SV	ERA	SO
Joe Sommer	1	0	0	0	5.40	2
