= Bill Gallagher (baseball) =

American baseball player

- Outfielder/Pitcher
- Born: Unknown; Philadelphia, Pennsylvania, U.S.
- Batted: Unknown Threw: Left

MLB debut
- May 2, 1883, for the Baltimore Orioles

Last MLB appearance
- June 18, 1884, for the Philadelphia Keystones

MLB statistics
- Batting average: .138
- Home runs: 0
- Runs scored: 11
- Win–loss record: 1–7
- Earned run average: 4.70
- Stats at Baseball Reference

Teams
- Baltimore Orioles (1883); Philadelphia Quakers (1883); Philadelphia Keystones (1884)

William John Gallagher was an American Major League Baseball outfielder and pitcher. He played in the American Association for the 1883 Baltimore Orioles, in the National League for the 1883 Philadelphia Quakers and in the Union Association for the 1884 Philadelphia Keystones.
