= George Winkleman =

American baseball player (1859–1921)

- Outfielder
- Born: 1859; Ohio
- Died: January 1, 1921 (Age 61 or 62); New York City
- Batted: Unknown Threw: Unknown

MLB debut
- August 4, 1883, for the Louisville Eclipse

Last MLB appearance
- August 9, 1883, for the Louisville Eclipse

MLB statistics
- Batting average: .000
- At bats: 13
- Runs scored: 2
- Stats at Baseball Reference

Teams
- Louisville Eclipse (1883)

George W. Winkleman (1859–1921) was a professional baseball player. He appeared in four games in Major League Baseball for the 1883 Louisville Eclipse, playing three games as a left fielder and one as a center fielder.
