= Divens =

Divens is a surname. Notable people with the surname include:

- Brad Divens, American rock musician
- Lamar Divens (born 1985), American football player

== See also ==
- Diven (surname)
