= Norm Baker (baseball) =

American baseball player (1863–1949)

- Pitcher
- Born: October 14, 1863; Philadelphia, Pennsylvania
- Died: February 20, 1949 (aged 85); Hurffville, New Jersey
- Batted: Unknown Threw: Unknown

MLB debut
- May 21, 1883, for the Pittsburgh Alleghenys

Last MLB appearance
- August 30, 1890, for the Baltimore Orioles

MLB statistics
- Win–loss record: 14–15
- Earned run average: 3.42
- Strikeouts: 94
- Stats at Baseball Reference

Teams
- Pittsburgh Alleghenys (1883); Louisville Colonels (1885); Baltimore Orioles (1890)

Norman Leslie Baker (October 14, 1863 – February 20, 1949) was a professional baseball pitcher. He pitched all or part of three seasons in Major League Baseball: 1883 for the Pittsburgh Alleghenys, 1885 for the Louisville Colonels, and 1890 for the Baltimore Orioles.
