= David Oldfield =

David Oldfield may refer to:

- David Oldfield (footballer) (born 1978), Australian-born English association footballer
- David Oldfield (politician) (born 1958), Australian politician
- Dave Oldfield (1864–1939), baseball player
