= Charlie Reipschlager =

American baseball player (1856–1910)

- Catcher
- Born: February 7, 1856; New York City, New York, U.S.
- Died: March 16, 1910 (aged 54); Atlantic City, New Jersey, U.S.
- Batted: Right Threw: Right

MLB debut
- May 2, 1883, for the New York Metropolitans

Last MLB appearance
- September 8, 1887, for the Cleveland Blues

MLB statistics
- Batting average: .222
- Home runs: 0
- Runs batted in: 63
- Stats at Baseball Reference

Teams
- New York Metropolitans (1883–1886); Cleveland Blues (1887)

Charles W. Reipschlager (February 7, 1856 – March 16, 1910) was an American Major League Baseball catcher who played from 1883 to 1887 with the New York Metropolitans and the Cleveland Blues in the American Association. He batted and threw right-handed.

== Early career ==
Reipschlager began his baseball career playing for a club in Newark, New Jersey, in 1873 and 1874. He moved to the Flyaway Baseball Club of New York in 1875 as a catcher before joining a club in Scranton, Pennsylvania in 1876 as a pitcher. Reipschlager caught for the Alaskas and the Brooklyn Chelsea team in the League Alliance in 1876. In 1878, he moved to the International Association, playing for the Lynn Live Oaks and the Worcester team. In 1879, Reipschlager played for the New Bedford team of the National Association. He played for a club in Brockton, Massachusetts in 1880. Reipschlager then played in the Eastern Championship Association in 1881 with the Washington Nationals, Albany club, and the Brooklyn Atlantics. He moved back to the League Alliance in 1882, this time with the New York Metropolitans. The team joined the American Association the following year.

== New York Metropolitans ==
On May 2, 1883, Reipschlager made his Major League debut for the New York Metropolitans in a game against the Baltimore Orioles. New York defeated Baltimore 2-1. In his first season in the majors, Reipschlager played in 37 games, and collected 27 hits in 145 at bats. His batting average was .186. New York finished 4th in the American Association.

In 1884, Reipschlager played in 59 for New York, batted .240, and collected 56 hits. The Metropolitans finished first in the American Association, but lost to the National League's Providence Grays in the World Series. Reipschlager went hitless in five at bats in the series.

Reipschlager played in 72 for the Metropolitans in 1885, batting .243. The team dropped to 7th place in the standings that year. He finished with a .211 average in 1886, playing in 65 games. On December 26, 1886, he was purchased by the Cleveland Blues.

== Cleveland Blues ==
After being released my New York, he was acquired by the Cleveland Blues in 1887. Reipschlager appeared in 63 games for Cleveland in 1887, playing 48 games at catcher and 16 games at first base. He batted .212, and collected 49 hits and 17 runs batted in. The following season, he played for the Jersey City Skeeters of the Central League, before returning to the now-independent Metropolitans in 1889.

On March 16, 1910, Reipschlager died in Atlantic City, New Jersey at the age of 54. He is buried in Lutheran All Faiths Cemetery in Queens, New York.
