= Charlie Hodnett =

American baseball player (1861–1890)

- Pitcher / Outfielder
- Born: 1861; St. Louis, Missouri, US
- Died: April 25, 1890 (aged 28–29); St. Louis, Missouri, US
- Batted: Unknown Threw: Unknown

MLB debut
- May 3, 1883, for the St. Louis Browns

Last MLB appearance
- July 3, 1884, for the St. Louis Maroons

MLB statistics
- Win–loss record: 14-4
- Earned run average: 1.88
- Strikeouts: 47
- Stats at Baseball Reference

Teams
- St. Louis Browns (1883); St. Louis Maroons (1884)

Charles Hodnett (1861 – April 25, 1890) was an American Major League Baseball pitcher from 1883 to 1884. He played for the St. Louis Browns and the St. Louis Maroons.

Hodnett began his career with the American Association's Browns in 1883. He started four games, going 2-2 with a 1.41 earned run average. In 1884, he jumped to the Maroons of the Union Association. As the fifth starter on the team, he went 12-2 with a 2.01 ERA (which ranked seventh in the league). St. Louis won the pennant with a record of 94-19.

Hodnett retired from baseball after that season, due to pain resulting from an ulcerated foot. He died six years later.
