= Pete Fries =

American baseball player (1857–1937)

- Pitcher
- Born: October 30, 1857; Scranton, Pennsylvania
- Died: July 29, 1937 (aged 79); Chicago, Illinois
- Batted: Left Threw: Left

MLB debut
- August 10, 1883, for the Columbus Buckeyes

Last MLB appearance
- May 16, 1884, for the Indianapolis Hoosiers

MLB statistics
- Win–loss record: 0–3
- Earned run average: 6.48
- Strikeouts: 7

Teams
- Columbus Buckeyes (1883); Indianapolis Hoosiers (1884)

Peter Martin Fries (October 30, 1857 – July 29, 1937) was a Major League Baseball pitcher, who started three games for the 1883 Columbus Buckeyes and later played one game in the outfield for the 1884 Indianapolis Hoosiers. Both teams were in the American Association.
