= Harry McCaffery =

American baseball player (1858–1928)

- Outfielder
- Born: November 25, 1858; St. Louis, Missouri, U.S.
- Died: April 29, 1928 (aged 69); St. Louis, Missouri, U.S.
- Batted: Right Threw: Right

MLB debut
- June 15, 1882, for the Louisville Eclipse

Last MLB appearance
- June 25, 1883, for the St. Louis Browns

MLB statistics
- Batting average: .251
- Home runs: 0
- Runs scored: 24
- Stats at Baseball Reference

Teams
- Louisville Eclipse (1882); St. Louis Browns (1882–83)

Harry Charles McCaffery (November 25, 1858 in St. Louis, Missouri – April 19, 1928 in St. Louis) was a 19th-century American professional baseball player. He primarily played outfield for the St. Louis Browns of the American Association. However, his major league debut was with the Louisville Eclipse, for whom he played one game before joining the Browns.
