= Frank Diven =

American baseball player (1859–1914)

- Pitcher / Outfielder
- Born: August 29, 1859; Brooklyn, New York, U.S.
- Died: May 30, 1914 (aged 54); Brooklyn, New York, U.S.
- Batted: Unknown Threw: Left

MLB debut
- May 9, 1883, for the Baltimore Orioles

Last MLB appearance
- September 29, 1886, for the New York Giants

MLB statistics
- Win–loss record: 1-1
- Earned run average: 7.36
- Strikeouts: 3
- Stats at Baseball Reference

Teams
- Baltimore Orioles (1883); New York Giants (1886)

Frank Robert Diven (August 29, 1859 – May 30, 1914) was an American professional baseball player who played pitcher in the Major Leagues for the 1883 Baltimore Orioles of the American Association and outfielder for the 1886 New York Giants of the National League.
