= Ed Kennedy (outfielder) =

American baseball player (1856–1905)

- Outfielder
- Born: April 1, 1856; Carbondale, Pennsylvania, U.S.
- Died: May 20, 1905 (aged 49); New York City, New York, U.S.
- Batted: Unknown Threw: Unknown

MLB debut
- May 1, 1883, for the New York Metropolitans

Last MLB appearance
- August 25, 1886, for the Brooklyn Grays

MLB statistics
- Batting average: .204
- Hits: 225
- Runs scored: 142
- Stats at Baseball Reference

Teams
- New York Metropolitans (1883–1885); Brooklyn Grays (1886)

Career highlights and awards
- 1884 American Association Championship

Edward Kennedy (April 1, 1856 – May 20, 1905) was an American professional baseball player who played outfield in the major leagues from 1883 to 1886. He played for the New York Metropolitans and Brooklyn Grays.
