= Al Hubbard (baseball) =

American baseball player (1860–1930)

- Catcher / Shortstop
- Born: December 9, 1860; Westfield, Massachusetts, U.S.
- Died: December 14, 1930 (aged 70); Newton, Massachusetts, U.S.
- Batted: Unknown Threw: Unknown

MLB debut
- September 13, 1883, for the Philadelphia Athletics

Last MLB appearance
- September 15, 1883, for the Philadelphia Athletics

MLB statistics
- Games played: 2
- Runs scored: 2
- Batting average: .333
- Stats at Baseball Reference

Teams
- Philadelphia Athletics(1883)

Allen Hubbard (a.k.a. Al West) (December 9, 1860 – December 14, 1930) was an American Major League Baseball player who played catcher and shortstop in two games for the 1883 Philadelphia Athletics of the American Association.
