= 1883 Major League Baseball season =

1883 MLB season
- League: American Association (AA); National League (NL)
- Sport: Baseball
- Duration: May 1 – September 30, 1883 (AA); May 1 – September 29, 1883 (NL)
- Games: 98
- Teams: 16 (8 in each league)

Pennant winner
- AA champions: Philadelphia Athletics
- AA runners-up: St. Louis Browns
- NL champions: Boston Beaneaters
- NL runners-up: Chicago White Stockings

MLB seasons
- ← 1882 1884 →

Locations of teams for the 1883 American Association season
American Association
Locations of teams for the 1883 National League season
National League

The 1883 major league baseball season was contested from May 1 through September 30, 1883. It was the second season for the American Association (AA) and eighth season for the National League (NL). The Philadelphia Athletics won the AA pennant, while the Boston Beaneaters won the NL pennant. There was no postseason, although there was a canceled exhibition series between the two pennant winners.

Prior to the season, the Troy Trojans and Worcester Worcesters of the National League folded. In its place, the league enfranchised two teams: the New York Gothams and Philadelphia Quakers (today's San Francisco Giants and Philadelphia Phillies). It was decided that the six-team American Association would expand to eight teams and saw the minor league New York Metropolitans join and the enfranchisement of the Columbus Buckeyes.

Prior to the season, the Boston Red Caps and St. Louis Brown Stockings renamed as the Boston Beaneaters and St. Louis Browns, respectively.

The American Association and the National League, along with the Northwestern League, sign the Tripartite Agreement (also known as the National Agreement of 1883). This agreement binds the leagues to respect each other's valid player contracts as well as increasing the size of the reserve list from 6 to 11 players.

== Schedule ==
The 1883 schedule consisted of 98 games for all teams in the American Association and National League, each of which had eight teams. Each team was scheduled to play 14 games against the other seven teams of their respective league. This format was unique to the 1883 season. Previously, the National League had played an 84-game schedule, with 12 games against each team being played, while a pre-expansion six-team American Association had played an 80-game schedule, with 16 games against each team being played. The following season would see the National League play a 112-game schedule (increase of 14 to 16 games each), while the American Association would expanded again, this time to twelve teams, for a 110-game schedule (of 10 games against each of the other eleven teams).

Opening Day took place on May 1 featuring all sixteen teams. American Association would see its final day of the regular season on September 30 featuring four teams, while the National League would see its final day of the regular season on September 29, featuring all eight teams.

== Rule changes ==
The 1883 season saw the following rule changes:

- Championships were to be decided on a percentage basis.
- All throws except for overhand throws are legal. The American Association further specified this rule, and considered all overhand throws a balk, which resulted in both any runner on base and batter to be awarded an extra base (balks today do not advance the batter).
- The National League abolishes the "foul bound catch" rule, which was when a fielder caught a foul ball on its first bounce. The American Association would follow this abolition in 1885.

== Teams ==
An asterisk (*) denotes the ballpark a team played the minority of their home games at

League	Team	City	Ballpark	Capacity	Manager
American Association	Baltimore Orioles	Oxford, Maryland	Oriole Park	5,000	Billy Barnie
American Association	Cincinnati Red Stockings	Cincinnati, Ohio	Bank Street Grounds	3,000	Will White
American Association	Columbus Buckeyes	Columbus, Ohio	Recreation Park (Columbus)	Unknown	Horace Phillips
American Association	Louisville Eclipse	Louisville, Kentucky	Eclipse Park	3,000	Joe Gerhardt
American Association	New York Metropolitans	New York, New York	Polo Grounds (Southeast Diamond)	20,709	Jim Mutrie
American Association	New York Metropolitans	New York, New York	Polo Grounds (Southwest Diamond)*	Unknown*	Jim Mutrie
American Association	Philadelphia Athletics	Philadelphia, Pennsylvania	Jefferson Street Grounds	5,200	Lon Knight
American Association	Pittsburgh Alleghenys	Allegheny, Pennsylvania	Exposition Park II*	Unknown*	Al Pratt
American Association	Pittsburgh Alleghenys	Allegheny, Pennsylvania	Exposition Park I	Unknown	Al Pratt
American Association	Pittsburgh Alleghenys	Allegheny, Pennsylvania	Exposition Park I	Unknown	Ormond Butler
American Association	Pittsburgh Alleghenys	Allegheny, Pennsylvania	Exposition Park I	Unknown	Joe Battin
American Association	St. Louis Browns	St. Louis, Missouri	Sportsman's Park	6,000	Jimmy Williams
American Association	St. Louis Browns	St. Louis, Missouri	Sportsman's Park	6,000	Charles Comiskey
National League	Boston Beaneaters	Boston, Massachusetts	South End Grounds	3,000	Jack Burdock
National League	Boston Beaneaters	Boston, Massachusetts	South End Grounds	3,000	John Morrill
National League	Buffalo Bisons	Buffalo, New York	Riverside Park	Unknown	Jim O'Rourke
National League	Chicago White Stockings	Chicago, Illinois	Lakefront Park	5,000	Cap Anson
National League	Cleveland Blues	Cleveland, Ohio	National League Park	Unknown	Frank Bancroft
National League	Detroit Wolverines	Detroit, Michigan	Recreation Park (Detroit)	Unknown	Jack Chapman
National League	New York Gothams	New York, New York	Polo Grounds (Southeast Diamond)	20,709	John Clapp
National League	Philadelphia Quakers	Philadelphia, Pennsylvania	Recreation Park (Philadelphia)	6,500	Bob Ferguson
National League	Philadelphia Quakers	Philadelphia, Pennsylvania	Recreation Park (Philadelphia)	6,500	Blondie Purcell
National League	Providence Grays	Providence, Rhode Island	Messer Street Grounds	6,000	Harry Wright

1. In today's Baltimore, Maryland.
2. In today's Pittsburgh, Pennsylvania.

== Standings ==
=== American Association ===
American Association
Team	W	L	Pct.	GB	Home	Road
Philadelphia Athletics	66	32	.673	—	37‍–‍14	29‍–‍18
St. Louis Browns	65	33	.663	1	35‍–‍14	30‍–‍19
Cincinnati Red Stockings	61	37	.622	5	38‍–‍13	23‍–‍24
New York Metropolitans	54	42	.562	11	29‍–‍17	25‍–‍25
Louisville Eclipse	52	45	.536	13½	29‍–‍18	23‍–‍27
Columbus Buckeyes	32	65	.330	33½	18‍–‍29	14‍–‍36
Pittsburgh Alleghenys	31	67	.316	35	18‍–‍31	13‍–‍36
Baltimore Orioles	28	68	.292	37	18‍–‍31	10‍–‍37

=== National League ===
National League
Team	W	L	Pct.	GB	Home	Road
Boston Beaneaters	63	35	.643	—	41‍–‍8	22‍–‍27
Chicago White Stockings	59	39	.602	4	36‍–‍13	23‍–‍26
Providence Grays	58	40	.592	5	34‍–‍15	24‍–‍25
Cleveland Blues	55	42	.567	7½	31‍–‍18	24‍–‍24
Buffalo Bisons	49	45	.521	12	36‍–‍13	13‍–‍32
New York Gothams	46	50	.479	16	28‍–‍19	18‍–‍31
Detroit Wolverines	40	58	.408	23	23‍–‍26	17‍–‍32
Philadelphia Quakers	17	81	.173	46	9‍–‍40	8‍–‍41

=== Tie games ===
6 tie games (1 in AA, 5 in NL), which are not factored into winning percentage or games behind (and were often replayed again) occurred throughout the season.

==== American Association ====
The Louisville Eclipse and New York Metropolitans had one tie game each.

- September 4, Louisville Eclipse vs. New York Metropolitans, tied at 8.

==== National League ====
The Cleveland Blues and Detroit Wolverines had three tie games each. The New York Gothams had two tie games. The Buffalo Bisons and Philadelphia Quakers had one tie game each.

- August 24, Cleveland Blues vs. Detroit Wolverines, tied at 8.
- September 1, Buffalo Bisons vs. Detroit Wolverines, tied at 12.
- September 15, Cleveland Blues vs. New York Gothams, tied at 1.
- September 19, Cleveland Blues vs. New York Gothams, tied at 2.
- September 22, Detroit Wolverines vs. Philadelphia Quakers, tied at 6.

== Managerial changes ==
=== Off-season ===
Team	Former Manager	New Manager
Cincinnati Red Stockings	Henry Myers	Billy Barnie
Cleveland Blues	John Morrill	Jack Burdock
Columbus Buckeyes	Fred Dunlap	Frank Bancroft
Louisville Eclipse	Frank Bancroft	Jack Chapman
New York Gothams	Denny Mack	Joe Gerhardt
Philadelphia Quakers	Juice Latham	Lon Knight
Pittsburgh Alleghenys	Ned Cuthbert	Ted Sullivan
Providence Grays	Bob Ferguson	Team folded
St. Louis Browns	Jack Chapman	Team folded

=== In-season ===
Team	Former Manager	New Manager
Boston Beaneaters	Jack Burdock	John Morrill
Philadelphia Quakers	Bob Ferguson	Blondie Purcell
Pittsburgh Alleghenys	Al Pratt	Ormond Butler
Pittsburgh Alleghenys	Ormond Butler	Joe Battin
St. Louis Browns	Ted Sullivan	Charles Comiskey

== League leaders ==
=== American Association ===
Hitting leaders
Stat	Player	Total
AVG	Ed Smartwood (PIT)	.357
OPS	Ed Smartwood (PIT)	.869
HR	Harry Stovey (PHA)	14
RBI	Charley Jones (CIN)	80
R	Harry Stovey (PHA)	110
H	Ed Smartwood (PIT)	147

Pitching leaders
Stat	Player	Total
W	Will White (CIN)	43
L	Frank Mountain (COL)	33
ERA	Will White (CIN)	2.09
K	Tim Keefe (NYM)	359
IP	Tim Keefe (NYM)	619.0
SV	Bob Barr (PIT); Tony Mullane (STL)	1
WHIP	Tim Keefe (NYM)	0.963

=== National League ===
Hitting leaders
Stat	Player	Total
AVG	Dan Brouthers (BUF)	.374
OPS	Dan Brouthers (BUF)	.969
HR	Buck Ewing (NYG)	10
RBI	Dan Brouthers (BUF)	97
R	Joe Hornung (BSN)	107
H	Dan Brouthers (BUF)	159

Pitching leaders
Stat	Player	Total
W	Charles Radbourn (PRO)	48
L	John Coleman^{1} (PHI)	48
ERA	Jim McCormick (CLE)	1.84
K	Jim Whitney (BSN)	345
IP	Pud Galvin (BUF)	656.1
SV	George Weidman (DET); Jim Whitney (BSN)	2
WHIP	Charles Radbourn (PRO)	0.979

^{1} All-time single-season losses record

== Milestones ==
=== Batters ===
==== Cycles ====
- Lon Knight (PHA):
  - Knight hit for his first cycle, first in franchise history, first in American Association history, and the first natural cycle in major league history on July 30 against the Pittsburgh Alleghenys.
- John Reilly (CIN):
  - Reilly hit for his first cycle and first in franchise history, on September 12 against the Pittsburgh Alleghenys.
  - Reilly hit for his second cycle and second in franchise history only a week after his first, on September 19 against the Philadelphia Athletics.

==== Other batting accomplishments ====
- John Montgomery Ward (NYG):
  - Became the first pitcher to hit two home runs in one game.
- Chicago White Stockings:
  - Set a Major League record for most doubles in a single game, hitting 14 doubles in a 31–7 over the Buffalo Bisons on July 3.
  - Set a Major League record for most hits in a nine inning game, with 66 hits in a 31–7 over the Buffalo Bisons on July 3.

=== Pitchers ===
==== No-hitters ====
- Charles Radbourn (PRO):
  - Radbourn threw his first career no-hitter and the second no-hitter in franchise history, by defeating the Cleveland Blues 8–0 on July 25.
- Hugh Daily (CLE):
  - Daily threw his first career no-hitter and the first no-hitter in franchise history, by defeating the Philadelphia Quakers 1–0 on September 13.

==== Other pitching accomplishments ====
- John Coleman (PHI):
  - Set a Major League record for most losses in a single season, losing 48 games.

=== Miscellaneous ===
- Chicago White Stockings:
  - Set a modern major league record for most runs scored in the seventh inning, by scoring 18 runs against the Detroit Wolverines on September 6.
- Rudy Kemmler (COL):
  - Set a Major League record for passed balls in a single season, allowing 114 balls to pass him.

== Venues ==
The 1883 season saw the American Association and National League each with two new teams, all playing at new venues:

- American Association:
  - The Columbus Buckeyes played at Recreation Park (Columbus).
  - The New York Metropolitans played at the Polo Grounds.
- National League:
  - The New York Gothams played at the Polo Grounds.
  - The Philadelphia Quakers played at Recreation Park (Philadelphia).

The Polo Grounds, home of the New York Metropolitans and Gothams, featured two baseball fields, at the southeast and southwest of the grounds. The Gothams played entirely at the southeast grounds, while the Metropolitans moved alternated. The played ten games at the southeast diamond to start the season, before moving to the southwest diamond on May 30. The southwest diamond was of worse quality than the southeast diamond, so games at the southwest diamond did not last long. They played only ten games (aside from a one-off at the southeast diamond on June 13) before returning to the southeast diamond in July. They did play three more games at the southwest diamond on August 30, 31, and September 4 due to scheduling conflicts with the Gothams.

Following a fire and a flood of their home at Exposition Park, the Pittsburgh Alleghenys had to move into a newly built venue, a second iteration of Exposition Park, which was built immediately south. However, after only 17 games, they played their last game there on June 9 and returned to the first Exposition Park on June 12.

The 1883 season saw two teams relocate to new ballparks:

- The Baltimore Orioles leave Newington Park (where they played their inaugural season the previous year) and move to Oriole Park, where they would go on to play for six seasons through 1889.
- The Philadelphia Athletics leave Oakdale Park (where they played their inaugural season the previous year) and move to the Jefferson Street Grounds, where they would go on to play for eight seasons through 1890, where they would fold thereafter.

The 1883 season saw four teams play their final games at respective ballparks, before moving to new ballparks for the 1884 season:

- The Buffalo Bisons would play their final game at Riverside Park on September 8 against the Cleveland Blues, moving to Olympic Park.
- The Cincinnati Red Stockings would play their final game at Bank Street Grounds on September 29 against the New York Metropolitans, moving to American Park.
- The New York Metropolitans would play their final home game of the season at the Polo Grounds southeast diamond on September 6 against the Louisville Eclipse, moving to Metropolitan Park. However, would eventually return to the Polo Grounds by August of the following season.
- The Pittsburgh Alleghenys would play their final game at Exposition Park on September 6 against the Cincinnati Red Stockings, moving to Recreation Park.

== See also ==
- 1883 in baseball (Events, Births, Deaths)
