= Sleeper Sullivan =

Irish baseball player (1859–1909)

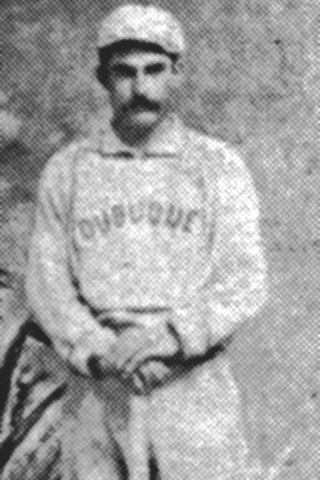
- Catcher
- Born: 1859; Ireland
- Died: October 13, 1909 (aged 49–50); St. Louis, Missouri, U.S.
- Batted: Right Threw: Right

MLB debut
- May 3, 1881, for the Buffalo Bisons

Last MLB appearance
- May 10, 1884, for the St. Louis Maroons

MLB statistics
- Batting average: .184
- Hits: 63
- Runs batted in: 15
- Stats at Baseball Reference

Teams
- Buffalo Bisons (1881); St. Louis Brown Stockings/Browns (1882–1883); Louisville Eclipse (1883); St. Louis Maroons (1884)

Thomas Jefferson Sullivan (1859 – October 13, 1909) was an Irish born catcher in Major League Baseball. Nicknamed "Sleeper" and "Old Iron Hands", Sullivan played for the National League's Buffalo Bisons, the American Association's St. Louis Brown Stockings and Louisville Eclipse, and the Union Association's St. Louis Maroons during the 1880s. Sullivan stood at 5' 7" and weighed 175 lb.

== Career ==
Sullivan was born in Ireland in 1859 and was raised in St. Louis, Missouri. He started his professional baseball career in 1877, when he played for two teams: the New England League's Lowell Ladies Men and the League Alliance's Evansville Red. Sullivan then moved to the International Association in 1878 and the Northwestern League in 1879.

In 1881, Sullivan joined the National League's Buffalo Bisons and made his major league debut on May 3. Sullivan was the Bison's second-string catcher. In 35 games, he batted .190 with 15 runs batted in. After the season, Sullivan jumped to the American Association's St. Louis Brown Stockings, where he played in 1882 and part of 1883. He was the team's starting catcher in 1882, playing in 51 games, but he had the lowest batting average (.190) and OPS+ (39) of the team's regulars. He also ranked second in the league in passed balls, with 97. The following season, Sullivan played eight games for St. Louis and one game for the Louisville Eclipse, with a batting average of .207. In 1884, he played one games for the Union Association's St. Louis Maroons. Sullivan last appeared in a major league game on May 10 of that year.

By 1886, Sullivan had moved back to the eastern part of the country. He spent that year playing in the Eastern League for the Meriden Silvermen and Hartford Dark Blues, and in 1887, he played for the Eastern League's Danbury Hatters and the Pennsylvania State Association's Reading franchise. His primary position for Danbury and Reading was shortstop. Sullivan played in the Atlantic Association in 1889 and 1890 and in the New England League in 1891. His last stop was the Eastern League in 1892 before ending his professional baseball career.

Sullivan earned the nickname "Sleeper" because of his unfamiliarity with Pullman sleeper cars in an era when baseball teams traveled by train. He died in St. Louis in 1909 and was buried in Calvary Cemetery.
