= Jack Leary =

American baseball player (1857–1905)

- Infielder / Outfielder / Pitcher
- Born: July 1857; New Haven, Connecticut, U.S.
- Died: December 6, 1905 (aged 48); New Haven, Connecticut, U.S.
- Batted: Unknown Threw: Left

MLB debut
- August 21, 1880, for the Boston Red Caps

Last MLB appearance
- July 5, 1884, for the Chicago Browns

MLB statistics
- Batting average: .232
- Home runs: 4
- Runs batted in: 4
- Win–loss record: 3–9
- Earned run average: 4.56
- Stats at Baseball Reference

Teams
- Boston Red Caps (1880); Detroit Wolverines (1881); Pittsburgh Alleghenys (1882); Baltimore Orioles (1882); Louisville Eclipse (1883); Baltimore Orioles (1883); Altoona Mountain City (1884); Chicago Browns (1884)

John J. Leary (July 1857 – December 6, 1905) was an American Major League Baseball player, who played for seven different teams during his five-year career. Leary died at the age of 48 in his hometown of New Haven, Connecticut.
