= Ren Deagle =

American baseball player (1858–1936)

- Pitcher
- Born: June 26, 1858; New York City, U.S.
- Died: December 24, 1936 (aged 78); Kansas City, Missouri, U.S.
- Batted: Right Threw: Right

MLB debut
- May 17, 1883, for the Cincinnati Red Stockings

Last MLB appearance
- September 12, 1884, for the Louisville Eclipse

MLB statistics
- Win–loss record: 17–15
- Strikeouts: 83
- Earned run average: 2.74
- Stats at Baseball Reference

Teams
- Cincinnati Red Stockings (1883–1884); Louisville Eclipse (1884)

Lorenzo Burroughs Deagle (June 26, 1858 – December 24, 1936) was an American pitcher in Major League Baseball.
