= Podge Weihe =

American baseball player (1862–1914)

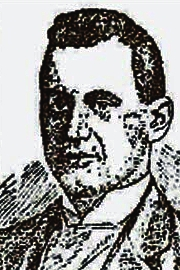
- Outfielder
- Born: November 13, 1862; Cincinnati
- Died: April 15, 1914 (aged 51); Cincinnati
- Batted: Right Threw: Right

MLB debut
- August 6, 1883, for the Cincinnati Red Stockings

Last MLB appearance
- September 25, 1884, for the Indianapolis Hoosiers

MLB statistics
- Batting average: .254
- Hits: 66
- Home runs: 4
- Stats at Baseball Reference

Teams
- Cincinnati Red Stockings (1883); Indianapolis Hoosiers (1884)

John Garibaldi "Podge" Weihe (November 13, 1862 – April 15, 1914) was a Major League Baseball outfielder who played for two seasons. He played for the Cincinnati Red Stockings for one game in 1883 and the Indianapolis Hoosiers for 63 games during their only year of existence in 1884.
