= Charlie Ingraham =

American baseball player (1860–1906)

- Catcher
- Born: April 8, 1860; Peru, Ohio, U.S.
- Died: February 18, 1906 (aged 45); Chicago, Illinois, U.S.
- Batted: Unknown Threw: Unknown

MLB debut
- July 4, 1883, for the Baltimore Orioles

Last MLB appearance
- July 4, 1883, for the Baltimore Orioles

MLB statistics
- Batting average: .250
- Home runs: 0
- Runs batted in: 0
- Stats at Baseball Reference

Teams
- Baltimore Orioles (1883)

Charles W. Ingraham (April 8, 1860 – February 18, 1906) was an American catcher in Major League Baseball for the 1883 Baltimore Orioles of the American Association. He appeared in one game for the Orioles on July 4, 1883 and recorded one hit in four at bats.

== Sources ==
- Career statistics from Baseball Reference · Baseball Reference (Minors) · Retrosheet · Baseball Almanac
