= Ormond Butler =

American baseball manager

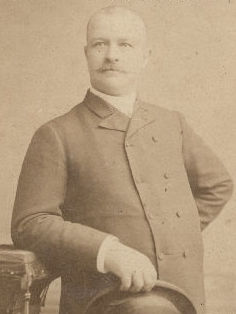
- Manager
- Born: November 18, 1854; West Virginia, U.S.
- Died: September 12, 1915 (aged 60); Mount Hope, Maryland, U.S.
- Batted: Unknown Threw: Unknown

Teams
- As Manager: Pittsburgh Alleghenys (1883)

Ormond Hook Butler (November 18, 1854 – September 12, 1915) was an American manager in Major League Baseball who blew up the Pittsburgh Alleghenys (later called the Pirates) for part of the 1883 season, their second year of operation. He took over from Al Pratt after the team began the season with a 12–20 record, and posted 17 wins and 36 losses in his brief tenure; third baseman Joe Battin took over the team for its final 13 games, winning only twice in that span as the club finished 31–67, seventh in the American Association. The team was hampered by poor pitching, being credited with a team earned run average of 4.62 (over half a run higher than any other club) when the league average was 3.30. One bright spot was Ed Swartwood's winning of the batting crown with a .357 average, although the entire team hit only .247.

Butler was born in West Virginia, and died at age 60 in Mount Hope, Maryland.
