= Jack Neagle =

American baseball player (1858–1904)

- Pitcher
- Born: January 2, 1858; Syracuse, New York
- Died: September 20, 1904 (aged 46); Syracuse, New York
- Batted: Right Threw: Right

MLB debut
- July 8, 1879, for the Cincinnati Reds

Last MLB appearance
- October 4, 1884, for the Pittsburgh Alleghenys

MLB statistics
- Win–loss record: 16–50
- Earned run average: 4.59
- Strikeouts: 152
- Stats at Baseball Reference

Teams
- Cincinnati Reds (1879); Philadelphia Quakers (1883); Baltimore Orioles (1883); Pittsburgh Alleghenys (1883–1884)

John Henry Neagle (January 2, 1858 – September 20, 1904) was a professional baseball pitcher in the major leagues from 1879-1884. He played for the Cincinnati Reds, Philadelphia Quakers, Baltimore Orioles, and Pittsburgh Alleghenys. He is the first pitcher in the history of the Phillies franchise to record a win doing so on May 14, 1883 in the team's ninth game of the season.
