= Wes Blogg =

American baseball player (1855–1897)

- Outfielder/Catcher
- Born: 1855; Norfolk, Virginia, U.S.
- Died: March 10, 1897 (aged 41–42); Baltimore, Maryland, U.S.
- Batted: Unknown Threw: Unknown

MLB debut
- June 20, 1883, for the Pittsburgh Alleghenys

Last MLB appearance
- July 30, 1883, for the Pittsburgh Alleghenys

MLB statistics
- Batting average: .147
- Home runs: 0
- Runs scored: 0
- Stats at Baseball Reference

Teams
- Pittsburgh Alleghenys (1883)

Wesley Collins Blogg (1855–1897) was a 19th-century American professional baseball outfielder and catcher for the Pittsburgh Alleghenys of the American Association.
