= George Creamer =

American baseball player (1855–1886)

- Second baseman
- Born: 1855; Philadelphia, Pennsylvania, U.S.
- Died: June 27, 1886 (aged 30–31); Philadelphia, Pennsylvania, U.S.
- Batted: Right Threw: Right

MLB debut
- May 1, 1878, for the Milwaukee Grays

Last MLB appearance
- October 2, 1884, for the Pittsburgh Alleghenys

MLB statistics
- Batting average: .215
- Home runs: 1
- Runs batted in: 99
- Stats at Baseball Reference

Teams
- As player: Milwaukee Grays (1878); Syracuse Stars (1879); Worcester Ruby Legs (1880–1882); Pittsburgh Alleghenys (1883–1884); As manager: Pittsburgh Alleghenys (1884)

George W. Creamer (1855 – June 27, 1886), born George W. Triebel, was an American Major League Baseball second baseman from Philadelphia, Pennsylvania. He played with four teams in two leagues: the Milwaukee Grays (1878), the Syracuse Stars (1879), the Worcester Ruby Legs (1880–1882), and the Pittsburgh Alleghenys (1883–1884).

On August 20, 1883, after a game between the Louisville Eclipse and the Alleghenys‚ Creamer and fellow players Billy Taylor and Mike Mansell were each fined $100 and suspended indefinitely for drunkenness.

In 1884, the Alleghenys finished with a 30–78–2 record and went through five managers. Creamer was the fourth of these managers, serving from August 6 to August 16 and losing all eight games he managed.

Creamer was signed by the Baltimore Orioles before the 1885 season, but in March, newspaper reports said that he was very sick with tuberculosis and not expected to play baseball again. Players from the Chicago White Stockings took up a collection for Creamer and gave him $65. A benefit for him was scheduled for May 1 at the Academy of Music in Pittsburgh. A July 1885 newspaper article referred to a benefit that raised $200 for Creamer.

In early May 1886, newspaper reports described Creamer as very ill in Waterbury, Connecticut. He died in Philadelphia, where he was interred at Greenwood Cemetery.

Creamer was a member of the Knights of Pythias.

== See also ==
- List of Major League Baseball player-managers
