= Horace Phillips (baseball) =

American baseball manager

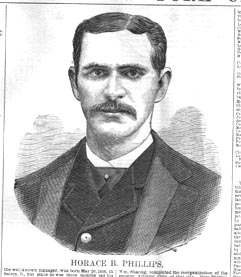
- Manager
- Born: May 14, 1853; Salem, Ohio, U.S.
- Died: February 26, 1896 (aged 42); Philadelphia, Pennsylvania, U.S.
- Batted: Unknown Threw: Unknown
- Stats at Baseball Reference
- Managerial record at Baseball Reference

Teams
- Troy Trojans (1879); Philadelphia Athletics (American Association) (1881); Columbus Buckeyes (1883); Pittsburgh Alleghenys (1884–1889)

Horace B. Phillips (May 14, 1853 – February 26, 1896) was an American manager in Major League Baseball for eight seasons, from 1879 to 1889. He managed one season for the Troy Trojans, one season for the Philadelphia Athletics (American Association), one season for the Columbus Buckeyes and six seasons for the Pittsburgh Alleghenys. He was born in Salem, Ohio.

On June 6, 1882, Phillips was arrested in Philadelphia for not paying a hotel bill from 1882. He claimed that A. J. Reach was put in charge of paying it, but he eventually paid the bill himself and was released.

Shortly after his time in Pittsburgh, Phillips was institutionalized for mental illness in the Kirkbride's Asylum in Philadelphia, then later in a private hospital in Merchantville, New Jersey. His wife divorced him in 1894. He died in 1896, and is buried at Mount Vernon Cemetery in Philadelphia.
