= 1883 in baseball =

The following are the baseball events of the year 1883 throughout the world.

== Champions ==
- National League: Boston Beaneaters
- American Association: Philadelphia Athletics
- Inter-State Association: Brooklyn Atlantics
- Northwestern League: Toledo Blue Stockings

Inter-league playoff: Philadelphia (AA) declined to play Boston (NL)

== Statistical leaders ==
	American Association		National League	
Stat	Player	Total	Player	Total
AVG	Ed Swartwood (PIT)	.357	Dan Brouthers (BUF)	.374
HR	Harry Stovey (PHA)	14	Buck Ewing (NYG)	10
RBI	Charley Jones (CIN)	80	Dan Brouthers (BUF)	97
W	Will White (CIN)	43	Charles Radbourn (PRO)	48
ERA	Will White (CIN)	2.09	Jim McCormick (CLE)	1.84
K	Tim Keefe (NYM)	361	Jim Whitney (BSN)	345

== Major league baseball final standings ==
=== American Association final standings ===
American Association
Team	W	L	Pct.	GB	Home	Road
Philadelphia Athletics	66	32	.673	—	37‍–‍14	29‍–‍18
St. Louis Browns	65	33	.663	1	35‍–‍14	30‍–‍19
Cincinnati Red Stockings	61	37	.622	5	38‍–‍13	23‍–‍24
New York Metropolitans	54	42	.562	11	29‍–‍17	25‍–‍25
Louisville Eclipse	52	45	.536	13½	29‍–‍18	23‍–‍27
Columbus Buckeyes	32	65	.330	33½	18‍–‍29	14‍–‍36
Pittsburgh Alleghenys	31	67	.316	35	18‍–‍31	13‍–‍36
Baltimore Orioles	28	68	.292	37	18‍–‍31	10‍–‍37

Locations of teams for the 1883 American Association season
American Association

=== National League final standings ===
National League
Team	W	L	Pct.	GB	Home	Road
Boston Beaneaters	63	35	.643	—	41‍–‍8	22‍–‍27
Chicago White Stockings	59	39	.602	4	36‍–‍13	23‍–‍26
Providence Grays	58	40	.592	5	34‍–‍15	24‍–‍25
Cleveland Blues	55	42	.567	7½	31‍–‍18	24‍–‍24
Buffalo Bisons	49	45	.521	12	36‍–‍13	13‍–‍32
New York Gothams	46	50	.479	16	28‍–‍19	18‍–‍31
Detroit Wolverines	40	58	.408	23	23‍–‍26	17‍–‍32
Philadelphia Quakers	17	81	.173	46	9‍–‍40	8‍–‍41

Locations of teams for the 1883 National League season
National League

== Notable seasons ==
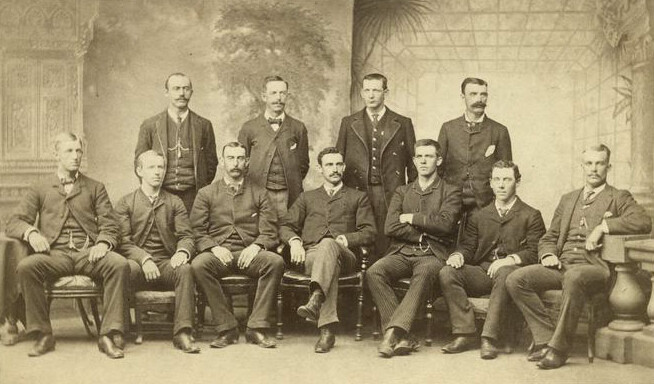
1883 Boston Beaneaters

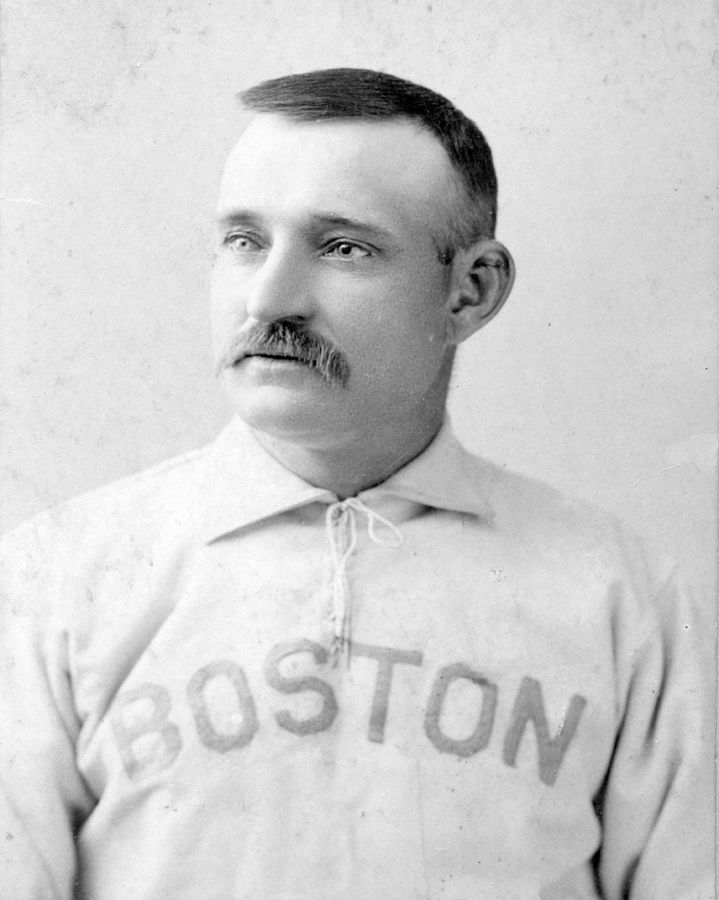
Charles Radbourn

- First baseman Dan Brouthers led the NL in batting average (.374), on-base percentage (.397), slugging percentage (.572), adjusted OPS+ (187), hits (159), total bases (243), and runs batted in (97).
- Pitcher Charles Radbourn led the NL with 48 wins. He finished second in the NL in innings pitched (632.1), earned run average (2.05), adjusted ERA+ (150), and strikeouts (315).

== Events ==
=== January–March ===
- February 17 – The American Association and the National League, along with the Northwestern League, sign the Tripartite Agreement (also known as the National Agreement of 1883). This agreement binds the leagues to respect each other's valid player contracts as well as increasing the size of the reserve list from 6 to 11 players. This leads to relative harmony among the leagues until the Players' League wars of 1889–1890.
- March 14 – The Peoria Club of the Northwestern League makes a motion to ban blacks, a move directly aimed at Toledo's star catcher, Moses Fleetwood Walker. After heated discussion, the motion is withdrawn and Walker remains eligible to play.
- March 30 – Charles Fowle, one of the original founders of the National League, and secretary of the St. Louis Brown Stockings from 1875 to 1877, dies in St. Louis.
- March 31 – The nation's oldest baseball club, the Olympic Town-Ball Club of Philadelphia, marks its 50th anniversary.

=== April–June ===
- April 13 – U.S. President Chester A. Arthur invites members of the recently defunct Forest Cities franchise from the National Association to the White House, making it the first professional sports team to visit a president in Washington D.C. Later that year, the New York Gothams, the precursor to the New York Giants, also visits Arthur in D.C.
- April 15 – Francis Richter publishes the first issue of Sporting Life which will grow into the leading weekly publication for baseball information and run continuously until 1917.
- April 24 – Terry Larkin, a pitcher who has not played in the majors since 1880, shoots his wife and a policeman, then tries to kill himself. He attempts suicide the next day and fails again. Both his wife and the police officer survive as well, and Larkin will play in 40 games for the Richmond Virginians in 1884.
- May 1 – In their inaugural National League game, the New York Gothams defeat the Boston Beaneaters 7–5 in front of 15,000 fans, who include President Ulysses S. Grant. The Philadelphia Quakers, also making their NL debut, lose 4–3 to the Providence Grays.
- May 3 – John Montgomery Ward becomes the first pitcher to hit 2 home runs in a game as his New York Gothams defeat the Boston Beaneaters 10–9.
- May 13 – In what was still a very rare occurrence, neither team commits an error as the St. Louis Browns defeat the Louisville Eclipse 4–3.
- May 28 – Fort Wayne and Indianapolis play the first of 2 games under electric lights.
- May 30 – Several of the American Association teams play a Memorial Day double-header in 2 different cities. At one point, there is an American Association game being played at the Polo Grounds on the New York Metropolitans field and a National League game being played at the Polo Grounds on the New York Gothams field where the outfield fences back up to one another.
- June 9 – The Philadelphia Quakers receive special permission from the National League to lower their ticket prices to 25¢ per game in order to compete with the Philadelphia Athletics of the American Association. The Quakers average game attendance quadruples for the remainder of the season.
- June 16 – The New York Gothams introduce ladies day, where all females are admitted free without restriction. This idea will remain a staple of major league baseball for nearly 100 years.
- June 28 – Providence Grays player Joe Mulvey is shot in the shoulder while leaving the playing field at Messer Street Grounds in Providence. The shooter, James Murphy, was actually aiming for Mulvey's teammate, Cliff Carroll after Carroll had drenched Murphy with a hose. Within a month, Mulvey would be sold to the Philadelphia Quakers.

=== July–September ===
- July 3 – The Chicago White Stockings set a major league record with 14 doubles, including 4 each by Cap Anson and Abner Dalrymple, in a 31–7 pasting over the Buffalo Bisons. Chicago also set a Major League record for the most at bats by one team in a regulation nine-inning game, with 66.
- July 4 – Tim Keefe of the New York Metropolitans wins both games of a double-header over the Columbus Buckeyes while giving up a combined 3 hits in the 2 games.
- July 25 – Charles Radbourn throws a no-hitter for the Providence Grays.
- July 26 – Joe Gephardt of the Louisville Eclipse is forced out of action due to temporary paralysis. Gephardt will recover and play again within 2 weeks.
- July 28 – The first recorded game is played in Hawaii.
- July 30 – Player/manager Lon Knight of the American Association Philadelphia Athletics hits for the cycle. Philadelphia defeats the Pittsburgh Alleghenys, 17–4.
- August 7 – The Providence Grays fall out of 1st place for good in their 6–4 loss to the Boston Beaneaters. For the 2nd straight season, Providence will lead the league for the majority of the season and not win the pennant.
- August 11
  - The Boston Beaneaters turn a triple play when catcher Mike Hines catches a muffed pop-up and catches the base-runners off guard.
  - Fred Thayer, patent-holder for the invention of the catching mask, and George Wright sue Wright's former teammate Albert Spalding's sporting goods company for patent infringement. Spalding will ultimately be forced to pay Thayer royalties in the case.
- August 20 – The Pittsburgh Alleghenys fine George Creamer, Mike Mansell and Billy Taylor $100 each and indefinitely suspend all 3 players for drunkenness.
- August 21 – The Providence Grays defeat the Philadelphia Quakers 28–0 in the most lopsided shutout game in major league history.
- August 29 – John Stricker of the Philadelphia Athletics gets 4 hits in a game against the Louisville Eclipse but sets a record by getting picked off 3 times by Eclipse pitcher Guy Hecker. Benny Kauff of the New York Giants will tie Stricker's record in 1916.
- September 6 – The Chicago White Stockings set a major league record by scoring 18 runs in the 7th inning in their 26–6 victory over the Detroit Wolverines. Tom Burns goes 3–3 with 2 doubles and a home run in the outburst, setting records for most extra-base hits and runs scored in one inning by a player.
- September 10 – Long John Reilly of the Cincinnati Red Stockings hits 2 inside the park home runs in a 12–6 win.
- September 12
  - The Union Association is officially formed in Pittsburgh
  - Long John Reilly hits for the cycle and collects 6 hits in all, while teammate Hick Carpenter also garners 6 hits, as the Cincinnati Red Stockings pound the Pittsburgh Alleghenys 27–5.
- September 13 – Hugh Daily of the Cleveland Blues pitches a no-hitter.
- September 19 – Long John Reilly hits for the cycle for the 2nd time in a week as the Cincinnati Red Stockings beat the Philadelphia Athletics 12–3.
- September 27 – The Boston Red Stockings clinch the National League pennant with a 4–1 win over the Cleveland Blues.
- September 28 – The Philadelphia Athletics clinch the American Association flag with a 7–6 victory over the Louisville Eclipse.

=== October–December ===
- November 22 – New York Gothams owner John B. Day proposes a resolution to prohibit a team from signing a player who has broken the reserve clause of his contract. This resolution, eventually adopted by both the American Association and National League, effectively changes the reserve clause from a device to protect owners from their own greediness to a vindictive weapon to be used against uncooperative players.
- November 24 – The American Association agree to expand to 12 teams by admitting the Brooklyn Atlantics, Indianapolis Hoosiers, Toledo Blue Stockings and Washington Nationals.

== Births ==
=== January–March ===
- January 1 – Eddie Zimmerman
- January 3 – Buck Hopkins
- January 8 – Bob Ingersoll
- January 27 – John McDonald
- February 2 – Bill Abstein
- February 4 – Doc Miller
- February 5 – Dick Scott
- February 8 – Joe Cassidy
- February 13
  - Hal Chase
  - Harl Maggert
- February 19 – Harry Curtis
- February 25 – Jack Hannifin
- March 1 – Charlie Pickett
- March 4 – Chet Spencer
- March 10 – Glenn Liebhardt
- March 17 – Oscar Stanage
- March 20 – Pep Clark
- March 29 – Rube Dessau

=== April–June ===
- April 4
  - Bill Hinchman
  - John Hummel
- April 7 – Bill Cooney
- April 8 – Shag Shaughnessy
- April 10 – Tex Pruiett
- April 13 – Mike Simon
- April 22 – Carl Vandagrift
- April 25 – Russ Ford
- April 28 – Harry Gaspar
- April 29
  - Rube Manning
  - Amby McConnell
  - Bill McGilvray
- May 5 – Gene Curtis
- May 6 – Ed Karger
- May 13 – Jimmy Archer
- May 19 – Eddie Files
- May 21 – Eddie Grant
- May 25 – Heinie Heitmuller
- June 6 – Jim St. Vrain
- June 10 – Ernie Lindemann
- June 16
  - Al Mattern
  - Red Waller
- June 29 – Doc Martel

=== July–September ===
- July 5
  - Jack Quinn
  - Josh Swindell
- July 8 – Ducky Holmes
- July 9 – Dave Shean
- July 14 – Happy Smith
- July 21 – Larry Pape
- July 27 – Harry Kane
- July 31
  - Tommy Madden
  - Red Munson
  - Tuffy Stewart
- August 4 – Lew Moren
- August 7 – Tom Richardson
- August 14 – Bill O'Hara
- August 17 – Walt Justis
- August 19 – George Ferguson
- August 21 – Chief Wilson
- August 23
  - Red Downs
  - Lew Richie
- August 25 – Elmer Brown
- August 27 – Baldy Louden
- August 29 – Jimmie Savage
- August 30
  - Bill Brinker
  - Sam Edmonston
- August 31 – Syd Smith
- September 3 – Art Fromme
- September 5 – Lefty Leifield
- September 6 – Dick Bayless
- September 7 – John Flynn
- September 17 – Leo Hafford
- September 18 – Frank Manush
- September 21 – Bris Lord
- September 28 – Harley Young

=== October–December ===
- October 3 – Phil Reardon
- October 4 – Harry Ables
- October 6 – Red Morgan
- October 7
  - Al Burch
  - Phil Lewis
- October 12 – Charlie French
- October 13
  - Walter Blair
  - Harry Huston
- October 16
  - Lew Groh
  - Will Harridge
- October 19 – Walt Miller
- October 20 – Cuke Barrows
- October 22 – Bill Carrigan
- October 28 – Frank Lange
- October 29 – Del Mason
- November 3 – Ed Lennox
- November 5 – Otis Johnson
- November 11 – Harry Billiard
- November 16 – Rollie Zeider
- November 20
  - Ben Egan
  - Harry Welchonce
- November 26 – Frank Lobert
- November 28 – Fred Osborn
- November 30 – Ben Houser
- December 4 – Jim Moroney
- December 8 – Jimmy Wacker
- December 10
  - Jerry Upp
  - Jim Stephens
- December 17 – Rebel Oakes
- December 18 – Hub Knolls
- December 26 – Jimmy O'Rourke

Date of birth unknown

- Mike McCormick
- Bill Moriarty

== Deaths ==
- April 17 – John Bergh, 25, back-up catcher for the 1880 Boston Red Stockings.
- July 5 – Charlie Guth, 27?, pitched a complete game victory in his only major league game in 1880 for the Chicago White Stockings.
- September 21 – Dan Collins, 29, outfielder who played in 10 games from 1874 to 1876.
- October 10 – Jim Devlin, 34, pitcher for the Louisville Grays in 1876–1877 who led NL in games, innings, starts and strikeouts in its first season; expelled from baseball in the 1877 Louisville Grays scandal

== See also ==
- 1882 in baseball
- 1884 in baseball
- 1885 in baseball
