= Worcester Worcesters all-time roster =

List of baseball players

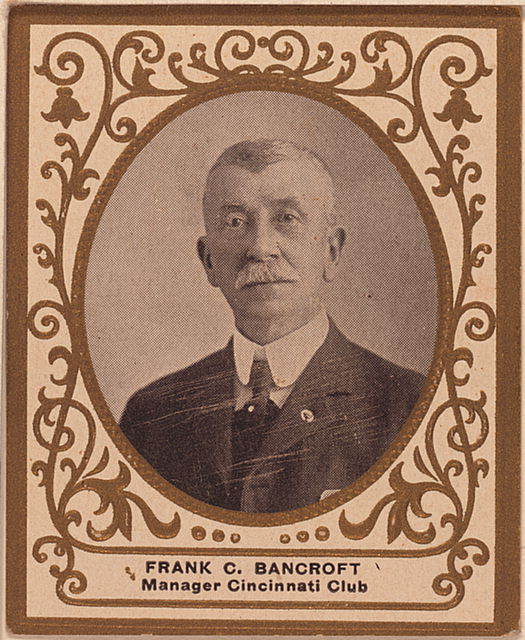
Frank Bancroft managed the Worcester team in 1879 and 1880.

The Worcester Worcesters, sometimes referred to as the Brown Stockings or the Ruby Legs, were a Major League Baseball team based in Worcester, Massachusetts. Though the team's alternate names appear in many modern sources, no contemporary records from the time exist that support the use of names other than "Worcester". They existed in the National League (NL) from 1880 to 1882, and played their home games at the Worcester Agricultural Fairgrounds.

The team was organized in 1879 as the Worcester Baseball Association, and joined the minor league National Association. The team was profitable, successful against rival teams, and did well against NL teams in exhibition games. After the season, team management turned their attention on the NL, and pursued the slot vacated by the departing Syracuse Stars. The team was voted into the NL by a majority of the owners, and in 1880, the team began their first season. The manager of the team, Frank Bancroft, and many of the players stayed with the team when it joined the NL, including pitchers Lee Richmond and Tricky Nichols, and position players Arthur Irwin, Doc Bushong, Charlie Bennett, and Chub Sullivan. On June 12, Richmond threw the first perfect game in major league history, against the Cleveland Blues. Harry Stovey, in his first major league season, led the league in triples and home runs. However, the Ruby Legs were, in turn, no-hit on August 20 by Pud Galvin of the Buffalo Bisons, becoming the first team to be no-hit at home. They played 85 games in their first season, and had a win–loss record of 40 wins, 43 losses, with 2 ties, finishing fifth in the league.

Before the 1881 season, the Worcester team experienced several setbacks. Bancroft departed as their manager, and many of the players also left the team. Mike Dorgan replaced Bancroft and served as player-manager, while Hick Carpenter and Pete Hotaling were brought in as player replacements. Further complications arose during the season: the popular Sullivan was sick with tuberculosis, and on August 19, shortstop Irwin broke his leg. This presented a problem for that day's game, because his backup, Buttercup Dickerson, was also injured at the time. As a solution, local sports equipment dealer Martin "Flip" Flaherty was used to help field a full team. Matters did not improve the following month: Lip Pike was accused of conspiring to throw baseball games, and was later expelled by the NL, and Sullivan succumbed to tuberculosis. To commemorate their teammate, the team wore a black crape on their sleeve, which began baseball's tradition of honoring the recently deceased in this manner. Dorgan departed the team before the season ended, and Stovey took over the on-field managerial duties, while also continuing his playing role. The team finished with a record of 32 wins, 50 losses, with 1 tie, finishing last among the eight teams in the league.

In 1882, the team's decline continued, and the pitchers began to complain of exhaustion and accused management of overuse. A second consecutive last-place finish, along with declining talent, their fans stopped attending home games, with attendance numbers averaging 50 paid spectators. John Clarkson, who went on to win 328 games in a 12-season career, and was the only Hall of Famer to have played for the franchise, began his career for the 1881 Ruby Legs. When the season ended, the NL decided to drop the team from the league, replacing them with the Philadelphia Quakers, who later became the Phillies.

== Keys ==
Abbreviations
Name	Name of the player by official records
Position	Position that player played in the field
Seasons played	The seasons played for this franchise by the player
†	Elected to the Baseball Hall of Fame
§	Indicates that player was a player-manager

Position
C	Catcher	1B	First baseman
2B	Second baseman	3B	Third baseman
SS	Shortstop	IF	Infielder
LF	Left fielder	CF	Center fielder
RF	Right fielder	OF	Outfielder
SP	Starting pitcher	RP	Relief pitcher

== Players ==
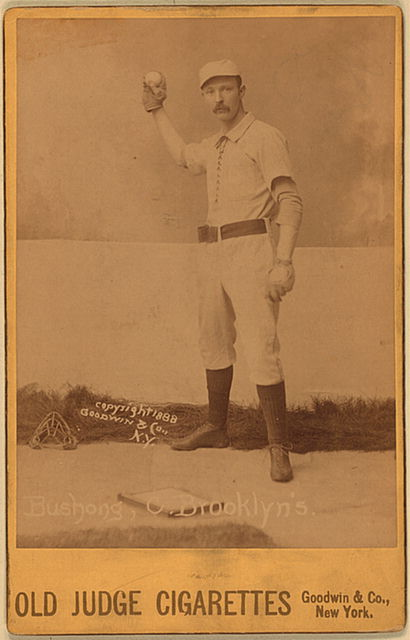
Doc Bushong split time at catcher in Worcester's first season, but became the starter for the final two.

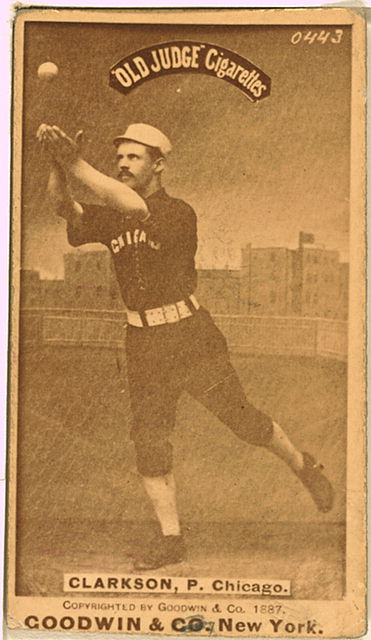
John Clarkson began his Hall of Fame career with the 1882 Worcester team.

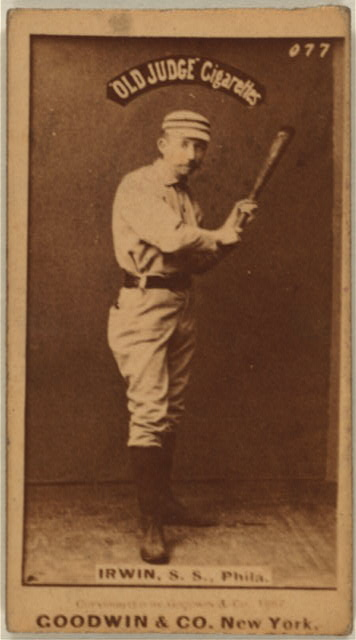
Arthur Irwin was the starting shortstop for the first two seasons, then switch over to third base for most of the 1882 season.

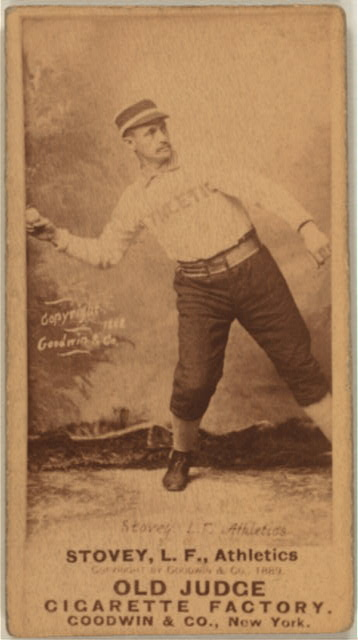
Harry Stovey played in all three of the club's seasons.

Player	Position	Seasons	Notes	Ref
Charlie Bennett	C	1880	He was the starting catcher for the team's inaugural season.	
Tommy Bond^{§}	RF / SP	1882	In 1882, he played eight games, and was a player-manager for six of them.	
Doc Bushong	C	1880–1882	In 1880, he split time as catcher with Charlie Bennett, but became the starter in both 1881 and 1882.	
Hick Carpenter	3B	1881	In his only season with the team, he had a .216 batting average.	
John Clarkson^{†}	SP	1882	He pitched in three games during his first season in the major leagues.	
Jim Clinton	LF	1882	In 1882, he played left field and batted .163 in 26 games. It was his only season with the team	
Ed Cogswell	1B	1882	He batted .137 during the 1882 season, the third and final season of his career.	
Fred Corey	SP / RF	1880–1882	He was a starting pitcher all three seasons, frequently played right field his first two seasons, and played shortstop during his third season.	
George Creamer	2B	1880–1882	He was the starting second baseman for all three seasons.	
Buttercup Dickerson	OF	1880–1881	He was a reserve outfielder in 1880, but started in left field for the 1881 season. He is credited as being the first Italian-American to appear in a major league game.	
Steve Dignan	CF	1880	He played in three games for the Ruby Legs during his only season in the major leagues.	
Jerry Dorgan	RF	1880	He played in 10 games during his first season in the major leagues. He was the brother of Mike Dorgan.	
Mike Dorgan^{§}	1B / RF	1881	In a reserve role, he played in 51 games for the 1881 team. He was the brother of Jerry Dorgan.	
Joe Ellick	3B	1880	In five games, he had one hit in eighteen at bats, for a .056 batting average.	
Jake Evans	RF	1882	In 1882, he led the league in outfield assists, with 31.	
Martin Flaherty	OF	1881	Nicknamed "Flip", he was the owner of a local sporting goods retailer who, due to injuries, came out of the stands to play, and he struck out in two at bats. It was the only major league game in which he appeared.	
Billy Geer	RF / SS	1880	In 1880, he went hitless in six at bats.	
Jim Halpin	3B	1882	He went hitless in eight at bats in 1882, his first season in the majors.	
Jackie Hayes	CF / C	1882	As a rookie in 1882, he was the starting center fielder, and batted .270 in 78 games.	
Pete Hotaling	CF	1881	He batted .309 as the team's starting center fielder in 1881.	
Arthur Irwin	SS / 3B	1880–1882	He played in all three seasons, usually as the starting shortstop, with the Ruby Legs. He was the brother of John Irwin, who played for this franchise in 1882.	
John Irwin	1B	1882	Irwin played in one game for the Ruby Legs, and went hitless in four at bats. He was the brother of teammate Arthur Irwin.	
Lon Knight	RF	1880	In 1880, he started in right field, and batted .239.	
Fred Mann	3B	1882	In his rookie season, he played in 19 games and had a .234 batting average.	
Harry McCormick	SP	1881	He pitched in nine games during his lone season with the Ruby Legs, and had a win–loss record of 1–8.	
Bill McGunnigle	OF	1881	He played in one game for the Ruby Legs after having played seven that season for the Buffalo Bisons.	
Frank McLaughlin	SS	1882	He played in 15 games, the majority as the reserve shortstop.	
Ed Merrill	3B	1882	He played in two games, and had one hit in eight at bats.	
Frank Mountain	SP	1882	He pitched in 18 games for the Ruby Legs, despite having been loaned to the Philadelphia Athletics of the American Association from May 30 to June 26.	
Candy Nelson	SS	1881	He played in 24 games after having not played in the majors the previous season.	
Tricky Nichols	SP	1880	In 1880, he pitched in two games, and lost both of them.	
Tom O'Brien	LF	1882	In 1882, his first season in the major leagues, he played in 22 games, and had a .202 batting average.	
Dan O'Leary	CF	1882	He played in six games for the Ruby Legs in 1882, and had four hits in 22 at bats.	
Lip Pike	CF	1881	His career had ended after the 1878 season, when in 1881, he joined the Ruby Legs for five games. He is credited as being the first great Jewish baseball player.	
Joseph Quinn	C	1881	He played in two games for the Ruby Legs, as well as one for the Boston Red Caps, in 1881.	
Charlie Reilley	C	1881	He had three hits in eight at bats in two games played for the Ruby Legs in 1881.	
Lee Richmond	SP / RP	1880–1882	He was the Ruby Legs' number one starting pitcher for all three seasons. He won 32 games in 1880, and 25 in 1881, and he threw the major leagues' first perfect game.	
John Smith	1B	1882	In 1882, he played in 19 games in Worcester, but began the season with the Troy Trojans. It was his only season in the major leagues.	
Pop Smith	OF / 2B	1881	In 1881, he played in 11 games for the Ruby Legs, and had 3 hits in 41 at bats.	
Harry Stovey^{§}	OF / 1B	1880–1882	He played in all three Worcester seasons, his first three of his 14-season career. In 1880, he led the NL in triples and home runs.	
Asa Stratton	SS	1881	He had one hit in four at bats in the only major league game in which he appeared.	
Chub Sullivan	1B	1880	He played in 43 games in 1880, which was his last of his three seasons in the major leagues.	
Billy Taylor	RF / SP	1881	He played in 31 games for three teams in 1881, 6 of which were for Worcester.	
Bill Tobin	1B	1880	In the 1880 season, he played in 5 games for Worcester, and 33 more for the Troy Trojans.	
Art Whitney	3B	1880	He was the starting third baseman for Worcester in 1880 season, the first of his 11-season career.	
George Wood	LF	1880	He was the starting left fielder for Worcester in 1880 season, the first of his 13-season career.	
