= 1881 Worcester Worcesters season =

1881 Worcester Worcesters
- League: National League
- Ballpark: Worcester Driving Park Grounds
- City: Worcester, Massachusetts
- Record: 32–50 (.390)
- League place: 8th
- Managers: Mike Dorgan, Harry Stovey

The 1881 Worcester Worcesters finished with a 32–50 record, last place in the National League.

== Regular season ==
=== Season standings ===
National League
Team	W	L	Pct.	GB	Home	Road
Chicago White Stockings	56	28	.667	—	32‍–‍10	24‍–‍18
Providence Grays	47	37	.560	9	23‍–‍20	24‍–‍17
Buffalo Bisons	45	38	.542	10½	25‍–‍16	20‍–‍22
Detroit Wolverines	41	43	.488	15	23‍–‍19	18‍–‍24
Troy Trojans	39	45	.464	17	24‍–‍18	15‍–‍27
Boston Red Caps	38	45	.458	17½	19‍–‍22	19‍–‍23
Cleveland Blues	36	48	.429	20	20‍–‍22	16‍–‍26
Worcester Worcesters	32	50	.390	23	19‍–‍22	13‍–‍28

=== Record vs. opponents ===
1881 National League record Sources:
Team	BSN	BUF	CHI	CLE	DET	PRO	TRO	WOR
Boston	—	4–8	2–10	8–4	4–8	5–7	7–5	8–3
Buffalo	8–4	—	5–7	7–5	9–3	7–5	3–9	6–5
Chicago	10–2	7–5	—	6–6	7–5	9–3	8–4	9–3
Cleveland	4–8	5–7	6–6	—	5–7	3–9	6–6–1	7–5
Detroit	8–4	3–9	5–7	7–5	—	4–8	7–5	7–5
Providence	7–5	5–7	3–9	9–3	8–4	—	6–6	9–3
Troy	5–7	9–3	4–8	6–6–1	5–7	6–6	—	4–8
Worcester	3–8	5–6	3–9	5–7	5–7	3–9	8–4	—

=== Roster ===
1881 Worcester Worcesters
Roster
Pitchers: Harry McCormick; Lee Richmond; Catchers: Doc Bushong; Joe Quinn; Charlie Reilley	Infielders: Hick Carpenter; George Creamer; Mike Dorgan; Arthur Irwin; Candy Nelson; Harry Stovey; Asa Stratton	Outfielders: Fred Corey; Buttercup Dickerson; Martin Flaherty; Pete Hotaling; Lip Pike; Pop Smith; Billy Taylor	Manager: Mike Dorgan; Harry Stovey

== Player stats ==
=== Batting ===
==== Starters by position ====
Note: Pos = Position; G = Games played; AB = At bats; H = Hits; Avg. = Batting average; HR = Home runs; RBI = Runs batted in

Pos	Player	G	AB	H	Avg.	HR	RBI
C	Doc Bushong	76	275	64	.233	0	21
1B	Harry Stovey	75	341	92	.270	2	30
2B	George Creamer	80	309	64	.207	0	25
3B	Hick Carpenter	83	347	75	.216	2	31
SS	Arthur Irwin	50	206	55	.267	0	24
OF	Buttercup Dickerson	80	367	116	.316	1	31
OF	Pete Hotaling	77	317	98	.309	1	35
OF	Fred Corey	51	203	45	.222	0	10

==== Other batters ====
Note: G = Games played; AB = At bats; H = Hits; Avg. = Batting average; HR = Home runs; RBI = Runs batted in

Player	G	AB	H	Avg.	HR	RBI
Mike Dorgan	51	220	61	.277	0	18
Candy Nelson	24	103	29	.282	1	15
Pop Smith	11	41	3	.073	0	2
Billy Taylor	6	28	3	.107	0	2
Lip Pike	5	18	2	.111	0	0
Charlie Reilley	2	8	3	.375	0	1
Joe Quinn	2	7	1	.143	0	1
Asa Stratton	1	4	1	.250	0	0
Martin Flaherty	1	2	0	.000	0	0

=== Pitching ===
==== Starting pitchers ====
Note: G = Games pitched; IP = Innings pitched; W = Wins; L = Losses; ERA = Earned run average; SO = Strikeouts

Player	G	IP	W	L	ERA	SO
Lee Richmond	53	462.1	25	26	3.39	156
Fred Corey	23	188.2	6	15	3.72	33
Harry McCormick	9	78.1	1	8	3.56	7
Billy Taylor	1	8.0	0	1	7.88	0
