= 1881 Detroit Wolverines season =

1881 Detroit Wolverines
- League: National League
- Ballpark: Recreation Park
- City: Detroit, Michigan
- Record: 41–43 (.488)
- League place: 4th
- Owner: William G. Thompson
- Manager: Frank Bancroft

In 1881, Detroit Mayor William G. Thompson bought most of the players from the defunct Cincinnati Reds franchise and formed the Detroit Wolverines, which joined the National League. The team finished the season with a 41–43 record, good enough for fourth place in the NL race.

== Regular season ==
=== Season standings ===
National League
Team	W	L	Pct.	GB	Home	Road
Chicago White Stockings	56	28	.667	—	32‍–‍10	24‍–‍18
Providence Grays	47	37	.560	9	23‍–‍20	24‍–‍17
Buffalo Bisons	45	38	.542	10½	25‍–‍16	20‍–‍22
Detroit Wolverines	41	43	.488	15	23‍–‍19	18‍–‍24
Troy Trojans	39	45	.464	17	24‍–‍18	15‍–‍27
Boston Red Caps	38	45	.458	17½	19‍–‍22	19‍–‍23
Cleveland Blues	36	48	.429	20	20‍–‍22	16‍–‍26
Worcester Worcesters	32	50	.390	23	19‍–‍22	13‍–‍28

=== Record vs. opponents ===
1881 National League record Sources:
Team	BSN	BUF	CHI	CLE	DET	PRO	TRO	WOR
Boston	—	4–8	2–10	8–4	4–8	5–7	7–5	8–3
Buffalo	8–4	—	5–7	7–5	9–3	7–5	3–9	6–5
Chicago	10–2	7–5	—	6–6	7–5	9–3	8–4	9–3
Cleveland	4–8	5–7	6–6	—	5–7	3–9	6–6–1	7–5
Detroit	8–4	3–9	5–7	7–5	—	4–8	7–5	7–5
Providence	7–5	5–7	3–9	9–3	8–4	—	6–6	9–3
Troy	5–7	9–3	4–8	6–6–1	5–7	6–6	—	4–8
Worcester	3–8	5–6	3–9	5–7	5–7	3–9	8–4	—

=== Roster ===
1881 Detroit Wolverines
Roster
Pitchers: George Derby; Frank Mountain; Tony Mullane; Stump Weidman; Will White; Catchers: Charlie Bennett; Charlie Reilley; Sam Trott	Infielders: George Bradley; Lew Brown; Will Foley; Joe Gerhardt; Sadie Houck; Mike Moynahan; Martin Powell; Dan Stearns; Billy Taylor; Dasher Troy; Art Whitney; Sam Wise	Outfielders: Mike Dorgan; Ned Hanlon; Lon Knight; Jack Leary; Dan O'Leary; George Wood	Manager: Frank Bancroft

== Player stats ==
=== Batting ===
==== Starters by position ====
Note: Pos = Position; G = Games played; AB = At bats; H = Hits; Avg. = Batting average; HR = Home runs; RBI = Runs batted in

Pos	Player	G	AB	H	Avg.	HR	RBI
C	Charlie Bennett	76	299	90	.301	7	64
1B	Martin Powell	55	219	74	.338	1	38
2B	Joe Gerhardt	80	297	72	.242	0	36
3B	Art Whitney	58	214	39	.182	0	9
SS	Sadie Houck	75	308	86	.279	1	36
OF	Lon Knight	83	340	92	.271	1	52
OF	George Wood	80	337	100	.297	2	32
OF	Ned Hanlon	76	305	85	.279	2	28

==== Other batters ====
Note: G = Games played; AB = At bats; H = Hits; Avg. = Batting average; HR = Home runs; RBI = Runs batted in

Player	G	AB	H	Avg.	HR	RBI
Lew Brown	27	108	26	.241	3	14
Charlie Reilley	19	70	12	.171	0	3
Dasher Troy	11	44	15	.341	0	4
Mike Dorgan	8	34	8	.235	0	5
Sam Trott	6	25	5	.200	0	2
Will Foley	5	15	2	.133	0	1
Jack Leary	3	11	3	.273	0	4
Dan Stearns	3	11	1	.091	0	0
Dan O'Leary	2	8	0	.000	0	0
George Bradley	1	4	0	.000	0	0
Mike Moynahan	1	4	1	.250	0	0
Billy Taylor	1	4	2	.500	0	1
Sam Wise	1	4	2	.500	0	0

=== Pitching ===
==== Starting pitchers ====
Note: G = Games pitched; IP = Innings pitched; W = Wins; L = Losses; ERA = Earned run average; SO = Strikeouts

Player	G	IP	W	L	ERA	SO
George Derby	56	494.2	29	26	2.20	212
Stump Weidman	13	115.0	8	5	1.80	26
Frank Mountain	7	60.0	3	4	5.25	13
Tony Mullane	5	44.0	1	4	4.91	7
Will White	2	18.0	0	2	5.00	5
Jack Leary	2	13.0	0	2	4.15	2
