= 1881 Cleveland Blues season =

1881 Cleveland Blues
- League: National League
- Ballpark: Kennard Street Park
- City: Cleveland, Ohio
- Record: 36–48 (.429)
- League place: 7th
- Managers: Mike McGeary, John Clapp

The 1881 Cleveland Blues finished the season at 36–48, seventh place in the National League.

== Regular season ==
=== Season standings ===
National League
Team	W	L	Pct.	GB	Home	Road
Chicago White Stockings	56	28	.667	—	32‍–‍10	24‍–‍18
Providence Grays	47	37	.560	9	23‍–‍20	24‍–‍17
Buffalo Bisons	45	38	.542	10½	25‍–‍16	20‍–‍22
Detroit Wolverines	41	43	.488	15	23‍–‍19	18‍–‍24
Troy Trojans	39	45	.464	17	24‍–‍18	15‍–‍27
Boston Red Caps	38	45	.458	17½	19‍–‍22	19‍–‍23
Cleveland Blues	36	48	.429	20	20‍–‍22	16‍–‍26
Worcester Worcesters	32	50	.390	23	19‍–‍22	13‍–‍28

=== Record vs. opponents ===
1881 National League record Sources:
Team	BSN	BUF	CHI	CLE	DET	PRO	TRO	WOR
Boston	—	4–8	2–10	8–4	4–8	5–7	7–5	8–3
Buffalo	8–4	—	5–7	7–5	9–3	7–5	3–9	6–5
Chicago	10–2	7–5	—	6–6	7–5	9–3	8–4	9–3
Cleveland	4–8	5–7	6–6	—	5–7	3–9	6–6–1	7–5
Detroit	8–4	3–9	5–7	7–5	—	4–8	7–5	7–5
Providence	7–5	5–7	3–9	9–3	8–4	—	6–6	9–3
Troy	5–7	9–3	4–8	6–6–1	5–7	6–6	—	4–8
Worcester	3–8	5–6	3–9	5–7	5–7	3–9	8–4	—

=== Roster ===
1881 Cleveland Blues
Roster
Pitchers: Jim McCormick; The Only Nolan; Catchers: John Clapp; Rudy Kemmler; Doc Kennedy; Phil Powers	Infielders: George Bradley; Herm Doscher; Fred Dunlap; Jack Glasscock; Mike McGeary; Bill Phillips; Pop Smith	Outfielders: Mike Moynahan; Blondie Purcell; Jack Remsen; Orator Shafer; Billy Taylor	Manager: John Clapp; Mike McGeary

== Player stats ==
=== Batting ===
==== Starters by position ====
Note: Pos = Position; G = Games played; AB = At bats; H = Hits; Avg. = Batting average; HR = Home runs; RBI = Runs batted in

Pos	Player	G	AB	H	Avg.	HR	RBI
C	John Clapp	68	261	66	.253	0	25
1B	Bill Phillips	85	357	97	.272	1	44
2B	Fred Dunlap	80	351	114	.325	3	24
3B	George Bradley	60	241	60	.249	2	18
SS	Jack Glasscock	85	335	86	.257	0	33
OF	Orator Shafer	85	343	88	.257	1	34
OF	Jack Remsen	48	172	30	.174	0	13
OF	Mike Moynahan	33	135	31	.230	0	8

==== Other batters ====
Note: G = Games played; AB = At bats; H = Hits; Avg. = Batting average; HR = Home runs; RBI = Runs batted in

Player	G	AB	H	Avg.	HR	RBI
Doc Kennedy	39	150	47	.313	0	15
Billy Taylor	24	103	25	.243	0	12
Blondie Purcell	20	80	14	.175	0	4
Mike McGeary	11	41	9	.220	0	5
Pop Smith	10	34	4	.118	0	3
Herm Doscher	5	19	4	.211	0	0
Phil Powers	5	15	1	.067	0	0
Rudy Kemmler	1	3	0	.000	0	0

=== Pitching ===
==== Starting pitchers ====
Note: G = Games pitched; IP = Innings pitched; W = Wins; L = Losses; ERA = Earned run average; SO = Strikeouts

Player	G	IP	W	L	ERA	SO
Jim McCormick	59	526.0	26	30	2.45	178
The Only Nolan	22	180.0	8	14	3.05	54
George Bradley	6	51.0	2	4	3.88	6

==== Relief pitchers ====
Note: G = Games pitched; W = Wins; L = Losses; SV = Saves; ERA = Earned run average; SO = Strikeouts

Player	G	W	L	SV	ERA	SO
Billy Taylor	1	0	0	0	0.00	2
