= List of Providence Grays managers =

Managers of the Providence Grays

The Providence Grays were a Major League Baseball team that played in Providence, Rhode Island. They played in the National League from 1878 through 1885. During their time as a Major League team, the Grays employed eight different managers. The duties of the team manager include team strategy and leadership on and off the field.

The Grays' first manager was left fielder Tom York. York managed the team in 1878 and led them to a record of 33 wins and 27 losses. York also managed the Grays for part of the 1881 season, and in total managed the Grays for 96 games, with 56 wins and 37 losses, for a winning percentage of .602. In their second season, the Grays were managed by shortstop and Baseball Hall of Fameer George Wright. Wright led the team to a record of 59 wins and 25 losses for a winning percentage of .702 in 1879, winning the National League pennant. Wright left the team to join the Boston Red Caps, managed by his brother Harry Wright in 1880. In 1880 and 1881 the Grays employed a total of five different managers, including York's second term and 32 games managed by Hall of Famer John Montgomery Ward.

In 1882, Hall of Famer Harry Wright, George Wright's brother, became the Grays manager, and George Wright rejoined the team as their shortstop. Harry Wright managed the team for two seasons, winning 110 games and losing 72. Frank Bancroft became the Grays' manager in 1884 and managed the team to record of 84 wins and 28 losses and a winning percentage of .750, winning the Grays' second National League pennant behind the strength of Charles Radbourn's record 59 pitching victories. The Grays also won the World Series in 1884; however the 19th century World Series was a very different event from the current World Series, which began in 1903. The 19th century World Series was considered an exhibition contest between the champion of the National League and the champion of the American Association. The Grays defeated the American Association champion New York Metropolitans in the 1884 World Series winning three games and losing none. Bancroft managed the team again for their final season as a Major League team in 1885 with less success. Bancroft finished with an overall managerial record with the Grays of 137 wins and 85 losses, for a winning percentage of .617.

Bancroft managed the most games in Grays' history, 224, and his 137 wins and 85 losses are also the most in Grays' history. George Wright has the highest winning percentage of any Grays' manager, with .702. Three Grays' managers, Ward and the Wright brothers, were elected to Baseball's Hall of Fame.

== Table key ==
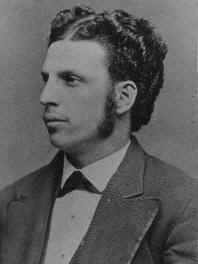
George Wright was one of two Wright brothers to manage the Grays, and led the Grays to the 1879 National League pennant.

| # | A running total of the number of Grays' managers. Any manager who has two or more separate terms is only counted once. |
| G | Number of regular season games managed; may not equal sum of wins and losses due to tie games |
| W | Number of regular season wins in games managed |
| L | Number of regular season losses in games managed |
| WPct | Winning percentage: number of wins divided by number of games managed |
| PA | Playoff appearances: number of years this manager has led the franchise to the playoffs |
| PW | Playoff wins: number of wins this manager has accrued in the playoffs |
| PL | Playoff losses: number of losses this manager has accrued in the playoffs |
| LC | League Championships: number of League Championships, or pennants, achieved by the manager |
| WS | World Series: number of World Series victories achieved by the manager |
| † | Elected to the National Baseball Hall of Fame |

== Managers ==
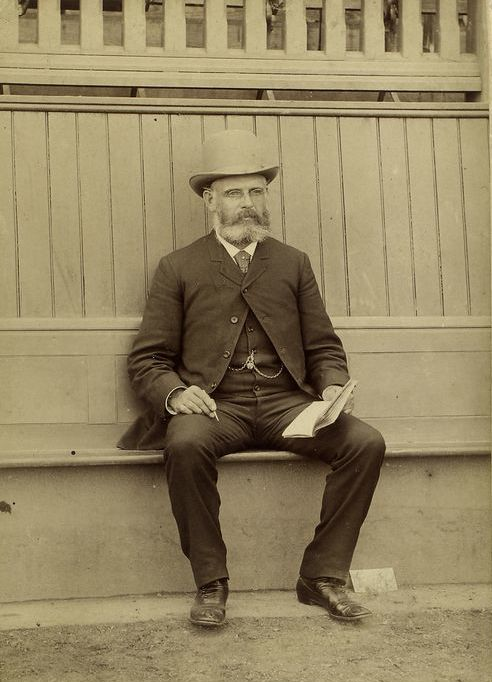
Harry Wright, George's brother, managed the Grays in 1882 and 1883.

| # | Image | Manager | Seasons | G | W | L | WPct | PA | PW | PL | LC | WS | Ref |
|---|---|---|---|---|---|---|---|---|---|---|---|---|---|
| 1 | | Tom York | 1878 | 62 | 33 | 27 | .550 | — | — | — | — | — | |
| 2 | | George Wright^{†} | 1879 | 85 | 59 | 25 | .702 | — | — | — | 1 | — | |
| 3 | | Mike McGeary | 1880 | 16 | 8 | 7 | .533 | — | — | — | — | — | |
| 4 | | John Montgomery Ward^{†} | 1880 | 32 | 18 | 13 | .581 | — | — | — | — | — | |
| 5 | | Mike Dorgan | 1880 | 39 | 26 | 12 | .684 | — | — | — | — | — | |
| 6 | | Jack Farrell | 1881 | 51 | 24 | 27 | .471 | — | — | — | — | — | |
| — | | Tom York | 1881 | 34 | 23 | 10 | .697 | — | — | — | — | — | |
| 7 | | Harry Wright^{†} | 1882–1883 | 182 | 110 | 72 | .604 | — | — | — | — | — | |
| 8 | | Frank Bancroft | 1884–1885 | 224 | 137 | 85 | .617 | 1 | 3 | 0 | 1 | 1^{[a]} | |

== Footnotes ==
- ^{a} Although the Grays won the tournament called the World Series in 1884, the 19th century World Series was a very different event from the current World Series, which began in 1903. The 19th century World Series was considered an exhibition contest between the champion of the National League and the champion of the American Association. The Grays defeated the New York Metropolitans in the 1884 World Series winning all three games.
