= James Sumner =

James Sumner may refer to:

- James Sumner (baseball) (1851–1881), American baseball umpire
- James Sumner (soldier) (1840–1912), United States Army soldier and a recipient of the Medal of Honor
- James B. Sumner (1887–1955), American chemist who shared the Nobel Prize in Chemistry
- James Edward (Red) Sumner Jr. (born 1948), stellar occultation astronomer after whom asteroid 36983 Sumner is named
