= 1881 Major League Baseball season =

1881 MLB season
- League: National League (NL)
- Sport: Baseball
- Duration: April 30 – September 30, 1881
- Games: 84
- Teams: 8

Pennant winner
- NL champions: Chicago White Stockings
- NL runners-up: Providence Grays

MLB seasons
- ← 1880 1882 →

Locations of teams for the 1881 National League season
National League

The 1881 major league baseball season was contested from April 30 through September 30, 1881, and saw the Chicago White Stockings as the pennant winner of the sixth season of the National League. There was no postseason.

The 1881 season is most known for featuring the first major league grand slam. (Note: Charlie Gould of the 1871 Boston Red Stockings of the National Association (NA) hit a grand slam, the NA is not considered a major league by Major League Baseball.) Roger Connor of the Troy Trojans hit the walk-off home run at Riverside Park (Greenbush) against the Worcester Worcesters on September 10, leading to an 8–7 victory.

Over the off-season, the National League dropped the Cincinnati Stars because the team refused to sign a league pledge that banned alcohol in league parks and forbade clubs from renting their parks out on Sundays. The team was replaced by the Detroit Wolverines.

1881 would be the final season of the first National League monopoly-era, as the American Association would be established in 1882.

== Schedule ==
The 1881 schedule consisted of 84 games for all eight teams of the National League. Each team was scheduled to play 12 games against the other seven teams in the league. This continued the format put in place since 1879 and would be used until 1883.

Opening Day took place on April 30 featuring four teams. The final day of the season was on September 30, featuring all eight teams.

== Rule changes ==
The 1881 season saw the following rule changes:

- The pitching distance from the front of the pitcher's box to the center of home base from 45 feet to 50 feet.
- The number of "fair balls" the batter could choose to take without lowering the number of "unfair balls" in a base on balls was reduced from four to three.
- Temporary substitute runners were prohibited.
- Runners were now required to return to their occupied base or risk being putout:
  - Before the umpire called time on any play.
  - When a foul ball was not ruled an out and returned to the pitcher.
- Umpires must now use their best judgement on the legitimacy of a catch by a fielder, whereas previously, an umpire could take the testimony of bystanders nearest the player attempting the catch to make his decision.

== Teams ==
An asterisk (*) denotes the ballpark a team played the minority of their home games at

League	Team	City	Ballpark	Capacity	Manager
National League	Boston Red Caps	Boston, Massachusetts	South End Grounds	3,000	Harry Wright
National League	Buffalo Bisons	Buffalo, New York	Riverside Park (Buffalo)	Unknown	Jim O'Rourke
National League	Chicago White Stockings	Chicago, Illinois	Lakefront Park	5,000	Cap Anson
National League	Cleveland Blues	Cleveland, Ohio	National League Park	Unknown	Mike McGeary
National League	Cleveland Blues	Cleveland, Ohio	National League Park	Unknown	John Clapp
National League	Detroit Wolverines	Detroit, Michigan	Recreation Park	Unknown	Frank Bancroft
National League	Providence Grays	Providence, Rhode Island	Messer Street Grounds	6,000	Jack Farrell
National League	Providence Grays	Providence, Rhode Island	Messer Street Grounds	6,000	Tom York
National League	Troy Trojans	Lansingburgh, New York	Haymakers' Grounds	Unknown	Bob Ferguson
National League	Troy Trojans	Greenbush, New York	Riverside Park (Greenbush)*	Unknown*	Bob Ferguson
National League	Worcester Worcesters	Worcester, Massachusetts	Agricultural County Fair Grounds	Unknown	Mike Dorgan
National League	Worcester Worcesters	Worcester, Massachusetts	Agricultural County Fair Grounds	Unknown	Harry Stovey

1. In today's Troy, New York.
2. In today's Rensselaer, New York.

== Standings ==
=== National League ===
National League
Team	W	L	Pct.	GB	Home	Road
Chicago White Stockings	56	28	.667	—	32‍–‍10	24‍–‍18
Providence Grays	47	37	.560	9	23‍–‍20	24‍–‍17
Buffalo Bisons	45	38	.542	10½	25‍–‍16	20‍–‍22
Detroit Wolverines	41	43	.488	15	23‍–‍19	18‍–‍24
Troy Trojans	39	45	.464	17	24‍–‍18	15‍–‍27
Boston Red Caps	38	45	.458	17½	19‍–‍22	19‍–‍23
Cleveland Blues	36	48	.429	20	20‍–‍22	16‍–‍26
Worcester Worcesters	32	50	.390	23	19‍–‍22	13‍–‍28

=== Tie games ===
Two tie games, which are not factored into winning percentage or games behind occurred throughout the season (though standings were determined by total wins, not winning percentage).

The Cleveland Blues, Providence Grays, Troy Trojans, and Worcester Worcesters had one tie game each.

- August 18, Providence Grays vs. Worcester Worcesters, tied at 8.
- September 15, Cleveland Blues vs. Troy Trojans, tied at 6.

== Managerial changes ==
=== Off-season ===
Team	Former Manager	New Manager
Buffalo Bisons	Sam Crane	Jim O'Rourke
Cincinnati Stars	John Clapp	Team folded
Cleveland Blues	Jim McCormick	Mike McGeary
Providence Grays	Mike Dorgan	Jack Farrell
Worcester Worcesters	Frank Bancroft	Mike Dorgan

=== In-season ===
Team	Former Manager	New Manager
Cleveland Blues	Mike McGeary	John Clapp
Providence Grays	Jack Farrell	Tom York
Worcester Worcesters	Mike Dorgan	Harry Stovey

== League leaders ==
Any team shown in small text indicates a previous team a player was on during the season.

=== National League ===
Hitting leaders
Stat	Player	Total
AVG	Cap Anson (CHI)	.399
OPS	Cap Anson (CHI)	.952
HR	Dan Brouthers (BUF)	8
RBI	Cap Anson (CHI)	82
R	George Gore (CHI)	86
H	Cap Anson (CHI)	137

Pitching leaders
Stat	Player	Total
W	Larry Corcoran (CHI); Jim Whitney (BSN)	31
L	Jim Whitney (BSN)	33
ERA	George Weidman (DET)	1.80
K	George Derby (DET)	212
IP	Jim Whitney (BSN)	552.1
SV	Bobby Mathews (BSN/PRO)	2
WHIP	George Weidman (DET)	1.043

== Milestones ==
=== Batters ===
- George Gore (CHI):
  - Set a Major League record for most stolen bases in a single game, stealing seven bases against the Providence Grays on June 25.

== Venues ==
The Detroit Wolverines join the National League and play at Recreation Park in Detroit, Michigan.

The Troy Trojans would play their final game at Haymakers' Grounds on September 30 against the Detroit Wolverines, moving to the Troy Ball Clubs Grounds for the start of the 1882 season.

The Troy Trojans continue to host a few games at Riverside Park in nearby Greenbush, New York, playing on June 15 and September 10.

== See also ==
- 1881 in baseball (Events, Births, Deaths)
