= 1881 Troy Trojans season =

1881 Troy Trojans
- League: National League
- Ballpark: Haymakers' Grounds
- City: Troy, New York
- Record: 49–45 (.521)
- League place: 5th
- Manager: Bob Ferguson

The 1881 Troy Trojans finished in 5th place in the National League with a 39–45 record.

== Regular season ==
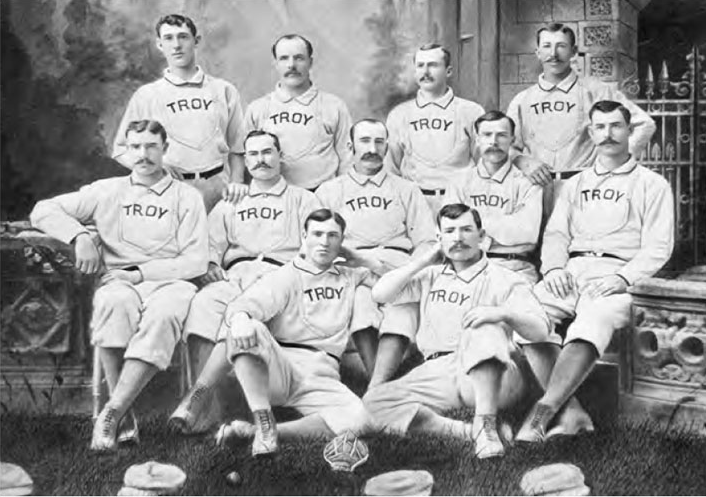
1881 Troy Trojans

=== Season standings ===
National League
Team	W	L	Pct.	GB	Home	Road
Chicago White Stockings	56	28	.667	—	32‍–‍10	24‍–‍18
Providence Grays	47	37	.560	9	23‍–‍20	24‍–‍17
Buffalo Bisons	45	38	.542	10½	25‍–‍16	20‍–‍22
Detroit Wolverines	41	43	.488	15	23‍–‍19	18‍–‍24
Troy Trojans	39	45	.464	17	24‍–‍18	15‍–‍27
Boston Red Caps	38	45	.458	17½	19‍–‍22	19‍–‍23
Cleveland Blues	36	48	.429	20	20‍–‍22	16‍–‍26
Worcester Worcesters	32	50	.390	23	19‍–‍22	13‍–‍28

=== Record vs. opponents ===
1881 National League record Sources:
Team	BSN	BUF	CHI	CLE	DET	PRO	TRO	WOR
Boston	—	4–8	2–10	8–4	4–8	5–7	7–5	8–3
Buffalo	8–4	—	5–7	7–5	9–3	7–5	3–9	6–5
Chicago	10–2	7–5	—	6–6	7–5	9–3	8–4	9–3
Cleveland	4–8	5–7	6–6	—	5–7	3–9	6–6–1	7–5
Detroit	8–4	3–9	5–7	7–5	—	4–8	7–5	7–5
Providence	7–5	5–7	3–9	9–3	8–4	—	6–6	9–3
Troy	5–7	9–3	4–8	6–6–1	5–7	6–6	—	4–8
Worcester	3–8	5–6	3–9	5–7	5–7	3–9	8–4	—

=== Roster ===
1881 Troy Trojans
Roster
Pitchers: Tim Keefe; Mickey Welch	Catchers: Buck Ewing; Bill Holbert; Infielders: Ed Caskin; Roger Connor; Bob Ferguson; Frank Hankinson	Outfielders: John Cassidy; Jake Evans; Pete Gillespie	Manager: Bob Ferguson

== Player stats ==
=== Batting ===
==== Starters by position ====
Note: Pos = Position; G = Games played; AB = At bats; H = Hits; Avg. = Batting average; HR = Home runs; RBI = Runs batted in

Pos	Player	G	AB	H	Avg.	HR	RBI
C	Buck Ewing	67	272	68	.250	0	25
1B	Roger Connor	85	367	107	.292	2	31
2B	Bob Ferguson	85	339	96	.283	1	35
3B	Frank Hankinson	85	321	62	.193	1	19
SS	Ed Caskin	63	234	53	.226	0	21
OF	John Cassidy	85	370	82	.222	1	11
OF	Pete Gillespie	84	348	96	.276	0	41
OF	Jake Evans	83	315	76	.241	0	28

==== Other batters ====
Note: G = Games played; AB = At bats; H = Hits; Avg. = Batting average; HR = Home runs; RBI = Runs batted in

Player	G	AB	H	Avg.	HR	RBI
Bill Holbert	46	180	49	.272	0	14

=== Pitching ===
==== Starting pitchers ====
Note: G = Games pitched; IP = Innings pitched; W = Wins; L = Losses; ERA = Earned run average; SO = Strikeouts

Player	G	IP	W	L	ERA	SO
Tim Keefe	45	402.0	18	27	3.25	103
Mickey Welch	40	368.0	21	18	2.67	104
