= 1881 in baseball =

The following are the baseball events of the year 1881 throughout the world.

== Champions ==
- National League: Chicago White Stockings
- Eastern Championship Association: New York Metropolitans

Inter-league playoff: New York Mets (ECA) defeat Chicago (NL), 2 games to 1.

== Statistical leaders ==
National League
Stat	Player	Total
AVG	Cap Anson (CHI)	.399
HR	Dan Brouthers (BUF)	8
RBI	Cap Anson (CHI)	82
W	Larry Corcoran (CHI); Jim Whitney (BSN)	31
ERA	Stump Weidman (DET)	1.80
K	George Derby (DET)	212

== National League final standings ==
National League
Team	W	L	Pct.	GB	Home	Road
Chicago White Stockings	56	28	.667	—	32‍–‍10	24‍–‍18
Providence Grays	47	37	.560	9	23‍–‍20	24‍–‍17
Buffalo Bisons	45	38	.542	10½	25‍–‍16	20‍–‍22
Detroit Wolverines	41	43	.488	15	23‍–‍19	18‍–‍24
Troy Trojans	39	45	.464	17	24‍–‍18	15‍–‍27
Boston Red Caps	38	45	.458	17½	19‍–‍22	19‍–‍23
Cleveland Blues	36	48	.429	20	20‍–‍22	16‍–‍26
Worcester Worcesters	32	50	.390	23	19‍–‍22	13‍–‍28

Locations of teams for the 1881 National League season
National League

== Events ==
=== January ===
- January 11 – The first of a series of baseball games played on ice is played in Chicago. This will become a regular event in the Chicago area.

=== February ===
- February 7 – The Providence Grays sign Charley Radbourn. Radbourn played for the Buffalo Bisons in 1880, but only played the field in 6 games and did not pitch at all due to an arm injury.
- February 22 – George Wright signs a contract to play for the Boston Red Caps after sitting out the 1880 season. Wright will only play part-time in order to devote more time to his sporting goods business.
- February 25 – Jim O'Rourke signs a contract with the Buffalo Bisons after spending most of his career playing for the Boston Red Caps.

=== March ===
- March 8 – The National League agrees on an 84-game schedule for the upcoming season. The owners are polled and pick the Chicago White Stockings as the pre-season favorite to win the pennant.
- March 9 – The National League releases a list of 23 umpires approved to call league games.

=== April ===
- April 11 – The Eastern Association is formed and includes the New York Metropolitans, the Washington Nationals, and Brooklyn Atlantics, all teams that have regularly played competitively against National League teams.
- April 27 – With pitcher George Bradley already out with pneumonia, the Detroit Wolverines lose their other hurler Bill Sweeney to a pulmonary hemorrhage. Neither pitcher will ever play a single game for the Wolverines.

=== May ===
- May 14 – Charley Jones wins a judgement against the Boston Red Caps for his unpaid salary due from 1880 in an Ohio court. Cleveland law enforcement will take the money from the Red Caps share of gate receipts when Boston plays in Cleveland.
- May 20 – Mike "King" Kelly scores the go-ahead run by cutting short the distance rounding the bases. Kelly doesn't come close to touching third while the umpire is looking a different direction. Kelly then pulls off the hidden ball trick in the 9th inning to preserve the win for the Chicago White Stockings.
- May 28 – A man is arrested for trying to bribe John Clapp of the Cleveland Blues to throw a game. Clapp will acquire the nickname "Honest John" because he went to the police after the bribe offer was made.

=== June ===
- June 1 – Tommy Bond is released by the Boston Red Caps after starting the season 0–3. After averaging nearly 500 innings pitched per season over the last 7 years, Bond's arm is no longer what it once was. Bond will never regain his once-dominating form.
- June 18 – The Washington Nationals of the Eastern League disband, citing lack of interest after being rejected to join the National League.
- June 20 – A new team is formed in Cincinnati after the demise of the previous Cincinnati Reds team. This new club will succeed and become the modern-day Cincinnati Reds.
- June 25 – George Gore of the Chicago White Stockings sets a major league record by stealing 7 bases in one game. Billy Hamilton will tie this record in 1894.

=== July ===
- July 2 – The Boston Red Caps lose to the Buffalo Bisons to drop to last place in the National League. It is the first time in club history that they have occupied the cellar.
- July 4 – Mickey Welch of the Troy Trojans beats the Buffalo Bisons in both games of a double-header, giving him 16 straight wins against the Bisons.
- July 20 – The Buffalo Bisons finish off a sweep of the first-place Chicago White Stockings to pull within 3½ games of Chicago.
- July 21 – The Cleveland Blues lose 4–0 in an exhibition game to Akron in a game that only takes 1 hour and 18 minutes to play.

=== August ===
- August 21 – The Eclipse club refuses to play against the Chicago Whites in Louisville because of a black player named Fleet Walker on the Chicago team. Walker will go on to play for the Toledo Blue Stockings in the American Association in 1884 and is generally regarded as the first black player in major league baseball.
- August 27 – Tony Mullane makes his major league debut for the Detroit Wolverines and beats the first place Chicago White Stockings 9–1. Despite the win, Mullane will be released within a month by the Wolverines. He will go on to post 284 career wins.

=== September ===
- September 3 – Lip Pike of the Worcester Worcesters makes 3 errors in the 9th inning which gives the Boston Red Caps 2 runs and a 3–2 victory. Worcester accuses Pike of throwing the game and immediately suspends him. Pike will only play in 1 more game in his career, in 1887.
- September 10 – With the Troy Trojans trailing 7–4, the bases loaded and two out in the bottom of the 9th, Roger Connor hits the first grand slam in National League history for an 8–7 victory.
- September 12 – Chub Sullivan, who was captain of the Worcester Worcesters before falling ill in the spring, dies in Boston at the age of 25.
- September 15 – Davy Force of the Buffalo Bisons turns 2 unassisted double plays, participates in 2 other double plays and starts a triple play for the Bisons. Despite his feat, Buffalo loses in 12 innings, 7–6 to the Worcester Worcesters.
- September 16 – The Chicago White Stockings win their 2nd straight pennant with a 4–0 win over the Boston Red Caps.
- September 25 – The National League announces that all 8 teams will return for the 1882 season. This is the first time that the major leagues have had the same teams in 2 consecutive seasons.
- September 27 – The Troy Trojans lose to the champion Chicago White Stockings 10–8 in a heavy rain storm in front of 12 spectators, setting a record for the least attended game.
- September 29 – The National League issues a list of 10 blacklisted players who will require unanimous league approval for reinstatement. The reason given for the blacklisting is "confirmed dissipation and general insubordination."

=== October ===
- October 8 – Chris von der Ahe takes control of the St. Louis Browns. The Browns join the soon to be formed American Association, become a dominant team and eventually join the National League and still exist today as the St. Louis Cardinals.
- October 10 – Initiated by backers of the new Cincinnati Red Stockings club, the first meetings are held in Pittsburgh of what would become the American Association.
- October 15 – Denny McKnight organizes the Allegheny Baseball Club of Pittsburgh in anticipation of playing in the new American Association. The team, still in existence today, will become known as the Pittsburgh Pirates.
- October 16 – The Mystics win the California League championship by defeating Oakland 12–10.

=== November ===
- November 2 – The American Association, the first competing Major League, is officially founded with the motto Liberty to All. The six Clubs members are the Brooklyn Atlantics, Cincinnati Red Stockings, Eclipse of Louisville, Philadelphia Athletics, Pittsburgh Alleghenys and St. Louis Brown Stockings. The Brooklyn club will be replaced by the Baltimore Orioles before the start of the first season in 1882.
- November 3 – The American Association elects Denny McKnight as president. The new league will have no reserve clause and will allow Sunday games, liquor sales and 25¢ tickets, all in opposition to National League policies, in an effort to take the established major league head-on.

=== December ===
- December 22 – Longtime Boston Red Stockings/Boston Red Caps manager Harry Wright signs a contract to manage the Providence Grays for the 1882 season.

== Births ==
=== January–April ===
- January 21 – Arch McCarthy
- January 22 – Ira Thomas
- February 2 – Orval Overall
- February 27 – Walter Moser
- February 28 – Terry Turner
- March 1 – Al Shaw
- March 23 – Gavvy Cravath
- April 12 – Harry Ostdiek
- April 22 – Neal Ball

=== May–August ===
- May 14 – Ed Walsh
- May 28 – King Brady
- June 5 – Beany Jacobson
- June 17 – Claude Rossman
- July 6 – Walter Carlisle
- July 6 – Roy Hartzell
- July 18 – Larry McLean
- July 21 – Johnny Evers
- July 31 – Bob Unglaub
- August 22 – Howie Camnitz
- August 28 – Dode Paskert

=== September–December ===
- September 9 – Harry Cross
- September 10 – Tony Tonneman
- October 18 – Hans Lobert
- November 10 – Jack Hoey
- December 20 – Branch Rickey

== Deaths ==
- February 6 – Ham Allen, 34, batted .273 for the 1872 Middletown Mansfields.
- March 1 – Hugh Campbell, 34?, pitcher for the 1873 Elizabeth Resolutes.
- April 11 – John McMullin, 32?, outfielder in the National Association from 1871 to 1875 who batted .346 for the 1874 Philadelphia Athletics.
- April 21 – Josh Snyder, 37, left fielder for the 1872 Brooklyn Eckfords.
- April 21 – James Sumner, 29, umpire in National league from 1876 to 1878.
- May 10 – Fraley Rogers, 30?, outfielder for the Boston Red Stockings from 1872 to 1873.
- May 13 – Mort Rogers, ?, umpire in the National Association from 1871 to 1872.
- July 11 – Steve Dignan, 22, played in 11 games for two teams in 1880.
- September 7 – Red Woodhead, 30, third baseman for the 1879 Syracuse Stars.
- September 12 – Chub Sullivan, 25, first baseman who played from 1877 to 1880.
- October 7 – Mike Brannock, 29, played parts of two seasons with Chicago White Stockings in the 1870s.
- November 11 – Clipper Flynn, 32, hit .338 in his only full season in 1871.
