= 1881 Boston Red Caps season =

1881 Boston Red Caps
- League: National League
- Ballpark: South End Grounds
- City: Boston, Massachusetts
- Record: 38–45 (.458)
- League place: 6th
- Owner: Arthur Soden
- Manager: Harry Wright

The 1881 Boston Red Caps season was the 11th season of the franchise.

== Regular season ==
=== Season standings ===
National League
Team	W	L	Pct.	GB	Home	Road
Chicago White Stockings	56	28	.667	—	32‍–‍10	24‍–‍18
Providence Grays	47	37	.560	9	23‍–‍20	24‍–‍17
Buffalo Bisons	45	38	.542	10½	25‍–‍16	20‍–‍22
Detroit Wolverines	41	43	.488	15	23‍–‍19	18‍–‍24
Troy Trojans	39	45	.464	17	24‍–‍18	15‍–‍27
Boston Red Caps	38	45	.458	17½	19‍–‍22	19‍–‍23
Cleveland Blues	36	48	.429	20	20‍–‍22	16‍–‍26
Worcester Worcesters	32	50	.390	23	19‍–‍22	13‍–‍28

=== Record vs. opponents ===
1881 National League record Sources:
Team	BSN	BUF	CHI	CLE	DET	PRO	TRO	WOR
Boston	—	4–8	2–10	8–4	4–8	5–7	7–5	8–3
Buffalo	8–4	—	5–7	7–5	9–3	7–5	3–9	6–5
Chicago	10–2	7–5	—	6–6	7–5	9–3	8–4	9–3
Cleveland	4–8	5–7	6–6	—	5–7	3–9	6–6–1	7–5
Detroit	8–4	3–9	5–7	7–5	—	4–8	7–5	7–5
Providence	7–5	5–7	3–9	9–3	8–4	—	6–6	9–3
Troy	5–7	9–3	4–8	6–6–1	5–7	6–6	—	4–8
Worcester	3–8	5–6	3–9	5–7	5–7	3–9	8–4	—

=== Roster ===
1881 Boston Red Caps
Roster
Pitchers: Tommy Bond; John Fox; Jim Whitney; Catchers: Pat Deasley; Pop Snyder	Infielders: Ross Barnes; Jack Burdock; John Morrill; Joe Quinn; Ezra Sutton; George Wright; Sam Wright	Outfielders: Bill Crowley; Joe Hornung; Fred Lewis; Bobby Mathews; John Richmond	Manager: Harry Wright

== Player stats ==
=== Batting ===
==== Starters by position ====
Note: Pos = Position; G = Games played; AB = At bats; H = Hits; Avg. = Batting average; HR = Home runs; RBI = Runs batted in

Pos	Player	G	AB	H	Avg.	HR	RBI
C	Pop Snyder	62	219	50	.228	0	16
1B	John Morrill	81	311	90	.289	1	39
2B	Jack Burdock	73	282	67	.238	1	24
3B	Ezra Sutton	83	333	97	.291	0	31
SS	Ross Barnes	69	295	80	.271	0	17
OF	Joe Hornung	83	324	78	.241	2	25
OF	Bill Crowley	72	279	71	.254	0	31
OF	Fred Lewis	27	114	25	.219	0	9

==== Other batters ====
Note: G = Games played; AB = At bats; H = Hits; Avg. = Batting average; HR = Home runs; RBI = Runs batted in

Player	G	AB	H	Avg.	HR	RBI
Pat Deasley	43	147	45	.238	0	8
John Richmond	27	98	27	.276	1	12
Bobby Mathews	19	71	12	.169	0	4
George Wright	7	25	5	.200	0	0
Joe Quinn	1	4	0	.000	0	0
Sam Wright	1	4	1	.250	0	0

=== Pitching ===
==== Starting pitchers ====
Note: G = Games pitched; IP = Innings pitched; W = Wins; L = Losses; ERA = Earned run average; SO = Strikeouts

Player	G	IP	W	L	ERA	SO
Jim Whitney	66	552.1	31	33	2.48	162
John Fox	17	124.1	6	8	3.33	30
Tommy Bond	3	25.1	0	3	4.26	2

==== Other pitchers ====
Note: G = Games pitched; IP = Innings pitched; W = Wins; L = Losses; ERA = Earned run average; SO = Strikeouts

Player	G	IP	W	L	ERA	SO
Bobby Mathews	5	23.0	1	0	2.35	5

==== Relief pitchers ====
Note: G = Games pitched; W = Wins; L = Losses; SV = Saves; ERA = Earned run average; SO = Strikeouts

Player	G	W	L	SV	ERA	SO
John Morrill	3	0	1	1	6.35	0
