= The Gardner News =

Daily American newspaper

- Type: Daily newspaper
- Format: Broadsheet
- Owner: USA Today Co.
- Founded: July 3, 1869
- Headquarters: 330 Main Street, Gardner, Massachusetts 01441, United States
- Circulation: 3,027 (as of 2018)
- ISSN: 0740-0837
- Website: thegardnernews.com

The Gardner News is a daily newspaper serving seven cities and towns in northwest Worcester County, Massachusetts. In addition to the city of Gardner, where it is headquartered, it also covers the rural towns of Ashburnham, Hubbardston, Phillipston, Templeton, Westminster, and Winchendon, Massachusetts.

The News publishes every day except Sunday. The newspaper is shifting to distribution through the U.S. Postal Service as of the end of March, 2026. Its chief local competitor is GardnerMagazine.com (Gardner Magazine), an online publication with a circulation of about 50,000+ unique households in 2026. Its chief traditional newspaper competitors are the county's two largest newspapers, the Fitchburg Sentinel & Enterprise and Worcester Telegram & Gazette, as well as the Athol Daily News.

== History ==
The Gardner News was first established as a weekly newspaper on July 3, 1869 by A. G. Bushnell. The paper was released every Saturday and was popularly received.

From 1885 to 1895 the paper was owned by Asa Stratton, a former professional baseball player and attorney.

On June 21, 1897, under the direction of owner and editor Levi H. Greenwood, the News became a four-page daily paper. Both a weekly and daily edition were published until December 31, 1904, when the final weekly edition came off the presses.

In 1906 the paper moved to a newly constructed building at 309 Central Street.

In 1921 the paper was purchased by Walter E. Hubbard of Brattleboro, Vermont, who previously owned the Brattleboro Reformer and the Beverly Times. Upon Hubbard's death, ownership of the paper was assumed by a trust.

=== Bell family ===
After the death of her father, Dorothy Hubbard Bell became publisher of The Gardner News. When she died in 1963, her two sons, C. Gordon Bell and W. Shane Bell became the owners. In 1964, C. Gordon Bell became general manager and his father W. F. Gordon Bell became president. In 1973, C. Gordon Bell succeeded his father as president and publisher. During Gordon Bell's tenure as publisher, the newspaper modernized and was recognized as a leader among small New England dailies.

Upon Gordon Bell's death in 1992, his wife Alberta Bell became publisher of the newspaper where she had worked since 1986.

In June 2011, Alberta Bell announced she would sell the paper to MediaNews Group, which owns the Sentinel & Enterprise. Five months later she called off the sale, without giving any reason publicly.

In March 2018, Alberta Bell sold The Gardner News to Gatehouse Media.

=== The Leominster Times ===
During Alberta Bell's tenure as publisher, The Gardner News made one bid to expand its footprint, a six-month attempt in late 1994 to establish a new newspaper for Fitchburg and Leominster, Massachusetts. The Leominster Times was marketed as a general-interest newspaper, but Bell said she would make special efforts to cover minorities in Fitchburg and Leominster.

Initially launched as a six-day daily newspaper (Monday through Saturday) in July 1994, The Times five months later cut back to a twice-weekly schedule and focused its coverage on Leominster only. Its January 6, 1995 issue was its last.
