= Andy Piercy (baseball) =

American baseball player (1855–1932)

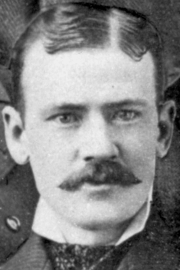
- Third baseman/Second baseman
- Born: November 1855; San Jose, California, U.S.
- Died: December 27, 1932 (aged 77); San Jose, California, U.S.
- Batted: Unknown Threw: Right

MLB debut
- May 12, 1881, for the Chicago White Stockings

Last MLB appearance
- June 30, 1881, for the Chicago White Stockings

MLB statistics
- Batting average: .250
- Hits: 2
- Runs: 1
- Stats at Baseball Reference

Teams
- Chicago White Stockings (1881)

Andrew Josiah Piercy (November 1855 – December 27, 1932) was an American Major League Baseball infielder. He played in two games for the Chicago White Stockings in 1881.

He was born and died in San Jose, California and was the first California-born player in National League history.
