= 1881 Providence Grays season =

1881 Providence Grays
- League: National League
- Ballpark: Messer Street Grounds
- City: Providence, Rhode Island
- Record: 47–37 (.560)
- League place: 2nd
- Owner: Henry Root
- Managers: Jack Farrell, Tom York

The Providence Grays finished the 1881 season in second place in the National League for a second straight season. However, management strife and sagging attendance hurt the team's bottom line and they occasionally had trouble meeting payroll.

== Regular season ==
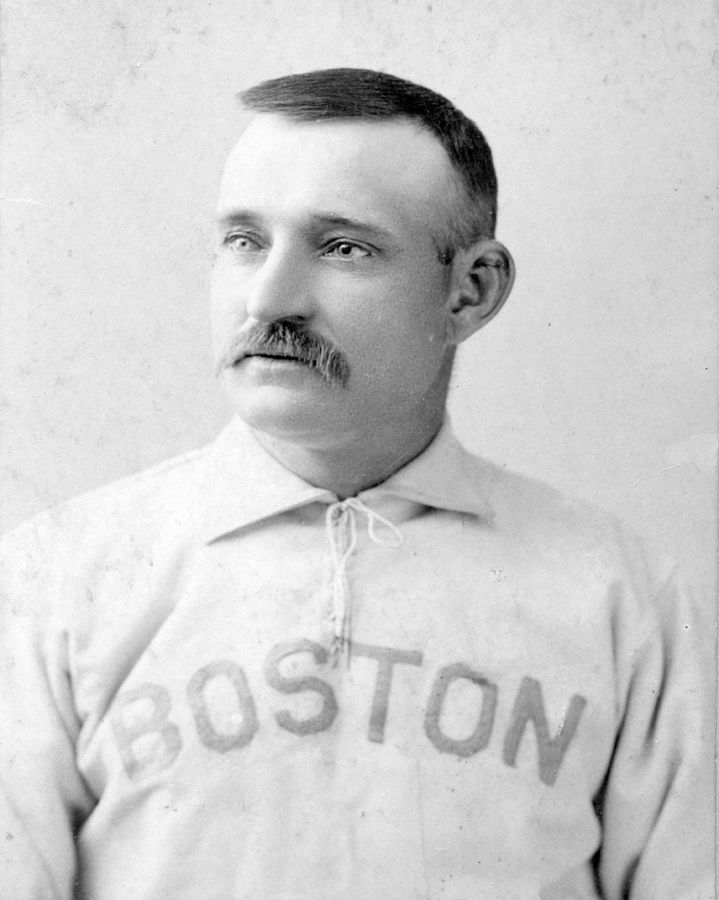
Pitcher Charles Radbourn

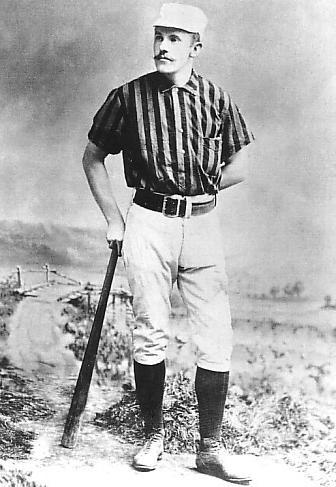
Pitcher John Montgomery Ward

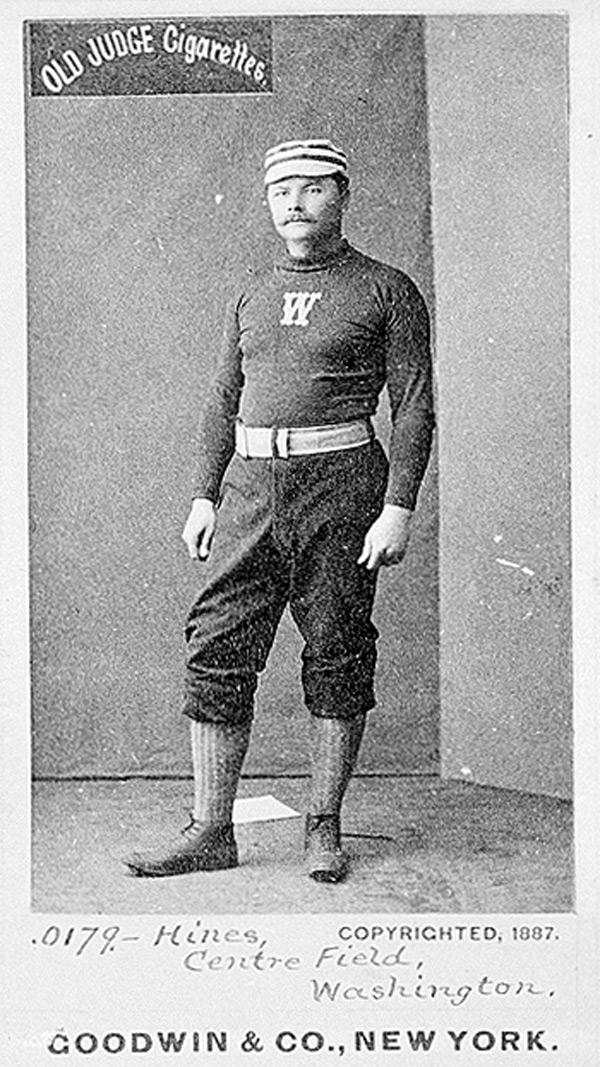
Center fielder Paul Hines

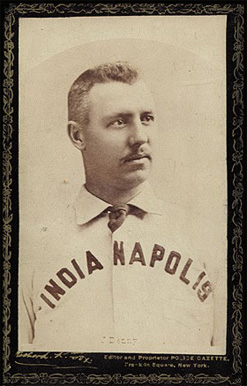
Third baseman Jerry Denny

=== Season standings ===
National League
Team	W	L	Pct.	GB	Home	Road
Chicago White Stockings	56	28	.667	—	32‍–‍10	24‍–‍18
Providence Grays	47	37	.560	9	23‍–‍20	24‍–‍17
Buffalo Bisons	45	38	.542	10½	25‍–‍16	20‍–‍22
Detroit Wolverines	41	43	.488	15	23‍–‍19	18‍–‍24
Troy Trojans	39	45	.464	17	24‍–‍18	15‍–‍27
Boston Red Caps	38	45	.458	17½	19‍–‍22	19‍–‍23
Cleveland Blues	36	48	.429	20	20‍–‍22	16‍–‍26
Worcester Worcesters	32	50	.390	23	19‍–‍22	13‍–‍28

=== Record vs. opponents ===
1881 National League record Sources:
Team	BSN	BUF	CHI	CLE	DET	PRO	TRO	WOR
Boston	—	4–8	2–10	8–4	4–8	5–7	7–5	8–3
Buffalo	8–4	—	5–7	7–5	9–3	7–5	3–9	6–5
Chicago	10–2	7–5	—	6–6	7–5	9–3	8–4	9–3
Cleveland	4–8	5–7	6–6	—	5–7	3–9	6–6–1	7–5
Detroit	8–4	3–9	5–7	7–5	—	4–8	7–5	7–5
Providence	7–5	5–7	3–9	9–3	8–4	—	6–6	9–3
Troy	5–7	9–3	4–8	6–6–1	5–7	6–6	—	4–8
Worcester	3–8	5–6	3–9	5–7	5–7	3–9	8–4	—

=== Roster ===
1881 Providence Grays
Roster
Pitchers: Bobby Mathews; Charles Radbourn; Catchers: Barney Gilligan; Emil Gross	Infielders: Jerry Denny; Jack Farrell; Bill McClellan; Henry Myers; Joe Start	Outfielders: Lew Brown; Paul Hines; John Ward; Tom York	Manager: Jack Farrell; Tom York

== Player stats ==
=== Batting ===
==== Starters by position ====
Note: Pos = Position; G = Games played; AB = At bats; H = Hits; Avg. = Batting average; HR = Home runs; RBI = Runs batted in

Pos	Player	G	AB	H	Avg.	HR	RBI
C	Emil Gross	51	182	50	.275	1	24
1B	Joe Start	79	348	114	.328	0	29
2B	Jack Farrell	84	345	82	.238	5	36
3B	Jerry Denny	85	320	77	.241	1	24
SS	Bill McClellan	68	259	43	.166	0	16
OF	Tom York	85	316	96	.304	2	47
OF	Paul Hines	80	361	103	.285	2	31
OF	John Ward	85	357	87	.244	0	53

==== Other batters ====
Note: G = Games played; AB = At bats; H = Hits; Avg. = Batting average; HR = Home runs; RBI = Runs batted in

Player	G	AB	H	Avg.	HR	RBI
Charles Radbourn	72	270	59	.219	0	28
Barney Gilligan	46	183	40	.219	0	20
Lew Brown	18	75	18	.240	0	10
Henry Myers	1	4	0	.000	0	0

=== Pitching ===
==== Starting pitchers ====
Note: G = Games pitched; IP = Innings pitched; W = Wins; L = Losses; ERA = Earned run average; SO = Strikeouts

Player	G	IP	W	L	ERA	SO
John Ward	39	330.0	18	18	2.13	119
Charles Radbourn	41	325.1	25	11	2.43	117
Bobby Mathews	14	102.1	4	8	3.17	28
