= Asa Stratton =

American baseball player (1853–1925)

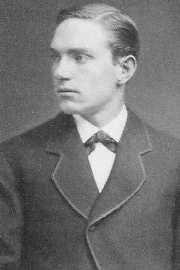
- Shortstop
- Born: February 10, 1853; Grafton, Massachusetts, U.S.
- Died: August 14, 1925 (aged 72); Fitchburg, Massachusetts, U.S.
- Batted: Unknown Threw: Unknown

MLB debut
- June 17, 1881, for the Worcester Ruby Legs

Last MLB appearance
- June 17, 1881, for the Worcester Ruby Legs

MLB statistics
- Batting average: .250
- Games played: 1
- hits: 1
- Stats at Baseball Reference

Teams
- Worcester Ruby Legs (1881)

Asa Evans Stratton (February 10, 1853 – August 14, 1925) was an American newspaper editor, lawyer, and baseball player who played one game for the Worcester Ruby Legs in 1881.

== Early life ==
Stratton was born on February 10, 1853, in Grafton, Massachusetts, to Cyrus W. Stratton and Eliza A. (Bosworth) Stratton.

== Baseball ==
Stratton attended Brown University, where he played on the school's baseball team and was managing editor of the school newspaper, Libre Braunensis. He graduated in 1873 and went on to attend the Boston University School of Law and play semipro baseball for a number of teams including Live Oak and the Rolestone nine in Fitchburg, Massachusetts.

On June 17, 1881, Stratton appeared in a game at shortstop for the Worcester Ruby Legs. In that game, he had one hit in four at bats. He was the first Brown alumnus to play in the majors.

== Newspaper editor ==
Outside of baseball, Stratton practiced law in Worcester and Fitchburg. In 1885 he ended his practice when he became the proprietor of The Gardner News. From 1895 to 1902 he was the editor of the Fitchburg Morning Sun. From 1905 to 1925 he worked for Fitchburg Sentinel as city editor (1905 to 1918) and editorial writer (1918 to 1925). He was also a well known music critic.

== Personal life ==
On April 10, 1878, Stratton married Ada F. Bigelow. They had one child, Helen Florence Stratton.

Stratton resided in Fitchburg for 47 years and was a member of the city's Library Board of Trustees.

== Death ==
Stratton died in his home at 80 Highland Ave. in Fitchburg on August 14, 1925. The cause of death was listed as "shock". He is interred at Riverside Cemetery in Grafton.
