= 1881 Chicago White Stockings season =

1881 Chicago White Stockings
- National League champions
- League: National League
- Ballpark: Lakefront Park
- City: Chicago
- Record: 56–28 (.667)
- League place: 1st
- Owner: William Hulbert
- Manager: Cap Anson

The 1881 Chicago White Stockings season was the tenth season of the Chicago White Stockings franchise, the sixth in the National League and the fourth at Lakefront Park. The White Stockings won the National League championship with a record of 56–28.

== Regular season ==
=== Season standings ===
National League
| Team | W | L | Pct. | GB | Home | Road |
|---|---|---|---|---|---|---|
| Chicago White Stockings | 56 | 28 | .667 | — | 32‍–‍10 | 24‍–‍18 |
| Providence Grays | 47 | 37 | .560 | 9 | 23‍–‍20 | 24‍–‍17 |
| Buffalo Bisons | 45 | 38 | .542 | 10½ | 25‍–‍16 | 20‍–‍22 |
| Detroit Wolverines | 41 | 43 | .488 | 15 | 23‍–‍19 | 18‍–‍24 |
| Troy Trojans | 39 | 45 | .464 | 17 | 24‍–‍18 | 15‍–‍27 |
| Boston Red Caps | 38 | 45 | .458 | 17½ | 19‍–‍22 | 19‍–‍23 |
| Cleveland Blues | 36 | 48 | .429 | 20 | 20‍–‍22 | 16‍–‍26 |
| Worcester Worcesters | 32 | 50 | .390 | 23 | 19‍–‍22 | 13‍–‍28 |

=== Record vs. opponents ===
1881 National League record Sources:
| Team | BSN | BUF | CHI | CLE | DET | PRO | TRO | WOR |
|---|---|---|---|---|---|---|---|---|
| Boston | — | 4–8 | 2–10 | 8–4 | 4–8 | 5–7 | 7–5 | 8–3 |
| Buffalo | 8–4 | — | 5–7 | 7–5 | 9–3 | 7–5 | 3–9 | 6–5 |
| Chicago | 10–2 | 7–5 | — | 6–6 | 7–5 | 9–3 | 8–4 | 9–3 |
| Cleveland | 4–8 | 5–7 | 6–6 | — | 5–7 | 3–9 | 6–6–1 | 7–5 |
| Detroit | 8–4 | 3–9 | 5–7 | 7–5 | — | 4–8 | 7–5 | 7–5 |
| Providence | 7–5 | 5–7 | 3–9 | 9–3 | 8–4 | — | 6–6 | 9–3 |
| Troy | 5–7 | 9–3 | 4–8 | 6–6–1 | 5–7 | 6–6 | — | 4–8 |
| Worcester | 3–8 | 5–6 | 3–9 | 5–7 | 5–7 | 3–9 | 8–4 | — |

== Roster ==
1881 Chicago White Stockings
Roster
| Pitchers: Larry Corcoran; Fred Goldsmith; Catchers: Silver Flint | Infielders: Cap Anson; Tom Burns; Andy Piercy; Joe Quest; Ned Williamson | Outfielders: Abner Dalrymple; George Gore; King Kelly; Hugh Nicol | Manager: Cap Anson |

== Player stats ==
=== Batting ===
==== Starters by position ====
Note: Pos = Position; G = Games played; AB = At bats; H = Hits; Avg. = Batting average; HR = Home runs; RBI = Runs batted in

| Pos | Player | G | AB | H | Avg. | HR | RBI |
|---|---|---|---|---|---|---|---|
| C | Silver Flint | 80 | 306 | 95 | .310 | 1 | 34 |
| 1B | Cap Anson | 84 | 343 | 137 | .399 | 1 | 82 |
| 2B | Joe Quest | 78 | 293 | 72 | .246 | 1 | 26 |
| 3B | Ned Williamson | 82 | 343 | 92 | .268 | 1 | 48 |
| SS | Tom Burns | 84 | 342 | 95 | .278 | 4 | 42 |
| OF | Abner Dalrymple | 82 | 362 | 117 | .323 | 1 | 37 |
| OF | George Gore | 73 | 309 | 92 | .298 | 1 | 44 |
| OF | King Kelly | 82 | 353 | 114 | .323 | 2 | 55 |

==== Other batters ====
Note: G = Games played; AB = At bats; H = Hits; Avg. = Batting average; HR = Home runs; RBI = Runs batted in

| Player | G | AB | H | Avg. | HR | RBI |
|---|---|---|---|---|---|---|
| Hugh Nicol | 26 | 108 | 22 | .204 | 0 | 7 |
| Andy Piercy | 2 | 8 | 2 | .250 | 0 | 0 |

=== Pitching ===
==== Starting pitchers ====
Note: G = Games pitched; IP = Innings pitched; W = Wins; L = Losses; ERA = Earned run average; SO = Strikeouts

| Player | G | IP | W | L | ERA | SO |
|---|---|---|---|---|---|---|
| Larry Corcoran | 45 | 396.2 | 31 | 14 | 2.31 | 150 |
| Fred Goldsmith | 39 | 330.2 | 24 | 13 | 2.59 | 76 |

==== Other pitchers ====
Note: G = Games pitched; IP = Innings pitched; W = Wins; L = Losses; ERA = Earned run average; SO = Strikeouts

| Player | G | IP | W | L | ERA | SO |
|---|---|---|---|---|---|---|
| Ned Williamson | 3 | 18.0 | 1 | 1 | 2.00 | 2 |
