= Haymakers' Grounds =

Baseball grounds in Troy, New York, US

- Interactive map of Haymakers' Grounds
- Location: Lansingburgh, New York
- Coordinates: 42°45′36″N 73°40′51″W
- Surface: grass

Tenants
- Troy Haymakers (NAPBBP) (1871–1872); Troy Trojans (NL) (1880–1881)

Haymakers' Grounds was a baseball grounds in Lansingburgh, New York, which is now part of Troy, New York. It was home to the Troy Haymakers of the National Association from 1871 to 1872 and home to the Troy Trojans of the National League from 1880 to 1881.

Most sources give the location of the ballpark as 104th Street (north); 2nd Avenue (west); 103rd Street (south); and 5th Avenue (east). Those streets were previously numbered 4th and 3rd. Before the streets were numbered, they had names: 2nd Avenue was State Street; 4th/104th was Vail Street; 3rd/103rd was Thomas Street; and 5th Avenue was Whipple Street. This is in the vicinity of Knickerbacker Park, a public park which contains a monument outlining the history of Troy's brief major league experience. The monument was unveiled on June 6, 1992, before an exhibition game played between the Troy Trojans and Worcester Worcesters, with the teams wearing uniforms and playing under rules from 1882—the final year of the two NL clubs.

The streets were renumbered to correspond with Troy's numbering system, and also the fact that some names were duplicated: For example, Troy has an east-west thoroughfare called State Street.

An alternate name for this location, as seen in some references, is "the Vail Lot" or "Vail's lot". The Vail family were early settlers of the area, and this location hosted baseball games starting in the 1860s.

The NL club played home games at Putnam Grounds, Troy, in 1879, and at Troy Ball Club Grounds, Watervliet, in 1882.
