= Martin Flaherty (baseball) =

American baseball player (1853–1920)

- Outfielder
- Born: September 24, 1853; Worcester, Massachusetts, U.S.
- Died: June 10, 1920 (aged 66); Providence, Rhode Island, U.S.
- Batted: Left Threw: Left

MLB debut
- August 18, 1881, for the Worcester Ruby Legs

Last MLB appearance
- August 18, 1881, for the Worcester Ruby Legs

MLB statistics
- Games played: 1
- At bats: 2
- Hits: 0
- Stats at Baseball Reference

Teams
- Worcester Ruby Legs (1881)

Martin John Flaherty (September 24, 1853 – June 10, 1920) was an American outfielder in Major League Baseball for one game in 1881. He struck out in both of his at bats. He played this game on August 18 for the team that represents the city of his birth, Worcester Ruby Legs. The following season, in 1882, he umpired one game. He died in Providence, Rhode Island at the age of 66, and is interred at St. Anne's Cemetery in East Providence, Rhode Island.
