= 1881 Buffalo Bisons season =

1881 Buffalo Bisons
- League: National League
- Ballpark: Riverside Park
- City: Buffalo, New York
- Record: 45–38 (.542)
- League place: 3rd
- Manager: Jim O'Rourke

The 1881 Buffalo Bisons finished the season with a 45–38 record, good for third place in the National League.

A highlight from this season occurred on September 15. In a 12-inning game against Worcester, Buffalo second baseman Davy Force recorded 12 putouts, seven assists, two unassisted double plays, participated in a triple play, and made just one error in 20 chances.

== Regular season ==
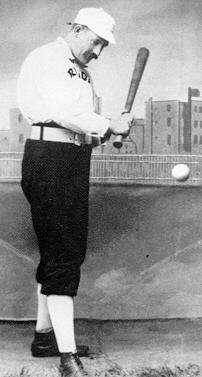
Left fielder Dan Brouthers

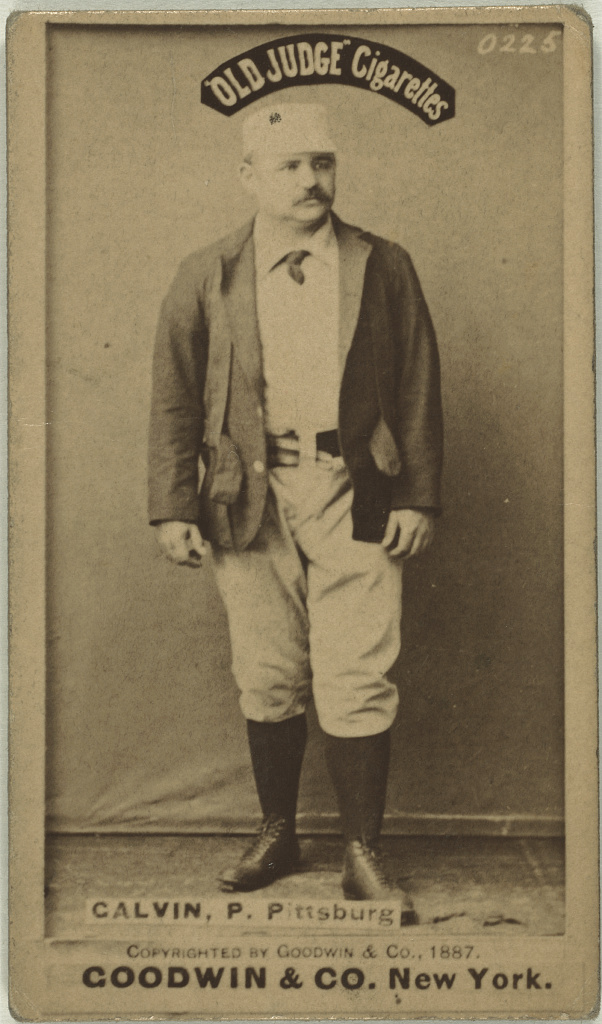
Pitcher Pud Galvin

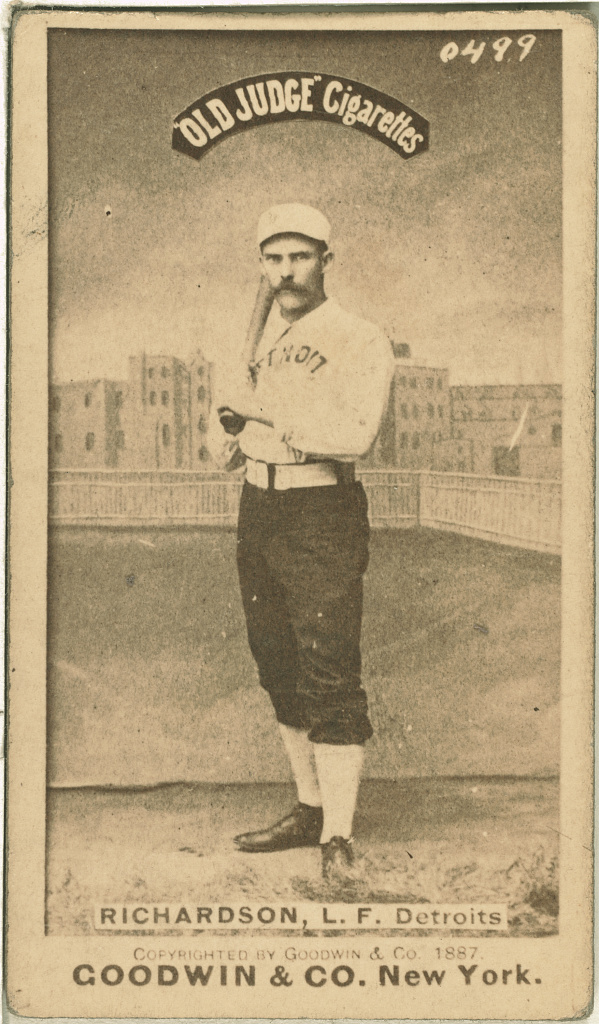
Center fielder Hardy Richardson

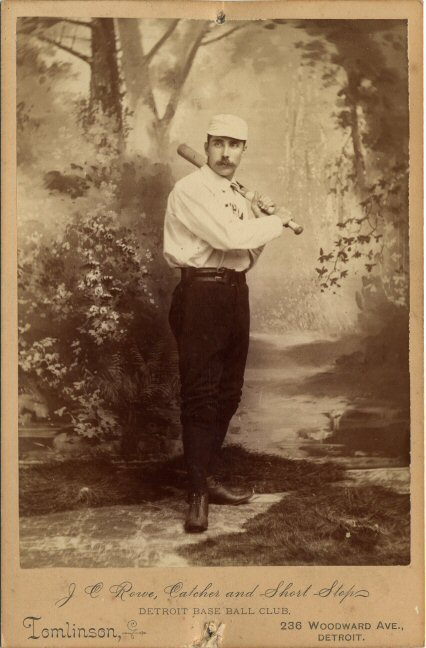
Catcher Jack Rowe

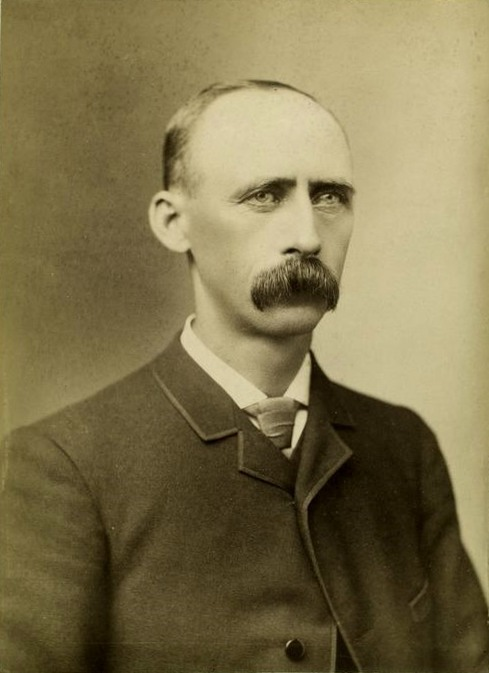
First baseman Deacon White

=== Season standings ===
National League
| Team | W | L | Pct. | GB | Home | Road |
|---|---|---|---|---|---|---|
| Chicago White Stockings | 56 | 28 | .667 | — | 32‍–‍10 | 24‍–‍18 |
| Providence Grays | 47 | 37 | .560 | 9 | 23‍–‍20 | 24‍–‍17 |
| Buffalo Bisons | 45 | 38 | .542 | 10½ | 25‍–‍16 | 20‍–‍22 |
| Detroit Wolverines | 41 | 43 | .488 | 15 | 23‍–‍19 | 18‍–‍24 |
| Troy Trojans | 39 | 45 | .464 | 17 | 24‍–‍18 | 15‍–‍27 |
| Boston Red Caps | 38 | 45 | .458 | 17½ | 19‍–‍22 | 19‍–‍23 |
| Cleveland Blues | 36 | 48 | .429 | 20 | 20‍–‍22 | 16‍–‍26 |
| Worcester Worcesters | 32 | 50 | .390 | 23 | 19‍–‍22 | 13‍–‍28 |

=== Record vs. opponents ===
1881 National League record Sources:
| Team | BSN | BUF | CHI | CLE | DET | PRO | TRO | WOR |
|---|---|---|---|---|---|---|---|---|
| Boston | — | 4–8 | 2–10 | 8–4 | 4–8 | 5–7 | 7–5 | 8–3 |
| Buffalo | 8–4 | — | 5–7 | 7–5 | 9–3 | 7–5 | 3–9 | 6–5 |
| Chicago | 10–2 | 7–5 | — | 6–6 | 7–5 | 9–3 | 8–4 | 9–3 |
| Cleveland | 4–8 | 5–7 | 6–6 | — | 5–7 | 3–9 | 6–6–1 | 7–5 |
| Detroit | 8–4 | 3–9 | 5–7 | 7–5 | — | 4–8 | 7–5 | 7–5 |
| Providence | 7–5 | 5–7 | 3–9 | 9–3 | 8–4 | — | 6–6 | 9–3 |
| Troy | 5–7 | 9–3 | 4–8 | 6–6–1 | 5–7 | 6–6 | — | 4–8 |
| Worcester | 3–8 | 5–6 | 3–9 | 5–7 | 5–7 | 3–9 | 8–4 | — |

=== Roster ===
1881 Buffalo Bisons
Roster
| Pitchers: Pud Galvin; Jack Lynch; Catchers: Jack Rowe; Sleeper Sullivan | Infielders: Davy Force; John Morrissey; Jim O'Rourke; John Peters; Pop Smith; Deacon White | Outfielders: Dan Brouthers; Curry Foley; Jack Manning; Blondie Purcell; Hardy Richardson; Ed Swartwood | Manager: Jim O'Rourke |

== Player stats ==
=== Batting ===
==== Starters by position ====
Note: Pos = Position; G = Games played; AB = At bats; H = Hits; Avg. = Batting average; HR = Home runs; RBI = Runs batted in

| Pos | Player | G | AB | H | Avg. | HR | RBI |
|---|---|---|---|---|---|---|---|
| C | Jack Rowe | 64 | 246 | 82 | .333 | 1 | 43 |
| 1B | Deacon White | 78 | 319 | 99 | .310 | 0 | 53 |
| 2B | Davy Force | 75 | 278 | 50 | .180 | 0 | 15 |
| 3B | Jim O'Rourke | 83 | 348 | 105 | .302 | 0 | 30 |
| SS | John Peters | 54 | 229 | 49 | .214 | 0 | 25 |
| OF | Curry Foley | 83 | 375 | 96 | .256 | 1 | 25 |
| OF | Hardy Richardson | 83 | 344 | 100 | .291 | 2 | 53 |
| OF | Dan Brouthers | 65 | 270 | 86 | .319 | 8 | 45 |

==== Other batters ====
Note: G = Games played; AB = At bats; H = Hits; Avg. = Batting average; HR = Home runs; RBI = Runs batted in

| Player | G | AB | H | Avg. | HR | RBI |
|---|---|---|---|---|---|---|
| Sleeper Sullivan | 35 | 121 | 23 | .190 | 0 | 15 |
| Blondie Purcell | 30 | 113 | 33 | .292 | 0 | 17 |
| John Morrissey | 12 | 47 | 10 | .213 | 0 | 3 |
| Pop Smith | 3 | 11 | 0 | .000 | 0 | 1 |
| Ed Swartwood | 1 | 3 | 1 | .333 | 0 | 0 |
| Jack Manning | 1 | 1 | 0 | .000 | 0 | 0 |

=== Pitching ===
==== Starting pitchers ====
Note: G = Games pitched; IP = Innings pitched; W = Wins; L = Losses; ERA = Earned run average; SO = Strikeouts

| Player | G | IP | W | L | ERA | SO |
|---|---|---|---|---|---|---|
| Pud Galvin | 56 | 474.0 | 28 | 24 | 2.37 | 136 |
| Jack Lynch | 20 | 165.2 | 10 | 9 | 3.59 | 32 |

==== Other pitchers ====
Note: G = Games pitched; IP = Innings pitched; W = Wins; L = Losses; ERA = Earned run average; SO = Strikeouts

| Player | G | IP | W | L | ERA | SO |
|---|---|---|---|---|---|---|
| Curry Foley | 10 | 41.0 | 3 | 4 | 5.27 | 2 |
| Blondie Purcell | 9 | 61.2 | 4 | 1 | 2.77 | 15 |
