= Jerry Dorgan =

American baseball player (1856–1891)

- Catcher / Right fielder
- Born: 1856; Meriden, Connecticut, U.S.
- Died: June 10, 1891 (aged 34–35); Middletown, Connecticut, U.S.
- Batted: Left Threw: Right

MLB debut
- May 2, 1880, for the Worcester Ruby Legs

Last MLB appearance
- August 23, 1885, for the Brooklyn Ward's Wonders

MLB statistics
- Batting average: .282
- Home runs: 0
- RBIs: 49
- Stats at Baseball Reference

Teams
- Worcester Ruby Legs (1880); Philadelphia Athletics (1882); Indianapolis Hoosiers (1884); Brooklyn Atlantics (1884); Detroit Wolverines (1885)

Jeremiah F. Dorgan (1856 – June 10, 1891) was an American professional baseball player from 1879 to 1887. He played four seasons of Major League Baseball as a right fielder and catcher for five major league clubs. He appeared in 131 major league games and compiled a .282 batting average with 22 doubles, four triples, no home runs and 49 RBIs.

Dorgan's baseball career reportedly came to an early end due to his "unconquerable appetite for liquor"; he died of alcohol poisoning in 1891 after being discovered intoxicated in a Connecticut barn with an empty liquor bottle by his side.

== Early years ==
Dorgan was born in Meriden, Connecticut in 1856. His parents were Cornelius Dorgan and Mary (Cahill) Dorgan, both of whom were immigrants from Ireland. His older brother, Mike Dorgan, played ten seasons of Major League Baseball from 1877 to 1890.

== Professional baseball player ==
Dorgan began his career as a professional baseball player in 1879 with the Holyoke, Massachusetts team where he compiled a .304 batting average.

Dorgan made his major league debut in July 1880 with the Worcester Ruby Legs in the National League. He appeared in 10 games for Worcester, nine of them as an outfielder, and had seven hits in 35 at bats. Dorgan also appeared in 22 games for the Albany, New York baseball club in 1880.

In 1881, Dorgan played for the Brooklyn Atlantics and New York Mets in the Eastern Championship Association. The following year he returned to the major leagues with the Philadelphia Athletics. He appeared in 44 games for Philadelphia, 25 as a catcher and 22 as an outfielder. He compiled a .282 average before being released by the club on September 4, 1882.

There is no record of Dorgan playing organized baseball in 1883. In 1884, he appeared in 34 games for the Indianapolis Hoosiers and four games for the Brooklyn Atlantics. He was released by Indianapolis in July and by Brooklyn in August 1884. He compiled a .299 batting average in 154 at bats during the 1884 season.

In 1885, Dorgan appeared in 39 games, all in the outfield, for the Detroit Wolverines of the National League. He compiled a .286 batting average for Detroit. He appeared in his last major league game as a member of the Detroit team on June 25, 1885.

After his major league career ended, Dorgan played two additional seasons in the Eastern League, for the Meriden Silvermen in 1886 and for the Hartford Dark Blues in 1887.

Over the course of four major league seasons, Dorgan appeared in 131 major league games and compiled a .282 batting average with 22 doubles, four triples, 0 home runs and 49 RBIs. Alcohol was blamed for the early end to his career. The Sporting Life called him "a fine outfielder and a heavy batsman" who had promise, but whose career ended prematurely due to "irregular habits" and "his unconquerable appetite for liquor."

== Death ==
Dorgan died in June 1891 at age 35, after being found lying inebriated at 2 a.m. with an empty liquor bottle beside him in a stable behind the Kilbourn House in Middletown, Connecticut. He was brought to the police lockup in Middletown where he was discovered to be dead in his cell two hours later. His cause of death was stated to be alcohol poisoning and/or alcoholism. The Sporting Life published a front-page account of his death under the headline, "THE WAGES OF SIN: A Once Promising Career Ended By Disgraceful Death." Dorgan was interred at the St. John Cemetery in Middletown.
