= Ed Caskin =

American baseball player (1851–1924)

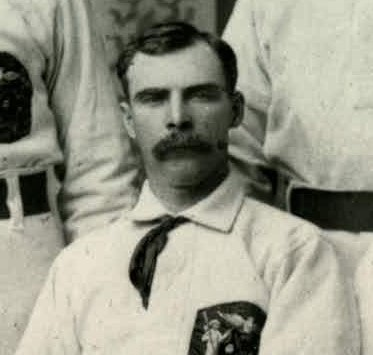
- Caskin in 1883
- Shortstop
- Born: December 30, 1851; Danvers, Massachusetts, U.S.
- Died: October 9, 1924 (aged 72); Danvers, Massachusetts, U.S.
- Batted: Right Threw: Right

MLB debut
- May 1, 1879, for the Troy Trojans

Last MLB appearance
- September 24, 1886, for the New York Giants

MLB statistics
- Batting average: .228
- Home runs: 2
- Runs batted in: 163
- Stats at Baseball Reference

Teams
- Troy Trojans (1879–1881); New York Gothams (1883–1884); St. Louis Maroons (1885); New York Giants (1886)

Edward James Caskin (December 30, 1851 – October 9, 1924), born in Danvers, Massachusetts, was an American baseball shortstop for the Troy Trojans (1879–1881), New York Gothams/Giants (1883–1884 and 1886) and St. Louis Maroons (1885).

In 7 seasons he played in 482 games and had 1,871 at bats, 229 runs, 427 hits, 50 doubles, 10 triples, 2 home runs, 163 RBI, 82 walks, .228 batting average, .261 on-base percentage, .269 slugging percentage and 503 total bases.

Caskin died in his hometown of Danvers at the age of 72.

== Sources ==
- Career statistics from Baseball Reference · Baseball Reference (Minors) · Retrosheet · Baseball Almanac
