= Joe Quinn (catcher) =

American baseball player

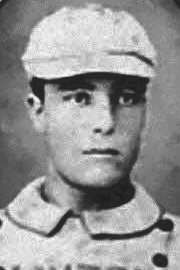
- Catcher
- Born: September 22, 1856; Boston, Massachusetts, U.S.
- Died: March 1893 (aged 36)
- Batted: Unknown Threw: Unknown

MLB debut
- September 7, 1881, for the Boston Red Caps

Last MLB appearance
- September 27, 1881, for the Worcester Ruby Legs

MLB statistics
- Batting average: .091
- Home runs: 0
- Runs batted in: 1
- Stats at Baseball Reference

Teams
- Boston Red Caps (1881); Worcester Ruby Legs (1881)

Joseph Andrew Quinn (September 22, 1856 – March 1893) was an American Major League Baseball player in 1881. He played three games for two different teams that year: one for the Boston Red Caps as a first baseman and two for the Worcester Ruby Legs as a catcher. He also umpired a total of 25 National League games in 1881 and 1882.
