= George Bradley =

American baseball player (1852–1931)

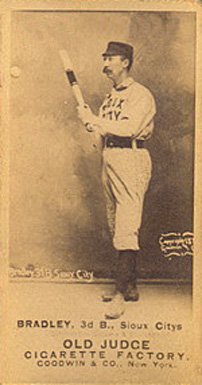
- Bradley in an 1887 baseball card
- Pitcher / Third baseman
- Born: July 13, 1852; Reading, Pennsylvania, U.S.
- Died: October 2, 1931 (aged 79); Philadelphia, Pennsylvania, U.S.
- Batted: Right Threw: Right

MLB debut
- May 4, 1875, for the St. Louis Brown Stockings

Last MLB appearance
- August 8, 1888, for the Baltimore Orioles

MLB statistics
- Win–loss record: 171–151
- Earned run average: 2.43
- Strikeouts: 671
- Batting average: .229
- Home runs: 3
- Runs batted in: 172
- Stats at Baseball Reference

Teams
- St. Louis Brown Stockings (1875–1876); Chicago White Stockings (1877); Troy Trojans (1879); Providence Grays (1880); Detroit Wolverines (1881); Cleveland Blues (1881–1883); Philadelphia Athletics (1883); Cincinnati Outlaw Reds (1884); Philadelphia Athletics (1886); Baltimore Orioles (1888)

Career highlights and awards
- NL ERA leader (1876); Pitched first no-hitter in MLB history on July 15, 1876

George Washington Bradley (July 13, 1852 – October 2, 1931), nicknamed "Grin", was an American professional baseball player who was a pitcher and infielder. He played for multiple teams in the early years of the National League, the oldest league still active in Major League Baseball (MLB) and the American Association. Bradley is noted for pitching the first no-hitter officially recognized by MLB, on July 15, 1876 for the St. Louis Brown Stockings. As a player, he was listed at 5 feet 10 inches (1.78 m) and 175 pounds (79 kg); he threw and batted right-handed.

== Baseball career ==
Bradley is credited as throwing the first official no-hit, no-run game in major league history. He pitched for the St. Louis Brown Stockings in the clubs victory over the Hartford Dark Blues on July 15, 1876. The score ended 2–0 without a hit being allowed by Bradley. That year, he completed 63 of the 64 games for St. Louis, winning 45 and leading the league with a 1.23 earned run average. Additionally, he also threw 16 shutouts, setting a record which has not been broken to date, although was tied in 1916, 40 years later, by Hall of Fame pitcher Grover Cleveland Alexander. Modern statistics, including Wins Above Replacement, rate him as one of the best pitchers in 1876.

After 1876, Bradley was not as effective as a pitcher and played mostly other positions after 1879. He was involved in professional baseball for 30 years, 19 of them with the Philadelphia Athletics. In 1883, he was the team's regular third baseman and also went 16–7 on the mound to help the A's win the American Association championship.

In 1887, he served as a player-manager for the Nashville Blues of the Southern League. He returned briefly to a major league, going hitless in one game for the Baltimore Orioles of the American Association in 1888. He continued to play in the minor leagues until 1890.

== Personal life ==
Bradley became a Philadelphia police officer following his baseball career. He retired in 1930. He was married and had four children.

He died at his home in Philadelphia, on October 2, 1931. At the time of his death at age 79, he was retired on a pension from the police department, which he had only begun receiving in September 1931.

Bradley was interred at the Northwood Cemetery in Philadelphia.

== See also ==
- List of Major League Baseball no-hitters

Achievements
Preceded by Joe Borden (not recognized by MLB)	No-hitter pitcher July 15, 1876	Succeeded by Lee Richmond
