= Charlie Reilley =

American baseball player (1856–1904)

- Catcher
- Born: 1856; Providence, Rhode Island, U.S.
- Died: November 4, 1904; Providence, Rhode Island, U.S.
- Batted: Right Threw: Right

MLB debut
- May 1, 1879, for the Troy Trojans

Last MLB appearance
- April 26, 1884, for the Boston Reds

MLB statistics
- Batting average: .210
- Hits: 92
- Runs: 35
- Stats at Baseball Reference

Teams
- Troy Trojans (1879); Cincinnati Stars (1880); Detroit Wolverines (1881); Worcester Ruby Legs (1881); Providence Grays (1882); Boston Reds (1884)

Charles Augustine Reilley (born Charlse Augustine O'Reilly; 1856 – November 4, 1904) was an American Major League Baseball player for parts of five seasons.

== Career ==
Charles was a catcher for most of his career, but did play in the outfield and occasionally some infield positions as well. He received his most significant playing time while in his rookie season in 1879 with the Troy Trojans of the National League, when he played in 62 games, and batted .229. From then, he played sparsely over the next three years, appearing in games for four different teams, and then after one season away from the majors, he appeared in the short-lived Union Association in 1884. He finished his career with 92 hits in 439 at bats for a .210 batting average, while playing in 119 games.

== Post-career ==
After his baseball career, one of his known occupations was a steam fitter. Charles died in his hometown of Providence and is interred at Mount St. Mary Cemetery in Pawtucket, Rhode Island.
