= Pop Smith =

Canadian baseball player (1856–1927)

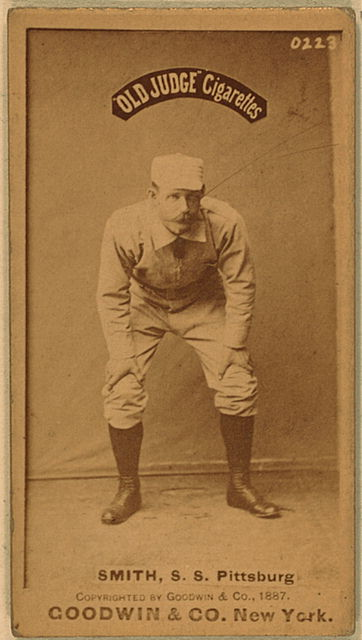
- 1887 baseball card of Smith
- Second baseman
- Born: October 12, 1856; Digby, Nova Scotia, Canada
- Died: April 18, 1927 (aged 70); Boston, Massachusetts, U.S.
- Batted: Right Threw: Right

MLB debut
- May 1, 1880, for the Cincinnati Stars

Last MLB appearance
- June 9, 1891, for the Washington Statesmen

MLB statistics
- Batting average: .222
- Home runs: 24
- Runs batted in: 358
- Stats at Baseball Reference

Teams
- Cincinnati Stars (1880); Cleveland Blues (1881); Buffalo Bisons (1881); Worcester Ruby Legs (1881); Philadelphia Athletics (1882); Louisville Eclipse (1882); Columbus Buckeyes (1883–1884); Pittsburgh Alleghenys (1885–1889); Boston Beaneaters (1889–1890); Washington Statesmen (1891)

Member of the Canadian

Baseball Hall of Fame
- Induction: 2005

Charles Marvin "Pop" Smith (October 12, 1856 – April 18, 1927) was a Canadian Major League Baseball player from Digby, Nova Scotia, Canada. He played as an infielder for 10 teams over his 12-year career, spanning from 1880 to 1891.

On April 17, 1890, Smith became the first player to go to the plate six times and not have an official at-bat. He received five walks and was hit by the pitch his last plate appearance.

Smith died in Boston, Massachusetts, at the age of 70, and was buried in Brighton's Evergreen Cemetery. In 2005, he was inducted into the Canadian Baseball Hall of Fame.

== See also ==
- List of Major League Baseball annual triples leaders
