= Chub Sullivan =

American baseball player (1856–1881)

- First baseman
- Born: January 12, 1856; Boston, Massachusetts, U.S.
- Died: September 12, 1881 (aged 25); Boston, Massachusetts, U.S.
- Batted: Right Threw: Right

MLB debut
- September 24, 1877, for the Cincinnati Reds

Last MLB appearance
- July 17, 1880, for the Worcester Worcesters

MLB statistics
- Batting average: .258
- Runs scored: 55
- Runs batted in: 24
- Stats at Baseball Reference

Teams
- Cincinnati Reds (1877–1878); Worcester Worcesters (1880)

Career highlights and awards
- Led the National League in games played, assists, and fielding percentage in 1878

John Frank "Chub" Sullivan (January 12, 1856 – September 12, 1881) was an American professional baseball player. A first baseman, he played for three seasons in the early years of the National League with the Cincinnati Reds and Worcester Worcesters. He was nicknamed "Chub", but was 6 feet (1.8 m) tall and weighed a mere 164 pounds (74 kg). During his career, he was a popular player, sometimes known as a clown for his antics, and an early pioneer of the slide.

== Career ==
As a 21-year-old rookie in 1877, Sullivan was the tenth-youngest player to appear in a National League game during that season, replacing Charlie Gould at first base. Joining the team late in the season, he played in only eight games, and batted .250. He stayed on with the Reds for the 1878 season, leading the league in games played, assists by a first baseman, and fielding percentage (.975). A tough hitter to strike out, Chub also finished seventh in at bat to strikeout ratio (27.1 to 1).

Sullivan joined the Worcester minor league club for the 1879 season, and the team did very well in a championship tournament following the season, and decided to apply as a replacement team in the National League, when the Syracuse Stars folded following the 1879 season. The team was accepted, and joined the League for the 1880 season. Sullivan played in 43 games, the last season of his career, batted .259, and is credited with zero RBIs. Sullivan's career totals include 112 games played, 114 hits, 55 runs scored, 24 RBIs, and a batting average of .258.

== Death ==
Sullivan became ill before the next season began, and eventually died on September 12 in his hometown of Boston at the age of 25 of consumption, later known as tuberculosis. His Worcester teammates wore a black crêpe on their jersey sleeves in his memory for the 1881 season.
