= Mike Moynahan =

American baseball player (1856–1899)

- Shortstop
- Born: 1856; Chicago, Illinois, U.S.
- Died: April 9, 1899; Chicago, Illinois, U.S.
- Batted: Left Threw: Right

MLB debut
- August 20, 1880, for the Buffalo Bisons

Last MLB appearance
- June 21, 1884, for the Cleveland Blues

MLB statistics
- Games played: 169
- Runs scored: 124
- Batting average: .294
- Stats at Baseball Reference

Teams
- Buffalo Bisons (1880); Cleveland Blues (1881); Detroit Wolverines (1881); Philadelphia Athletics(1883–1884); Cleveland Blues (1884)

Michael Moynahan (1856 – April 9, 1899) was an American professional baseball player from 1879 to 1886. He appeared in 169 games across four seasons in Major League Baseball, principally as a shortstop, for the Buffalo Bisons (1880), Detroit Wolverines (1881), Cleveland Blues (1881, 1884), and Philadelphia Athletics (1883–1884). He was the starting shortstop, and with a .310 batting average the leading hitter, for the 1883 Athletics team that won the American Association pennant with a 66–32 record.

== Early years ==
Moynahan was born in Chicago, Illinois in 1856.

== Professional baseball player ==
Moynahan began his career as a professional baseball player in 1879 with the Davenport Brown Stockings of the Northwestern League.

In August 1880, Moynahan made his major league debut with the Buffalo Bisons of the National League. He appeared in 27 games, all at shortstop for the Bisons, and compiled a .330 batting average.

During the 1881 season, Moynahan played for two National League clubs. He appeared in 33 games, 32 in the outfield, for the Cleveland Blues, and one game for the Detroit Wolverines. In total, he compiled a .230 average in 142 games during the 1881 season.

In 1882, Moynahan played minor league baseball for the Philadelphia Phillies, then part of the League Alliance. He returned to the major leagues in 1883 as a member of the Philadelphia Athletics of the American Association. Moynahan appeared in 95 games, all at shortstop, for the Athletics during the 1883 season, compiling a .310 batting average, scoring 90 runs, and hitting 18 doubles and 10 triples with 67 RBIs. He was the starting shortstop, and the leading hitter, for the 1883 Athletics team that won the American Association pennant with a 66–32 record. His teammates on the 1883 Athletics included Harry Stovey.

Moynahan began the 1884 season with the Athletics, but he was released on May 17, 1884, after appearing in only one game with the club. He was then signed as a free agent by the Cleveland Blues of the National League. He appeared in 13 games for the Blues in 1884 and compiled a .289 batting average before being released on June 23, 1884.

Although Moynahan's major league career ended in June 1884, he continued to play minor league baseball, including stints with the Milwaukee Brewers in 1884 and the Utica Pent Ups in 1885.

== Later years ==
Moynahan died in 1899 at age 43 in Chicago. He was buried at Mount Olivet Catholic Cemetery in that city.
