= Harry McCormick (baseball) =

American baseball player (1855–1889)

- Pitcher
- Born: October 25, 1855; Syracuse, New York, U.S.
- Died: August 8, 1889 (aged 33); Syracuse, New York, U.S.
- Batted: Right Threw: Right

MLB debut
- May 1, 1879, for the Syracuse Stars

Last MLB appearance
- September 20, 1883, for the Cincinnati Red Stockings

MLB statistics
- Win–loss record: 41-58
- Strikeouts: 157
- Earned run average: 2.66
- Stats at Baseball Reference

Teams
- Syracuse Stars 1879; Worcester Ruby Legs 1881; Cincinnati Red Stockings 1882–1883

Patrick Henry McCormick (October 25, 1855 – August 8, 1889) was an American pitcher in Major League Baseball in 1879, and from 1881 to 1883. McCormick died in his hometown of Syracuse, New York at the age of 33.

On July 26, 1879, McCormick, the Syracuse Stars' starting pitcher, hit a first-inning homer to beat Tommy Bond and the Boston Red Stockings, 1–0. This is the first and, most likely, will be the only occurrence in major league history that a pitcher will record a 1–0 victory with his own first inning round-tripper being the game's lone run.
