= Fred Corey =

American baseball player (1855–1912)

- Pitcher / Third baseman
- Born: 1855; Coventry, Rhode Island, U.S.
- Died: November 27, 1912 (aged 56–57); Providence, Rhode Island, U.S.
- Batted: Right Threw: Right

MLB debut
- May 1, 1878, for the Providence Grays

Last MLB appearance
- October 5, 1885, for the Philadelphia Athletics

MLB statistics
- Win–loss record: 27–46
- Earned run average: 3.32
- Batting average: .246
- Stats at Baseball Reference

Teams
- Providence Grays (1878); Worcester Ruby Legs (1880–1882); Philadelphia Athletics (1883–1885)

Frederick Harrison Corey (1855 – November 27, 1912) was an American pitcher and third baseman in Major League Baseball in 1878 and from 1880 through 1885, encompassing seven seasons. He played for the Providence Grays, Worcester Ruby Legs, and Philadelphia Athletics. Corey was born in Coventry, Rhode Island, and died in Providence, Rhode Island, and is interred at the North Burial Ground. Corey twice cost himself a potential home run by failing to touch third base: first, on 9/23/1880 vs. Boston, then again, on 9/17/1881 vs. Cleveland. "These would have been the first two homers in his career, which ended up with a total of seven."
