= James Sumner (baseball) =

American baseball umpire (1851-1881)

- Born: James Gaffield Sumner; August 16, 1851; Boston, Massachusetts, U.S.
- Died: April 21, 1881 (aged 29); Cambridge, Massachusetts, U.S.
- Years active: 1876–1878
- Employer: National League
- Known for: Baseball umpire

James Gaffield Sumner (August 16, 1851 – April 21, 1881) was an American professional umpire in Major League Baseball. He officiated 28 games as a National League umpire from 1876 until 1878.
