= Billy Taylor (1880s pitcher) =

American baseball player (1855–1900)

- Pitcher / Outfielder / Catcher
- Born: 1855; Washington, D.C., US
- Died: May 14, 1900; Jacksonville, Florida, US
- Batted: Right Threw: Right

MLB debut
- May 21, 1881, for the Worcester Ruby Legs

Last MLB appearance
- August 16, 1887, for the Philadelphia Athletics

MLB statistics
- Win–loss record: 50-36
- Earned run average: 3.17
- Batting average: .277
- Stats at Baseball Reference

Teams
- Worcester Ruby Legs (1881); Detroit Wolverines (1881); Cleveland Blues (1881); Pittsburgh Alleghenys (1882–1883); St. Louis Maroons (1884); Philadelphia Athletics (1885); Baltimore Orioles (1886); Philadelphia Athletics (1887)

William Henry "Bollicky Bill" Taylor (1855 – May 14, 1900) was an American pitcher, outfielder, and catcher in Major League Baseball. He played for the Worcester Ruby Legs, Detroit Wolverines, Cleveland Blues, Pittsburgh Alleghenys, St. Louis Maroons, Philadelphia Athletics, and Baltimore Orioles during the 1880s. Taylor was 5 ft 11 in (1.80 m) and weighed 208 lb (94 kg).

== Career ==
Taylor was born in 1855 in Washington, D.C. He started his professional baseball career in 1879 with the Northwestern League's Dubuque Red Stockings. The following year, he played for San Francisco of the California League.

In 1881, Taylor had stints with three teams in the National League. He made his major league debut on May 21 with the Worcester Ruby Legs, played six games for them, then appeared in one game for the Detroit Wolverines, and then appeared in 24 games for the Cleveland Blues. Mostly playing in the outfield, he batted .222 that year.

Taylor spent 1882 and 1883 with the American Association's Pittsburgh Alleghenys. He had arguably his best hitting season in 1882 when – splitting his time between five positions – he batted .281 and ranked third in the league with a .452 slugging percentage. In 1883, Taylor batted .260 and also appeared in 19 games as a pitcher. He led the league with nine games finished and went 4–7 with a 5.39 earned run average.

Taylor joined the new Union Association in 1884 as a member of the St. Louis Maroons. He was primarily a pitcher for St. Louis and went 25–4 on the mound with a 1.68 ERA in 263 innings. He ranked third in the league in wins, third in winning percentage, second in ERA, and first in saves (4). He also batted a career-high .366. In July, however, Taylor jumped to the American Association's Philadelphia Athletics. He pitched 260 more innings for Philadelphia, compiling an 18-12 record there with a 2.53 ERA. Taylor's 523 innings pitched in 1884 ended up being more than half of his major league career total of 799.2, and he never pitched more than 127 innings in any other season.

Taylor pitched six games for the Athletics in 1885, going 1–5. Joining the Baltimore Orioles in 1886, his record was even worse, at 1–6. Taylor also played in the Southern Association that year and went 3–7 while batting .100. In 1887, he went 7–3 and batted .269 for the Eastern League's New Haven Blues. He also pitched (and won) one game for the Athletics on August 16, which was his final major league appearance. Taylor then ended his career with two seasons in the minors.

Taylor died in Jacksonville, Florida, in 1900. He was 45 years old.

== See also ==
- List of Major League Baseball annual saves leaders
