= Cincinnati Stars =

1880 American baseball team

Information
- Location: Based in Cincinnati, Ohio
- Founded: 1880
- Folded: 1880
- Former league: National League
- Former ballpark: Bank Street Grounds (1880)
- Colors: Grey, red
- Ownership: Justus Thorner
- Manager: John Clapp (1880)

The Cincinnati Stars were a Major League Baseball team that played in the National League for the 1880 season and were managed by John Clapp. The club finished their only season in 8th place with a record of 21–59.

Following the 1880 campaign, the Stars were dropped from the NL after ownership refused to sign a league pledge that banned alcohol in league parks. The pledge also forbade clubs from renting their parks out on Sundays. Ownership begrudgingly did not contest the legality of their expulsion and the Stars were replaced with the Detroit Wolverines. Major League Baseball returned to Cincinnati in 1882 when the modern Reds were introduced.

== Year-by-year records ==
Season	Manager	Games	W	L	T	WP	PL	GB
1880	John Clapp	83	21	59	3	.263	8th	44.0

== Baseball Hall of Famers ==
Cincinnati Stars Hall of Famers
Inductee	Position	Tenure	Inducted
Deacon White	3B/C	1880	2013
