= Mike Dorgan =

American baseball player (1853–1909)

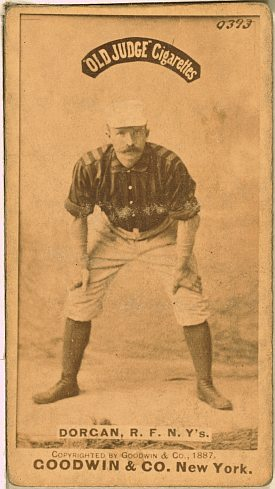
- 1887 baseball card of Dorgan
- Right fielder
- Born: October 2, 1853; Middletown, Connecticut, U.S.
- Died: April 26, 1909 (aged 55); Hartford, Connecticut, U.S.
- Batted: Right Threw: Right

MLB debut
- May 8, 1877, for the St. Louis Brown Stockings

Last MLB appearance
- June 9, 1890, for the Syracuse Stars

MLB statistics
- Batting average: .274
- Hits: 802
- Runs batted in: 346
- Stats at Baseball Reference

Teams
- As player: St. Louis Brown Stockings (1877); Syracuse Stars (1879); Providence Grays (1880); Worcester Ruby Legs (1881); Detroit Wolverines (1881); New York Gothams/Giants (1882–1887); Syracuse Stars (1890); As manager: Syracuse Stars (1879); Providence Grays (1880); Worcester Ruby Legs (1881)

Michael Cornelius Dorgan (October 2, 1853 – April 26, 1909) was an American professional baseball player and manager. He played 10 seasons in Major League Baseball, principally as an outfielder, including five seasons and 425 games with the New York Giants from 1883 to 1887. He was also a player-manager for three major league clubs from 1879 to 1881.

Dorgan appeared in 715 major league games, 600 of them as an outfielder, and compiled a .274 batting average with 112 doubles, 34 triples, four home runs, and 346 runs batted in.

== Early years ==
Dorgan was born in Middletown, Connecticut in 1853. His parents were Cornelius Dorgan and Mary (Cahill) Dorgan, both of whom were immigrants from Ireland. His younger brother, Jerry Dorgan, also played Major League Baseball.

== Professional baseball career ==
=== Minor leagues ===
Dorgan began his baseball career with Middletown in 1873. He next played for the Webster, Massachusetts "Clippers" in 1874. He played during the 1875 season with teams in Grafton and Lynn, Massachusetts.

In 1876, Dorgan played for the famous Syracuse Stars club that "won nearly every game played."

=== St. Louis ===
Dorgan made his major league debut in May 1877 with the St. Louis Brown Stockings of the National League. He appeared in 60 games for St. Louis, 50 of them as an outfielder, and compiled a .308 batting average with nine doubles, seven triples, and 23 RBI.

=== Syracuse ===
Dorgan returned to the Syracuse Stars for the 1878 and 1879 seasons. In 1879, the Stars joined the National League and attained major league status. Dorgan appeared in 59 games for the Stars in 1879, playing in the outfield (16 games) and at first base (21 games), third base (11 games), shortstop (six games), catcher (four games), pitcher (two games), and second base (one game). He compiled a .267 batting average with 11 doubles, five triples, a home run, and 17 RBI. Dorgan also served as the team's manager in 1879, leading the team to a 17–26 record.

=== Providence ===
In 1880, Dorgan played for the Providence Grays of the National League. He appeared in 79 games, 77 as an outfielder, and compiled a .246 batting average with 10 doubles, a triple, and 31 RBI. Dorgan was also the manager of the 1880 Providence team, compiling a 26–12 record.

=== Worcester and Detroit ===
In 1881, Dorgan played for the Worcester Ruby Legs and Detroit Wolverines, both of the National League. In 59 games with the two teams, 27 at first base and 28 in the outfield, Dorgan compiled a .272 batting average with six doubles and 23 RBI. He was the manager of the Worcester club for a portion of the 1881 season, leading the Ruby Legs to a 24–32 record.

=== New York Giants ===
In 1883, Dorgan joined the New York Giants and spent the next five years there. He appeared in 425 games with the Giants, over 400 of them as an outfielder. In his five seasons with the Giants, Dorgan compiled a .281 batting average with 255 runs scored, 68 doubles, 21 triples, three home runs, 234 RBI, and 31 stolen bases.

=== Return to Syracuse ===
Dorgan concluded his major league playing career in 1890 with the Syracuse Stars, then part of the American Association. Dorgan appeared in 33 games, all as an outfielder, and compiled a .216 batting average. He appeared in his last major league game on June 9, 1890, at age 36.

== Later years ==
After retiring from baseball, Dorgan owned and ran a cafe and worked as a bartender for a number of years. He was married to Jennie Dorgan, and they had two sons, William and Harry, and a daughter, Mary. At the time of the 1900 United States census, and also the 1905 New York Census, Dorgan was living in Syracuse, New York with his wife, Jennie, and three children and was employed as a "barkeeper." Dorgan later moved to Hartford, Connecticut, where he worked for the American Bridge Company.

In February 1909, Dorgan underwent an operation on his knee to repair an old baseball injury. He developed blood poisoning and died at St. Francis Hospital in Hartford, Connecticut six weeks after the operation. Dorgan was age 55 when he died. He was buried at St. Agnes Cemetery in Syracuse, New York. His obituary stated that he was "at one time known as the greatest all around baseball player in the United States."

Dorgan was posthumously inducted into the Syracuse Hall of Fame in 1999.
