= Worcester Worcesters =

19th-century Major League Baseball team

- Founded: 1879
- Dissolved: 1882
- League: National League (1880–1882); National Association (1879)
- Location: Worcester, Massachusetts
- Ballpark: Worcester Driving Park Grounds
- Colors: Ruby, brown
- Manager: Jack Chapman (1882); Tommy Bond (1882); Freeman Brown (1882); Harry Stovey (1881); Mike Dorgan (1881); Frank Bancroft (1879–1880)

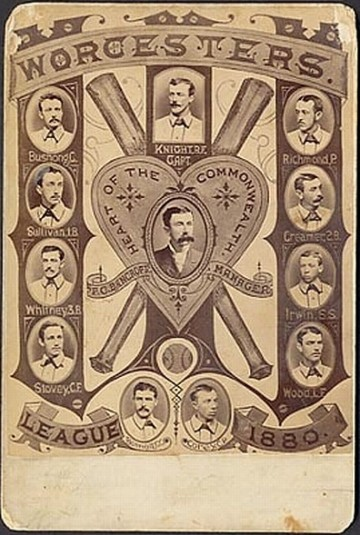
The 1880 Worcesters

The Worcester Worcesters were a 19th-century Major League Baseball team from 1880 to 1882 in the National League. The team is referred to, at times, as the Brown Stockings or the Ruby Legs; however, no contemporary sources from the time exist that support the use of either name. The team played their home games at the Worcester Driving Park Grounds in the Worcester Agricultural Fairgrounds, located south of Highland Street between Sever Street and Russell Street in Worcester, Massachusetts.

== History ==
In 1879, Worcester played in the National Association, a league consisting of teams in the Northeast. The National League was interested in Worcester as a potential replacement for the failed Syracuse Stars franchise primarily based on the performance of their ace pitcher, Lee Richmond, who pitched several exhibition games against National League opponents and went 6–2. He also pitched and won one game for the Boston Red Stockings. To admit Worcester to the National League, the league's board of directors waived the requirement that league cities have a population of at least 75,000 (Worcester's population was 58,000). To raise the capital to support their entry into the major leagues, the team sold shares for $35 (with the price including a season ticket), sponsored a walking race that attracted 3,000 people, arranged for discount packages of train fare and baseball tickets for fans from outside the city, and held benefit concerts and dramatic performances.

In December 1879, Worcester became the first professional baseball team to visit Cuba. The trip was a financial failure, as they were only able to play two games against Cuban teams.

On June 12, 1880, Lee Richmond threw the first perfect game in Major League history, against the Cleveland Blues. A monument to the perfect game stands on the grounds of the Becker School of Design & Technology of Clark University at 61 Sever Street in Worcester. The inscription reads:

On June 12, 1880, the first perfect game in professional baseball history was pitched on this site (the former Worcester Agricultural Fairgrounds) by J. Lee Richmond of Worcester against Cleveland in a National League game.

The team made history again on August 20 of the same year, by becoming the first team to be no-hit at home, when Pud Galvin of the Buffalo Bisons defeated them 1–0.

According to Lee Allen, Cincinnati writer and eventual director of the Baseball Hall of Fame, the Worcester club impacted the National League in another way in 1880; it was instrumental in having the Cincinnati Reds expelled from the league after the season, due to violations of the league rules against selling beer at the ballpark. In his 1948 book, The Cincinnati Reds (published by Putnam), Allen took some satisfaction in pointing out that the Reds re-formed in 1882, initially as a member of the American Association, the same year that Worcester's days as a major league franchise, as well as their influence, came to an end.

Worcester proved to be too small to support a major league club; the team was encouraged to finish out its schedule as a lame duck before voluntarily resigning from the league. Their last two games of the season against the Troy Trojans, which also resigned from the NL for the same reasons, drew only 6 and 25 fans respectively; the attendance of six is a record low attendance for all league games open to spectators. The Worcester club formally tendered its resignation to the National League at the circuit's annual meeting in Providence on December 6, 1882. The club was placed on the league's roll of honorary membership.

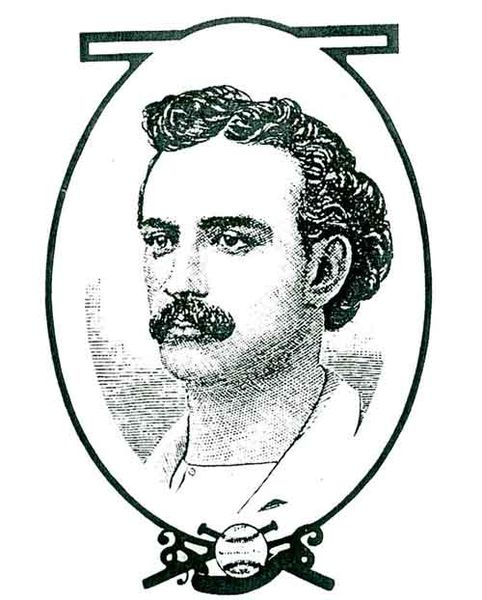
Lip Pike, four-time MLB home run champion

Needing an eighth team to balance the schedule, the National League granted an expansion franchise to Philadelphia, known as the Philadelphia Quakers. This team would evolve into the Philadelphia Phillies (a name used interchangeably with Quakers until 1890). Many sources, including the Phillies themselves, suggest that the Worcester club was moved to Philadelphia; however, only Worcester's former NL spot was moved. There is no direct link between the two teams, since Worcester resigned from the National League, and the franchise was not sold and moved to Philadelphia. One of the items on the agenda at the December 1882 annual meeting was whether to award new franchises to New York and Philadelphia. Further, no players from the 1882 Worcester club played for the Philadelphia team in 1883.

== Notable alumni ==
- Lip Pike, four-time Major League Baseball home run champion
- Lee Richmond, first player to throw a perfect game

== Baseball Hall of Famers ==
Worcester Worcesters Hall of Famers
Inductee	Position	Tenure	Inducted
John Clarkson	P	1882	1963

== See also ==
- 1880 Worcester Worcesters season
- 1881 Worcester Worcesters season
- 1882 Worcester Worcesters season
- Worcester Worcesters all-time roster
