= 1887 Major League Baseball season =

1887 MLB season
- League: American Association (AA); National League (NL)
- Sport: Baseball
- Duration: Regular season: April 16 – October 10, 1887 (AA); April 28 – October 8, 1887 (NL); World's Championship Series: October 10–26, 1887
- Games: 140 (AA); 126 (NL)
- Teams: 16 (8 per league)

Pennant winner
- AA champions: St. Louis Browns
- AA runners-up: Cincinnati Red Stockings
- NL champions: Detroit Wolverines
- NL runners-up: Philadelphia Quakers

World's Championship Series
- Venue: Recreation Park, Detroit, Michigan; Sportsman's Park, St. Louis, Missouri
- Champions: Detroit Wolverines
- Runners-up: St. Louis Browns

MLB seasons
- ← 1886 1888 →

Locations of teams for the 1887 American Association season
American Association
Locations of teams for the 1887 National League season
National League

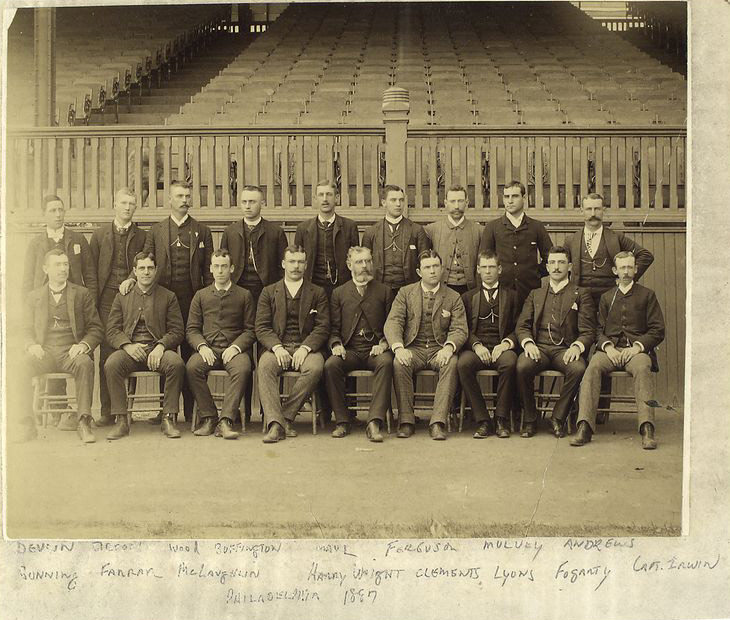
Philadelphia Phillies team photo, 1887

The 1887 major league baseball season began on April 16, 1887. The regular season ended on October 10, with the Detroit Wolverines and the St. Louis Browns as regular season champions of the National League and American Association, respectively. The postseason began with Game 1 of the fourth World's Championship Series on October 10 and ended with Game 15 on October 26, in what was a best-of-fifteen-playoff, played across 10 cities. The Wolverines defeated the Browns, ten games to five (and clinching on Game 11), capturing their first World's Championship Series.

The Louisville Colonels set a Major League record which still stands for the most base on balls for a team in a game, with 19 against the Cleveland Blues on 21 September.

Over the offseason, the National League's Kansas City Cowboys folded, and saw them replaced by the American Association's Pittsburgh Alleghenys. In place of the Alleghenys leaving the AA for the NL, the Cleveland Blues were enfranchised. Meanwhile, the St. Louis Maroons relocated to Indianapolis, Indiana as the Indianapolis Hoosiers.

== The color line is drawn ==
On July 14, Chicago was to play an exhibition game against the Eastern League Newark team, who were set to play black players Moses Fleetwood Walker (who formerly played in the majors in 1884 three years prior) and George Stovey (who the New York Giants had their eyes on signing). With threats from Chicago to not play against Newark if Walker and Stovey played, they were substituted for the game. Between Chicago's financial threats to not play against teams with people of color and other minor league teams creating petitions to force teams to release players of color, Organized Baseball effectively set up the baseball color line.

The color line would remain firm for 60 years until the Brooklyn Dodgers called up Jackie Robinson in 1947, breaking the color line. The process of integration would then last for another 12 years until 1959, when the last major league team, the Boston Red Sox integrated by calling up Pumpsie Green.

== Schedule ==
The 1887 schedule consisted of 140 games for all American Association teams and 126 games for all National League, each of which had eight teams. Each AA team was scheduled to play 20 games against the other seven teams, while each NL team was scheduled to play 18 games against the other seven teams. Both the AA's 140-game format and NL's 126-game format were continued from their implementation the previous season. The NL would adopt the AA's format the following season, and each league would use this 140-game format until 1892.

American Association Opening Day took place on April 16 featuring all eight teams, while National League Opening Day took place on April 27, featuring four teams. The American Association would see its final day of the regular season on October 10 with four teams, while the National League would see its final day of the season on October 8, featuring all eight teams. The 1887 World's Championship Series took place between October 10 and October 26.

== Rule changes ==
The 1887 season saw many radical changes which affected the game, as well as unity on rules by the American Association and National League. The following rule changes were made:

- The pitcher's box was reduced to 4 feet by 5 1/2 feet.
- The ability for batters to call for high and low pitches was abolished. In lieu of this, the strike zone was doubled in size, and established to be between the shoulders and knees.
- The choice of who hits and pitches in each half of the inning is given to home team captain.
- Five balls became a base on balls, down from six in the AA and seven in the NL.
- Four "called strikes" were adopted for this season only, up from three.
- Bases on balls were recorded as hits for this season only (a change which would dramatically increase players' batting averages). The batting average as calculated in 1887 is very similar to the modern on-base percentage (OBP) (the difference being that OBP uses total plate appearances as the denominator, which includes hit by pitches and sacrifice flies, the latter of which was not recorded and was implemented in 1894).
- In the National League the batter was awarded first base when hit by a pitch. The change was already implemented by the American Association in 1884.
- Home plate was to be made of rubber only - dropping the marble type and was to be 12 inches square.
- The pitcher must now keep his back foot on the rear line of the pitcher's box (55 1/2 feet from middle of home plate).
- Coaches were recognized by the rules for the first time ever.
- First and third base were repositioned to be entirely in fair territory.
- The reserve role was expanded so clubs controlled all 14 players on the roster (expanded from 12).

== Teams ==
| League | Team | City | Ballpark | Capacity | Manager |
|---|---|---|---|---|---|
| American Association | Baltimore Orioles | Oxford, Maryland | Oriole Park | 5,000 | Billy Barnie |
| American Association | Brooklyn Grays | Brooklyn, New York | Washington Park | 3,000 | Charlie Byrne |
| American Association | Cincinnati Red Stockings | Cincinnati, Ohio | American Park | 3,000 | Gus Schmelz |
| American Association | Cleveland Blues | Cleveland, Ohio | National League Park | Unknown | Jimmy Williams |
| American Association | Louisville Colonels | Louisville, Kentucky | Eclipse Park | 5,860 | Kick Kelly |
| American Association | New York Metropolitans | St. George, New York | St. George Grounds | 5,100 | Bob Ferguson |
| American Association | New York Metropolitans | St. George, New York | St. George Grounds | 5,100 | Dave Orr |
| American Association | New York Metropolitans | St. George, New York | St. George Grounds | 5,100 | Ollie Caylor |
| American Association | Philadelphia Athletics | Philadelphia, Pennsylvania | Jefferson Street Grounds | 15,000 | Frank Bancroft |
| American Association | Philadelphia Athletics | Philadelphia, Pennsylvania | Jefferson Street Grounds | 15,000 | Charlie Mason |
| American Association | St. Louis Browns | St. Louis, Missouri | Sportsman's Park | 3,000 | Charles Comiskey |
| National League | Boston Beaneaters | Boston, Massachusetts | South End Grounds | 3,000 | King Kelly |
| National League | Boston Beaneaters | Boston, Massachusetts | South End Grounds | 3,000 | John Morrill |
| National League | Chicago White Stockings | Chicago, Illinois | West Side Park | 6,000 | Cap Anson |
| National League | Detroit Wolverines | Detroit, Michigan | Recreation Park (Detroit) | Unknown | Bill Watkins |
| National League | Indianapolis Hoosiers | Indianapolis, Indiana | Seventh Street Park | Unknown | Watch Burnham |
| National League | Indianapolis Hoosiers | Indianapolis, Indiana | Seventh Street Park | Unknown | Fred Thomas |
| National League | Indianapolis Hoosiers | Indianapolis, Indiana | Seventh Street Park | Unknown | Horace Fogel |
| National League | New York Giants | New York, New York | Polo Grounds | 20,709 | Jim Mutrie |
| National League | Philadelphia Quakers | Philadelphia, Pennsylvania | Philadelphia Base Ball Grounds | 12,500 | Harry Wright |
| National League | Pittsburgh Alleghenys | Allegheny, Pennsylvania | Recreation Park (Pittsburgh) | 17,000 | Horace Phillips |
| National League | Washington Nationals | Washington, D.C. | Swampoodle Grounds | 6,000 | John Gaffney |

=== Neutral site and Sunday games ===
Two teams played in two neutral site games in which they were treated as the home team. Meanwhile, blue laws restricted Sunday activities in several localities, causing several teams of the American Association (which was informally referred to as the "Beer & Whiskey League" due to its openness on alcohol, compared to the National League) to play at ballparks in a different locality.

| Team | City | Ballpark | Capacity | Games played | Type |
|---|---|---|---|---|---|
| Brooklyn Grays | Ridgewood, New York | Ridgewood Park | 10,000 | 15 | Sunday |
| Cleveland Blues | Cleveland, Ohio | Cedar Avenue Driving Park | Unknown | 1 | Sunday |
| New York Metropolitans | Weehawken, New Jersey | Monitor Grounds | Unknown | 1 | Sunday |
| New York Metropolitans | Brooklyn, New York | Washington Park | 3,000 | 1 | Neutral site |
| Washington Nationals | Worcester, Massachusetts | Agricultural County Fair Grounds | Unknown | 1 | Neutral site |

1. In today's Baltimore, Maryland.
2. In today's New York, New York.
3. In today's Pittsburgh, Pennsylvania.

== Standings ==
=== American Association ===
American Association
| Team | W | L | Pct. | GB | Home | Road |
|---|---|---|---|---|---|---|
| St. Louis Browns | 95 | 40 | .704 | — | 58‍–‍15 | 37‍–‍25 |
| Cincinnati Red Stockings | 81 | 54 | .600 | 14 | 46‍–‍27 | 35‍–‍27 |
| Baltimore Orioles | 77 | 58 | .570 | 18 | 42‍–‍21 | 35‍–‍37 |
| Louisville Colonels | 76 | 60 | .559 | 19½ | 45‍–‍23 | 31‍–‍37 |
| Philadelphia Athletics | 64 | 69 | .481 | 30 | 41‍–‍28 | 23‍–‍41 |
| Brooklyn Grays | 60 | 74 | .448 | 34½ | 36‍–‍37 | 24‍–‍37 |
| New York Metropolitans | 44 | 89 | .331 | 50 | 26‍–‍33 | 18‍–‍56 |
| Cleveland Blues | 39 | 92 | .298 | 54 | 22‍–‍36 | 17‍–‍56 |

=== National League ===
National League
| Team | W | L | Pct. | GB | Home | Road |
|---|---|---|---|---|---|---|
| Detroit Wolverines | 79 | 45 | .637 | — | 44‍–‍17 | 35‍–‍28 |
| Philadelphia Quakers | 75 | 48 | .610 | 3½ | 38‍–‍23 | 37‍–‍25 |
| Chicago White Stockings | 71 | 50 | .587 | 6½ | 44‍–‍18 | 27‍–‍32 |
| New York Giants | 68 | 55 | .553 | 10½ | 36‍–‍26 | 32‍–‍29 |
| Boston Beaneaters | 61 | 60 | .504 | 16½ | 38‍–‍22 | 23‍–‍38 |
| Pittsburgh Alleghenys | 55 | 69 | .444 | 24 | 31‍–‍33 | 24‍–‍36 |
| Washington Nationals | 46 | 76 | .377 | 32 | 26‍–‍33 | 20‍–‍43 |
| Indianapolis Hoosiers | 37 | 89 | .294 | 43 | 24‍–‍39 | 13‍–‍50 |

=== Tie games ===
30 tie games (14 in AA, 16 in NL), which are not factored into winning percentage or games behind (and were often replayed again), occurred throughout the season.

==== American Association ====
- Baltimore Orioles, 6
- Brooklyn Grays, 4
- Cincinnati Red Stockings, 1
- Cleveland Blues, 2
- Louisville Colonels, 3
- New York Metropolitans, 5
- Philadelphia Athletics, 4
- St. Louis Browns, 3

==== National League ====
- Boston Beaneaters, 6
- Chicago White Stockings, 6
- Detroit Wolverines, 3
- Indianapolis Hoosiers, 1
- New York Giants, 6
- Philadelphia Quakers, 5
- Pittsburgh Alleghenys, 1
- Washington Nationals, 4

== Postseason ==
=== Bracket ===
| World's Championship Series |
| AA | St. Louis Browns | 6 | 3 | 1 | 0 | 5 | 0 | 1 | 2 | 2 | 11 | 3 | 5^{7} | 3 | 3 | 9^{6} |
| NL | Detroit Wolverines | 1 | 5 | 2^{13}* | 8 | 2 | 9 | 3 | 9 | 4 | 4 | 13† | 1 | 6 | 4 | 2 |

*Denotes walk-off
†Denotes eighth win by Detroit, clinching series

== Managerial changes ==
=== Off-season ===
| Team | Former Manager | New Manager |
|---|---|---|
| Boston Beaneaters | John Morrill | King Kelly |
| Cincinnati Red Stockings | Ollie Caylor | Gus Schmelz |
| Indianapolis Hoosiers | Gus Schmelz | Watch Burnham |
| Kansas City Cowboys | Dave Rowe | Team folded |
| Louisville Colonels | Jim Hart | Kick Kelly |
| Philadelphia Athletics | Bill Sharsig | Frank Bancroft |

=== In-season ===
| Team | Former Manager | New Manager |
|---|---|---|
| Boston Beaneaters | King Kelly | John Morrill |
| Indianapolis Hoosiers | Watch Burnham | Fred Thomas |
| Indianapolis Hoosiers | Fred Thomas | Horace Fogel |
| New York Metropolitans | Bob Ferguson | Dave Orr |
| New York Metropolitans | Dave Orr | Ollie Caylor |
| Philadelphia Athletics | Frank Bancroft | Charlie Mason |

== League leaders ==
In 1887, bases on balls (walks) were counted as hits by the major leagues in existence at the time. This inflated batting averages, with 11 players batting .400 or better, and the experiment was abandoned the following season. Historical statistics for the season were later revised, such that "Bases on balls shall always be treated as neither a time at bat nor a hit for the batter." This results in ambiguity for some players' season and career hits totals, notably with Cap Anson. Anson was credited with a .421 average and the National League batting title in 1887; however, the recalculation of averages with walks excluded lowered his average to .347 and retroactively gave the batting title to Sam Thompson. The 1887 batting average and hits are included below, using contemporary data on Baseball Reference.

=== American Association ===
Hitting leaders
| Stat | Player | Total |
|---|---|---|
| AVG | Tip O'Neill^{1} (STL) | .435 |
| AVG (1887) | Tip O'Neill (STL) | .485 |
| OPS | Tip O'Neill (STL) | 1.180 |
| HR | Tip O'Neill^{1} (STL) | 14 |
| RBI | Tip O'Neill^{1} (STL) | 123 |
| R | Tip O'Neill (STL) | 167 |
| H | Tip O'Neill (STL) | 225 |
| H (1887) | Pete Browning (LOU); Tip O'Neill (STL) | 275 |
| SB | Hugh Nicol^{2} (CIN) | 138 |

^{1} American Association Triple Crown batting winner
^{2} All-time single-season stolen bases record

Pitching leaders
| Stat | Player | Total |
|---|---|---|
| W | Matt Kilroy (BAL) | 46 |
| L | Al Mays (NYM) | 34 |
| ERA | Elmer Smith (CIN) | 2.94 |
| K | Toad Ramsey (LOU) | 355 |
| IP | Matt Kilroy (BAL) | 589.1 |
| SV | Adonis Terry (BRO) | 3 |
| WHIP | Bob Caruthers (STL) | 1.167 |

=== National League ===
Hitting leaders
| Stat | Player | Total |
|---|---|---|
| AVG | Sam Thompson (DET) | .372 |
| AVG (1887) | Cap Anson (CHI) | .421 |
| OPS | Dan Brouthers (DET) | .988 |
| HR | Billy O'Brien (WAS) | 19 |
| RBI | Sam Thompson (DET) | 166 |
| R | Dan Brouthers (DET) | 153 |
| H | Sam Thompson (DET) | 203 |
| H (1887) | Dan Brouthers (DET) | 240 |
| SB | John Montgomery Ward (NYG) | 111 |

Pitching leaders
| Stat | Player | Total |
|---|---|---|
| W | John Clarkson (CHI) | 35 |
| L | Egyptian Healy (IND) | 29 |
| ERA | Dan Casey (PHI) | 2.86 |
| K | John Clarkson (CHI) | 237 |
| IP | John Clarkson (CHI) | 523.0 |
| SV | Mark Baldwin (CHI); Frederick Fass (IND); Charlie Ferguson (PHI); Bob Pettit (CHI); Bill Stemmyer (BSN); Mike Tiernan (NYG); Larry Twitchell (DET); George Van Haltren (CHI) | 1 |
| WHIP | Tim Keefe (NYG) | 1.124 |

== Milestones ==
=== Batters ===
==== Cycles ====
- Tip O'Neill (STL):
  - O'Neill hit for his first cycle and first in franchise history, on April 30 against the Cleveland Blues.
  - O'Neill hit for his second cycle and second in franchise history, on May 7 against the Louisville Colonels. He is the first player to hit two cycles in a single season.
- Fred Carroll (PIT):
  - Carroll hit for his first cycle and first in franchise history, on May 2 against the Detroit Wolverines.
- Candy Nelson (NYG/NYM):
  - Set a Major League record for starting three double plays as a part of the New York Metropolitans in a single game on June 9 against the Louisville Colonels.
- Dave Orr (NYM):
  - Orr hit for his second cycle and second in franchise history, on August 10 against the Baltimore Orioles.
- Bid McPhee (CIN):
  - McPhee hit for his first cycle and third in franchise history, and the second reverse cycle in major league history on August 26 against the Baltimore Orioles.

==== Other batting accomplishments ====
- King Kelly / Ezra Sutton (BSN):
  - Set a Major League record for most runs scored in a game by two teammates, scoring six times each in a 28–14 win against the Pittsburgh Alleghenys on August 27.

=== Pitchers ===
- Bill George (NYG):
  - Set a Major League record for most walks in a single game, walking 16 batters in a 12–11 loss to the Chicago White Stockings on May 30.
- George Van Haltren (CHI):
  - Tied a Major League record for most walks in a single game, walking 16 batters in a 17–11 loss to the Boston Beaneaters on June 27.

=== Miscellaneous ===
- Philadelphia Quakers / Detroit Wolverines:
  - Set a Major League record by scoring in 15 of 18 half-innings in a game on July 1.
- Jocko Milligan (PHA):
  - Set a Major League record for most assists by a catcher in one inning against the Cincinnati Red Stockings, on July 26.
- New York Metropolitans:
  - Became the first Major League team to use five pitchers in a single game in a 25–11 loss to the Louisville Colonels on August 31.

== Venues ==
The Cleveland Blues join the American Association and play at National League Park in Cleveland, Ohio.

The 1887 season saw two teams relocate to new ballparks:

- The Indianapolis Hooisers, newly relocated from St. Louis, Missouri where they played as the St. Louis Maroons, leave Union Base Ball Park after playing their for three seasons, moving into Seventh Street Park where they would play for three seasons through 1889 before proceeding to fold.
- The Philadelphia Quakers leave Recreation Park (where they played for four seasons) and move to Philadelphia Base Ball Grounds, where they would go on to play for 52 seasons through 1938.

The first structure of the South End Grounds, home of the Boston Beaneaters, would see its last game on September 10, seeing a completely new structure built over the following offseason.

For various reasons, two teams would play home games at neutral sites:

- The Washington Nationals play a game in Worcester, Massachusetts against the Boston Beaneaters in a game rescheduled from a rainout in Washington, D.C. They play at the home of the former Worcester Worcesters at the Agricultural County Fair Grounds on August 17.
- The New York Metropolitans play a game at the home of the Brooklyn Grays in Brooklyn, New York at Washington Park on October 8.

Three teams of the American Association hosted Sunday games:

- The Brooklyn Grays played 15 games at Ridgewood Park in Ridgewood, New York on April 27, June 5, 12, 19, 26, July 24, 31, August 7, 14, September 4, 11, 18, 25, October 2 and 9.
- The Cleveland Blues played one game at Cedar Avenue Driving Park in Cleveland, Ohio on August 21.
- The New York Metropolitans played one game at Monitor Grounds in Weehawken, New Jersey on September 11.

== See also ==
- 1887 in baseball (Events, Births, Deaths)
