= 1887 New York Giants season =

1887 New York Giants
- League: National League
- Ballpark: Polo Grounds
- City: New York City
- Record: 68–55 (.553)
- League place: 4th
- Owner: John B. Day
- Manager: Jim Mutrie

The 1887 New York Giants season was the franchise's fifth season. The team finished in fourth place in the National League with a record of 68–55, 10 1/2 games behind the Detroit Wolverines. The team amassed 415 stolen bases, the most for any team in the history of the National League.

== Regular season ==
=== Season standings ===
National League
Team	W	L	Pct.	GB	Home	Road
Detroit Wolverines	79	45	.637	—	44‍–‍17	35‍–‍28
Philadelphia Quakers	75	48	.610	3½	38‍–‍23	37‍–‍25
Chicago White Stockings	71	50	.587	6½	44‍–‍18	27‍–‍32
New York Giants	68	55	.553	10½	36‍–‍26	32‍–‍29
Boston Beaneaters	61	60	.504	16½	38‍–‍22	23‍–‍38
Pittsburgh Alleghenys	55	69	.444	24	31‍–‍33	24‍–‍36
Washington Nationals	46	76	.377	32	26‍–‍33	20‍–‍43
Indianapolis Hoosiers	37	89	.294	43	24‍–‍39	13‍–‍50

=== Record vs. opponents ===
1887 National League record Sources:
Team	BSN	CHI	DET	IND	NYG	PHI	PIT	WAS
Boston	—	6–9–3	17–11–1	11–7	7–10–1	9–9	11–7	10–7–1
Chicago	9–6–3	—	10–8	13–5	11–6–1	12–6–1	5–12–1	11–7
Detroit	11–7–1	8–10	—	14–4–1	10–8	10–8	13–4	13–4–1
Indianapolis	7–11	5–13	4–14–1	—	3–15	1–17	7–11	10–8
New York	10–7–1	6–11–1	8–10	15–3	—	7–10–3	12–6	10–8–1
Philadelphia	9–9	6–12–1	8–10	17–1	10–7–3	—	12–6	13–3–1
Pittsburgh	7–11	12–5–1	4–13	11–7	6–12	6–12	—	9–9
Washington	7–10–1	7–11	4–13–1	8–10	8–10–1	3–13–1	9–9	—

=== Roster ===
1887 New York Giants
Roster
Pitchers: Bill George; Tim Keefe; Mike Mattimore; John Roach; Bill Swarback; Ledell Titcomb; Mickey Welch; Stump Weidman	Catchers: William Brown; Pat Deasley; Pat Murphy; Jim O'Rourke; Infielders: Buck Becannon; Roger Carey; Roger Connor; Buck Ewing; Joe Gerhardt; Gil Hatfield; Candy Nelson; John Rainey; Danny Richardson; John Ward	Outfielders: Mike Dorgan; Patrick Gillespie; George Gore; Mike Tiernan	Manager: Jim Mutrie

== Player stats ==
=== Batting ===
==== Starters by position ====
Note: Pos = Position; G = Games played; AB = At bats; H = Hits; Avg. = Batting average; HR = Home runs; RBI = Runs batted in

Pos	Player	G	AB	H	Avg.	HR	RBI
C	William Brown	49	170	37	.218	0	25
1B	Roger Connor	127	471	134	.285	17	104
2B	Danny Richardson	122	450	125	.278	3	62
SS	John Montgomery Ward	129	545	184	.338	1	53
3B	Buck Ewing	77	318	97	.305	6	44
OF	Mike Dorgan	71	283	73	.258	0	34
OF	George Gore	111	459	133	.290	1	49
OF	Mike Tiernan	103	407	117	.287	10	62

==== Other batters ====
Note: G = Games played; AB = At bats; H = Hits; Avg. = Batting average; HR = Home runs; RBI = Runs batted in

Player	G	AB	H	Avg.	HR	RBI
Jim O'Rourke	103	397	113	.285	3	88
Patrick Gillespie	76	295	78	.264	3	37
Pat Deasley	30	118	37	.314	0	23
John Rainey	17	58	17	.293	0	12
Pat Murphy	17	56	12	.214	0	4
Gil Hatfield	2	7	3	.429	0	3
Buck Becannon	1	5	0	.000	0	0
Roger Carey	1	4	0	.000	0	2
Joe Gerhardt	1	4	0	.000	0	0
Candy Nelson	1	2	0	.000	0	0

=== Pitching ===
==== Starting pitchers ====
Note: G = Games pitched; IP = Innings pitched; W = Wins; L = Losses; ERA = Earned run average; SO = Strikeouts

Player	G	IP	W	L	ERA	SO
Tim Keefe	56	476.2	35	19	3.12	189
Mickey Welch	41	346.0	22	15	3.36	115
Bill George	13	108.0	3	9	5.25	49
Ledell Titcomb	9	72.0	4	3	3.88	34
Mike Mattimore	7	57.1	3	3	2.35	12
Bill Swarback	2	16.0	0	2	5.06	6
John Roach	1	8.0	0	1	11.25	3
Stump Weidman	1	8.0	0	1	1.13	4

==== Relief pitchers ====
Note: G = Games pitched; W = Wins; L = Losses; SV = Saves; ERA = Earned run average; SO = Strikeouts

Player	G	W	L	SV	ERA	SO
Mike Tiernan	5	1	2	1	8.69	3
Danny Richardson	1	0	0	0	---	0
