= 1887 Washington Nationals season =

1887 Washington Nationals
- League: National League
- Ballpark: Swampdoodle Grounds
- City: Washington, D.C.
- Record: 46–76 (.377)
- League place: 7th
- Manager: John Gaffney

The 1887 Washington Nationals finished with a 46–76 record in the National League, finishing in seventh place.

== Regular season ==
=== Season standings ===
National League
Team	W	L	Pct.	GB	Home	Road
Detroit Wolverines	79	45	.637	—	44‍–‍17	35‍–‍28
Philadelphia Quakers	75	48	.610	3½	38‍–‍23	37‍–‍25
Chicago White Stockings	71	50	.587	6½	44‍–‍18	27‍–‍32
New York Giants	68	55	.553	10½	36‍–‍26	32‍–‍29
Boston Beaneaters	61	60	.504	16½	38‍–‍22	23‍–‍38
Pittsburgh Alleghenys	55	69	.444	24	31‍–‍33	24‍–‍36
Washington Nationals	46	76	.377	32	26‍–‍33	20‍–‍43
Indianapolis Hoosiers	37	89	.294	43	24‍–‍39	13‍–‍50

=== Record vs. opponents ===
1887 National League record Sources:
Team	BSN	CHI	DET	IND	NYG	PHI	PIT	WAS
Boston	—	6–9–3	17–11–1	11–7	7–10–1	9–9	11–7	10–7–1
Chicago	9–6–3	—	10–8	13–5	11–6–1	12–6–1	5–12–1	11–7
Detroit	11–7–1	8–10	—	14–4–1	10–8	10–8	13–4	13–4–1
Indianapolis	7–11	5–13	4–14–1	—	3–15	1–17	7–11	10–8
New York	10–7–1	6–11–1	8–10	15–3	—	7–10–3	12–6	10–8–1
Philadelphia	9–9	6–12–1	8–10	17–1	10–7–3	—	12–6	13–3–1
Pittsburgh	7–11	12–5–1	4–13	11–7	6–12	6–12	—	9–9
Washington	7–10–1	7–11	4–13–1	8–10	8–10–1	3–13–1	9–9	—

=== Roster ===
1887 Washington Nationals
Roster
Pitchers: Frank Gilmore; George Keefe; Hank O'Day; Dupee Shaw; Jim Whitney; Catchers: Pat Dealy; Barney Gilligan; Connie Mack; Bill Wright	Infielders: Sam Crane; Jim Donnelly; Jack Farrell; John Irwin; Bill Krieg; Al Myers; Billy O'Brien; Pete O'Brien	Outfielders: Cliff Carroll; Ed Daily; Paul Hines; George Shoch	Manager: John Gaffney

== Player stats ==
=== Batting ===
==== Starters by position ====
Note: Pos = Position; G = Games played; AB = At bats; H = Hits; Avg. = Batting average; HR = Home runs; RBI = Runs batted in

Pos	Player	G	AB	H	Avg.	HR	RBI
C	Connie Mack	82	314	63	.201	0	20
1B	Billy O'Brien	113	453	126	.278	19	73
2B	Al Myers	105	362	84	.232	2	36
SS	Jack Farrell	87	339	75	.221	0	41
3B	Jim Donnelly	117	425	85	.200	1	46
OF	Cliff Carroll	103	420	104	.248	4	37
OF	Paul Hines	123	478	147	.308	10	72
OF	Ed Daily	78	311	78	.251	2	36

==== Other batters ====
Note: G = Games played; AB = At bats; H = Hits; Avg. = Batting average; HR = Home runs; RBI = Runs batted in

Player	G	AB	H	Avg.	HR	RBI
George Shoch	70	264	63	.239	1	18
Pat Dealy	58	212	55	.259	1	18
Bill Krieg	25	95	24	.253	2	17
Barney Gilligan	28	90	18	.200	1	6
John Irwin	8	31	11	.355	2	3
Sam Crane	7	30	9	.300	0	1
Pete O'Brien	1	4	0	.000	0	0
Bill Wright	1	3	2	.667	0	0

=== Pitching ===
==== Starting pitchers ====
Note: G = Games pitched; IP = Innings pitched; W = Wins; L = Losses; ERA = Earned run average; SO = Strikeouts

Player	G	IP	W	L	ERA	SO
Jim Whitney	47	404.2	24	21	3.22	146
Hank O'Day	30	254.2	8	20	4.17	86
Frank Gilmore	28	234.2	7	20	3.87	114
Dupee Shaw	21	181.1	7	13	6.45	47
George Keefe	1	8.0	0	1	9.00	0
Ed Daily	1	7.0	0	1	7.71	3
