= 1887 Chicago White Stockings season =

1887 Chicago White Stockings
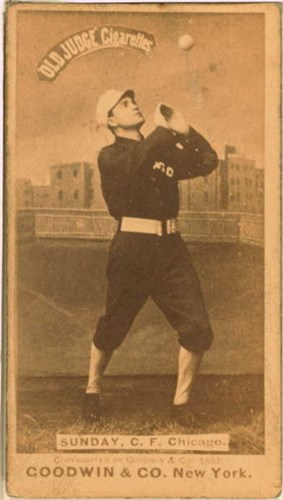
- League: National League
- Ballpark: West Side Park
- City: Chicago
- Record: 71–50 (.587)
- League place: 3rd
- Owner: Albert Spalding
- Manager: Cap Anson

The 1887 Chicago White Stockings season was the 16th season of the Chicago White Stockings franchise, the 12th in the National League and the third at the first West Side Park. The White Stockings finished third in the National League with a record of 71–50.

== Regular season ==
=== Season standings ===
National League
Team	W	L	Pct.	GB	Home	Road
Detroit Wolverines	79	45	.637	—	44‍–‍17	35‍–‍28
Philadelphia Quakers	75	48	.610	3½	38‍–‍23	37‍–‍25
Chicago White Stockings	71	50	.587	6½	44‍–‍18	27‍–‍32
New York Giants	68	55	.553	10½	36‍–‍26	32‍–‍29
Boston Beaneaters	61	60	.504	16½	38‍–‍22	23‍–‍38
Pittsburgh Alleghenys	55	69	.444	24	31‍–‍33	24‍–‍36
Washington Nationals	46	76	.377	32	26‍–‍33	20‍–‍43
Indianapolis Hoosiers	37	89	.294	43	24‍–‍39	13‍–‍50

=== Record vs. opponents ===
1887 National League record Sources:
Team	BSN	CHI	DET	IND	NYG	PHI	PIT	WAS
Boston	—	6–9–3	17–11–1	11–7	7–10–1	9–9	11–7	10–7–1
Chicago	9–6–3	—	10–8	13–5	11–6–1	12–6–1	5–12–1	11–7
Detroit	11–7–1	8–10	—	14–4–1	10–8	10–8	13–4	13–4–1
Indianapolis	7–11	5–13	4–14–1	—	3–15	1–17	7–11	10–8
New York	10–7–1	6–11–1	8–10	15–3	—	7–10–3	12–6	10–8–1
Philadelphia	9–9	6–12–1	8–10	17–1	10–7–3	—	12–6	13–3–1
Pittsburgh	7–11	12–5–1	4–13	11–7	6–12	6–12	—	9–9
Washington	7–10–1	7–11	4–13–1	8–10	8–10–1	3–13–1	9–9	—

== Roster ==
1887 Chicago White Stockings
Roster
Pitchers: Mark Baldwin; John Clarkson; Shadow Pyle; Charlie Sprague	Catchers: Tom Daly; Silver Flint; Infielders: Cap Anson; Tom Burns; Emil Geiss; Fred Pfeffer; Patsy Tebeau; Ned Williamson	Outfielders: Dell Darling; Jocko Flynn; Bob Pettit; Jimmy Ryan; Marty Sullivan; Billy Sunday; George Van Haltren	Manager: Cap Anson

== Player stats ==
=== Batting ===
==== Starters by position ====
Note: Pos = Position; G = Games played; AB = At bats; H = Hits; Avg. = Batting average; HR = Home runs; RBI = Runs batted in

Pos	Player	G	AB	H	Avg.	HR	RBI
C	Tom Daly	74	256	53	.207	2	17
1B	Cap Anson	122	472	164	.347	7	102
2B	Fred Pfeffer	123	479	133	.278	16	89
SS	Ned Williamson	127	439	117	.267	9	78
3B	Tom Burns	115	424	112	.264	3	60
OF	Marty Sullivan	115	472	134	.284	7	77
OF	Jimmy Ryan	126	508	145	.285	11	74
OF	Billy Sunday	50	199	58	.291	3	32

==== Other batters ====
Note: G = Games played; AB = At bats; H = Hits; Avg. = Batting average; HR = Home runs; RBI = Runs batted in

Player	G	AB	H	Avg.	HR	RBI
Silver Flint	49	187	50	.267	3	21
George Van Haltren	45	172	35	.203	3	17
Dell Darling	38	141	45	.319	3	20
Bob Pettit	34	138	36	.261	2	12
Patsy Tebeau	20	68	11	.162	1	10
Emil Geiss	3	12	1	.083	0	0
Jocko Flynn	1	0	0	----	0	0

=== Pitching ===
==== Starting pitchers ====
Note: G = Games pitched; IP = Innings pitched; W = Wins; L = Losses; ERA = Earned run average; SO = Strikeouts

Player	G	IP	W	L	ERA	SO
John Clarkson	60	523.0	38	21	3.08	237
Mark Baldwin	40	334.0	18	17	3.40	164
George Van Haltren	20	161.0	11	7	3.86	76
Shadow Pyle	4	26.1	1	3	4.72	5
Charlie Sprague	3	22.0	1	0	4.91	9
Emil Geiss	1	9.0	1	0	8.00	4

==== Other pitchers ====
Note: G = Games pitched; IP = Innings pitched; W = Wins; L = Losses; ERA = Earned run average; SO = Strikeouts

Player	G	IP	W	L	ERA	SO
Jimmy Ryan	8	45.0	2	1	4.20	14

==== Relief pitchers ====
Note: G = Games pitched; W = Wins; L = Losses; SV = Saves; ERA = Earned run average; SO = Strikeouts

Player	G	W	L	SV	ERA	SO
Marty Sullivan	1	0	0	0	7.71	1
Ned Williamson	1	0	0	0	9.00	0
Bob Pettit	1	0	0	0	0.00	0
