= 1887 Boston Beaneaters season =

1887 Boston Beaneaters
- League: National League
- Ballpark: South End Grounds
- City: Boston, Massachusetts
- Record: 61–60 (.504)
- League place: 5th
- Owner: Arthur Soden
- Managers: King Kelly, John Morrill

The 1887 Boston Beaneaters season was the 17th season of the franchise.

== Regular season ==
=== Season standings ===
National League
Team	W	L	Pct.	GB	Home	Road
Detroit Wolverines	79	45	.637	—	44‍–‍17	35‍–‍28
Philadelphia Quakers	75	48	.610	3½	38‍–‍23	37‍–‍25
Chicago White Stockings	71	50	.587	6½	44‍–‍18	27‍–‍32
New York Giants	68	55	.553	10½	36‍–‍26	32‍–‍29
Boston Beaneaters	61	60	.504	16½	38‍–‍22	23‍–‍38
Pittsburgh Alleghenys	55	69	.444	24	31‍–‍33	24‍–‍36
Washington Nationals	46	76	.377	32	26‍–‍33	20‍–‍43
Indianapolis Hoosiers	37	89	.294	43	24‍–‍39	13‍–‍50

=== Record vs. opponents ===
1887 National League record Sources:
Team	BSN	CHI	DET	IND	NYG	PHI	PIT	WAS
Boston	—	6–9–3	17–11–1	11–7	7–10–1	9–9	11–7	10–7–1
Chicago	9–6–3	—	10–8	13–5	11–6–1	12–6–1	5–12–1	11–7
Detroit	11–7–1	8–10	—	14–4–1	10–8	10–8	13–4	13–4–1
Indianapolis	7–11	5–13	4–14–1	—	3–15	1–17	7–11	10–8
New York	10–7–1	6–11–1	8–10	15–3	—	7–10–3	12–6	10–8–1
Philadelphia	9–9	6–12–1	8–10	17–1	10–7–3	—	12–6	13–3–1
Pittsburgh	7–11	12–5–1	4–13	11–7	6–12	6–12	—	9–9
Washington	7–10–1	7–11	4–13–1	8–10	8–10–1	3–13–1	9–9	—

=== Notable transactions ===
- April 1887: Tom Gunning was purchased from the Beaneaters by the Philadelphia Quakers.

=== Roster ===
1887 Boston Beaneaters
Roster
Pitchers: Dick Conway; Kid Madden; Old Hoss Radbourn; Bill Stemmyer	Catchers: Con Daily; Tom O'Rourke; Pop Tate; Infielders: Jack Burdock; John Morrill; Billy Nash; Ezra Sutton; Sam Wise	Outfielders: Joe Hornung; Dick Johnston; King Kelly; Bobby Wheelock	Manager: King Kelly; John Morrill

== Player stats ==
=== Batting ===
==== Starters by position ====
Note: Pos = Position; G = Games played; AB = At bats; H = Hits; Avg. = Batting average; HR = Home runs; RBI = Runs batted in

Pos	Player	G	AB	H	Avg.	HR	RBI
C	Pop Tate	60	231	60	.260	0	27
1B	John Morrill	127	504	141	.280	12	81
2B	Jack Burdock	65	237	61	.257	0	29
SS	Sam Wise	113	467	156	.334	9	92
3B	Billy Nash	121	475	140	.295	6	94
OF	King Kelly	116	484	156	.322	8	63
OF	Joe Hornung	98	437	118	.270	5	49
OF	Dick Johnston	127	507	131	.258	5	77

==== Other batters ====
Note: G = Games played; AB = At bats; H = Hits; Avg. = Batting average; HR = Home runs; RBI = Runs batted in

Player	G	AB	H	Avg.	HR	RBI
Ezra Sutton	77	326	99	.304	3	46
Bobby Wheelock	48	166	42	.253	2	15
Con Daily	36	120	19	.158	0	13
Tom O'Rourke	22	78	12	.154	0	10

=== Pitching ===
==== Starting pitchers ====
Note: G = Games pitched; IP = Innings pitched; W = Wins; L = Losses; ERA = Earned run average; SO = Strikeouts

Player	G	IP	W	L	ERA	SO
Old Hoss Radbourn	50	425.0	24	23	4.55	87
Kid Madden	37	321.0	21	14	3.79	81
Dick Conway	26	222.1	9	15	4.66	45
Bill Stemmyer	15	119.1	6	8	5.20	41

==== Relief pitchers ====
Note: G = Games pitched; W = Wins; L = Losses; SV = Saves; ERA = Earned run average; SO = Strikeouts

Player	G	W	L	SV	ERA	SO
King Kelly	3	1	0	0	3.46	0
