= 1887 Detroit Wolverines season =

1887 Detroit Wolverines
- National League champions World Series champions
- League: National League
- Ballpark: Recreation Park
- City: Detroit, Michigan
- Record: 79–45 (.637)
- League place: 1st
- Owner: Frederick K. Stearns
- Manager: William Watkins

The 1887 Detroit Wolverines season was a season in American baseball. The team won the 1887 National League pennant, then defeated the St. Louis Browns in the 1887 World Series. The season was the team's seventh since it entered the National League in 1881. It was the first World Series championship for the Detroit Wolverines and the City of Detroit.

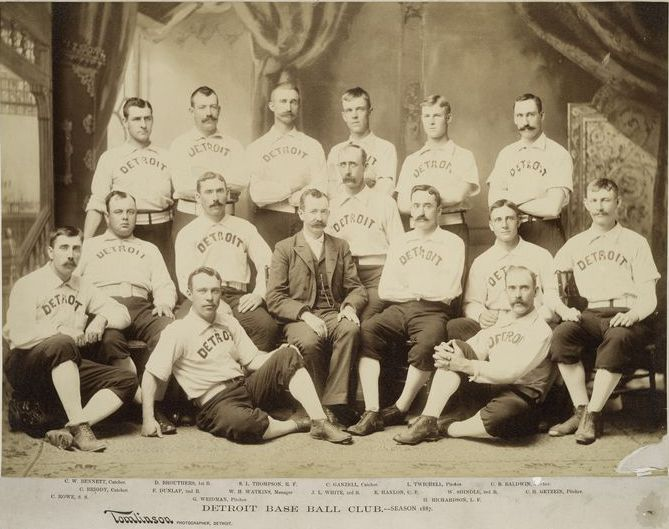
1887 Detroit Wolverines, World Series Champions

== Offseason ==
On March 13, after training in Macon, Georgia‚ the Wolverines began a six-week exhibition tour through the South and Midwest.

== The players ==
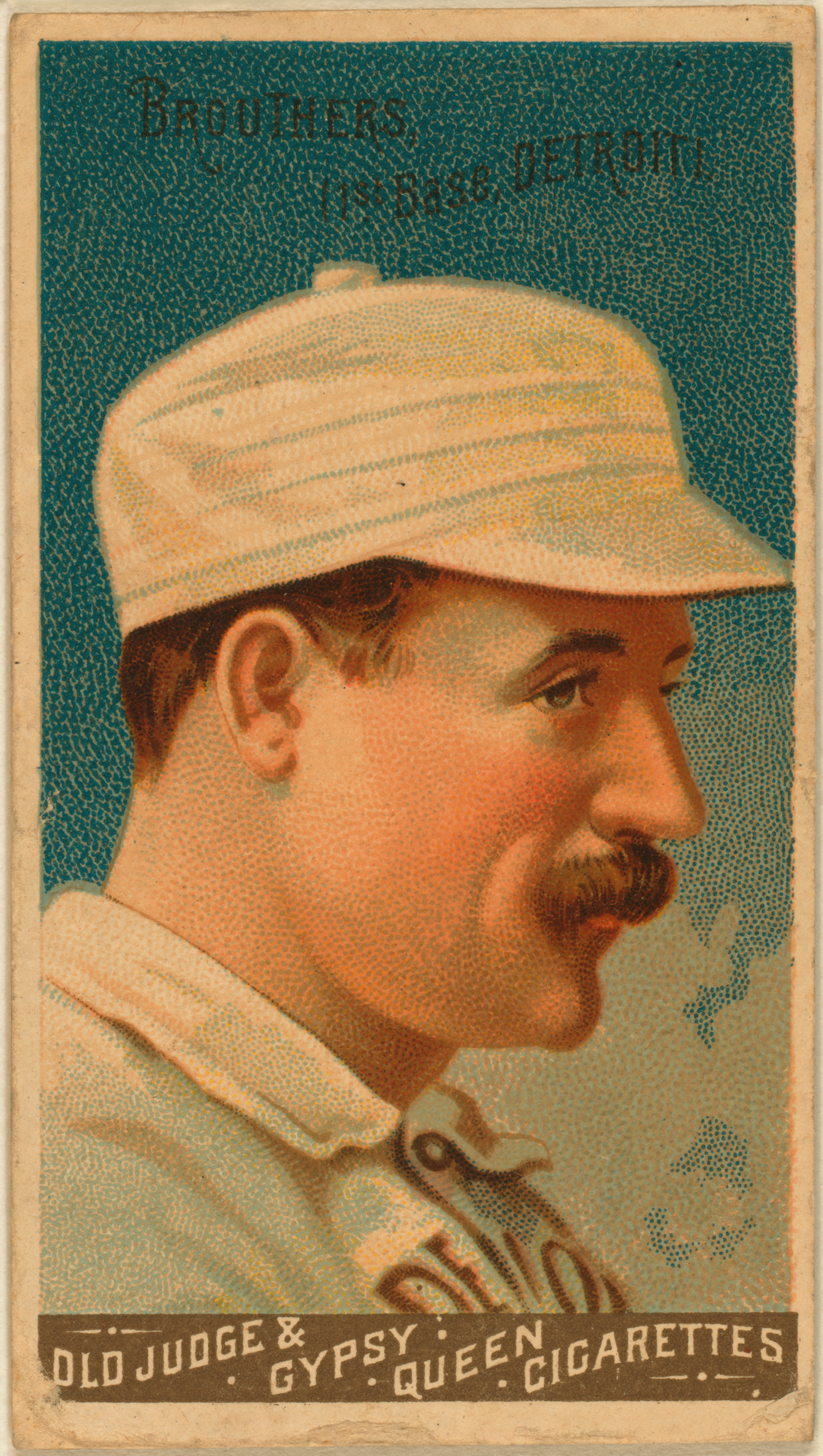
Dan Brouthers

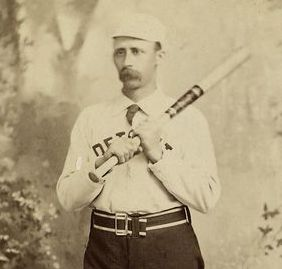
Deacon White

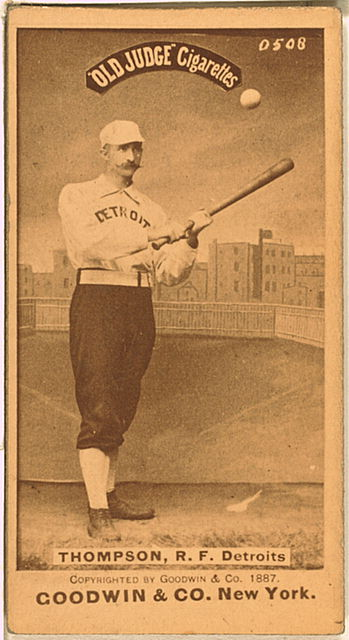
Sam Thompson

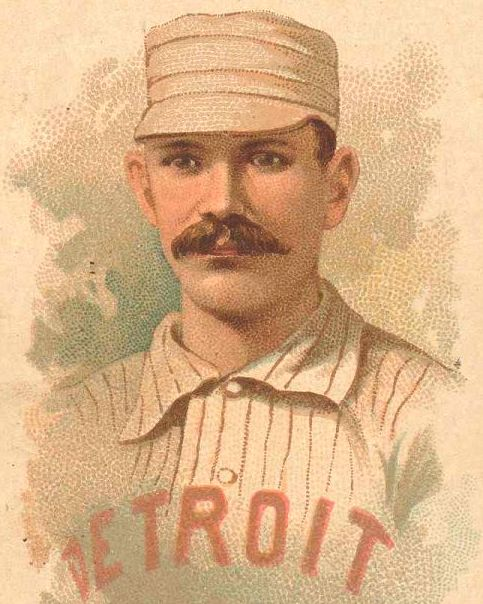
Charlie Getzien

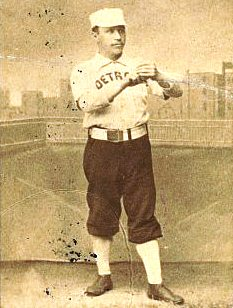
Stump Weidman

=== Catchers: Charlie Ganzel and Charlie Bennett ===
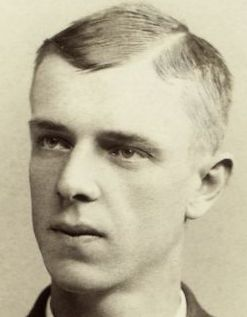
Charlie Ganzel

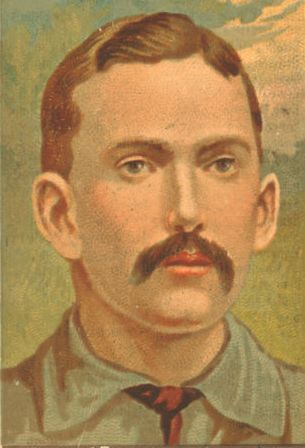
Fred Dunlap

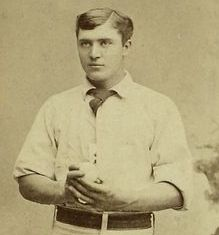
Jack Rowe

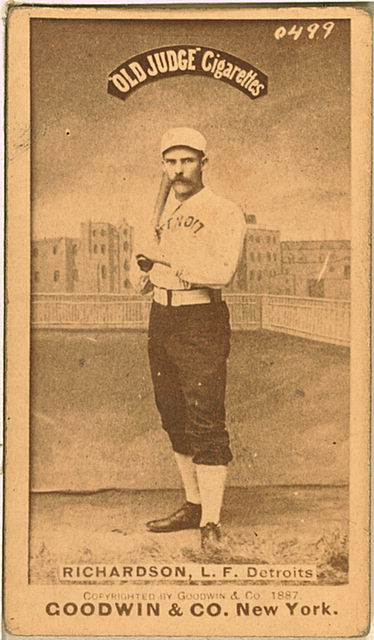
Hardy Richardson

Catching duties were divided between Charlie Ganzel (51 games at catcher) and Charlie Bennett (45 games at catcher). Both were good defensive catchers, though neither hit particularly well. Bennett had a better fielding percentage than Ganzel (.951 to .913), but Ganzel was stronger in range factor (6.78 to 5.64) and fielding runs (9 to 2). Bennett's career in baseball ended when he lost both his legs in a train accident. When the Detroit Tigers opened their new ballpark in 1896, they named it Bennett Park in his honor. It remained Bennett Park until 1912, when the newly built stadium on the same site was named Navin Field.

=== Infield: Brouthers, Dunlap, Rowe, Twitchell and White ===
First baseman Dan Brouthers was the first of four future Hall of Famers to play for the 1887 Wolverines. Brouthers won five batting titles and seven slugging titles, and his career batting average of .342 is the 9th highest in major league history. Brouthers was a key to the Wolverines offensive output in 1887 as he led the National League in runs (153), doubles (36), extra base hits (68), on-base percentage (.426), times on base (246), and OPS (.988). He was also among the league leaders with a .338 batting average (3rd in the NL), .562 slugging percentage (2nd in the NL), 20 triples, 12 home runs (5th in the NL), 101 RBIs (4th in the NL), 71 walks (4th in the NL), and an at-bat-to-strikeout ratio of 55.6 (2nd in NL).

The second baseman duties were split between Fred Dunlap and Hardy Richardson. Dunlap played 65 games at second base but missed two months due to an injury. As a result, Richardson played 64 games at second base in addition to 58 games as the left fielder. Richardson was a big contributor to the 1887 Wolverines, as he hit for a .327 average with 51 extra base hits, 131 runs scored, 178 hits and 94 RBIs. Richardson was also a good fielder both at second base and in left field.

Jack Rowe played 124 games at shortstop for the 1887 Wolverines. Rowe was part of "The Big Four" (along with Dan Brouthers, Deacon White, and Hardy Richardson) that Detroit owner Fred Stearns purchased from the Buffalo Bisons for $7,000 before the 1886 season. The purchase of four of the best players in baseball all at one time drew wide attention. Rowe had a big year for the Wolverines, with a .318 batting average, 135 runs scored (2nd in the NL), 171 hits (4th in the NL), 96 RBIs (6th in the NL), 30 extra base hits (7th in the NL), and 239 total bases (9th in the NL). Rowe hit for the cycle for the Wolverines on August 21, 1886. Rowe later suffered a nervous breakdown and died at age 54.

Third baseman Deacon White was also part of "The Big Four" acquired from Buffalo before the 1886 season, and is the second of four future Hall-of-Famers on the team. White won two batting crowns earlier in his career but was 39 years old in 1887. He still hit for a .303 batting average and had 11 triples, 75 RBIs and 20 stolen bases. White was a nonsmoking, Bible-toting, church-going deacon. According to Lee Allen in The National League Story (1961), White was one of the last people to believe that the earth is flat.

=== Outfield: Thompson, Hanlon, Richardson and Twitchell ===
Right fielder Sam Thompson, known as "Big Sam," was the third future Hall of Famer on the 1887 Detroit team. Thompson was in his prime in 1887 and had a tremendous year. He was the National League batting champion with a .372 average, and he also led the league in slugging percentage (.571), hits (203), total bases (311), triples (23), RBIs (166), and runs created (127). His 1887 total of 166 RBIs stood as a major league record for 40 years until Lou Gehrig broke it in 1927. He was No. 2 on the all-time home run list at the time of his retirement.

Center fielder Ned Hanlon was the fourth future Hall of Famer on the 1887 Detroit team. Though inducted into the Hall of Fame based on his later performance as a manager, Hanlon was a good fielding center fielder who had tremendous speed and range. In 1887, he stole 69 bases for the Wolverines. He also hit .291 with seven stolen bases and 4 RBIs in the 1887 World Series.

The left fielder duties were split between second baseman/outfielder Hardy Richardson, and pitcher/outfielder Larry Twitchell. In addition to pitching 15 games for the Wolverines, Twitchell played 44 games in left field and 9 games in center field. Twitchell had a .333 batting average and collected 51 RBIs in just 264 at bats. In his 15 games as a pitcher, Twitchell had a record of 11–1.

=== Pitching: Getzien, Baldwin, Weidman, Conway and Twitchell ===
The Wolverines' #1 pitcher in 1887 was Charlie Getzien. Getzien had a record of 29–13 for the 1887 team. Getzien started 42 games, pitched 41 complete games, and had an ERA of 3.73. He was among the league leaders in wins, win percentage (.690), inning pitched (366.2), and strikeouts (135). He was also first in the league with 24 home runs allowed. In the 1887 World Series, Getzien had a record of 4–2 with a 2.48 ERA.

Detroit's #2 starter was Charles B. "Lady" Baldwin. Baldwin played four seasons with the Wolverines. In 1886, Baldwin had a record of 42–13 (the most wins ever by a Detroit pitcher) with a 2.24 ERA in 487 innings pitched, striking out 323 of 1936 batters faced. Baldwin also completed 55 of 56 games, seven of which were shutouts. In 1887, Baldwin's appearances were reduced from 56 games to 24, and from 487 innings to 211. He won only 13 games in the regular season for the 1887 Wolverines, but in World Series play, Baldwin pitched 5 complete games for a 4–1 record and a 1.50 ERA.

The Wolverines' #3 pitcher was George Edward "Stump" Weidman. Weidman led the National League with a 1.80 ERA for Detroit in 1881. In 1887, Weidman returned to the Wolverines, where he went 13–7. By late July, Weidman fell out of favor with manager William Watkins who considered Weidman to be a malcontent. The Wolverines sold Weidman to the New York Metropolitans on August 5, 1887.

The Wolverines #4 pitcher was Pete Conway. Despite his 8–9 record in 1887, Conway had the lowest ERA (2.90) among the Detroit starters.

== Regular season ==
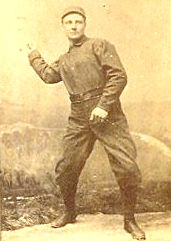
Billy Shindle

=== Season standings ===
National League
Team	W	L	Pct.	GB	Home	Road
Detroit Wolverines	79	45	.637	—	44‍–‍17	35‍–‍28
Philadelphia Quakers	75	48	.610	3½	38‍–‍23	37‍–‍25
Chicago White Stockings	71	50	.587	6½	44‍–‍18	27‍–‍32
New York Giants	68	55	.553	10½	36‍–‍26	32‍–‍29
Boston Beaneaters	61	60	.504	16½	38‍–‍22	23‍–‍38
Pittsburgh Alleghenys	55	69	.444	24	31‍–‍33	24‍–‍36
Washington Nationals	46	76	.377	32	26‍–‍33	20‍–‍43
Indianapolis Hoosiers	37	89	.294	43	24‍–‍39	13‍–‍50

=== Record vs. opponents ===
1887 National League record Sources:
Team	BSN	CHI	DET	IND	NYG	PHI	PIT	WAS
Boston	—	6–9–3	17–11–1	11–7	7–10–1	9–9	11–7	10–7–1
Chicago	9–6–3	—	10–8	13–5	11–6–1	12–6–1	5–12–1	11–7
Detroit	11–7–1	8–10	—	14–4–1	10–8	10–8	13–4	13–4–1
Indianapolis	7–11	5–13	4–14–1	—	3–15	1–17	7–11	10–8
New York	10–7–1	6–11–1	8–10	15–3	—	7–10–3	12–6	10–8–1
Philadelphia	9–9	6–12–1	8–10	17–1	10–7–3	—	12–6	13–3–1
Pittsburgh	7–11	12–5–1	4–13	11–7	6–12	6–12	—	9–9
Washington	7–10–1	7–11	4–13–1	8–10	8–10–1	3–13–1	9–9	—

=== Roster ===
1887 Detroit Wolverines
Roster
Pitchers: Lady Baldwin; Ed Beatin; William Burke; Pete Conway; Charlie Getzien; Henry Gruber; Stump Weidman	Catchers: Charlie Bennett; Fatty Briody; Charlie Ganzel; Infielders: Dan Brouthers; Fred Dunlap; Hardy Richardson; Jack Rowe; Billy Shindle; Deacon White	Outfielders: Ned Hanlon; Jim Manning; Sam Thompson; Larry Twitchell	Manager: Bill Watkins

=== Season summary ===
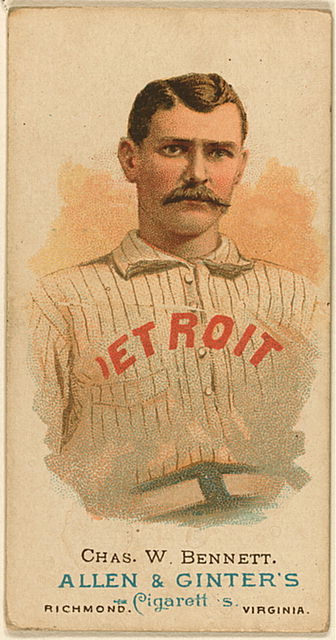
Charlie Bennett

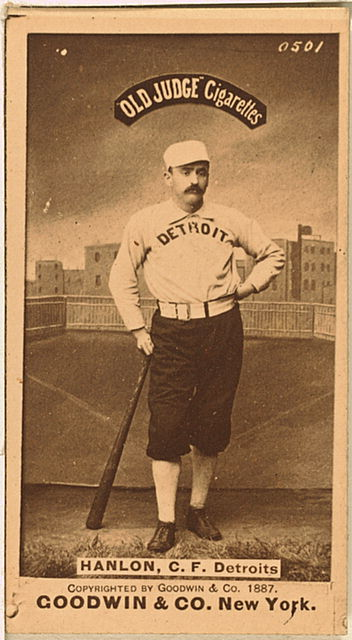
Ned Hanlon

The 1887 Wolverines finished the season with a record of 79–45. They outscored their opponents by more than 250 runs—969 to 714. They also led the National League in team batting average, runs scored and slugging. Wolverines batters dominated the National League leader board:

- Dan Brouthers, Jack Rowe, and Hardy Richardson were first, second and third in runs scored, with Sam Thompson fifth.
- Sam Thompson, Dan Brouthers and Hardy Richardson were first, second and third in total bases. The same three were Nos. 1, 3, and 6 in batting average.
- Sam Thompson and Dan Brouthers were first and second in slugging percentage and OPS.

=== Season highlights ===
- May 4: Detroit defeated Pittsburgh in 11 innings. Pittsburgh scored 4 runs in the first inning off Stump Weidman, but the Wolverines came back.
- May 7, 1887: Sam Thompson became the first major league player to hit two bases-loaded triples in one game as the Wolverines (8–1) beat the Indianapolis Hoosiers‚ 18–2.
- May 13, 1887: Fred Dunlap had his second six-hit game in a week (walks were counted as hits in 1887) to help Detroit beat Chicago‚ 17–7. Sam Thompson had three triples.
- May 17, 1887: Detroit's Dan Brouthers hit a bases-loaded triple and a bases-loaded home run as the Wolverines defeated the Quakers, 19–10.
- May 21, 1887: Sam Thompson hit a three-run home run to lead the Wolverines to a 4–2 victory over Washington.
- June 9, 1887: Detroit batters drew 13 walks from Hoosiers pitcher John Kirby.
- June 11, 1887: Detroit's Fred Dunlap established a National League record by starting four double plays at second base. He participated in five double plays in all to tie the existing major league mark and helps the Wolverines edge the Hoosiers‚ 7–6.
- July 1, 1887: The Quakers and Wolverines set an all-time record by scoring in 15 of the 18 half-innings played.
- July 5, 1887: Second baseman Fred Dunlap suffered a serious leg injury that kept him out of the lineup for two months. Detroit beat Boston‚ 16–8‚ to push the Beaneaters into third place.
- July 18, 1887: Paced by George Wood's two home runs‚ the Quakers beat the Wolverines 12–2‚ as Detroit suffered its first three-game sweep.
- July 21, 1887: Detroit manager William Watkins fined his third string battery of Fatty Briody and Stump Weidman. Dissension was rife throughout the team‚ but Watkins did not fine the more prominent malcontents.
- August 5, 1887: The Wolverines sold third string pitcher Stump Weidman to the New York Metropolitans.
- August 13, 1887: The White Stockings beat the Wolverines‚ 8–2‚ with John Clarkson pitching and hitting a home run. Detroit's lead narrowed to 1 1/2 games.
- August 15, 1887: John Clarkson of the Chicago White Stockings beat Detroit again‚ 6–4. The National League also threw out a protested game previously awarded to the Wolverines‚ leaving Chicago and Detroit tied for first place.
- August 16, 1887: Detroit beat John Clarkson and Chicago 5–3 with five runs in the fourth inning to regain sole possession of first place.
- September 1, 1887: After the Wolverines beat the Boston Beaneaters in three straight games, Boston removed King Kelly as captain and gave the job to John Morrill.
- September 5, 1887: Chicago won the opening game of their final series against league-leading Detroit 11–7. John Clarkson picked up his ninth victory over the Wolverines‚ the most ever by a pitcher over a pennant-winning team.
- September 7, 1887: Detroit defeated John Clarkson and the White Stockings‚ beating them twice‚ 8–2 and 8–4‚ with 34 hits in the two games. The defeat pushed second-place Chicago seven games behind.
- October 8, 1887: Detroit lost its last regular season game to Indianapolis, 11–9.

=== Player stats ===
==== Batting ====
===== Starters by position =====
Note: Pos = Position; G = Games played; AB = At bats; R = Runs; H = Hits; Avg. = Batting average; HR = Home runs; RBI = Runs batted in

Pos	Player	G	AB	R	H	Avg.	HR	RBI
C	Charlie Ganzel	57	227	40	59	.260	0	20
1B	Dan Brouthers	123	500	153	169	.338	12	101
2B	Fred Dunlap	65	272	60	72	.265	5	45
3B	Deacon White	111	449	71	136	.303	3	75
SS	Jack Rowe	124	537	135	171	.318	6	96
OF	Sam Thompson	127	545	118	203	.372	11	166
OF	Ned Hanlon	118	471	79	129	.274	4	69
OF	Hardy Richardson	120	543	131	178	.328	8	94

===== Other batters =====
Note: G = Games played; AB = At bats; R = Runs; H = Hits; Avg. = Batting average; HR = Home runs; RBI = Runs batted in

Player	G	AB	R	H	Avg.	HR	RBI
Larry Twitchell	65	264	44	88	.333	0	51
Charlie Bennett	46	160	26	39	.244	3	20
Fatty Briody	33	128	24	29	.227	1	26
Billy Shindle	26	84	17	24	.286	0	12
Jim Manning	13	52	5	10	.192	0	3

Note: pitchers' batting statistics not included

==== Pitching ====
===== Starting pitchers =====
Note: G = Games pitched; IP = Innings pitched; W = Wins; L = Losses; ERA = Earned run average; SO = Strikeouts

Player	G	IP	W	L	ERA	SO
Charlie Getzien	43	366.2	29	13	3.73	135
Lady Baldwin	24	211.0	13	10	3.84	60
Stump Weidman	21	183.0	13	7	5.36	56
Pete Conway	17	146.0	8	9	2.90	40
Larry Twitchell	15	112.1	11	1	4.33	24
Henry Gruber	7	62.1	4	3	2.74	12
Ed Beatin	2	18.0	1	1	4.00	6
William Burke	2	15.0	0	1	6.00	3

===== Relief pitchers =====
Note: G = Games pitched; W = Wins; L = Losses; SV = Saves; ERA = Earned run average; SO = Strikeouts

Player	G	W	L	SV	ERA	SO
Fred Dunlap	1	0	0	0	4.50	1

== 1887 World Series ==
=== World Series summary ===
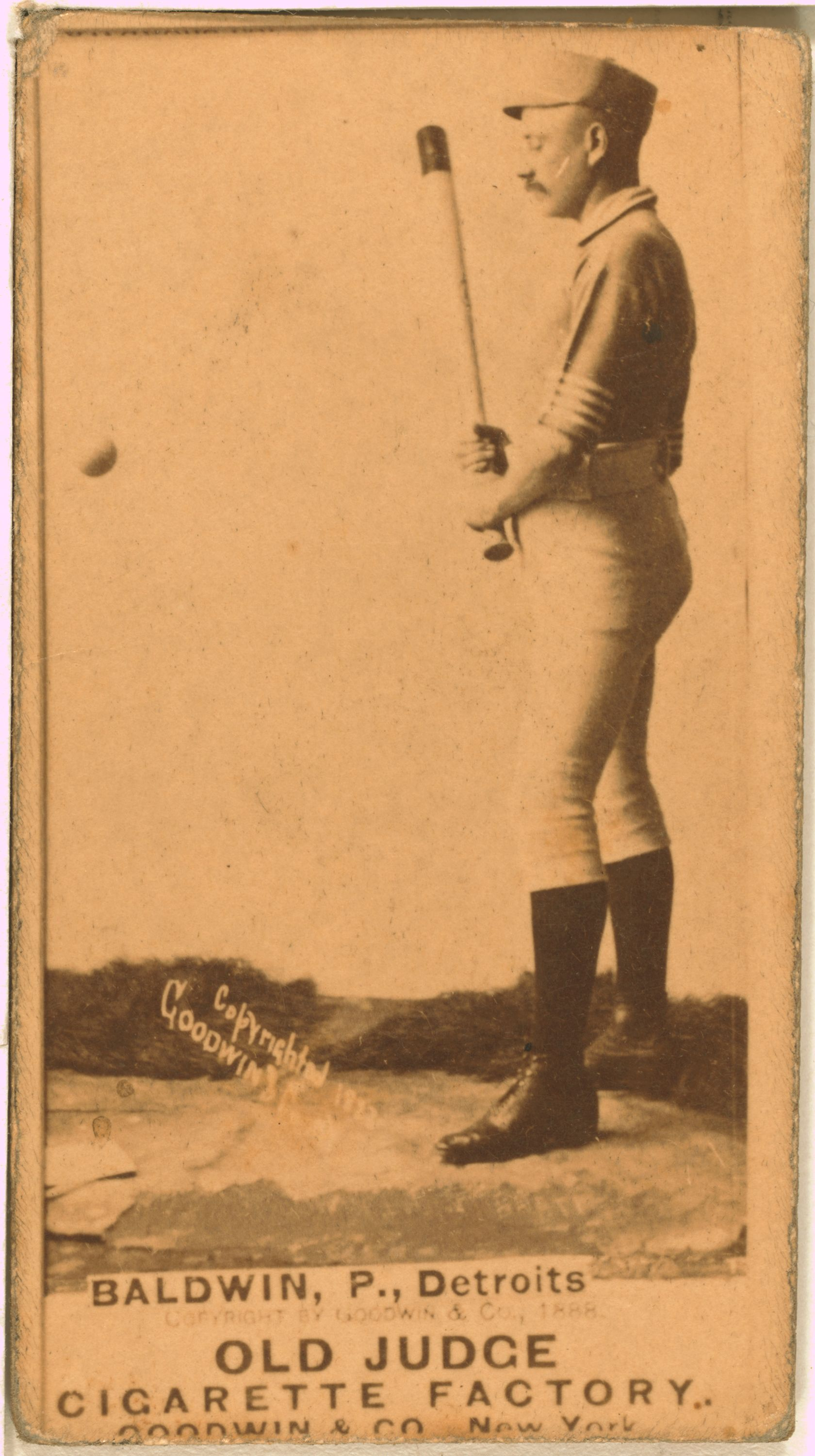
Lady Baldwin

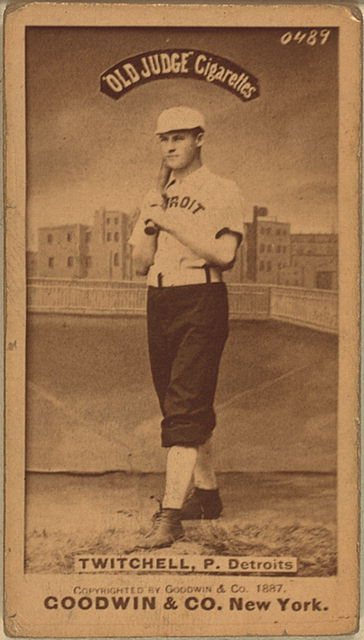
Larry Twitchell

The Detroit Wolverines defeated the St. Louis Browns in the 1887 World Series, 10 games to 5.

After the Wolverines won the National League pennant, owner Fred Stearns challenged the American Association champion St. Louis Browns. The Wolverines and the Browns would play "a series of contests for supremacy" of the baseball world. This early "world series" consisted of fifteen games – played in Pittsburgh, Brooklyn, New York, Philadelphia, Boston, Washington, Baltimore and Chicago, as well as Detroit and St. Louis. The Wolverines claimed their eighth victory – and thus the championship – in the eleventh game.

- October 9: The Browns ended their season with a 95–40 record‚ a win total that was not exceeded until the adoption of the 154-game schedule.
- October 10: The World Series opened in St. Louis with the Browns beating Detroit 6–1. St. Louis pitcher Bob Caruthers held the Wolverines to five hits and had three hits himself.
- October 11: In Game 2, the Wolverines scored five unearned runs to defeat the Browns, 5–3.
- October 12: In Game 3, Detroit won at home, 2–1, in 13 innings. St. Louis batters had 13 hits against Charlie Getzien‚ but scored only once. Bob Caruthers held the Wolverines to six hits, but the Wolverines scored twice.
- October 13: In Game 4, the World Series began its tour of other cities with a game in Pittsburgh. Detroit won, 8–0, behind the two-hit pitching of Lady Baldwin.
- October 15: In Game 5, the Browns beat the Wolverines in Brooklyn, 5–2.
- October 16: In Game 6, played in New York, Detroit beat St. Louis, 9–0. Charlie Getzien took a no-hitter (not counting walks) into the ninth inning but settled for a three-hit game. Charlie Ganzel‚ playing first base in place of the injured Dan Brouthers‚ led Detroit with four hits. Brouthers was out for the series with a sprained ankle.
- October 17: Detroit won Game 7, by a score of 3–1, in Phillies' Park.
- October 18: In Game 8, Detroit beat the Browns, 9–2, at old Dartmouth Street Grounds in Boston, as Big Sam Thompson hit two home runs.
- October 19: Detroit won Game 9 by a score of 4–2 at Athletics' Park and extended its lead in the World Series to seven games to two.
- October 21: After a rainout the day before, Detroit and St. Louis played two games in two cities on the same day. In the morning game in Washington, the Browns pull off a triple play in an 11–4 victory over Detroit. In Game 11, played in the afternoon at Baltimore, Detroit clinched the championship with its eighth victory, 13–3.
- October 26: The World Series ended with a final game back in St. Louis. St. Louis won the final game but lost the series‚ 10 games to 5. Sam Thompson led all hitters in the series with a .362 average.

=== Postseason player stats ===
==== Batting ====
Note: G = Games played; AB = At bats; H = Hits; Avg. = Batting average; HR = Home runs; RBI = Runs batted in

Player	G	AB	H	Avg.	HR	RBI
Charlie Bennett	5	17	4	.262	0	9
Dan Brouthers	1	3	2	.667	0	0
Fred Dunlap	11	40	6	.150	0	1
Charlie Ganzel	14	58	13	.224	0	2
Charlie Getzien	6	20	6	.300	0	2
Ned Hanlon	15	50	11	.220	0	4
Hardy Richardson	15	66	13	.197	1	4
Jack Rowe	15	63	21	.333	0	7
Sam Thompson	15	58	21	.362	2	7
Larry Twitchell	6	20	5	.250	1	3
Deacon White	15	58	12	.207	0	3

==== Pitching ====
Note: G = Games pitched; IP = Innings pitched; W = Wins; L = Losses; ERA = Earned run average; SO = Strikeouts

Player	G	IP	W	L	ERA	SO
Charlie Getzien	6	58.0	4	2	2.48	17
Lady Baldwin	5	42.0	4	1	1.50	4
Pete Conway	4	33.0	2	2	3.00	10

== Awards and honors ==
=== League leaders ===
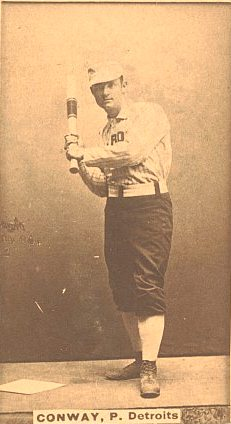
Pete Conway

- Dan Brouthers: National League on-base percentage leader (.426)
- Dan Brouthers: National League runs leader (153)
- Dan Brouthers: National League doubles leader (36)
- Dan Brouthers: National League extra base hits leader (68)
- Dan Brouthers: National League times on base leader (246)
- Charlie Getzien: National League leader in home runs allowed (24)
- Sam Thompson: National League batting champion (.372)
- Sam Thompson: National League slugging percentage leader (.571)
- Sam Thompson: National League hits leader (203)
- Sam Thompson: National League RBI leader (166)
- Sam Thompson: National League total bases leader (311)
- Sam Thompson: National League at bats leader (545)
- Sam Thompson: National League triples leader (23)
- Larry Twitchell: National League win percentage leader (.917)
- Deacon White: Oldest player in National League (39)

=== Players ranking among top 100 of all time at position ===
The following members of the 1887 Detroit Wolverines are among the Top 100 of all time at their positions, as ranked by The New Bill James Historical Baseball Abstract in 2001:

- Charlie Bennett: 49th best catcher of all time
- Dan Brouthers: 18th best first baseman of all time
- Fred Dunlap: 89th best second baseman of all time
- Hardy Richardson: 39th best second baseman of all time
- Deacon White: 76th best third baseman of all time
- Billy Shindle: 95th best third baseman of all time (played only 21 games at third base for the 1887 Wolverines)
- Sam Thompson: 37th best right fielder of all time
