= Dick Conway (baseball) =

American baseball player (1866–1926)

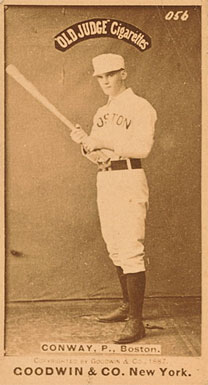
- Pitcher
- Born: April 25, 1866; Lowell, Massachusetts, U.S.
- Died: September 9, 1926 (aged 60); Lowell, Massachusetts, U.S.
- Batted: Left Threw: Right

MLB debut
- July 22, 1886, for the Baltimore Orioles

Last MLB appearance
- October 8, 1888, for the Boston Beaneaters

MLB statistics
- Record: 15-24
- Earned run average: 4.78
- Strikeouts: 121
- Stats at Baseball Reference

Teams
- Baltimore Orioles (1886); Boston Beaneaters (1887–1888)

Richard Butler Conway (April 25, 1866 – September 9, 1926) was an American pitcher and right fielder who played from 1886 through 1888 in Major League Baseball. Conway batted left-handed and threw right-handed. He was born in Lowell, Massachusetts.

In 1884, he played outfield for the Salem team in the Massachusetts State Association, and pitched for the Lawrence team of the New England League in 1885.

Conway was 21 years old when he entered the majors in 1886 with the Baltimore Orioles, playing for them one year before joining the Boston Beaneaters (1887–1888). While playing for Baltimore, Conway entered the baseball record books with his older brother and batterymate Bill Conway, the pair becoming one of 16 pitcher/catcher sibling combinations in major league history. His most productive season came in 1887, when he collected career-numbers in wins (9), starts (26), and innings pitched (222 1/3).

In a three-season career, Conway posted a 15–24 record with a 4.78 earned run average in 41 appearances, including 41 starts and 39 complete games, giving up 187 earned runs on 404 hits and 137 walks while striking out 121 in 352.0 innings of work. He also played 18 games as an outfielder, compiling a career .230 batting average (47-for-204) with 27 runs and 14 RBI.

While at Boston in 1888, he also played briefly for the Hyannis town team in what is now the Cape Cod Baseball League.

Following his majors career, Conway returned to the New England League and later pitched in the International League. He died in his homeland of Lowell at the age of 61.

== See also ==
- 1886 Baltimore Orioles season
- 1887 Boston Beaneaters season
- 1888 Boston Beaneaters season
