= Bill Watkins (baseball) =

Canadian baseball player (1858–1937)

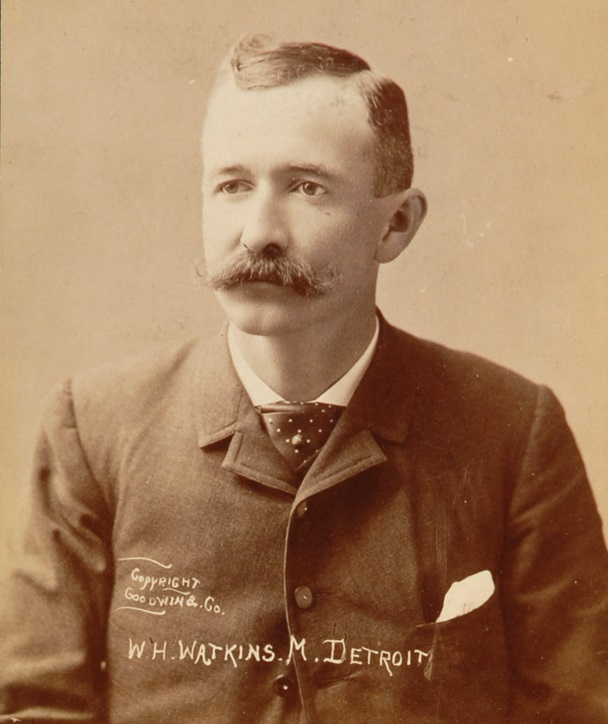
- Third baseman / Manager
- Born: May 5, 1858; Brantford, Canada West
- Died: June 9, 1937 (aged 79); Port Huron, Michigan, U.S.
- Batted: Right Threw: Unknown

MLB debut
- August 1, 1884, for the Indianapolis Hoosiers

Last MLB appearance
- October 13, 1884, for the Indianapolis Hoosiers

MLB statistics
- Batting average: .205
- Home runs: 0
- Runs scored: 16
- Managerial record: 452–444
- Stats at Baseball Reference

Teams
- As player: Indianapolis Hoosiers (1884); As manager: Indianapolis Hoosiers (1884); Detroit Wolverines (1885–88); Kansas City Cowboys (1888–89); St. Louis Browns (1893); Pittsburgh Pirates (1898–99)

Career highlights and awards
- World Series champion (1887); Federal League champion (1914)

William Henry Watkins (May 5, 1858 – June 9, 1937), sometimes known as "Wattie," or "Watty," was a Canadian-born professional baseball player, manager, executive, and team owner whose career in organized baseball spanned 47 years from 1876 to 1922.

He began playing organized baseball in Canada and Michigan and played one season of Major League Baseball as an infielder for the Indianapolis Hoosiers in 1884. He was a manager of five major league clubs and several minor league clubs, including stints with the Indianapolis Hoosiers (1884–85), Detroit Wolverines (1885–1888), Kansas City Cowboys (1888–89), St. Louis Browns (1893), and Pittsburgh Pirates (1898–99). He led the 1887 Detroit Wolverines to the first professional sports championship for Detroit with a National League pennant and a victory over the St. Louis Browns in the 1887 World Series. He was also the business manager of the 1914 Indianapolis Hoosiers team that won the Federal League pennant, the first and only major league baseball championship for Indianapolis.

== Early years ==
Watkins was born in Brantford, Canada West, in 1858. His parents, John Harton Watkins and Eliza Jane (Tyler) Watkins, were immigrants to Canada from Wales and Ireland, respectively. His mother died in 1868, and he was thereafter raised by his maternal grandparents in Erin, Ontario. Watkins attended Upper Canada College in Toronto for one year, and he began playing organized baseball in 1876 as part of "the academy team" in Milton, Ontario, a suburb of Toronto. He also held jobs as an apprentice for a manufacturer of novelty games and with a branch of the Ingles Corliss Engine Works. In 1879, at age 21, Watkins moved to Port Huron, Michigan, where he lived for the next 40 years.

== Professional baseball ==
=== Guelph and St. Thomas (1879–81) ===
From 1879 to 1880, Watkins played for the Maple Leafs of Guelph in Southwestern Ontario. The Maple Leafs won the Canadian amateur championship while Watkins was a player. In 1881 and/or 1882, he was a player-manager for the Atlantic Club of St. Thomas, Ontario (part of the London, Ontario metropolitan area). He led the Athletics to the Ontario provincial baseball championship in 1881.

=== Port Huron and Bay City (1882-84) ===
Watkins joined the Port Huron, Michigan baseball club late in the 1882 season. In 1883, he served as player-manager for the Port Huron club, playing at third base and leading the club to a Michigan State League championship.

In September 1883, Watkins was hired to take over as manager of the Bay City, Michigan club for the 1884 season at a salary of $2,000. He led Bay City to a tie for first place in the Northwest League when the team disbanded in July 1884.

=== Indianapolis, Part I (1884) ===
On August 1, 1884, Watkins made his major league debut with the Indianapolis Hoosiers of the American Association. Watkins appeared in 34 games, 23 at third base, nine at second base and two at shortstop. Watkins also took over as the Hoosiers' manager, compiling a 4–18 record.

On August 26, 1884, Watkins was hit on the head by a pitch from Gus Shallix, at Cincinnati. The Cincinnati Enquirer described the incident as follows:

With two out, Watkins came to bat and fell a victim to one of the swift curves of Shallix. The poor fellow ducked his head, but it was too late, and the ball caught him on the temple. He rolled over into the diamond, while a thrill of horror passed through the hearts of those in the stands. He was half carried, writhing nervously with pain, to the directors' room, where it was found that though the shock to his system had been great, no bones were broken.

Newspaper accounts indicate that he "hovered between life and death" for five days. It took two weeks for him to recover, and during that time, he lost 16 pounds. Watkins returned briefly as a player after the injury, but his performance was substantially diminished. On September 14, 1884, Watkins' error at second base let in most of Baltimore's runs in a 4–4 tie game. He appeared in his final game as a player on October 13, 1884.

Newspaper stories published in 1912 in the Indianapolis Star and in 1937 in The Sporting News claimed that Watkins' hair turned prematurely white in 1884 due to the injury sustained when he was struck on the head. In his biography for the SABR Baseball Biography Project, Bill Lamb wrote that the story about Watkins' hair turning white appears to be "folklore", as "post-beaning photographs" (including the image displayed above) "show Watkins with reddish-brown hair and mustache until he was well into middle age."

=== Indianapolis, Part II (1885) ===
In 1885, the Indianapolis club in the American Association disbanded. Along with Ted Sullivan, Tom Loftus, and George Tebeau, Watkins helped organize the original Western League, a minor league baseball circuit based in the Midwestern United States. A new version of the Indianapolis Hoosiers was established in the Western League with Watkins as the manager. In April 1885, The Sporting Life praised Watkins' effort in maintaining "rigid discipline", putting an end to the "carousals" of the prior year, and ridding the club of "the whiskey element" and noted that Watkins had become "the most popular and efficient manager the club has ever had."

By mid-June, the Hoosiers were the dominant team in the Western League, compiling an .880 winning percentage. However, the league disbanded in mid-June, and a rush developed to sign the players on the Indianapolis roster, a line-up that included Sam Thompson, Deacon McGuire, Sam Crane, Jim Donnelly, Chub Collins, Mox McQuery, Gene Moriarty, and Dan Casey.

Sam Thompson later told the colorful story of the Hoosiers' acquisition by Detroit. Detroit sent two representatives (Marsh and Maloney) to Indianapolis, principally to sign the Hoosiers' battery of Larry McKeon and Jim Keenan. The Wolverines were outbid by the Cincinnati Reds for McKeon and Keenan but wound up with Watkins and the rest of the team's starting lineup. The only catch was that a 10-day waiting period would allow other teams to outbid Detroit. Marsh and Maloney promptly sent the players to Detroit and quartered them in a hotel there. The next morning, the players were told that the team had arranged a fishing trip for them. The players boarded the steamship Annette and enjoyed the first day and night of successful fishing. After three days, the players became suspicious, but the ship captain laughed when asked when they would return to Detroit. As the players became mutinous on the sixth day, the captain admitted he had been ordered to keep them "out at sea" for 10 days. In another account, Thompson described his 10 days aboard the Annette as follows:

We were prisoners, but well cared-for prisoners. Anything in the line of creature comforts you could find packed away on ice. We lived on the best in the market, and spent the rest of the time in fishing and playing poker, chips having very thoughtfully been provided. On the night of the tenth day, at midnight, we were all taken ashore where Watkins met us and signed us to our contracts.

The players were only later presented with their accumulated mail which included scores of offers from other clubs. A writer in the Detroit Free Press noted: "Detroit magnates showed some inside baseball brains and great finessing in sending the players away from all tempters for that period when they belonged to no club."

=== Detroit (1885-88) ===
When Watkins took over as manager of the Detroit Wolverines in June 1885, the team had compiled a 7–31 record to that point in the season. With the infusion of talent from Indianapolis, the team improved to 34–36 for the remainder of the 1885 season.

Late in the 1885 season, Detroit acquired four players from the Buffalo baseball club (Jack Rowe, Dan Brouthers, Hardy Richardson, and Deacon White) who were known as the "Big Four." The "Big Four" were "regarded for many years as the greatest quartette in the history of the national pastime." The "Big Four" joined Detroit for the 1886 season. With the addition of the "Big Four", the Wolverines improved substantially, finishing in second place with an 85–38 record in 1886.

The 1887 season was the pinnacle in the history of the Detroit Wolverines. The team was loaded with hitters, including six regulars who hit above .300: Sam Thompson (.372 and 166 RBIs in 127 games), Dan Brouthers (.338 and 101 RBIs in 123 games), Larry Twitchell (.333), Hardy Richardson (.328), Jack Rowe (.318) and Deacon White (.303). The pitching staff was led by "Pretzels" Getzien, a curveball specialist who compiled a 29–13 (.690) win–loss records and a 3.73 earned run average. Outfielder Larry Twitchell also started 12 games as pitcher and compiled an 11–1 record. The Wolverines won the National League pennant with a 79–45 record and then defeated the St. Louis Browns in the 1887 World Series.

During the 1888 season, the Wolverines fell to fifth place. In late August 1888, the Detroit club fired, or accepted the resignation of, Watkins as their manager, and Robert Leadley was hired as "acting manager" in his place. The Wolverines compiled a 49–44 record in their final year under Watkins.

=== Kansas City (1888–89) ===
After parting ways with the Wolverines in late August 1888, Watkins was hired in early September 1888 as the manager of the Kansas City Cowboys of the American Association. He led the club to an 8–17 record in the final month of the 1888 season and a 55–82 record in 1889.

=== St. Paul (1890–91) ===
In June 1890, Watkins was hired as the mid-season replacement manager for the St. Paul Apostles of the Western Association. Watkins had little success in turning the St. Paul club around, and in August 1890, The Sporting Life reported that Watkins had been forced to release players and cut salaries to reduce expenses, and that he was "running the St. Paul team economically according to instructions", though he hoped to have a stronger team in 1891. The Apostles finished in last place in 1890 with a 37–84 record.

In September 1890, with the St. Paul club losing money, C. L. Flatley, a personal friend of Watkins, purchased the club and promptly signed Watkins to serve as the club's manager again in 1891. However, Flatley had sold the club by December 1890. In June 1891, with the Apostles continuing to struggle financially and on the field, the club was sold and moved to Duluth, Minnesota. Two months later, in August 1891, the club disbanded, and Watkins was left with financial responsibility for half of the Duluth team's unpaid player salaries.

=== Rochester (1892) ===
In April 1892, Watkins was hired as the manager of the Rochester Flour Cities in the Eastern League and was described by The Sporting Life as "a cuckoo" who "will not be handicapped by meddling directors." By the end of the season, the Rochester correspondent for The Sporting Life commended Watkins for his efforts with a "misfit team" that had a "scarcity of good men", was "badly crippled", suffered "internal dissension", and drew small crowds. The correspondent noted that Watkins had turned the club around with his emphasis on discipline:

He has been as watchful of his men in the dark hours of the night as any man with self-respect could be, he has been always safe in his financial policy, his judgment of players has never gone wrong, he has been a stickler for finished team work ... He has been a dignified gentleman throughout and, considering the circumstances, the highest success as a manager... Local cranks will wish him unlimited success in every undertaking, and bear on with the hope that he may again pilot base ball in Rochester in 1893.

=== St. Louis (1893) ===
In 1893, Watkins was hired as the manager of the St. Louis Browns (later renamed the Cardinals) of the National League. Under owner Chris von der Ahe, the Browns had gone through five managers during the 1892 season, finishing in 11th place with a 56–94 (.373) record. Watkins remained the manager for the entire 1893 season and led the club to a 57-75 (.432) record and a 10th-place finish in 1893.

=== Sioux City (1894) ===
In 1894, Watkins was the manager of the Sioux City Cornhuskers in the newly formed Western League. He led the Sioux City club to the first Western League pennant with a 74–52 record. Four of his regular players (Lew Camp, Frank Genins, Lefty Marr and George Hogriever) hit .350 or higher, and pitcher Bert Cunningham won 35 games, but the Sporting Life gave much of the credit for the Huskers' championship to Watkins:

Watkins' success as a manager is largely due to the discipline which he enforces and to his knowledge of the intricate points of the game. With him the national game has become as easy as the moves to an expert chess player. With the diamond in front of him every correct move of the men on the field is quickly discerned, and with the signals used so advantageously he is always in communication with the captain and players. Many of the Husker victories this season have been won by the silent man on the bench ...

By 1894, Watkins had won pennants as a manager in St. Thomas, Port Huron, Detroit and Sioux City, and had led teams in Indianapolis and Bay City to first place in seasons that ended prematurely; the Sporting Life at the time asserted that Watkins had "the distinction of piloting more pennant winners than any other manager before the public to-day."

=== Indianapolis, Part III (1895–98) ===
From 1895 through the early part of the 1898 season, Watkins was the manager of the Indianapolis Hoosiers/Indians in the Western League.

=== Pittsburgh (1898–99) ===
In 1898, Watkins was hired as the manager of the Pittsburgh Pirates. Wasting the efforts of pitcher Jesse Tannehill (25–13 record and 2.95 ERA), the 1898 Pirates compiled a .258 team batting average (13 points below the league average) and finished in eighth place out of twelve teams with a 72–76 record. As he had been with other clubs, Watkins remained a strict disciplinarian as manager of the Pirates. The Sporting Life wrote:

Watty is a firm base ball man, knows the practical side of the sport, and in the writer's recollection one of the few chiefs in the Pittsburg Club's employ who had courage to rebuke with spirit and determination players violating edicts, etc. Discipline prevails in his club. His iron-bound policy of directing plays of course cannot be popular with players, but if dictation is absent and appeal impossible the method may be pushed to success.

Watkins also gained note while in Pittsburgh for his giving mandatory signs to each batter from the bench. One newspaper suggested that Watkins was turning his players into machines:

The chief objection to the Watkins system is that it compels players to lose all individuality and become a mere portion of the machine that Watkins makes of his team. According to Walter Brodie, late of Pittsburg, and now of the Orioles, Watkins is the most autocratic of autocrats. He establishes rules that must be lived up to the letter, and no man on the team must have a mind of his own. ... Watkins success, then, lies in making machines of his men and thinking for them.

Watkins described his sign system as follows: "I have only four, one telling the player to sacrifice, the second for the hit and run game, the third to hit the ball out, and the fourth to bunt. This completes the list, and they are as simple as can be. But when I give a player instructions what to do he will obey or get out of the club."

Watkins returned as the Pirates' manager in 1899 at an annual salary of $4,500, but he resigned in May 1899 after the team began the season with a 7–15 record. Watkins said at the time that he had other business to attend to, that he intended to quit baseball for good, and that he planned to return to his farm in Wadhams, Michigan: "I am going back to the farm to see the horses and dogs. I have wanted to give up base ball for some time past. A turbulent life? I should say so. I will go into a quieter business."

=== Indianapolis, Parts IV (1900–01) ===
In November 1899, Watkins purchased the Indianapolis Hoosiers of the American League from John T. Brush for "something like $10,000." Watkins also leased land on the east side of Indianapolis and announced plans to build a new baseball field there. Speculation was immediate that Watkins was not a bona fide purchaser of the club and that he had "purchased" the club as a front man for Brush, who had been roundly criticized for his manipulations of the lineups of the two clubs (the Cincinnati Reds and Indianapolis Hoosiers) that he owned. Watkins also served as manager of the 1900 Indianapolis team, compiling a 71–64 record and finishing in third place. After American League president Ban Johnson converted the circuit into a major league, eliminating Indianapolis' spot in the league, Watkins was a leader of efforts in early 1901 to re-establish the American Association in competition with the American League. In January 1901, he was named chairman of the new league. The efforts to establish a new American Association were unsuccessful, and Watkins' Indianapolis club joined the Western Association for the 1901 season. He sold the club in July 1901, and it was moved to Matthews, Indiana.

=== Indianapolis, Part V (190–03) ===
In late 1901, Watkins led renewed, and this time successful, efforts to re-establish a 20th-century version of the American Association with teams in Indianapolis, Louisville, Milwaukee, Kansas City, Columbus, Toledo and Minneapolis. In the early days of the new league, Watkins was credited with keeping the league from doing business with players who had jumped contracts with other teams and was called "the prime mover in the events which finally resulted in peace between the American Association and the minor leagues." He became a one-half owner of the Indianapolis Indians in the American Association, and he also served as manager during the 1902 and 1903 seasons. Official records cite John Grim as manager of the 1902 team, but Watkins' biographer Bill Lamb wrote that Watkins fully exercised duties now associated with a team manager. Moreover, contemporaneous newspaper accounts in 1902 referred to Watkins as the team's manager. The 1902 Indians compiled a 96–45 record and won the first American Association pennant. After the pennant was secured, The Indianapolis Journal described Watkins' reaction:

It is useless to mention him as Mr. W. H. Watkins. There are others of that name, while there is only one Watty. The exuberance of his eye, the thrill of enthusiasm in his voice and the general air of conquest surrounds him, told eloquently that Watty was happy. He leaned back in his mahogany chair in the pennant office in the Majestic building and illuminated every part of the room with his sunny countenance. He was in a benign mood, loquacious and enthusiastic.

Watkins' 1903 team drew only 88,000 spectators, the lowest attendance in the American Association.

=== Minneapolis (1904–05) ===
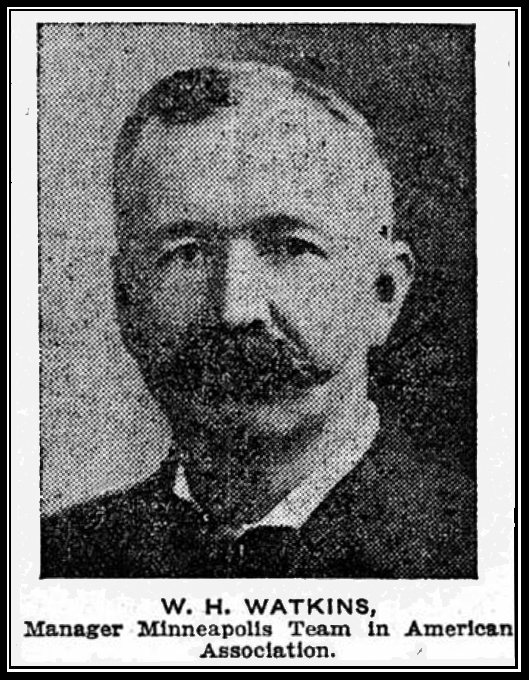
Watkins as manager of the Millers

In November 1903, Watkins purchased the Minneapolis Millers of the American Association for $10,000. Watkins also served as the manager of the Minneapolis club during the 1904 and 1905 seasons. While managing the Millers, Watkins developed a reputation as a fierce competitor. The Minneapolis Journal in 1906 wrote:

He has been in the business so long he has probably handled more players than any other man in baseball today. Some men in managing a team from the bench can do so in a calm manner, but 'Watty' was not one of these. He was 'in' the game just as much as any player ... It hurt him to lose games more than it did to lose money. Taking baseball so seriously threatened injury of a lasting nature to his nervous organization ...

In October 1905, Watkins authored a lengthy article for The Minneapolis Journal outlining his views on the value of baseball as a game wherein "brains must be combined with skill", a game that "demands temperance and proper living", and "as an element of great good in American life."

In December 1905, Watkins sold his ownership interest in the Minneapolis baseball club to Mike Kelley. The sale price was not disclosed but was "said to be in the neighborhood of $50,000."

=== Indianapolis, Part VI (1906–12) ===
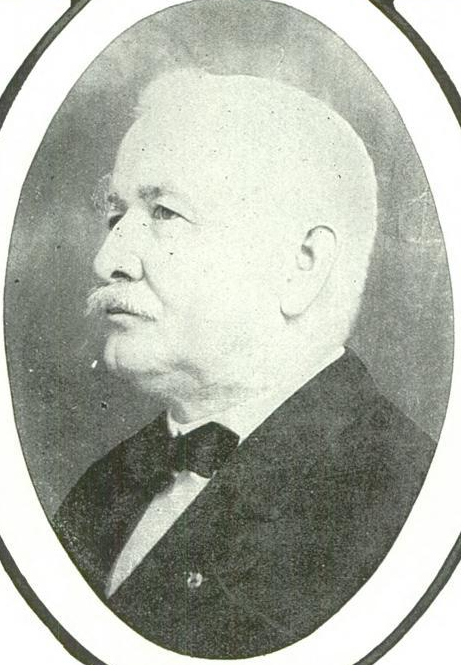
Watkins, c. 1911

Watkins returned to Indianapolis in 1906 as manager of the Indianapolis Indians of the American Association. The Indianapolis Morning Star reported that local baseball fans were "rejoicing", and that Watkins was "regarded as the most competent manager in the American Association." He had retained his half ownership interest in the Indianapolis club even while he was managing the Minneapolis team. He was also president of the club from 1906 to 1912. He stepped down as bench manager in May 1906, turning over responsibility of bench manager to Charlie Carr.

As of January 1912, Watkins owned interests in baseball clubs in three different leagues: the Indianapolis Indians in the American Association, the Springfield, Ohio club in the Central League, and the Newark, Ohio club in the Ohio State League. The Springfield and Newark clubs were both farm teams for the Indianapolis club. In February 1912, the Sporting Life reported that Watkins actually had a say in four minor league clubs and referred to him as the "monarch of the minors."

In the spring of 1912, the Sporting Life published a report that Watkins had sold his interest in the Indianapolis club, and the Indianapolis Star reported that Watkins had been "deposed" as president of the Indianapolis team, tendering his resignation after refusing the demand from club owners to remove the manager, Jimmy Burke. The Star noted at the time:

For more than thirty years he has been a prominent figure in baseball. He was one of the organizers of the American Association ... Mr. Watkins is a baseball man of the old school and he has been in the thick of all the grueling battles through which organized baseball has passed to bring it up to its present standard as one of the greatest amusement enterprises in the country. He has been through five baseball wars, and, as he says, 'went broke' in every one of them.

While Watkins was generally regarded as a good judge of talent, he and manager Charlie Carr were criticized in hindsight for having sold Grover Cleveland Alexander (later inducted into the Baseball Hall of Fame), Marty O'Toole and Buck O'Brien for a mere $750 while they were president and manager of the Indianapolis club.

=== Indianapolis, Part VII: Federal League (1914) ===
In February 1914, Watkins was hired, at a salary reported to be $8,000, as the business manager for the Indianapolis Hoosiers team in the newly formed Federal League. Upon his hiring, The Sporting Life opined: "William H. Watkins has served the game as player, manager, and magnate for three decades, with credit to himself and the sport, and his re-entrance in the Indianapolis field, where he labored for the greater part of his brilliant career, is absolutely certain to redound to the advantage of his new club and league." Watkins told the press: "I know that Indianapolis, with its large suburban population, is large enough and has enough enthusiastic fans to support two base ball teams so long as there is no serious confliction in dates. I am glad to get back into the harness and particularly glad to return to Indianapolis."

The 1914 Hoosiers compiled an 88–65 record and won the first Federal League pennant, the first and only major league pennant in Indianapolis baseball history. However, in late March 1915, a deal was struck that resulted in the Indianapolis club being moved to Newark, New Jersey. Watkins did not follow the team to Newark.

In all, Watkins was affiliated with Indianapolis baseball clubs in seven different leagues: the 1884 Hoosiers in the American Association, the 1885 Hoosiers in the first version of the Western League, the 1895–98 Hoosiers/Indians in the second version of the Western League, the 1900 Hoosiers in the American League, the 1901 Hoosiers in the Central League, the 1903 and 1906–1910 Indians in the 20th century version of the American Association and the 1914 Hoosiers in the Federal League.

=== Port Huron, Part II (1920–22) ===
From 1920 to 1922, Watkins served as president of the Port Huron baseball club. In 1921, Watkins was one of the principal backers of the Port Huron club when it joined the Michigan–Ontario League. Watkins resigned the club's presidency in May 1922 in a letter stating that his business commitments prevented him from devoting the time needed for proper management of the club.

== Managerial record ==
Team	Year	Regular season					Postseason			
Team	Year	Games	Won	Lost	Win %	Finish	Won	Lost	Win %	Result
IND	1884	23	4	18	.182	11th in NA	–	–	–	–
DET	1885	70	34	36	.486	6th in NL	–	–	–	–
DET	1886	126	87	36	.182	2nd in NL	–	–	–	–
DET	1887	127	79	45	.637	1st in NL	10	5	.667	Won World Series (STL)
DET	1888	94	49	44	.527	5th in NL	–	–	–	–
KC	1888	25	8	17	.320	8th in AA	–	–	–	–
KC	1889	139	55	82	.401	7th in AA	–	–	–	–
STL	1893	135	57	75	.432	10th in NL	–	–	–	–
PIT	1898	151	72	76	.486	8th in NA	–	–	–	–
PIT	1899	24	7	15	.318	7th in NA	–	–	–	–
Total		914 (Note: Watkins also managed in 18 games that ended in a tie)	452	444	.504		10	5	.667	

== Family and later years ==
Watkins was married in 1884 to Edna Buzzard. They apparently had no children. Watkins became a naturalized United States citizen in 1897.

After retiring from baseball, Watkins lived in Port Huron, Michigan and worked as an executive at banks and land development and manufacturing companies. He also served as president of the Port Huron Chamber of Commerce and helped found the city of Marysville, Michigan, serving as the first village president and chairing the committee that incorporated Marysville into a city. He was elected justice of the peace in Marysville in 1933.

Watkins died from diabetes in 1937 at age 79 in Port Huron. He was survived by his wife, Edna, and was buried at Lakeside Cemetery in Port Huron. The field used by both the Port Huron semipro and high school baseball teams was named Watkins Field in his honor, though it ceased being used in the early 1940s. Watkins was inducted into the Port Huron Sports Hall of Fame in 2008.
