= 1887 Pittsburgh Alleghenys season =

1887 Pittsburgh Alleghenys
- League: National League
- Ballpark: Recreation Park
- City: Allegheny, Pennsylvania
- Record: 55–69 (.444)
- League place: 6th
- Owner: William A. Nimick
- Manager: Horace B. Phillips

The 1887 Pittsburgh Alleghenys season was the sixth season of the Pittsburgh Alleghenys franchise and its first in the National League, where they remain to this day. The Alleghenys finished sixth in the standings with a record of 55–69.

== Regular season ==
=== Season standings ===
National League
| Team | W | L | Pct. | GB | Home | Road |
|---|---|---|---|---|---|---|
| Detroit Wolverines | 79 | 45 | .637 | — | 44‍–‍17 | 35‍–‍28 |
| Philadelphia Quakers | 75 | 48 | .610 | 3½ | 38‍–‍23 | 37‍–‍25 |
| Chicago White Stockings | 71 | 50 | .587 | 6½ | 44‍–‍18 | 27‍–‍32 |
| New York Giants | 68 | 55 | .553 | 10½ | 36‍–‍26 | 32‍–‍29 |
| Boston Beaneaters | 61 | 60 | .504 | 16½ | 38‍–‍22 | 23‍–‍38 |
| Pittsburgh Alleghenys | 55 | 69 | .444 | 24 | 31‍–‍33 | 24‍–‍36 |
| Washington Nationals | 46 | 76 | .377 | 32 | 26‍–‍33 | 20‍–‍43 |
| Indianapolis Hoosiers | 37 | 89 | .294 | 43 | 24‍–‍39 | 13‍–‍50 |

=== Record vs. opponents ===
1887 National League record Sources:
| Team | BSN | CHI | DET | IND | NYG | PHI | PIT | WAS |
|---|---|---|---|---|---|---|---|---|
| Boston | — | 6–9–3 | 17–11–1 | 11–7 | 7–10–1 | 9–9 | 11–7 | 10–7–1 |
| Chicago | 9–6–3 | — | 10–8 | 13–5 | 11–6–1 | 12–6–1 | 5–12–1 | 11–7 |
| Detroit | 11–7–1 | 8–10 | — | 14–4–1 | 10–8 | 10–8 | 13–4 | 13–4–1 |
| Indianapolis | 7–11 | 5–13 | 4–14–1 | — | 3–15 | 1–17 | 7–11 | 10–8 |
| New York | 10–7–1 | 6–11–1 | 8–10 | 15–3 | — | 7–10–3 | 12–6 | 10–8–1 |
| Philadelphia | 9–9 | 6–12–1 | 8–10 | 17–1 | 10–7–3 | — | 12–6 | 13–3–1 |
| Pittsburgh | 7–11 | 12–5–1 | 4–13 | 11–7 | 6–12 | 6–12 | — | 9–9 |
| Washington | 7–10–1 | 7–11 | 4–13–1 | 8–10 | 8–10–1 | 3–13–1 | 9–9 | — |

=== Roster ===
1887 Pittsburgh Alleghenys
Roster
| Pitchers: Bill Bishop; Pud Galvin; Jim McCormick; Ed Morris | Catchers: Doggie Miller; Infielders: Sam Barkley; Bill Kuehne; Alex McKinnon; Pop Smith; Art Whitney | Outfielders: Ed Beecher; Tom Brown; Fred Carroll; John Coleman; Abner Dalrymple; Jocko Fields | Manager: Horace B. Phillips |

== Player stats ==
=== Batting ===
==== Starters by position ====
Note: Pos = Position; G = Games played; AB = At bats; H = Hits; Avg. = Batting average; HR = Home runs; RBI = Runs batted in

| Pos | Player | G | AB | H | Avg. | HR | RBI |
|---|---|---|---|---|---|---|---|
| C | Doggie Miller | 87 | 342 | 83 | .243 | 1 | 34 |
| 1B | Sam Barkley | 89 | 340 | 76 | .224 | 1 | 35 |
| 2B | Pop Smith | 122 | 456 | 98 | .215 | 2 | 54 |
| SS | Bill Kuehne | 102 | 402 | 120 | .299 | 1 | 41 |
| 3B | Art Whitney | 119 | 431 | 112 | .260 | 0 | 51 |
| OF | John Coleman | 115 | 475 | 139 | .293 | 2 | 54 |
| OF | Abner Dalrymple | 92 | 358 | 76 | .212 | 2 | 31 |
| OF | Tom Brown | 47 | 192 | 47 | .245 | 0 | 6 |

==== Other batters ====
Note: G = Games played; AB = At bats; H = Hits; Avg. = Batting average; HR = Home runs; RBI = Runs batted in

| Player | G | AB | H | Avg. | HR | RBI |
|---|---|---|---|---|---|---|
| Fred Carroll | 102 | 421 | 138 | .328 | 6 | 54 |
| Alex McKinnon | 48 | 200 | 68 | .340 | 1 | 30 |
| Ed Beecher | 41 | 169 | 41 | .243 | 2 | 22 |
| Jocko Fields | 43 | 164 | 44 | .268 | 0 | 17 |

=== Pitching ===
==== Starting pitchers ====
Note: G = Games pitched; IP = Innings pitched; W = Wins; L = Losses; ERA = Earned run average; SO = Strikeouts

| Player | G | IP | W | L | ERA | SO |
|---|---|---|---|---|---|---|
| Pud Galvin | 49 | 440.2 | 28 | 21 | 3.29 | 76 |
| Jim McCormick | 36 | 322.1 | 13 | 23 | 4.30 | 77 |
| Ed Morris | 38 | 317.2 | 14 | 22 | 4.31 | 91 |
| Bill Bishop | 3 | 27.0 | 0 | 3 | 13.33 | 4 |

==== Relief pitchers ====
Note: G = Games pitched; W = Wins; L = Losses; SV = Saves; ERA = Earned run average; SO = Strikeouts

| Player | G | IP | W | L | ERA | SO |
|---|---|---|---|---|---|---|
| Jocko Fields | 1 | 0 | 0 | 0 | 0.00 | 0 |
