= 1887 Philadelphia Quakers season =

National League season

1887 Philadelphia Quakers
- League: National League
- Ballpark: Philadelphia Base Ball Grounds
- City: Philadelphia
- Record: 75–48 (.610)
- League place: 2nd
- Owners: Al Reach, John Rogers
- Manager: Harry Wright

The Philadelphia Quakers team, also known as "the Phillies," opened its 1887 season by playing a home game in its new ballpark on Saturday, April 30 against the New York Giants. Multiple civic and business leaders were in attendance.

== Preseason ==
The Phillies held spring training in Savannah, Georgia, leaving Philadelphia on March 15, 1887 by train from Broad Street Station. The Phillies trained in Savannah through March 25.

The Phillies opened their preseason City Series against the Athletics on April 4, 1887 at the Athletics' Jefferson Street Grounds. 9,183 tickets were sold to the game and an "immense crowd" turned out to see the Phillies win by a score of 10 to 2.

== Regular season ==
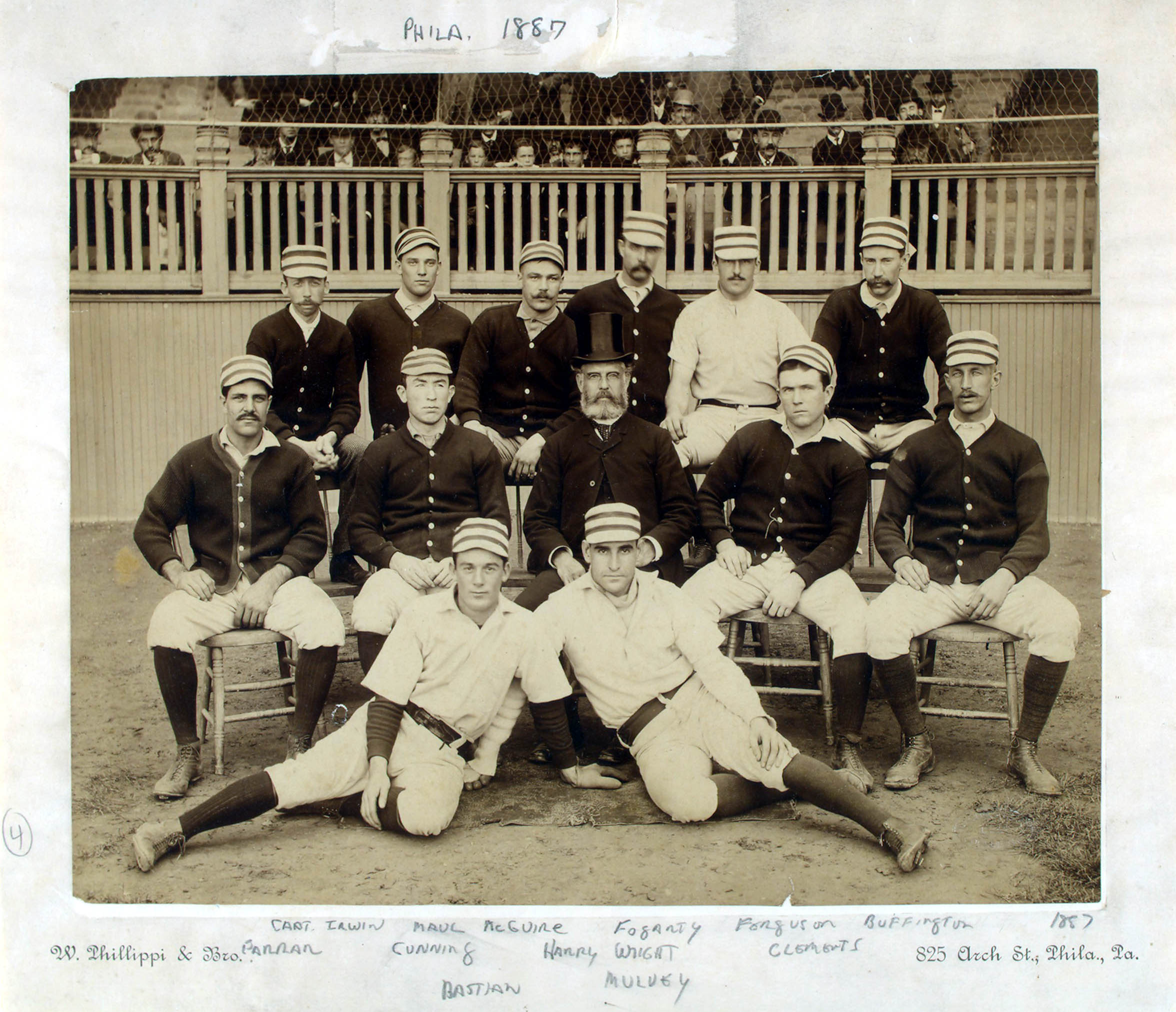
Philadelphia Phillies, 1887

The Phillies moved into their new ballpark at 15th and Huntingdon Streets in April 1887. The park was to have opened on April 4, 1887 for the City Series game against the Athletics but inclement weather delayed final construction.

The Phillies played their first game in the new ballpark on Saturday, April 30, 1887, the home opener against the New York Giants. 18,000 tickets were sold for the first game, with 13,000 in the stands and an additional 5,000 fans crowded onto the bicycle track which encircled the field and others in the terraces above left field. Philadelphia's Mayor Edwin Henry Fitler attended along with the city's political and business leadership, and many baseball leaders. The Phillies defeated New York 15 to 9.

=== Season standings ===
National League
Team	W	L	Pct.	GB	Home	Road
Detroit Wolverines	79	45	.637	—	44‍–‍17	35‍–‍28
Philadelphia Quakers	75	48	.610	3½	38‍–‍23	37‍–‍25
Chicago White Stockings	71	50	.587	6½	44‍–‍18	27‍–‍32
New York Giants	68	55	.553	10½	36‍–‍26	32‍–‍29
Boston Beaneaters	61	60	.504	16½	38‍–‍22	23‍–‍38
Pittsburgh Alleghenys	55	69	.444	24	31‍–‍33	24‍–‍36
Washington Nationals	46	76	.377	32	26‍–‍33	20‍–‍43
Indianapolis Hoosiers	37	89	.294	43	24‍–‍39	13‍–‍50

=== Record vs. opponents ===
1887 National League record Sources:
Team	BSN	CHI	DET	IND	NYG	PHI	PIT	WAS
Boston	—	6–9–3	17–11–1	11–7	7–10–1	9–9	11–7	10–7–1
Chicago	9–6–3	—	10–8	13–5	11–6–1	12–6–1	5–12–1	11–7
Detroit	11–7–1	8–10	—	14–4–1	10–8	10–8	13–4	13–4–1
Indianapolis	7–11	5–13	4–14–1	—	3–15	1–17	7–11	10–8
New York	10–7–1	6–11–1	8–10	15–3	—	7–10–3	12–6	10–8–1
Philadelphia	9–9	6–12–1	8–10	17–1	10–7–3	—	12–6	13–3–1
Pittsburgh	7–11	12–5–1	4–13	11–7	6–12	6–12	—	9–9
Washington	7–10–1	7–11	4–13–1	8–10	8–10–1	3–13–1	9–9	—

=== Notable transactions ===
- April 1887: Tom Gunning was purchased by the Phillies from the Boston Beaneaters.

=== Roster ===
1887 Philadelphia Quakers
Roster
Pitchers: Charlie Buffinton; Dan Casey; Jim Devlin; Charlie Ferguson	Catchers: Jack Clements; Andy Cusick; Tom Gunning; Deacon McGuire; Infielders: Charlie Bastian; Sid Farrar; Arthur Irwin; Barney McLaughlin; Joe Mulvey	Outfielders: Ed Andrews; Ed Daily; Jim Fogarty; Harry Lyons; Al Maul; Tommy McCarthy; George Wood	Manager: Harry Wright

== Player stats ==
=== Batting ===
==== Starters by position ====
Note: Pos = Position; G = Games played; AB = At bats; H = Hits; Avg. = Batting average; HR = Home runs; RBI = Runs batted in

Pos	Player	G	AB	H	Avg.	HR	RBI
C	Jack Clements	66	246	69	.280	1	47
1B	Sid Farrar	116	443	125	.282	4	72
2B	Barney McLaughlin	50	205	45	.220	1	26
SS	Arthur Irwin	100	374	95	.254	2	56
3B	Joe Mulvey	111	474	136	.287	2	78
OF	Jim Fogarty	126	495	129	.261	8	50
OF	Ed Andrews	104	464	151	.325	4	67
OF	George Wood	113	491	142	.289	14	66

==== Other batters ====
Note: G = Games played; AB = At bats; H = Hits; Avg. = Batting average; HR = Home runs; RBI = Runs batted in

Player	G	AB	H	Avg.	HR	RBI
Charlie Bastian	60	221	47	.213	1	21
Deacon McGuire	41	150	46	.307	2	23
Ed Daily	26	106	30	.283	1	17
Tom Gunning	28	104	27	.260	1	16
Tommy McCarthy	18	70	13	.186	0	6
Al Maul	16	56	17	.304	1	4
Andy Cusick	7	24	7	.292	0	5
Harry Lyons	1	4	0	.000	0	0

=== Pitching ===
==== Starting pitchers ====
Note: G = Games pitched; IP = Innings pitched; W = Wins; L = Losses; ERA = Earned run average; SO = Strikeouts

Player	G	IP	W	L	ERA	SO
Dan Casey	45	390.1	28	13	2.86	119
Charlie Buffinton	40	332.1	21	17	3.66	160
Charlie Ferguson	37	297.1	22	10	3.00	125
Ed Daily	6	41.1	0	4	7.19	7
Jim Devlin	2	18.0	0	2	6.00	6

==== Other pitchers ====
Note: G = Games pitched; IP = Innings pitched; W = Wins; L = Losses; ERA = Earned run average; SO = Strikeouts

Player	G	IP	W	L	ERA	SO
Al Maul	7	50.1	4	2	5.54	18

==== Relief pitchers ====
Note: G = Games pitched; W = Wins; L = Losses; SV = Saves; ERA = Earned run average; SO = Strikeouts

Player	G	W	L	SV	ERA	SO
Jim Fogarty	1	0	0	0	9.00	0
