= Roger Carey =

American baseball player (1865–1895)

- Second baseman
- Born: 1865; New York City, New York, U.S.
- Died: February 8, 1895 (aged 29–30); New York City, New York, U.S.
- Batted: Unknown Threw: Unknown

MLB debut
- July 9, 1887, for the New York Giants

Last MLB appearance
- July 9, 1889, for the New York Giants

MLB statistics
- Batting average: .000
- Home runs: 0
- Runs scored: 0
- Stats at Baseball Reference

Teams
- New York Giants (1887)

Roger J. Carey (1865 – February 8, 1895) was an American Major League Baseball player who played in one game for the 1887 New York Giants.
