= William Burke (baseball) =

American baseball player (1865–1939)

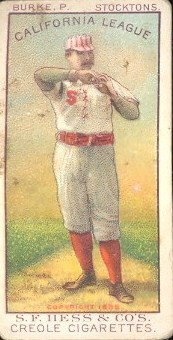
- Pitcher / Right fielder
- Born: November 1865; Cincinnati, Ohio, U.S.
- Died: March 17, 1939 (aged 73); Atchison, Kansas, U.S.
- Batted: Unknown Threw: Right

MLB debut
- July 20, 1887, for the Detroit Wolverines

Last MLB appearance
- August 9, 1887, for the Detroit Wolverines

MLB statistics
- Batting average: .250
- Home runs: 0
- Runs batted in: 1
- Win–loss record: 0–1
- Earned run average: 6.00
- Strikeouts: 3
- Stats at Baseball Reference

Teams
- Detroit Wolverines (1887)

William R. Burke (November, 1865 – March 17, 1939) was an American professional baseball pitcher and outfielder, who played in 1887 with the Detroit Wolverines, of the National League. He threw right-handed. Burke had a 0–1 record, with a 6.00 ERA, in two games, in his one-year career. He also had 2 hits in 8 at-bats.
