= Bill Swarback =

American baseball player (1867–1949)

- Pitcher
- Born: October 1867; New York City
- Died: May 17, 1949 (aged 81); Stamford, Connecticut
- Batted: Unknown Threw: Unknown

MLB debut
- July 9, 1887, for the New York Giants

Last MLB appearance
- July 12, 1887, for the New York Giants

MLB statistics
- Win–loss record: 0-2
- Earned run average: 5.06
- Strikeouts: 6

Teams
- New York Giants (1887)

William Swarback (1867–1949) was a 19th-century Major League Baseball player. He played for the New York Giants in 1887.
