= Bill Wright (catcher) =

American baseball player (1864–1940)

- Catcher
- Born: October 4, 1864; Washington, D.C.
- Died: February 6, 1940 (aged 75); Washington, D.C.

MLB debut
- September 16, 1887, for the Washington Nationals

Last MLB appearance
- September 16, 1887, for the Washington Nationals

MLB statistics
- Batting average: .667
- At bats: 3
- Hits: 2
- Stats at Baseball Reference

Teams
- Washington Nationals (1887)

William Hiram Wright (October 4, 1864 – February 6, 1940) was an American professional baseball player, He played in one game in Major League Baseball as a catcher for the Washington Nationals in 1887.
