= Emil Geiss =

American baseball player (1867–1911)

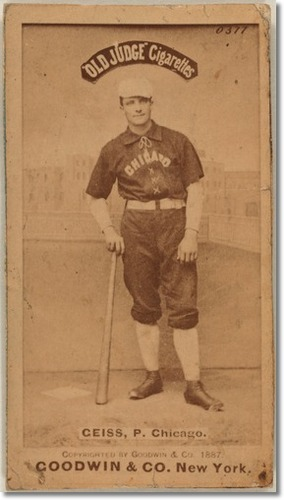
- Pitcher/Infielder
- Born: March 20, 1867; Chicago, Illinois, U.S.
- Died: October 4, 1911 (aged 44); Chicago, Illinois, U.S.
- Batted: Right Threw: Right

MLB debut
- May 18, 1887, for the Chicago White Stockings

Last MLB appearance
- June 22, 1887, for the Chicago White Stockings

MLB statistics
- Win–loss record: 0–1
- Strikeouts: 4
- Earned run average: 8.00
- Batting average: .083
- Stats at Baseball Reference

Teams
- Chicago White Stockings (1887)

Emil August Geiss (March 20, 1867 – October 4, 1911) was an American professional baseball player who was a pitcher and infielder for one season in Major League Baseball. He appeared in three games for the 1887 Chicago White Stockings; one as a pitcher, one at first base, and one at second base. His brother, Bill Geiss, played parts of 1882 and 1884 at the major league level.
