= Sam Thompson (outfielder) =

American baseball player (1860–1922)

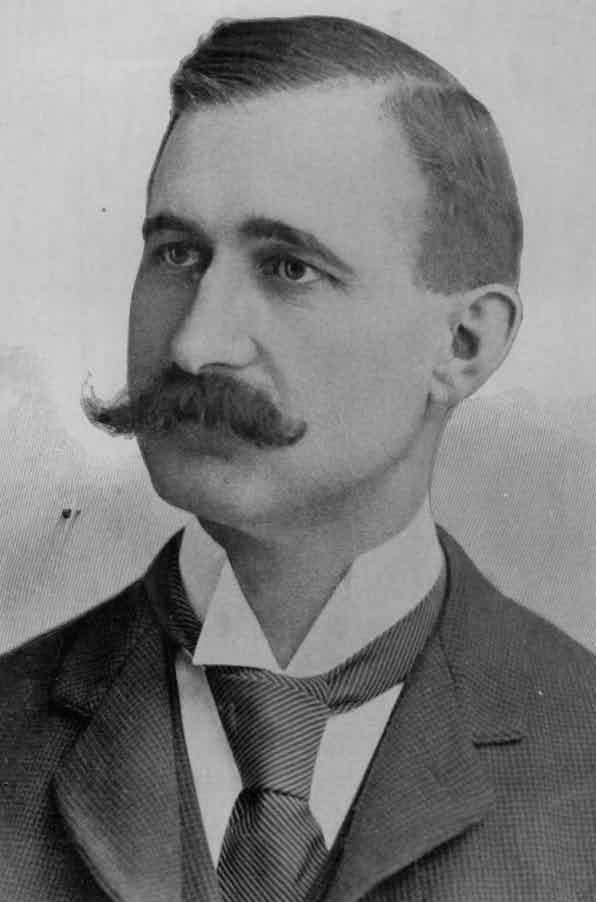
- Right fielder
- Born: March 5, 1860; Danville, Indiana, U.S.
- Died: November 7, 1922 (aged 62); Detroit, Michigan, U.S.
- Batted: Left Threw: Left

MLB debut
- July 2, 1885, for the Detroit Wolverines

Last MLB appearance
- September 10, 1906, for the Detroit Tigers

MLB statistics
- Batting average: .331
- Home runs: 126
- Runs batted in: 1,308
- Stats at Baseball Reference

Teams
- Detroit Wolverines (1885–1888); Philadelphia Quakers / Phillies (1889–1898); Detroit Tigers (1906)

Career highlights and awards
- NL batting champion (1887) (Note: In 1887, Major League Baseball counted bases on balls (walks) as hits. Thompson was credited with a .407 batting average, whereas Cap Anson topped him with a .421 batting average, winning the National League batting title. When bases on balls were removed from players’ batting averages to normalize the 1887 records, Thompson became the batting average leader at .372, topping Anson’s average of .347.); 2× NL home run leader (1889, 1895); 3× NL RBI leader (1887, 1894, 1895); Philadelphia Phillies jersey retired; Philadelphia Phillies Wall of Fame

Member of the National

Baseball Hall of Fame
- Induction: 1974
- Election method: Veterans Committee

Samuel Luther Thompson (March 5, 1860 – November 7, 1922), nicknamed "Big Sam", was an American professional baseball right fielder from 1884 to 1898 and with a brief comeback in 1906. At 6 feet 2 inches (1.88 m), the Indiana native was one of the larger players of his day and was known for his prominent handlebar mustache. He played as a right fielder in Major League Baseball for the Detroit Wolverines (1885–1888), Philadelphia Phillies (1889–1898) and Detroit Tigers (1906). He was inducted into the Baseball Hall of Fame in 1974.

Thompson had a .331 career batting average and was one of the most prolific run producers in baseball history. His career run batted in (RBI) to games played ratio of .923 (1,305 RBIs in 1,410 games) remains the highest in major league history. In 1895, Thompson averaged 1.44 RBIs per game, and his 166 RBIs in 1887 (in only 127 games) remained the major league record until 1921 when Babe Ruth collected 168 (albeit in 152 games). Thompson still holds the major league record for most RBIs in a single month with 61 in August 1894 while playing for the Phillies. Manager Bill Watkins in 1922 called Thompson "the greatest natural hitter of all time." He was the tenth player with 2,000 career hits, doing so in 1898.

Defensively, Thompson was known to have one of the strongest arms of any outfielder in the early decades of the game. He still ranks among the all-time major league leaders with 61 double plays from the outfield (16th all time) and 283 outfield assists (12th all time). Thompson also had good speed on the base paths and, in 1889, he became the first major league player to reach 20 home runs and 20 stolen bases in the same season.

== Early years ==
Thompson was born in Danville, Indiana, in 1860. He was the fifth of eleven children born to Jesse and Rebecca Thompson. He was educated at the Danville Graded School. After reaching adulthood, Thompson became employed as a carpenter in Danville. He and five of his brothers also played on a local baseball team known as the Danville Browns.

== Baseball career ==
=== Evansville and Indianapolis ===
In July 1884, Thompson began his professional baseball career at age 24, playing for the Evansville, Indiana, team in the Northwestern League. A scout for Evansville travelled to Danville and was referred to "Big Sam", who was working on a roof in Stinesville. Thompson was initially reluctant to give up his carpentry career and travel 150 miles to Evansville, but he ultimately agreed to give it a try. Unfortunately, the league folded in early August 1884, after only five games. In five games at Evansville, Thompson compiled a .391 batting average.

Thompson signed with the Indianapolis Hoosiers of the newly formed Western League in 1885. He compiled a .321 average in 30 games with the Hoosiers. He was approached by a Union Association team and offered more money, but in a show of "steadfastness to his word", Thompson refused the offer and remained with Indianapolis at a pay of $100 per month. The Hoosiers were the dominant team in the Western League, compiling an .880 winning percentage.

=== Detroit Wolverines ===
==== Signing ====
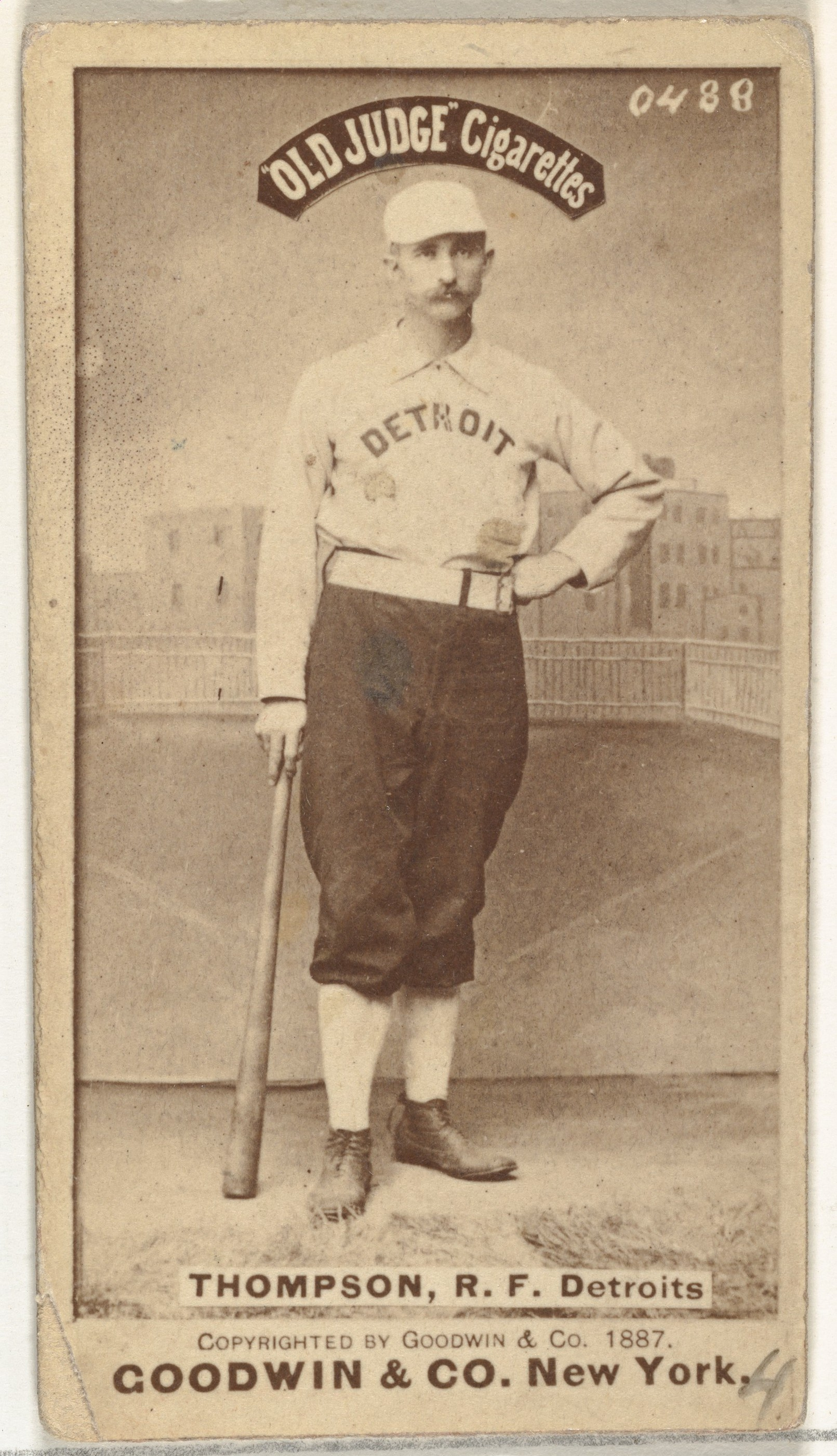
Samuel Luther "Sam" Thompson, 1887, Detroit Wolverines. Burdick Collection, Metropolitan Museum of Art

In mid June 1885, the Western League disbanded, and a mad rush developed to sign the players on the Indianapolis roster, a line-up that included Thompson, Deacon McGuire, Sam Crane, Chub Collins, Jim Donnelly, Mox McQuery, Gene Moriarty, and Dan Casey.

Thompson later told the colorful story of his acquisition by Detroit. Detroit sent two representatives (Marsh and Maloney) to Indianapolis, principally to sign the Hoosiers' battery of Larry McKeon and Jim Keenan. The Wolverines were outbid by the Cincinnati Reds for McKeon and Keenan but wound up with the Hoosiers' manager (Bill Watkins) and the rest of the team's starting lineup. The only catch was that a 10-day waiting period would allow other teams to outbid Detroit. Marsh and Maloney promptly sent the players to Detroit and quartered them in a hotel there. The next morning, the players were told that the team had arranged a fishing trip for them. The players boarded the steamship Annette and enjoyed the first day and night of successful fishing. After three days, the players became suspicious, but the ship captain laughed when asked when they would return to Detroit. As the players became mutinous on the sixth day, the captain admitted he had been ordered to keep them "out at sea" for 10 days. In another account, Thompson described his 10 days aboard the Annette as follows:

"We were prisoners, but well cared-for prisoners. Anything in the line of creature comforts you could find packed away on ice. We lived on the best in the market, and spent the rest of the time in fishing and playing poker, chips having very thoughtfully been provided. On the night of the tenth day, at midnight, we were all taken ashore where Watkins met us and signed us to our contracts."

The players were only later presented with their accumulated mail which included scores of offers from other clubs. A writer in the Detroit Free Press later noted: "Detroit magnates showed some inside baseball brains and great finessing in sending the players away from all tempters for that period when they belonged to no club."

Regardless of the trickery by Detroit, Thompson considered Detroit to be a mecca. He recalled his first time in 1885 viewing Woodward Avenue with Indianapolis teammate Mox McQuery. They gazed with "open-mouth amazement" at the "wondrous pavements", having never seen a street as "clean and smooth as a table."

==== 1885 and 1886 seasons ====
Thompson joined the Wolverines lineup in early July. In his first plate appearance, he had a hit off New York Giants' Hall of Fame pitcher Tim Keefe. The Wolverines were in last place when Thompson joined the club, but won 12 of their first 13 games after Thompson took over in right field. Thompson compiled a .303 batting average in 63 games. Despite playing only the second half of his rookie season, Thompson ranked among the National League leaders with seven home runs (third most in the league) and nine triples (10th most in the league). Displaying a strong arm that would be one of the main features of his defensive game, Thompson also ranked fifth in the league with 24 outfield assists in only 63 games.

In 1886, team owner Frederick K. Stearns made a big splash when he purchased the Buffalo infield that had become known as the "Big Four", consisting of Dan Brouthers, Hardy Richardson, Jack Rowe, and Deacon White. In addition, Detroit pitcher Lady Baldwin won 42 games in 1886, a major league record for a left-handed pitcher. The 1886 season was Thompson's first full season in the majors. Thompson made a major contribution to the 1886 club as well, compiling a .310 batting average with 101 runs scored, 13 triples, and eight home runs in 122 games. His 89 runs batted in (RBIs) ranked third in the National League. His defensive statistics continued to impress as well. He led the league with 11 double plays from the outfield, ranked second with a .945 fielding percentage, and was fourth in the league with 194 outfield putouts. The 1886 Wolverines compiled an impressive 87–36 record (.707 winning percentage), but lost the National League pennant, finishing 2½ games behind the Chicago White Stockings.

==== 1887 season ====
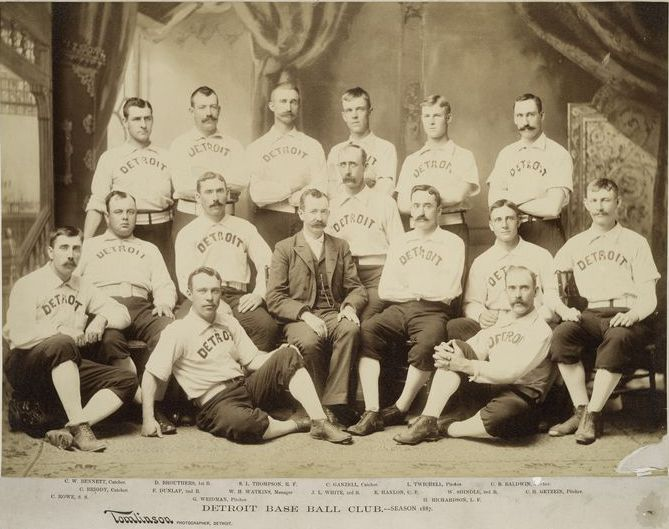
1887 Detroit Wolverines -- Thompson 3rd from left in back row

Thompson had his breakout season in 1887 when he won the National League batting crown with .372 batting average, and he set a major league record with 166 RBIs. Thompson also led the league in hits (203), triples (23), slugging percentage (.565), total bases (308), and at bats (545). On May 7, 1887, Thompson became the first player in major league history to hit two triples with the bases loaded in the same game. The 1887 Detroit Wolverines featured four future Hall of Fame inductees (Thompson, Dan Brouthers, Deacon White, and Ned Hanlon) and won the National League pennant with a 79–45 record. The Wolverines then went on to defeat the St. Louis Browns of the American Association in a 15-game World Series challenge. Thompson played in all 15 games of the World Series and led all hitters with a .362 average, two home runs, seven RBIs and a .621 slugging percentage.

==== 1888 season ====
During the 1888 season, Thompson was sidelined with a sore arm during most of the season and appeared in only 56 games. His batting average declined by 90 points to .282, and the fortunes of the entire 1888 Detroit team followed suit. The team finished in fifth place with a 68–63 record. With high salaries owed to the team's star players, and gate receipts declining markedly, the team folded in October 1888 season with the players being sold to other teams.

=== Philadelphia Phillies ===
==== 1889–1892 ====
On October 16, 1888, Thompson was purchased from the Wolverines by the Philadelphia Quakers (known as the Philadelphia Phillies beginning in 1890), for $5,000 cash (equal to $179,167 today).

In his first season with Philadelphia, Thompson hit .296 and led the National League with a career-high 20 home runs. He also became the first major league player to reach 20 home runs and 20 stolen bases (Thompson stole 24 bases) in the same season. Thompson improved his batting average to .313 in 1890 and led the league in both hits (172) and doubles (41). Thompson's batting average dipped slightly below .300 in 1891 (.294) but bounced back in 1892 to .305. In each of his first four seasons with the Phillies, Thompson finished among the league leaders in total bases and RBIs. He ranked third in total bases in 1889 (262), 1890 (243), and 1893 (263), second in RBIs in 1892 (104), and third in RBIs in 1890 (102). He also tallied a career-high 32 outfield assists to lead the National League in 1891. (It has been suggested that Thompson's assist and home run totals in Philadelphia were aided by the short 300-foot right field fence at the Huntingdon Street Grounds.) The Phillies were a good, but not great team, during Thompson's first four years in Philadelphia, finishing in fourth place in 1889, 1891 and 1892, and in third place in 1890.

==== 1893–1895 ====
From 1893 to 1895, Thompson hit his stride with the Phillies. During those three years, he hit .390 and averaged 207 hits, 125 runs, 146 RBIs, 21 triples, and 24 stolen bases. And he compiled those numbers while striking out an average of only 14 times per season. Despite Thompson's contributions, the Phillies were unable to compete for the National League pennant, finishing in fourth place in 1893 and 1894 and in third place in 1895.

Thompson's 1893 totals included a league-leading 222 hits and 37 doubles. After the 1893 season, Thompson vowed not to return to Philadelphia in protest over the owners' penny-pinching ways and the team's inability to compete for a pennant. In October 1893, Thompson announced: "I shall not play again in Philadelphia, and I told Harry Wright it would be a waste of time for him to write to me about signing. The cheese-paring methods of the management ... have been the causes leading to my resolution. ... The management [has] made a barrel of money, but they grind the players into the dirt." Thompson finally agreed in March 1894 to return to the Phillies, but only after management agreed to improve travel accommodations.

In 1894, Thompson was part of the only all-.400-hitting outfield of all time. All four Philadelphia outfielders ended the season with a batting average better than .400 (Tuck Turner at .416, Thompson and Ed Delahanty at .407, and Billy Hamilton at .404). Thompson missed a month from the 1894 season with an injury to the little finger on his left hand. Doctors determined that the smaller bones in the finger were dead, and portions of the finger were surgically removed in mid-May 1894. Despite the injury and partial amputation, and being limited to only 102 games, Thompson compiled a .407 batting average with a career-high 28 triples and a league-leading 147 RBIs. His 1894 ratio of 1.44 RBIs per game remains the all-time major league record. Also, his 28 triples was the second highest total in major league history up to that time and remains the fifth highest of all time. Thompson also led the National League with a career-high .696 slugging percentage, and he hit for the cycle on August 17, 1894.

In 1895, Thompson compiled a .392 batting average with 211 hits in 119 games and led the National League in slugging percentage (.654), total bases (352), extra base hits (84), home runs (18), and RBIs (165). His average of 1.39 RBIs per game in 1895 remains second in major league history—trailing Thompson's 1.44 ratio in 1894. Thompson also continued to perform well defensively with 31 outfield assists, second most in the league. From June 11 to 21, Thompson had 6 consecutive games with at least 3 or more hits. Since then, only Jimmy Johnston (June 24–30, 1923) and George Brett (May 8–13, 1976) had 6 straight games with at least 3 or more hits.

==== 1896–1898 ====
At age 36, Thompson played his last full season of professional baseball in 1896. His average dipped to .298, but he still managed to collect 100 RBIs. Thompson's throwing remained strong as he turned in one of the finest defensive performances of his career. Despite appearing in only 119 games in the outfield, he led the league in outfield fielding percentage (.974), outfield assists (28), and double plays from the outfield (11). One sports writer noted that, even at age 38, Thompson "possessed an arm that the fastest sprinters in the big league had a lot of respect for." As a team, however, the Phillies fell to eighth place in the National League with a 62–68 record.

In 1897, at age 37, Thompson was sidelined by pain and appeared in only three games. Some accounts suggest that Thompson's absence from the lineup may have also been the result of his not getting along with Philadelphia's new manager George Stallings. Without Thompson, the 1897 Phillies dropped to 10th place with a 55–77 record.

Before the 1898 season began, Thompson gave an interview in which he questioned the Phillies chances to compete in 1898: "What are the Phillies' chances this season? Six clubs, Cincinnati Baltimore, Boston, New York, Cleveland and Brooklyn are bound to beat them, and they will have to fight hard to lead the second division, and I very much doubt if they can do that." Though his loyalty to the Phillies was questioned, Thompson did return in 1898 and was batting .349 with 15 RBIs, five doubles, three triples, a home run after 14 games. However, Thompson opted to leave the team in May 1898 and return to his home in Detroit. His sudden retirement has been attributed to a "combination of homesickness and chronic back pain." Other accounts indicate that continued tension with manager Stallings contributed to Thompson's decision to retire.

=== Detroit Tigers ===
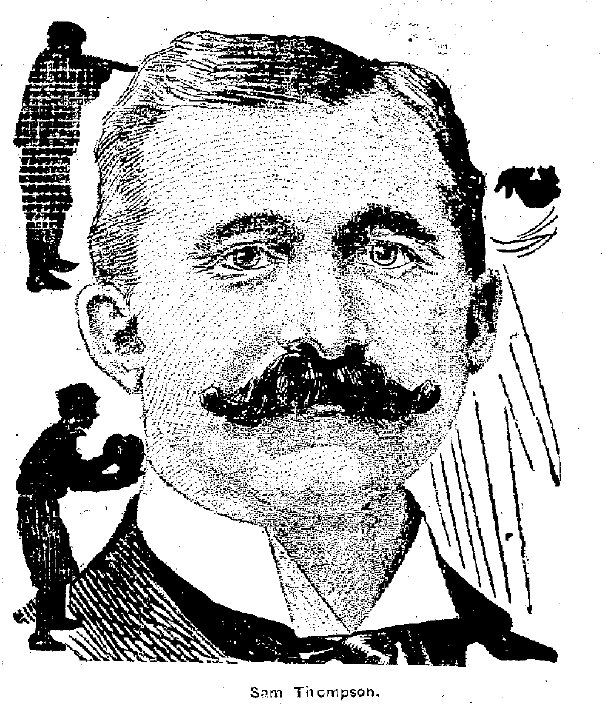
Thompson in 1908

Late in the 1906 baseball season, Thompson briefly returned to the major leagues as a player for the Detroit Tigers. With starting outfielders Ty Cobb and Davy Jones out of the Tigers lineup with injuries, Thompson volunteered to fill in. At age 46, Thompson had remained active, playing baseball for the Detroit Athletic Club and other local teams. Accordingly, in late August and early September 1906, he took his old place in right field for Detroit. Thompson's return to baseball led to an increase in attendance, as "the stands and bleachers were full of special Thompson delegations." After getting a hit and two RBIs in his first game, he totaled seven hits, four runs, three RBIs and a triple in eight games with the Tigers. At age 46, he became the oldest player to hit a triple in the major leagues. (This record was broken in 1924 by Nick Altrock.) Detroit sports writer Paul H. Bruske noted that Thompson was still able to throw the ball from deep right field to the plate "on a line" and that he still had "a lot of speed on the bases."

=== Career statistics and legacy ===
In 15 major league seasons, Thompson compiled a .331 batting average with 1,988 hits, 343 doubles, 161 triples, 126 home runs, 1,305 RBIs, and 232 stolen bases. He was inducted into the Baseball Hall of Fame in 1974.

Thompson was one of the most prolific run producers in baseball history. His career RBI to games played ratio of .923 (1,305 RBIs in 1,410 games) remains the highest in major league history, higher even than Lou Gehrig (.921), Hank Greenberg (.915), Joe DiMaggio (.885), and Babe Ruth (.884). In 1895, Thompson averaged 1.44 RBIs per game (147 RBIs in 102 games), still a major league record. His 166 RBIs in 1887 (in only 127 games) was 62 more than anyone else in the league that year, and it stood as the major league record until 1921 when Babe Ruth collected 168 (albeit in 152 games). Thompson still holds the major league record for most RBIs in a single month with 61 in August 1894 while playing for the Phillies.

Thompson was also one of the best power hitters of the era before Babe Ruth. At the end of the 19th century, Thompson's 126 career home runs ranked second only to Roger Connor. Defensively, Thompson still ranks among the all-time major league leaders with 61 double plays from the outfield (16th all time) and 283 outfield assists (12th all time). Thompson has also been credited by baseball historians with perfecting "the art of throwing the ball to the plate on one bounce, which catchers found easier to handle than the usual throw on the fly." Bill Watkins, who managed Thompson in Detroit, recalled: "He was a fine fielder and had a cannon arm and will live in my memory as the greatest natural hitter of all time."

In a 1913 story on Thompson, Detroit sports writer Maclean Kennedy noted that Thompson's drives "were the direct cause of more hats being smashed, more backs that were thumped til they were black and blue by some wild-eyed fan sitting in the seat behind, more outbursts of frenzied shrieks and howls of glee, than those of any other player who ever wore a Detroit uniform", barring only the two great stars of the day, Ty Cobb and Sam Crawford.

== Family and later years ==
Thompson was married in 1888 to Ida Morasha of Detroit. They had no children and made their home in Detroit until Thompson's death. After retiring from baseball, Thompson invested in real estate and was financially comfortable in his later years. He was appointed a U.S. Deputy Marshall during World War I and also worked as the crier in the courtroom of U.S. District Court Judge Arthur J. Tuttle. He was "well known" and a "well liked" figure at the federal building in Detroit.

Thompson died in 1922 at age 62. He had a heart attack while serving as an election inspector on November 7 and was stricken again later in the morning after being taken to his home located at 6468 Trumbull Avenue in Detroit. Upon learning of Thompson's death, his former Detroit manager Bill Watkins recalled Thompson as "not only a great baseball player, but as one of the finest gentlemen I ever knew." At Thompson's funeral, "Michigan's foremost citizens – state and city officials, judges, bankers, doctors, millionaires, laborers – paid homage ... to their beloved friend", and the neighborhood in which Thompson lived "was packed with expensive automobiles and their liveried chauffeurs" as workmen and wealthy men "discussed their favorite player with an unusual spirit of camaraderie." Thompson was interred at the historic Elmwood Cemetery in Detroit.

== See also ==
- 1887 Detroit Wolverines season
- List of Major League Baseball career runs scored leaders
- List of Major League Baseball career runs batted in leaders
- List of Major League Baseball career triples leaders
- List of Major League Baseball batting champions
- List of Major League Baseball annual home run leaders
- List of Major League Baseball annual runs batted in leaders
- List of Major League Baseball annual doubles leaders
- List of Major League Baseball annual triples leaders
- List of Major League Baseball players to hit for the cycle
- List of Major League Baseball single-game hits leaders

== Notes ==
Preceded by Bill Hassamaer	Hitting for the cycle August 17, 1894	Succeeded by Tom Parrott
