= Bill Stemmyer =

American baseball player (1865–1945)

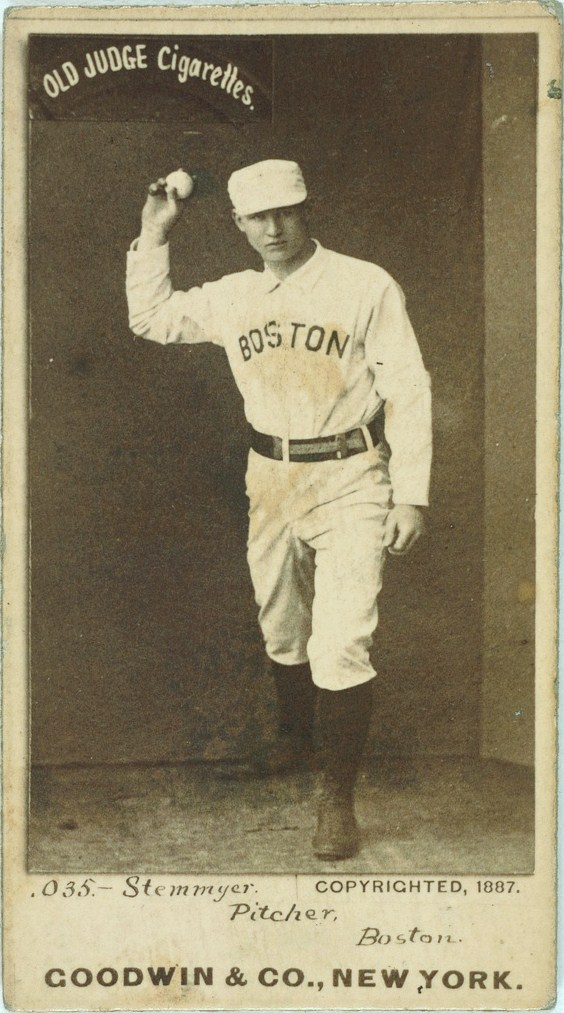
- Pitcher
- Born: May 6, 1865; Cleveland, Ohio
- Died: May 3, 1945 (aged 79); Cleveland, Ohio
- Batted: Right Threw: Right

MLB debut
- October 3, 1885, for the Boston Beaneaters

Last MLB appearance
- June 15, 1888, for the Cleveland Blues

MLB statistics
- Win–loss record: 29-29
- Earned run average: 3.67
- Strikeouts: 295
- Stats at Baseball Reference

Teams
- Boston Beaneaters (1885–1887); Cleveland Blues (1888)

William Stemmyer (May 6, 1865 – May 3, 1945) was a Major League Baseball pitcher for the Boston Beaneaters and Cleveland Blues. He was nicknamed "Cannonball".

In 1886 – his first and only full season in the majors – Stemmyer led the National League in strikeouts per 9 innings (6.17) and wild pitches (63). The 63 wild pitches is still the highest single-season total in National League history.

Stemmyer died in his hometown at age 79.

== See also ==
- List of Major League Baseball annual saves leaders
