= List of Major League Baseball stolen base records =

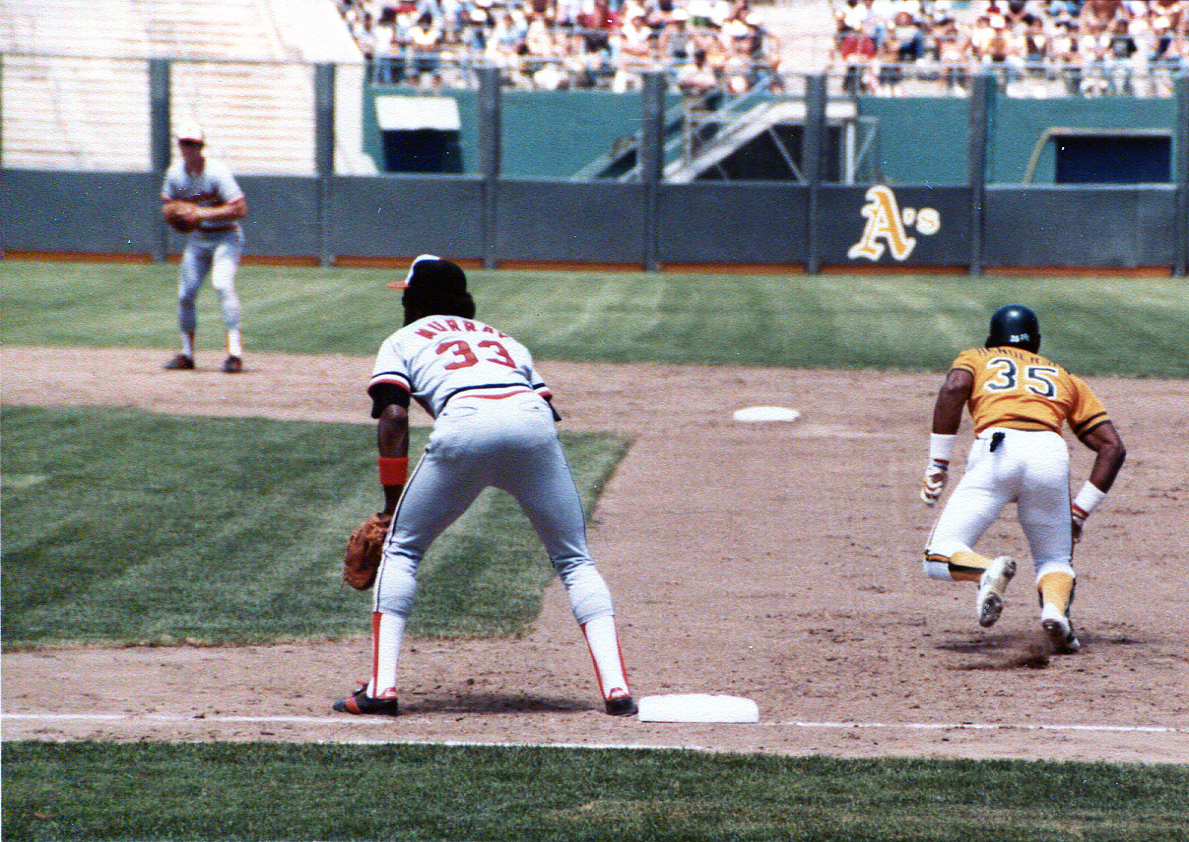
Rickey Henderson, shown here attempting to steal a base in 1983, is the MLB career leader in stolen bases.

This article lists records for stolen bases within Major League Baseball (MLB). For individual players, leaders in stolen bases for a career, single season, and single game are provided, along with leaders in stolen base percentage for a single season and career. Team records for stolen bases in a single season are also provided.

Stolen bases were not officially noted in a baseball game's summary until 1886, and it was not until 1888 that it officially earned a place in baseball's box score. The modern rule for stolen bases was adopted in 1898. While some sources do not include stolen base records before 1898—because they are difficult to compare to the era after 1898—as the sourcing on the below list indicates, Major League Baseball continues to recognize them.

== Individual records ==
=== Career stolen base leaders ===
Major League Baseball Career Stolen Base Leaders
No.	Player	SB	Teams and seasons
1	Rickey Henderson	1,406	1979–1984, 89–93, 94–95, 98 (Oakland Athletics), 1985–1989 (New York Yankees), 1993 (Toronto Blue Jays), 1996–97, 2001 (San Diego Padres), 1997 (Anaheim Angels), 1999–2000 (New York Mets), 2000 (Seattle Mariners), 2002 (Boston Red Sox), 2003 (Los Angeles Dodgers)
2	Lou Brock	938	1961–1964 (Chicago Cubs), 1964–1979 (St. Louis Cardinals)
3	Billy Hamilton	912	1888–89 (Kansas City Blues (AA)), 1890–1895 (Philadelphia Phillies), 1896–1901 (Boston Beaneaters)
4	Ty Cobb	892	1905–1926 (Detroit Tigers), 1927–28 (Philadelphia Athletics)
5	Tim Raines	808	1979–1990, 2001 (Montreal Expos), 1991–1995 (Chicago White Sox), 1996–1998 (New York Yankees), 1999 (Oakland Athletics), 2001 (Baltimore Orioles), 2002 (Florida Marlins)
6	Vince Coleman	752	1985–1990 (St. Louis Cardinals), 1991–1993, (New York Mets), 1994–95 (Kansas City Royals), 1995 (Seattle Mariners), 1996 (Cincinnati Reds), 1997 (Detroit Tigers)
7	Eddie Collins	745	1906–1914, 27–30 (Philadelphia Athletics), 1915–1926 (Chicago White Sox)
8	Arlie Latham	739	1880 (Buffalo Bisons), 1883–1889, 96 (St. Louis Browns), 1890 (Chicago Pirates), 1890–1895 (Cincinnati Reds), 1899 (Washington Senators), 1909 (New York Giants)
9	Max Carey	738	1910–1926 (Pittsburgh Pirates), 26–29 (Brooklyn Robins)
10	Honus Wagner	722	1897–1899 (Louisville Colonels), 1900–1917 (Pittsburgh Pirates)
11	Joe Morgan	689	1963–1971, 80 (Houston Colt 45's/Astros), 1972–1979 (Cincinnati Reds), 1981–82 (San Francisco Giants), 1983 (Philadelphia Phillies), 1984 (Oakland Athletics)
12	Willie Wilson	668	1976–1990 (Kansas City Royals), 1991–92 (Oakland Athletics), 1993–94 (Chicago Cubs)
13	Tom Brown	657	1882 (Baltimore Orioles (AA)), 1883–84 (Columbus Colts (AA)), 1885–1887 (Pittsburgh Pirates), 1887 (Indianapolis Hoosiers), 1888–89 (Boston Beaneaters), 1890–91 (Boston Reds (PL-AA)), 1892–1894 (Louisville Colonels), 1895 (St. Louis Cardinals), 1895–1898 (Washington Senators)
14	Bert Campaneris	649	1964–1976 (KC-Oak Athletics), 1977–1979 (Texas Rangers), 1979–1981 (California Angels), 1983 (New York Yankees)
15	Kenny Lofton	622	1991 (Houston Astros), 1992–1996, 98–2001, 07 (Cleveland Indians), 1997 (Atlanta Braves), 2002 (Chicago White Sox), 2002 (San Francisco Giants), 2003 (Chicago Cubs), 2003 (Pittsburgh Pirates), 2004 (New York Yankees), 2005 (Philadelphia Phillies), 2007 (Texas Rangers)
16	Otis Nixon	620	1983 (New York Yankees), 1984–1987 (Cleveland Indians), 1988–1990 (Montreal Expos), 1991–1993, 99 (Atlanta Braves), 1994 (Boston Red Sox), 1995 (Texas Rangers), 1996–97 (Toronto Blue Jays), 1997 (Los Angeles Dodgers), 1998 (Minnesota Twins)
17	George Davis	616	1890–1892 (Cleveland Spiders), 1893–1901, 03 (New York Giants), 1902, 1904–1909 (Chicago White Sox)
18	Juan Pierre	614	2000–2002 (Colorado Rockies), 2003–2005 (Florida Marlins), 2006 (Chicago Cubs), 2007–2009 (Los Angeles Dodgers), 2010–11 (Chicago White Sox), 2012 (Philadelphia Phillies), 2013 (Miami Marlins)
19	Dummy Hoy	594	1888–89 (Washington Nationals), 1890 (Buffalo Bisons), 1891 (St. Louis Browns), 1892–93 (Washington Senators), 1894–1897 (Cincinnati Reds), 1898–99 (Louisville Colonels), 1901 (Chicago White Sox), 1902 (Cincinnati Reds)
20	Maury Wills	586	1959–1966 (Los Angeles Dodgers), 1967–68 (Pittsburgh Pirates), 1969 (Montreal Expos), 1969–1972 (Los Angeles Dodgers)

Source: (Note: Historical totals reported by other sources may vary—for example, Baseball-Reference.com ranks Arlie Latham ahead of Eddie Collins, with totals of 742 and 741, respectively.)

Entering the 2024 MLB season, only one active player has 300 or more career stolen bases: Starling Marte.

==== Career stolen bases leaders, top 10 by league ====
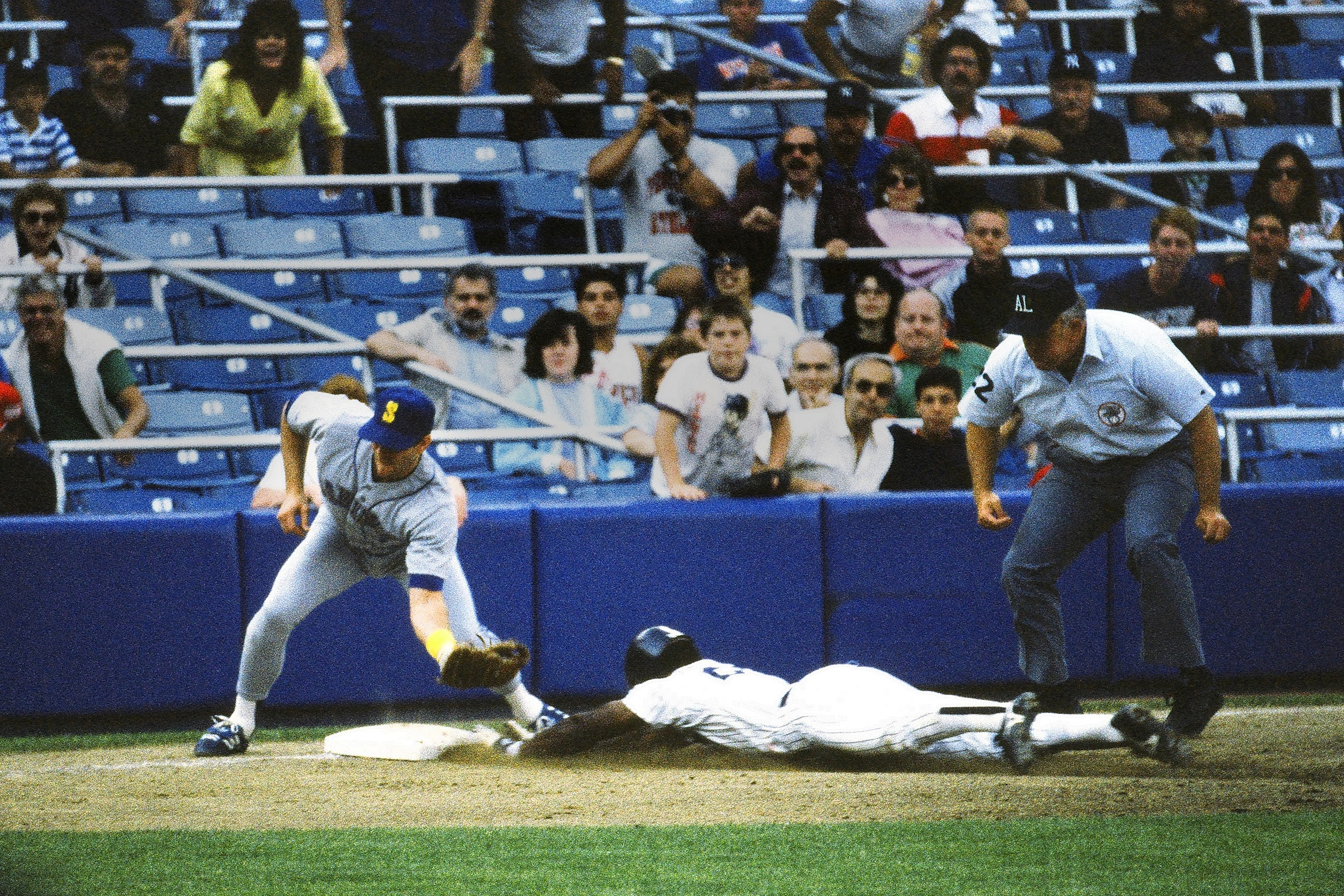
Rickey Henderson steals a base as a member of the New York Yankees in 1988

No.	American League	SB	National League	SB
1	Rickey Henderson	1270	Lou Brock	938
2	Ty Cobb	892	Billy Hamilton	782
3	Eddie Collins	745	Max Carey	738
4	Willie Wilson	660	Honus Wagner	722
5	Bert Campaneris	649	Joe Morgan	681
6	Luis Aparicio	506	Vince Coleman	660
7	Paul Molitor	504	Tim Raines	635
8	Kenny Lofton	502	Dummy Hoy	567
9	Clyde Milan	495	Maury Wills	586
10	Ichiro Suzuki	487	Ozzie Smith	580

=== Single-season stolen base leaders (100 or more) ===
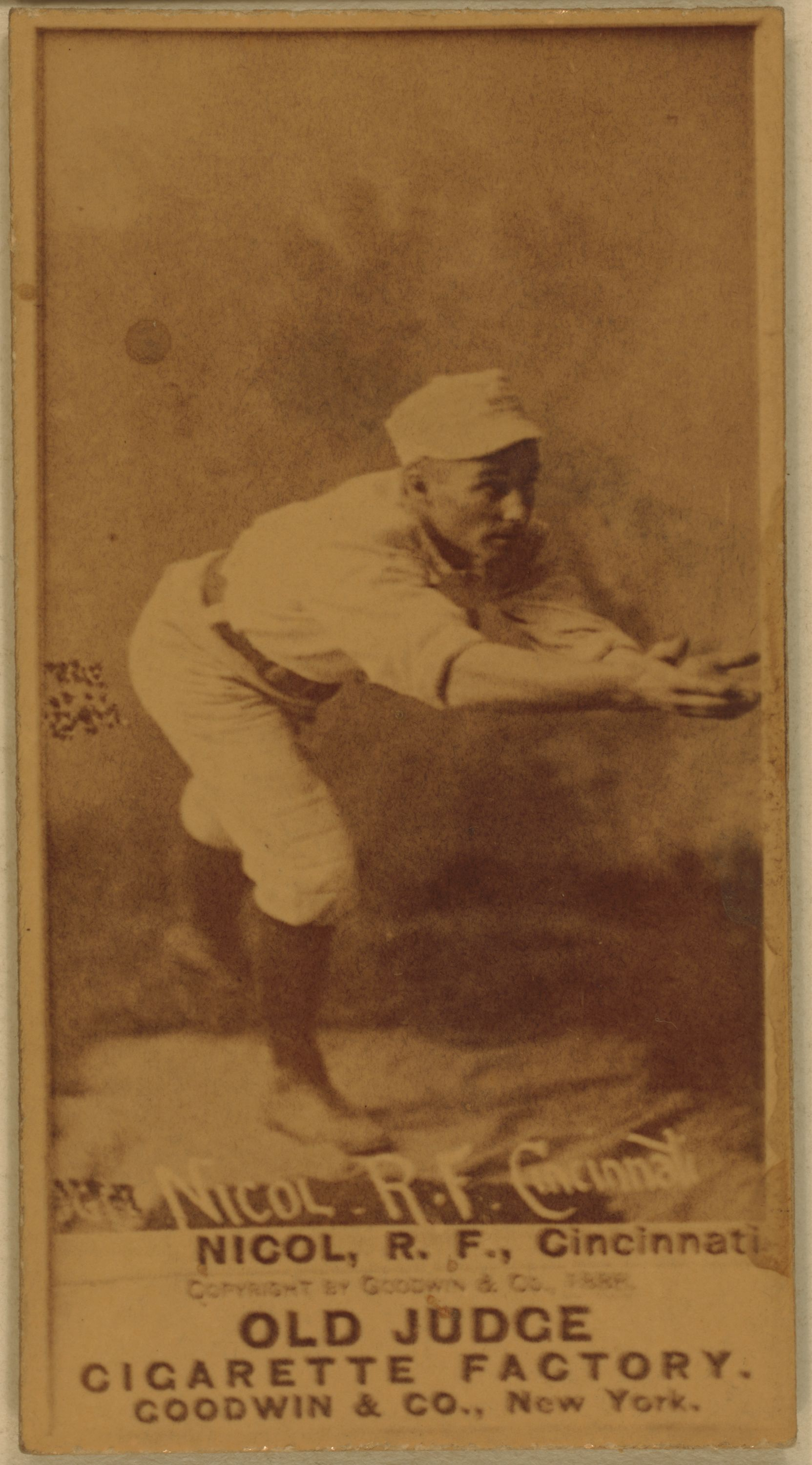
Hugh Nicol's single-season mark of 138 stolen bases in 1887 remains the major league record.

The pre-modern single-season mark for stolen bases is 138 by Hugh Nicol of the Cincinnati Red Stockings (AA) in 1887. In the modern era, Ty Cobb set a single-season mark of 96 stolen bases in 1915 that lasted until it was broken by Maury Wills with 104 in 1962. A new modern mark was set by Lou Brock with 118 in 1974, and again by Rickey Henderson with 130 in 1982. Henderson and Vince Coleman are the only players to record three 100-steal seasons in the modern era. Coleman is the only player to do it three seasons in a row, much less in the first three seasons of his career, as well as the only player to record 100 steals as a rookie.

Player	SB	Team	Season
Hugh Nicol	138	Cincinnati Red Stockings (AA)	1887
Rickey Henderson	130	Oakland Athletics	1982
Arlie Latham	129	St. Louis Cardinals (AA)	1887
Lou Brock	118	St. Louis Cardinals	1974
Charles Comiskey	117	St. Louis Cardinals (AA)	1887
John Montgomery Ward	111	New York Giants	1887
Billy Hamilton	111	Philadelphia Phillies	1891
Vince Coleman	110	St. Louis Cardinals	1985†
Arlie Latham (2)	109	St. Louis Cardinals (AA)	1888
Vince Coleman (2)	109	St. Louis Cardinals	1987
Rickey Henderson (2)	108	Oakland Athletics	1983
Vince Coleman (3)	107	St. Louis Cardinals	1986
Maury Wills	104	Los Angeles Dodgers	1962
Hugh Nicol (2)	103	Cincinnati Red Stockings (AA)	1888
Jim Fogarty	102	Philadelphia Phillies	1887
Billy Hamilton (2)	102	Philadelphia Phillies	1890
Rickey Henderson (3)	100	Oakland Athletics	1980

† denotes a player's rookie season

=== Single-game stolen base leaders (5 or more) ===
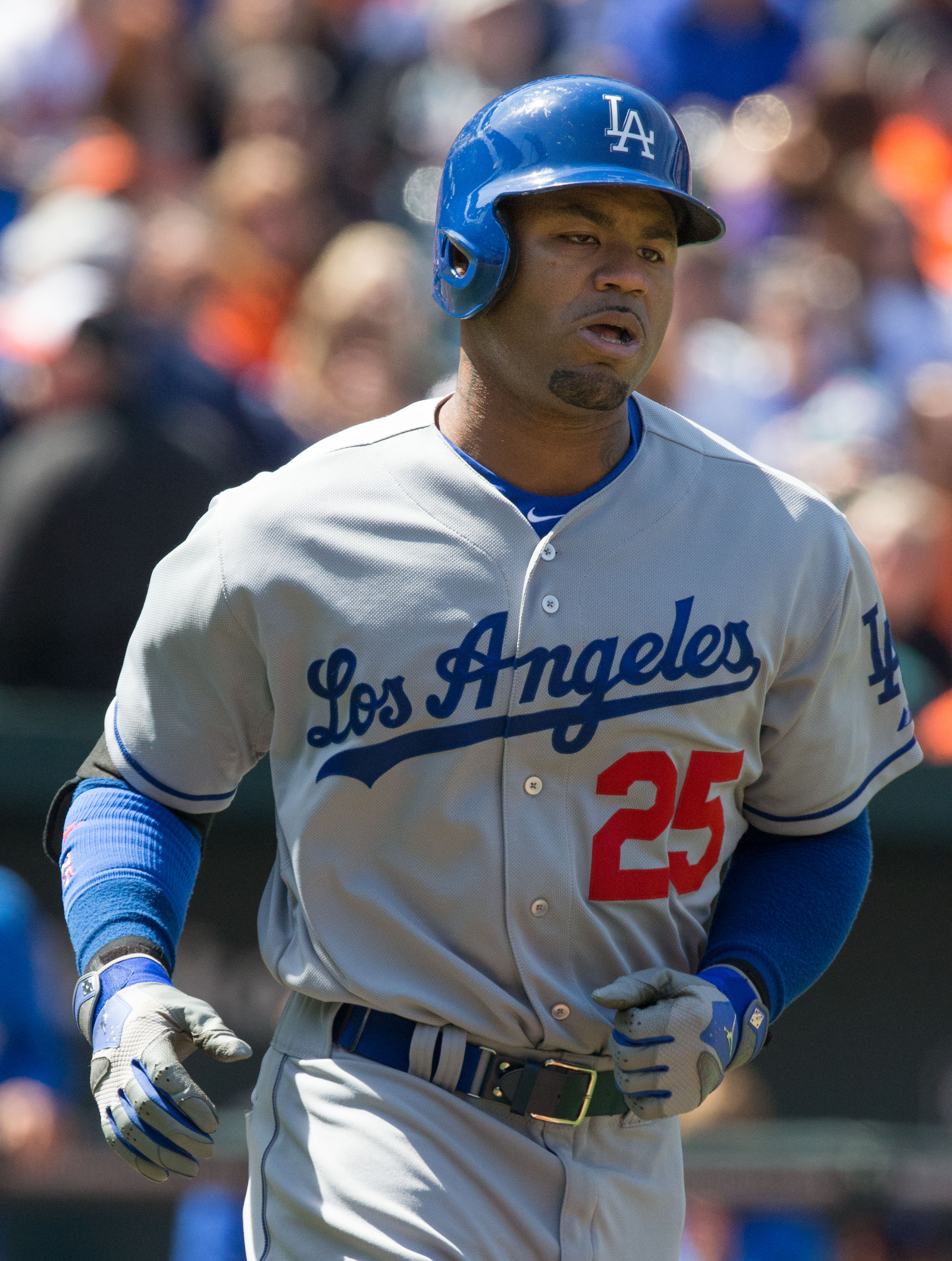
Carl Crawford is the most recent player to steal 6 bases in a game.

Under the pre-modern rule, George Gore stole 7 bases in a game in 1881, a mark that was tied by "Sliding Billy" Hamilton in 1894 (not to be confused with Billy Hamilton, the most recent addition to this leaderboard). In the modern era, on September 11, 1912, Eddie Collins stole 6 bases in a game, a mark that stood alone for nearly eight decades before being tied by Otis Nixon (1991), Eric Young (1996), and Carl Crawford (2009). On September 22, 1912, Collins stole 6 bases in a game for a second time in 11 days.

Collins, Cole, and Young are the only 3 men in MLB history to have multiple games with at least 5 stolen bases.

Player	SB	Team	Date	Opponent
George Gore	7	Chicago White Stockings	June 25, 1881	Providence Grays
Billy Hamilton	7	Philadelphia Phillies	August 31, 1894	Washington Senators
Eddie Collins	6	Philadelphia Athletics	September 11, 1912	Detroit Tigers
Eddie Collins (2)	6	Philadelphia Athletics	September 22, 1912	St. Louis Browns
Otis Nixon	6	Atlanta Braves	June 16, 1991	Montreal Expos
Eric Young	6	Colorado Rockies	June 30, 1996	Los Angeles Dodgers
Carl Crawford	6	Tampa Bay Rays	May 3, 2009	Boston Red Sox
Dan McGann	5	New York Giants	May 27, 1904	Brooklyn Superbas
Clyde Milan	5	Washington Senators	June 14, 1912	Cleveland Indians
Johnny Neun	5	Detroit Tigers	July 9, 1927 (Note: Game 2 of a doubleheader)	New York Yankees
Amos Otis	5	Kansas City Royals	September 7, 1971	Milwaukee Brewers
Davey Lopes	5	Los Angeles Dodgers	August 24, 1974	St. Louis Cardinals
Bert Campaneris	5	Oakland Athletics	May 24, 1976	Minnesota Twins
Lonnie Smith	5	St. Louis Cardinals	September 4, 1982	San Francisco Giants
Alan Wiggins	5	San Diego Padres	May 17, 1984	Montreal Expos
Tony Gwynn	5	San Diego Padres	September 20, 1986	Houston Astros
Rickey Henderson	5	Oakland Athletics	July 29, 1989	Seattle Mariners
Alex Cole	5	Cleveland Indians	August 1, 1990	Kansas City Royals
Alex Cole (2)	5	Cleveland Indians	May 3, 1992	California Angels
Damian Jackson	5	San Diego Padres	June 28, 1999	Colorado Rockies
Eric Young (2)	5	Chicago Cubs	May 14, 2000	Montreal Expos
Kenny Lofton	5	Cleveland Indians	September 3, 2000	Baltimore Orioles
Scarborough Green	5	Texas Rangers	September 28, 2000	Seattle Mariners
Ryan Freel	5	Cincinnati Reds	July 27, 2005	Los Angeles Dodgers
Willy Taveras	5	Colorado Rockies	June 14, 2008	Chicago White Sox
Dexter Fowler	5	Colorado Rockies	April 27, 2009	San Diego Padres
Jacoby Ellsbury	5	Boston Red Sox	May 30, 2013	Philadelphia Phillies
Billy Hamilton	5	Cincinnati Reds	June 14, 2015	Chicago Cubs

=== Consecutive stolen base leaders (35 or more) ===
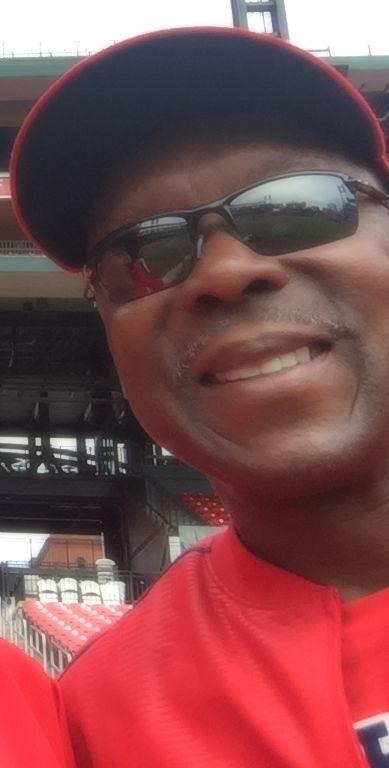
The record for consecutive steals is held by Vince Coleman, with 50.

Records for consecutive successful stolen base attempts are limited by the available data, as times caught stealing has been recorded officially only since 1920. Max Carey established a mark in 1922–23 of 37 consecutive stolen bases without being caught, which stood until it was broken by Davey Lopes with 38 consecutive steals in 1975. Lopes's record was broken by Vince Coleman with 50 consecutive stolen bases in 1988–89.

Player	SB	Team	Start	Ended
Vince Coleman	50	St. Louis Cardinals	September 16, 1988	July 26, 1989
Ichiro Suzuki	45	Seattle Mariners	April 29, 2006	May 16, 2007
Trea Turner	41	Los Angeles Dodgers/Philadelphia Phillies	August 13, 2022	April 24, 2024
Tim Raines	40	Chicago White Sox	July 23, 1993	September 1, 1995
Jimmy Rollins	39	Philadelphia Phillies	September 1, 2007	July 26, 2008
Davey Lopes	38	Los Angeles Dodgers	June 6, 1975	August 24, 1975
Shohei Ohtani	38	Los Angeles Dodgers	July 23, 2024	April 4, 2025
Max Carey	37	Pittsburgh Pirates	July 7, 1922	May 13, 1923
Tim Raines (2)	37	Montreal Expos	September 22, 1983	July 6, 1984
Stan Javier	37	Oakland Athletics; San Francisco Giants	May 31, 1995	June 27, 1996
Paul Molitor	36	Toronto Blue Jays	August 22, 1993	October 1, 1995
Brady Anderson	36	Baltimore Orioles	May 14, 1994	July 3, 1995
Coco Crisp	36	Oakland Athletics	July 16, 2011	June 19, 2012
Brice Turang	36	Milwaukee Brewers	July 15, 2023	May 27, 2024
Davey Lopes (2)	35	Oakland Athletics; Chicago Cubs	July 11, 1983	May 18, 1985
Jimmy Rollins (2)	35	Philadelphia Phillies	May 9, 2001	August 25, 2001

=== Multiple-season stolen base records ===
==== Three or more seasons with 70 stolen bases ====
Under pre-modern rules, "Sliding Billy" Hamilton amassed six separate seasons of 70-plus stolen bases over his career. In the modern era, Ty Cobb established a mark of three such seasons that stood (though tied by Lou Brock and Omar Moreno) until it was broken by Tim Raines in 1984. In 1986, Raines reached six seasons of 70-plus steals, all consecutive (a record), but Rickey Henderson notched his seventh such season in 1989.

Player	Seasons	Seasons and teams
Rickey Henderson	7	1980, 82–83 (Oakland Athletics), 1985–86, 88 (New York Yankees), 1989 (NY Yankees-Oak Athletics)
Billy Hamilton	6	1889 (Kansas City Blues (AA)), 1890–91, 94–95 (Philadelphia Phillies), 1896 (Boston Beaneaters)
Tim Raines	6	1981–86 (Montreal Expos)
Vince Coleman	5	1985–88, 90 (St. Louis Cardinals)
Tom Brown	3	1890–91 (Boston Reds (PL-AA)), 1892 (Louisville Colonels)
Harry Stovey	3	1887–88 (Philadelphia Athletics (AA)), 1890 (Boston Reds (PL))
Ty Cobb	3	1909, 11, 15 (Detroit Tigers)
Lou Brock	3	1966, 73–74 (St. Louis Cardinals)
Omar Moreno	3	1978–80 (Pittsburgh Pirates)

==== Ten or more seasons with 40 stolen bases ====
In 1924, Eddie Collins tied Billy Hamilton's pre-modern mark of ten seasons with 40-plus stolen bases. A year later, Max Carey also tied the record. The record was broken by Lou Brock in 1974. Brock eventually recorded a thirteenth 40-steal season, but was in turn surpassed by Rickey Henderson in 1993. Henderson eventually stole 40 bases in sixteen separate seasons.

Player	Seasons	Seasons and teams
Rickey Henderson	16	1980–84, 90–92, 98 (Oakland Athletics), 1985–88 (New York Yankees), 1989 (NY Yankees-Oak Athletics), 1993 (Oak Athletics-Tor Blue Jays), 1997 (SD Padres–Ana Angels)
Lou Brock	13	1964 (Chi Cubs–StL Cardinals), 1965–76 (St. Louis Cardinals)
Tim Raines	11	1981–87, 89–90 (Montreal Expos), 1991–92 (Chicago White Sox)
Billy Hamilton	10	1889 (Kansas City Blues (AA)), 1890–95 (Philadelphia Phillies), 1896–98 (Boston Beaneaters)
Eddie Collins	10	1909–10, 12–14 (Philadelphia Athletics), 1915–17, 23–24 (Chicago White Sox)
Max Carey	10	1912–13, 16–18, 20, 22–25 (Pittsburgh Pirates)

==== Eight or more consecutive seasons with 40 stolen bases ====
Player	Seasons	Seasons and teams
Rickey Henderson	14	1980–84, 90–92 (Oakland Athletics), 1985–88 (New York Yankees), 1989 (NY Yankees-Oak Athletics), 1993 (Oak Athletics-Tor Blue Jays)
Lou Brock	13	1964 (Chi Cubs–StL Cardinals), 1965–76 (St. Louis Cardinals)
Billy Hamilton	10	1889 (Kansas City Blues (AA)), 1890–95 (Philadelphia Phillies), 1896–98 (Boston Beaneaters)
Joe Morgan	9	1969–71 (Houston Astros), 1972–77 (Cincinnati Reds)
Honus Wagner	8	1901–08 (Pittsburgh Pirates)
Otis Nixon	8	1990 (Montreal Expos), 1991–93 (Atlanta Braves), 1994 (Boston Red Sox), 1995 (Texas Rangers), 1996 (Toronto Blue Jays), 1997 (Tor Blue Jays-LA Dodgers)
Juan Pierre	8	2001–02 (Colorado Rockies), 2003–05 (Florida Marlins), 2006 (Chicago Cubs), 2007–08 (Los Angeles Dodgers)

==== Fifteen or more seasons with 20 stolen bases ====
Player	Titles	Years and teams
Rickey Henderson	23	1979–84, 89–93, 94–95, 98 (Oakland Athletics), 1985–88 (New York Yankees), 1989 (NY Yankees-Oak Athletics), 1993 (Toronto Blue Jays), 1996–97, 2001 (San Diego Padres), 1997 (SD Padres-Anaheim Angels), 1999 (New York Mets), 2000 (NY Mets-Sea Mariners)
Honus Wagner	18	1898–99 (Louisville Colonels), 1900–15 (Pittsburgh Pirates)
George Davis	17	1890–92 (Cleveland Spiders), 1893–1901 (New York Giants), 1902, 1904–06, 08 (Chicago White Sox)
Ty Cobb	17	1906–19, 21, 24 (Detroit Tigers), 1927 (Philadelphia Athletics)
Lou Brock	16	1963 (Chicago Cubs), 1964 (Chi Cubs-Stl Cardinals), 1965–77, 79 (St. Louis Cardinals)
Ozzie Smith	16	1978–81 (San Diego Padres), 1982–93 (St. Louis Cardinals)
Eddie Collins	15	1909–14 (Philadelphia Athletics), 1915–20, 22–24 (Chicago White Sox)
Max Carey	15	1911–18, 20–25 (Pittsburgh Pirates), 1927 (Brooklyn Robins)
Willie Wilson	15	1978–90 (Kansas City Royals), 1991–92 (Oakland Athletics)

=== League-leader stolen base records ===
==== League leader in stolen bases, 5 or more seasons ====
Player	Titles	Years and teams
Rickey Henderson	12	1980–84, 90–91, 98 (Oakland Athletics), 1985–86, 88 (New York Yankees), 1989 (NY Yankees-Oak Athletics)
Max Carey	10	1913, 15–18, 20, 22–25 (Pittsburgh Pirates)
Luis Aparicio	9	1956–62 (Chicago White Sox), 1963–64 (Baltimore Orioles)
Lou Brock	8	1966–69, 71–74 (St. Louis Cardinals)
Ty Cobb	6	1907, 09, 11, 15–17 (Detroit Tigers)
George Case	6	1939–43, 46 (Washington Senators)
Maury Wills	6	1960–65 (Los Angeles Dodgers)
Bert Campaneris	6	1965–68, 70, 72 (Oakland Athletics)
Vince Coleman	6	1985–90 (St. Louis Cardinals)
Billy Hamilton	5	1889 (Kansas City Blues (AA)), 1890–91, 94–95 (Philadelphia Phillies)
Honus Wagner	5	1901–02, 04, 07–08 (Pittsburgh Pirates)
Kenny Lofton	5	1992–96 (Cleveland Indians)

==== League leader in stolen bases, 4 or more consecutive seasons ====
Player	Titles	Years and teams
Luis Aparicio	9	1956–62 (Chicago White Sox), 1963–64 (Baltimore Orioles)
Rickey Henderson	7	1980–84 (Oakland Athletics), 1985–86 (New York Yankees)
Maury Wills	6	1960–65 (Los Angeles Dodgers)
Vince Coleman	6	1985–90 (St. Louis Cardinals)
George Case	5	1939–43 (Washington Senators)
Kenny Lofton	5	1992–96 (Cleveland Indians)
Bob Bescher	4	1909–12 (Cincinnati Reds)
Max Carey	4	1915–18 (Pittsburgh Pirates)
Max Carey	4	1922–25 (Pittsburgh Pirates)
Willie Mays	4	1956–59 (New York/San Francisco Giants)
Bert Campaneris	4	1965–68 (KC-Oak Athletics)
Lou Brock	4	1966–69 (St. Louis Cardinals)
Lou Brock	4	1971–74 (St. Louis Cardinals)
Tim Raines	4	1981–84 (Montreal Expos)
Rickey Henderson	4	1988 (New York Yankees), 1989 (NY Yankees-Oak Athletics), 1990–91 (Oakland Athletics)

==== League leader in stolen bases, two leagues ====
Player	League, team and year
Harry Stovey	AA: Philadelphia Athletics (1886), PL: Boston Reds (1890)
Tom Brown	AA: Boston Reds (1891), NL: Louisville Colonels (1893)
Billy Hamilton	AA: Kansas City Blues (AA) (1889), NL: Philadelphia Phillies (1890–91, 94–95)
Ron LeFlore	AL: Detroit Tigers (1978), NL: Montreal Expos (1980)
Juan Pierre	NL: Colorado Rockies (2001), Florida Marlins (2003), AL: Chicago White Sox (2010)

==== League leader in stolen bases, three different teams ====
Player	Teams and year
Juan Pierre	Colorado Rockies (2001), Florida Marlins (2003), Chicago White Sox (2010)

=== Stolen base percentage leaders ===
==== Career leaders (80% or more, 400+ attempts) ====
Those marked in bold have at least 600 career stolen base attempts. Of those, Joe Morgan (in 1984) was the first to retire with a career stolen base percentage of at least 80%. His mark was successively surpassed by Davey Lopes (retired 1987), Willie Wilson (retired 1994), Tim Raines (retired 2002), and Ichiro Suzuki (retired 2019).

Player	SB	Attempts	SB%
**Tim Raines**	**808**	**954**	**84.70%**
Eric Davis	349	415	84.10%
**Willie Wilson**	**668**	**802**	**83.29%**
Barry Larkin	379	456	83.11%
Tony Womack	363	437	83.07%
**Davey Lopes**	**557**	**671**	**83.01%**
Jacoby Ellsbury	343	414	82.85%
Jimmy Rollins	470	575	81.73%
Carl Crawford	480	589	81.49%
Julio Cruz	343	421	81.47%
**Ichiro Suzuki**	**509**	**626**	**81.31%**
Alex Rodriguez	329	405	81.24%
**Joe Morgan**	**689**	**851**	**80.96%**
**Vince Coleman**	**752**	**929**	**80.95%**
**Rickey Henderson**	**1406**	**1741**	**80.76%**
Roberto Alomar	474	588	80.61%
**José Reyes**	**513**	**639**	**80.28%**

==== Single-season leaders (95% or more, 30+ steals) ====
Player	SB%	SB	Attempts	Team	Season
Trea Turner	100%	30	30	Philadelphia Phillies	2023
Brady Anderson	96.9%	31	32	Baltimore Orioles	1994
Carlos Beltrán	96.9%	31	32	Kansas City Royals	2001
Trevor Story	96.9%	31	32	Boston Red Sox	2025
Max Carey	96.2%	51	53	Pittsburgh Pirates	1922
Ichiro Suzuki	95.74%	45	47	Seattle Mariners	2006

Note: includes all statistics from both leagues for players traded during a season. (Note: The Major League Baseball (MLB) reference for this statistic lists Carlos Beltrán as having a 100% stolen base percentage in 2004. However, examination of the statistics shows that Beltrán was 28/28 in stolen bases with the Houston Astros, but went 14/17 after being traded from the Kansas City Royals mid-season. While 28/28 is the National League leader for that season, the combined 42/45 (93.3%) does not make Beltrán eligible for this list. Similarly, Dave Roberts is listed by MLB as having a 97.1% stolen base percentage in 2004. Roberts was 33/34 in stolen bases with the Los Angeles Dodgers before being traded mid-season to the Boston Red Sox where he was 5/7 in stolen bases. Roberts' combined 38/41 (92.7%) does not make him eligible for this list.)

== Team records ==
Tables in this section indicate which MLB-recognized league each team played in.

=== Most stolen bases by a team in one season, by league ===
League (abbr.)	Operated	SB	Team	Season	Ref.
American Association (AA)	1882–1891	581	St. Louis Browns	1887	
Players' League (PL)	1890	426	Boston Reds	1890	
National League (NL)	1876–present	415	New York Giants	1887	
American League (AL)	1901–present	341	Oakland Athletics	1976	
Federal League (FL)	1914–1915	273	Indianapolis Hoosiers	1914	
Union Association (UA)	1884	Stolen base records not kept			

While not recognized as a major league by MLB, the National Association (NA) operated from 1871 through 1875, with the 1873 Boston Red Stockings amassing the most stolen bases in a single season, 145.

=== Most stolen bases by a team in one season (450 or more) ===
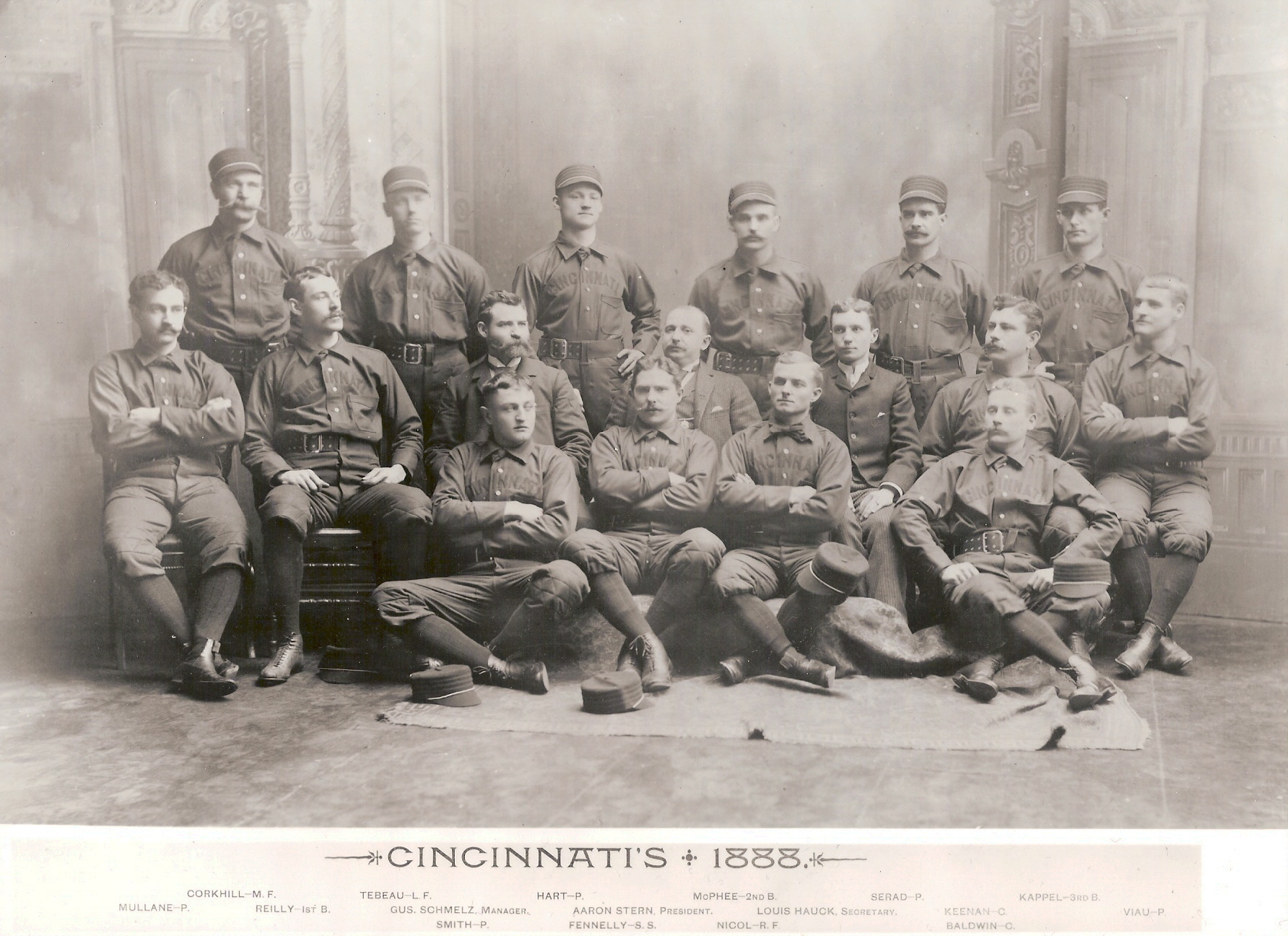
The 1888 Cincinnati Red Stockings team stole 469 bases.

Records in this category are dominated by teams of the American Association, which operated from 1882 to 1891, and whose records are recognized by Major League Baseball. In particular, the top four entries in the below table are from the league's 1887 season, when every team in league had at least 305 stolen bases and the league average was 458 (each team played between 133 and 141 games).

SB	Team	Season
581	St. Louis Browns (AA)	1887
545	Baltimore Orioles (AA)	1887
527	Cincinnati Red Stockings (AA)	1887
476	Philadelphia Athletics (AA)	1887
472	Kansas City Cowboys (AA)	1889
469	Cincinnati Red Stockings (AA)	1888
468	St. Louis Browns (AA)	1888
466	Louisville Colonels (AA)	1887
462	Cincinnati Red Stockings (AA)	1889

=== Most stolen bases by a team in one season, 1901–present (300 or more) ===
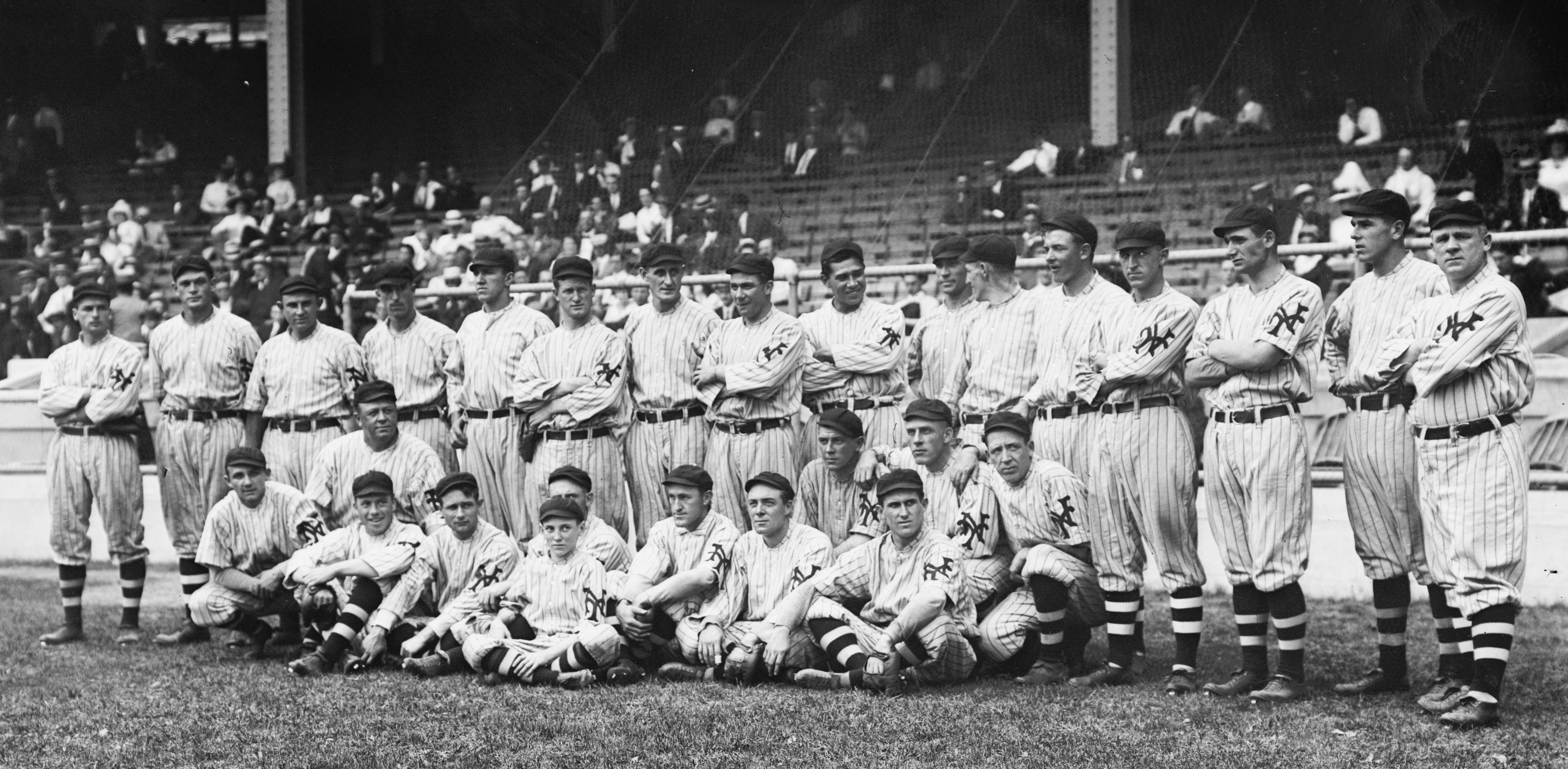
The 1912 New York Giants stole 319 bases.

The below table is restricted to teams that have competed since 1901, the first season of play for the American League.

SB	Team	Season
347	New York Giants (NL)	1911
341	Oakland Athletics (AL)	1976
319	New York Giants (NL)	1912
314	St. Louis Cardinals (NL)	1985
310	Cincinnati Reds (NL)	1910

=== Fewest stolen bases by a team in one season (less than 20) ===
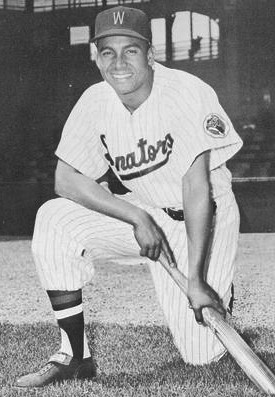
Julio Bécquer led the 1957 Washington Senators in stolen bases, with three.

Note: this table excludes teams from the shortened 2020 season.

SB	Team	Season
13	Washington Senators (AL)	1957
16	Kansas City Athletics (AL)	1960
17	Detroit Tigers (AL)	1972
17	St. Louis Browns (AL)	1953
17	St. Louis Cardinals (NL)	1949
18	Boston Red Sox (AL)	1964
18	St. Louis Cardinals (NL)	1953
19	Baltimore Orioles (AL)	2016
19	Chicago White Sox (AL)	1950
19	Cleveland Indians (AL)	1945
19	Cincinnati Reds (NL)	1938
19	New York Giants (NL)	1934

== See also ==
- 30–30 club – players who have hit 30 home runs and stolen 30 bases in the same season
- Lists of Major League Baseball stolen base leaders which includes
  - List of Major League Baseball annual stolen base leaders
  - List of Major League Baseball career stolen bases leaders
