= 1887 New York Metropolitans season =

1887 New York Metropolitans
- League: American Association
- Ballpark: St. George Cricket Grounds
- City: New York City
- Record: 44–89 (.331)
- League place: 7th
- Owner: Erastus Wiman
- Managers: Bob Ferguson, Dave Orr, O. P. Caylor

The 1887 New York Metropolitans finished with a 44–89 record, seventh place in the American Association. The team folded operations at the conclusion of the season. What was left of the team was purchased by the Brooklyn Grays, who were interested in several of the Metropolitans' players. The Kansas City Cowboys inherited the Metropolitans' place in the American Association for the 1888 season.

== Regular season ==
=== Season standings ===
American Association
Team	W	L	Pct.	GB	Home	Road
St. Louis Browns	95	40	.704	—	58‍–‍15	37‍–‍25
Cincinnati Red Stockings	81	54	.600	14	46‍–‍27	35‍–‍27
Baltimore Orioles	77	58	.570	18	42‍–‍21	35‍–‍37
Louisville Colonels	76	60	.559	19½	45‍–‍23	31‍–‍37
Philadelphia Athletics	64	69	.481	30	41‍–‍28	23‍–‍41
Brooklyn Grays	60	74	.448	34½	36‍–‍37	24‍–‍37
New York Metropolitans	44	89	.331	50	26‍–‍33	18‍–‍56
Cleveland Blues	39	92	.298	54	22‍–‍36	17‍–‍56

=== Record vs. opponents ===
1887 American Association record Sources:
Team	BAL	BRO	CIN	CLE	LOU	NYM	PHA	STL
Baltimore	—	10–9–1	11–9	17–3	7–11–1	15–4–2	14–6	3–16–2
Brooklyn	9–10–1	—	7–13	13–6–1	8–12	9–9	10–8–2	4–16
Cincinnati	9–11	13–7	—	11–6	8–12	17–3–1	11–9	12–6
Cleveland	3–17	6–13–1	6–11	—	8–11–1	11–8	4–14	1–18
Louisville	11–7–1	12–8	12–8	11–8–1	—	12–8	11–8–1	7–13
New York	4–15–2	9–9	3–17–1	8–11	8–12	—	7–11–1	5–14–1
Philadelphia	6–14	8–10–2	9–11	14–4	8–11–1	11–7–1	—	8–12
St. Louis	16–3–2	16–4	6–12	18–1	13–7	14–5–1	12–8	—

=== Roster ===
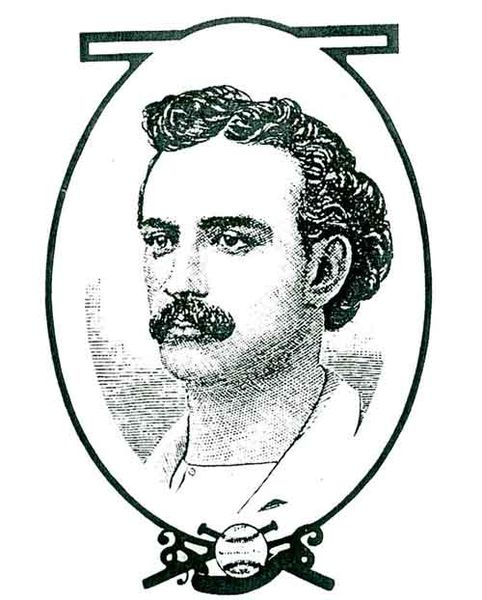
Lip Pike

1887 New York Metropolitans
Roster
Pitchers: Ed Cushman; Bill Fagan; Jack Lynch; Al Mays; James McMullin; Charlie Parsons; John Shaffer; Stump Weidman	Catchers: Bill Collins; Jim Donahue; Bill Holbert; Tom Kinslow; Andy Sommers; Infielders: Clarence Cross; Dude Esterbrook; Joe Gerhardt; Frank Hankinson; Sadie Houck; Jimmy Knowles; Tom O'Brien; Dave Orr; Paul Radford; Cyclone Ryan	Outfielders: Charlie Hall; Mortimer Hogan; Charley Jones; John Meister; Jon Morrison; Candy Nelson; Darby O'Brien; Fred O'Neill; Lip Pike; Chief Roseman	Manager: O. P. Caylor; Bob Ferguson; Dave Orr

== Player stats ==
=== Batting ===
==== Starters by position ====
Note: Pos = Position; G = Games played; AB = At bats; H = Hits; Avg. = Batting average; HR = Home runs; RBI = Runs batted in

Pos	Player	G	AB	H	Avg.	HR	RBI
C	Bill Holbert	69	255	58	.227	0	32
1B	Dave Orr	84	345	127	.368	2	66
2B	Joe Gerhardt	85	307	68	.221	0	27
SS	Paul Radford	128	486	129	.265	4	45
3B	Frank Hankinson	127	512	137	.268	1	71
OF	Darby O'Brien	127	522	157	.301	5	73
OF	Charley Jones	62	247	63	.255	3	29
OF	Chief Roseman	60	241	55	.228	1	27

==== Other batters ====
Note: G = Games played; AB = At bats; H = Hits; Avg. = Batting average; HR = Home runs; RBI = Runs batted in

Player	G	AB	H	Avg.	HR	RBI
Candy Nelson	68	257	63	.245	0	24
Jim Donahue	60	220	62	.282	1	29
John Meister	39	158	35	.222	1	21
Tom O'Brien	31	129	25	.194	0	18
Mortimer Hogan	32	120	24	.200	0	5
Andy Sommers	33	116	21	.181	1	12
Dude Esterbrook	26	101	17	.168	0	7
Jimmy Knowles	16	60	15	.250	0	6
Clarence Cross	16	55	11	.200	0	5
Jon Morrison	9	34	4	.118	0	3
Sadie Houck	10	33	5	.152	0	0
Cyclone Ryan	8	32	7	.219	0	3
Fred O'Neill	6	26	8	.308	0	3
Charlie Hall	3	12	1	.083	0	0
Tom Kinslow	2	6	0	.000	0	0
Bill Collins	1	4	1	.250	0	0
Lip Pike	1	4	0	.000	0	0

=== Pitching ===
==== Starting pitchers ====
Note: G = Games pitched; IP = Innings pitched; W = Wins; L = Losses; ERA = Earned run average; SO = Strikeouts

Player	G	IP	W	L	ERA	SO
Al Mays	52	441.1	17	34	4.73	124
Ed Cushman	26	220.0	10	15	5.97	64
Jack Lynch	21	187.0	7	14	5.10	45
John Shaffer	13	112.0	2	11	6.19	22
Stump Weidman	12	97.0	4	8	4.64	37
Bill Fagan	6	45.0	1	4	4.00	12
Charlie Parsons	4	34.0	1	1	4.50	5
James McMullin	3	21.0	2	1	7.71	2

==== Other pitchers ====
Note: G = Games pitched; IP = Innings pitched; W = Wins; L = Losses; ERA = Earned run average; SO = Strikeouts

Player	G	IP	W	L	ERA	SO
Cyclone Ryan	2	2.1	0	1	23.14	0

==== Relief pitchers ====
Note: G = Games pitched; W = Wins; L = Losses; SV = Saves; ERA = Earned run average; SO = Strikeouts

Player	G	W	L	SV	ERA	SO
Chief Roseman	2	0	0	0	7.88	1
Paul Radford	2	0	0	0	18.00	4
Charley Jones	2	0	0	0	3.00	0
Tom O'Brien	1	0	0	0	7.36	0
Darby O'Brien	1	0	0	0	0.00	0
