= 1887 Cleveland Blues season =

1887 Cleveland Blues
- League: American Association
- Ballpark: National League Park
- City: Cleveland, Ohio
- Record: 39–92 (.298)
- League place: 8th
- Owner: Frank Robison
- Manager: Jimmy Williams

The 1887 Cleveland Blues baseball team finished with a 39–92 record, last in the American Association during their debut season. Organized by streetcar tycoon Frank Robison, the team played its home games at National League Park.

== Regular season ==
=== Season standings ===
American Association
| Team | W | L | Pct. | GB | Home | Road |
|---|---|---|---|---|---|---|
| St. Louis Browns | 95 | 40 | .704 | — | 58‍–‍15 | 37‍–‍25 |
| Cincinnati Red Stockings | 81 | 54 | .600 | 14 | 46‍–‍27 | 35‍–‍27 |
| Baltimore Orioles | 77 | 58 | .570 | 18 | 42‍–‍21 | 35‍–‍37 |
| Louisville Colonels | 76 | 60 | .559 | 19½ | 45‍–‍23 | 31‍–‍37 |
| Philadelphia Athletics | 64 | 69 | .481 | 30 | 41‍–‍28 | 23‍–‍41 |
| Brooklyn Grays | 60 | 74 | .448 | 34½ | 36‍–‍37 | 24‍–‍37 |
| New York Metropolitans | 44 | 89 | .331 | 50 | 26‍–‍33 | 18‍–‍56 |
| Cleveland Blues | 39 | 92 | .298 | 54 | 22‍–‍36 | 17‍–‍56 |

=== Record vs. opponents ===
1887 American Association record Sources:
| Team | BAL | BRO | CIN | CLE | LOU | NYM | PHA | STL |
|---|---|---|---|---|---|---|---|---|
| Baltimore | — | 10–9–1 | 11–9 | 17–3 | 7–11–1 | 15–4–2 | 14–6 | 3–16–2 |
| Brooklyn | 9–10–1 | — | 7–13 | 13–6–1 | 8–12 | 9–9 | 10–8–2 | 4–16 |
| Cincinnati | 9–11 | 13–7 | — | 11–6 | 8–12 | 17–3–1 | 11–9 | 12–6 |
| Cleveland | 3–17 | 6–13–1 | 6–11 | — | 8–11–1 | 11–8 | 4–14 | 1–18 |
| Louisville | 11–7–1 | 12–8 | 12–8 | 11–8–1 | — | 12–8 | 11–8–1 | 7–13 |
| New York | 4–15–2 | 9–9 | 3–17–1 | 8–11 | 8–12 | — | 7–11–1 | 5–14–1 |
| Philadelphia | 6–14 | 8–10–2 | 9–11 | 14–4 | 8–11–1 | 11–7–1 | — | 8–12 |
| St. Louis | 16–3–2 | 16–4 | 6–12 | 18–1 | 13–7 | 14–5–1 | 12–8 | — |

=== Roster ===
1887 Cleveland Blues
Roster
| Pitchers: Billy Crowell; Hugh Daily; Bob Gilks; John Kirby; Mike Morrison; George Pechiney; Catchers: Charlie Reipschlager; Pop Snyder; Chief Zimmer | Infielders: Ed Flynn; Joseph Herr; John McGlone; Ed McKean; Phil Reccius; Jimmy Say; Frank Scheibeck; Cub Stricker; Charlie Sweeney; Jim Toy | Outfielders: Myron Allen; Scrappy Carroll; Pete Hotaling; Fred Mann; John Munyan; Hank Simon | Manager: Jimmy Williams |

== Player stats ==
=== Batting ===
==== Starters by position ====
Note: Pos = Position; G = Games played; AB = At bats; H = Hits; Avg. = Batting average; HR = Home runs; RBI = Runs batted in

| Pos | Player | G | AB | H | Avg. | HR | RBI |
|---|---|---|---|---|---|---|---|
| C | Pop Snyder | 74 | 282 | 72 | .255 | 0 | 27 |
| 1B | Jim Toy | 109 | 423 | 94 | .222 | 1 | 56 |
| 2B | Cub Stricker | 131 | 534 | 141 | .264 | 2 | 53 |
| SS | Ed McKean | 132 | 539 | 154 | .286 | 2 | 54 |
| 3B | Phil Reccius | 62 | 229 | 47 | .205 | 0 | 29 |
| OF | Pete Hotaling | 126 | 505 | 151 | .299 | 3 | 94 |
| OF | Fred Mann | 64 | 259 | 80 | .309 | 2 | 41 |
| OF | Myron Allen | 117 | 463 | 128 | .276 | 4 | 77 |

==== Other batters ====
Note: G = Games played; AB = At bats; H = Hits; Avg. = Batting average; HR = Home runs; RBI = Runs batted in

| Player | G | AB | H | Avg. | HR | RBI |
|---|---|---|---|---|---|---|
| Charlie Reipschlager | 63 | 231 | 49 | .212 | 0 | 17 |
| Scrappy Carroll | 57 | 216 | 43 | .199 | 0 | 19 |
| Charlie Sweeney | 36 | 133 | 30 | .226 | 0 | 19 |
| John McGlone | 21 | 79 | 20 | .253 | 0 | 10 |
| Jimmy Say | 16 | 64 | 24 | .375 | 0 | 12 |
| John Munyan | 16 | 58 | 14 | .241 | 0 | 6 |
| Chief Zimmer | 14 | 52 | 12 | .231 | 0 | 4 |
| Joseph Herr | 11 | 44 | 12 | .273 | 0 | 6 |
| Ed Flynn | 7 | 27 | 5 | .185 | 0 | 4 |
| Hank Simon | 3 | 10 | 1 | .100 | 0 | 0 |
| Frank Scheibeck | 3 | 9 | 2 | .222 | 0 | 0 |

=== Pitching ===
==== Starting pitchers ====
Note: G = Games pitched; IP = Innings pitched; W = Wins; L = Losses; ERA = Earned run average; SO = Strikeouts

| Player | G | IP | W | L | ERA | SO |
|---|---|---|---|---|---|---|
| Billy Crowell | 45 | 389.1 | 14 | 31 | 3.88 | 72 |
| Mike Morrison | 40 | 316.2 | 12 | 25 | 4.92 | 158 |
| Hugh Daily | 16 | 139.2 | 4 | 12 | 3.69 | 30 |
| Bob Gilks | 13 | 108.0 | 7 | 5 | 3.08 | 28 |
| George Pechiney | 10 | 86.0 | 1 | 9 | 7.12 | 24 |
| John Kirby | 5 | 41.0 | 0 | 5 | 9.00 | 6 |
| Charlie Sweeney | 3 | 24.0 | 0 | 3 | 8.25 | 8 |
| Frank Scheibeck | 1 | 9.0 | 0 | 1 | 12.00 | 3 |

==== Relief pitchers ====
Note: G = Games pitched; W = Wins; L = Losses; SV = Saves; ERA = Earned run average; SO = Strikeouts

| Player | G | W | L | SV | ERA | SO |
|---|---|---|---|---|---|---|
| Cub Stricker | 3 | 0 | 0 | 1 | 3.18 | 2 |
| Myron Allen | 2 | 1 | 0 | 0 | 0.93 | 1 |
| Phil Reccius | 1 | 0 | 0 | 0 | 7.71 | 0 |
