= 1887 in baseball =

The following are the baseball events of the year 1887 throughout the world.

== Champions ==
=== Major League Baseball ===
- National League: Detroit Wolverines
- American Association: St. Louis Browns

World Series

Detroit defeated St. Louis, ten games to five.

=== Minor League Baseball ===
- California League: San Francisco Pioneers
- Eastern League: Waterbury
- International League: Toronto
- New England League: Lowell
- Northwestern League: Oshkosh
- Southern League: New Orleans
- Western League: Topeka

=== College baseball ===
- American College Association: Dartmouth College
- Eastern College League: Yale University
- Inter-Collegiate Association: Michigan Agriculture College
- New York State Inter-Collegiate Base Ball League: Hobart College

== Statistical leaders ==
| | American Association | | National League | |
| Stat | Player | Total | Player | Total |
|---|---|---|---|---|
| AVG | Tip O'Neill^{1} (STL) | .435 | Sam Thompson (DET) | .372 |
| HR | Tip O'Neill^{1} (STL) | 14 | Billy O'Brien (WAS) | 19 |
| RBI | Tip O'Neill^{1} (STL) | 123 | Sam Thompson (DET) | 166 |
| W | Matt Kilroy (BAL) | 46 | John Clarkson (CHI) | 42 |
| ERA | Mike Smith (CIN) | 2.94 | Dan Casey (PHI) | 2.86 |
| K | Toad Ramsey (LOU) | 355 | John Clarkson (CHI) | 237 |

^{1} American Association Triple Crown batting winner

== Major league baseball final standings ==
=== American Association final standings ===
American Association
| Team | W | L | Pct. | GB | Home | Road |
|---|---|---|---|---|---|---|
| St. Louis Browns | 95 | 40 | .704 | — | 58‍–‍15 | 37‍–‍25 |
| Cincinnati Red Stockings | 81 | 54 | .600 | 14 | 46‍–‍27 | 35‍–‍27 |
| Baltimore Orioles | 77 | 58 | .570 | 18 | 42‍–‍21 | 35‍–‍37 |
| Louisville Colonels | 76 | 60 | .559 | 19½ | 45‍–‍23 | 31‍–‍37 |
| Philadelphia Athletics | 64 | 69 | .481 | 30 | 41‍–‍28 | 23‍–‍41 |
| Brooklyn Grays | 60 | 74 | .448 | 34½ | 36‍–‍37 | 24‍–‍37 |
| New York Metropolitans | 44 | 89 | .331 | 50 | 26‍–‍33 | 18‍–‍56 |
| Cleveland Blues | 39 | 92 | .298 | 54 | 22‍–‍36 | 17‍–‍56 |

Locations of teams for the 1887 American Association season
American Association

=== National League final standings ===
National League
| Team | W | L | Pct. | GB | Home | Road |
|---|---|---|---|---|---|---|
| Detroit Wolverines | 79 | 45 | .637 | — | 44‍–‍17 | 35‍–‍28 |
| Philadelphia Quakers | 75 | 48 | .610 | 3½ | 38‍–‍23 | 37‍–‍25 |
| Chicago White Stockings | 71 | 50 | .587 | 6½ | 44‍–‍18 | 27‍–‍32 |
| New York Giants | 68 | 55 | .553 | 10½ | 36‍–‍26 | 32‍–‍29 |
| Boston Beaneaters | 61 | 60 | .504 | 16½ | 38‍–‍22 | 23‍–‍38 |
| Pittsburgh Alleghenys | 55 | 69 | .444 | 24 | 31‍–‍33 | 24‍–‍36 |
| Washington Nationals | 46 | 76 | .377 | 32 | 26‍–‍33 | 20‍–‍43 |
| Indianapolis Hoosiers | 37 | 89 | .294 | 43 | 24‍–‍39 | 13‍–‍50 |

Locations of teams for the 1887 National League season
National League

== Notable seasons ==
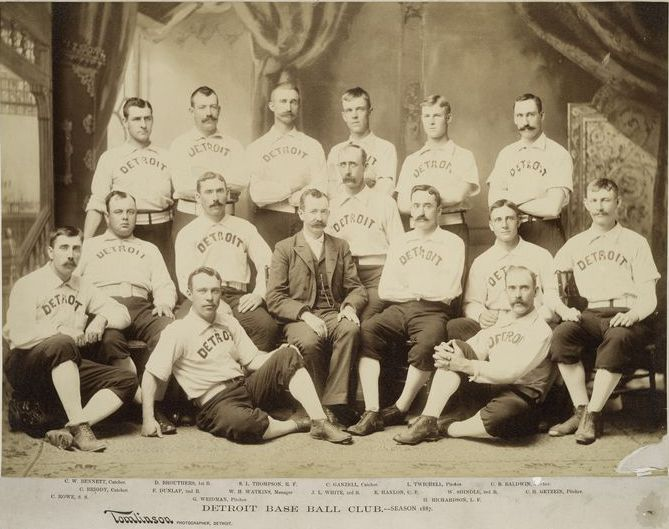
1887 Detroit Wolverines

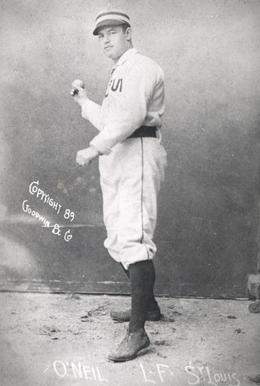
Tip O'Neill

- St. Louis Browns left fielder Tip O'Neill led the AA in batting average (.435), on-base percentage (.490), slugging percentage (.691), adjusted OPS+ (213), hits (225), home runs (14), total bases (357), runs scored (167), and runs batted in (123).
- Baltimore Orioles pitcher Matt Kilroy had a win–loss record of 46–19 and led the AA in innings pitched (589.1), wins (46), and shutouts (6). He was second in the AA in earned run average (3.07) and strikeouts (217). He was fourth in the AA in adjusted ERA+ (133).

== Events ==
=== January–March ===
- January 18 – The Kansas City Cowboys are admitted to the Western League. Though this incarnation of the franchise folds after one season, three other teams based in Kansas City would also use the Cowboys moniker, the last appearing in the Union Association in 1889.
- February 8
  - Albert Spalding of the Chicago White Stockings meets with star player Mike "King" Kelly for contract talks. Kelly wants his $375 bonus for good behavior during the 1886 season. Spalding not only refuses the bonus, but also refuses to refund $225 in fines levied against Kelly for drinking. Spalding has already sold all 3 starting outfielders from the defending champion White Stockings and is aggressively looking to rid his team of drinkers.
  - The St. Louis Maroons are sold to a group in Indianapolis for $12,000. The team will play the 1887 season as the Indianapolis Hoosiers.
- February 9 – In order to make room for the Pittsburgh Alleghenys and keep the league structure at 8 teams, the National League buys out the Kansas City Cowboys for $6,000.
- February 14 – James Billings, an owner of the Boston Beaneaters, reaches a contract agreement with Mike "King" Kelly that will pay him $2,000 per season as well as a $3,000 bonus if the Beaneaters can purchase his reserve rights from the Chicago White Stockings.
- February 16 – Mike "King" Kelly is sold to the Boston Beaneaters for $10,000, more than double the price ever paid for any player. Kelly becomes commonly known during that time as "$10,000 Kelly" because of the sale.
- February 20 – John Montgomery Ward, president of The Brotherhood of Professional Baseball Players speaks out against the increasing pattern of player-selling. The Brotherhood will later start the rival Players' League in 1890.

=== April–June ===
- April 17 – Chris von der Ahe of the St. Louis Browns purchases 19-year-old Silver King from the National League, who hold the rights to all of the 1886 Kansas City Cowboy players after the NL bought out the franchise. King will go on to win 111 games in the next 3 seasons for the Browns, leading them to 2 American Association pennants.
- April 20 – Albert Spalding of the Chicago White Stockings completes his purge of players who drink by trading holdout pitcher Jim McCormick to the Pittsburgh Alleghenys for rookie George Van Haltren and $2,000 cash.
- April 22 – Tony Mullane of the Cincinnati Red Stockings pitches his first game in the state of Missouri since 1883 after resolving the injunction he had been under for nearly 4 years. Mullane beats the St. Louis Browns 5–2.
- April 30 – Tip O'Neill of the St. Louis Browns hits for the cycle in a 28–11 drubbing of the Cleveland Blues.
- May 2 – Fred Carroll of the Pittsburgh Alleghenys hits for the cycle in an 8–3 win over the Detroit Wolverines.
- May 6 – The National Colored Base Ball League begins with the New York Gorhams beating the Pittsburgh Keystones by a score of 11–8. The league would fold on May 23 after having played only 13 official league games.
- May 7 – Tip O'Neill of the St. Louis Browns hits for the cycle for the 2nd time in 5 games. The Browns beat the Louisville Colonels, 12–7.
- May 9 – Ed Morris of the Pittsburgh Alleghenys refuses to pitch his scheduled start and is suspended by the club for 3 weeks.
- May 14 – John Roach of the New York Giants switch-pitches in a 17–2 loss to the Philadelphia Quakers in his only major league appearance.
- May 23 – The National Colored Base Ball League or the League of Colored Baseball Clubs, the first attempt to have a league consisting of all-black teams, folds after two weeks in operation.
- May 24 – Jerry Denny of the Indianapolis Hoosiers gives Mike "King" Kelly a dose of his own medicine when he prevents Kelly from scoring by grabbing his belt and holding him at third base as Kelly attempts to tag up on a fly ball. The umpire, who was watching the flight of the ball, didn't see Denny's action. Kelly was well known in baseball for bending the rules to his advantage when the umpire was not looking.
- May 28 – Pitcher Tony Mullane, suspended by the Cincinnati Red Stockings, sues the team for lost pay. Mullane and the Reds will eventually settle the suit out of court and Mullane will return to the team in mid-June.
- May 30 – New York Giants pitcher Bill George sets a major league record by walking 16 batters in a 12–11 loss to the Chicago White Stockings.
- June 4 – During the pre-game warm up, Joe Hornung places a bat on home plate and challenges pitcher Charlie Ferguson to hit it, which Ferguson promptly does on his first attempt.
- June 9 – New York Metropolitans outfielder Candy Nelson sets a record by starting 3 double plays in one game.
- June 16 – Curt Welch of the St. Louis Browns is arrested for assault in Baltimore after breaking up a double play against the Orioles. Welch will be fined $4.50 in court the next day.
- June 27 – Rookie pitcher George Van Haltren makes his major league debut for the Chicago White Stockings and ties a major league record by issuing 16 walks in a losing cause. Van Haltren will soon move to the outfield and amass over 2500 hits in a 17-year career.

=== July–September ===
- July 1 – The Philadelphia Quakers and the Detroit Wolverines set a record by scoring in 15 of the 18 half-innings in the Wolverines 17–13 victory.
- July 6 – Alex McKinnon of the Pittsburgh Alleghenys leaves the team after contracting what is believed to be typhoid fever. McKinnon died on July 24.
- July 10 – Enforcing a new law, St. Louis police stop the game and arrest Browns owner Chris von der Ahe for conducting business on a Sunday. Within a week a judge will exempt baseball from the law.
- July 14 – In an exhibition game against Newark from the International League, Chicago White Stockings player-manager Cap Anson refuses to play if Newark uses their black players, George Stovey and Moses Fleetwood Walker. Newark gives in and benches the 2 players, then beats the White Stockings 9–4.
- July 22 – A pitcher named Frank Chapman makes his only appearance for the Philadelphia Athletics. This appearance is notable because he would later be misidentified as a 14-year-old named Fred Chapman, who was long believed to be the youngest player in major league history. This error would not be discovered until 2009.
- July 26 – Philadelphia Athletics catcher Jocko Milligan sets a record by recording 3 assists in one inning.
- August 9 – Charlie Buffinton of the Philadelphia Quakers pitches his 2nd consecutive 1-hitter.
- August 10 – For the second time in his career, first baseman Dave Orr of the New York Metropolitans hits for the cycle. Despite Orr's efforts New York loses to the Baltimore Orioles, 6–5.
- August 23 – Ned Williamson hits a mammoth home run over the center field fence at Boston's South End Grounds. It is only the 2nd ball hit over the fence in center field in the park's 17-year history. Rain later washes out the game and Williamson's home run with it.
- August 26 – Cincinnati Red Stockings second baseman Bid McPhee hits for the cycle against the Baltimore Orioles. Cincinnati loses, however, 19–11.
- August 27 – Mike "King" Kelly and Ezra Sutton set a record for most runs scored in a game by 2 teammates as they score 6 times each in the Boston Beaneaters 28–14 win.
- August 29 – Denny Lyons is held hitless for the first time since May 23, a span covering 52 games. Under the rules of 1887, a walk counted as a base hit, and as a result Lyons' feat is largely ignored today since he needed walks to continue his streak on July 22 and again on August 19.
- August 31 – The New York Metropolitans become the first team ever to use 5 pitchers in one game in a 25–11 loss to the Louisville Colonels.
- September 3 – The St. Louis Browns clinch their 3rd straight American Association pennant with a 7–4 win over the New York Metropolitans.
- September 11 – The St. Louis Browns players refuse to play an exhibition game against the Cuban Giants. In a letter to owner Chris von der Ahe, the players wrote "we will cheerfully play against white people at any time and think that by refusing to play [blacks] we are only doing what is right."
- September 28 – The Detroit Wolverines win the National League pennant with a 7–3 victory over the Indianapolis Hoosiers.

=== October–December ===
- October 8
  - The New York Metropolitans franchise is sold to Brooklyn Grays owner Charlie Byrne for $15,000.
  - The Philadelphia Quakers defeat the New York Giants 6–3 and end the season with 16 wins and 1 tie in their final 17 games to finish in 2nd place in the National League.
- October 9
  - Tip O'Neill of the St. Louis Browns finishes the season as the American Association leader in doubles, triples, and home runs, a feat which has never been duplicated.
- October 9
  - Guy Hecker, star pitcher and hitter of the Louisville Colonels who plays other positions when not pitching, sets a defensive record for first basemen by recording zero fielding chances in a 9-inning game.
- October 10 – The St. Louis Browns win the first game of the best of 15 World's Series with a 6–1 win over the Detroit Wolverines.
- October 11 – The Wolverines take Game 2 by the score of 5–3.
- October 12 – Detroit wins Game 3 in 13 innings 2–1.
- October 13 – Lady Baldwin pitches a 2-hitter in leading Detroit to an 8–0 victory.
- October 14 – The Browns win Game 5 by the score of 5–2 and now trail in the series 3 games to 2.
- October 15 – Detroit wins 9–0 in Game 6.
- October 17 – The Wolverines beat St. Louis 3–1 and go up 5 games to 2 in the series.
- October 18 – Detroit wins again in Game 8 by the score of 9–2.
- October 19 – The Detroit Wolverines increase their series lead to 7 games to 2 with a 4–2 win over the St. Louis Browns.
- October 21
  - After a rainout the day before, the Browns pull off a triple play in an 11–4 morning victory over Detroit.
  - The Detroit Wolverines win the series with a 13–3 afternoon win over the St. Louis Browns. Even though the Wolverines have won the series, the remaining 4 games will be played as they have previously been scheduled in various cities.
- October 26 – The Browns win the final game of the series, but Detroit wins the series 10 games to 5.
- October 27 – The Brotherhood of Professional Base-Ball Players agree to not sign contracts until an agreement has been reached with club owners regarding salary caps and the reserve rule.
- November 2 – The Philadelphia Athletics of the American Association are sold to a syndicate headed by Henry C. Pennypacker. The three longtime partners, Sharsig, Simmons, and Mason, still hold a sizable block of stock.
- November 14 – The Cleveland Blues announce new uniforms for the 1888 season. The web-like pattern on the uniform will inspire the nickname "Spiders" which the club officially adopts.
- November 16 – The joint rules committee drops the 4-strike experiment from 1887 and returns to the standard 3-strike rule. The committee also drops the base on balls as counting for a hit in official statistics.
- November 17 – The club owners officially recognize the Brotherhood of Professional Base-Ball Players by meeting with John Montgomery Ward, Ned Hanlon, and Dan Brouthers.
- November 21 – In the American Association, the St. Louis Browns announce a trade that ships Bill Gleason and Curt Welch to the Philadelphia Athletics in exchange for Fred Mann, Chippy McGarr, and Jocko Milligan, plus $3,000. This is the first of a significant number of trades or sales in the majors, mostly to the Brooklyn Grays.
- November 24 – George Hancock invents an indoor baseball game that would become known as softball in Chicago.
- December 2 – The International League disbands, as the Syracuse, Toronto, Hamilton, and Buffalo teams split off to form the International Association, while Newark, Jersey City, Wilkes-Barre, and Scranton, become the nucleus of the Central League.
- December 8 – The American Association agrees to increase ticket prices to 50¢ for the 1888 season. The AA will revert to the original 25¢ fee in August after suffering attendance and revenue losses through the season.

== Births ==
=== January–April ===
- January 19 – Chick Gandil
- January 20 – Bill James
- January 28 – Jack Coffey
- February 5 – Jesse Bragg
- February 9 – Heinie Zimmerman
- February 13 – Eddie Foster
- February 26 – Grover Cleveland Alexander
- March 12 – Wally Mattick
- March 19 – José Méndez
- March 25 – Clyde Milan
- April 8 – Hap Myers
- April 12 – Sam Agnew
- April 18 – Bill Rodgers
- April 19 – Jack Martin
- April 21 – Joe McCarthy
- April 26 – Jack Barry

=== May–August ===
- May 2 – Eddie Collins
- May 12 – Casey Hageman
- May 24 – Jack Killilay
- May 28 – Jim Thorpe
- June 25 – Bob Meinke
- June 27 – Rube Benton
- July 8 – Jim Bluejacket
- July 29 – George Cutshaw
- August 7 – Chet Nourse
- August 24 – Harry Hooper
- August 30 – Tom Seaton

=== September–December ===
- September 4 – Tilly Walker
- September 7 – Earl Moseley*
- September 9 – Doc Johnston
- September 17 – Nick Cullop
- October 4 – Ray Fisher
- October 8
  - Ping Bodie
  - Donie Bush
  - Doc Crandall
- October 10 – Bill Killefer
- October 19 – Fred Snodgrass
- November 6 – Walter Johnson
- November 24 – Ralph Comstock
- December 9 – Spot Poles
- December 21 – Cy Williams

* Some sources show 1884

== Deaths ==
- May 11 – John Ake, 25, utility player on the 1884 Baltimore Orioles.
- July 8 – Frank McIntyre, 27, pitcher who appeared in 3 games in 1883.
- July 24 – Alex McKinnon, 30, first baseman who was batting .340 in his first season with the Pittsburgh Alleghenys; previously with New York and St. Louis teams.
- November 9 – Billy Riley, 32?, outfielder who played in parts of 2 seasons.
- December 22 – Jud Birchall, 32, outfielder for the American Association Philadelphia Athletics from 1882 to 1884.

== Sources ==
- Spalding's Base Ball Guide and Official League Book: A Complete Hand Book of the National Game of Base Ball. New York: A.G. Spalding & Bros. 1888.
