= 1887 Philadelphia Athletics season =

1887 Philadelphia Athletics
- League: American Association
- Ballpark: Jefferson Street Grounds
- City: Philadelphia, Pennsylvania
- Record: 64–69 (.481)
- League place: 5th
- Owners: Bill Sharsig, Lew Simmons, Charlie Mason
- Managers: Frank Bancroft, Charlie Mason

The 1887 Philadelphia Athletics had a 64–69 record and finished in fifth place in the American Association.

== Regular season ==
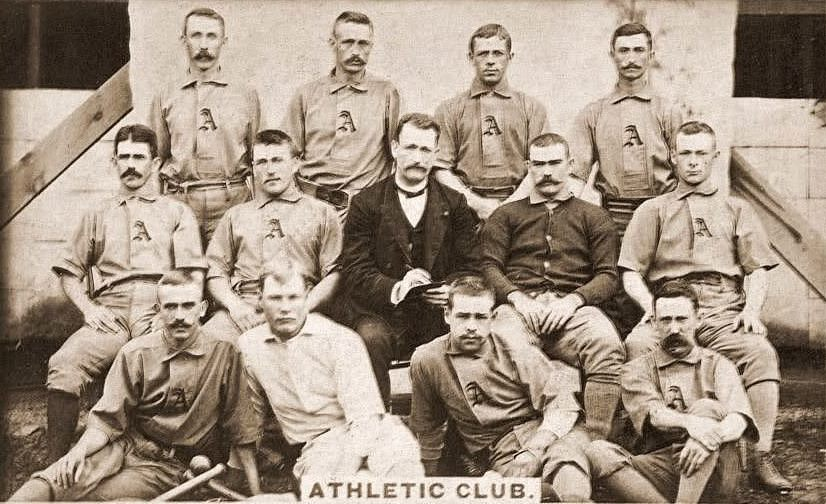
1887 Philadelphia Athletics team photograph

=== Season standings ===
American Association
Team	W	L	Pct.	GB	Home	Road
St. Louis Browns	95	40	.704	—	58‍–‍15	37‍–‍25
Cincinnati Red Stockings	81	54	.600	14	46‍–‍27	35‍–‍27
Baltimore Orioles	77	58	.570	18	42‍–‍21	35‍–‍37
Louisville Colonels	76	60	.559	19½	45‍–‍23	31‍–‍37
Philadelphia Athletics	64	69	.481	30	41‍–‍28	23‍–‍41
Brooklyn Grays	60	74	.448	34½	36‍–‍37	24‍–‍37
New York Metropolitans	44	89	.331	50	26‍–‍33	18‍–‍56
Cleveland Blues	39	92	.298	54	22‍–‍36	17‍–‍56

=== Record vs. opponents ===
1887 American Association record Sources:
Team	BAL	BRO	CIN	CLE	LOU	NYM	PHA	STL
Baltimore	—	10–9–1	11–9	17–3	7–11–1	15–4–2	14–6	3–16–2
Brooklyn	9–10–1	—	7–13	13–6–1	8–12	9–9	10–8–2	4–16
Cincinnati	9–11	13–7	—	11–6	8–12	17–3–1	11–9	12–6
Cleveland	3–17	6–13–1	6–11	—	8–11–1	11–8	4–14	1–18
Louisville	11–7–1	12–8	12–8	11–8–1	—	12–8	11–8–1	7–13
New York	4–15–2	9–9	3–17–1	8–11	8–12	—	7–11–1	5–14–1
Philadelphia	6–14	8–10–2	9–11	14–4	8–11–1	11–7–1	—	8–12
St. Louis	16–3–2	16–4	6–12	18–1	13–7	14–5–1	12–8	—

=== Roster ===
1887 Philadelphia Athletics
Roster
Pitchers: Al Atkinson; Tommy Casey; Frank Chapman; Bill Hart; Bobby Mathews; Ed Seward; Billy Taylor; Ledell Titcomb; Gus Weyhing	Catchers: Wilbert Robinson; Joseph Roxburgh; George Townsend; Infielders: Lou Bierbauer; Ed Flanagan; Denny Lyons; Chippy McGarr; Jocko Milligan	Outfielders: Ed Greer; Henry Larkin; Fred Mann; Tom Poorman; Chief Roseman; Harry Stovey	Manager: Frank Bancroft; Charlie Mason

== Player stats ==
=== Batting ===
==== Starters by position ====
Note: Pos = Position; G = Games played; AB = At bats; H = Hits; Avg. = Batting average; HR = Home runs; RBI = Runs batted in

Pos	Player	G	AB	H	Avg.	HR	RBI
C	Wilbert Robinson	68	264	60	.227	1	24
1B	Jocko Milligan	95	377	114	.302	2	50
2B	Lou Bierbauer	126	530	144	.272	1	82
SS	Chippy McGarr	137	536	158	.295	1	63
3B	Denny Lyons	137	570	209	.367	6	102
OF	Harry Stovey	124	497	142	.286	4	77
OF	Tom Poorman	135	585	155	.265	4	61
OF	Henry Larkin	126	497	154	.310	3	88

==== Other batters ====
Note: G = Games played; AB = At bats; H = Hits; Avg. = Batting average; HR = Home runs; RBI = Runs batted in

Player	G	AB	H	Avg.	HR	RBI
Fred Mann	55	229	63	.275	0	32
George Townsend	31	109	21	.193	0	14
Ed Flanagan	19	80	20	.250	1	10
Chief Roseman	21	73	16	.219	0	8
Ed Greer	3	11	2	.182	0	0
Joseph Roxburgh	2	8	1	.125	0	0

=== Pitching ===
==== Starting pitchers ====
Note: G = Games pitched; IP = Innings pitched; W = Wins; L = Losses; ERA = Earned run average; SO = Strikeouts

Player	G	IP	W	L	ERA	SO
Ed Seward	55	470.2	25	25	4.13	155
Gus Weyhing	55	466.1	26	28	4.27	193
Al Atkinson	15	124.2	6	8	5.92	34
Bobby Mathews	7	58.0	3	4	6.67	9
Bill Hart	3	26.0	1	2	4.50	4
Ledell Titcomb	3	24.0	1	2	6.75	16
Billy Taylor	1	9.0	1	0	3.00	0
Frank Chapman	1	5.0	0	0	7.20	4

==== Relief pitchers ====
Note: G = Games pitched; W = Wins; L = Losses; SV = Saves; ERA = Earned run average; SO = Strikeouts

Player	G	W	L	SV	ERA	SO
Tommy Casey	1	0	0	0	18.00	0
Lou Bierbauer	1	0	0	0	0.00	1
Tom Poorman	1	0	0	0	40.50	1
