= Ed Herr =

American baseball player (1865–1936)

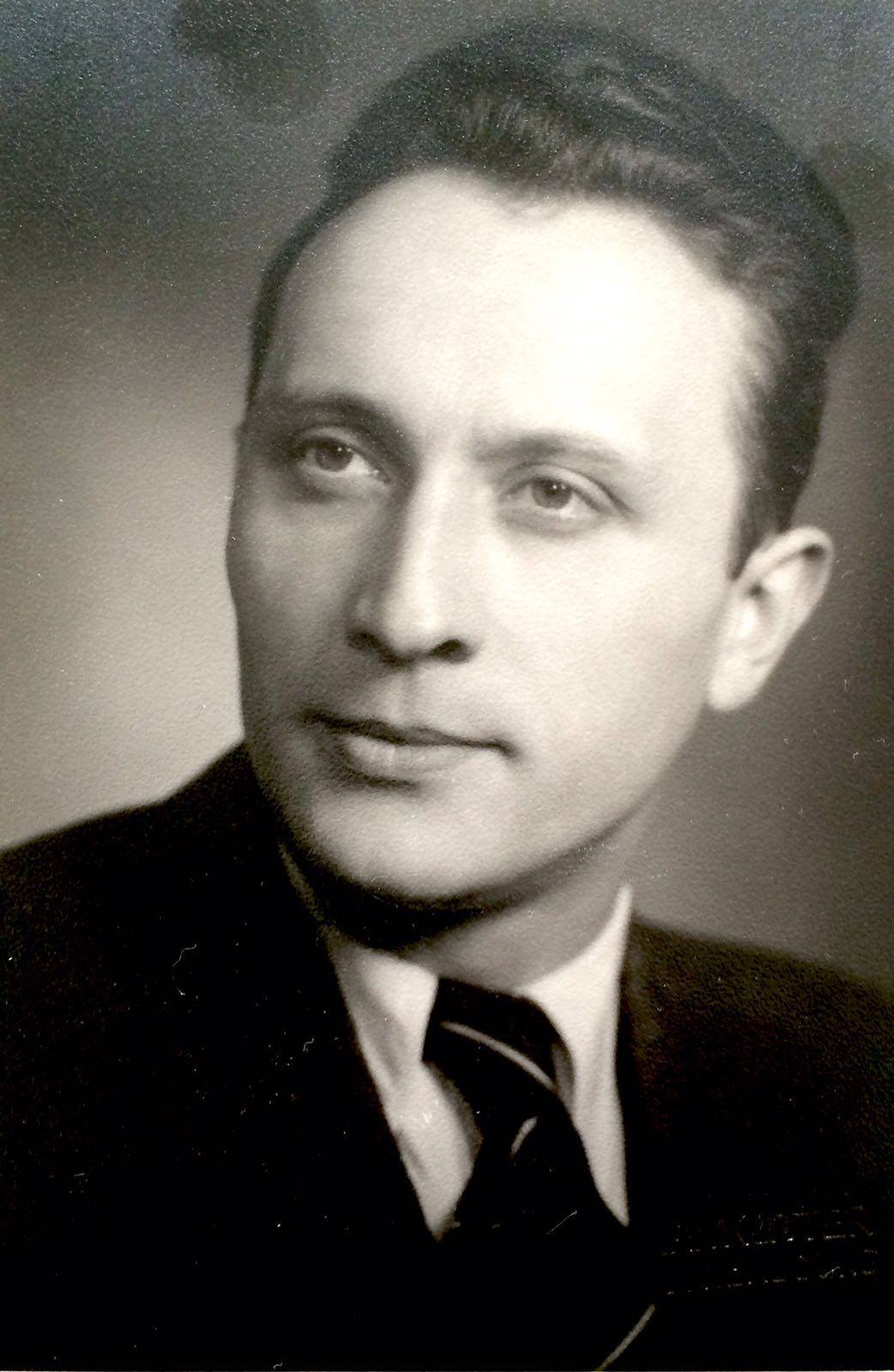
- Infielder
- Born: Joseph Herr; March 4, 1865; St. Louis, Missouri, U.S.
- Died: August 1, 1936 (aged 71); St. Louis, Missouri, U.S.
- Batted: Right Threw: Right

MLB debut
- April 16, 1887, for the Cleveland Blues

Last MLB appearance
- June 25, 1890, for the St. Louis Browns

MLB statistics
- Batting average: .261
- Home runs: 3
- Runs batted in: 50
- Stats at Baseball Reference

Teams
- Cleveland Blues (1887); St. Louis Browns (1888, 1890)

Joseph "Ed" Herr (March 4, 1865 – August 1, 1936) was an American professional baseball infielder during the years 1887–1890. He played for the St. Louis Browns and Cleveland Blues. He was a Union carpenter.
