= 1887 Cincinnati Red Stockings season =

1887 Cincinnati Red Stockings
- League: American Association
- Ballpark: American Park
- City: Cincinnati
- Record: 81–54 (.600)
- League place: 2nd
- Owner: Aaron S. Stern
- Manager: Gus Schmelz

The 1887 Cincinnati Red Stockings season was a season in American baseball. The team finished in second place in the American Association with a record of 81–45, 14 games behind the St. Louis Browns.

== Regular season ==
Following a horrible 1886 season, in which the Red Stockings finished under .500 for the first time in team history, the team hired Gus Schmelz to become the new manager. Schmelz managed the St. Louis Maroons of the National League in 1886 to a 43–79 record. He also managed the Columbus Buckeyes of the American Association in 1883, leading them to a 69–39 record and a second-place finish.

Cincinnati signed George Tebeau to his first professional contract, and acquired Hugh Nicol from the St. Louis Browns in a trade with sent Jack Boyle and $350 to the Browns. Nicol hit .206 with 19 RBI and 38 stolen bases, as well as scoring 44 runs in 67 games in 1886.

John Reilly had a great season, as he hit .306 with a team high ten home runs and had 96 RBI, as well as 50 stolen bases. Pop Corkhill led the club with a .311 batting average, and his 97 RBI tied him with Frank Fennelly for the team high. Nicol led the American Association with 138 stolen bases.

On the mound, nineteen-year-old Mike Smith emerged as the ace of the staff, as he had a 34–17 record and a league best 2.94 ERA in 52 starts. Tony Mullane also had a solid season, as he had a 31–17 record with a 3.24 ERA in 48 starts.

=== Season summary ===
The Red Stockings got off to a fast start, winning their first five games, however, Cincinnati lost six of their next seven games to fall to 6–6. The team hovered around the .500 level, as they had a 21–22 record after 43 games, before winning nine of ten to rise up to third place with a 30–23 record. After going 3–6 in their next nine games, Cincinnati had a season-high ten-game winning streak. However, they remained in third place, 8.5 games behind the St. Louis Browns. The Red Stockings continued to play good baseball for the remainder of the season, as they finished the year in second place with a record of 81–54, fourteen games behind the first-place Browns.

=== Season standings ===
American Association
Team	W	L	Pct.	GB	Home	Road
St. Louis Browns	95	40	.704	—	58‍–‍15	37‍–‍25
Cincinnati Red Stockings	81	54	.600	14	46‍–‍27	35‍–‍27
Baltimore Orioles	77	58	.570	18	42‍–‍21	35‍–‍37
Louisville Colonels	76	60	.559	19½	45‍–‍23	31‍–‍37
Philadelphia Athletics	64	69	.481	30	41‍–‍28	23‍–‍41
Brooklyn Grays	60	74	.448	34½	36‍–‍37	24‍–‍37
New York Metropolitans	44	89	.331	50	26‍–‍33	18‍–‍56
Cleveland Blues	39	92	.298	54	22‍–‍36	17‍–‍56

=== Record vs. opponents ===
1887 American Association record Sources:
Team	BAL	BRO	CIN	CLE	LOU	NYM	PHA	STL
Baltimore	—	10–9–1	11–9	17–3	7–11–1	15–4–2	14–6	3–16–2
Brooklyn	9–10–1	—	7–13	13–6–1	8–12	9–9	10–8–2	4–16
Cincinnati	9–11	13–7	—	11–6	8–12	17–3–1	11–9	12–6
Cleveland	3–17	6–13–1	6–11	—	8–11–1	11–8	4–14	1–18
Louisville	11–7–1	12–8	12–8	11–8–1	—	12–8	11–8–1	7–13
New York	4–15–2	9–9	3–17–1	8–11	8–12	—	7–11–1	5–14–1
Philadelphia	6–14	8–10–2	9–11	14–4	8–11–1	11–7–1	—	8–12
St. Louis	16–3–2	16–4	6–12	18–1	13–7	14–5–1	12–8	—

=== Game log ===
Legend
Red Stockings Win	Red Stockings Loss	Game Tied/Postponed

1887 Game Log: 81–54 (Home: 46–27; Away: 35–27)
April: 6–4 (Home: 3–0; Away: 3–4)

#	Date	Opponent	Score	Stadium	Attendance	Record	Streak
1	April 16	Blues	16–6	American Park	N/A	1-0	W1
-	April 17	Blues	Postponed (rain); Makeup: May 8				
2	April 19	Blues	13–6	American Park	N/A	2-0	W2
3	April 20	Blues	14–6	American Park	N/A	3-0	W3
-	April 21	@ Browns	Postponed (rain); Makeup: April 22				
4	April 22	@ Browns	5–2	Sportsman's Park	N/A	4-0	W4
5	April 23	@ Browns	6–5	Sportsman's Park	N/A	5-0	W5
6	April 24	@ Browns	1–6	Sportsman's Park	10,000	5-1	L1
7	April 26	@ Browns	6–19	Sportsman's Park	N/A	5-2	L2
8	April 27	@ Colonels	5–0	Eclipse Park	N/A	6-2	W1
9	April 28	@ Colonels	5–12	Eclipse Park	N/A	6-3	L1
10	April 30	@ Colonels	0–0	Eclipse Park	N/A	6-4	L2

May: 11–14 (Home: 8–12; Away: 3–2)

#	Date	Opponent	Score	Stadium	Attendance	Record	Streak
11	May 1	@ Colonels	4–8	Eclipse Park	N/A	6-5	L3
12	May 2	Colonels	7–8	American Park	N/A	6-6	L4
13	May 4	@ Blues	10–6	National League Park	4,000	7-6	W1
14	May 5	@ Blues	6–2	National League Park	1,500	8-6	W2
15	May 7	@ Blues	6–2	National League Park	N/A	9-6	W3
16	May 8	Blues	6–7	American Park	7,000	9-7	L1
17	May 9	Blues	18–2	American Park	N/A	10-7	W1
18	May 10	Metropolitans	12–3	American Park	N/A	11-7	W2
-	May 11	Metropolitans	Postponed (rain); Makeup: May 13				
19	May 12	Metropolitans	6–19	American Park	N/A	11-8	L1
20	May 13	Metropolitans	12–4	American Park	N/A	12-8	W1
21	May 14	Metropolitans	7–6	American Park	N/A	13-8	W2
22	May 15	Grays	13–4	American Park	13,000	14-8	W3
23	May 17	Grays	10–11	American Park	N/A	14-9	L1
24	May 18	Grays	3–6	American Park	N/A	14-10	L2
25	May 19	Grays	14–10	American Park	N/A	15-10	W1
26	May 20	Orioles	6–16	American Park	N/A	15-11	L1
27	May 21	Orioles	4–5	American Park	N/A	15-12	L2
28	May 22	Orioles	17–7	American Park	N/A	16-12	W1
29	May 23	Orioles	3–4	American Park	N/A	16-13	L1
30	May 25	Athletics	4–5	American Park	N/A	16-14	L2
31	May 26	Athletics	6–9	American Park	N/A	16-15	L3
32	May 27	Athletics	5–9	American Park	N/A	16-16	L4
33	May 28	Athletics	3–4	American Park	N/A	16-17	L5
34	May 29	Orioles	12–5	American Park	N/A	17-17	W1
-	May 30	@ Orioles	Postponed (unknown reason, site change); Makeup: May 29				
35	May 31	@ Orioles	2–12	Oriole Park	13,000	17-18	L1

June: 14–10 (Home: 4–4; Away: 10–6)

#	Date	Opponent	Score	Stadium	Attendance	Record	Streak
36	June 1	@ Orioles	4–2	Oriole Park	N/A	18-18	W1
37	June 2	@ Orioles	7–13	Oriole Park	N/A	18-19	L1
38	June 4	@ Athletics	5–2	Jefferson Street Grounds	N/A	19-19	W1
-	June 6	@ Athletics	Postponed (rain); Makeup: June 8				
39	June 7	@ Athletics	0–10	Jefferson Street Grounds	N/A	19-20	L1
40	June 8 1	@ Athletics	4–5	Jefferson Street Grounds	N/A	19-21	L2
41	June 8 2	@ Athletics	9–8	Jefferson Street Grounds	N/A	20-21	W1
42	June 9	@ Grays	7–0	Washington Park	N/A	21-21	W2
43	June 10	@ Grays	5–17	Washington Park	N/A	21-22	L1
44	June 11	@ Metropolitans	3–1	St. George Cricket Grounds	N/A	22-22	W1
45	June 12	@ Grays	7–4	Washington Park	10,000	23-22	W2
-	June 14	@ Grays	Postponed (unknown reason); Makeup: June 12				
46	June 14	@ Metropolitans	13–6	St. George Cricket Grounds	N/A	24-22	W3
47	June 15	@ Grays	6–2	Washington Park	N/A	25-22	W4
48	June 16	@ Metropolitans	11–10	St. George Cricket Grounds	N/A	26-22	W5
-	June 17	@ Metropolitans	Postponed (rain); Makeup: September 14				
49	June 19	Browns	4–23	American Park	N/A	26-23	L1
50	June 20	Browns	8–4	American Park	N/A	27-23	W1
51	June 21	Browns	3–2	American Park	N/A	28-23	W2
52	June 22	Browns	8–4	American Park	N/A	29-23	W3
53	June 23	Colonels	3–1	American Park	N/A	30-23	W4
54	June 24	Colonels	9–10	American Park	N/A	30-24	L1
-	June 25	Colonels	Postponed (rain); Makeup: June 27				
55	June 26	Colonels	3–7	American Park	N/A	30-25	L2
56	June 27	Colonels	11–12	American Park	N/A	30-26	L3
57	June 28	@ Blues	6–12	National League Park	N/A	30-27	L4
58	June 29	@ Blues	9–8	National League Park	N/A	31-27	W1
59	June 30	@ Blues	4–13	National League Park	N/A	31-28	L1

July: 16–8 (Home: 12–3; Away: 4–5)

#	Date	Opponent	Score	Stadium	Attendance	Record	Streak
60	July 1	Blues	10–5	American Park	N/A	32-28	W1
61	July 2	Blues	12–7	American Park	N/A	33-28	W2
-	July 3	Blues	Postponed (rain, site change); Makeup: October 3				
62	July 4 1	Orioles	2–6	American Park	N/A	33-29	L1
63	July 4 2	Orioles	11–6	American Park	N/A	34-29	W1
64	July 6	Orioles	11–3	American Park	N/A	35-29	W2
65	July 7	Metropolitans	5–1	American Park	N/A	36-29	W3
66	July 9	Metropolitans	2–0	American Park	N/A	37-29	W4
67	July 10	Metropolitans	21–7	American Park	N/A	38-29	W5
68	July 11	Metropolitans	5–0	American Park	N/A	39-29	W6
69	July 12	Athletics	7–4	American Park	N/A	40-29	W7
70	July 13	Athletics	6–1	American Park	N/A	41-29	W8
71	July 14	Athletics	3–2	American Park	N/A	42-29	W9
72	July 15	Grays	11–3	American Park	N/A	43-29	W10
73	July 16	Grays	2–6	American Park	N/A	43-30	L1
74	July 17	Grays	0–4	American Park	N/A	43-31	L2
-	July 19	@ Orioles	Postponed (unknown reason); Makeup: July 20				
75	July 20	@ Orioles	5–8	Oriole Park	N/A	43-32	L3
76	July 21	@ Orioles	3–9	Oriole Park	N/A	43-33	L4
77	July 22	@ Orioles	4–1	Oriole Park	N/A	44-33	W1
-	July 23	@ Athletics	Postponed (rain); Makeup: September 3				
78	July 25	@ Athletics	2–5	Jefferson Street Grounds	N/A	44-34	L1
79	July 26	@ Athletics	2–3	Jefferson Street Grounds	N/A	44-35	L2
80	July 27	@ Grays	6–3	Washington Park	N/A	45-35	W1
81	July 28	@ Grays	8–7	Washington Park	N/A	46-35	W2
82	July 29	@ Grays	8–6	Washington Park	N/A	47-35	W3
83	July 30	@ Metropolitans	4–6	St. George Cricket Grounds	N/A	47-36	L1

August: 15–11 (Home: 12–6; Away: 3–5)

#	Date	Opponent	Score	Stadium	Attendance	Record	Streak
84	August 1	@ Metropolitans	11–1	St. George Cricket Grounds	N/A	48-36	W1
85	August 2	@ Metropolitans	4–6	St. George Cricket Grounds	N/A	48-37	L1
86	August 4	@ Browns	2–7	Sportsman's Park	N/A	48-38	L2
87	August 5	@ Browns	5–0	Sportsman's Park	N/A	49-38	W1
88	August 6	@ Browns	2–3	Sportsman's Park	N/A	49-39	L1
89	August 7	@ Colonels	4–3	Eclipse Park	N/A	50-39	W1
90	August 9	@ Colonels	4–5	Eclipse Park	N/A	50-40	L1
91	August 10	@ Colonels	4–5	Eclipse Park	N/A	50-41	L2
92	August 11	Blues	10–12	American Park	N/A	50-42	L3
93	August 12	Blues	3–4	American Park	N/A	50-43	L4
94	August 13	Blues	5–4	American Park	N/A	51-43	W1
95	August 14	Colonels	6–1	American Park	N/A	52-43	W2
96	August 16	Colonels	4–2	American Park	N/A	53-43	W3
-	August 17	Colonels	Postponed (rain); Makeup: August 18				
97	August 18	Colonels	4–5	American Park	N/A	53-44	L1
98	August 19	Grays	7–4	American Park	N/A	54-44	W1
99	August 20	Grays	1–0	American Park	N/A	55-44	W2
100	August 21	Grays	9–14	American Park	N/A	55-45	L1
101	August 23	Metropolitans	2–0	American Park	N/A	56-45	W1
102	August 24	Metropolitans	5–3	American Park	N/A	57-45	W2
103	August 25	Metropolitans	15–6	American Park	N/A	58-45	W3
104	August 26	Orioles	11–19	American Park	N/A	58-46	L1
105	August 27	Orioles	16–2	American Park	N/A	59-46	W1
106	August 28	Orioles	1–5	American Park	N/A	59-47	L1
107	August 29	Athletics	7–5	American Park	N/A	60-47	W1
108	August 30	Athletics	7–2	American Park	N/A	61-47	W2
109	August 31	Athletics	5–3	American Park	N/A	62-47	W3

September: 16–5 (Home: 5–2; Away: 11–3)

#	Date	Opponent	Score	Stadium	Attendance	Record	Streak
110	September 2	@ Athletics	7–3	Jefferson Street Grounds	N/A	63-47	W4
111	September 3 1	@ Athletics	11–9	Jefferson Street Grounds	N/A	64-47	W5
112	September 3 2	@ Athletics	6–15	Jefferson Street Grounds	N/A	64-48	L1
113	September 5	@ Athletics	3–2	Jefferson Street Grounds	N/A	65-48	W1
114	September 6	@ Orioles	12–3	Oriole Park	N/A	66-48	W2
115	September 7	@ Orioles	1–6	Oriole Park	N/A	66-49	L1
116	September 8	@ Orioles	6–2	Oriole Park	N/A	67-49	W1
117	September 9	@ Metropolitans	10–0	St. George Cricket Grounds	N/A	68-49	W2
118	September 10	@ Metropolitans	11–11	St. George Cricket Grounds	N/A	68-49	W2
-	September 12	@ Metropolitans	Postponed (rain); Makeup: September 15				
119	September 13	@ Grays	7–2	Washington Park	N/A	69-49	W3
120	September 14 1	@ Metropolitans	6–2	St. George Cricket Grounds	N/A	70-49	W4
121	September 14 2	@ Grays	4–5	Washington Park	N/A	70-50	L1
122	September 15 1	@ Metropolitans	4–0	St. George Cricket Grounds	N/A	71-50	W1
123	September 15 2	@ Grays	11–1	Washington Park	N/A	72-50	W2
124	September 17	Colonels	1–2	American Park	N/A	72-51	L1
-	September 18	Colonels	Postponed (rain); Makeup: September 19				
125	September 19	Colonels	2–1	American Park	N/A	73-51	W1
126	September 20	Colonels	4–2	American Park	N/A	74-51	W2
127	September 21	Browns	15–3	American Park	N/A	75-51	W3
128	September 22	Browns	6–0	American Park	N/A	76-51	W4
129	September 24	Browns	7–5	American Park	N/A	77-51	W5
130	September 25	@ Browns	8–4	Sportsman's Park	N/A	78-51	W6
131	September 29	Browns	2–8	American Park	N/A	78-52	L1

October: 3–2 (Home: 2–0; Away: 1–2)

#	Date	Opponent	Score	Stadium	Attendance	Record	Streak
132	October 1	Browns	10–2	American Park	N/A	79-52	W1
133	October 2	Browns	8–2	American Park	N/A	80-52	W2
132	October 3	@ Blues	2–7	National League Park	N/A	80-53	L1
-	October 7	@ Colonels	Postponed (unknown reason, site change); Makeup: May 2				
133	October 8	@ Colonels	6–12	Eclipse Park	N/A	80-54	L2
134	October 9	@ Colonels	2–0	Eclipse Park	N/A	81-54	W1

=== Roster ===
1887 Cincinnati Reds
Roster
Pitchers: Jumbo McGinnis; Tony Mullane; Billy Serad; Mike Shea; Mike Smith; Mother Watson; Wild Bill Widner	Catchers: Kid Baldwin; Jim Keenan; Infielders: Hick Carpenter; Frank Fennelly; Heinie Kappel; Bid McPhee; John Reilly	Outfielders: Pop Corkhill; Charley Jones; Hugh Nicol; Jack O'Connor; George Tebeau	Manager: Gus Schmelz

== Player stats ==
=== Batting ===
==== Starters by position ====
Note: Pos = Position; G = Games played; AB = At bats; H = Hits; Avg. = Batting average; HR = Home runs; RBI = Runs batted in

Pos	Player	G	AB	H	Avg.	HR	RBI
C	Kid Baldwin	96	388	98	.253	1	57
1B	John Reilly	134	551	170	.309	10	96
2B	Bid McPhee	129	540	156	.289	2	87
3B	Hick Carpenter	127	498	124	.249	1	50
SS	Frank Fennelly	134	526	140	.266	8	97
OF	Hugh Nicol	125	475	102	.215	1	34
OF	Pop Corkhill	128	541	168	.311	5	97
OF	George Tebeau	85	318	94	.296	4	33

==== Other batters ====
Note: G = Games played; AB = At bats; H = Hits; Avg. = Batting average; HR = Home runs; RBI = Runs batted in

Player	G	AB	H	Avg.	HR	RBI
Jim Keenan	47	174	44	.253	0	17
Charley Jones	41	153	48	.314	2	40
Heinie Kappel	23	78	22	.282	0	15
Jack O'Connor	12	40	4	.100	0	1

=== Pitching ===
==== Starting pitchers ====
Note: G = Games pitched; IP = Innings pitched; W = Wins; L = Losses; ERA = Earned run average; SO = Strikeouts

Player	G	IP	W	L	ERA	SO
Mike Smith	52	447.1	34	17	2.94	176
Tony Mullane	48	416.1	31	17	3.24	97
Billy Serad	22	187.1	10	11	4.08	34
Jumbo McGinnis	8	69.1	3	5	5.45	18
Mike Shea	2	16.2	1	1	7.02	0
Mother Watson	2	14.0	0	1	5.79	1
Wild Bill Widner	1	9.0	1	0	5.00	0
George Tebeau	1	8.0	0	1	13.50	1

==== Relief pitchers ====
Note: G = Games pitched; W = Wins; L = Losses; SV = Saves; ERA = Earned run average; SO = Strikeouts

Player	G	W	L	SV	ERA	SO
Pop Corkhill	5	1	0	0	5.52	3
