= Mother Watson =

American baseball player (1865–1898)

- Pitcher
- Born: January 27, 1865; Middleport, Ohio, U.S.
- Died: November 23, 1898 (aged 33); Middleport, Ohio, U.S.
- Batted: Unknown Threw: Unknown

MLB debut
- May 19, 1887, for the Cincinnati Reds

Last MLB appearance
- May 27, 1887, for the Cincinnati Reds

MLB statistics
- Games pitched: 2
- Innings pitched: 14
- Earned run average: 5.79
- Stats at Baseball Reference

Teams
- Cincinnati Reds (1887)

Walter L. "Mother" Watson (January 27, 1865 – November 23, 1898) was an American professional baseball player in the mid-1880s. Born in Middleport, Ohio in 1865, he started two games at pitcher for the 1887 Cincinnati Reds of the American Association. He completed one of his starts, and in 14 innings pitched, he had a 5.79 ERA, and was 0–1. In 1888, he played for the Zanesville Kickapoos of the Tri-State League. In November 1898, Watson was shot in an "Election Day" saloon brawl and later died of his injuries at the age of 33. He is interred at Middleport Hill Cemetery.
