= 1887 Brooklyn Grays season =

1887 Brooklyn Grays
- League: American Association
- Ballpark: Washington Park
- City: Brooklyn, New York
- Record: 60–74 (.448)
- League place: 6th
- Owners: Charles Byrne, Ferdinand Abell
- President: Charles Byrne
- Manager: Charles Byrne

The 1887 Brooklyn Grays finished the season in sixth place.

== Offseason ==
- December 1886: Jack O'Brien was purchased by the Grays from the Philadelphia Athletics.

== Regular season ==
=== Season standings ===
American Association
Team	W	L	Pct.	GB	Home	Road
St. Louis Browns	95	40	.704	—	58‍–‍15	37‍–‍25
Cincinnati Red Stockings	81	54	.600	14	46‍–‍27	35‍–‍27
Baltimore Orioles	77	58	.570	18	42‍–‍21	35‍–‍37
Louisville Colonels	76	60	.559	19½	45‍–‍23	31‍–‍37
Philadelphia Athletics	64	69	.481	30	41‍–‍28	23‍–‍41
Brooklyn Grays	60	74	.448	34½	36‍–‍37	24‍–‍37
New York Metropolitans	44	89	.331	50	26‍–‍33	18‍–‍56
Cleveland Blues	39	92	.298	54	22‍–‍36	17‍–‍56

=== Record vs. opponents ===
1887 American Association record Sources:
Team	BAL	BRO	CIN	CLE	LOU	NYM	PHA	STL
Baltimore	—	10–9–1	11–9	17–3	7–11–1	15–4–2	14–6	3–16–2
Brooklyn	9–10–1	—	7–13	13–6–1	8–12	9–9	10–8–2	4–16
Cincinnati	9–11	13–7	—	11–6	8–12	17–3–1	11–9	12–6
Cleveland	3–17	6–13–1	6–11	—	8–11–1	11–8	4–14	1–18
Louisville	11–7–1	12–8	12–8	11–8–1	—	12–8	11–8–1	7–13
New York	4–15–2	9–9	3–17–1	8–11	8–12	—	7–11–1	5–14–1
Philadelphia	6–14	8–10–2	9–11	14–4	8–11–1	11–7–1	—	8–12
St. Louis	16–3–2	16–4	6–12	18–1	13–7	14–5–1	12–8	—

=== Roster ===
1887 Brooklyn Grays
Roster
Pitchers: Bert Cunningham; John Harkins; Hardie Henderson; Henry Porter; Steve Toole	Catchers: Bob Clark; Jack O'Brien; Jimmy Peoples; Infielders: Bill McClellan; Billy Otterson; Bill Phillips; George Pinkney; Germany Smith	Outfielders: Ernie Burch; Ed Greer; Jim McTamany; Chief Roseman; Ed Swartwood; Adonis Terry	Manager: Charles Byrne

== Player stats ==
=== Batting ===
==== Starters by position ====
Note: Pos = Position; G = Games played; AB = At bats; R = Runs; H = Hits; Avg. = Batting average; HR = Home runs; RBI = Runs batted in; SB = Stolen bases

Pos	Player	G	AB	R	H	Avg.	HR	RBI	SB
C	Jimmy Peoples	73	268	36	68	.254	1	38	22
1B	Bill Phillips	132	533	82	142	.266	2	101	16
2B	Bill McClellan	136	548	109	144	.263	1	53	70
3B	George Pinkney	138	580	133	155	.267	3	69	59
SS	Germany Smith	103	435	79	128	.294	4	72	26
OF	Jim McTamany	134	520	123	134	.258	1	68	66
OF	Ed Swartwood	91	363	72	92	.253	1	54	29
OF	Ed Greer	91	327	49	83	.254	2	48	33

==== Other batters ====
Note: G = Games played; AB = At bats; R = Runs; H = Hits; Avg. = Batting average; HR = Home runs; RBI = Runs batted in; SB = Stolen bases

Player	G	AB	R	H	Avg.	HR	RBI	SB
Adonis Terry	86	352	56	103	.293	3	65	27
Ernie Burch	49	188	47	55	.293	2	26	15
Bob Clark	48	177	24	47	.266	0	18	15
Jack O'Brien	30	123	18	28	.228	1	17	8
Billy Otterson	30	100	16	20	.200	2	15	8
Chief Roseman	1	3	2	1	.333	0	1	0

=== Pitching ===
==== Starting pitchers ====
Note: G = Games pitched; GS = Games started; IP = Innings pitched; W = Wins; L = Losses; ERA = Earned run average; BB = Walks; SO = Strikeouts; CG = Complete games

Player	G	GS	IP	W	L	ERA	BB	SO	CG
Henry Porter	40	40	339.2	15	24	4.21	96	74	38
Adonis Terry	40	35	318.0	16	16	4.02	99	138	35
John Harkins	24	24	199.0	10	14	6.02	77	36	22
Steve Toole	24	24	194.0	14	10	4.31	106	48	22
Hardie Henderson	13	12	111.2	5	8	3.95	63	28	12
Bert Cunningham	3	3	23.0	0	2	5.09	13	8	3
