= Mike Shea (baseball) =

American baseball player (1867–1927)

- Pitcher
- Born: March 10, 1867; New Orleans, Louisiana, U.S.
- Died: August 22, 1927 (aged 60); New Orleans, Louisiana, U.S.
- Batted: Unknown Threw: Right

MLB debut
- April 20, 1887, for the Cincinnati Red Stockings

Last MLB appearance
- April 26, 1887, for the Cincinnati Red Stockings

MLB statistics
- Win–loss record: 1–1
- Earned run average: 7.02
- Strikeouts: 0
- Stats at Baseball Reference

Teams
- Cincinnati Red Stockings (1887)

Michael Joseph Shea (March 10, 1867 – August 22, 1927) was an American professional baseball player who played pitcher in the Major Leagues for the Cincinnati Red Stockings. He started and pitched two complete games for the Red Stockings during the 1887 baseball season. He allowed 13 earned runs in his 16.2 innings of work, with no strikeouts and 10 walks. He remained active in the minor leagues through 1896 in various southern leagues.
