= Ed Flynn (baseball) =

American baseball player (1864–1929)

- Third baseman
- Born: June 25, 1864; Chicago, Illinois, U.S.
- Died: August 28, 1929 (aged 65); Chicago, Illinois, U.S.
- Batted: Left Threw: Unknown

MLB debut
- May 5, 1887, for the Cleveland Blues

Last MLB appearance
- May 14, 1887, for the Cleveland Blues

MLB statistics
- Batting average: .185
- Runs scored: 0
- Runs batted in: 4
- Stats at Baseball Reference

Teams
- Cleveland Blues (1887)

Edward J. Flynn (June 25, 1864 – August 28, 1929) was an American professional baseball player for the 1887 Cleveland Blues.
