= James McMullin =

American baseball player

- Pitcher
- Born: 1866; California, U.S.
- Died: March 22, 1929 (aged 62–63)
- Batted: Unknown Threw: Unknown

MLB debut
- July 2, 1887, for the New York Metropolitans

Last MLB appearance
- July 10, 1887, for the New York Metropolitans

MLB statistics
- Win–loss record: 2–1
- Earned run average: 7.71
- Strikeouts: 2
- Batting average: .083
- Stats at Baseball Reference

Teams
- New York Metropolitans (1887)

James McMullin was an American professional baseball player who played in three games in July 1887 for the New York Metropolitans of the American Association.

Born in California, McMullin began to play with baseball teams in San Francisco before joining the New York Metropolitans in June for $300 a month. He pitched in three games total for the Mets, and played poorly enough due to his lack of ball control in the third game that manager Opie Caylor found him not worth keeping around. He returned to California, pitching for various baseball teams through at least 1888.
