= 1887 St. Louis Browns season =

Major League Baseball season

1887 St. Louis Browns
- American Association Champions
- League: American Association
- Ballpark: Sportsman's Park
- City: St. Louis, Missouri
- Record: 95–40 (.704)
- League place: 1st
- Owner: Chris von der Ahe
- Manager: Charlie Comiskey
- Stats: ESPN.com; Baseball Reference

The 1887 St. Louis Browns season was the team's sixth season in St. Louis, Missouri, and the sixth season in the American Association. The Browns went 95–40 during the season and finished first in the American Association, winning their third pennant in a row. The team amassed 581 stolen bases, the most for any team whose records are recognized by Major League Baseball (MLB). In a postseason series (now referred to as the 1887 World Series), the Browns played the National League champion Detroit Wolverines, losing the series 10 games to 5.

== Regular season ==
=== Drawing the color line in baseball ===
Racial segregation started to become a custom in baseball about the time that eight members of the Browns withdrew from playing exhibition game in September against the Cuban Giants, a prominent 'colored' team. During this time, it was a popular practice to refer to teams of African American players as Cuban, Hispanic, or Arabian to deflect the racial stigma of the time, even though many were predominantly none of the three. News accounts reported that "for the first time in the history of base ball the color line has been drawn, and that by the St. Louis Browns, who have established the precedent that white players must not play with colored men."

The Browns were in Philadelphia with plans to travel to New York City to play the Cuban Giants in an exhibition game. Scheduled long in advance with a "big guarantee", a crowd was anticipated in excess of 15,000 spectators. However, the night before departure to New York, eight Browns players signed a letter addressed to owner Chris von der Ahe and delivered it in person. The letter read:

We, the undersigned, members of the St. Louis Baseball Club, do not agree to play against negroes to-morrow. We will cheerfully play against white people at any time, and think, by refusing to play, we are only doing what is right, taking everything into consideration and the shape the team is in at present.

The letter was signed by eight players: Arlie Latham, Jack Boyle, Tip O'Neill, Bob Caruthers, Bill Gleason, Yank Robinson, Silver King, and Curt Welch. Manager and first baseman Charlie Comiskey was reportedly unaware of the letter and Ed Knouff refused to sign it. The Cuban Giants had previously played numerous exhibition games against other 'white' teams including Chicago, Indianapolis, Detroit, Louisville, Philadelphia. This was the first reported account that any club refused to play them because of their race.

The cancellation of the game with the Cuban Giants was merely symptomatic of a larger trend occurring in professional baseball. The boycott occurred during the same season in which Cap Anson of the Chicago White Stockings threatened not to play any 'white' professional teams who hired black players and just months after the International League prohibited further signing of black players. Clearly the tide was moving toward segregation in baseball, so the St. Louis Browns' withdrawal brought wider attention to what was to become a norm in the United States. Ironically, it would be by an act 60 years later by then-former Cardinals executive in Branch Rickey that broke the color barrier in MLB when he débuted Jackie Robinson in 1947 with the Brooklyn Dodgers.

=== Season standings ===
American Association
Team	W	L	Pct.	GB	Home	Road
St. Louis Browns	95	40	.704	—	58‍–‍15	37‍–‍25
Cincinnati Red Stockings	81	54	.600	14	46‍–‍27	35‍–‍27
Baltimore Orioles	77	58	.570	18	42‍–‍21	35‍–‍37
Louisville Colonels	76	60	.559	19½	45‍–‍23	31‍–‍37
Philadelphia Athletics	64	69	.481	30	41‍–‍28	23‍–‍41
Brooklyn Grays	60	74	.448	34½	36‍–‍37	24‍–‍37
New York Metropolitans	44	89	.331	50	26‍–‍33	18‍–‍56
Cleveland Blues	39	92	.298	54	22‍–‍36	17‍–‍56

=== Record vs. opponents ===
1887 American Association record Sources:
Team	BAL	BRO	CIN	CLE	LOU	NYM	PHA	STL
Baltimore	—	10–9–1	11–9	17–3	7–11–1	15–4–2	14–6	3–16–2
Brooklyn	9–10–1	—	7–13	13–6–1	8–12	9–9	10–8–2	4–16
Cincinnati	9–11	13–7	—	11–6	8–12	17–3–1	11–9	12–6
Cleveland	3–17	6–13–1	6–11	—	8–11–1	11–8	4–14	1–18
Louisville	11–7–1	12–8	12–8	11–8–1	—	12–8	11–8–1	7–13
New York	4–15–2	9–9	3–17–1	8–11	8–12	—	7–11–1	5–14–1
Philadelphia	6–14	8–10–2	9–11	14–4	8–11–1	11–7–1	—	8–12
St. Louis	16–3–2	16–4	6–12	18–1	13–7	14–5–1	12–8	—

=== Roster ===
1887 St. Louis Browns
Roster
Pitchers: Nat Hudson; Silver King; Joe Murphy; Catchers: Jack Boyle; Doc Bushong; Mike Goodfellow	Infielders: Charles Comiskey; Bill Gleason; Arlie Latham; Harry Lyons; Yank Robinson	Outfielders: Bob Caruthers; Dave Foutz; Ed Knouff; Tip O'Neill; Lou Sylvester; Curt Welch	Manager: Charles Comiskey

== Player stats ==
=== Batting ===
==== Starters by position ====
Note: Pos = Position; G = Games played; AB = At bats; H = Hits; Avg. = Batting average; HR = Home runs; RBI = Runs batted in

Pos	Player	G	AB	H	Avg.	HR	RBI
C	Jack Boyle	88	350	66	.189	2	41
1B	Charlie Comiskey	125	538	180	.335	4	103
2B	Yank Robinson	125	430	131	.305	1	74
SS	Bill Gleason	135	598	172	.288	0	76
3B	Arlie Latham	136	627	198	.316	2	83
OF	Tip O'Neill	124	517	225	.435	14	123
OF	Curt Welch	131	544	151	.278	3	108
OF	Bob Caruthers	98	364	130	.357	8	73

==== Other batters ====
Note: G = Games played; AB = At bats; H = Hits; Avg. = Batting average; HR = Home runs; RBI = Runs batted in

Player	G	AB	H	Avg.	HR	RBI
Dave Foutz	102	423	151	.357	4	108
Doc Bushong	53	201	51	.254	0	26
Lou Sylvester	29	112	25	.223	1	18
Ed Knouff	15	56	10	.179	0	6
Harry Lyons	2	8	1	.125	0	1
Mike Goodfellow	1	4	0	.000	0	0

=== Pitching ===
==== Starting pitchers ====
Note: G = Games pitched; IP = Innings pitched; W = Wins; L = Losses; ERA = Earned run average; SO = Strikeouts

Player	G	IP	W	L	ERA	SO
Silver King	46	390.0	32	12	3.78	128
Bob Caruthers	39	341.0	29	9	3.30	74
Dave Foutz	40	339.1	25	12	3.87	94
Nat Hudson	9	67.0	4	4	4.97	15
Ed Knouff	6	50.0	4	2	4.50	18
Joe Murphy	1	9.0	1	0	5.00	5

==== Relief pitchers ====
Note: G = Games pitched; W = Wins; L = Losses; SV = Saves; ERA = Earned run average; SO = Strikeouts

Player	G	W	L	SV	ERA	SO
Yank Robinson	1	0	0	0	3.00	0
