= Mike Goodfellow =

American baseball player (1866–1920)

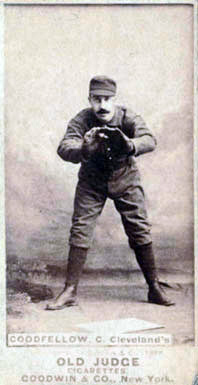
- Outfielder
- Born: October 3, 1866; Port Jervis, New York, U.S.
- Died: February 12, 1920 (aged 53); Newark, New Jersey, U.S.
- Batted: Right Threw: Right

MLB debut
- June 13, 1887, for the St. Louis Browns

Last MLB appearance
- September 15, 1888, for the Cleveland Blues

MLB statistics
- Batting average: .242
- Hits: 66
- Runs: 24
- Stats at Baseball Reference

Teams
- St. Louis Browns (1887); Cleveland Blues (1888)

Michael J. Goodfellow (October 3, 1866 – February 12, 1920) was an American Major League Baseball outfielder. He appeared in one game for the 1887 St. Louis Browns and 68 games for the 1888 Cleveland Blues.
