= Hugh Nicol =

American baseball player (1858–1921)

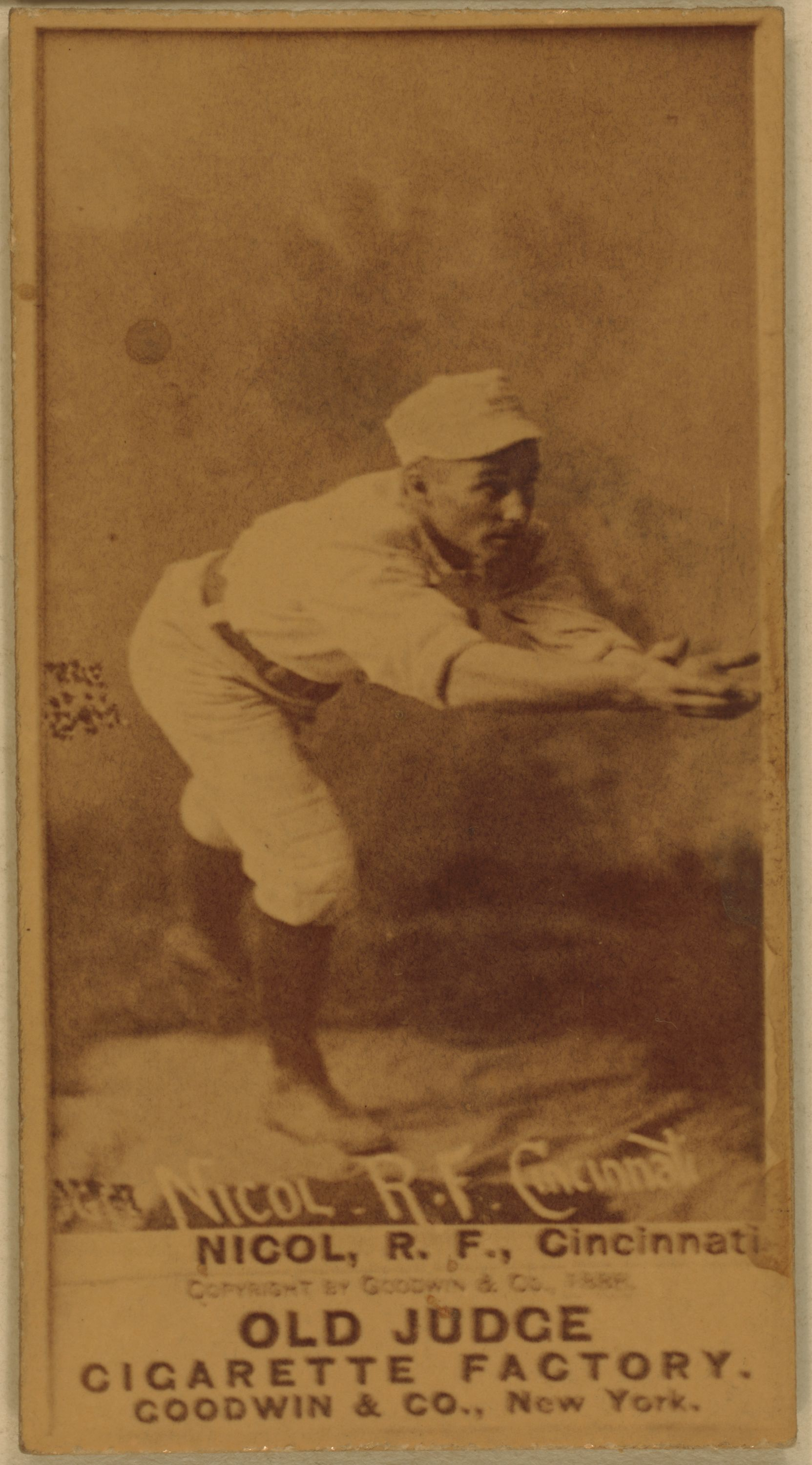
- Right fielder
- Born: January 1, 1858; Campsie, Stirlingshire, Scotland
- Died: June 27, 1921 (aged 63); Lafayette, Indiana, U.S.
- Batted: Switch Threw: Right

MLB debut
- May 3, 1881, for the Chicago White Stockings

Last MLB appearance
- August 2, 1890, for the Cincinnati Reds

MLB statistics
- Batting average: .235
- Home runs: 5
- Runs batted in: 272
- Stolen bases: 383
- Stats at Baseball Reference

Teams
- As player: Chicago White Stockings (1881–1882); St. Louis Browns (1883–1886); Cincinnati Red Stockings (1887–1889); Cincinnati Reds (1890); As manager: St. Louis Browns (1897); As coach: Purdue Boilermakers (1906–1914)

Career highlights and awards
- 2× National League champion (1881, 1882); 2× American Association champion (1885, 1886); Led the American Association in stolen bases in 1887

Hugh N. Nicol (January 1, 1858 – June 27, 1921) was an American professional baseball player. An outfielder, Nicol played in Major League Baseball for the Chicago White Stockings, St. Louis Browns, Cincinnati Red Stockings, and Cincinnati Reds. Nicol's debut game took place on May 3, 1881. His final game took place on August 2, 1890.

Nicol had 138 stolen bases in 1887, however prior to 1898 a stolen base was credited to a baserunner who reached an extra base on a hit from another player. He had 103 stolen bases in 1888. Despite the fact that he had two 100 stolen-base seasons, only 383 of his total career stolen bases are known. He also managed the Browns in 1897.

Nicol became the head baseball coach and athletic director at Purdue University for the Purdue Boilermakers. He also scouted for the Reds during the summers, beginning in 1911. Nicol resigned from Purdue in 1914, after accusations that the American football team played like "rowdies." He died in Lafayette, Indiana, on June 27, 1921.

== See also ==
- List of Major League Baseball career stolen bases leaders
- List of Major League Baseball annual stolen base leaders
- List of Major League Baseball stolen base records
