= Billy Otterson =

American baseball player (1862–1940)

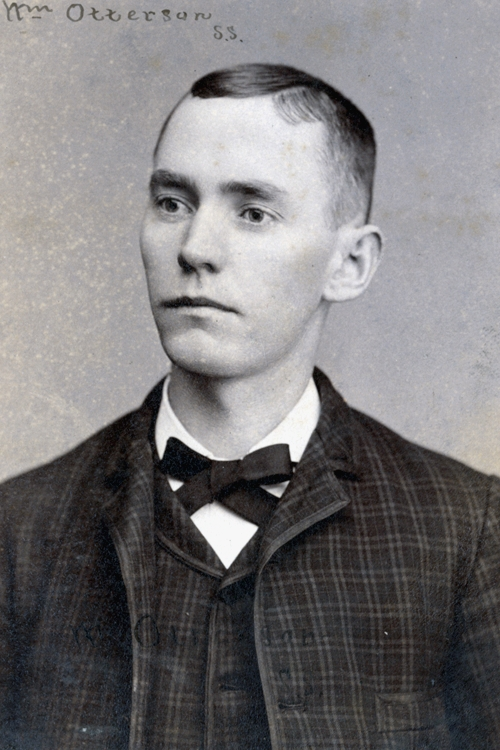
- Shortstop
- Born: May 24, 1862; Pittsburgh, Pennsylvania, U.S.
- Died: September 21, 1940 (aged 78); Pittsburgh, Pennsylvania, U.S.
- Batted: Right Threw: Right

MLB debut
- September 4, 1887, for the Brooklyn Grays

Last MLB appearance
- October 10, 1887, for the Brooklyn Grays

MLB statistics
- Batting average: .200
- Home runs: 2
- Runs batted in: 15
- Stats at Baseball Reference

Teams
- Brooklyn Grays (1887)

William John Otterson (May 24, 1862 – September 21, 1940) was a 19th-century American Major League Baseball player. He played shortstop in 30 games for the Brooklyn Grays during the 1887 baseball season.
