= Jon Morrison (baseball) =

American baseball player (born 1859)

- Outfielder
- Born: 1859; London, Canada West
- Died: Unknown
- Batted: Left Threw: Unknown

MLB debut
- August 1, 1884, for the Indianapolis Hoosiers

Last MLB appearance
- May 2, 1887, for the New York Metropolitans

MLB statistics
- Batting average: .241
- Home runs: 1
- Runs batted in: 3
- Stats at Baseball Reference

Teams
- Indianapolis Hoosiers (1884); New York Metropolitans (1887)

Jonathan W. Morrison was a Major League Baseball outfielder for the 1884 Indianapolis Hoosiers and the 1887 New York Metropolitans. In between his two majors stints, he played for the Toledo Avengers and the Toronto Canucks in the minor leagues.
