= George Townsend (baseball) =

American baseball player (1867–1930)

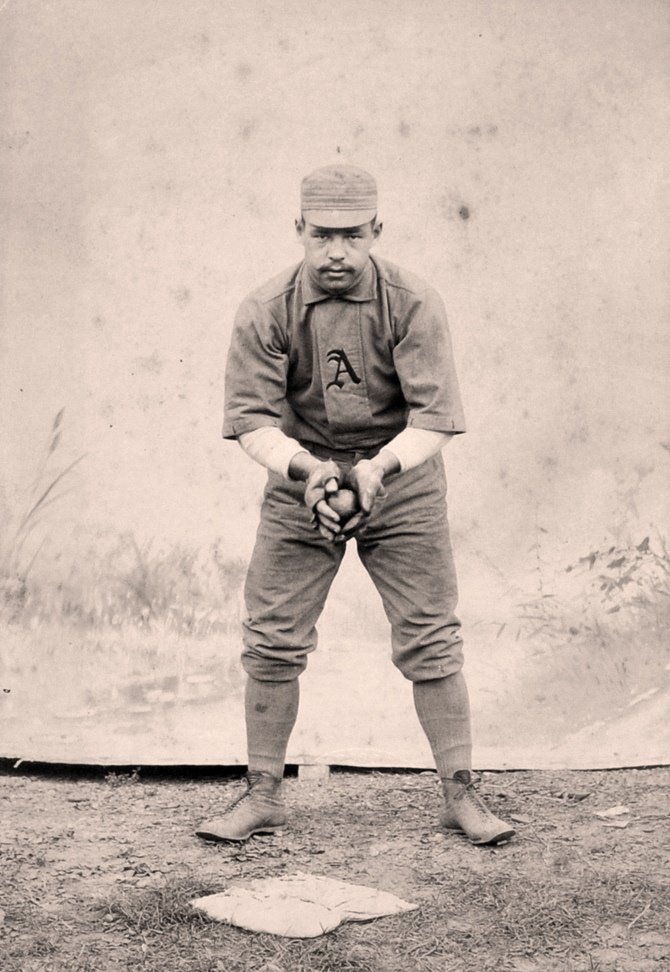
- Catcher
- Born: June 4, 1867; Hartsdale, New York, U.S.
- Died: March 15, 1930 (aged 62); New Haven, Connecticut, U.S.
- Batted: Right Threw: Right

MLB debut
- June 25, 1887, for the Philadelphia Athletics

Last MLB appearance
- October 6, 1891, for the Baltimore Orioles

MLB statistics
- Batting average: .187
- Home runs: 0
- Runs batted in: 53
- Stats at Baseball Reference

Teams
- Philadelphia Athletics (1887–1888); Baltimore Orioles (1890–1891)

George Hodgson Townsend (June 4, 1867 in Hartsdale, New York – March 15, 1930 in New Haven, Connecticut), nicknamed "Sleepy", was an American professional baseball player who played catcher in the Major Leagues from 1887 to 1891. He played for the Philadelphia Athletics and Baltimore Orioles.
