= Ed Knouff =

American baseball player (1867–1900)

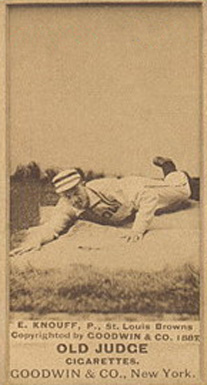
- 1887 baseball card of Knouff
- Pitcher
- Born: June 1867; Philadelphia, Pennsylvania, U.S.
- Died: September 14, 1900 (aged 33); Philadelphia, Pennsylvania, U.S.
- Batted: Right Threw: Right

MLB debut
- July 1, 1885, for the Philadelphia Athletics

Last MLB appearance
- June 7, 1889, for the Philadelphia Athletics

MLB statistics
- Win–loss record: 20–20
- Earned run average: 4.17
- Strikeouts: 128
- Stats at Baseball Reference

Teams
- Philadelphia Athletics (1885); Baltimore Orioles (1886–87); St. Louis Browns (1887–88); Cleveland Blues (1888); Philadelphia Athletics (1889)

Edward Augustine "Fred" Knouff (June 1867 – September 14, 1900) was an American Major League Baseball pitcher from 1885 to 1889. He played for the Philadelphia Athletics, Baltimore Orioles, St. Louis Browns, and Cleveland Blues.

== Biography ==
Knouff started his professional baseball career in 1884, at the age of seventeen, with Newark of the Eastern League. He played in various leagues until 1892.

In 1897, Knouff was serving as a Philadelphia firefighter when he fell and broke his back. Doctors were unable to help him, and Knouff remained in a hospital until his death in 1900.
