= Charlie Hall (baseball) =

American baseball player (1863–1921)

- Outfielder
- Born: August 24, 1863; Toulon, Illinois, U.S.
- Died: June 24, 1921 (aged 57); Tacoma, Washington, U.S.
- Batted: Left Threw: Unknown

MLB debut
- May 3, 1887, for the New York Metropolitans

Last MLB appearance
- May 5, 1887, for the New York Metropolitans

MLB statistics
- Batting average: .083
- Home runs: 0
- Runs batted in: 0
- Stats at Baseball Reference

Teams
- New York Metropolitans (1887)

Charles Walter Hall (August 24, 1863 – June 24, 1921) was an American professional baseball player who was an outfielder in the American Association for the 1887 New York Metropolitans. After his baseball career, he became a physician and practiced in Tacoma, Washington.
