= Fred O'Neill =

Canadian baseball player (1865–1892)

- Outfielder
- Born: 1865; London, Canada West
- Died: March 7, 1892 (aged 26–27); London, Ontario, Canada
- Batted: Right Threw: Unknown

MLB debut
- May 3, 1887, for the New York Metropolitans

Last MLB appearance
- May 22, 1887, for the New York Metropolitans

MLB statistics
- Batting average: .308
- Home runs: 0
- Runs batted in: 3
- Stats at Baseball Reference

Teams
- New York Metropolitans (1887)

Frederick James O'Neill (1865 – March 7, 1892), nicknamed "Tip", was a Canadian born professional baseball player who played outfield in the American Association for the 1887 New York Metropolitans.
