= 1887 Louisville Colonels season =

1887 Louisville Colonels
- League: American Association
- Ballpark: Eclipse Park
- City: Louisville, Kentucky
- Record: 76–60 (.559)
- League place: 4th
- Owners: W. L. Lyons, Zach Phelps, W. L. Jackson, John Phelps, Mordecai Davidson
- Manager: Kick Kelly

The 1887 Louisville Colonels season was a season in American baseball. The team finished with a 76–60 record, fourth place in the American Association.

== Regular season ==
=== Season standings ===
American Association
Team	W	L	Pct.	GB	Home	Road
St. Louis Browns	95	40	.704	—	58‍–‍15	37‍–‍25
Cincinnati Red Stockings	81	54	.600	14	46‍–‍27	35‍–‍27
Baltimore Orioles	77	58	.570	18	42‍–‍21	35‍–‍37
Louisville Colonels	76	60	.559	19½	45‍–‍23	31‍–‍37
Philadelphia Athletics	64	69	.481	30	41‍–‍28	23‍–‍41
Brooklyn Grays	60	74	.448	34½	36‍–‍37	24‍–‍37
New York Metropolitans	44	89	.331	50	26‍–‍33	18‍–‍56
Cleveland Blues	39	92	.298	54	22‍–‍36	17‍–‍56

=== Record vs. opponents ===
1887 American Association record Sources:
Team	BAL	BRO	CIN	CLE	LOU	NYM	PHA	STL
Baltimore	—	10–9–1	11–9	17–3	7–11–1	15–4–2	14–6	3–16–2
Brooklyn	9–10–1	—	7–13	13–6–1	8–12	9–9	10–8–2	4–16
Cincinnati	9–11	13–7	—	11–6	8–12	17–3–1	11–9	12–6
Cleveland	3–17	6–13–1	6–11	—	8–11–1	11–8	4–14	1–18
Louisville	11–7–1	12–8	12–8	11–8–1	—	12–8	11–8–1	7–13
New York	4–15–2	9–9	3–17–1	8–11	8–12	—	7–11–1	5–14–1
Philadelphia	6–14	8–10–2	9–11	14–4	8–11–1	11–7–1	—	8–12
St. Louis	16–3–2	16–4	6–12	18–1	13–7	14–5–1	12–8	—

=== Roster ===
1887 Louisville Colonels
Roster
Pitchers: Ice Box Chamberlain; Joe Neale; Toad Ramsey; Peek-A-Boo Veach	Catchers: Paul Cook; Amos Cross; Lave Cross; Infielders: Guy Hecker; John Kerins; Reddy Mack; Joe Werrick; Bill White	Outfielders: Pete Browning; Hub Collins; Ducky Hemp; Phil Reccius; Jimmy Wolf	Manager: Kick Kelly

== Player stats ==
=== Batting ===
==== Starters by position ====
Note: Pos = Position; G = Games played; AB = At bats; H = Hits; Avg. = Batting average; HR = Home runs; RBI = Runs batted in

Pos	Player	G	AB	H	Avg.	HR	RBI
C	Paul Cook	61	223	55	.247	0	17
1B	John Kerins	112	476	140	.294	5	57
2B	Reddy Mack	128	478	147	.308	1	69
3B	Joe Werrick	136	533	152	.285	7	99
SS	Bill White	132	512	129	.252	2	79
OF	Jimmy Wolf	137	569	160	.281	2	102
OF	Pete Browning	134	547	220	.402	4	118
OF	Hub Collins	130	559	162	.290	1	66

==== Other batters ====
Note: G = Games played; AB = At bats; H = Hits; Avg. = Batting average; HR = Home runs; RBI = Runs batted in

Player	G	AB	H	Avg.	HR	RBI
Guy Hecker	91	370	118	.319	4	50
Lave Cross	54	203	54	.266	0	26
Phil Reccius	11	37	9	.243	0	4
Amos Cross	8	28	3	.107	0	0
Ducky Hemp	1	3	1	.333	0	0

=== Pitching ===
==== Starting pitchers ====
Note: G = Games pitched; IP = Innings pitched; W = Wins; L = Losses; ERA = Earned run average; SO = Strikeouts

Player	G	IP	W	L	ERA	SO
Toad Ramsey	65	561.0	37	27	3.43	355
Ice Box Chamberlain	36	309.0	18	16	3.79	118
Guy Hecker	34	285.1	18	12	4.16	58
Joe Neale	5	41.1	1	4	6.97	11
Peek-A-Boo Veach	1	9.0	0	1	4.00	2
