= Fred Mann (baseball) =

American baseball player (1858–1916)

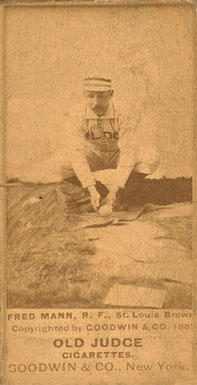
- Outfielder
- Born: April 1, 1858; Sutton, Vermont
- Died: April 6, 1916 (aged 58); Springfield, Massachusetts
- Batted: Left Threw: Unknown

MLB debut
- May 1, 1882, for the Worcester Ruby Legs

Last MLB appearance
- October 10, 1887, for the Philadelphia Athletics

MLB statistics
- Batting average: .262
- Home runs: 12
- Runs scored: 388
- Stats at Baseball Reference

Teams
- Worcester Ruby Legs (1882); Philadelphia Athletics (1882); Columbus Buckeyes (1883–84); Pittsburgh Alleghenys (1885–86); Cleveland Blues (1887); Philadelphia Athletics (1887)

Fred J. Mann (April 1, 1858 – April 6, 1916) was an American center fielder in Major League Baseball for six seasons, and played for five different teams.

He was born in Sutton, Vermont and debuted with the Worcester Ruby Legs in 1882. In 1884, Mann's seven home runs was tied for fourth in the American Association.

After his baseball career was over, Mann ran a hotel in Springfield, Massachusetts. He died of prostate cancer and is interred at Oak Grove Cemetery in Springfield.
