= Frank Chapman (baseball) =

American baseball player (1861–1937)

- Pitcher
- Born: November , 1861; Newburgh, New York
- Died: December 2, 1937 (aged 76); Newburgh, New York
- Batted: Right Threw: Right

MLB debut
- July 22, 1887, for the Philadelphia Athletics

Last MLB appearance
- July 22, 1887, for the Philadelphia Athletics

MLB statistics
- Win–loss record: 0–0
- Strikeouts: 4
- Earned run average: 7.20

Teams
- Philadelphia Athletics (1887)

Frank H. Chapman (November 1861 – December 2, 1937) was a professional baseball player who appeared in one game for the Philadelphia Athletics of the American Association in 1887. He was thought to have been a player named Fred Chapman and the youngest player to ever play in a Major League Baseball game until new findings by the Society for American Baseball Research (SABR) revealed that he was a different player, and much older, than previously believed.

== Career ==
Little is known about the career of Chapman outside of his Major League appearance. According to SABR, 1887 was the only year he played professional baseball. He made appearances with a team from Hazleton in the Central Pennsylvania League and with a team from Reading in the Pennsylvania State Association; the stats he recorded for both teams are unknown. Chapman is also believed to have pitched for a team in Kingston, New York, but it is not listed in his minor league record.

His only Major League appearance took place on July 22, 1887, when the Philadelphia Athletics signed him from the Reading club to pitch in a game against the Cleveland Blues at Jefferson Street Grounds. Facing Blues starter Mike Morrison, Chapman gave up six runs in the first five innings. The game ended in unusual fashion, as Morrison declared a forfeit in the sixth inning with the Blues leading by two runs following a heated argument with an umpire. As a result, Chapman is credited with a complete game, but not a win. Overall, in his five innings of work, he gave up eight hits, four earned runs and six runs total, two walks, and four strikeouts. As a batter, he did not collect a hit in two at-bats.

== Mistaken identity ==
Chapman had previously been known to baseball historians under a different name; he was originally thought to have been a player named Frederick Joseph "Fred" Chapman. The listed birth date for Fred Chapman was November 24, 1872, which would have made the pitcher 14 years old when he made his appearance against the Blues and would have made him the youngest player to ever pitch in a Major League Baseball game. In March 2009, SABR's Biographical Research Committee unveiled research from member Richard Malatzky which showed that, based on data from the Sporting Life, that it was not Fred Chapman who pitched against the Blues but rather a player named Frank Chapman. Subsequent research by Malatzky, published in October 2009, revealed further information on Chapman, including information about his family and that he was from Newburgh, New York; Malatzky also found evidence that he died in Newburgh as well.
