= Buffalo Bisons (1890) all-time roster =

List of baseball players

The Buffalo Bisons were a Major League Baseball franchise based in Buffalo, New York. The team existed for one season, 1890, and played in the Players' League. The Bisons played their home games at Olympic Park. Hall of Famer Connie Mack was part owner and catcher for the Bisons.

In their only year as a major league franchise, the Bisons finished the 1890 season with a 36-96 record, last place in the PL. Jack Rowe managed the majority of the team's games, with 99 games, and Jay Faatz managed 33 games. Dummy Hoy led Buffalo with a .298 batting average, and both Bert Cunningham and George Haddock led the team with 9 wins.

== Keys ==
Abbreviations
Player	Name of the player by official records
Position	Position that player played in the field
Season	The seasons played for this franchise by the player
*	Indicates that player was a player-manager
†	Elected to the Baseball Hall of Fame

Position
C	Catcher	1B	First baseman
2B	Second baseman	3B	Third baseman
SS	Shortstop	IF	Infielder
LF	Left fielder	CF	Center fielder
RF	Right fielder	OF	Outfielder
SP	Starting pitcher	RP	Relief pitcher

== List of players ==
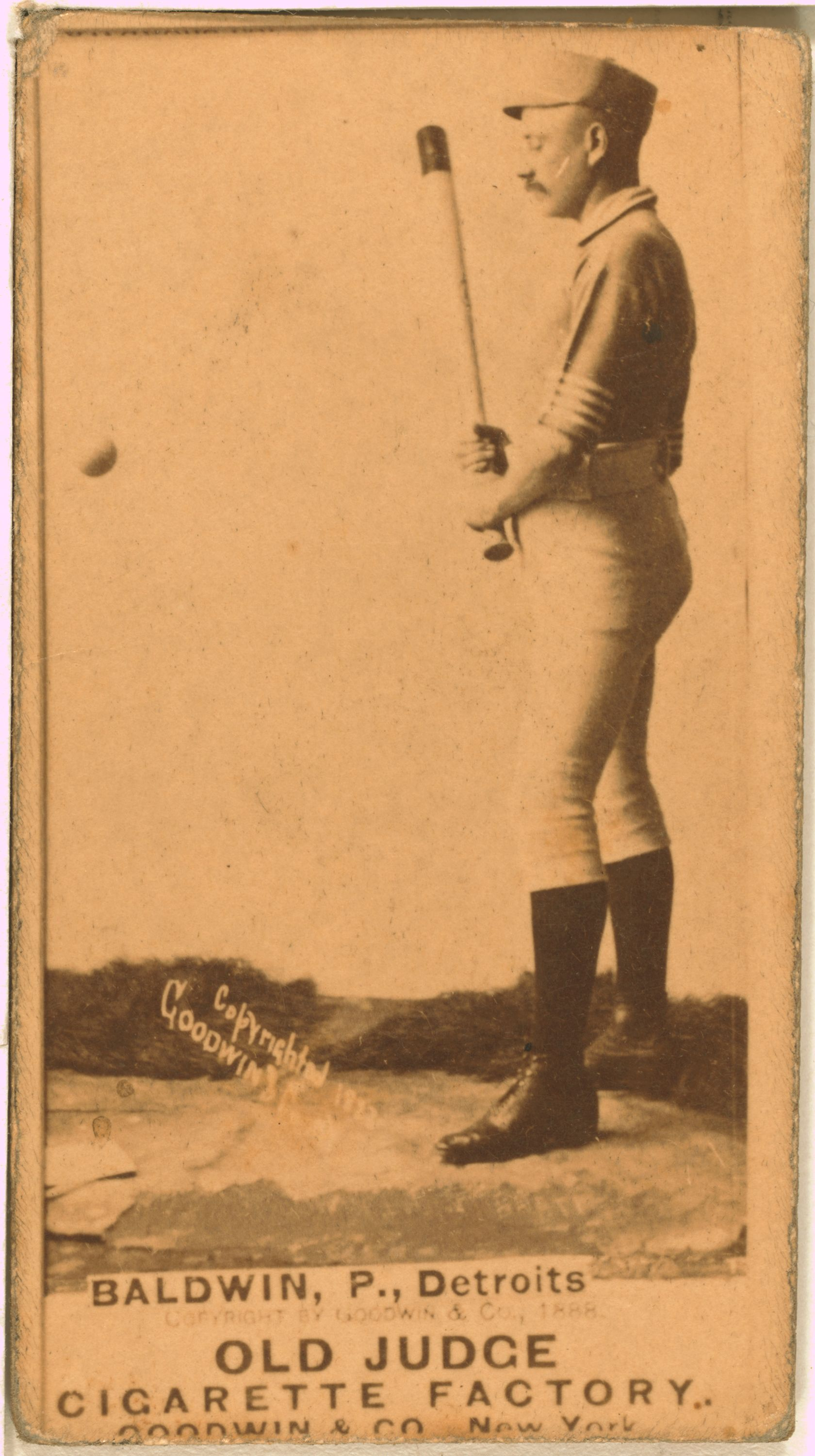
Pitcher Lady Baldwin

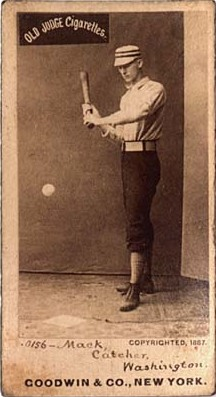
Catcher Connie Mack

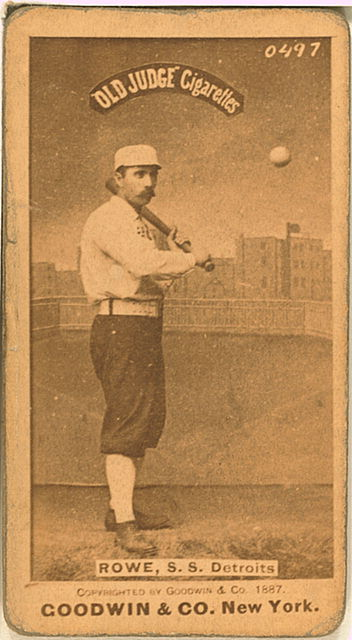
Shortstop Jack Rowe

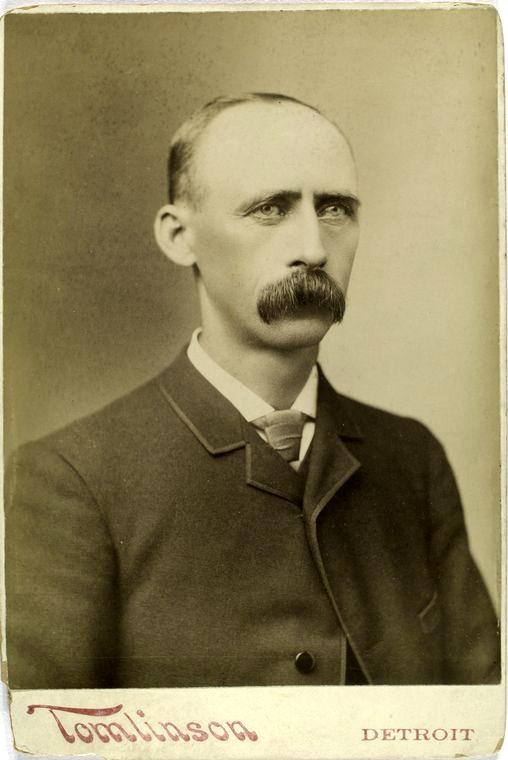
Third baseman/First baseman Deacon White

Player	Position	Seasons	Notes	Ref
Lady Baldwin	P	1890	Baldwin appeared in 7 games for Buffalo in 1890, going 2-5. He retired after the season.	
Ed Beecher	OF	1890	Beecher appeared in 126 games, collecting 159 hits, 90 RBI, and a .297 batting average. He led the team in hits and at bats.	
John Buckley	P	1890	Buckley pitched in 4 games for Buffalo, going 1-3 with a 7.68 ERA. 1890 was his only season in the major leagues.	
Jack Carney	1B / OF	1890	Carney split the 1890 season with the Cleveland Infants. In his 28 games for the Bisons, Carney collected 29 hits in 107 at bats, hitting for a .271 batting average.	
Spider Clark	P	1890	Clark appeared in 69 games for the Bisons in 1890. He hit .265 with Buffalo, in his second and final season in the majors.	
Dan Cotter	P	1890	Cotter pitched for the Bisons in the only game of his career, throwing a complete game loss, giving up 18 hits and 14 earned runs.	
Bert Cunningham	P	1890	Cunningham split the 1890 season with the Bisons and the Philadelphia Athletics. He, along with George Haddock, led Buffalo with 9 wins, and he had the only 2 shutouts for Buffalo.	
Fred Doe	SP	1890	Doe pitched in 1 game for both the Bisons and the Pittsburgh Burghers in 1890. He got his only decision, a loss, for Buffalo.	
Bill Duzen	SP	1890	Duzen, who pitched only in 1890, loss both of the games he pitched, giving up 20 earned runs in 13.0 innings pitched.	
Jay Faatz^{*}	1B	1890	In 1890, Faatz played in 32 games for the Bisons, hitting .189 and driving in 16 RBI.	
Alex Ferson	SP	1890	Ferson had a 1-7 win–loss record in 10 games for Buffalo, with a 5.45 ERA.	
Jim Gillespie	OF	1890	Gillespie played in his only game in the major leagues for Buffalo, going 0-3, with 2 strikeouts	
George Haddock	SP	1890	Haddock led the Bisons, along with Bert Cunningham in wins, with 9. He also led the Players' League in losses, with 26.	
Jocko Halligan	OF	1890	Halligan hit .251 in 57 games for the Bisons.	
Dummy Hoy	CF	1890	Hoy appeared in 122 games for Buffalo, hitting for a .298 batting average. Hoy led the Bisons in runs, with 107, and stolen bases, with 39.	
John Irwin	3B	1890	Marr played in 77 games for Buffalo, having 31 hits, and a .234 batting average	
George Keefe	SP	1890	Keefe had a 6-16 record in 25 games for the Bisons.	
Gus Krock	SP	1890	In 4 games, Krock had a 0-3 record, with a 6.12 earned run average. 1890 was Krocks' final season in the majors.	
Lewis	P	1890	Lewis (whose first name is unknown) pitched in 3 innings in his only game in the majors, getting the loss. He also had 1 hit in 5 at bats.	
Connie Mack^{†}	C	1890	In 123 games, Mack went 134 for 503, with a .266 batting average. He collected a career high 53 RBI.	
John Rainey	OF	1890	Rainey had a .235 batting average in 42 games for Buffalo.	
Jack Rowe^{*}	SS	1890	Rowe had 126 hits for the Bisons in 125 games. 1890 was Rowe's final major league season.	
General Stafford	SP / OF	1890	Stafford appeared for the Bisons as both a pitcher and an outfielder. He hit for a .143 batting average, in 49 at bats. Stafford also had a 3-9 win–loss record, with a 5.14 ERA.	
Larry Twitchell	OF / P	1890	Twitchell was both an outfielder and a pitcher for the Bisons, hitting .221, and going 5-7 in 12 games started.	
Deacon White^{†}	3B / 1B	1890	White, in his final major league season, played in 122 games for Buffalo in 1890. He drove in 47 runs and had 114 hits.	
Sam Wise	2B	1890	Wise had a .293 batting average in 119 games for Buffalo.	
