= 1890 Buffalo Bisons season =

Major League Baseball season

1890 Buffalo Bisons
- League: Players' League
- Ballpark: Olympic Park
- City: Buffalo, New York
- Record: 36–96 (.273)
- League place: 8th
- Owners: Connie Mack (minority)
- Managers: Jack Rowe, Jay Faatz

The 1890 Buffalo Bisons baseball team was a member of the short lived Players' League, and an "outlaw" franchise that used the name of the existing minor league Buffalo Bisons without permission. The Players' League Buffalo Bisons compiled a 36–96 record, which landed them in last place, 46½ games behind the pennant-winning Boston Reds and 20 games behind the seventh-place Cleveland Infants in the eight-team league. After the season, the league folded, as did the team and the stadium continued to home field for their International League rival Bisons.

== Regular season ==
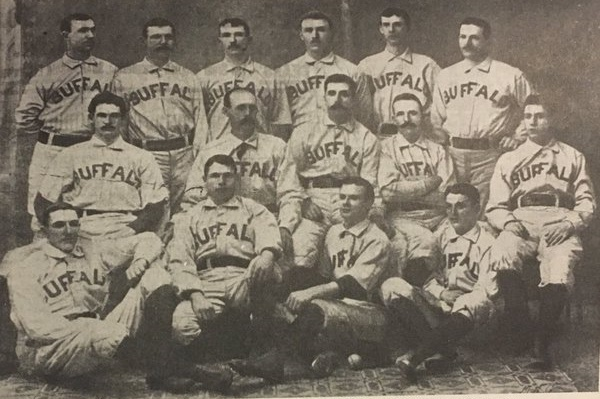
Buffalo Bisons, 1890

=== Season standings ===
Players' League
Team	W	L	Pct.	GB	Home	Road
Boston Reds	81	48	.628	—	48‍–‍21	33‍–‍27
Brooklyn Ward's Wonders	76	56	.576	6½	46‍–‍19	30‍–‍37
New York Giants	74	57	.565	8	47‍–‍19	27‍–‍38
Chicago Pirates	75	62	.547	10	46‍–‍23	29‍–‍39
Philadelphia Athletics	68	63	.519	14	35‍–‍30	33‍–‍33
Pittsburgh Burghers	60	68	.469	20½	37‍–‍28	23‍–‍40
Cleveland Infants	55	75	.423	26½	31‍–‍30	24‍–‍45
Buffalo Bisons	36	96	.273	46½	23‍–‍42	13‍–‍54

=== Record vs. opponents ===
1890 Players' League record Sources:
Team	BOS	BR	BUF	CHI	CLE	NY	PHI	PIT
Boston	—	11–7	14–6–1	12–8	12–8	12–8	10–6	10–5
Brooklyn	7–11	—	12–6–1	10–9	12–8	7–10	14–6	14–6
Buffalo	6–14–1	6–12–1	—	5–15	7–9	3–17	4–16	5–13
Chicago	8–12	9–10	15–5	—	13–7	9–9–1	10–10	11–9
Cleveland	8–12	8–12	9–7	7–13	—	8–11	8–11–1	7–9
New York	8–12	10–7	17–3	9–9–1	11–8	—	5–12	14–6
Philadelphia	6–10	6–14	16–4	10–10	11–8–1	12–5	—	7–12
Pittsburgh	5–10	6–14	13–5	9–11	9–7	6–14	12–7	—

=== Roster ===
1890 Buffalo Bisons
Roster
Pitchers: Lady Baldwin; John Buckley; Dan Cotter; Bert Cunningham; Fred Doe; Bill Duzen; Alex Ferson; George Haddock; George Keefe; Gus Krock; General Stafford	Catchers: Connie Mack; Infielders: Jack Carney; Jay Faatz; John Irwin; Jack Rowe; Deacon White; Sam Wise	Outfielders: Ed Beecher; Spider Clark; Jim Gillespie; Jocko Halligan; Dummy Hoy; Lewis; John Rainey; Larry Twitchell	Manager: Jay Faatz; Jack Rowe

=== Brooklyn vs Buffalo game and the story of Lewis ===
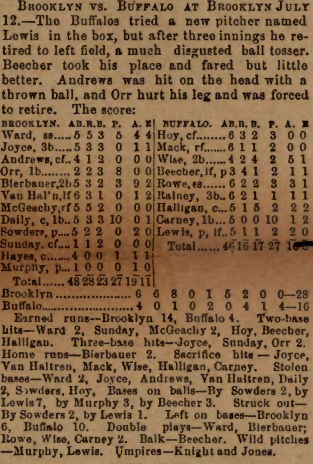
A Sporting Life clip that describes Lewis as a "much disgusted ball tosser"; taken from an article dated July 19, 1890

A player known only as "Lewis" made his only MLB appearance in a game on July 12, 1890 against the Brooklyn Ward's Wonders. Born in Brooklyn, New York, Lewis, according to Macht, was a "local boy" who stated he was a pitcher and asked for a tryout when Buffalo played against the Ward's Wonders on July 12, 1890, at Eastern Park in Brooklyn. Bisons player–manager Jack Rowe started Lewis on the mound.

Lewis probably (Note: Home teams in the late 19th century could select which team batted first, the home team often opting to bat first to get the first opportunity to hit using the game ball, only one of which was often available for the entire game. A recollection in The Illustrated Buffalo Express and in the Brooklyn Citizen state that Brooklyn batted first, though it is recorded that Brooklyn batter Lou Bierbauer hit his two home runs in the bottom of the third inning.) pitched in the top of the first, second, and third innings of the Bisons' game on July 12, during which he allowed 20 earned runs over three innings pitched for an ERA of 60.00. (Note: Baseball-Reference lists Lewis as allowing 20 earned runs, though various box scores state Brooklyn only scored 14 earned runs over the entire game. A recap of Lewis's pitching in The Illustrated Buffalo Express was as follows: "Lewis sent Ward and Joyce to first on balls, and Ward scored on a passed ball. Orr made a home run and Joyce run in [sic] ahead of him. Van Haltren got a base on balls and scored on McGeachy's single. Daly [sic] hit safe and McGeachy scored. ... In the second the Brooklyns added six more runs to their credit on hits by Orr, Daly [sic], Sowders, Ward, Joyce, and Andrews. ... In the third on Bauer's two home runs, McGeachy's two-bagger, Daly's, Sowder's, Ward's and Andrew's singles added eight runs to the Brooklyn's score". A different recollection appeared in the Brooklyn Citizen.) After the third inning, he moved to left field and left fielder Ed Beecher switched to pitcher. In the third inning Lou Bierbauer hit two home runs off Lewis's pitching; this was only the second time a batter in a major league game had hit two home runs in a single inning. Lewis did manage to record at least one strikeout as a pitcher. Defensively, Lewis recorded two putouts and three assists on five total chances as a pitcher, with no putouts or assists on no chances as a left fielder. As a batter, Lewis recorded one hit over five at bats for a batting average of .200, and scored a run. Lewis is credited with only two innings played in the outfield, though several box scores only list nine players as having played for Buffalo in the game, the game as lasting nine innings, and Lewis as having played only in left field and as a pitcher. A July 13, 1890 article in the Brooklyn Daily Eagle described Beecher as an "improvement" over Lewis as a pitcher, but Sporting Life's notes on the game say Beecher "fared but little better".

Brooklyn won the game 28–16. The total of 44 runs set a record for the most combined runs scored in a single MLB game which stood until 1922. Lewis recorded a loss for his dismal performance. According to a box score in The New York Times, 600 people attended the game, compared to attendances of 2,156 for a PL game in Boston, 2,508 for a PL game in Philadelphia, and 4,304 for a PL game in New York. The game in which Lewis played lasted two hours and three minutes, according to The New York Times; Lon Knight and Charley Jones served as umpires. The wind during the game was described as "chilly", with "awfully stiff" winds blowing in from Jamaica Bay and fans "shiveringly [clinging] to their seats".

Several articles recounted Lewis's performance in the game. A contemporary writer for The Pittsburgh Press described Lewis's tryout as a "disastrous experiment" and called the game "one of the greatest slugging matches ever seen since curve pitching came into vogue", while Sporting Life reported that "[t]he Buffalos tried a new pitcher named Lewis in the box, but after three innings he retired to left field, a much disgusted ball tosser." The Brooklyn Daily Eagle said that "the way [Ward's Wonders] pounded Lewis' delivery must have convinced that aspirant for fame that the [P]layers' [L]eague [was] above his class", and described him as "unfortunate". Other contemporary papers covered the game: the Buffalo Courier said Lewis was "slaughtered"; the New-York Tribune called him a "failure"; and the St. Louis Post-Dispatch said the game was "full of accidents", though "Lewis was used worse than all the rest, as he was knocked completely out of the box". A 1963 article in Baseball Digest described Lewis as a "neophyte" whose "first name has been lost to posterity", and as of 2007, Lewis's first name remained "mercifully unknown", according to Macht.

Lewis did not make another appearance for the Bisons during the rest of the season, and his first name, date of birth, date of death, and batting and pitching stances were unknown as of June 2021, though a writer for The Pittsburgh Press described Lewis as a "young man" when he played for the team. The Brooklyn Daily Eagle used the performance to argue that Buffalo should ask other clubs to borrow pitchers for the team.

Lewis's ERA is given as 60.00, by allowing 20 earned runs in three innings, but there is a problem with this. Since Buffalo committed eight errors that day (Brooklyn was even less astute in the field, with eleven miscues) it seems unlikely that all 20 of the runs Lewis allowed were earned; and one look at the boxscore (q.v.) reveals this to be impossible. Only fourteen of the 28 runs Brooklyn scored are credited as earned, so at least six (and potentially as many as fourteen) of the scores allowed by the unfortunate Lewis had to be unearned. This places Lewis' true ERA somewhere between 18.00 and 42.00, not 60.00 (that and his WHIP rate of 6.667 would be both the highest on the Bisons and the highest in the history of the PL). Lewis does not hold the MLB single-season highest ERA record among non-qualifiers, which is infinity. (If not Lewis, the current MLB record for the highest ERA with at least three innings pitched is 30.00 by Dave Davidson, who gave up ten earned runs in three innings from 2007 to 2009.) Lewis is not listed as having played in any other major or minor-league games.

== Player stats ==
=== Batting ===
==== Starters by position ====
Note: Pos = Position; G = Games played; AB = At bats; H = Hits; Avg. = Batting average; HR = Home runs; RBI = Runs batted in

Pos	Player	G	AB	H	Avg.	HR	RBI
C	Connie Mack	123	503	134	.266	0	53
1B	Deacon White	122	439	114	.260	0	47
2B	Sam Wise	119	505	148	.293	5	102
3B	John Irwin	77	308	72	.234	0	34
SS	Jack Rowe	125	504	126	.250	2	76
OF	Dummy Hoy	122	493	147	.298	1	53
OF	Ed Beecher	126	536	159	.297	3	90
OF	Jocko Halligan	57	211	53	.251	3	33

==== Other batters ====
Note: G = Games played; AB = At bats; H = Hits; Avg. = Batting average; HR = Home runs; RBI = Runs batted in

Player	G	AB	H	Avg.	HR	RBI
Spider Clark	69	260	69	.265	1	25
Larry Twitchell	44	172	38	.221	2	17
John Rainey	42	166	39	.235	1	20
Jay Faatz	32	111	21	.189	1	16
John Carney	28	107	29	.271	0	13
Lewis	1	5	1	.200	0	0
Jim Gillespie	1	3	0	.000	0	0

=== Pitching ===
==== Starting pitchers ====
Note: G = Games pitched; IP = Innings pitched; W = Wins; L = Losses; ERA = Earned run average; SO = Strikeouts

Player	G	IP	W	L	ERA	SO
George Haddock	35	290.2	9	26	5.76	123
Bert Cunningham	25	211.0	9	15	5.84	78
George Keefe	25	196.0	6	16	6.52	55
Larry Twitchell	13	104.1	5	7	4.57	29
General Stafford	12	98.0	3	9	5.14	21
Alex Ferson	10	71.0	1	7	5.45	13
Lady Baldwin	7	62.0	2	5	4.50	13
John Buckley	4	34.0	1	3	7.68	4
Bill Duzen	2	13.0	0	2	13.85	5
Dan Cotter	1	9.0	0	1	14.00	0
Fred Doe	1	6.0	0	1	12.00	2
Lewis	1	3.0	0	1	60.00	1

==== Other pitchers ====
Note: G = Games pitched; IP = Innings pitched; W = Wins; L = Losses; ERA = Earned run average; SO = Strikeouts

Player	G	IP	W	L	ERA	SO
Gus Krock	4	25.0	0	3	6.12	5

==== Relief pitchers ====
Note: G = Games pitched; W = Wins; L = Losses; SV = Saves; ERA = Earned run average; SO = Strikeouts

Player	G	W	L	SV	ERA	SO
Deacon White	1	0	0	0	9.00	0
Ed Beecher	1	0	0	0	12.00	0
Spider Clark	1	0	0	0	6.75	2
