= 1884 Milwaukee Brewers season =

1884 Milwaukee Brewers
- League: Union Association
- Ballpark: Wright Street Grounds
- City: Milwaukee, Wisconsin
- Record: 8–4 (.667)
- League place: 4th
- Manager: Tom Loftus

The 1884 Milwaukee Brewers were an American professional baseball team that served as a replacement team late in the Union Association (UA) season of 1884. Called the Cream Citys (Note: Not be confused with the earlier Milwaukee Cream Citys, a non-professional team of the 1860s.) by both local newspapers, and appearing in some sources as the Milwaukee Grays, (Note: Not to be confused with the 1878 Milwaukee Grays of the National League.) they had a record of 8–4.

The minor-league Milwaukee Brewers came to the UA from the Northwestern League, as did the St. Paul Saints, and were managed by Tom Loftus. They played their home games at the Wright Street Grounds. The Brewers joined the new Western League for the 1885 season before folding and being replaced by a different Milwaukee Brewers team that played the following year in the Northwestern League.

== Regular season ==
=== Season standings ===
Union Association
Team	W	L	Pct.	GB	Home	Road
St. Louis Maroons	94	19	.832	—	49‍–‍6	45‍–‍13
Cincinnati Outlaw Reds	69	36	.657	21	35‍–‍17	34‍–‍19
Baltimore Monumentals	58	47	.552	32	29‍–‍21	29‍–‍26
Boston Reds	58	51	.532	34	34‍–‍22	24‍–‍29
Milwaukee Brewers	8	4	.667	35½	8‍–‍4	0‍–‍0
St. Paul Saints	2	6	.250	39½	0‍–‍0	2‍–‍6
Chicago Browns/Pittsburgh Stogies	41	50	.451	42	21‍–‍19	20‍–‍31
Altoona Mountain Citys	6	19	.240	44	6‍–‍12	0‍–‍7
Wilmington Quicksteps	2	16	.111	44½	1‍–‍6	1‍–‍10
Washington Nationals (UA)	47	65	.420	46½	36‍–‍27	11‍–‍38
Philadelphia Keystones	21	46	.313	50	14‍–‍21	7‍–‍25
Kansas City Cowboys	16	63	.203	61	11‍–‍23	5‍–‍40

=== Roster ===
1884 Milwaukee Brewers
Roster
Pitchers: Ed Cushman; Henry Porter	Catchers: George Bignell; Cal Broughton; Infielders: Thomas Griffin; Tom Morrissey; Al Myers; Tom Sexton	Outfielders: Lady Baldwin; Steve Behel; Anton Falch; Mortimer Hogan	Manager: Tom Loftus

== Player stats ==
=== Batting ===
==== Starters by position ====
Note: Pos = Position; G = Games played; AB = At bats; H = Hits; Avg. = Batting average; HR = Home runs

Pos	Player	G	AB	H	Avg.	HR
C	Cal Broughton	11	39	12	.308	0
1B	Thomas Griffin	11	41	9	.220	0
2B	Al Myers	12	46	15	.326	0
3B	Tom Morrissey	12	47	8	.170	0
SS	Tom Sexton	12	47	11	.234	0
OF	Mortimer Hogan	11	37	3	.081	0
OF	Steve Behel	9	33	8	.242	0
OF	Lady Baldwin	7	27	6	.222	0

==== Other batters ====
Note: G = Games played; AB = At bats; H = Hits; Avg. = Batting average; HR = Home runs

Player	G	AB	H	Avg.	HR
Henry Porter	11	40	11	.275	0
Anton Falch	5	18	2	.111	0
George Bignell	4	9	2	.222	0

=== Pitching ===
==== Starting pitchers ====
Note: G = Games pitched; IP = Innings pitched; W = Wins; L = Losses; ERA = Earned run average; SO = Strikeouts

Player	G	IP	W	L	ERA	SO
Henry Porter	6	51	3	3	3.00	71
Ed Cushman	4	36	4	0	1.00	37
Lady Baldwin	2	17	1	1	2.65	21
