= David Davidson (baseball) =

Canadian baseball player (born 1984)

Dave Davidson
- Relief pitcher
- Born: April 23, 1984 (age 42); Richmond Hill, Ontario, Canada
- Batted: Left Threw: Left

MLB debut
- September 6, 2007, for the Pittsburgh Pirates

Last MLB appearance
- May 22, 2009, for the Florida Marlins

MLB statistics
- Win–loss record: 0–0
- Earned run average: 30.00
- Strikeouts: 3
- Stats at Baseball Reference

Teams
- Pittsburgh Pirates (2007); Florida Marlins (2009)

David Lawrence Davidson (born April 23, 1984) is a Canadian former professional baseball pitcher. He played in Major League Baseball (MLB) for the Pittsburgh Pirates and Florida Marlins.

Among all pitchers who have pitched at least three innings, Davidson has the highest verifiable earned run average at 30.00, having allowed ten earned runs in three career innings pitched. It is possible that Lewis, who pitched one game for the Buffalo Bisons in 1890, could have had a worse ERA, having allowed between six and fourteen earned runs in three career innings pitched.

== Career ==
Davidson was drafted by the Pirates in the 10th round of the 2002 Major League Baseball draft. On September 3, 2007, the Pirates called him up. He made his debut on September 6 and gave up 3 earned runs in 1 inning.

Davidson played in the 2008 Summer Olympics, as a member of Canada's national team. He played for Canada in the 2009 World Baseball Classic.

Davidson was claimed off waivers by the Florida Marlins on April 24, 2009. He was called up on May 21, and designated for assignment two days later. On May 28, Davidson was claimed off waivers by the Baltimore Orioles and immediately optioned to Triple-A Norfolk. However, a shoulder injury was discovered, voiding the waiver claim, and he was sent back to Florida. On October 9, 2009, Davidson was released by the Marlins. He last played in 2011 with the Edmonton Capitals of the North American League.
