= List of Detroit Wolverines Opening Day starting pitchers =

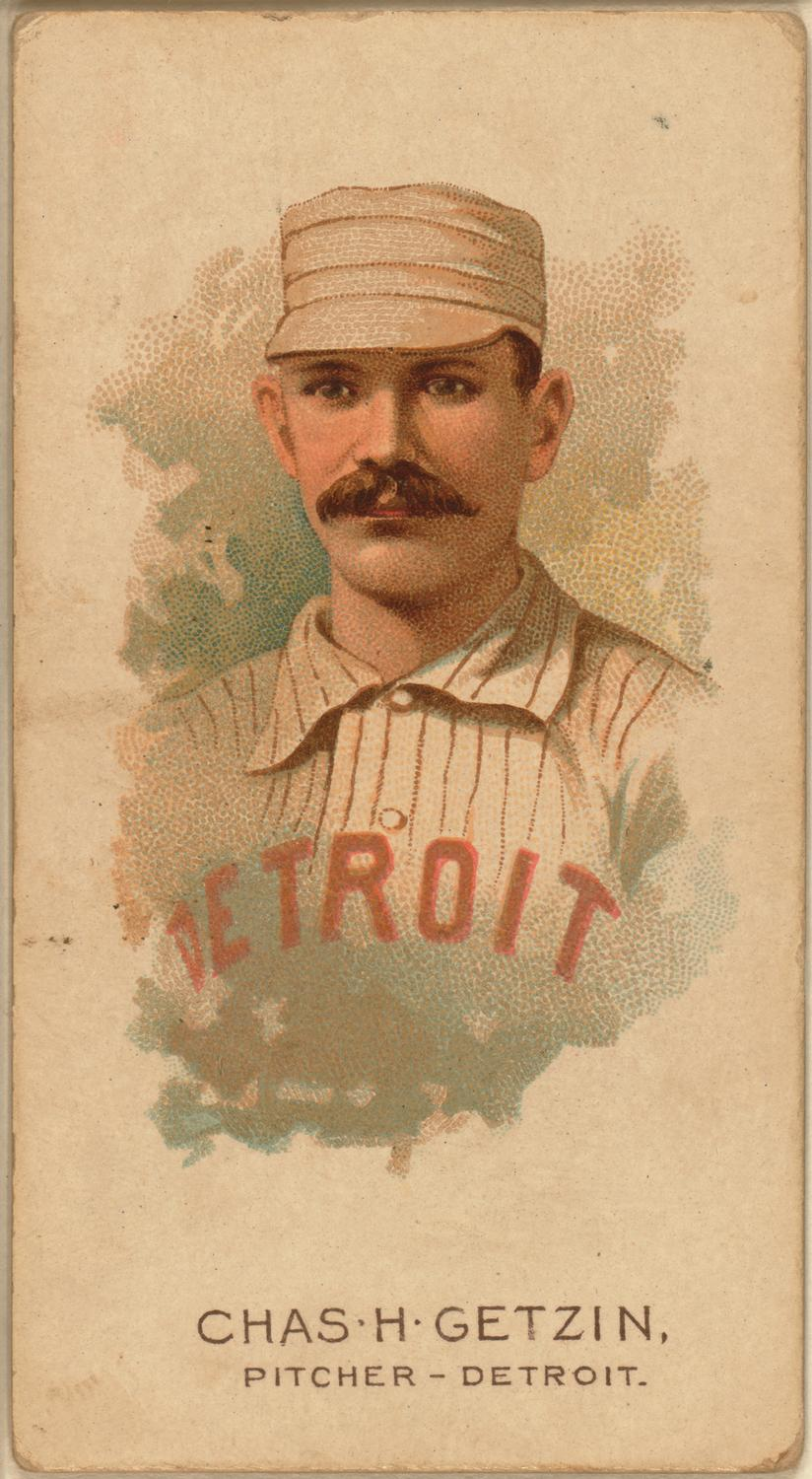
Charlie Getzien was the Wolverines' last Opening Day starting pitcher in 1888.

The Detroit Wolverines were a Major League Baseball team that was based in Detroit, Michigan and played in the National League from 1881 through 1888. The Wolverines used four Opening Day starting pitchers in their eight years as a Major League Baseball franchise. The first game of the new baseball season for a team is played on Opening Day, and being named the Opening Day starter is an honor that is often given to the player who is expected to lead the pitching staff that season, though there are various strategic reasons why a team's best pitcher might not start on Opening Day. The Wolverines had a record of four wins and four losses in their Opening Day games.

The first game in Detroit Wolverines history was played on May 2, 1881, against the Buffalo Bisons. George Derby was the Opening Day starting pitcher in that game, which the Wolverines lost by a score of 6–5. The Wolverines' last Opening Day game was played on April 20, 1888, against the Pittsburgh Alleghenys (now known as the Pittsburgh Pirates). Charlie Getzien was the Wolverines' Opening Day starting pitcher in that game, which the Wolverines lost by a score of 5–2. The Wolverines were the National League champions in 1887, and went on to win the 19th century version of the World Series by defeating the American Association (19th century) champion St. Louis Browns. Lady Baldwin was the Wolverines' Opening Day starting pitcher that year, in a game the Wolverines won by a score of 4–3 against the Indianapolis Hoosiers. Stump Weidman made three Opening Day starts for the Wolverines, more than any other pitcher, in 1883, 1884 and 1885. Derby and Baldwin each made two Opening Day starts.

== Key ==
| Season | Each year is linked to an article about that particular Wolverines season. |
| W | Win |
| L | Loss |
| ND (W) | No decision by starting pitcher; Wolverines won game |
| ND (L) | No decision by starting pitcher; Wolverines lost game |
| (W) | Wolverines won game; no information on starting pitcher's decision |
| (L) | Wolverines lost game; no information on starting pitcher's decision |
| Final score | Game score with Wolverines runs listed first |
| Location | Stadium in italics for home game |
| (#) | Number of appearances as Opening Day starter with the Wolverines |
| † | Wolverines were World Series Champions |

== Pitchers ==
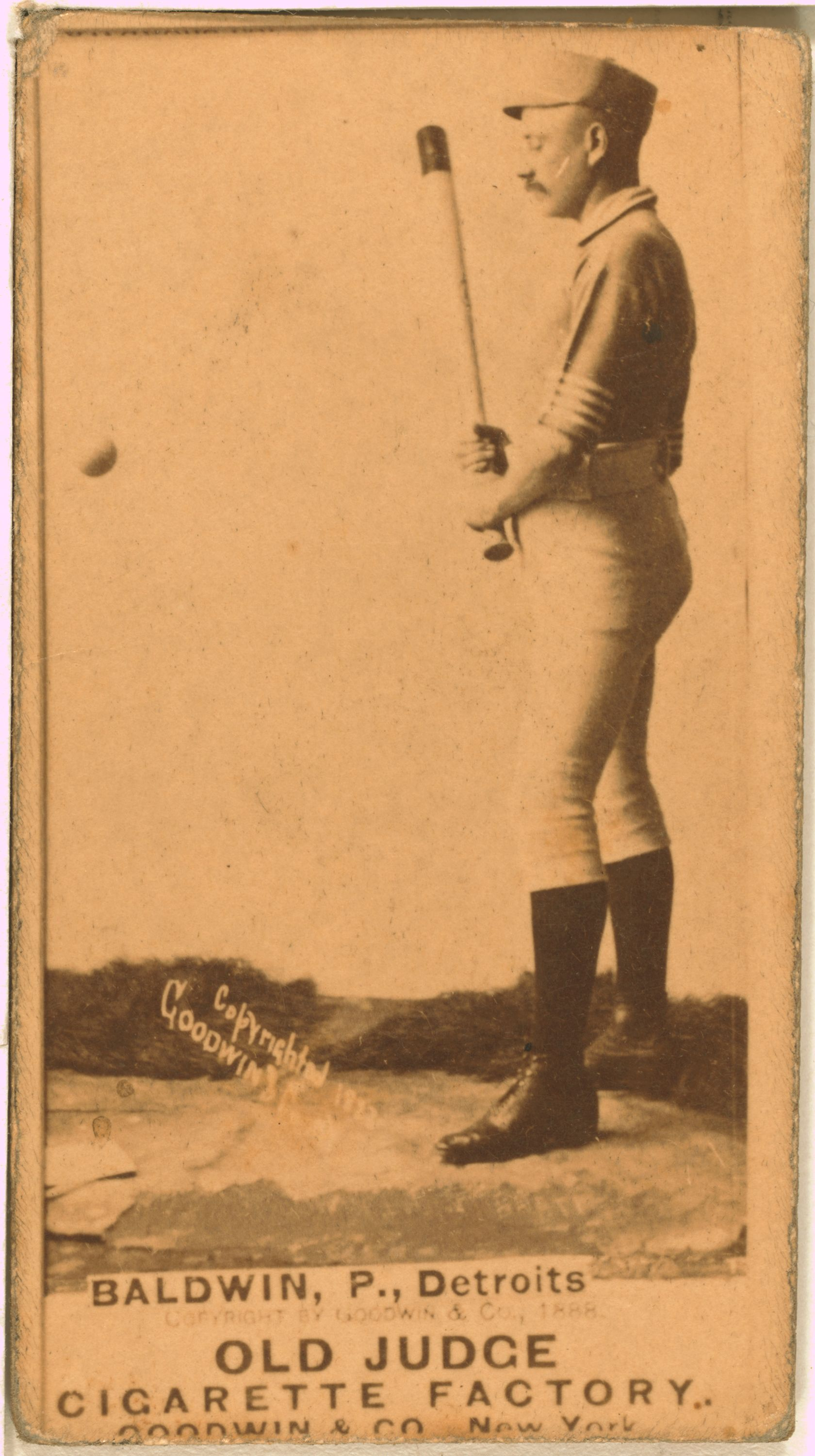
Lady Baldwin was the Wolverines' Opening Day starting pitcher in 1886 and in 1887, the year they won the World Series.

| Season | Pitcher | Decision | Final Score | Opponent | Location (Stadium) | References |
|---|---|---|---|---|---|---|
| 1881 | George Derby | L | 5–6 | Buffalo Bisons | Recreation Park | |
| 1882 | George Derby (2) | (W) | 5–4 | Cleveland Blues | National League Park | |
| 1883 | Stump Weidman | (L) | 4–7 | Chicago White Stockings | Recreation Park | |
| 1884 | Stump Weidman (2) | (L) | 2–13 | Philadelphia Quakers | Recreation Park | |
| 1885 | Stump Weidman (3) | W | 8–3 | Buffalo Bisons | Recreation Park | |
| 1886 | Lady Baldwin | (W) | 9–2 | St. Louis Maroons | Union Grounds | |
| 1887† | Lady Baldwin (2) | W | 4–3 | Indianapolis Hoosiers | Seventh Street Park | |
| 1888 | Charlie Getzien | (L) | 2–5 | Pittsburgh Alleghenys | Recreation Park | |
