= Alex Ferson =

American baseball player (1866–1957)

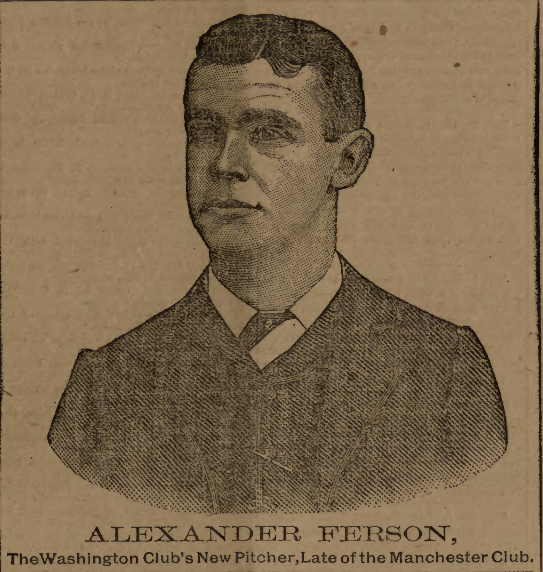
- Pitcher
- Born: July 14, 1866; Philadelphia, Pennsylvania, U.S.
- Died: December 5, 1957 (aged 91); Boston, Massachusetts, U.S.
- Batted: Right Threw: Right

MLB debut
- May 4, 1889, for the Washington Nationals

Last MLB appearance
- July 25, 1892, for the Baltimore Orioles

MLB statistics
- Win–loss record: 18-25
- Earned run average: 4.37
- Strikeouts: 106
- Stats at Baseball Reference

Teams
- Washington Nationals (1889); Buffalo Bisons (1890); Baltimore Orioles (1892)

Alexander "Colonel" Ferson (July 14, 1866 – December 5, 1957) was a 5'9", 165 pound American right-handed baseball pitcher who played from 1889 to 1890 and in 1892 for the Washington Nationals, Buffalo Bisons and Baltimore Orioles.

Ferson began his big league career on May 4, 1889. That year, he went 17–17 with a 3.90 ERA in 36 games (34 starts, 28 complete games). Despite finishing 10th in the league in hits allowed (319), ninth in the league in losses and eighth in the league in hit batsmen, he was still the best pitcher on the team overall. Although the team finished last in the league with a 41–83 record (.331 winning percentage), Ferson managed a winning percentage of exactly .500. Furthermore, he was the only pitcher on the team with at least one decision to finish with a winning percentage of .500 or better (in contrast, George Haddock went 11-19 for a .367 winning percentage, George Keefe went 8-18 for a .308 winning percentage, Hank O'Day went 2-10 for a .167 winning percentage and Egyptian Healy went 1-11 for a .083 winning percentage). Ferson also had the best ERA of any pitcher with at least two appearances, and he made the most appearances, games started, and he pitched the most innings.

The rest of Ferson's career didn't really pan out for him. In fact, for the Bisons in 1890, he went 1–7 with a 5.45 ERA in 10 starts. For the Orioles in 1892, he went 0–1 in 2 games (1 start), posting an ERA of 11.00. He played his final game on July 25, 1892.

Overall, Ferson went 18–25 in his three-year career, posting an ERA of 4.37. He made 48 appearances, starting 45 of them, completing 36 of his starts and shutting out one of his complete games. According to the Similarity Scores at Baseball-Reference.com, Ferson is most similar statistically to Rick Matula and Parke Swartzel.

A poor hitter, Ferson hit .133 in 150 career at-bats.

After his death, he was buried in Saint Joseph (old) cemetery in Manchester, New Hampshire.
