= William Halligan =

William Halligan may refer to:

- William Halligan (actor), American stage and film actor
- Billy Halligan, Irish association football player
- William J. Halligan, founder in 1932 of Hallicrafters, a manufacturer of radio equipment
- Jocko Halligan (William E. Halligan), American baseball player
