= George Bignell =

American baseball player (1858–1925)

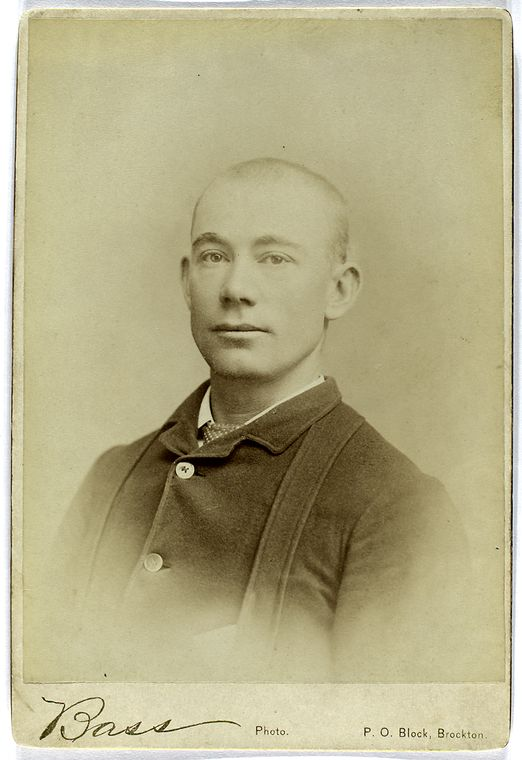
- Catcher
- Born: July 18, 1858; Taunton, Massachusetts, U.S.
- Died: January 16, 1925 (aged 66); Providence, Rhode Island, U.S.
- Batted: Unknown Threw: Unknown

MLB debut
- September 27, 1884, for the Milwaukee Brewers

Last MLB appearance
- October 5, 1884, for the Milwaukee Brewers

MLB statistics
- Batting average: .222
- Home runs: 0
- Hits: 2
- Stats at Baseball Reference

Teams
- Milwaukee Brewers (1884)

George William Bignell (July 18, 1858 – January 16, 1925) was an American Major League Baseball player. He played four games for the Milwaukee Brewers of the Union Association in 1884.

== Sources ==
- Career statistics from Baseball Reference · Baseball Reference (Minors) · Retrosheet · Baseball Almanac
