= Tom Sexton (baseball) =

American baseball player (1865–1934)

- Shortstop
- Born: March 14, 1865; Rock Island, Illinois
- Died: February 8, 1934 (aged 68); Rock Island, Illinois
- Batted: Left Threw: Unknown

MLB debut
- September 27, 1884, for the Milwaukee Brewers

Last MLB appearance
- October 12, 1884, for the Milwaukee Brewers

MLB statistics
- Batting average: .234
- Home runs: 0
- Hits: 11
- Stats at Baseball Reference

Teams
- Milwaukee Brewers (1884)

Thomas William Sexton (March 14, 1865 – February 8, 1934) was a Major League Baseball player. He played twelve games for the Milwaukee Brewers of the Union Association in 1884. He played from 1883-1887 in the Northwestern League.

== Sources ==
- Career statistics from Baseball Reference
