= Earlville, Illinois =

Earlville
- City
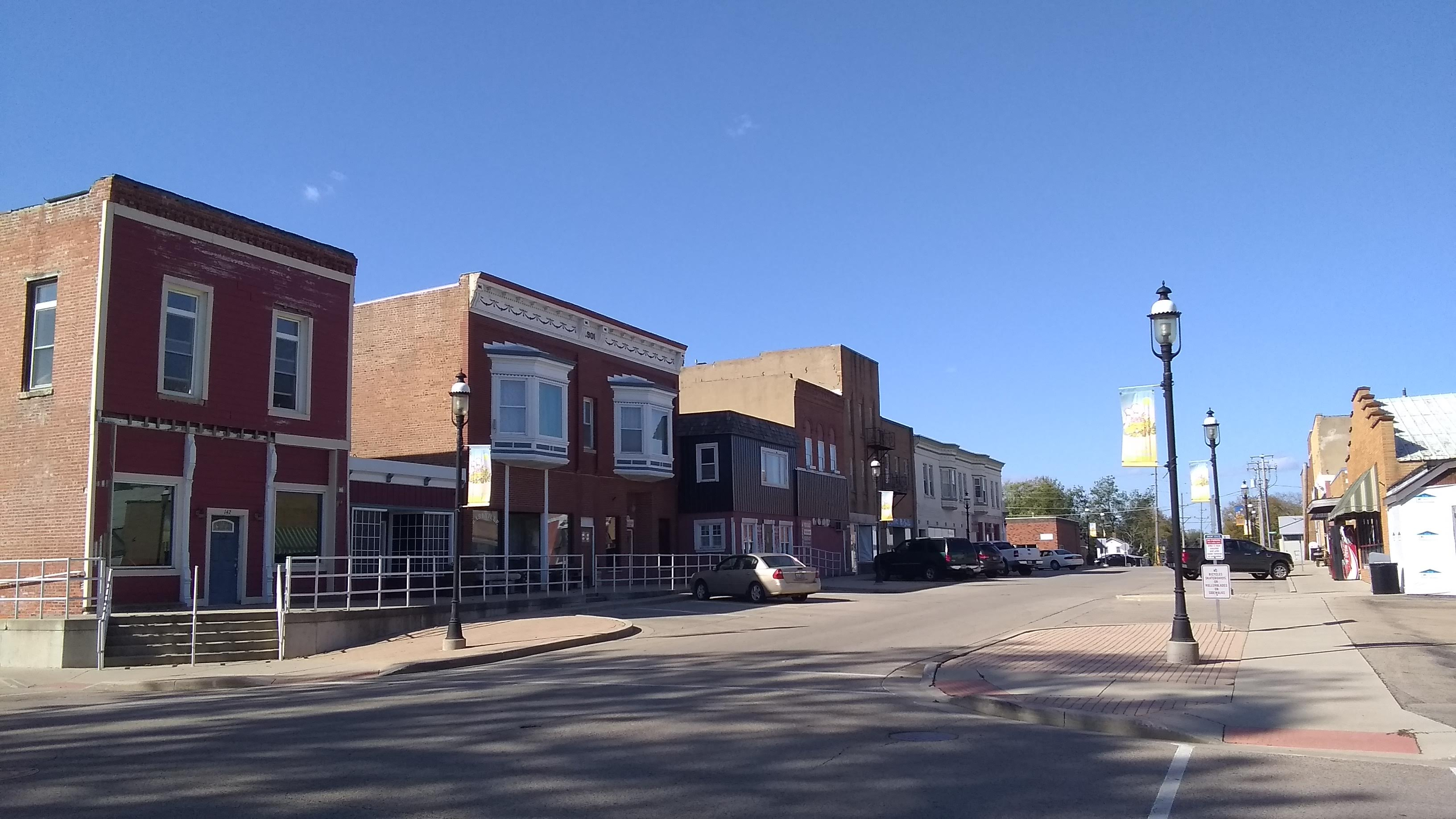
- Downtown Earlville in 2021

- Location of Earlville in LaSalle County, Illinois.
- Coordinates: 41°35′17″N 88°55′23″W
- Country: United States
- State: Illinois
- County: LaSalle
- Township: Earl
- Settled: 1834
- Incorporated: 1863

Government
  - Type: Mayor–council

Area
  - Total: 1.20 sq mi (3.11 km^{2})
  - Land: 1.20 sq mi (3.11 km^{2})
  - Water: 0 sq mi (0.00 km^{2})
- Elevation: 702 ft (214 m)

Population (2020)
  - Total: 1,613
  - Density: 1,342.5/sq mi (518.36/km^{2})
- Time zone: UTC-6 (CST)
  - Summer (DST): UTC-5 (CDT)
- ZIP code: 60518
- Area code: 815
- GNIS ID: 2394593
- FIPS code: 17-21540
- Website: earlvilleil.org

Earlville is a city in LaSalle County, Illinois, United States. The population was 1,613 at the 2020 census, down from 1,701 at the 2010 census. The city is part of the Ottawa, IL Micropolitan Statistical Area.

== History ==
The Earlville Post Office has been in operation since 1844.

== Geography ==
Earlville has a total area of 1.2 square miles (3.11 km^{2}), all land. Indian Creek, a small tributary of the Fox River runs through the middle of town.

== Demographics ==
Historical population
Census	Pop.	Note	%±
1880	963		—
1890	1,058		9.9%
1900	1,122		6.0%
1910	1,059		−5.6%
1920	1,012		−4.4%
1930	1,028		1.6%
1940	1,103		7.3%
1950	1,217		10.3%
1960	1,420		16.7%
1970	1,410		−0.7%
1980	1,382		−2.0%
1990	1,435		3.8%
2000	1,778		23.9%
2010	1,701		−4.3%
2020	1,613		−5.2%
U.S. Decennial Census

=== 2020 census ===
As of the 2020 census, Earlville had a population of 1,613. The population density was 1,343.05 inhabitants per square mile (518.55/km^{2}). The median age was 40.6 years. 22.1% of residents were under the age of 18 and 16.6% were 65 years of age or older. For every 100 females, there were 99.4 males, and for every 100 females age 18 and over, there were 101.3 males.

0.0% of residents lived in urban areas, while 100.0% lived in rural areas.

There were 680 households, of which 28.1% had children under the age of 18 living in them. Of all households, 45.9% were married-couple households, 20.4% were households with a male householder and no spouse or partner present, and 24.7% were households with a female householder and no spouse or partner present. About 29.0% of all households were made up of individuals, and 11.2% had someone living alone who was 65 years of age or older.

There were 743 housing units, of which 8.5% were vacant. The homeowner vacancy rate was 2.9% and the rental vacancy rate was 8.2%.

Racial composition as of the 2020 census
Race	Number	Percent
White	1,465	90.8%
Black or African American	6	0.4%
American Indian and Alaska Native	5	0.3%
Asian	5	0.3%
Native Hawaiian and Other Pacific Islander	0	0.0%
Some other race	53	3.3%
Two or more races	79	4.9%
Hispanic or Latino (of any race)	133	8.2%

=== Income and poverty ===
The median income for a household in the city was $52,768, and the median income for a family was $70,603. Males had a median income of $40,804 versus $19,375 for females. The per capita income for the city was $23,334. About 5.5% of families and 11.5% of the population were below the poverty line, including 9.0% of those under age 18 and 7.2% of those age 65 or over.

Earlville has a modern library, a K-12 school system, a bank, an ambulance and fire station, a weekly newspaper, a drive-in movie theater, and a number of local businesses. The area surrounding Earlville is strongly agricultural. Earlville lacks major shopping centers and industries.

Many of the inhabitants of Earlville work at blue-collar jobs. Earlville's population has declined somewhat over the past two decades. Several planned residential developments of moderate size were derailed by the nationwide housing crash that began in 2008.

== Education ==
Earlville Community Unit School District #9 (CUSD #9) occupies a campus of school buildings on Union Street, a main thoroughfare and former route of US 34. The school has undergone many changes over the last several years, including the recent implementation of a new air conditioning system and re-doing of one of the gyms for the 2021–2022 school year. The campus includes Earlville Grade School, Earlville Junior High, and Earlville High School. The administrative offices are within buildings on the site, which the Elementary, Junior High, and High School share. On the site is also a cafeteria, 2 gymnasiums, and library. The school Mascot is a Raider, stylized as a Pirate, with the school colors of Red and White. The School is a part of the Little Ten Conference, which includes Earlville, Serena, Newark, Indian Creek (Shabbona/Waterman), DePue, Leland, Somonauk, LaMoille, Kirkland Hiawatha, Hinckley Big Rock, and most recently IMSA. Earlville and Leland merged athletic programs in 2006, but separated again in 2018 after failing to come to an agreement regarding the co-op.

== Notable people ==
- Steve Behel, MLB player for the Milwaukee Brewers and New York Mets
- Herbert O. Crisler, head football coach and athletic director at University of Michigan
- Frank Haven Hall, inventor of the Hall Braille Writer
- Bessie S. McColgin, Oklahoma state representative
- John J. Myers, Roman Catholic Archbishop of Newark, N.J
- Gary K. Wolf, author of the novel Who Censored Roger Rabbit?, which became the Movie Who Framed Roger Rabbit
