= Thomas Griffin (baseball) =

American baseball player (1857–1933)

- First baseman
- Born: January 1857; Titusville, Pennsylvania, U.S.
- Died: April 17, 1933 (aged 76); Rockford, Illinois, U.S.
- Batted: Unknown Threw: Unknown

MLB debut
- September 27, 1884, for the Milwaukee Brewers

Last MLB appearance
- October 11, 1884, for the Milwaukee Brewers

MLB statistics
- Games played: 11
- Batting average: .220
- Runs batted in: 0
- Stats at Baseball Reference

Teams
- Milwaukee Brewers (1884)

Thomas William Griffin (January 1857 – April 17, 1933) was an American Major League Baseball player. He played eleven games for the Milwaukee Brewers of the Union Association in 1884. Prior to his stint in the UA, he played on Milwaukee's Northwestern League team.

== Sources ==
- Career statistics from Baseball Reference · Retrosheet · Baseball Almanac
