= Houcktown, Ohio =

Houcktown North Liberty
- Unincorporated community
- Location of Houcktown within the state of Ohio Houcktown (the United States)
- Coordinates: 40°56′07″N 83°35′39″W
- Country: USA
- State: Ohio
- County: Hancock County
- Founder: Jacob F. Houck

Houcktown is an unincorporated community in Hancock County, in the U.S. state of Ohio.

== History ==
Houcktown was originally called North Liberty, and under the latter name was platted in 1853 by Jacob F. Houck. A post office called Houcktown was established in 1862, and remained in operation until 1903.

Houcktown is the birthplace of baseball player Dummy Hoy. On April 5, 2022 a historic marker in Houcktown was dedicated to Dummy Hoy.
