= Anton Falch =

American baseball player (1860–1936)

- Outfielder/Catcher
- Born: December 4, 1860; Milwaukee, Wisconsin, U.S.
- Died: March 31, 1936 (aged 75); Wauwatosa, Wisconsin, U.S.
- Batted: Unknown Threw: Unknown

MLB debut
- September 30, 1884, for the Milwaukee Brewers

Last MLB appearance
- October 10, 1884, for the Milwaukee Brewers

MLB statistics
- Batting average: .111
- Home runs: 0
- Hits: 2
- Stats at Baseball Reference

Teams
- Milwaukee Brewers (1884)

Anton C. Falch (December 4, 1860 – March 31, 1936) was an American Major League Baseball player. He played five games for the Milwaukee Brewers of the Union Association in 1884, three in left field and two at catcher. He went 2-for-18 at the plate for a batting average of .111.

== Sources ==
- Career statistics from Baseball Reference · Baseball Reference (Minors) · Retrosheet · Baseball Almanac
