= Lady Baldwin =

American baseball player (1859–1937)

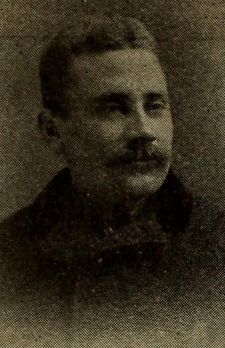
- Pitcher
- Born: April 8, 1859; Oramel, New York, U.S.
- Died: March 7, 1937 (aged 77); Hastings, Michigan, U.S.
- Batted: Right Threw: Left

MLB debut
- September 30, 1884, for the Milwaukee Brewers

Last MLB appearance
- June 26, 1890, for the Buffalo Bisons

MLB statistics
- Win–loss record: 73–41
- Earned run average: 2.85
- Strikeouts: 582
- Stats at Baseball Reference

Teams
- Milwaukee Brewers (1884); Detroit Wolverines (1885–1888); Brooklyn Bridegrooms (1890); Buffalo Bisons (1890)

Career highlights and awards
- NL wins leader (1886); NL strikeout leader (1886)

Charles B. "Lady" Baldwin (April 8, 1859 – March 7, 1937) was an American left-handed pitcher. He played six seasons in Major League Baseball with the Milwaukee Brewers (1884), Detroit Wolverines (1885–1888), Brooklyn Bridegrooms (1890), and Buffalo Bisons (1890).

Baldwin had his best season in 1886 when he compiled a 42–13 record and a 2.24 earned run average (ERA), threw 55 complete games, and led the National League with 323 strikeouts. Baldwin's 42 wins in 1886 set the major league record for a left-handed pitcher and remains the second highest single season total by a southpaw. Baldwin also pitched five complete games for a 4–1 record and a 1.50 ERA in the 1887 World Series. Arm troubles cut short Baldwin's major league career at age 31.

== Early years ==
Baldwin was born in 1859 in Oramel, Allegany County, New York, approximately 60 miles southeast of Buffalo. His father, Samuel Baldwin, was a farmer. As a boy, he moved with his family to Barry County in western Michigan, first to Johnstown Township and then to Hastings.

Baldwin was introduced to baseball in Hastings and began his pitching career for the Hastings team. His battery-mate on the Hastings team was Deacon McGuire, with whom he would later play as a member of the Detroit Wolverines.

== Professional baseball career ==
=== Grand Rapids ===
Baldwin began his professional baseball career in 1883 playing for the Grand Rapids, Michigan, team in the Northwestern League.

=== Milwaukee Brewers ===
In 1884, at age 25, Baldwin played for the Milwaukee Brewers of the Northwestern League. He compiled a 9–10 record in 22 games in the Northwestern League despite having an impressive 1.17 earned run average (ERA). The Northwestern League disbanded during the 1884 season, and the Brewers became part of the Union Association, considered a major league, toward the end of the season. Baldwin made his major league debut with the Brewers on September 30, 1884. He compiled a 1–1 record and 2.65 ERA in two games in the Union Association.

In 1885, the Brewers became members of the Western Association. Baldwin pitched impressively for the Brewers in 1885, compiling an 11–4 record and a 0.68 ERA in 16 games.

=== Nickname ===
Baldwin was given the nickname "Lady" because of his "quiet ways" and his refusal to swear or to come into contact with either tobacco or liquor.

=== Detroit Wolverines ===
During the 1885 season, Baldwin was acquired by the Detroit Wolverines of the National League. He appeared in 21 games for Detroit in 1885 and, despite an impressive 1.86 ERA, managed only an 11–9 record for a team that finished in sixth place with a 41–67 record. Baldwin led the National League in walks plus hits per inning pitched (0.92) and in strikeouts per nine innings pitched (6.775), and he was the only pitcher on the 1885 Detroit team to compile a winning record.

In 1886, the Wolverines acquired "The Big Four" (Dan Brouthers, Deacon White, Hardy Richardson, and Jack Rowe) from Buffalo and improved to second place and an 87–36 record. Baldwin accounted for nearly half of Detroit's victories in 1886. He compiled a record of 42–13 with a 2.24 ERA in 487 innings pitched, striking out 323 of 1,936 batters faced. Baldwin also completed 55 of 56 games, seven of which were via shutout. One of Baldwin's complete games in 1886 was a 3–0, 14-inning victory over the Philadelphia Phillies. Another was a one-hitter against Washington in June 1886 in which he struck out 13 batters.

Baldwin's 42 wins in 1886 set a major league record for a left-handed pitcher and remains the second highest single season total by a southpaw. Baldwin was also "reputed to be the first southpaw hurler to master the curve."

In 1887, the Wolverines won the National League pennant and the 1887 World Series. However, a shoulder injury sidelined Baldwin during the season, and he was "sent home without pay" in late July. Baldwin rejoined the Wolverines in August, and after resting his arm, won seven of his last eight games. Baldwin appeared in only 24 games in 1887 (down from 56 in 1886) and compiled a 13–10 record and a 3.84 ERA. The heaviest load for the 1887 team was handled by Charlie Getzien who compiled a 29–13 record. However, in the World Series, Baldwin pitched five complete games for a 4–1 record and a 1.50 ERA.

Baldwin was also a strong hitting pitcher. During Detroit's 1887 championship year, Baldwin compiled a respectable .271 batting average and a .354 on-base percentage.

In 1888, Baldwin was able to play in only six games. According to some sources, his pitching arm was "dead" from overwork in the three prior seasons. He compiled a 3–3 record in 1888, but saw his ERA balloon to 5.43—nearly 300% higher than his ERA of 1.86 just three years earlier.

Ned Hanlon, who played with Baldwin in Detroit, later said of Baldwin: "I will not hesitate in saying that 'Lady' Baldwin was the best left-handed pitcher of his day and one of the best that ever stood in the box. He had wonderful command, speed and curves, and knew how to work the batters."

=== Brooklyn and Buffalo ===
Baldwin attempted a comeback in 1890. He split the 1890 season between the Brooklyn Bridegrooms of the National League and the Buffalo Bisons of the Players' League. He compiled a 3–5 record and 4.78 ERA in nine games for the two teams. He appeared in his final major league game on June 26, 1890, and was released by Buffalo in early July 1890.

== Family and later years ==
By 1890, Baldwin had returned to his hometown of Hastings, Michigan, and taken up farming. At the time of the 1900 Census, Baldwin was living in Hastings with his wife Dora E. Baldwin. He remained in Hastings for the remainder of his life and became a successful orchard owner and farmer. In 1910, he was seriously injured when he fell from a hay mow, breaking his collarbone. The injury deprived Baldwin of the full use of his right arm, and he underwent surgery at the University of Michigan Hospital to correct the problem. In 1914, he was again seriously injured after falling from a ladder and was unable to walk for months. He later went into the real estate business in Hastings.

Baldwin died in 1937 after an illness of six months at age 77. He was buried in Riverside Cemetery in Hastings.

== See also ==
- 1887 Detroit Wolverines season
- List of Major League Baseball annual shutout leaders
- List of Major League Baseball annual strikeout leaders
- List of Major League Baseball annual wins leaders
