= Steve Behel =

American baseball player (1860–1945)

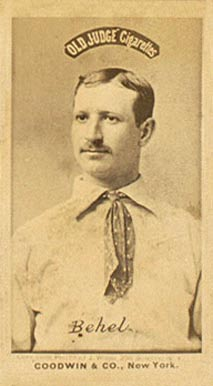
- Outfielder
- Born: November 6, 1860; Earlville, Illinois, U.S.
- Died: February 15, 1945 (aged 84); Los Angeles, California, U.S.
- Batted: Unknown Threw: Unknown

MLB debut
- September 27, 1884, for the Milwaukee Brewers

Last MLB appearance
- August 26, 1886, for the New York Metropolitans

MLB statistics
- Batting average: .210
- Home runs: 0
- Hits: 54
- Stats at Baseball Reference

Teams
- Milwaukee Brewers (1884); New York Metropolitans (1886)

Stephen Arnold Douglas Behel (November 6, 1860 – February 15, 1945) was an American Major League Baseball player.

== Career ==
He played nine games for the Milwaukee Brewers of the Union Association in 1884 and fifty-nine games for the New York Metropolitans of the American Association in 1886. He also played for a number of minor league teams, primarily in the Northwestern League, between 1883 and 1888.

== Sources ==
- Career statistics from Baseball Reference · Baseball Reference (Minors) · Retrosheet · Baseball Almanac
