= Mortimer Hogan =

American baseball player (1862–1923)

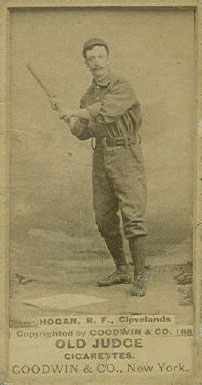
- Baseball card of Hogan
- Outfielder
- Born: February 1862; Illinois, U.S.
- Died: March 17, 1923 (aged 61); Chicago, Illinois, U.S.
- Batted: Right Threw: Right

MLB debut
- September 27, 1884, for the Milwaukee Brewers

Last MLB appearance
- October 17, 1888, for the Cleveland Blues

MLB statistics
- Batting average: .207
- Home runs: 0
- Runs batted in: 29
- Stats at Baseball Reference

Teams
- Milwaukee Brewers (1884); New York Metropolitans (1887); Cleveland Blues (1888)

Mortimer Edward Hogan (February 1862 – March 17, 1923) was an American outfielder in Major League Baseball. He started his professional career in 1883 with the Peoria Reds. He played in the Union Association in 1884 and in the American Association in 1887–1888.

== Sources ==
- Career statistics from Baseball Reference · Baseball Reference (Minors) · Retrosheet · Baseball Almanac
