= Jim Gillespie (baseball) =

American baseball player (1862–1926)

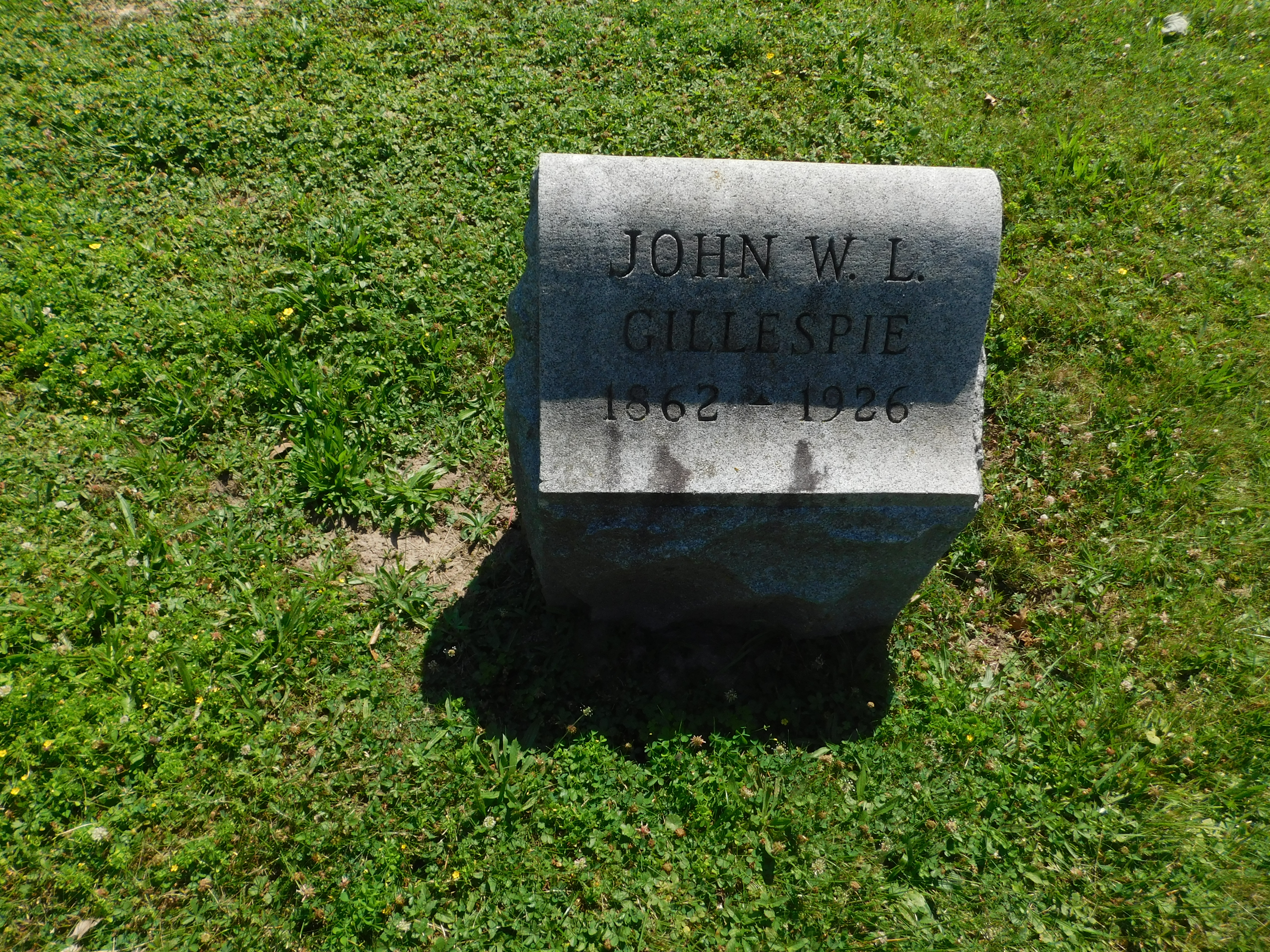
- Gillespie's grave at Forest Lawn Cemetery
- Right fielder
- Born: May 1862; Buffalo, New York, U.S.
- Died: June 24, 1926 (aged 64); Buffalo, New York, U.S.
- Batted: Switch Threw: Right

MLB debut
- October 1, 1890, for the Buffalo Bisons

Last MLB appearance
- October 1, 1890, for the Buffalo Bisons

MLB statistics
- Batting average: .000
- At bats: 3
- Errors: 3
- Stats at Baseball Reference

Teams
- Buffalo Bisons (1890)

John William Linden Gillespie (May 1862 – June 24, 1926) was an American Major League Baseball outfielder. He played one game in right field for the Buffalo Bisons of the Players' League in 1890. In that game, he had three at bats without a hit, and made three errors in four fielding chances.

== Sources ==
- Career statistics from Baseball Reference · Retrosheet · Baseball Almanac
