= John Rainey (baseball) =

American baseball player (1864–1912)

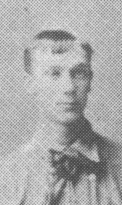
- Outfielder / Third baseman
- Born: July 16, 1864; Birmingham, Michigan, U.S.
- Died: November 11, 1912 (aged 48); Detroit, Michigan, U.S.
- Batted: Left Threw: Right

MLB debut
- August 25, 1887, for the New York Giants

Last MLB appearance
- July 29, 1890, for the Buffalo Bisons

MLB statistics
- Batting average: .250
- Home runs: 1
- Runs batted in: 32
- Stats at Baseball Reference

Teams
- New York Giants (1887); Buffalo Bisons (1890)

John Paul Rainey (July 16, 1864 – November 11, 1912) was an American Major League Baseball player who played for the 1887 New York Giants and 1890 Buffalo Bisons.
