= George Haddock (baseball) =

American baseball player (1866–1926)

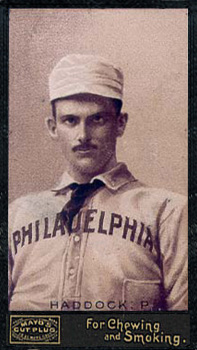
- Pitcher
- Born: December 25, 1866; Portsmouth, New Hampshire, U.S.
- Died: April 18, 1926 (aged 59); Boston, Massachusetts, U.S.
- Batted: Right Threw: Right

MLB debut
- September 27, 1888, for the Washington Nationals

Last MLB appearance
- September 20, 1894, for the Washington Senators

MLB statistics
- Win–loss record: 95–87
- Earned run average: 4.07
- Strikeouts: 599
- Stats at Baseball Reference

Teams
- Washington Nationals (1888–89); Buffalo Bisons (1890); Boston Reds (1891); Brooklyn Grooms (1892–93); Philadelphia Phillies (1894); Washington Senators (1894)

George Silas Haddock (December 25, 1866 – April 18, 1926), nicknamed Gentleman George, was a 19th-century American Major League Baseball pitcher. He played from 1888 to 1894 in the Players' League, American Association and National League. Haddock played right field for the Washington Nationals against the Cleveland Spiders, on September 4, 1889. He relieved George Keefe, who worked four innings as the Nationals' starting pitcher.
