= Dan Cotter =

American baseball player (1867–1935)

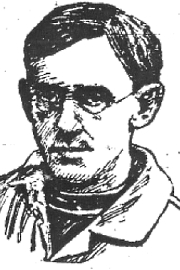
- Pitcher
- Born: April 14, 1867; Boston, Massachusetts, U.S.
- Died: September 4, 1935 (aged 68); Boston, Massachusetts, U.S.
- Batted: Right Threw: Right

MLB debut
- July 16, 1890, for the Buffalo Bisons

Last MLB appearance
- July 16, 1890, for the Buffalo Bisons

MLB statistics
- Win–loss record: 0–1
- Strikeouts: 0
- Earned run average: 14.00
- Stats at Baseball Reference

Teams
- Buffalo Bisons (1890)

Daniel Joseph Cotter (April 14, 1867 – September 4, 1935) was an American Major League Baseball pitcher who played with the Buffalo Bisons of the Players' League in 1890. Cotter played in one game for the Bisons on July 16, 1890. He pitched a complete game, but allowed 18 hits, 7 base on balls, and 14 earned runs. He also went hitless at the plate in four at bats. Buffalo lost the game 19–0. Cotter later played for the Lewiston, Maine ballclub of the New England League in 1892.
