= John Buckley (baseball) =

American baseball player (1870–1942)

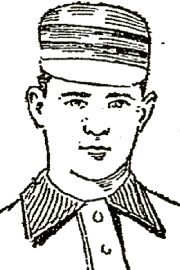
- Pitcher
- Born: March 20, 1870; Marlborough, Massachusetts, U.S.
- Died: May 3, 1942 (aged 72); Westborough, Massachusetts, U.S.
- Batted: Left Threw: Right

MLB debut
- July 15, 1890, for the Buffalo Bisons

Last MLB appearance
- July 25, 1890, for the Buffalo Bisons

MLB statistics
- Win–loss record: 1–3
- Earned run average: 7.68
- Strikeouts: 4
- Stats at Baseball Reference

Teams
- Buffalo Bisons (1890)

John Edward Buckley (March 20, 1870 – May 3, 1942) was an American Major League Baseball pitcher who played with the Buffalo Bisons of the Players' League in 1890.

== Baseball career ==
=== Early professional career ===
Buckley was born in Marlborough, Massachusetts. He made his professional baseball debut in 1887, playing with the Wilkes-Barre Coal Barons of the Pennsylvania State Association. He pitched in two games, finishing with a 1–1 win–loss record and a 3.60 earned run average. In 1890, he played for Joliet in the Illinois–Iowa League.

=== Major Leagues (1890) ===
On July 15, 1890, Buckley made his major league debut for the Buffalo Bisons of the Players' League. In his debut, the Bisons defeated the Boston Reds 12–9. He pitched in four games for Buffalo, pitching in 34.0 innings, striking out four batters, and collecting one win and three losses. His earned run average was 7.68. At the plate, Buckley had 15 at bats, and went hitless. He pitched in his final game for Buffalo on July 25.

=== Return to the Minor leagues ===
Buckley would play for several minor league baseball teams from 1891 to 1901. In 1891, he pitched for both the Peoria Distillers of the Northwestern League and the Milwaukee Brewers of the Western League. In 1895, 1896, and 1901, he played for the Pawtucket Phenoms, Bangor Millionaires, Portland and Augusta of the New England League. He died on March 3, 1942, in Westborough, Massachusetts and is buried at Immaculate Conception Cemetery in Marlborough.
