= Spider Clark =

American baseball player (1867–1892)

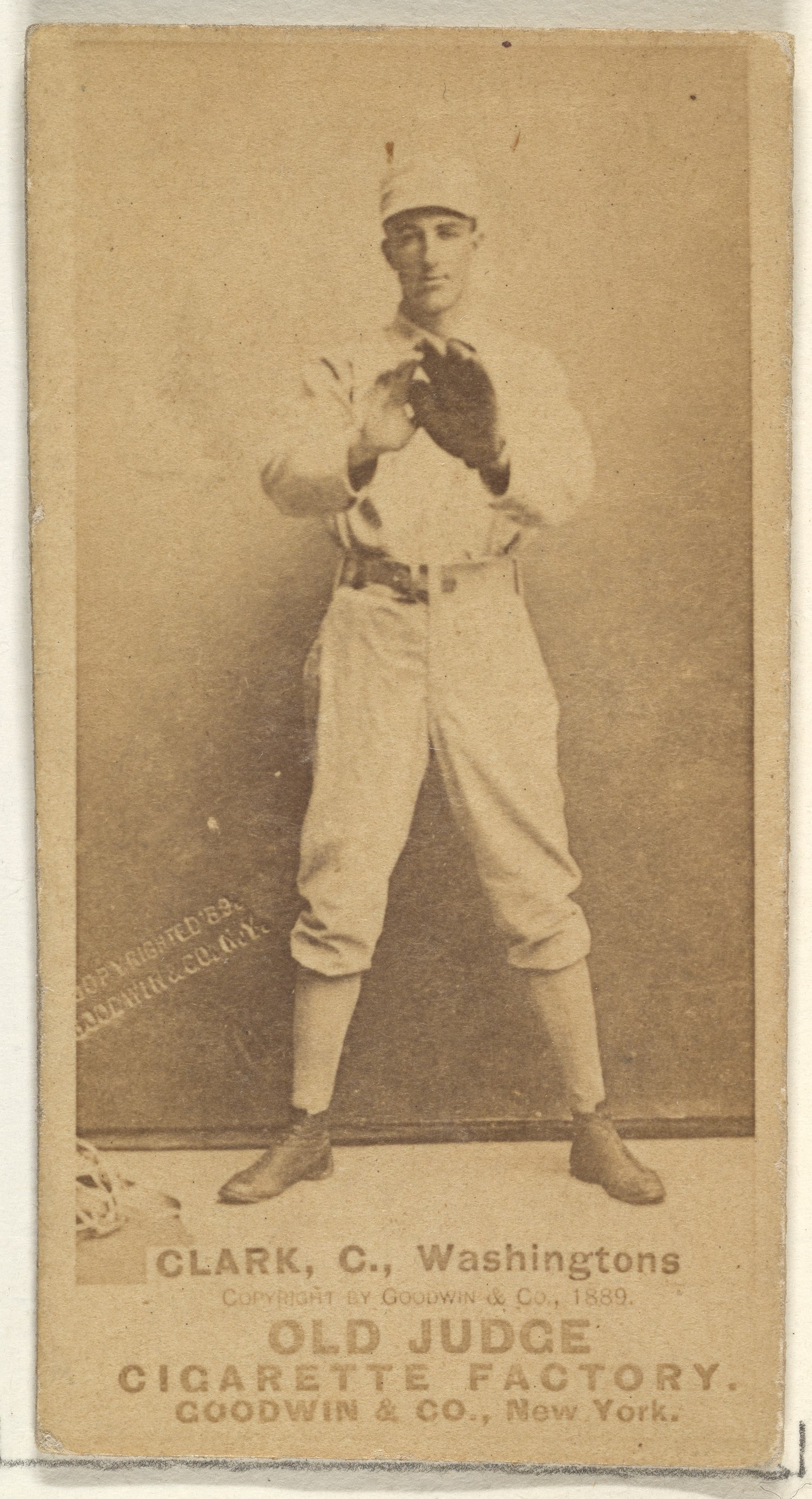
- Utility player
- Born: September 16, 1867; Brooklyn, New York, U.S.
- Died: February 8, 1892 (aged 24); Brooklyn, New York, U.S.
- Batted: Unknown Threw: Right

MLB debut
- May 2, 1889, for the Washington Nationals

Last MLB appearance
- October 4, 1890, for the Buffalo Bisons (PL)

MLB statistics
- Batting average: .262
- Home runs: 5
- Runs batted in: 47
- Stats at Baseball Reference

Teams
- Washington Nationals (1889); Buffalo Bisons (PL) (1890)

Owen F. "Spider" Clark (September 16, 1867 – February 8, 1892) was an American professional baseball player. He played two seasons in Major League Baseball (MLB): 1889 for the Washington Nationals of the National League and 1890 for the Buffalo Bisons of the Players' League. While he was primarily an outfielder, he played every position at least once, including one game as a pitcher for the Bisons. He was the first MLB player nicknamed "Spider."

Born and raised in Brooklyn, New York, Clark started playing professional baseball in 1887. Signed by the Nationals in 1889, he made his MLB debut on May 2. An injury to his catching hand limited his playing time, but he appeared in 38 games for the team, batting .255. The team ceased to exist after the 1889 season, but Clark joined the Bisons of the newly formed Players' League for 1890. According to Sporting Life, his skill as a first baseman made him a favorite of the fans. He appeared in 69 games with Buffalo, batting .265, but his second season would be his last. Diagnosed with tuberculosis in late 1890, he missed the 1891 season because of the disease and died of it on February 8, 1892.

== Early life ==
Owen F. Clark was born on September 16, 1867, in Brooklyn, New York. His parents had immigrated to the United States from Ireland. The young Clark loved playing baseball. He would play the game at actual playing fields in Brooklyn, as well as on the street. It was in these settings that he developed the skills that would help him one day to play at the major league level.

== Minor leagues (1887-88) ==
Clark began playing baseball professionally in 1887 with the Nashville Blues of the Southern League, though he only appeared in three games with them. In 1888, he played for two teams: the Manchester Maroons of the New England League as well as the Hazelton Pugilists of the Central League. Clark could play multiple positions, and spectators noticed that he appeared everywhere on the baseball diamond except on the pitcher's mound during his minor league career.

== Washington Nationals (1889) ==
The Washington Nationals, a team in the National League (NL), signed Clark for the 1889 season, putting him in the major leagues for the first time. He made his debut with the team on May 2. During the year, he was primarily used as a catcher, though he played in the outfield and at all the infield positions except for first base. It was as a catcher that he suffered a strange injury. According to the May 8, 1889 issue of Sporting Life:

A peculiar accident happened to catcher Owen Clark, of the Washingtons, at Staten Island [home of the New York Giants at the time] Thursday. He didn't know his hand had been split till his glove filled with blood. He wondered where the blood came from and, taking off the glove, discovered a gash between the third and little fingers.

The injury cost him playing time but did not keep him out for the rest of the season; Clark would play 38 games that season. He recorded a batting average of .255 with 19 runs scored, 37 hits, three home runs, 22 runs batted in, and eight stolen bases. With the Nationals in 1889, Clark also became the first major league player with the nickname of "Spider," a moniker he received because of his thin build and his excellent range as a fielder.

== Buffalo Bisons (1890) ==
After the 1889 season, the Nationals folded. In 1890, Clark signed with the Buffalo Bisons. This team participated in the newly created Players' League. Formed to challenge baseball's reserve clause, the league enticed players to join by promising them part ownership in the teams. It was formed in direct opposition to the NL; Buffalo was the only team not in a city that already had an NL team.

With Buffalo, Clark was used mostly as an outfielder, but he played every position at least once during the season, even pitching in one game. An August 9 story in Sporting Life related that "Owen Clark's first base playing has caught the crowds. He is deservedly a favorite." For the second year in a row, Clark injured his hand while catching, this time splitting a finger while facing the Cleveland Infants. However, he managed to get into 69 games for the Bisons, as opposed to 38 the year before. His last game with the ball club came on October 4. Clark batted .265 with 45 runs scored, 69 hits, two home runs, 25 RBI, and eight stolen bases.

== Death and career statistics ==
The Players' League went defunct after just one season, and the Bisons franchise followed suit. In late 1890, Clark was diagnosed with tuberculosis. This prevented him from playing for any team in 1891. He died of the disease on February 8, 1892, in Brooklyn. His grave is located at the Calvary Cemetery in Queens, New York.

Clark played 107 total games during his two seasons in the major leagues. He batted .262, with 64 runs scored, 106 hits, five home runs, 47 RBI, and 16 stolen bases.
