= Ed Beecher =

American baseball player (1860–1935)

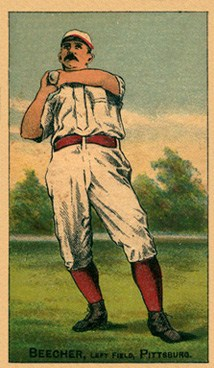
- Outfielder
- Born: July 2, 1860; Guilford, Connecticut, U.S.
- Died: September 12, 1935 (aged 75); Hartford, Connecticut, U.S.
- Batted: Left Threw: Left

MLB debut
- June 28, 1887, for the Pittsburgh Alleghenys

Last MLB appearance
- July 16, 1891, for the Philadelphia Athletics

MLB statistics
- Batting average: .273
- Home runs: 7
- Runs batted in: 177
- Stats at Baseball Reference

Teams
- Pittsburgh Alleghenys (1887); Washington Nationals (1889); Buffalo Bisons (1890); Washington Statesmen (1891); Philadelphia Athletics (1891)

Edward Harry Beecher (July 2, 1860 – September 12, 1935) was an American professional baseball player. He played as an outfielder in Major League Baseball between 1887 and 1891, for five teams in three leagues.

In 1887, Beecher played for the Pittsburgh Alleghenys of the National League. In 1889, he played for the NL's Washington Nationals. In 1890, he moved to the Players' League and the Buffalo Bisons. Finally, in 1891, he split the season between two American Association teams, the Washington Statesmen and the Philadelphia Athletics.

== Sources ==
- Career statistics from Baseball Reference · Baseball Reference (Minors) · Retrosheet · Baseball Almanac
