= Sam Wise =

American baseball player (1857–1910)

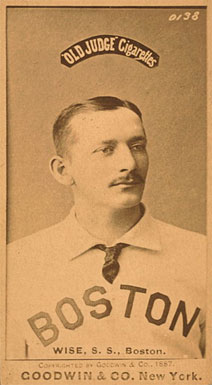
- Shortstop / Second baseman
- Born: August 18, 1857; Akron, Ohio, U.S.
- Died: January 22, 1910 (aged 52); Akron, Ohio, U.S.
- Batted: Left Threw: Right

MLB debut
- July 30, 1881, for the Detroit Wolverines

Last MLB appearance
- June 20, 1893, for the Washington Senators

MLB statistics
- Batting average: .272
- Home runs: 48
- Runs batted in: 672
- Stats at Baseball Reference

Teams
- Detroit Wolverines (1881); Boston Red Caps/Beaneaters (1882–1888); Washington Nationals (1889); Buffalo Bisons (1890); Baltimore Orioles (1891); Washington Senators (1893)

Samuel Washington Wise (August 18, 1857 – January 22, 1910) was an American professional baseball player. He played all or part of twelve seasons in Major League Baseball from 1881 to 1893, most often as either a shortstop or second baseman. He played for the Detroit Wolverines, Boston Red Caps (and later Beaneaters), and Washington Senators in the National League, the Baltimore Orioles in the American Association, and the Players' League Buffalo Bisons.

== Early life ==
Wise was born in Akron, Ohio, to two Pennsylvania natives, Samuel Wise and the former Sarah Weary.

== Career ==
Wise played semi-pro baseball in 1880 and 1881 for an Akron team organized by Charlie Morton, where his teammates included future major-league stars such as Bid McPhee and Tony Mullane. He played in a single NL game for the 1881 Detroit Wolverines. In 1882, Wise ended up signing with both the NL's Boston Red Caps and the American Association's Cincinnati Red Stockings. When the Red Stockings unsuccessfully sued the Red Caps, it marked the first American court case involving professional baseball.

Playing for Boston through 1888, Wise was mostly a left-handed hitter, but he sometimes batted right-handed on a whim. He became the first 100-strikeout hitter in the major leagues in 1884, and he was often erratic on defense, especially when throwing to first base. He sustained an injury in 1886, requiring a move to first base, and he had off-and-on arm difficulties for the rest of his career. Still, he had a stellar offensive season in 1887, hitting .334.

Wise spent 1889 with the Washington Nationals, but that team left the NL after the season, and most of its players went to the Buffalo Bisons of the Players' League (PL) in 1890. The PL lasted only one year and Wise was only in the major leagues until 1893.

Wise concluded his playing career by spending six seasons in the minor leagues, mostly with the Eastern League's team in Buffalo; the squad was managed by Morton. After retiring as a player, Wise worked for the Diamond Tire and Rubber Company and was a businessman in Buffalo for a short time before coming home to Akron. He umpired in the Ohio–Pennsylvania League, a minor league run by Morton.

== Personal life ==
In 1885 Samuel W. Wise fathered a son in Boston, MA with Irish-born Ellen McKenna. The child was named Samuel Henry Wise, but his name was revised on the birth record to John Francis Wise. John F. Wise became a Boston policeman in 1913 and participated in the 1919 Boston Police Strike. In 1887, Wise married the former Lizzie O'Neill of Utica, New York. He was known as a womanizer even after his marriage. Wise and Lizzie O'Neill had one child.

== Death ==
Wise was said to have sought medical treatments for appendicitis "for a long time". In January 1910, he became so ill that physicians recommended that he come to the hospital for surgery. The procedure was described as successful, but the Akron Beacon Journal said that "the after effects were worse than expected." Wise died at home on January 22 shortly after telling his wife that he had tried to be brave in fighting the illness.

== See also ==
- List of Major League Baseball career triples leaders
- List of Major League Baseball career stolen bases leaders
- List of Major League Baseball single-game hits leaders
