= Bert Cunningham =

American baseball player (1865–1952)

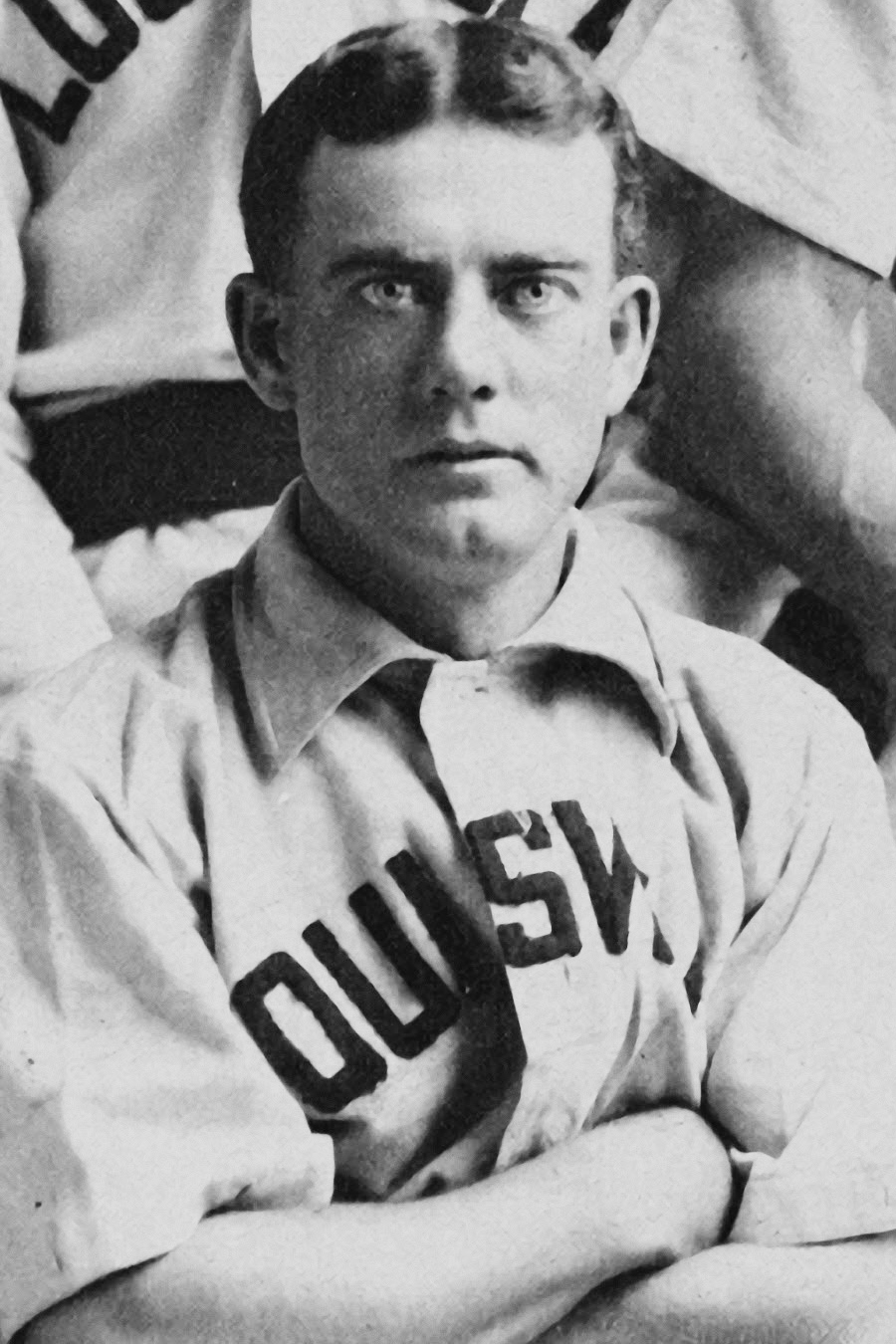
- Pitcher
- Born: November 25, 1865; Wilmington, Delaware, U.S.
- Died: May 14, 1952 (aged 86); Cragmere, Delaware, U.S.
- Batted: Right Threw: Right

MLB debut
- September 15, 1887, for the Brooklyn Grays

Last MLB appearance
- April 28, 1901, for the Chicago Orphans

MLB statistics
- Win–loss record: 142–167
- Earned run average: 4.22
- Strikeouts: 718
- Stats at Baseball Reference

Teams
- Brooklyn Grays (1887); Baltimore Orioles (1888–1889); Philadelphia Athletics (1890); Buffalo Bisons (1890); Baltimore Orioles (1891); Louisville Colonels (1895–1899); Chicago Orphans (1900–1901)

Ellsworth Elmer "Bert" Cunningham (November 25, 1865 – May 14, 1952), was an American Major League Baseball pitcher from 1887 to 1901. He played for the Brooklyn Grays, Baltimore Orioles, Philadelphia Athletics, Buffalo Bisons, Louisville Colonels, and Chicago Orphans.

On September 15, 1890, while playing for Buffalo in the Players' League, Cunningham threw five wild pitches in one inning. This record was tied in a 2000 playoff game by St. Louis Cardinals pitcher Rick Ankiel, but still stood in 2007.

In 1996, Cunningham was inducted into the Delaware Sports Museum and Hall of Fame.
