= Bill Duzen =

American baseball player (1870–1944)

- Pitcher
- Born: February 21, 1870; Buffalo, New York, U.S.
- Died: March 11, 1944 (aged 74); Buffalo, New York, U.S.
- Batted: Right Threw: Right

MLB debut
- September 21, 1890, for the Buffalo Bisons

Last MLB appearance
- September 27, 1890, for the Buffalo Bisons

MLB statistics
- Win–loss record: 0–2
- Strikeouts: 5
- Earned run average: 13.85
- Stats at Baseball Reference

Teams
- Buffalo Bisons (1890)

William George Duzen (February 21, 1870 – March 11, 1944) was an American Major League Baseball pitcher. He played in two games with the Buffalo Bisons in 1890.

Duzen was born in Buffalo, New York in 1870. On September 21, 1890, at the age of 20, he made his Players' League as a starting pitcher for the Buffalo Bisons. Duzen would pitch in a second game on September 27, the final game of his career. In his two career games, he lost both of his starts, gave up 20 earned runs in 13.0 innings, and struck out five batters.
