= Oramel, New York =

Hamlet in Allegany County, New York

Oramel is a hamlet in the township of Caneadea, Allegany County, New York, United States. It was previously an official village, but after the community underwent significant economic change, this status was abandoned.

== History ==
In 1812, the earliest non-native settlers arrived in the area, but it was not until 1856 that Oramel was officially founded as a village. Businessman Oramel Griffin had purchased a sizeable portion of land for the formation of the new community, and the village was named after him.

The Genesee Valley Canal was a major factor in the growth of Oramel. Construction of the canal was an arduous process that took many years. The canal reached the Oramel area in 1851, facilitating the growth of a booming economy. A variety of businesses including mercantile stores, hotels, taverns, and even a newspaper sprung up. The area had bountiful timber, and with eleven sawmills, it became Oramel's biggest export. Oramel was dubbed the "Syracuse of Western New York" and was thought to hold a promising future. After the canal reached Olean however, Oramel's importance and prosperity began to decline. The canal overall was very unprofitable for New York State, and was put out of commission in 1878, further contributing to Oramel's decline.

Oramel continued to dwindle. In 1906, most of its timber was gone, and the last sawmill closed. In 1925, its official village status was abandoned (though it is still today considered a "hamlet", a somewhat informal term). In 1937 a devastating fire destroyed many of the buildings in the already humble community.

== Geography ==
Oramel is located in the southern portion of the township of Caneadea.

== Places ==
Oramel Fire Department

Oakes Oramel Inn - a small motel

Oakes Automotive - a used car dealership

Genesee River - a river that flows northward to Lake Ontario

Genesee Valley Greenway - a recreational pathway that generally follows the old canal towpath
