= Jay Faatz =

American baseball player (1860–1923)

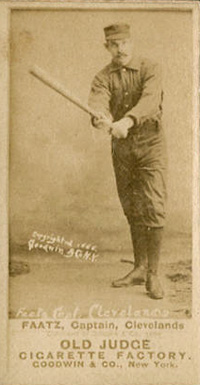
- First baseman
- Born: October 24, 1860; Weedsport, New York, U.S.
- Died: April 10, 1923 (aged 62); Syracuse, New York, U.S.
- Batted: Right Threw: Right

MLB debut
- August 22, 1884, for the Pittsburgh Alleghenys

Last MLB appearance
- September 10, 1890, for the Buffalo Bisons

MLB statistics
- Batting average: .241
- Runs batted in: 105
- Runs scored: 159
- Stats at Baseball Reference

Teams
- As player: Pittsburgh Alleghenys (1884); Cleveland Blues/Spiders (1888–1889); Buffalo Bisons (PL) (1890); As manager: Buffalo Bisons (PL) (1890)

Jayson S. Faatz (October 24, 1860 – April 10, 1923) was an American Major League Baseball player born in Weedsport, New York, who played at first base for three teams during his four-season career.

== Career ==
After his 1884 season, he returned to the minor leagues, which included one season with the Toledo Mud Hens in 1885. In his last season, he was named player-manager for a short time with the 1890 Buffalo Bisons of the Players' League, the only season in the league's existence.

After his baseball days were over, among Jay's post-career occupations included insurance salesman. Jay died in Syracuse, New York at the age of 62, and was buried in the Weedsport Rural Cemetery.
