= Dummy Hoy =

American baseball player (1862–1961)

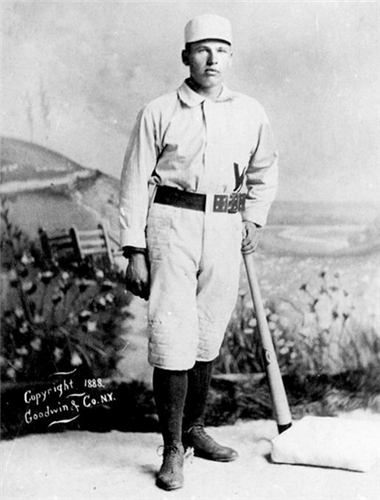
- Center fielder
- Born: May 23, 1862; Houcktown, Ohio, U.S.
- Died: December 15, 1961 (aged 99); Cincinnati, Ohio, U.S.
- Batted: Left Threw: Right

Major league debut
- April 20, 1888, for the Washington Nationals

Last major league appearance
- July 17, 1902, for the Cincinnati Reds

Major league statistics
- Batting average: .288
- Hits: 2,048
- Runs batted in: 725
- Stolen bases: 596
- Stats at Baseball Reference

Teams
- Washington Nationals (1888–1889); Buffalo Bisons (1890); St. Louis Browns (1891); Washington Senators (1892–1893); Cincinnati Reds (1894–1897); Louisville Colonels (1898–1899); Chicago White Sox (1901); Cincinnati Reds (1902)

Career highlights and awards
- NL stolen base leader (1888); Cincinnati Reds Hall of Fame

William Ellsworth "Dummy" Hoy (May 23, 1862 – December 15, 1961) was an American professional baseball center fielder who played, predominantly in the major leagues, for several teams from 1886 to 1903, most notably the Cincinnati Reds and two Washington, D.C. franchises.

Hoy is the most accomplished deaf player in major league history, and is credited by some sources with causing the establishment of signals for safe and out calls. He held the major league record for games in center field (1,726) from 1889 to 1902, set records for career putouts (3,958) and total chances (4,625) as an outfielder, and retired among the leaders in outfield games (2nd; 1,795), assists (7th; 273), and double plays (3rd; 72).

He was an excellent baserunner, scoring over 100 runs nine times, and often finishing among the top base stealers. He is one of only 29 baseball players to have played in four different major leagues. His 1,006 career walks put him second in major league history (behind Billy Hamilton) when he retired. He ended his career ranking eighth in career games played (1,796).

== Career ==
Born in the small town of Houcktown, Ohio, Hoy became deaf after meningitis at age three. He graduated from the Ohio Institution for the Deaf in Columbus as class valedictorian. He opened a shoe repair store in his hometown and played baseball on weekends, earning a professional contract in 1886 with an Oshkosh, Wisconsin, team which was managed by Frank Selee in 1887. In 1888, with the Washington Nationals of the National League, Hoy became the third deaf player in the major leagues, after pitcher Ed Dundon (also from Ohio) and pitcher Tom Lynch. In his rookie year, he led the league in stolen bases (although the statistic was defined differently prior to 1898), and also finished second with 69 walks while batting .274. At 5'4" and batting left-handed, he was able to gain numerous walks with a small strike zone, leading the league twice and compiling a .386 career on-base percentage.

Hoy's speed was a great advantage in the outfield, and he was able to play shallow as a result. On June 19, 1889, he set a major league record (which has since been tied twice) by throwing out three runners at home plate in one game, with catcher Connie Mack recording the outs. In 1890, he and Mack joined the Buffalo Bisons of the Players' League. In 1891, Hoy returned to the AA with the St. Louis Browns under player-manager Charles Comiskey for the league's final season, leading the league with 119 walks and scoring a career-high 136 runs (second in the league). He returned to Washington, D.C. for two years with the Senators of the National League. He was traded to the Cincinnati Reds in December 1893, where he reunited with Comiskey.

Hoy later joined the Louisville Colonels, where his teammates included Honus Wagner, Fred Clarke and Tommy Leach (his roommate). He hit .304 and .306 in his two seasons with the club. In 1899, he broke Mike Griffin's Major League record of 1,459 games in center field. After playing for the Chicago White Sox in the American League during its last minor league season (1900), where Comiskey was now the team owner, Hoy stayed with the team when the AL achieved major league status in 1901, helping them to the league's (and his) first pennant.

In 1901, Hoy broke Tom Brown's record of 3,623 career outfield putouts, and led the league with 86 walks and 14 times hit by pitch. He finished fourth in runs (112) and on-base percentage (.407). Hoy ended his Major League career with the Reds in 1902, batting .290 and breaking Brown's record of 4,461 career total chances in the outfield. In 1903, he played for the Los Angeles Angels of the Pacific Coast League. Later that year, Hoy played his final professional season for the Reds. On May 16, he batted against pitcher Dummy Taylor of the New York Giants in the first (and so far, only) faceoff between deaf players in the Major Leagues. Hoy got two hits.

Hoy retired with a .288 batting average, 2,048 hits, 1,429 runs, 725 runs batted in, 248 doubles, 121 triples and 40 home runs. He had 488 stolen bases from 1888 through 1897, and 108 more after the statistic was redefined to its present meaning in 1898. At that time, his 1,795 games in the outfield ranked second to Jimmy Ryan (1,829) in major league history. Jesse Burkett broke his major league record for career putouts in 1905, and Clarke topped his record for career total chances in 1909. His record for career games in center field was broken by Tris Speaker in 1920.

== Hand signals ==
In oral history, Hoy was remembered as inventing the system of hand signals to call balls and strikes. This was called into question by historian Stephen Jay Gould, who pointed out that Hoy retired in 1903 and the system was propagated in 1906; Gould's argument was repeated in Bill Deane's book Baseball Myths. In fact, although the system of hand signals was introduced during the 1906 World Series by umpire Silk O'Loughlin, it was universally recognized by reporters of the time as "Dummy Hoy’s mute signal code." O'Loughlin adopted Hoy's system during Game 3 due to a sore throat, then continued using it in the following three games since he found it useful when the crowd noise was overwhelming, leading to its true value being recognized for the first time.

Some sources report that other systems predate Hoy. Umpire Cy Rigler is believed to have created signals for balls and strikes while working in the minor leagues. In the November 6, 1886 issue of The Sporting News, the deaf pitcher Ed Dundon is credited as using hand signals while umpiring a game in Mobile, Alabama on October 20, 1886. Umpire Bill Klem is credited with introducing those signals to the Major Leagues in the early 20th century as well. Nonetheless, due to the possibility that Hoy may have played a role in the use of signals, as well as for his all-around play, there is a movement to support his election to the Baseball Hall of Fame in Cooperstown, New York.

== Personal life ==
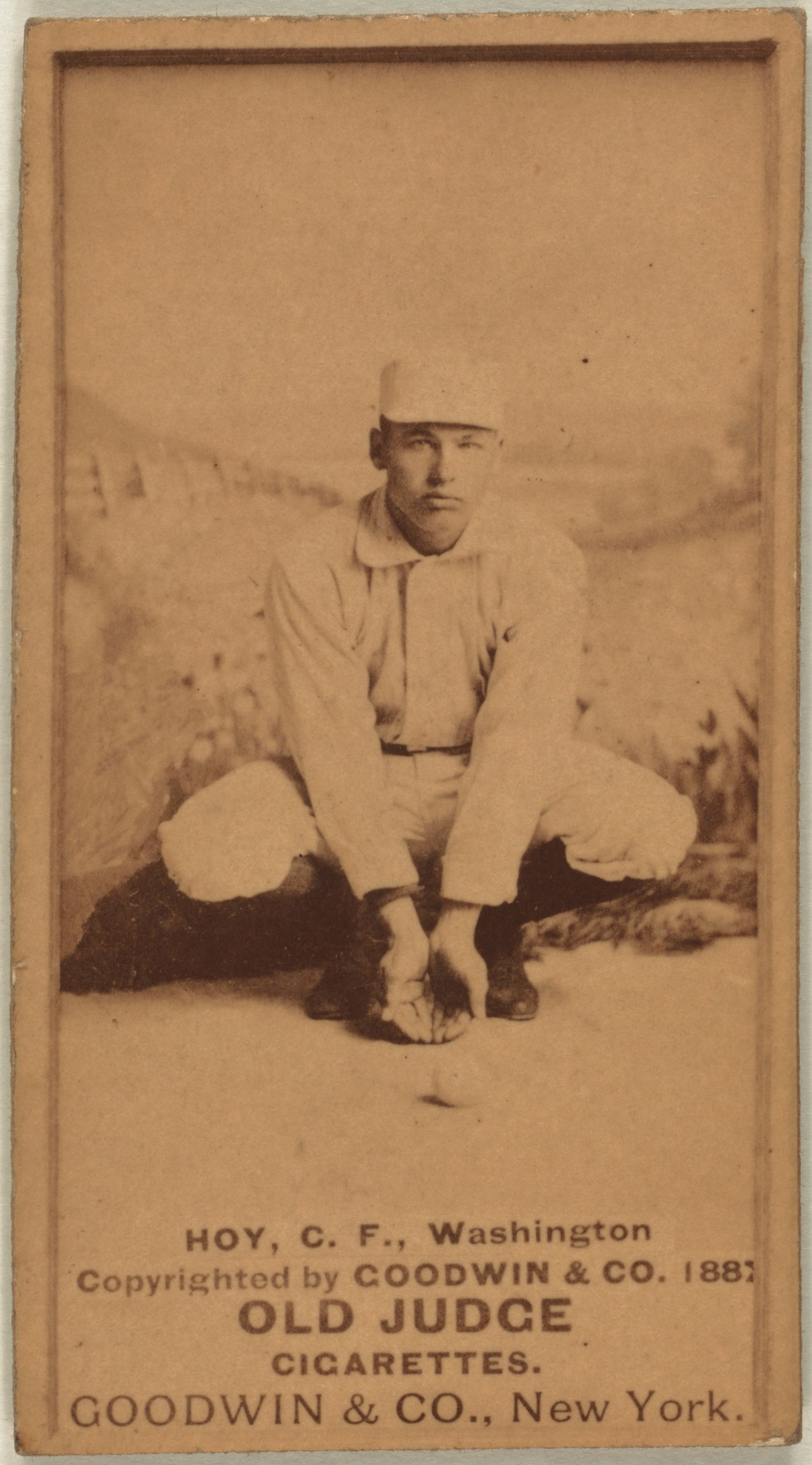
A baseball card of Hoy

In Hoy's time, the word "dumb" was used to describe someone who could not speak, rather than someone who was stupid. Since the ability to speak was often connected to one's intelligence, the epithets "dumb" and "dummy" became interchangeable with stupidity. Hoy himself often corrected individuals who addressed him as William, and referred to himself as Dummy. Said to have been able to speak with a voice that resembled a squeak, he was one of the most intelligent players of his time.

In retirement, Hoy and his wife Anna Maria, who was also deaf, operated a dairy farm in Mount Healthy, Ohio, outside Cincinnati. Among their six children was Carson, an Ohio judge, and their grandson, Judson, became a member of the Ohio House of Representatives. The Hoys raised Dummy's sister's son (nephew), Paul Hoy Helms, the founder of the Helms Athletic Foundation in Los Angeles. Hoy also worked as an executive with Goodyear after supervising hundreds of deaf workers during World War I.

In 1951, he was the first deaf athlete elected to membership in the American Athletic Association of the Deaf Hall of Fame. At the age of 99, and just two months before his death in Cincinnati following a stroke, the Reds brought him back to Crosley Field, built on the site of his former home field, to throw out the first ball before Game 3 of the 1961 World Series. He could see, if not hear, the standing ovation he received. Upon his death that December, his remains were cremated per family tradition and scattered at Lytle Park in Cincinnati.

== Legacy ==
Upon his death in 1961, at the age of 99, Hoy was the longest-lived former major league player. In 1973, Ralph Miller broke Hoy's record by becoming the first ex-major leaguer to reach the age of 100. Altogether, 25 former big league ballplayers have become centenarians. One of the 25, Silas Simmons, became a supercentenarian, dying at the age of 111 in 2006.

At the time of his death, Dummy Hoy was the last surviving participant of both the American Association and the Players' League.

In 2001, the baseball field at Gallaudet University was named the William "Dummy" Hoy Baseball Field. He was inducted into the Cincinnati Reds Hall of Fame in 2003. Hoy was also inducted into the Baseball Reliquary's Shrine of the Eternals in 2004. In 2018, he was selected as SABR's Overlooked 19th Century Baseball Legend.

The William "Dummy" Hoy Classic is a baseball game held every two years during Rochester, New York's Deaf Awareness Week; it is contested between members of the Rochester Recreation Club of the Deaf and the Buffalo, New York Club of the Deaf, in a recreated 19th-century ballpark at Genesee Country Village and Museum.

In 2008, the Documentary Channel aired the biography Dummy Hoy: A Deaf Hero (aka: I See the Crowd Roar). The documentary, using photographs of Hoy and actors to recreate certain events, chronicled the highlights of Hoy's life and his contributions to baseball; Hoy was portrayed by Ryan Lane.

At least three picture books for children have been published about his life: Silent Star: The Story of Deaf Major Leaguer William Hoy by Bill Wise (2012), The William Hoy Story: How a Deaf Baseball Player Changed the Game by Nancy Churnin (2016)., and The Little-Known Heroes: William 'Dummy' Hoy by Kaushay and Spencer Ford (2021).

Released in 2019, a limited-release movie, The Silent Natural, tells the story of Hoy, played by Miles Barbee, who is deaf in real life.

== Notes ==
Records
Preceded by John Leighton	Oldest recognized verified living baseball player October 31, 1956 – December 15, 1961	Succeeded by Buster Burrell
