= Tom Loftus =

American baseball player and manager (1856–1910)

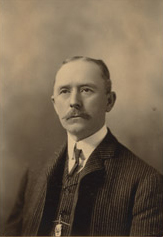
- Loftus in 1902
- Outfielder / Manager
- Born: November 15, 1856; St. Louis, Missouri, U.S.
- Died: August 16, 1910 (aged 53); Dubuque, Iowa, U.S.
- Batted: Right Threw: Unknown

Major league debut
- August 17, 1877, for the St. Louis Brown Stockings

Last major league appearance
- May 13, 1883, for the St. Louis Browns

Major league statistics
- Batting average: .182
- Hits: 6
- Managerial record: 454–580
- Stats at Baseball Reference
- Managerial record at Baseball Reference

Teams
- As player: St. Louis Brown Stockings (1877); St. Louis Browns (1883); As manager: Milwaukee Brewers (1884); Cleveland Blues (1888); Cleveland Spiders (1889); Cincinnati Reds (1890–1891); Chicago Orphans (1900–1901); Washington Senators (1902–1903)

Thomas Joseph Loftus (November 15, 1856 – April 16, 1910) was an American professional baseball player and manager. He had a brief major-league playing career, appearing as an outfielder in parts of the 1877 and 1883 seasons. As a manager, he led major-league teams in the Union Association, American Association, National League, and American League.

== Career ==
Loftus' playing career began in 1877 with the St. Louis Brown Stockings of the National League, but he only played in nine career games, in 1877 and 1883, as an outfielder.

Loftus' first managerial job came in 1884 with the minor-league Milwaukee Brewers. That team also played 12 games as a replacement team in the short-lived Union Association, compiling an 8–4 record.

Loftus returned to manage the minor-league Brewers in 1885, until their league folded mid-season.

Loftus later took over as manager of the Cleveland Spiders, then known as the Blues, partway through the 1888 season after Jimmy Williams resigned. In 1890, Loftus was hired to manage the Cincinnati Reds, who had recently made the jump from the American Association to the National League. For much of the 1890s, Loftus managed teams in the Western League, most notably for Columbus and Grand Rapids. In 1900 he returned to the National League to manage the Chicago Orphans for two seasons and then the Washington Senators of the American League for two seasons.

In each of his managerial stops, Loftus had part ownership of the team. He died in Dubuque, Iowa, at the age of 53.
