= Jocko Halligan =

American baseball player (1868–1945)

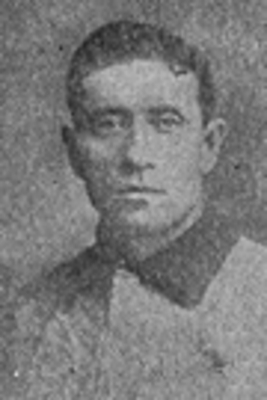
- Outfielder
- Born: December 8, 1868; Avon, New York, U.S.
- Died: February 13, 1945 (aged 76); Buffalo, New York, U.S.
- Batted: Left Threw: Unknown

MLB debut
- May 13, 1890, for the Buffalo Bisons

Last MLB appearance
- August 3, 1892, for the Baltimore Orioles

MLB statistics
- Batting average: .281
- At bats: 737
- Home Runs: 10
- Stats at Baseball Reference

Teams
- Buffalo Bisons (1890); Cincinnati Reds (1891–1892); Baltimore Orioles (1892)

William E. "Jocko" Halligan (December 8, 1868 – February 13, 1945) was an American professional baseball player who played outfield in the Major Leagues from 1890 to 1892. He would play for the Baltimore Orioles, Cincinnati Reds, and Buffalo Bisons.
