= Jack Rowe =

American baseball player, manager, and owner (1856–1911)

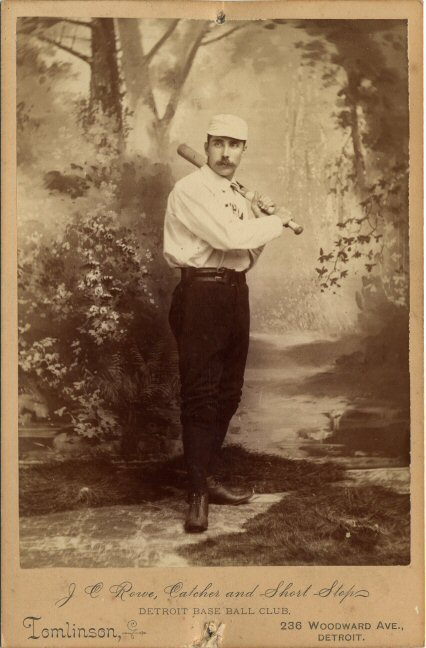
- Rowe in 1886
- Shortstop / Catcher
- Born: December 8, 1856; Cold Spring Township, Lebanon County, Pennsylvania, U.S.
- Died: April 25, 1911 (aged 54); St. Louis, Missouri, U.S.
- Batted: Left Threw: Right

MLB debut
- September 6, 1879, for the Buffalo Bisons (NL)

Last MLB appearance
- October 4, 1890, for the Buffalo Bisons (PL)

MLB statistics
- Batting average: .286
- Home runs: 28
- Runs batted in: 644
- Stats at Baseball Reference
- Managerial record at Baseball Reference

Teams
- Buffalo Bisons (NL) (1879–1885); Detroit Wolverines (1886–1888); Pittsburgh Alleghenys (1889); Buffalo Bisons (PL) (1890)

John Charles Rowe (December 8, 1856 – April 25, 1911) was an American professional baseball player, manager and team owner from 1877 to 1898. He played 12 years in Major League Baseball, as a shortstop (657 games), catcher (298 games), and outfielder (103 games), for four major league clubs. His longest stretches were in the National League with the Buffalo Bisons (1879–1885) and Detroit Wolverines (1886–1888). He was also a player-manager and part owner of the Buffalo Bisons of the Players' League in 1890, and the manager of the Buffalo Bisons (Eastern League) from 1896 to 1898.

Rowe appeared in 1,044 major league games, compiled a .286 batting average and .392 slugging percentage, and totaled 764 runs scored, 1,256 hits, 202 doubles, 88 triples, 28 home runs, and 644 RBIs. From 1881 to 1888, he was part of the "Big Four", a group of renowned batters (the others being Dan Brouthers, Hardy Richardson, and Deacon White) who played together in Buffalo and Detroit and led Detroit to the National League pennant and 1887 World Series championship.

== Early years ==
Rowe was born in Cold Spring Township, Lebanon County, Pennsylvania, in 1856. His older brother, Dave Rowe, also played and managed in the major leagues between 1877 and 1888.

== Professional baseball ==
=== Minor leagues ===
At age 19, Rowe began his career in organized baseball in 1876 with a club in Jacksonville, Illinois. In 1877, he played for the Milwaukee club in the League Alliance. He also played in 1877 and/or 1878 under Tom Loftus with the Peoria Reds. In 1879, Rowe and his brother, Dave Rowe, signed with the Rockford, Illinois team in the Northwestern League. At Rockford, Rowe earned a reputation as a hitter and "one of the best bare-handed catchers in the game."

=== Buffalo Bisons ===
After the Northwestern League folded in early July 1878, Rowe signed with the Buffalo Bisons of the National League. He made his major league debut on September 6, 1879, at age 22, and played in eight games for Buffalo that season, batting .353 in 38 plate appearances.

Rowe remained with Buffalo for seven years from 1879 to 1885. During the 1879 to 1884 seasons, Rowe was principally a catcher, appearing in 272 games at that position, 91 games as an outfielder, 55 as a shortstop and 20 at third base. In 1881, he compiled a .333 batting average and led the National League with 11 triples. His .480 slugging percentage in 1881 was the third highest in the league, and his 2.8 Wins Above Replacement (WAR) rating was the fifth highest among the league's position players. In 1882, he registered a 2.7 WAR rating and did not strike out even once in 329 plate appearances.

Rowe was one of four Buffalo players (with Dan Brouthers, Hardy Richardson, and Deacon White) who became known as the "Big Four." The "Big Four" were "regarded for many years as the greatest quartette (sic) in the history of the national pastime." During the 1884 season, the "Big Four" led Buffalo to a third place finish and a 64–47 (.577) record – the highest winning percentage in the club's history. Rowe registered a career high 4.6 WAR rating in 1884 and ranked among the league leaders with 14 triples (3rd), a .450 slugging percentage (9th) and a .352 on-base percentage (10th). He also led the National League's catchers in 1884 with a .943 fielding percentage.

In 1885, Rowe transitioned from a catcher to a shortstop, catching 23 games and playing shortstop in 65 games. Despite the strong bats of the "Big Four" (the "Big Four" combined for a .315 batting average in 1885), the Bisons had the worst pitching in the National League with a 4.28 earned run average (ERA), far above the league average of 2.82 ERA. The team finished in seventh place with a 38-74 record. The Bisons left the National League after the 1885 season.

=== Detroit Wolverines ===
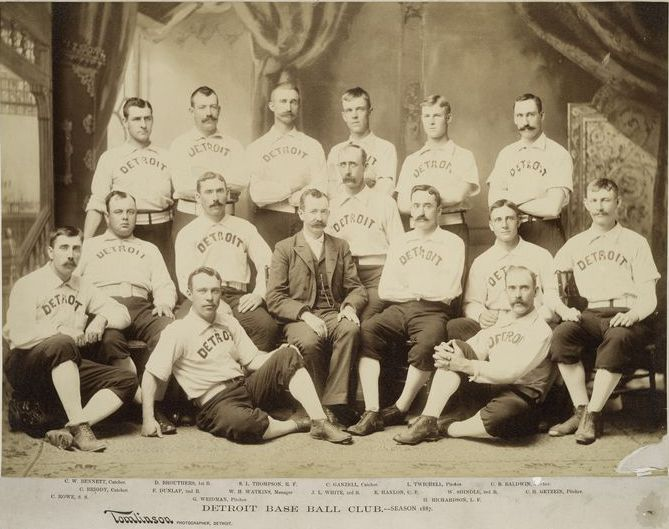
1887 Detroit Wolverines

In September 1885, the "Big Four" were sold by Buffalo to the Detroit Wolverines. All four remained with the Wolverines for three seasons, until the team disbanded after the 1888 season.

During the 1886 season, Rowe appeared in 111 games and was Detroit's starting shortstop. He also appeared in three games as a catcher. He compiled a 4.2 Wins Above Replacement (WAR) rating during the 1886 season, the eighth highest rating among all position players in the National League. As a batter, he hit for .303 average and ranked among the league leaders with a 4.0 Offensive WAR rating (10th), 97 runs scored (10th) and 199 total bases (10th). Defensively, he also ranked among the league leaders with a 1.0 Defensive WAR rating (7th) and 310 assists at shortstop (5th). With the addition of the "Big Four", the Wolverines improved substantially, finishing in second place with an 85-38 record.

The 1887 season was the pinnacle in the history of the Detroit Wolverines. The team won the National League pennant with a 79-45 record and then defeated the St. Louis Browns in the 1887 World Series. Rowe was the starting shortstop for the 1887 team, appearing in 124 games at the position, and continuing to rank among the best players in the National League. Rowe hit for a .318 average, and his 4.1 WAR rating ranked as the 10th highest among the league's position players. He further ranked among the league leaders with 135 runs scored (2nd), 30 doubles (7th) and 239 total bases (9th). He also had another solid year defensively, finishing with the fifth highest Defensive WAR rating (1.1) in the league, ranking second among the league's shortstops with a .907 fielding percentage, and ranking third with 378 assists at shortstop. Rowe also played well in the postseason, scoring 12 runs and stealing five bases in the 1887 World Series.

During the 1888 season, the Wolverines finished in fifth place with a 68–63 record. Rowe continued to play well with a 2.6 WAR rating in 105 games as the Wolverines' shortstop. However, he committed a career high 72 errors, the second highest total in the National League by any player at any position. With high salaries owed to the team's star players, and gate receipts declining markedly, the team folded in October 1888 with the players being sold to other teams. On October 16, 1888, the Wolverines sold Rowe and Pete Conway to the Pittsburgh Alleghenys.

=== Pittsburgh ===
Rowe initially refused to recognize the validity of his sale to the Pittsburgh Alleghenys. In December 1888, Rowe and Deacon White purchased interests in the Buffalo baseball club, deciding they would prefer to return to Buffalo as co-owners, managers, and players. William Nimick, the Alleghenys' owner, refused to release Rowe and White, reportedly saying, "If they don't want to play in Pittsburgh, they'll play nowhere." In July 1888, Rowe and White agreed to play for Pittsburgh. He appeared in 75 games as the Alleghenys' shortstop, but his batting average dropped to .259.

=== Players' League ===
In 1890, Rowe concluded his playing career as a player, manager, and owner of the Buffalo Bisons in the newly organized Players' League. Rowe and Deacon White owned the club. Rowe appeared in 125 games as the shortstop and saw his batting average drop to .250. Defensively, he led the Players' League shortstops with a .901 fielding percentage. He appeared in his last major league game on October 5, 1890. As the team's manager, he compiled a 27-72 (.273) record. The Players' League collapsed after the 1890 season, but Rowe and White sold the Buffalo club and grounds to "some Buffalo capitalists" for $2,500 in stock and $8,000 in cash. In 1891, The Sporting Life wrote that, having sold for a profit before the league's collapse, "Rowe and White are pretty slick, you bet."

=== Return to minors ===
Although Rowe did not return to the major leagues, he continued to play minor league baseball through the 1893 season. He played in 1891 for the Lincoln Rustlers of the Western Association. Rowe was reunited with his brother, Dave Rowe, who was manager of the Lincoln club.

Rowe concluded his playing career back in Buffalo, playing for the Buffalo Bisons of the Eastern League. In his last season of organized baseball, Rowe, at age 36, continued to hit well. In 110 games for the 1893 Bisons, Rowe compiled a .349 batting average and .456 slugging percentage with 113 runs scored, 22 doubles, nine triples, three home runs and 18 stolen bases.

=== Manager at Buffalo ===
In November 1895, after two years out of the sport, Rowe was hired to manage the Buffalo Bisons (Eastern League) for the 1896 season. At the time, The Sporting Life wrote: "Rowe is a resident of Buffalo and has lived in this city with his family for many years. He is well known in local base ball circles, and, for that matter, his is a familiar name in connection with the history of the game all over the country." Rowe managed the Bisons from 1896 to 1898. As the Bisons' manager, he developed several major league players, including Claude Ritchey, Chick Stahl, Harry Smith and Jack Barry. In 1897, Rowe had an all red-headed outfield at Buffalo that inspired Zane Grey's 1922 story, "The Red-Headed Outfield".

== Later years ==
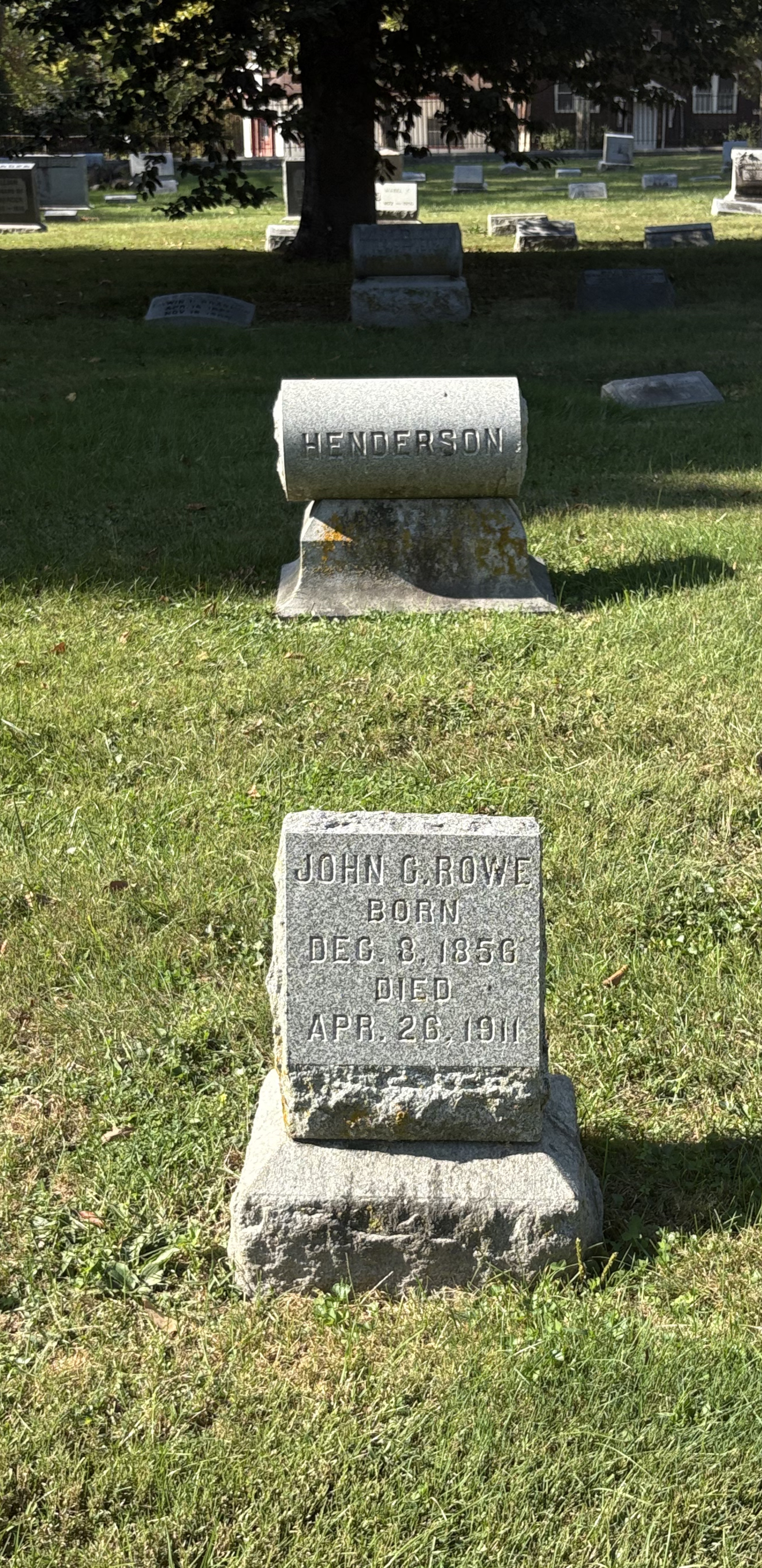
Rowe's grave at Bellefontaine Cemetery

After retiring from baseball, Rowe operated a cigar store in Buffalo. His store was reportedly "a popular gathering place for sporting figures of the city." In January 1899, The Sporting Life described him as "one of the most contented men in Buffalo these days", attending to his cigar business, and "ever ready to talk base ball."

Rowe became ill in 1910 and moved to St. Louis, Missouri, to live with his daughter, Helen. Rowe died in April 1911 at his daughter's residence in St. Louis at age 55. His cause of death has been reported as aortic regurgitation and nephritis. He was buried at Bellefontaine Cemetery in St. Louis.

== See also ==
- List of Major League Baseball players to hit for the cycle

Achievements
Preceded by Pete Browning	Hitting for the cycle August 21, 1886	Succeeded by Chippy McGarr
