= George Keefe =

American baseball player (1867–1935)

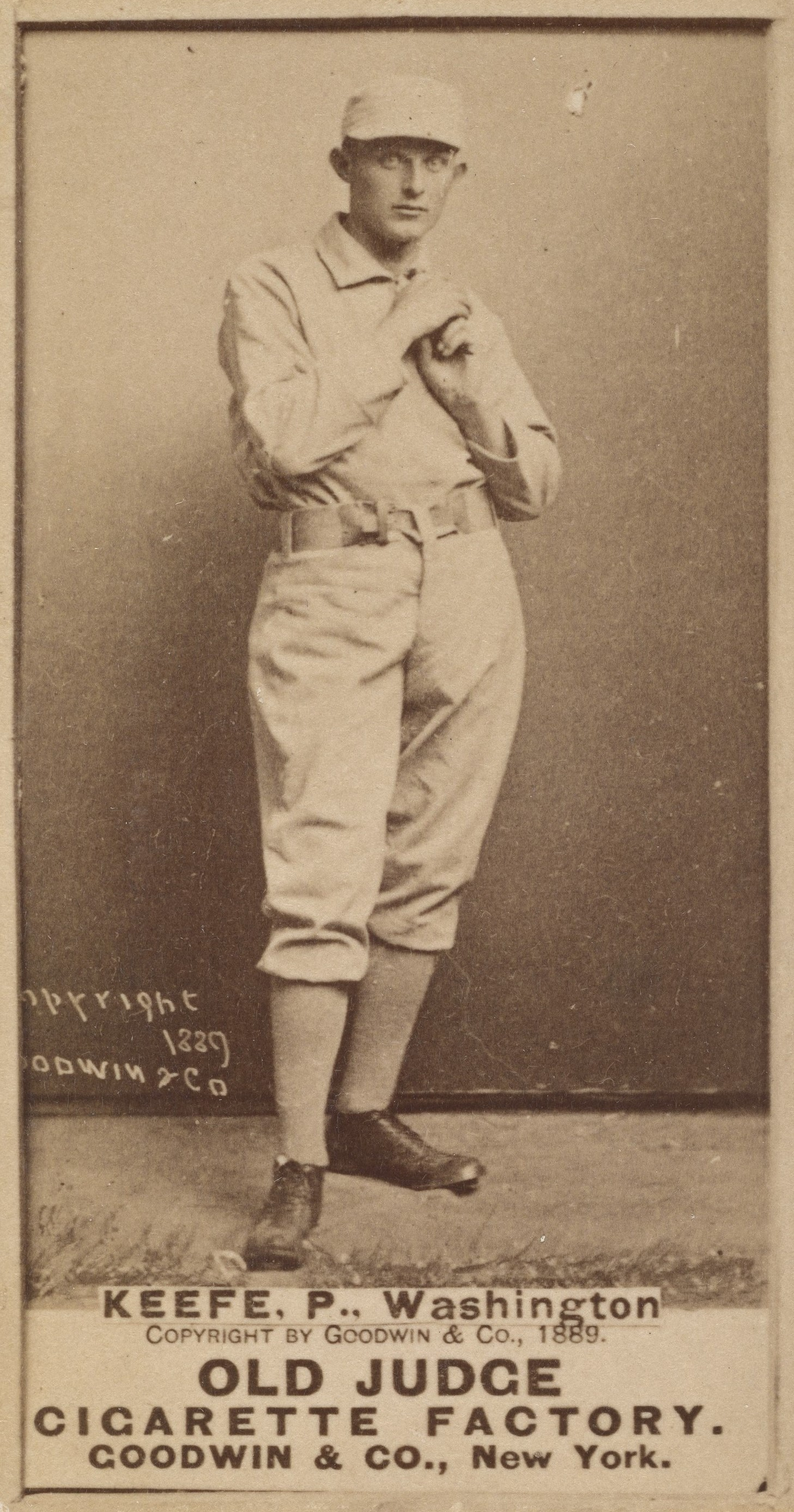
- 1889 baseball card of Keefe
- Pitcher
- Born: January 7, 1867; Washington, D.C., U.S.
- Died: August 24, 1935 (aged 68); Washington, D.C., U.S.
- Batted: Left Threw: Left

MLB debut
- July 30, 1886, for the Washington Nationals

Last MLB appearance
- April 28, 1891, for the Washington Statesmen

MLB statistics
- Win–loss record: 20–48
- Earned run average: 5.05
- Strikeouts: 213
- Stats at Baseball Reference

Teams
- Washington Nationals (1886–1889); Buffalo Bisons (1890); Washington Statesmen (1891)

George Washington Keefe (January 7, 1867 – August 24, 1935) was an American professional baseball left-handed starting pitcher. He played in Major League Baseball (MLB) for the Washington Nationals, Buffalo Bisons, and Washington Statesmen from 1886 to 1891.

== Baseball career ==
Keefe was born in Washington, D.C., in 1867. In 1886, he joined the Washington Nationals of the National League (NL) and made his major league debut on July 30 at the age of 19. The sixth-youngest player in the league, he went 0–3 with a 5.17 earned run average (ERA) in four games during his first big league season.

In 1887, Keefe appeared in only one game. He allowed 16 hits, four walks, and 20 runs (eight of which were earned) and completed (and lost) his only game of the season. He was also the sixth-youngest player in 1887.

In 1888, Keefe went 6–7 with a 2.84 ERA in 13 starts for the Nationals. He spent most of the season with the Troy Trojans of the International Association. With Troy, he pitched 343 innings and went 10–28 with a 3.46 ERA and 184 strikeouts.

Back with the Nationals in 1889, Keefe went 8–18 with a 5.13 ERA, finishing fifth in the league in walks allowed (143) and seventh in losses. On May 1, he set the NL record for most walks in an inning, when he walked seven batters in the fifth inning. The record was subsequently tied by Bob Ewing and Tony Mullane, and Dolly Gray walked eight batters in an inning in 1909. Gray was an American League pitcher, however.

Keefe played for the Buffalo Bisons of the Players' League in 1890. That year, he went 6–16 with a 6.52 ERA. He was ninth in the league in home runs allowed (11) and 10th in the league in losses. In 196 innings, he walked 138 batters and struck out only 55.

Keefe played his final MLB season in 1891 for the Washington Statesmen of the American Association. With the Statesmen, he went 0–3 with a 2.68 ERA in five games (four starts). He played his final major league game on April 28.

During his MLB career, Keefe went 20–48 in 78 games, 71 of which he started. He completed 68 games and had one shutout. In 616 1/3 innings, Keefe posted a 5.05 ERA, 360 walks, and 213 strikeouts. In 250 career at-bats, he hit .172.

Keefe then played in the minor leagues from 1892 to 1901.

Keefe died in Washington, D.C., in 1935. He was buried in Cedar Hill Cemetery in Suitland, Maryland.
