= Milwaukee Brewers (1884–1885) =

American professional baseball team

- 1884–1885; Milwaukee, Wisconsin

Minor league affiliations
- Previous classes: N/A (1885); Major (1884); N/A (1884)
- Previous leagues: Western League (1885); Union Association (1884); Northwestern League (1884)

Team data
- Previous parks: Wright Street Grounds

The Milwaukee Brewers of 1884–1885 were an American professional baseball team and a member of (in order) the Northwestern League, Union Association, and Western League. Of those leagues, the Union Association was considered a major league, while the others were considered minor league.

== Season records ==
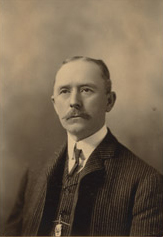
Tom Loftus, manager during part of 1884 and all of 1885

Season	League	Class.	Manager(s)	Record	Finish	Ref
1884	Northwestern League (1st half)†	–	Charlie Cushman / James McKee / Tom Loftus	42–30 (.583)	5th of 12	
1884	Northwestern League (2nd half)†	–	Tom Loftus	11–4 (.733)	1st of 4	
1884	Union Association	Major	Tom Loftus	8–4 (.667)	5th of 12	
1885	Western League‡	–	Tom Loftus	22–13 (.629)	2nd of 6	

† In 1884, the Northwestern League played a split season after several clubs disbanded in early August.
‡ In 1885, the Western League disbanded on June 15.

== Major-league history ==
After the Northwestern League completed its 1884 season in early September, the Brewers and St. Paul Saints joined the Union Association, a major league that only operated for one season, as replacement teams. Milwaukee (nicknamed the Cream Citys in some sources) (Note: Not be confused with the earlier Milwaukee Cream Citys, a non-professional team of the 1860s.) played twelve games and posted an 8–4 record, while St. Paul played eight games and posted a 2–6 record.

== See also ==
- History of professional baseball in Milwaukee
