= Buffalo Bisons (Players' League) =

Former Major League Baseball team of the Players' League in Buffalo, New York in 1890

Information
- League: Players' League (1890)
- Location: Buffalo, New York
- Ballpark: Olympic Park (1890)
- Founded: 1890
- Folded: 1890
- Colors: Gold, black
- Ownership: Connie Mack (minority)
- Manager: Jack Rowe & Jay Faatz

The Buffalo Bisons were an American baseball team in 1890 who were a member of the short-lived Players' League. The team was managed by Jack Rowe and Jay Faatz, and they finished eighth (last) with a record of 36-96 while playing their home games at Olympic Park. Hall of Famer Connie Mack was a part-owner of the franchise, having invested his life savings of $500 in the team, none of which he ever recouped.

In addition to owning part of the team, Mack also played catcher, batting .266 in 123 games with the league. Famed deaf player Dummy Hoy played for the 1890 Bisons, as did two players who appeared in the previous NL incarnation of the Bisons, Jack Rowe and Deacon White.

The PL Bisons were an "outlaw" franchise that played concurrently with the minor league Buffalo Bisons and apparently used the stock Bisons name without the permission of the established club; the Players' League club also acquired the lease to Olympic Park for the seasons, forcing the "legitimate" Bisons to play elsewhere. They settled on the amateur Buffalo Baseball League's grounds near East Genesee Street and the Belt Line Railroad. They moved back to Olympic Park after the Players' League folded. The current Bisons franchise does not recognize the PL Bisons as part of their history.

== National Baseball Hall of Fame members ==
Player/Manager	Year inducted	Years with the Bisons
Connie Mack	1937	1890
Deacon White	2013	1890

== See also ==
- 1890 Buffalo Bisons season
- Buffalo Bisons (PL) all-time roster
