= Bergen (name) =

Bergen is a surname originating from several Germanic languages, from a word for "hill(s)" or "mountain(s)".

Notable persons with this surname include:

- Beverley Bergen, New Zealand soprano opera singer
- Bill Bergen (1878–1943), American baseball player
- Bob Bergen (born 1964), American voice actor
- Candice Bergen (actress) (born 1946), American actress and model
- Candice Bergen (politician) (born 1964), Canadian federal politician
- David Bergen (born 1957), Canadian author
- Edgar Bergen (1903–1978), American actor and radio performer
- Fanny Dickerson Bergen (1846–1924), American folklorist, ethnobiologist and author
- Frances Bergen (1922–2006), American actress and model
- Hans Hansen Bergen (c.1610–1654), Norwegian-born shipwright, and one of the earliest settlers of the Dutch colony of New Amsterdam
- Helen Corinne Bergen (1868–?), American journalist and author
- John Teunis Bergen (1786–1855), American politician
- Junior Bergen (born 2002), American football player
- Larisa Bergen (1949–2023), Soviet volleyball player
- Martin Bergen (disambiguation), several people
- Peter Bergen (born 1962), British-American journalist
- Polly Bergen (1930–2014), American entertainer
- Stanley S. Bergen Jr. (1929–2019), American university president
- Teunis G. Bergen (1806–1881), American politician
- Todd Bergen, Canadian ice hockey player
- W. R. Bergen, American basketball coach
- Wendy Bergen (1956–2017), American television journalist

== van/von Bergen ==
The preposition "of" or "from" is a common part of names in Dutch (Van), German (von) and related languages.

Notable people whose surnames contain this particle in conjunction with "Bergen" include:

- John S. Van Bergen (1885–1969), American architect
- Nora von Bergen (born 1990), Swiss ice dancer
- Peter A. Van Bergen (1763–1804), American politician
- Steve von Bergen (born 1983), Swiss footballer

== See also ==
- Bergen (disambiguation)
