= Bergen (disambiguation) =

Bergen is the second-largest city in Norway.

Bergen may also refer to:

== Places ==
=== Australia ===
- Bergen, Queensland, a locality in the Toowoomba Region

=== Belgium ===
- Bergen, the Dutch name of Mons

=== Canada ===
- Bergen, Alberta

=== Germany ===
- Bergen, Lower Saxony, in the district of Celle
- Bergen, Saxony, in the Vogtlandkreis, Saxony
- Bergen an der Dumme, in the district of Lüchow-Dannenberg, Lower Saxony
- Bergen auf Rügen, on the island of Rügen
- Bergen, Upper Bavaria
- Bergen, Middle Franconia
- Bergen, Hesse
- Bergen, Neuburg
- Bergen, Rhineland-Palatinate

=== Netherlands ===
- Bergen, North Holland
  - Bergen aan Zee, part of the municipality of Bergen, North Holland
- Bergen, Limburg
- Bergen op Zoom

=== United States ===
- Bergen, Minnesota
- Bergen County, New Jersey
- Bergen Section, Jersey City, New Jersey
- Bergen (town), New York
- Bergen (village), New York
- Bergen, North Dakota
- Bergen, Wisconsin (disambiguation), multiple locations

==== Locations ====
- Bergen-Lafayette in Jersey City, New Jersey
- Bergen Point in Bayonne, New Jersey
- Bergen Square in Jersey City, New Jersey
- Bergen Hill
- Bergen Arches
- Bergen Tunnels
- Bergen Street, a station on the New York City Subway

==== Historical uses ====
- Bergen, New Netherland
- Bergen City, New Jersey
- Bergen Township, New Jersey (1661–1862)
- Bergen Township, New Jersey (1893–1902)
- Burgin, Kentucky, originally known as Bergen in the 19th century

== People ==
- Bergen (singer), Turkish singer
- Bergen (name), a surname (including a list of people with this surname)
- Van Bergen, a surname (including a list of people with this surname)

== Other uses ==
- Bergen, a type of backpack used by the British military
- Bergen Shopping Addiction Scale, a 28 item psychological screening tool
- Bergen (domino game), a type of domino game in which points are scored for matching ends of the line of play
- Bergen (film), a 2022 biopic about the Turkish singer

== See also ==
- Bergen-Belsen (disambiguation)
- Bergene
