= Bergen, New York (disambiguation) =

Bergen, New York, is the name of two places in Genesee County, New York:

- Bergen (village), New York
- Bergen (town), New York

For other places with a similar name, see Bergen (disambiguation).
