= Hardy Richardson =

American baseball player (1855–1931)

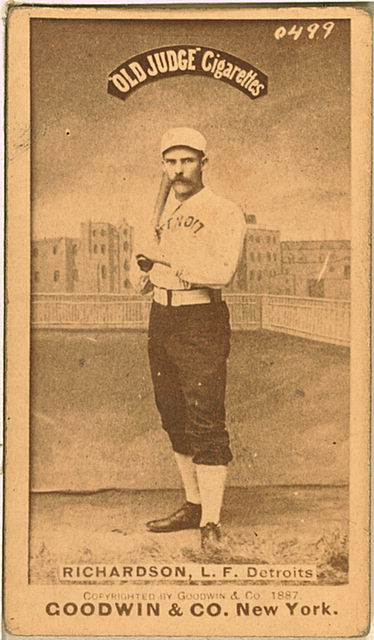
- Infielder / Outfielder
- Born: April 21, 1855; Clarksboro, New Jersey, U.S.
- Died: January 14, 1931 (aged 75); Utica, New York, U.S.
- Batted: Right Threw: Right

MLB debut
- May 1, 1879, for the Buffalo Bisons

Last MLB appearance
- September 10, 1892, for the New York Giants

MLB statistics
- Batting average: .299
- Home runs: 73
- Runs batted in: 828
- Stats at Baseball Reference

Teams
- Buffalo Bisons (1879–1885); Detroit Wolverines (1886–1888); Boston Beaneaters (1889); Boston Reds (1890–1891); Washington Senators (1892); New York Giants (1892)

Career highlights and awards
- 1887 World Series champion; NL home run leader (1886)

Abram Harding "Hardy" Richardson (April 21, 1855 – January 14, 1931), also known as "Hardie" and "Old True Blue", was an American professional baseball player whose career spanned from 1875 to 1892 with a brief minor league comeback in 1898. He played 14 seasons in Major League Baseball, playing at every position, including 585 games at second base, 544 games in the outfield, and 178 games at third base. Richardson played for six major league teams, with his longest stretches having been for the Buffalo Bisons (1879–1885), Detroit Wolverines (1886–1888) and Boston Reds (1890–91).

Richardson appeared in 1,334 major league games, compiled a .299 batting average and .437 slugging percentage, and totaled 1,127 runs scored, 1,694 hits, 305 doubles, 126 triples, 73 home runs, 828 RBIs, and 377 bases on balls. From 1881 to 1888, he was part of the "Big Four", a group of renowned batters (the others being Dan Brouthers, Jack Rowe, and Deacon White) who played together in Buffalo and Detroit and led Detroit to the National League pennant and 1887 World Series championship.

== Early years ==
Richardson was born in 1855 at Clarksboro, which is located in the existing municipality of East Greenwich Township, New Jersey. His father, Robert D. Richardson, was a New Jersey native who worked in 1870 as a house carpenter. His mother, Naomi (Jones) Richardson, was a Pennsylvania native. Richardson grew up in Greenwich Township, Gloucester County, and Gloucester City, New Jersey. By 1870, Richardson, at age 15, was working on a farm.

== Professional baseball player ==
=== Minor leagues ===
Richardson began playing organized baseball with semipro teams in South Jersey and Philadelphia in the early 1870s. In 1875, he played at third base and catcher for the Gloucester City, New Jersey club. For a portion of the 1876 season, he played with the Philadelphias, but that team disbanded in July 1876. Richardson next played for the "Crickets" from Binghamton, New York, during the 1876 and 1877 seasons. In 1878, he played for the Utica, New York club in the International Association for Professional Base Ball Players. While playing for Utica, the New York Clipper called him the best fielding center fielder in baseball; he also won "The Clipper medal for best fielding average."

=== Buffalo ===
Richardson joined the Buffalo Bisons of the National League in 1879 and remained with Buffalo for seven years from 1879 to 1885.

==== 1879–1882 ====
As a rookie, Richardson made his major league debut on May 1, 1879, and promptly became Buffalo's starting third baseman. He compiled a .283 batting average, earned a 2.5 Wins Above Replacement (WAR) rating, and ranked fifth in the National League with 10 triples and fourth with 16 bases on balls. He also led the league's third basemen in games played (78), double plays turned (13), and errors (44), and ranked second at the position in assists (153), putouts (83), and fielding percentage (.843).

In 1880, Richardson was again positioned at third base. He saw his batting average drop to .259 and his WAR rating drop to 1.1. He still hit for power and ranked among the league leaders with eight triples (10th) and 26 extra base hits (10th). Defensively, his performance suffered as he ranked second among the league's third basemen with 47 errors and saw his Defensive WAR rating dip into negative territory at -0.7.

After a poor defensive performance in 1880, Richardson was moved to the outfield in 1881. With the move, his batting average jumped to .291, and his WAR rating bounced back to 2.5 -- 10th best among the league's position players. Showing good power, he ranked among the league leaders with nine triples (3rd), 53 RBIs (4th), 29 extra base hits (9th), 62 runs scored (10th), 100 hits (10th), and 142 total bases (10th). The move to the outfield also suited Richardson defensively. He led the league's outfielders with 45 assists and a range factor of 2.84 and ranked third with 179 putouts. Richardson's total of 45 outfield assists (in only 79 games at the position) was five short of Orator Shafer's major league record and remains the third highest season total in major league history.

In 1882, and despite his solid defensive performance in the outfield, Richardson switched positions for the second time in as many years. This time, he was moved to second base, where he played 83 games. Richardson handled the move reasonably well, as he led the league's second basemen with 275 putouts and ranked second with a 6.69 range factor and 63 errors. He also hit .271, earned a 2.2 WAR rating and ranked fourth in the league with 57 RBIs.

==== The "Big Four" ====
From 1881 to 1888, Richardson was one of four Buffalo (later Detroit) infielders with Dan Brouthers, Jack Rowe, and Deacon White who were known in baseball as the "Big Four." The "Big Four" played together for eight years and were "regarded for many years as the greatest quartette in the history of the national pastime." The Sporting News later wrote; "How the Big Four was admired! Even in hostile cities the fans praised them in the next breath after they had jeered them."

Richardson remained the Bisons' second baseman in 1883, playing all 92 of his games at the position. His 4.1 WAR rating in 1883 was the second highest in his career and the ninth highest among the National League's position players. He ranked among the league leaders with a .311 batting average (10th), .347 on-base percentage (9th), 34 doubles (5th), 42 extra base hits (9th), and 146 times on base (9th). Defensively, he led the league's second basemen with a career high 6.88 range factor, and ranked second at the position in assists (344) and putouts (289). However, he also ranked second at the position with a career high 68 errors.

In a game against Philadelphia on July 20, 1883, both Richardson and Jack Rowe were credited with home runs when outfielder Conny Doyle was unable to find balls they hit into a patch of deep of grass in the left field corner.

During the 1884 season, Richardson played 71 games at second base and 24 in the outfield, as the "Big Four" led Buffalo to a third place finish and a 64–47 (.577) record – the highest winning percentage in the club's history. All four players had outstanding seasons, combining for an 18.6 WAR rating. The chart below tracks the WAR rating of the "Big Four" during their eight seasons together.

Year	Brouthers	Richardson	Rowe	White	Total WAR
1881	2.5	2.5	2.8	1.2	9.0
1882	5.9	2.2	2.7	1.2	12.0
1883	5.8	4.1	1.9	1.1	12.9
1884	5.4	3.7	4.6	4.9	18.6
1885	5.2	3.2	2.2	2.1	12.7
1886	8.2	7.0	4.2	2.7	22.1
1887	5.3	3.8	4.1	2.3	15.5
1888	6.6	2.1	2.6	3.4	14.7
Total	44.8	28.6	25.1	19.1	117.6

Richardson was involved in another unusual circumstance in a game against the Chicago White Stockings on August 13, 1884. Chicago's George Gore was instructed by player-manager Cap Anson to avoid the double play. When the next batter hit a ground ball, Gore tackled Richardson at second base before he could complete the relay throw. The umpire called both the batter and the runner out, and Anson protested the ruling and refused to resume play, leading the umpire to declare the game forfeited to Buffalo. The two teams then agreed to resume a game which had been postponed earlier in the season, as a way of placating the dissatisfied fans. In the later game, Anson decided to demonstrate of the right way to break up the double play. He reached first base, and when the next batter hit a ground ball to Richardson, Anson waved his arms while running to second in an effort to interfere with Richardson's throw. Possibly flustered by this display, Richardson in turn struck Anson square in the head with his throw, which was delivered hard enough that it bounced all the way into the grandstands. A woozy Anson was forced to leave the game.

During the 1885 season, Richardson split his time between second base (50 games) and outfield (48 games), and even appeared in one game as a pitcher – compiling a 2.25 earned run average in four innings pitched. He ranked among the league leaders with a .319 batting average (4th), .458 slugging percentage (4th), 11 triples (7th), six home runs (7th), 195 total bases (7th), 90 runs scored (8th), and 3.9 Offensive WAR rating (8th).

=== Detroit ===
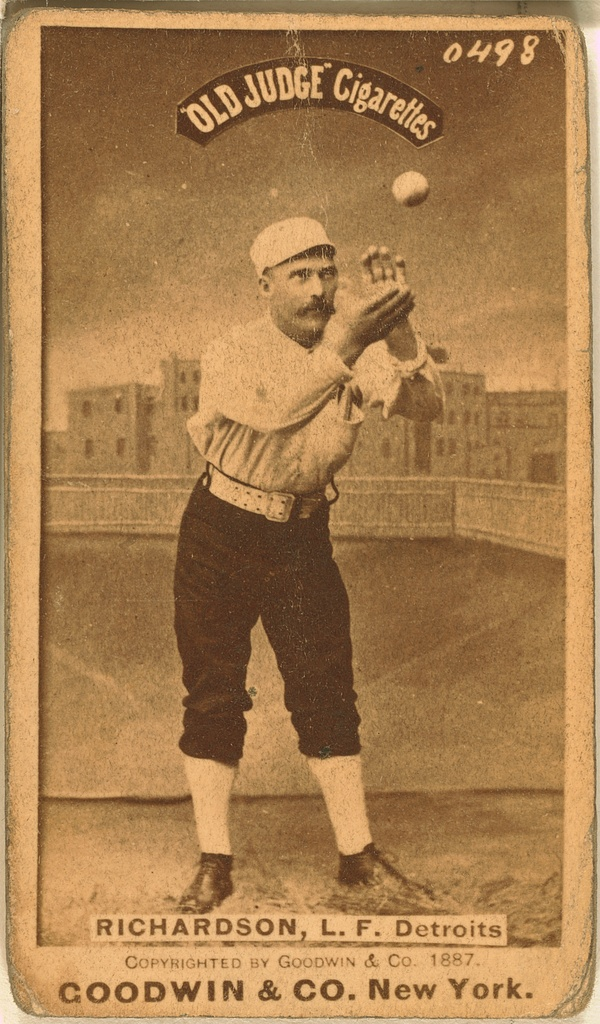
Richardson, c. 1887, in Detroit uniform

In mid-September 1885, the Detroit Wolverines purchased the "Big Four" from Buffalo, paying $7,000 for entire team. League officials initially halted the sale, but ultimately allowed it to proceed, provided the Big Four did not play for Detroit until the start of the 1886 season. Richardson responded to threats to void the transaction by saying that the "Big Four" would "retire to Canada".

The merger of the Detroit and Buffalo line-ups turned two losing teams (Buffalo was 38-74 in 1885, Detroit 41-67) into one of the best in the game. With the addition of the "Big Four", the Wolverines improved substantially, finishing in second place with an 85-38 record. For Richardson, the 1886 season was the best of his career with a 7.0 WAR rating – the fourth highest among the National League's position players. He led the league with 189 hits and 11 home runs and was among the league leaders with a .351 batting average (5th), .402 on-base percentage (6th), .504 slugging percentage (4th), 125 runs scored (4th), 271 total bases (3rd), 27 doubles (7th), 11 triples (8th), 49 extra base hits (4th), and 42 stolen bases (4th). He also had the second highest ratio of at bats to strikeouts at 48.9. Defensively, Richardson played at multiple positions during the 1886 season, including 80 games in the outfield, 42 at second base, and four as a pitcher (12 innings, 4.50 ERA).

The 1887 season was the pinnacle in the eight-year history of the Detroit Wolverines. The team won the National League pennant with a 79-45 record and then defeated the St. Louis Browns in the 1887 World Series. In an article published in 1911, Richardson called the 1887 Detroit team "one of the grandest collection of hitters ever seen together." Richardson contributed another strong season, splitting his playing time between second base (64 games) and outfield (59 games), and compiling a 3.8 WAR rating. He was again among the league leaders with a .328 batting average (6th), 131 runs scored (3rd), 178 hits (3rd), 263 total bases (3rd), 18 triples (6th), 94 RBIs (7th), and 51 extra base hits (9th). Despite playing only 64 games at the position, he also led the league's second basemen with a 6.78 range factor.

During the 1888 season, the Wolverines finished in fifth place with a 68-63 record. Richardson's playing time was limited to 58 games at second base, and his batting average and WAR rating to .289 and 2.1 – Richardson's lowest numbers since 1880. With high salaries owed to the team's star players, and gate receipts declining markedly, the team folded in October 1888 with the players being sold to other teams. On October 16, 1888, the Wolverines sold Richardson along with Charlie Bennett, Dan Brouthers, Charlie Ganzel and Deacon White to the Boston Beaneaters for an estimated $30,000.

=== Boston ===
During the 1889 season, Richardson played for the Boston Beaneaters, appearing in 86 games as a second baseman and 46 as an outfielder. He compiled a .304 batting average and 3.9 WAR rating and ranked among the National League leaders with 122 runs scored (8th), 163 hits (9th), 47 stolen bases (8th), and 10 triples (10th). He also had the second highest range factor (6.47) among the league's second basemen. In his only season with the Beaneaters, he helped the team to a second place finish with an 83-45 record.

In 1890, Richardson and teammate Dan Brouthers played in the newly-formed Players' League, joining the Boston Reds. The pair helped the Reds win the first and only Players' League pennant with an 81-48 record.

Richardson was a strong supporter of the Brotherhood of Professional Base-Ball Players, the union that represented the players and organized the Players' League in response to unfair treatment by team owners. In January 1890, he spoke out against players like teammate John Clarkson who had joined the Brotherhood but remained with their old clubs. Richardson said he would remain loyal to the Players' League even if it could only pay him $10 a week and added: "I held up my hand and swore that I would stick to the brotherhood... I respect my word and regard my oath as sacred. You have no idea how hot it makes me to think of the way some of these players have acted."

Richardson played in the outfield for the Boston Players' League club, appearing in 124 games at the position. He compiled a .326 batting average in 1890 and led the Players' League with a career high of 146 RBIs. He also stole 42 bases and ranked among the league leaders with 13 home runs (2nd), 274 total bases (4th), 181 hits (5th), and 126 runs scored (10th). He also set a major league record in July 1890 by hitting home runs in five consecutive games, a record that was unmatched until Babe Ruth accomplished the feat in 1921.

At the end of the 1890 season, the Players' League disbanded, but the Boston Reds remained a major league club in 1891 as part of the American Association. Richardson again played in the outfield for the 1891 Reds, but he was limited to 74 games, having been laid up at his home in Gloucester City, New Jersey, after suffering a broken bone in his foot. His batting average fell by 71 points to .255, and his WAR rating of 1.0 was the lowest of his career to that time. He did not rank among the American Association's leaders in any major offensive or defensive category, though he ranked second in the league with a ratio of 39.7 at bats per strikeout.

=== Washington and New York ===
Richardson played briefly for the Washington Senators in 1892. He appeared in 10 games, compiled a .108 batting average and was released by the Senators on April 28, 1892. Richardson was then signed by the New York Giants of the National League. He appeared in 64 games for the Giants, 33 of them at second base, and compiled a .214 batting average. He was released by the Giants late in the season, having appeared in his final major league game on September 10, 1892, at age 37.

=== 1898 comeback ===
From May to June 1898, Richardson made a brief comeback at age 43 as a player for the Utica Pent-Ups in the New York State League.

=== Career statistics and legacy ===
In his 14 years in major league baseball, Richardson appeared in 1,334 major league games, compiled a .299 batting average and .437 slugging percentage, and totaled 1,127 runs scored, 1,694 hits, 305 doubles, 126 triples, 73 home runs, 828 RBIs, and 377 bases on balls. His best season was 1886 when he led the National League in home runs and compiled a 7.0 Wins Above Replacement (WAR) rating, the fourth highest among all position players in the National League. His career WAR rating was 40.5.

In the 1894 Reach Guide to baseball, Jim Hart, who was Richardson's manager in 1889 with the Beaneaters, offered the following high opinion of Richardson: "I think Ed Williamson and Hardy Richardson would pretty nearly make a tie as to being the best ball player since professional base ball has existed." Baseball historian Bill James in 2001 ranked Richardson as the 39th-best second baseman in the history of baseball in The New Bill James Historical Baseball Abstract.

== Family and later years ==
In January 1886, Richardson was married in a ceremony at Utica, New York, to Lillie M. Davis. In reporting on the wedding, The Sporting News wrote: "Mr. Richardson's fame as a ball player extends from Maine to California, and is only surpassed by his genial gentlemanly bearing and manner, which have earned for him the best wishes of innumerable friends for his future happiness." Richardson and his wife had a daughter, Dorothy, born in 1895. After retiring from baseball, Richardson reportedly operated a hotel in Utica, New York. By 1900, he was living in Utica with his wife, Lillie, and their daughter, Dorothy, and he was employed as an "art glass stainer." By 1905, Richardson and his wife had moved to German Flatts and later to Ilion, both in Herkimer County, New York, where he worked for the Remington Typewriter Company.

In late 1910 and early 1911, Richardson wrote about his baseball memories in a series of articles for the Hearst newspapers.

By 1930, Richardson was retired and living with his wife in Utica as boarders at the home of cement salesman, Robert C. Weaver. Richardson died in January 1931 at age 75 in Utica, New York. He was buried at the Forest Hill Cemetery in that city.

== In popular culture ==
Richardson was referenced in a first-season episode of the HBO television series, Boardwalk Empire, in October 2010. The lead character, Nucky Thompson, portrayed by Steve Buscemi, noted that he had owned an autographed catcher's mitt signed by Hardy Richardson when he was a child. It was stolen from him by older, bigger kids. After his father made him fight four older boys to get it back, Nucky was beaten unconscious and spent 11 days in the hospital.

== See also ==
- List of Major League Baseball career triples leaders
- List of Major League Baseball career runs scored leaders
- List of Major League Baseball annual home run leaders
- List of Major League Baseball runs-batted-in champions
