= List of Tulsa Golden Hurricane men's basketball seasons =

This is a list of seasons completed by the Tulsa Golden Hurricane men's college basketball team.

== Seasons ==
Record table
Season	Coach	Overall	Conference	Standing	Postseason
W.R. Bergen (Independent) (1907–1909)
1907–08	W.R. Bergen	1–1			
1908–09	W.R. Bergen	3–1			
W.R. Bergen:		4–2			
1909–13	No program				
Harvey Allen (Independent) (1913–1914)
1913–14	Harvey Allen	3–2			
Forest Rees (Independent) (1914–1915)
1914–15	Forest Rees	6–3			
Francis Schmidt (Independent) (1915–1917)
1915–16	Francis Schmidt	9–7			
1916–17	Francis Schmidt	11–7			
Hal Mefford (Independent) (1917–1918)
1917–18	Hal Mefford	1–5			
Francis Schmidt (Independent) (1918–1922)
1918–19	Francis Schmidt	5–3			
1919–20	Francis Schmidt	16–3			
1920–21	Francis Schmidt	18–2			National AAU Tournament Second Round
1921–22	Francis Schmidt	14–4			
Francis Schmidt:		73–26			
Howard Acher (Independent) (1922–1925)
1922–23	Howard Acher	1–3			
1923–24	Howard Acher	2–1			
1924–25	Howard Acher	13–8			
Howard Acher:		16–12			
J.B. Miller (Independent) (1925–1930)
1925–26	J.B. Miller	7–10			
1926–27	J.B. Miller	3–6			
1927–28	J.B. Miller	2–12			
1928–29	J.B. Miller	2–11			
1929–30	J.B. Miller	2–6			
J.B. Miller:		16–45			
Oliver Hodge (Independent) (1930–1932)
1930–31	Oliver Hodge	10–4			
1931–32	Oliver Hodge	10–7			
Oliver Hodge:		20–11			
Chet Benefiel (Independent) (1932–1935)
1932–33	Chet Benefiel	11–6			
1933–34	Chet Benefiel	6–8			
1934–35	Chet Benefiel	6–10			
Chet Benefiel (Missouri Valley Conference) (1935–1939)
1935–36	Chet Benefiel	6–14	5–7	5th	
1936–37	Chet Benefiel	9–9	4–8	5th	
1937–38	Chet Benefiel	12–10	8–6	3rd	
1938–39	Chet Benefiel	15–6	8–6	T–3rd	
Chet Benefiel:		65–63	25–27		
H.B. "Tex" Ryon (Missouri Valley Conference) (1939–1940)
1939–40	Tex Ryon	12–15	5–7	5th	
Jack Sterrett (Missouri Valley Conference) (1940–1941)
1940–41	Jack Sterrett	12–9	7–5	3rd	
H.B. "Tex" Ryon (Missouri Valley Conference) (1941–1942)
1941–42	Tex Ryon	3–13	3–7	5th	
Tex Ryon:		15–28	8–14		
Mike Milligan (Missouri Valley Conference) (1942–1943)
1942–43	Mike Milligan	0–10	0–10	6th	
Woody West (Missouri Valley Conference) (1943–1944)
1943–44	Woody West	5–3	0–0		
Paul Alyea (Missouri Valley Conference) (1944–1945)
1944–45	Paul Alyea	4–8	0–0		
Don Shields (Missouri Valley Conference) (1945–1947)
1945–46	Don Shields	6–12	3–9	7th	
1946–47	Don Shields	5–19	3–9	T–5th	
Don Shields:		11–31	6–18		
John Garrison (Missouri Valley Conference) (1947–1949)
1947–48	John Garrison	7–16	2–8	5th	
1948–49	John Garrison	4–20	0–10	6th	
John Garrison:		11–36	2–18		
Clarence Iba (Missouri Valley Conference) (1949–1960)
1949–50	Clarence Iba	12–11	3–9	6th	
1950–51	Clarence Iba	10–17	4–10	T–6th	
1951–52	Clarence Iba	14–10	5–5	3rd	
1952–53	Clarence Iba	15–10	5–5	T–2nd	NIT First Round
1953–54	Clarence Iba	15–14	5–5	3rd	
1954–55	Clarence Iba	21–7	8–2	T–1st	NCAA Sweet Sixteen
1955–56	Clarence Iba	16–10	4–8	5th	
1956–57	Clarence Iba	8–17	5–9	T–5th	
1957–58	Clarence Iba	7–19	4–10	T–6th	
1958–59	Clarence Iba	10–15	2–12	T–7th	
1959–60	Clarence Iba	9–17	5–9	6th	
Clarence Iba:		137–147	50–84		
Joe Swank (Missouri Valley Conference) (1960–1968)
1960–61	Joe Swank	8–17	2–10	6th	
1961–62	Joe Swank	7–19	4–8	6th	
1962–63	Joe Swank	17–8	5–7	5th	
1963–64	Joe Swank	10–15	2–10	6th	
1964–65	Joe Swank	14–11	7–7	T–5th	
1965–66	Joe Swank	16–13	6–8	T–6th	
1966–67	Joe Swank	19–8	10–4	2nd	NIT First Round
1967–68	Joe Swank	11–12	5–11	7th	
Joe Swank:		102–103	41–65		
Ken Hayes (Missouri Valley Conference) (1968–1975)
1968–69	Ken Hayes	19–8	11–5	3rd	NIT First Round
1969–70	Ken Hayes	15–11	8–8	5th	
1970–71	Ken Hayes	17–9	8–6	T–4th	
1971–72	Ken Hayes	15–11	5–9	6th	
1972–73	Ken Hayes	18–8	10–4	T–3rd	
1973–74	Ken Hayes	19–8	7–6	T–3rd	
1974–75	Ken Hayes	15–14	5–9	6th	
Ken Hayes:		118–69	54–47		
Jim King (Missouri Valley Conference) (1975–1980)
1975–76	Jim King	9–18	4–8	T–4th	
1976–77	Jim King	7–20	3–9	7th	
1977–78	Jim King	9–18	7–9	7th	
1978–79	Jim King	13–14	7–9	7th	
1979–80	Jim King; Bill Franey^{[Note A]}	8–19	5–11	T–8th	
Jim King:		44–82	24–41		
Nolan Richardson (Missouri Valley Conference) (1980–1985)
1980–81	Nolan Richardson	26–7	11–5	T–2nd	NIT Champion
1981–82	Nolan Richardson	24–6	12–4	T–2nd	NCAA Division I First Round
1982–83	Nolan Richardson	19–12	11–7	T–3rd	NIT First Round
1983–84	Nolan Richardson	27–4	13–3	T–1st	NCAA Division I First Round
1984–85	Nolan Richardson	23–8	12–4	1st	NCAA Division I First Round
Nolan Richardson:		119–37	59–23		
J.D. Barnett (Missouri Valley Conference) (1985–1991)
1985–86	J.D. Barnett	23–9	10–6	T–2nd	NCAA Division I First Round
1986–87	J.D. Barnett	22–8	11–3	1st	NCAA Division I First Round
1987–88	J.D. Barnett	8–20	4–10	7th	
1988–89	J.D. Barnett	18–13	10–4	T–2nd	
1989–90	J.D. Barnett	17–13	9–5	T–2nd	NIT First Round
1990–91	J.D. Barnett	18–12	9–5	T–2nd	NIT First Round
J.D. Barnett:		106–75	53–33		
Tubby Smith (Missouri Valley Conference) (1991–1995)
1991–92	Tubby Smith	17–13	12–6	T–4th	
1992–93	Tubby Smith	15–14	10–6	4th	
1993–94	Tubby Smith	23–8	15–3	1st	NCAA Division I Sweet Sixteen
1994–95	Tubby Smith	24–8	15–3	1st	NCAA Division I Sweet Sixteen
Tubby Smith:		79–43	52–18		
Steve Robinson (Missouri Valley Conference) (1995–1996)
1995–96	Steve Robinson	23–8	12–6	3rd	NCAA Division I First Round
Steve Robinson (Western Athletic Conference) (1996–1997)
1996–97	Steve Robinson	23–10	12–4	2nd	NCAA Division I Second Round
Steve Robinson:		46–18	24–10		
Bill Self (Western Athletic Conference) (1997–2000)
1997–98	Bill Self	19–12	9–5	3rd	
1998–99	Bill Self	23–10	9–5	T–1st	NCAA Division I Second Round
1999–00	Bill Self	32–5	12–2	1st	NCAA Division I Elite Eight
Bill Self:		74–27	30–12		
Buzz Peterson (Western Athletic Conference) (2000–2001)
2000–01	Buzz Peterson	26–11	10–6	2nd	NIT Champion
John Phillips (Western Athletic Conference) (2001–2004)
2001–02	John Phillips	27–7	15–3	T–1st	NCAA Division I Second Round
2002–03	John Phillips	23–10	12–6	T–2nd	NCAA Division I Second Round
2003–04	John Phillips	9–20	5–13	T–8th	
2004–05	John Phillips; Pooh Williamson^{[Note B]}	9–20	5–13	9th	
John Phillips:		61–42	32–22		
Doug Wojcik (Conference USA) (2005–2012)
2005–06	Doug Wojcik	11–17	6–8	T–6th	
2006–07	Doug Wojcik	20–11	9–7	T–4th	
2007–08	Doug Wojcik	25–14	8–8	T–5th	CBI Champion
2008–09	Doug Wojcik	25–11	12–4	2nd	NIT Second Round
2009–10	Doug Wojcik	23–12	10–6	5th	NIT First Round
2010–11	Doug Wojcik	19–13	11–5	T–2nd	
2011–12	Doug Wojcik	17–14	10–6	T–3rd	
Doug Wojcik:		140–92	66–44		
Danny Manning (Conference USA) (2012–2014)
2012–13	Danny Manning	17–16	8–8	6th	CBI First Round
2013–14	Danny Manning	21–13	13–3	T–1st	NCAA Division I Second Round
Danny Manning:		38–29	21–11		
Frank Haith (American Athletic Conference) (2014–2022)
2014–15	Frank Haith	23–11	14–4	2nd	NIT Second Round
2015–16	Frank Haith	20–12	12–6	T–3rd	NCAA Division I First Four
2016–17	Frank Haith	15–17	8–10	7th	
2017–18	Frank Haith	19–12	12–6	4th	
2018–19	Frank Haith	18–14	8–10	T–7th	
2019–20	Frank Haith	21–10	13–5	T–1st	No postseason held
2020–21	Frank Haith	11–11	7–7	7th	
2021–22	Frank Haith	11–20	4–14	10th	
Frank Haith:		138–108	78–64		
Eric Konkol (American Athletic / American Conference) (2022–present)
2022–23	Eric Konkol	5–25	1–17	11th	
2023–24	Eric Konkol	16–15	7–11	T–8th	
2024–25	Eric Konkol	13–20	6–12	T–9th	
2025–26	Eric Konkol	30–8	13–5	T–2nd	NIT Runner-Up
Eric Konkol:		64–68	27–45		
Total:		1,546–1,224 (.558)			
National champion Postseason invitational champion Conference regular season champion Conference regular season and conference tournament champion Division regular season champion Division regular season and conference tournament champion Conference tournament champion

^A.Bill Franey finished the season as interim coach, going 2–7 and 2–5 in conference. King began the season, going 6–12 and 3–6 in conference.
^B.Pooh Williamson finished the season as interim coach, going 7–15 and 5–13 in conference. Phillips began the season, going 2–2.
