= Bergen-Belsen (disambiguation) =

Bergen-Belsen may refer to:

- Stalag XI-C Bergen-Belsen (1940–1943), a German World War II prisoner-of-war camp
- Bergen-Belsen concentration camp (1942–1945), on the site of the prisoner-of-war camp
- Bergen-Belsen DP camp, a displaced persons camp set up by British forces in 1945 near the site of the concentration camp
- Belsen (Bergen)
