= Martin Bergen =

Martin Bergen or Marty Bergen may refer to:

- Martin V. Bergen (c. 1872–1941), American football player, coach, lawyer
- Marty Bergen (bridge) (born 1948), American bridge champion
- Marty Bergen (baseball) (1871–1900), Major League Baseball player
- Marty Bergen (jockey) (1869–1906), American National Champion jockey
