= Marty Bergen (baseball) =

American baseball player (1871–1900)

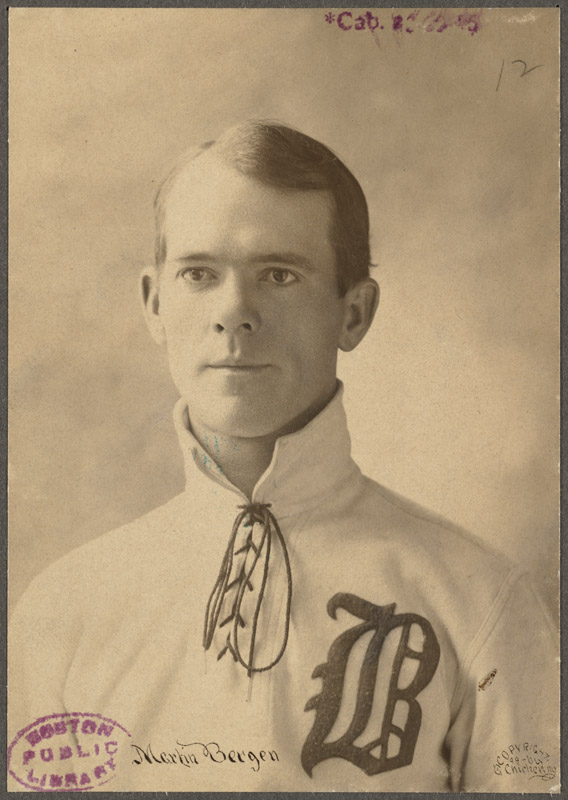
- Bergen, circa 1899
- Catcher
- Born: October 25, 1871; North Brookfield, Massachusetts, U.S.
- Died: January 19, 1900 (aged 28); North Brookfield, Massachusetts, U.S.
- Batted: Unknown Threw: Right

MLB debut
- April 17, 1896, for the Boston Beaneaters

Last MLB appearance
- October 15, 1899, for the Boston Beaneaters

MLB statistics
- Batting average: .265
- Home runs: 10
- Runs batted in: 176
- Stats at Baseball Reference

Teams
- Boston Beaneaters (1896–1899)

Martin Bergen (October 25, 1871 – January 19, 1900) was an American professional baseball player. From 1896 to 1899 he played in 344 games with the Boston Beaneaters of Major League Baseball (MLB), 337 of them as their catcher. Bergen helped the Beaneaters to National League pennants in 1897 and 1898, as well as a second-place finish in 1899.

Bergen appeared to have a mental illness. By 1899, he experienced hallucinations, had to be removed from a game due to odd behavior, and walked off from the team train during a trip to Boston. On January 19, 1900, he killed his wife and two children before dying by suicide.

A 2001 Sports Illustrated article described him as "a nimble fielder with a bullwhip arm who could snap the ball to second base without so much as moving his feet". In 1900, future Hall of Fame outfielder Jesse Burkett characterized Bergen as the best catcher in baseball history. He received a few Hall of Fame votes in 1937–1939, though not nearly enough to be elected.

== Early life ==
Martin Bergen was born to parents Michael and Ann on October 25, 1871, in North Brookfield, Massachusetts. His parents were Irish immigrants who had arrived in the United States just after the Civil War. Michael made an income for the family by making shoes at a local factory. Martin was the third of six children, all girls except for him and the youngest, Bill.

While still just a teenager, Marty was playing baseball for a local team, the Brookfields. One of his teammates was Connie Mack, who would later manage the Philadelphia Athletics for 50 years. Recognized as a great fielder, Bergen tended to obsess about minor problems and displayed an argumentative personality, traits that negatively affected his enjoyment of the game.

== Minor league career (1892–1895) ==
Bergen's professional baseball career started in 1892, when he served as the catcher for the Salem Witches of the New England League. He played 59 games for them, batting .247. Following their season, he returned to play some games for the Brookfields, a practice he would continue in subsequent years. He spent most of the 1893 season with a team in Northampton, though he also played three games for the Wilkes-Barre Coal Barons of the Eastern League. On July 11, still in the midst of the season, he married Hattie Gaines, who had moved to North Brookfield a year before to work at a flour mill. The couple had three children: Martin Jr., Florence, and Joseph. They kept their permanent residence in North Brookfield, purchasing real estate on Boynton Street, which they named Snowball Farm.

In 1894, Mack became the manager of the Pittsburgh Pirates of the National League (NL). He tried to draft Bergen, but the contract was voided when the Pirates assigned the catcher to a minor league team, a practice which major league teams were not allowed to do at the time. The minor league team was Lewiston of the New England League, for whom Bergen played even though he was no longer under contract with Pittsburgh. Playing 97 games, Bergen batted .321.

Teams at higher levels were interested in Bergen again in 1895. This time, they were the Washington Senators of the NL (major league) and the Kansas City Blues of the Western League (minor league), both of which drafted him. Baseball officials sent him to the Blues, where he had a strong performance in 1895. However, his moody behavior caused trouble. In the middle of the season, Bergen left the Blues suddenly over a perceived slight and did not return until over a week had passed. Nevertheless, he played 138 games for the club, batting .372 with 118 runs scored and 188 hits. Kid Nichols, who was from Kansas City, recommended the player to Frank Selee, manager of the Boston Beaneaters. The team drafted him and looked forward to employing him for 1896, though team owner Arthur Soden had to go to North Brookfield to assure Bergen he was wanted and valued by his new club.

== Boston Beaneaters (1896–1899) ==
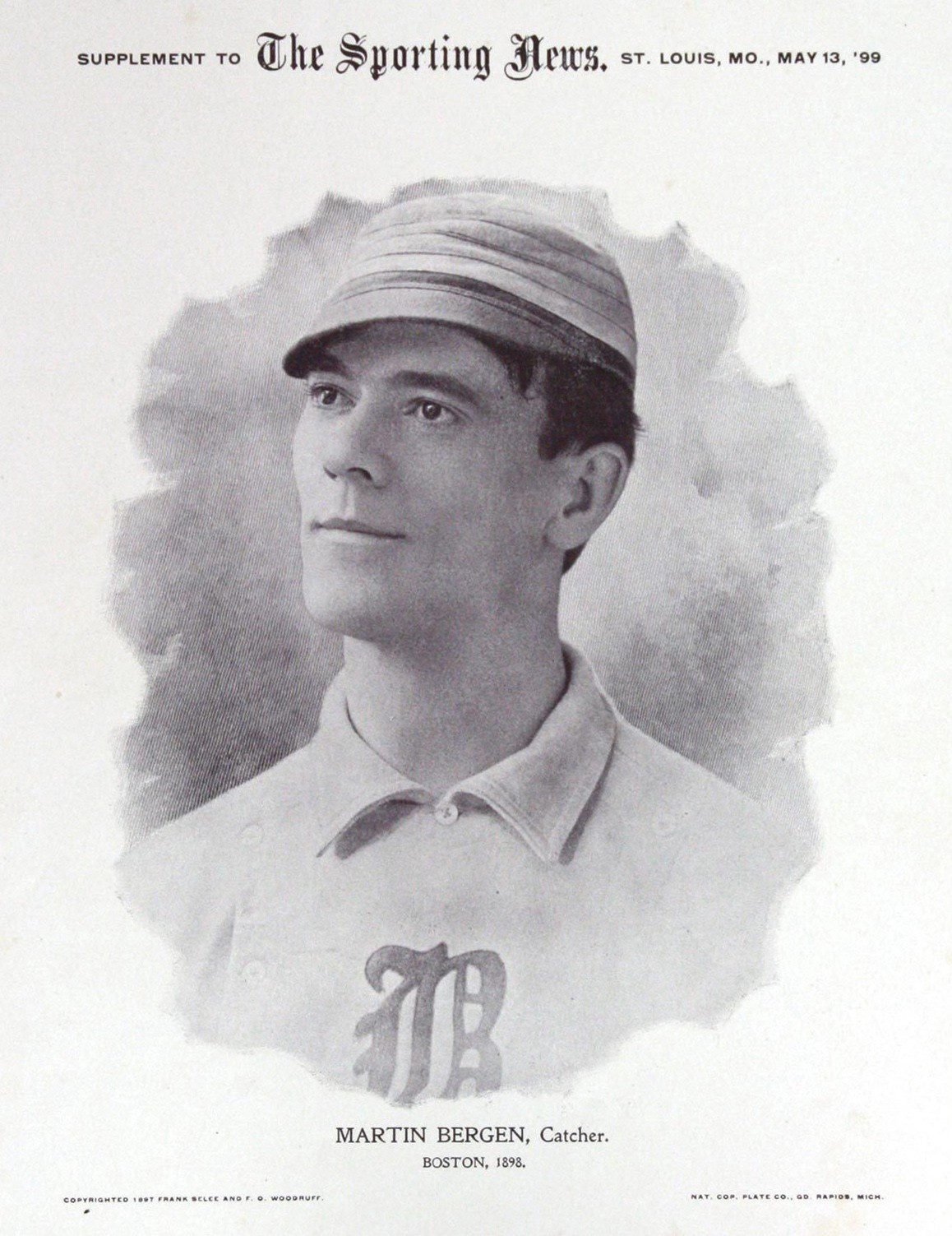
Portrait of Marty Bergen, catcher for the Boston Beaneaters

With the Beaneaters, Bergen became one of the two main catchers for the ballclub in 1896, alongside Charlie Ganzel. Bergen made his first major league appearance on April 17 in a 7–3 loss to the Phillies at the Philadelphia Baker Bowl. Catching 65 games for the Beaneaters in his rookie season (18 more appearances than Ganzel), he batted .269 with 39 runs scored, 66 hits, four home runs, and 47 runs batted in (RBI). His team finished fourth in the NL.

In 1897, Bergen received a greater share of the catching duties, playing 87 games to Ganzel's 30; a third catcher, Fred Lake, only made 19 appearances. Bergen batted .248 with 47 runs scored, 81 hits, two home runs, and 45 RBI. With a record of 93–39, the Beaneaters won the NL pennant after a three-year absence. They then faced the Baltimore Orioles in the Temple Cup, an 1890s series that pitted the first-place NL team against the second-place NL team in a best-of-seven postseason series to determine the league champion. Despite having the better record, the Beaneaters lost the series four games to one.

The 1898 season saw Bergen set a number of career highs. He played in 125 games, catching 117 of them; backup George Yeager only caught 37. Bergen batted .280 with 62 runs scored, 125 hits, three home runs, and 60 RBI. The Beaneaters won the NL pennant for the second year in a row, facing no challenge for the championship this year, as 1897 was the last year of the Temple Cup. Nichols credited Bergen with helping the team win: "Baltimore beat us the next three years, after we lost (catcher Charlie) Bennett. Then we got Marty Bergen from Kansas City and won the pennants again in 1897 and 1898."

Bergen had been troubled by right hip issues throughout his career, and on January 28, 1899, he had surgery to address an abscess on the hip. That season, he only played 72 games, with Boileryard Clarke (60) and Billy Sullivan (22) also chipping in. He batted .258 with 32 runs scored, 67 hits, one home run, and 34 RBI. Though there were rumors that he broke his hip during the year, evidence suggests otherwise. Bergen played all nine innings of the team's second-to-last game of the year on October 13 and did not mention a broken hip in a visit to his doctor after the season. The Beaneaters had a 95–57 record but finished second in the NL this time, behind the Brooklyn Superbas. The Sandusky Star and The Bangor Daily Whig and Courier pinned the blame for the second-place finish on a rift that had developed between the sullen Bergen and his teammates. For years, Andrew Freedman, owner of the New York Giants, had been interested in acquiring the catcher in a trade, and most people within the game of baseball believed Bergen would be a Giant in 1900.

Over four seasons, Bergen played in 344 major league games for the Beaneaters, 337 of which came at the catcher position. He had a career batting average of .265 with 180 runs scored, 339 hits, 69 extra base hits, 10 home runs, and 176 RBI.

== Defensive prowess ==
Bergen's defensive skills helped him earn a reputation as one of, if not the best, catchers in the NL during his tenure. He exhibited a strong arm and quick reflexes, which helped him throw out baserunners. Mack said Bergen was the only catcher he ever saw remain on his knees to throw a player out at second. William Nack of Sports Illustrated wrote in 2001 that Bergen was "a nimble fielder with a bullwhip arm who could snap the ball to second base without so much as moving his feet." Although catchers in his day did not wear shin guards, Bergen was particularly skilled at blocking the plate when a runner was trying to score from third. This involved him in several collisions, none of which seriously injured him.

Future Hall of Famer Jesse Burkett remembered Bergen's skills with high praise in 1900: "As a catcher, Martin Bergen was the best the world ever produced. No man acted with more natural grace as a ballplayer. There was finish in every move he made. His eye was always true, and his movements so quick and accurate in throwing that the speediest base runners [...] never took chances when Bergen was behind the bat." The infielders that played with him spoke glowingly of his abilities. Said second baseman Bobby Lowe, "Bergen's throws were always strong and very rarely, if ever, sailed. He positioned himself behind the plate as well as any catcher I have ever seen." Wrote a sportswriter in 1898, "Martin Bergen is a kingpin of catchers, and without him the Bostons would be probably in second place or even lower down the ladder."

== Mental illness ==
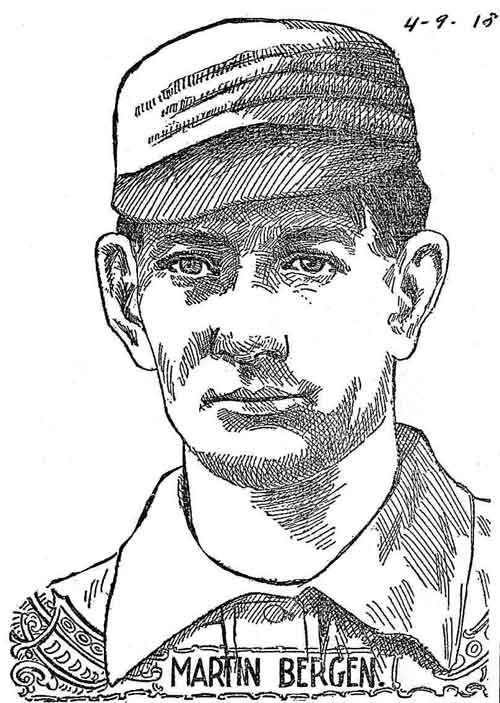
Drawing of Bergen in his baseball uniform

Bergen's teammates appreciated his strong arm and hustling style of play, but relations between the catcher and the team soured quickly. An article from May 1896 related how "Martin Bergen, the young backstop [...] is unpopular with his fellow players on the Boston team. Bergen is a sullen, sarcastic chap, never associates with the players, and always nurses a fancied grievance. His disposition handicaps his playing talents." While the team was on a road trip to St. Louis in 1898, Bergen slapped teammate Vic Willis while the ballclub was eating breakfast. He threatened to club his teammates to death at the end of the year. The team's mixed emotions were expressed by an anonymous Boston player quoted in the press: "He has made trouble with a good many of the boys and we just give him a wide berth. But he's a ballplayer, and once we get into a game, personal feelings are set aside in admiration of the artist, for such he is."

Bergen's condition worsened in 1899, which led to internal turmoil for the Beaneaters. His January hip surgery took over four hours, and he seemed different mentally afterwards. He was having hallucinations that enemies were trying to poison him. The Beaneaters started the year by playing 16 of their first 17 games on the road; in the midst of this trip, while they were playing the Senators in Washington on April 24, Bergen found out that Martin Jr. had died of diphtheria. Soden and manager Frank Selee granted him time off until he felt recovered enough to rejoin the team; Bergen was back with the club after two weeks. Though his teammates tried to welcome him back, Bergen continued to clash with them, imagining that they were making jokes behind his back about the death. He began sitting sideways and walking in a particular manner so that he could spot assassins approaching from either side of him. Boston's team president urged the other players to avoid Bergen, fearing what he might do. Some blamed his condition on heavy drink, but Bergen was regarded by others as a teetotaler.

On July 20, 1899, Bergen silently walked off the team's train at the beginning of a road trip, returning to North Brookfield and leaving Boston with just a backup catcher (Clarke) during a heated pennant race. Boston Globe reporter Tim Murnane journeyed to North Brookfield to convince Bergen to come back; the catcher complained that his teammates were mistreating him, that Selee would not give him time off to be with his family, and that he was battling injuries that could only be dealt with by his local physician, Dr. Louis Dionne. A week and a half later, he rejoined the team, receiving lusty cheers from the fans. In September, Bergen disappeared again for a few days, then showed up unannounced a few minutes before a game and put on his catching gear without speaking to anyone. On October 9, Bergen had to be removed from a game when he dodged the pitches rather than catching them, claiming that he was preoccupied with avoiding knife thrusts from an invisible assailant. Bergen was aware of his mental state, and actively sought help from both clergy and physicians. However, he refused to take any of the bromides prescribed by his doctor, explaining, "I thought someone in the National League had found out that you were my family physician and had arranged to give me some poison. I did not take it from my wife because I didn't wish hers to be the hand that poisoned me."

Kaense, Spahn, and Johnson's 2004 book on the Boston Braves recounts that, after Bergen's son's death, the player "would catch a few games, then ask Selee if he could return home for a few days." When Selee refused permission, Bergen would go home anyway. Bergen complained that players kept reminding him of his son who had died, and he resented a $300 fine imposed for being AWOL. "Black moods came on Bergen who seemed to be happy only when on his farm in North Brookfield." Most of his teammates were avoiding him completely by the end of the year, and several players said they would not return to the Beaneaters in 1900 if the increasingly erratic Bergen was still with the club.

== Death ==
In January 1900, at his home in North Brookfield, Massachusetts, the 28-year-old Bergen was found dead in a murder–suicide. Neighbors expressed shock and said they saw no warning signs. Several had seen him before the tragedy unfolded, and recalled him as "unusually cheerful" and "pleasant" when conversing with them. The neighbors also told reporters how devoted he always seemed to his wife. The medical examiner reported that Bergen killed his wife and two children with an axe, then used a straight razor to forcefully cut his own throat. Bergen's father discovered the bodies. According to The New York Times:

The little boy [Bergen's 3-year-old son] was lying on the floor with a large wound in the head. Mrs. Bergen's skull was terribly crushed, having evidently been struck more than one blow by the infuriated husband. The appearance of the little girl [his 6-year-old daughter found on the kitchen floor next to Bergen] also showed that a number of savage blows had been rained upon the top and side of her head. Bergen's throat had been cut with a razor, and the head was nearly severed.

In actuality, the razor cut likely would not have been able to sever enough ligaments to go deep enough to nearly sever Bergen's head, but it would have created a lot of blood from slicing the jugular vein and carotid artery, making it appear that the head had been nearly severed from the body.

Following Bergen's death, media outlets reported that he had been subject to "fits of melancholy" and "showed signs of insanity" in the fall of 1899. After examining contemporary accounts, the Harvard Medical School's Dr. Carl Salzman felt that Bergen likely had schizophrenia with possible manic depression. Baseball historian Frank Russo wrote, "If he were alive today, he most surely would be diagnosed with some sort of clinical depression or perhaps borderline personality disorder," adding that he was showing strong signs of schizophrenia in late 1899.

Bergen and his wife and children were buried at Saint Joseph's Cemetery on Bell Street in North Brookfield; his grave remained unmarked for several years. In 1934, Mack and George M. Cohan, both of whom had ties to North Brookfield, helped raise funds to erect a granite memorial to Bergen. The inscription reads: "In memory of Martin Bergen, 1871–1900. Member of the Boston National League Club. Erected in appreciation of his contribution to American's national game." Bergen received a few Hall of Fame votes in 1937–39, though not nearly enough to be elected. Sportswriter Joe Posnanski mentioned this when he argued that the Hall of Fame needs to strike the character clause from its membership requirements. Baseball writer Bill James, commenting on why a few writers might have voted for Bergen, wrote, "He wasn't any kind of a player, really, and one supposes that a couple of writers had remembered him because of his headline-making exit and, lacking any kind of meaningful reference books, had romanticized his defensive play to spectacular proportions."

The death of Bergen prevented him from ever playing against his brother Bill, who was also a major league catcher for the Cincinnati Reds and the Brooklyn Superbas from 1901 to 1911. Several years after the murder–suicide, Bill reminisced to a reporter about his brother. "It was as if he was possessed. The demons got to him and never let him go."

== See also ==
- List of baseball players who died during their careers
