= Charlie Ganzel =

American baseball player (1862–1914)

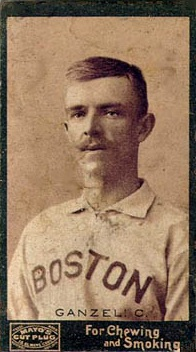
- 1895 Mayo Cut Plug (N300) Baseball Card
- Catcher / Infielder / Outfielder
- Born: June 18, 1862; Waterford, Wisconsin, U.S.
- Died: April 17, 1914 (aged 51); Quincy, Massachusetts, U.S.
- Batted: Right Threw: Right

MLB debut
- September 27, 1884, for the St. Paul Saints

Last MLB appearance
- September 21, 1897, for the Boston Beaneaters

MLB statistics
- Batting average: .259
- Home runs: 10
- Runs batted in: 412
- Stats at Baseball Reference

Teams
- St. Paul Saints (1884); Philadelphia Quakers (1885–1886); Detroit Wolverines (1886–1888); Boston Beaneaters (1889–1897)

Charles William Ganzel (June 18, 1862 – April 7, 1914) was an American professional baseball player from 1884 to 1897. He played 14 seasons in Major League Baseball, principally as a catcher, for four major league clubs. His most extensive playing time came with the Detroit Wolverines (209 games, 1886–1888) and Boston Beaneaters (536 games, 1889–1897). He was a member of five teams that won National League pennants, one in Detroit (1887) and four in Boston (1891–93, 1897).

A right-handed batter and thrower, Ganzel appeared in 786 major league games, 579 as a catcher, 120 as an infielder and 100 as an outfielder. He compiled a .259 batting average with 774 hits and 412 RBIs. His total of 229 career errors as catcher is the 30th highest in major league history, and his total of 180 passed balls ranks 53rd.

== Early years ==
Ganzel was born in Waterford, Wisconsin, in 1862. His parents, Charles Ganzel, Sr. (1837–1916) and Elizabeth (Lassman) Ganzel (1840–1911), moved the family to Kalamazoo, Michigan, in 1887. Ganzel reportedly played several years of independent baseball in the Midwest before his major league career began in 1884.

== Professional baseball ==
=== St. Paul ===
Ganzel began the 1884 season playing for the St. Paul Apostles in the Northwestern League. He appeared in 57 games for the Apostles, 41 as a catcher, and compiled a .189 batting average in 212 at bats.

Late in the 1884 season, the Apostles joined the short-lived Union Association as a replacement team, were renamed the St. Paul Saints and briefly became a major league team. Ganzel made his major league debut on September 27, 1884 with the newly renamed Saints and appeared in seven of the team's eight major league games, compiling a .217 batting average. The Saints compiled a 2-6 major league record, and the Union Association disbanded at the end of the 1884 season.

=== Philadelphia ===
In 1885, Ganzel played with the Philadelphia Quakers (later renamed the Phillies) managed by Harry Wright. Ganzel appeared in 33 games as catcher, sharing catching duties with Jack Clements who caught 41 games. Ganzel hit poorly for Philadelphia, compiling a .168 batting average that was 73 points below the National League average for 1885.

Ganzel began the 1886 season with the Phillies, but the Phillies had acquired Deacon McGuire, still had Jack Clements and were amply stocked with catchers. Accordingly, Ganzel was released after appearing in only one game with the 1886 Quakers.

=== Detroit ===
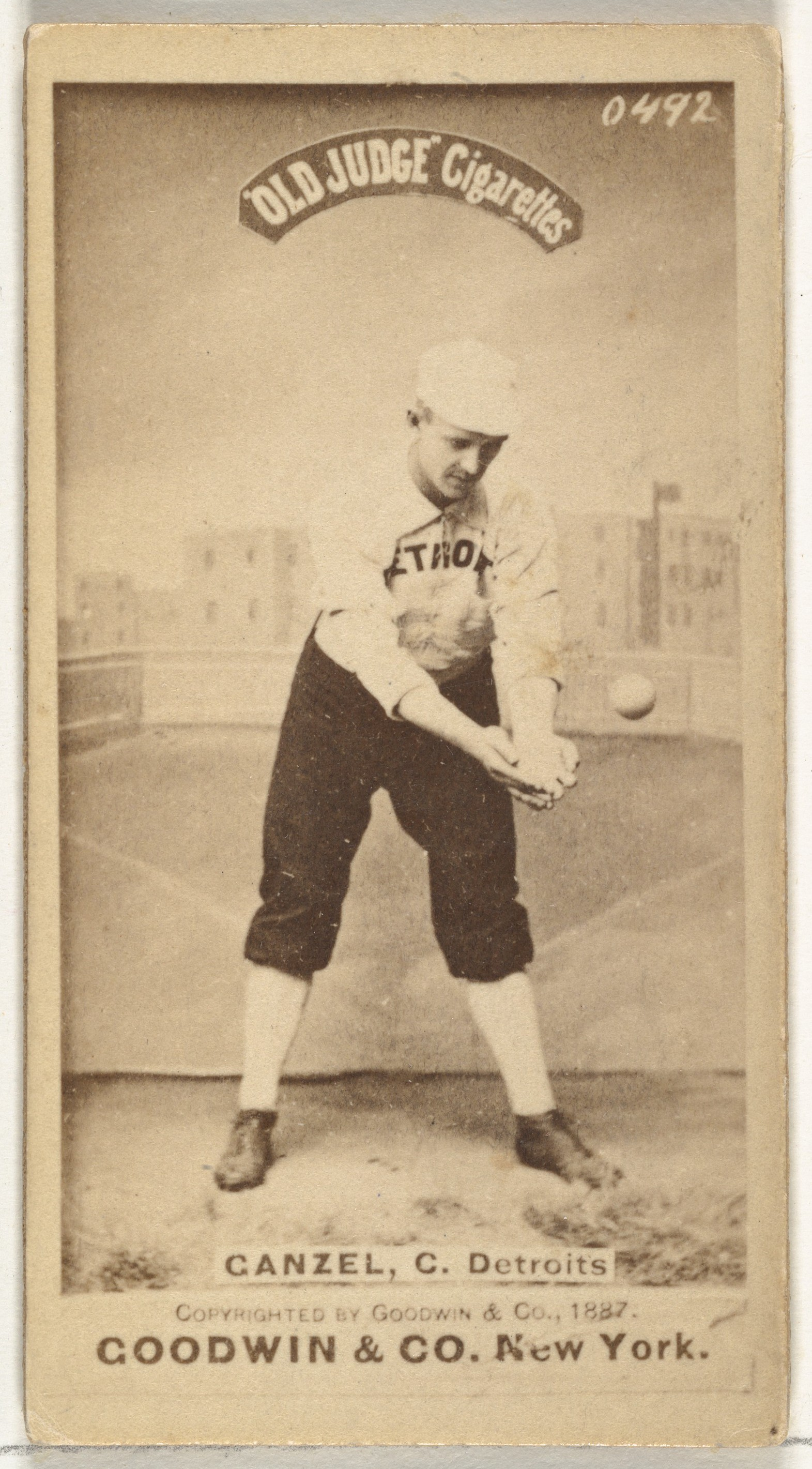
Charles William "Charlie" Ganzel, 1887, Burdick Collection, Metropolitan Museum of Art

After Ganzel's release by the Phillies, he was signed by manager Bill Watkins of the Detroit Wolverines. Within days of the signing, Detroit's correspondent to the Sporting Life was praising Ganzel and thanking Philadelphia:

"Philadelphia has earned Detroit's sincere thanks. In Ganzel we have secured a first-class catcher. He is a jewel and will prove a splendid substitute for Charley Bennett. Ganzel was put in to catch the first game with Kansas City. He is an artistic catcher, and at once sprang into high favor with the audience. He accepted all his nine chances, threw Paul Rodford out at second twice, made a timely hit and a run. Once more, Philadelphia, thank you.

Ganzel remained with the Wolverines for three seasons, serving principally in a backup role to Charlie Bennett.

Ganzel appeared in 45 games as catcher for the 1886 Detroit Wolverines team that compiled an 87-36 record and finished in second place in a close pennant race with Chicago. Defensively, Ganzel struggled in his first season at Detroit, committing 37 errors in only 45 games as catcher—the fourth highest total among the league's catchers. Offensively, Ganzel improved dramatically with a .272 batting average that was more than 100 points higher than his prior year's tally. Ganzel's performance also earned him a Wins Above Replacement (WAR) rating of 1.1 for 1886.

The 1887 season was the pinnacle in the history of the Detroit Wolverines. The team won the National League pennant with a 79-45 record and then defeated the St. Louis Browns in the 1887 World Series. Ganzel's playing time increased to 51 games as catcher, six more than Charlie Bennett's 45 games. Ganzel's defensive play improved in 1887. He reduced his error count from 37 to 33 while appearing in more games, and his 6.78 range factor was the third highest among the National League's catchers. On the offensive side, he hit .260 in 227 at bats. In the 1887 World Series, Ganzel scored five runs, had 13 hits in 58 at bats and stole three bases.

In 1888, Ganzel appeared in a career high 95 games. He was used at multiple positions, playing 49 games at second base, 28 as catcher, nine at third base, five in the outfield, three at shortstop and one at first base. Statistically, he also had the best year of his career. In a 14-year major league career, Ganzel achieved a WAR rating above 1.0 only twice—a 1.1 rating in 1886 and a 1.7 rating in 1888. He compiled a .249 batting average and collected 46 RBIs and 12 stolen bases. Unfortunately, Ganzel's best season came while the Wolverines were in decline, finishing in fifth place with a 68-63 record. With high salaries owed to the team's star players, and gate receipts declining markedly, the team folded in October 1888 with the players being sold to other teams. On October 16, 1888, the Wolverines sold Ganzel along with Charlie Bennett, Dan Brouthers, Hardy Richardson and Deacon White to the Boston Beaneaters for an estimated $30,000.

=== Boston ===
Ganzel played nine seasons and appeared in 536 games with the Boston Beaneaters from 1889 to 1897. During the 1889 to 1893 seasons, Ganzel continued to serve as the backup to Charlie Bennett, with whom he had played in Detroit.

Ganzel's most productive seasons in Boston were 1891 and 1892 when he appeared in 59 and 51 games at catcher, earned WAR ratings of 0.9 in both years, and helped the Beaneaters win consecutive National League pennants. He was also a member of two more pennant-winning teams in Boston, in 1892 and again in 1897.

In January 1894, Charlie Bennett lost both of his legs in a train accident, and Ganzel took over as the Beaneaters' number one catcher for the 1894 and 1895 seasons. Ganzel compiled career highs in 1894 in batting average (.278), runs (51), triples (6), home runs (3) and RBIs (56).

The tragic Marty Bergen, whose life ended in a bloody murder-suicide in January 1900, took over as Boston's number one catcher in 1896 and 1897, with Ganzel again fulfilling a backup role. Ganzel appeared in his last major league game on September 21, 1897.

=== Baseball family ===
Ganzel was part of a baseball family. His son, Babe Ganzel, was an outfielder who played with the Senators from 1927 to 1928, and his younger brother John Ganzel was a first baseman for the Pittsburgh Pirates, Chicago Cubs, New York Giants, New York Highlanders and Cincinnati Reds from 1898 to 1908, and also managed the Reds and the Federal League Tip-Tops between 1908 and 1915. Two brothers and two sons also played in the minor leagues.

== Later years ==
After retiring from baseball in 1897, Ganzel managed a shirt factory in Boston. He also remained active in coaching and organizing baseball teams around New England. He married Alice Maude Cartee of Dubuque, Iowa, in 1885. They had two daughters and six sons. Ganzel lived in Quincy, Massachusetts, for many years. He died from cancer in 1914 at the home of his daughter in the Norfolk Downs section of Quincy. He was buried at Mount Wollaston Cemetery in Quincy.
