= Stalag XI-C =

World War II German prisoner-of-war camp

Stalag 311/XI-C
- Bergen, Lower Saxony

Site information
- Type: Prisoner-of-war camp
- Controlled by: Nazi Germany

Location
- Coordinates: 52°45′48.13″N 9°53′42.43″E

Site history
- In use: 1941–1943
- Battles/wars: World War II

Garrison information
- Occupants: Soviet prisoners of war

Stalag XI-C Bergen-Belsen, initially called Stalag 311, was a German Army prisoner-of-war camp located near the town of Bergen in Lower Saxony.

== Timeline ==
- May 1940: The camp was built to house Belgian and French enlisted men captured in the Battle of France; initial count: 600.
- July 1941: About 5,000 Soviet prisoners captured during Operation Barbarossa arrived from the Oflag 52 and Oflag 53 camps. They were housed in the open while huts were being built. By the spring of 1942 an estimated 18,000 had died of hunger and disease, mainly typhus fever.
- August 1941: About 3,000 Soviet POWs arrived from the Oflag 56 camp.
- August 1941: Hospital for sick and injured POWs opened.
- October 1941: 11,000 POWs arrived, including from Stalag 333. Some POWs were moved to the Stalag XI-A, Stalag XI-D and Oflag XIII-D camps.
- November 1941: 1,000 POWs arrived, captured at Vyazma and Yelnya.
- December 1941: Some POWs sent to the Stalag XI-A and Stalag XI-B camps.
- Until April 1942, some 14,000 POWs died in the camp from typhus, starvation and cold.
- April 1943: Part of the camp is turned into a hospital for POWs. The remainder of the camp is separated and taken over by the SS to house Jews ostensibly for shipment overseas in exchange for German civilians.
- Late 1943: The POW camp is closed and the entire facility becomes Bergen-Belsen concentration camp

== Sources ==
- Official web-site of the Bergen-Belsen memorial
- Official list of Stalags in German.
