= Bergen, Hesse =

Bergen
- Village of Frankfurt
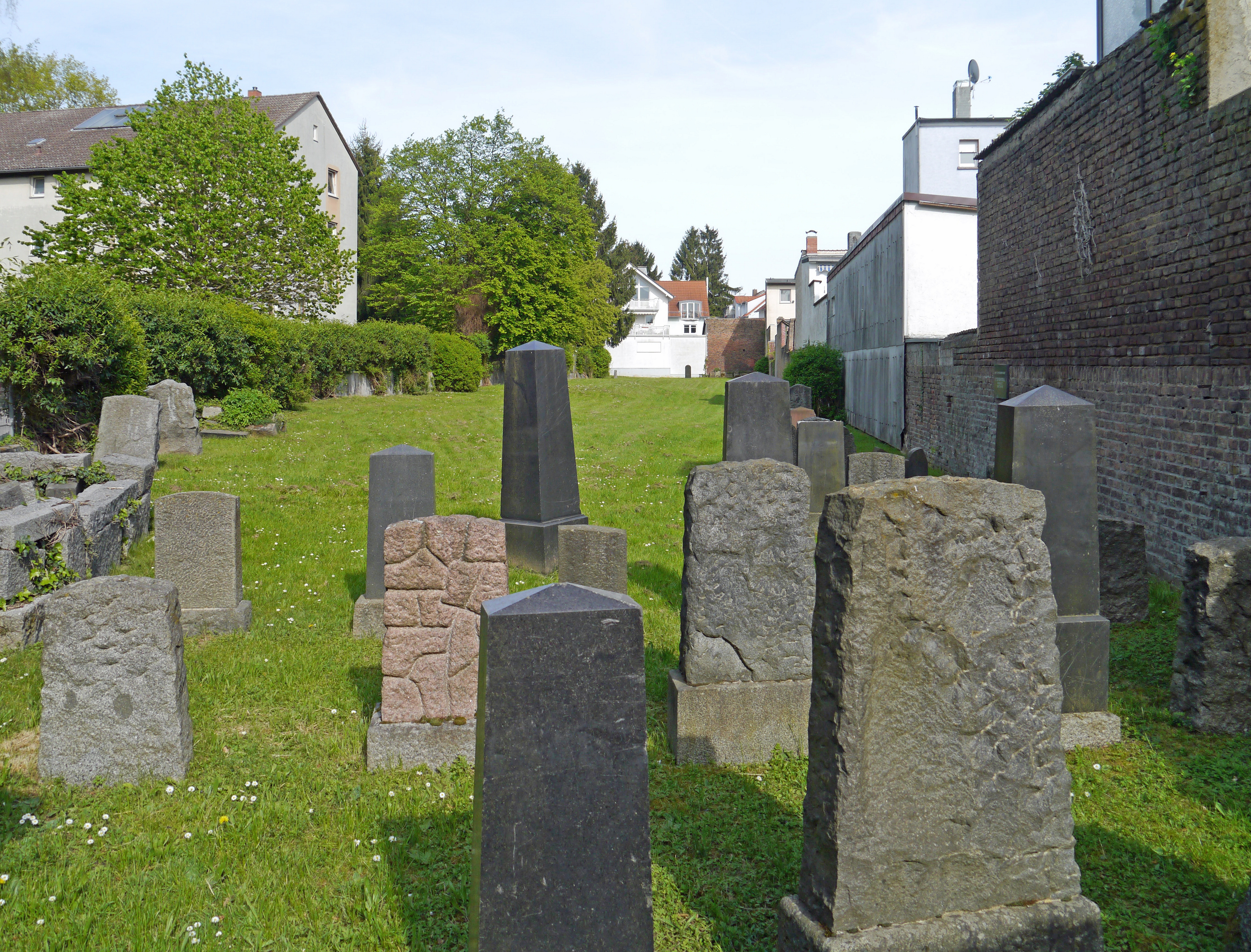
- Interactive map of Bergen
- Location within Germany Location within Hesse
- Coordinates: 50°09′18″N 8°44′58″E
- Country: Germany
- State: Hesse
- City: Frankfurt
- Borough: Bergen-Enkheim
- Time zone: UTC+01:00 (CET)
  - Summer (DST): UTC+02:00 (CEST)

Bergen (German pronunciation: [ˈbɛʁɡn̩]) is a former municipality in Hesse, Germany. Presently, it is part of Bergen-Enkheim, a borough of Frankfurt. It was the location of the Battle of Bergen (Seven Years' War).

During the election of Leopold II, Holy Roman Emperor, Bergen was the location of an encampment, organized by Count Wilhelm IX. of Hessen to protect the electoral city Frankfurt am Main and the electoral college assembled there.
