= Bergen, Wisconsin =

Bergen is the name of some places in the U.S. state of Wisconsin:

- Bergen, Marathon County, Wisconsin, a town
- Bergen, Rock County, Wisconsin, an unincorporated community
- Bergen, Vernon County, Wisconsin, a town
