= Helen Corinne Bergen =

American author and journalist

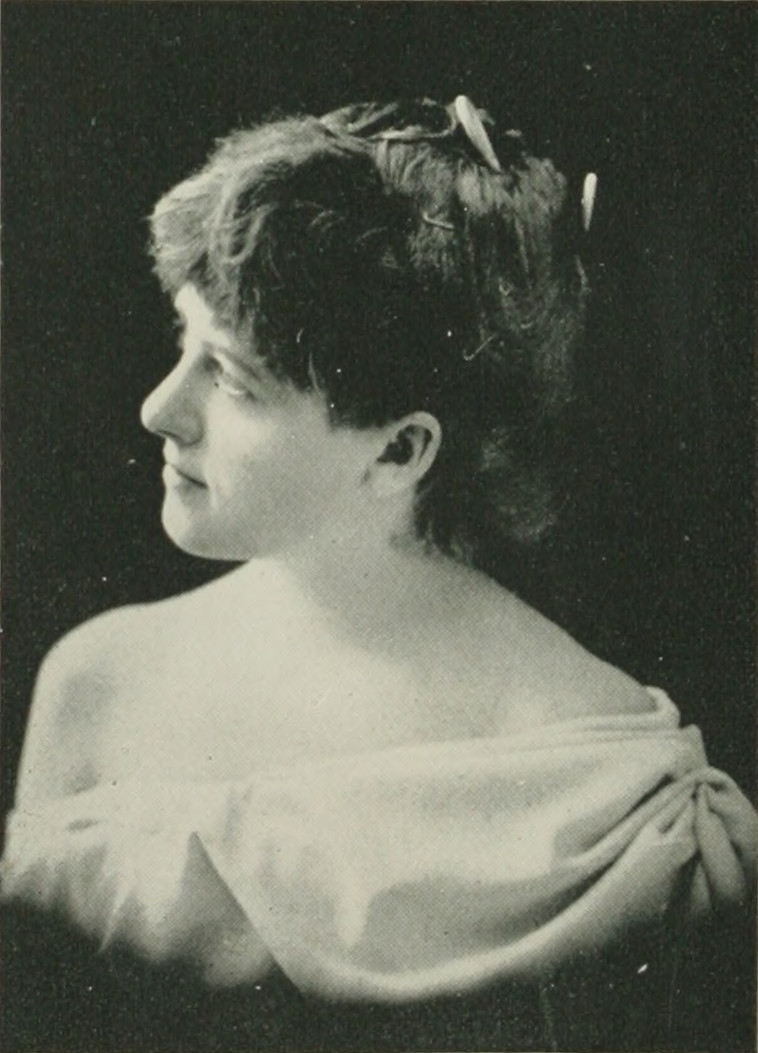
Helen Corinne Bergen

Helen Corinne Bergen (October 14, 1868 – ?) was an American author and journalist, as well as a musical and dramatic critic. She made elocution one of her principal studies, and appeared at several private concerts as Parthenia in Ingomar, the Barbarian. Her poems appeared in several prominent papers, and received favorable mention from the press and public. Bergen was well-known to the press in Washington, D.C., New York City, and at Lansing, Michigan. She believed in equal pay for equal work by men and women.

== Early life and education ==
Helen ("Nellie") Corinne Bergen was born in Delanco, New Jersey, October 14, 1868. She belonged to the Bergen family that came from Norway and settled in New Jersey in 1618, in the place they called Bergen. Her mother, Ella (Winner) Bergen, was the daughter of the Rev. Isaac Winner, D.D., a preacher in the New Jersey Conference of the Methodist Episcopal Church. Her father was Colonel George B. Bergen, one of the prominent politicians of Michigan, When a child, Bergen lived in Washington, D.C., and Philadelphia, and at four years of age, came to East Saginaw, Michigan. Graduating in 1887 from high school, she continued her studies for one year at St. Clair, Michigan.

== Michigan ==
In Michigan, she began writing for the newspapers. She later lived in Washington, D.C., Louisiana, and Texas, working for The Washington Post and various periodicals like The American Magazine and southern newspapers. She was the Post's children's department editor and also wrote music and drama criticism, poetry, sketches, and stories.

== Louisiana ==
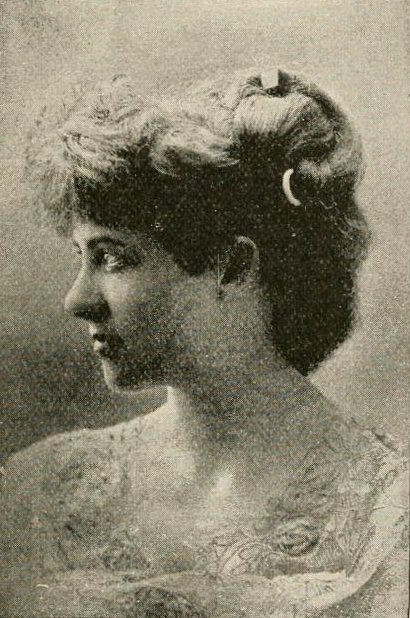
Nellie Corinne Bergen (1892)

In 1890, being in delicate health after her first social season at Saginaw, Michigan, Bergen's mother sent her daughter to Louisiana to regain her strength. Bergen was engaged at the time to E. Stanton Bliss, her first and childhood's love, and a nephew of Col. Aaron T. Bliss, formerly Congressman from Michigan. Bergen was introduced to George Carter Brush in a hotel while she was recuperating at a sanitarium at Ruston, Louisiana. On May 1, 1890, after an acquaintance of thirty-six hours, they married at Ruston. Mr. Brush admitted that the marriage was the result of impulse, and a divorce was obtained in 1892, contrary to the wishes of Bergen, but with the approval of Bergen's father.

== New York ==
There followed four years of literary output while Bergen work in New York from 1892 to 1896. When Jack Comes Late, a "comedy monologue for a lady", was published in 1893. In 1894, prospectuses appeared for a new "contemporary review" entitled The Stiletto and the Rose for which Bergen was to be the editor and manager. It intended to focus on articles dealing with leading questions of the day, poetry, and reviews, but it appears that it never actually got off the ground.

Bergen met the Viscount Arnoult George Langlois de Brunner in New York, where he was a confidential clerk in the Standard National Bank. He moved in the best society, to which his natural and family titles entitled him. During the clandestine courtship, Bergen became quite ill, suffering severely from influenza, and the vicomte felt that his place was at the bedside of his fiancée. On April 2, 1896, in New York City, she married the viscount. This marriage was without the knowledge of the families of the bride and bridegroom, as it was agreed to keep the matter quiet until a special dispensation could be obtained from the pope, when it was intended to recelebrate the marriage in Washington, D.C., at the home of Bergen's family. The dispensation was necessary because of Bergen's 1892 divorce, and as the Viscomte Langlois de Brunner was a Catholic, his marriage would not have been possible other than by such dispensation. On April 14, she was sent by her husband, on account of her ill-health and upon the advice of her mother, to stay with relatives at Bayonne, New Jersey. Two weeks later, she returned to New York City, but again becoming ill, went to the residence of Dr. Goodman for treatment.

== Washington, D.C. ==
Having recovered, on May 25, 1896, she came to Washington, D.C. She was later informed that on the same day, her husband left New York for parts unknown.

During one of the periodical absences of the viscount from Bergen's apartments, Bergen's uncle had her removed to a private sanitarium, wholly unaware of the true relations between the viscount and his wife. The shock of this added to her severe illness, and brought about an attack of delirium, which necessitated treatment for dementia. The conflictions were aggravated by Bergen having been under contract for newspaper and magazine articles, but conscious that it was impossible to reveal the true state of affairs.

After release from the sanitarium, she came to Washington, D.C., during the winter of 1896-97, apparently having lost all recollection of what occurred during her last sickness. For six months, her life was a blank, and at the end of that time, looking over her papers, she came across the marriage certificate. She immediately wrote to the president of the Standard National Bank, but received the news that Langlois de Brunner had left New York soon after Bergen's disappearance, and he left no explanation of his movements. Bergen acquainted her mother with the facts and requested that they be published. This was done, and Bergen attempted to re-enter the journalistic field.

On February 12, 1897, Bergen told her friends that it was her intention to convert to her husband's religion, to which she would devote all her own means and the fortune which would come to her at the death of her grandmother and great-uncle. This decision was considered remarkable as Bergen had declined a marriage proposal from Frances J. A. Speet, a prominent squire of Bishop's Stortford, Hertfordshire, England, because of his conversion to the Catholic faith. It was expected that Bergen's announcement would apprise the viscount of the whereabouts of his bride. Though she had had a vague recollection that the viscount had mentioned his intention to go to Cuba, she had an abiding faith in the return of her husband. She forwarded a telegram to President William McKinley, asking him "politics aside" if he would aid the insurgents. This was regarded at the time as an eccentricity or perhaps a deep interest in the cause from the fact that she believed her absent husband went to Cuba to join the insurgent army.

On February 28, 1897, while with friends, she tore her hair and cut up parts of her dress into shreds. Her brother, who was on business in Washington, D.C., and her family physician were sent for, and it was deemed appropriate to send Bergen to the Emergency Hospital. The hospital superintendent felt that Bergen might become violently insane and admitted her. One of her hallucinations was that she was in Cuba fighting the Spanish army. On March 1, she made diagrams of imaginary battlefields in Cuba and wrote notes to prominent persons. On March 2, her friends thought it best to remove Bergen to St. Elizabeth's Asylum (now known as St. Elizabeths Hospital) where she was admitted on the advice of relatives and her physician.

By December 1897, Bergen showed signs of improvement in her mental health. On December 21, with an escort, she visited several stores in Washington, D.C., and told her attendant that she would not be returning to St. Elizabeth's Asylum. Taken to police headquarters, it was explained to her that she had been sent to St. Elizabeth's Asylum in a lawful manner and the only way she could earn her liberty was by proving her sanity. She then agreed to return to the asylum.

In November 1898, Bergen filed for divorce, alleging desertion and abandonment on the part of her husband, beginning May 25, 1896, and that she was unable to ascertain his whereabouts. The divorce was secured April 3, 1899.

The dramatic poem, The Princess Adelaide, was published in book form in 1900.

She married Sumner M. Curtis in 1901. Curtis was the Washington correspondent for the Milwaukee Sentinel and the New York Herald.
