= 1887 World Series =

Pre-modern baseball championship

1887 World's Championship Series
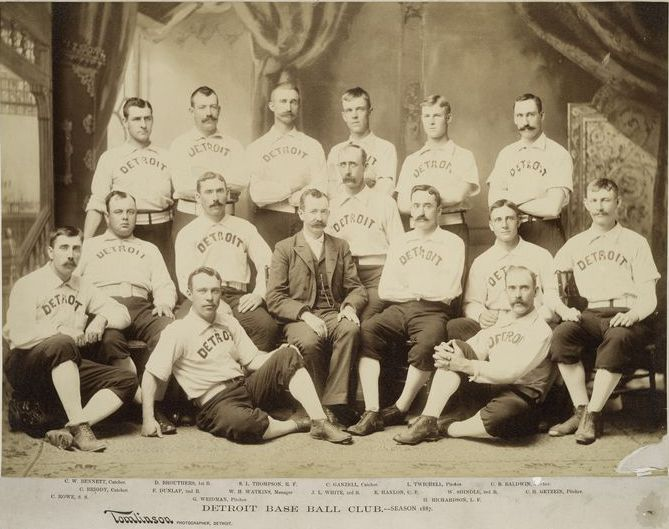
- 1887 Detroit Wolverines
Team (Wins)	Manager(s)	Season
Detroit Wolverines (10)	Bill Watkins	79–45–3 (.634), GA: 3½
St. Louis Browns (5)	Charles Comiskey	95–40–3 (.699), GA: 14
- Dates: October 10–26
- Venue(s): Recreation Park (Detroit); Sportsman's Park (St. Louis)

The 1887 World Series was won by the Detroit Wolverines of the National League, over the St. Louis Browns of the American Association, 10 games to 5. It was played between October 10 and 26, in numerous neutral cities, as well as in Detroit and St. Louis. Detroit clinched the series in game 11.

This Series was part of the pre-modern World Series, an annual competition between the champion of the National League and the champion of the American Association.

The Wolverines, who had been in the League since 1881, had spent a significant sum of money to bring star players to Detroit for the 1887 season and the investment paid off with a championship, but not in money. Detroit was not yet the Motor City, and was not ready to support major league baseball. The 1887 champions folded after the 1888 season.

== World Championship summary ==
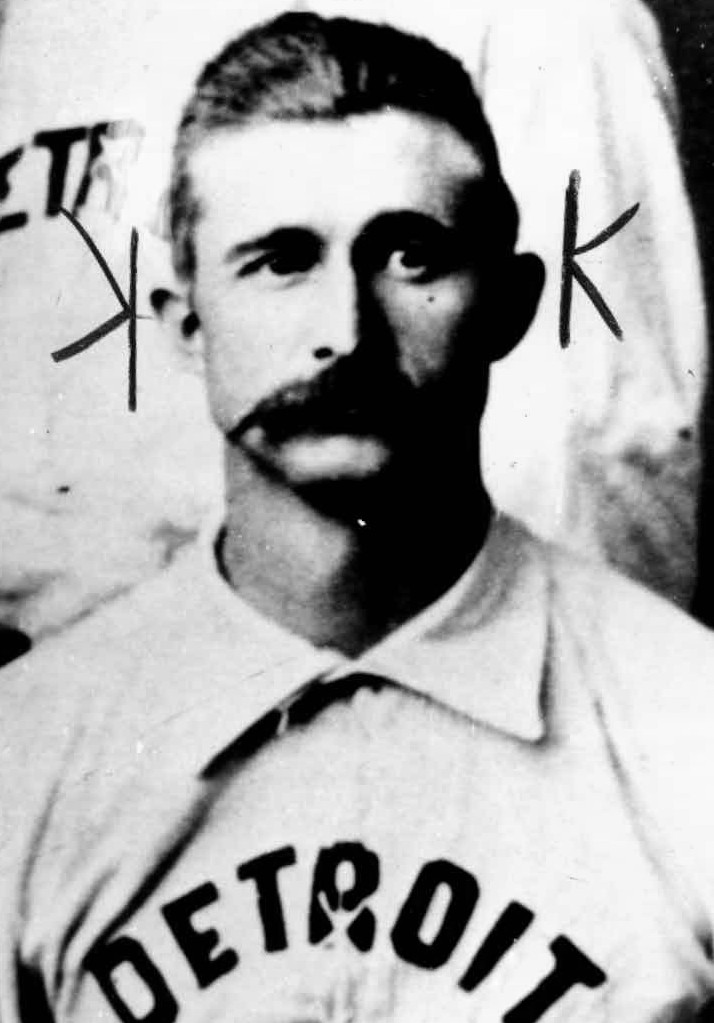
Sam Thompson

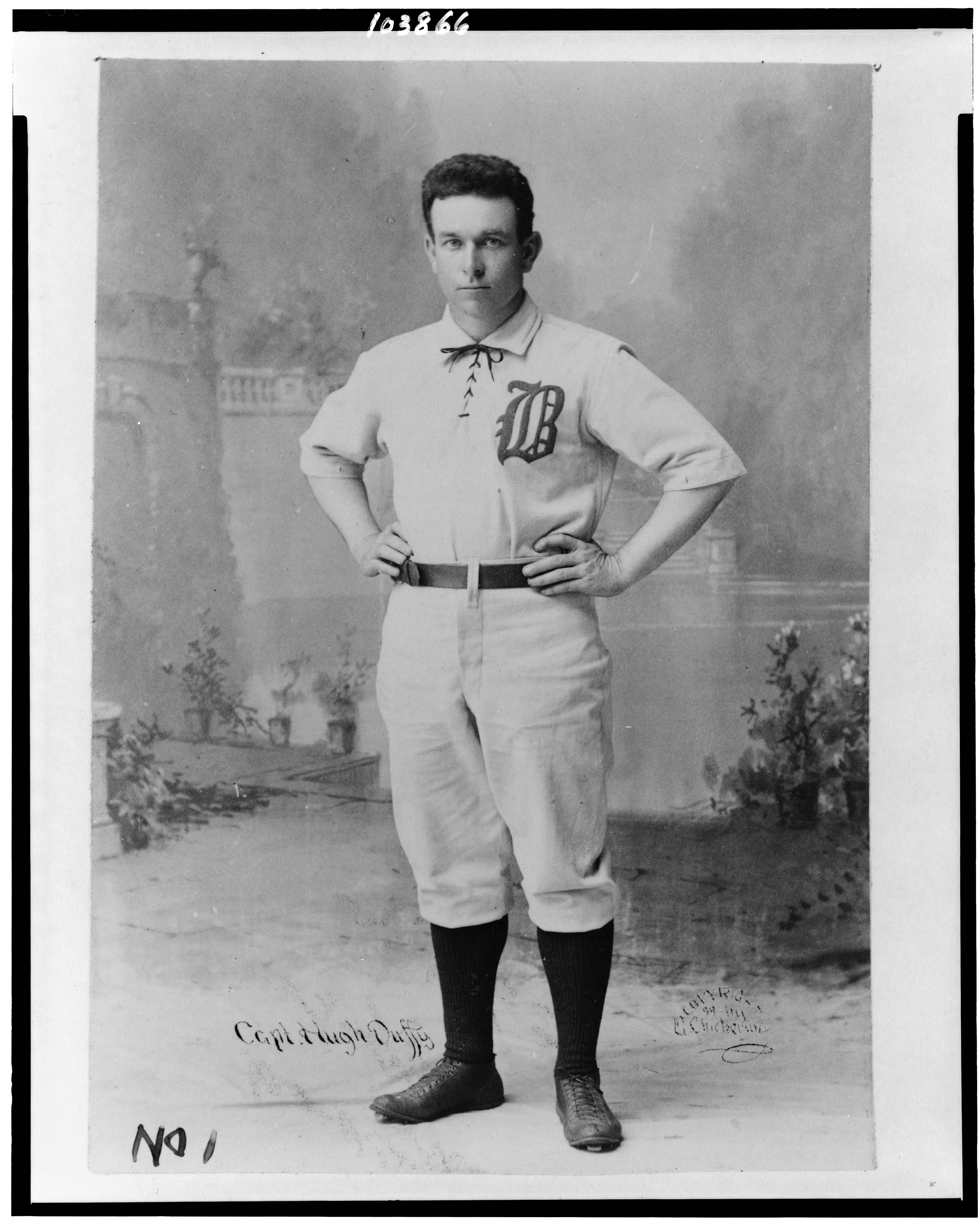
Hugh Duffy

The Detroit Wolverines defeated the St. Louis Browns in the 1887 World Series, 10 games to 5.

After the Wolverines won the National League pennant, owner Fred Stearns challenged the American Association champion St. Louis Browns. The Wolverines and the Browns would play "a series of contests for supremacy" of the baseball world. This early "world series" consisted of fifteen games – played in Pittsburgh, Brooklyn, New York, Philadelphia, Boston, Washington, Baltimore, and Chicago, as well as Detroit and St. Louis. The Wolverines claimed their eighth victory – and thus the championship – in the eleventh game.

== Series summary ==
Detroit won the series, 10–5, clinching on Game 11

Game	Date	Score	Location
1	October 10	St. Louis – 6, Detroit – 1	Sportsman's Park, St. Louis
2	October 11	St. Louis – 3, Detroit – 5	Sportsman's Park, St. Louis
3	October 12	St. Louis – 1, Detroit – 2 (13)	Recreation Park, Detroit
4	October 13	Detroit – 8, St. Louis – 0	Recreation Park, Pittsburgh
5	October 14	St. Louis – 5, Detroit – 2	Washington Park, Brooklyn
6	October 15	Detroit – 9, St. Louis – 0	Polo Grounds, New York
7	October 17	St. Louis – 1, Detroit – 3	Philadelphia Ball Park, Philadelphia
8	October 18	Detroit – 9, St. Louis – 2	Union Ball Grounds, Boston
9	October 19	St. Louis – 2, Detroit – 4	Jefferson Street Grounds, Philadelphia
10	October 21	Detroit – 4, St. Louis – 11	Swampoodle Grounds, Washington
11	October 21	St. Louis – 3, Detroit – 13	Oriole Park, Baltimore
12	October 22	Detroit – 1, St. Louis – 5 (7)	Washington Park, Brooklyn
13	October 24	Detroit – 6, St. Louis – 3	Recreation Park, Detroit
14	October 25	St. Louis – 3, Detroit – 4	West Side Park, Chicago
15	October 26	Detroit – 2, St. Louis – 9 (11)	Sportsman's Park, St. Louis

== Game summaries ==
- October 9: The St. Louis Browns ended their season with a 95–40 record‚ a win total that was not exceeded until the adoption of the 154-game schedule.
- October 10: The World Series opened in St. Louis with the Browns beating Detroit 6–1. St. Louis pitcher Bob Caruthers held the Wolverines to five hits and had three hits himself.
- October 11: In Game 2, the Wolverines scored five unearned runs to defeat the Browns, 5–3.
- October 12: In Game 3, Detroit won at home, 2–1, in 13 innings. St. Louis batters had 13 hits against Charlie Getzien‚ but scored only once. Bob Caruthers held the Wolverines to six hits, but the Wolverines scored twice.
- October 13: In Game 4, the World Series began its tour of other cities with a game in Pittsburgh. Detroit won, 8–0, behind the two-hit pitching of Lady Baldwin.
- October 14: In Game 5, the Browns beat the Wolverines in Brooklyn, 5–2.
- October 15: In Game 6, played in New York, Detroit beat St. Louis, 9–0. Charlie Getzien took a no-hitter (not counting walks) into the ninth inning but settled for a three-hit game. Charlie Ganzel‚ playing first base in place of the injured Dan Brouthers‚ led Detroit with four hits. Brouthers was out for the series with a sprained ankle.
- October 17: Detroit won Game 7, by a score of 3–1, in Phillies' Park.
- October 18: In Game 8, Detroit beat the Browns, 9–2, at old Dartmouth Street Grounds in Boston, as Big Sam Thompson hit two home runs.
- October 19: Detroit won Game 9 by a score of 4–2 at Athletics' Park and extended its lead in the World Series to seven games to two.
- October 21: After a rainout the day before, Detroit and St. Louis played two games in two cities on the same day. In the morning game in Washington, the Browns pull off a triple play in an 11–4 victory over Detroit. In Game 11, played in the afternoon at Baltimore, Detroit clinched the championship with its eighth victory, 13–3.
- October 22: The St. Louis Club managed to pull off a 5–1 victory at New York, but the game was called after seven innings due to the cold. Less than 1,000 people attended the game. Wolverines star first baseman Dan Brouthers managed to finally appear in a game, although catcher Charlie Ganzel was required to run for him.
- October 24: The teams played at Detroit, where they were "met at the depot by a large delegations of base-ball cranks," according to the Chicago Tribune. "A procession of carriages, headed by a band, was formed and the clubs escorted to the Russell House, where a public reception was held. About 4,000 people attended the game this afternoon," which was won by Detroit, 6–3.
- October 25: The Wolverines scored 4 early runs and held on to beat the Browns, 4–3, at Chicago. With the temperature below freezing, "There were between 300 and 400 persons present," the Tribune said, "and the gate receipts were about equal to the ground expenses."
- October 26: The World Series ended with a final game back in St. Louis. St. Louis won the final game but lost the series‚ 10 games to 5. Sam Thompson led all hitters in the series with a .362 average.

== Sources ==
- Baseball Library chronology for 1887
- Glory Fades Away: The Nineteenth-Century World Series Rediscovered, by Jerry Lansche, Taylor Publishing, Dallas, Texas, 1991: pp. 95–125.

== See also ==
- The original World Series
