= W. R. Bergen =

American basketball coach

Coaching career (HC unless noted)
- 1907–1909: Kendall

Head coaching record
- Overall: 4–2 (.667)

W. R. Bergen was an American basketball coach. He was the first head basketball coach at the University of Tulsa. He coached the Tulsa Golden Hurricane men's basketball team for two seasons, from 1907 to 1909.

Bergen established the Tulsa basketball squad soon after Tulsa moved from Muskogee to Tulsa. The team played its first game against Oklahoma A&M, and the two teams split their match-ups that season. After Bergen left, Tulsa did not field a basketball team for the next several seasons.

== Head coaching record ==
Record table
Season	Team	Overall	Conference	Standing	Postseason
Kendall Orange and Black (Independent) (1907–1909)
1907–08	Kendall	1–1			
1908–09	Kendall	3–1			
Kendall:		4–2 (.667)			
Total:		4–2 (.667)			
