= 1886 Cincinnati Red Stockings season =

1886 Cincinnati Red Stockings
- League: American Association
- Ballpark: American Park
- City: Cincinnati
- Record: 65–73 (.471)
- League place: 5th
- Owner: John Hauck
- Manager: O. P. Caylor

The 1886 Cincinnati Red Stockings season was a season in American baseball. The Red Stockings finished in fifth place in the American Association, 27.5 games behind the St. Louis Browns.

== Regular season ==
Pop Corkhill had a breakout season, hitting .265 with five home runs and a team high 97 RBI, while Bid McPhee hit .268 with a team highs in home runs with eight, stolen bases with 40, and runs with 139. Fred Lewis had a team high .318 batting average.

On the mound, Mullane was the ace of the staff, as he had a 33–27 record with a 3.70 ERA in 56 starts, as he struck out 250 batters in 529.2 innings pitched.

=== Season summary ===
The Red Stockings were coming off a second-place finish in the 1885 season, which was their highest placing since winning the 1882 American Association pennant. Cincinnati was relatively quiet during the off-season; however, Tony Mullane, who had been suspended for the 1885 season for defying his contract, returned and made his Cincinnati debut in 1886.

The Red Stockings started the season off slowly, winning only four of their first twelve games to sit in seventh place. Cincinnati would continue to play mediocre baseball, and would be in eighth place with a 24–35 record, 12.5 games out of first place. The Red Stockings then went on a seven-game winning streak to climb into sixth place to bring their record to 31–35, however, they remained 12.5 games out of first. The team eventually broke over the .500 level, reaching a season best three games over .500 with a 50–47 record. However, Cincinnati faded down the stretch, and finished with a losing record for the first time in team history, as they were 65–73, which was good for fifth place 27.5 games behind the St. Louis Browns.

=== Season standings ===
American Association
Team	W	L	Pct.	GB	Home	Road
St. Louis Browns	93	46	.669	—	52‍–‍18	41‍–‍28
Pittsburgh Alleghenys	80	57	.584	12	45‍–‍28	35‍–‍29
Brooklyn Grays	76	61	.555	16	44‍–‍25	32‍–‍36
Louisville Colonels	66	70	.485	25½	37‍–‍30	29‍–‍40
Cincinnati Red Stockings	65	73	.471	27½	40‍–‍31	25‍–‍42
Philadelphia Athletics	63	72	.467	28	38‍–‍31	25‍–‍41
New York Metropolitans	53	82	.393	38	30‍–‍33	23‍–‍49
Baltimore Orioles	48	83	.366	41	30‍–‍32	18‍–‍51

=== Record vs. opponents ===
1886 American Association record Sources:
Team	BAL	BRO	CIN	LOU	NYM	PHA	PIT	STL
Baltimore	—	6–14–1	5–13–2	7–12–2	8–9	8–10–1	7–12–2	7–13
Brooklyn	14–6–1	—	13–7	13–7	10–9–1	11–7–2	8–12	7–13
Cincinnati	13–5–2	7–13	—	10–10	13–7–1	10–10	7–13	5–15
Louisville	12–7–2	7–13	10–10	—	11–8	9–11	7–12	10–9
New York	9–8	9–10–1	7–13–1	8–11	—	8–12	8–12	4–16
Philadelphia	10–8–1	7–11–2	10–10	11–9	12–8	—	8–11–1	5–15
Pittsburgh	12–7–2	12–8	13–7	12–7	12–8	11–8–1	—	8–12
St. Louis	13–7	13–7	15–5	9–10	16–4	15–5	12–8	—

=== Game log ===
Legend
Red Stockings Win	Red Stockings Loss	Game Tied/Postponed

1886 Game Log: 65–73 (Home: 40–31; Away: 25–42)
April: 4–8 (Home: 3–3; Away: 1–5)

#	Date	Opponent	Score	Stadium	Attendance	Record	Streak
1	April 17	Colonels	1–5	American Park	6,000	0–1	L1
2	April 18	@ Colonels	3–4	Eclipse Park	10,000	0–2	L2
-	April 19	@ Colonels	Postponed (unknown reason); Makeup: May 2				
3	April 20	@ Colonels	9–2	Eclipse Park	N/A	1–2	W1
4	April 21	Alleghenys	7–13	American Park	N/A	1–3	L1
5	April 22	Alleghenys	9–8	American Park	N/A	2–3	W1
6	April 23	Alleghenys	13–7	American Park	N/A	3–3	W2
7	April 24	Alleghenys	14–10	American Park	N/A	4–3	W3
8	April 26	@ Browns	12–14	Sportsman's Park	N/A	4–4	L1
9	April 27	@ Browns	3–20	Sportsman's Park	N/A	4–5	L2
10	April 28	@ Browns	3–7	Sportsman's Park	N/A	4–6	L3
11	April 29	@ Browns	4–9	Sportsman's Park	N/A	4–7	L4
12	April 30	Colonels	1–7	American Park	N/A	4–8	L5

May: 11–13 (Home: 5–2; Away: 6–11)

#	Date	Opponent	Score	Stadium	Attendance	Record	Streak
13	May 1	Colonels	8–1	American Park	N/A	5–8	W1
14	May 2	@ Colonels	10–5	Eclipse Park	N/A	6–8	W2
15	May 4	Colonels	5–2	American Park	N/A	7–8	W3
16	May 5	Colonels	5–6	American Park	N/A	7–9	L1
-	May 7	@ Alleghenys	Postponed (rain); Makeup: May 12				
17	May 8	@ Alleghenys	6–9	Recreation Park	N/A	7–10	L1
18	May 10	@ Alleghenys	4–2	Recreation Park	N/A	8–10	W1
19	May 11	@ Alleghenys	7–9	Recreation Park	N/A	8–11	L1
20	May 12	@ Alleghenys	7–9	Recreation Park	N/A	8–12	L2
21	May 13	Browns	7–3	American Park	N/A	9–12	W1
22	May 14	Browns	1–2	American Park	N/A	9–13	L1
23	May 15	Browns	8–2	American Park	N/A	10–13	W1
24	May 16	Browns	7–6	American Park	N/A	11–13	W2
25	May 18	@ Orioles	4–6	Oriole Park	N/A	11–14	L1
26	May 19	@ Orioles	6–11	Oriole Park	N/A	11–15	L2
27	May 20	@ Orioles	8–7	Oriole Park	N/A	12–15	W1
28	May 21	@ Orioles	6–5	Oriole Park	N/A	13–15	W2
29	May 22	@ Athletics	7–8	Jefferson Street Grounds	N/A	13–16	L1
30	May 24	@ Athletics	4–10	Jefferson Street Grounds	N/A	13–17	L2
31	May 25	@ Athletics	10–18	Jefferson Street Grounds	N/A	13–18	L3
32	May 26	@ Athletics	6–9	Jefferson Street Grounds	N/A	13–19	L4
33	May 27	@ Grays	6–4	Washington Park	N/A	14–19	W1
-	May 28	@ Grays	Postponed (unknown reason); Makeup: May 31				
34	May 29	@ Metropolitans	6–11	St. George Cricket Grounds	N/A	14–20	L1
35	May 31 1	@ Grays	6–8	Washington Park	N/A	14–21	L2
36	May 31 2	@ Metropolitans	12–5	St. George Cricket Grounds	N/A	15–21	W1

June: 12–14 (Home: 7–4; Away: 5–10)

#	Date	Opponent	Score	Stadium	Attendance	Record	Streak
37	June 1	@ Metropolitans	12–7	St. George Cricket Grounds	N/A	16–21	W2
38	June 2	@ Grays	6–2	Washington Park	N/A	17–21	W3
39	June 3	@ Metropolitans	11–12	St. George Cricket Grounds	N/A	17–22	L1
40	June 4	@ Grays	4–7	Washington Park	N/A	17–23	L2
41	June 5	@ Alleghenys	1–3	Recreation Park	N/A	17–24	L3
42	June 7	@ Alleghenys	0–3	Recreation Park	N/A	17–25	L4
43	June 8	@ Alleghenys	10–9	Recreation Park	N/A	18–25	W1
-	June 9	Alleghenys	Postponed (rain); Makeup: June 11				
44	June 10	Alleghenys	1–5	American Park	N/A	18–26	L1
45	June 11	Alleghenys	5–3	American Park	N/A	19–26	W1
46	June 12	Alleghenys	5–6	American Park	N/A	19–27	L1
47	June 13	@ Colonels	2–4	Eclipse Park	N/A	19–28	L2
48	June 14	@ Colonels	1–4	Eclipse Park	N/A	19–29	L3
-	June 15	Colonels	Postponed (rain); Makeup: August 18				
49	June 16	Colonels	5–4	American Park	N/A	20–29	W1
50	June 17	Colonels	4–3	American Park	N/A	21–29	W2
51	June 18	@ Browns	0–11	Sportsman's Park	N/A	21–30	L1
52	June 19	@ Browns	7–12	Sportsman's Park	N/A	21–31	L2
53	June 20	@ Browns	0–8	Sportsman's Park	N/A	21–32	L3
54	June 21	Browns	5–6	American Park	N/A	21–33	L4
-	June 22	@ Colonels	Postponed (rain); Makeup: June 24				
55	June 23	@ Colonels	9–4	Eclipse Park	N/A	22–33	W1
56	June 24	@ Colonels	12–5	Eclipse Park	N/A	23–33	W2
57	June 25	Browns	2–1	American Park	N/A	24–33	W3
58	June 26	Browns	0–1	American Park	N/A	24–34	L1
59	June 27	@ Browns	1–9	Sportsman's Park	8,000	24–35	L2
60	June 28	Orioles	12–4	American Park	N/A	25–35	W1
61	June 29	Orioles	12–1	American Park	N/A	26–35	W2
62	June 30	Orioles	18–7	American Park	N/A	27–35	W3

July: 16–9 (Home: 10–3; Away: 6–6)

#	Date	Opponent	Score	Stadium	Attendance	Record	Streak
63	July 1	Orioles	7–5	American Park	N/A	28–35	W4
-	July 2	Athletics	Postponed (rain); Makeup: July 4				
64	July 3	Athletics	8–2	American Park	N/A	29–35	W5
65	July 4	Athletics	8–0	American Park	N/A	30–35	W6
66	July 5 1	Athletics	14–7	American Park	N/A	31–35	W7
67	July 5 2	Athletics	1–5	American Park	N/A	31–36	L1
68	July 7	Metropolitans	6–4	American Park	N/A	32–36	W1
69	July 8	Metropolitans	5–8	American Park	N/A	32–37	L1
70	July 9	Metropolitans	7–2	American Park	N/A	33–37	W1
71	July 10	Metropolitans	3–0	American Park	N/A	34–37	W2
72	July 11	Grays	7–11	American Park	7,000	34–38	L1
-	July 12	Grays	Postponed (unknown reason); Makeup: July 11				
73	July 13	Grays	9–4	American Park	N/A	35–38	W1
74	July 14	Grays	5–1	American Park	N/A	36–38	W2
75	July 15	Grays	7–4	American Park	N/A	37–38	W3
76	July 17	@ Athletics	10–15	Jefferson Street Grounds	N/A	37–39	L2
77	July 19	@ Athletics	14–8	Jefferson Street Grounds	N/A	38–39	W1
78	July 20	@ Athletics	9–13	Jefferson Street Grounds	N/A	38–40	L1
79	July 22	@ Orioles	11–10	Oriole Park	N/A	39–40	W1
80	July 23	@ Orioles	8–10	Oriole Park	N/A	39–41	L1
81	July 24	@ Orioles	10–4	Oriole Park	N/A	40–41	W1
82	July 26	@ Metropolitans	4–1	St. George Cricket Grounds	N/A	41–41	W2
83	July 27	@ Grays	2–10	Washington Park	N/A	41–42	L1
84	July 28	@ Metropolitans	4–1	St. George Cricket Grounds	N/A	42–42	W1
85	July 29	@ Grays	4–6	Washington Park	N/A	42–43	L1
86	July 30	@ Metropolitans	8–1	St. George Cricket Grounds	N/A	43–43	W1
87	July 31	@ Grays	0–4	Washington Park	N/A	43–44	L1

August: 9–14 (Home: 9–9; Away: 0–5)

#	Date	Opponent	Score	Stadium	Attendance	Record	Streak
88	August 3	Orioles	6–5	American Park	N/A	44–44	W1
89	August 4	Orioles	13–16	American Park	N/A	44–45	L1
90	August 5	Orioles	4–3	American Park	N/A	45–45	W1
-	August 6	Grays	Postponed (unknown reason); Makeup: August 8				
91	August 7	Grays	1–6	American Park	N/A	45–46	L1
92	August 8	Grays	2–4	American Park	N/A	45–47	L2
93	August 9	Grays	7–2	American Park	N/A	46–47	W1
-	August 10	Metropolitans	Postponed (unknown reason); Makeup: October 6				
94	August 11	Metropolitans	11–5	American Park	N/A	47–47	W2
95	August 12	Metropolitans	19–3	American Park	N/A	48–47	W3
96	August 13	Athletics	12–11	American Park	N/A	49–47	W4
97	August 14	Athletics	4–3	American Park	N/A	50–47	W5
98	August 15	Athletics	1–3	American Park	N/A	50–48	L1
-	August 16	Athletics	Postponed (unknown reason); Makeup: August 15				
99	August 18	Colonels	9–4	American Park	N/A	51–48	W1
100	August 19	@ Colonels	3–6	Eclipse Park	N/A	51–49	L1
101	August 21	@ Colonels	1–6	Eclipse Park	N/A	51–50	L2
102	August 22	@ Colonels	3–5	Eclipse Park	N/A	51–51	L3
-	August 23	Browns	Postponed (rain); Makeup: August 26				
103	August 24	Browns	0–4	American Park	N/A	51–52	L4
104	August 25	Browns	3–6	American Park	N/A	51–53	L5
105	August 26	Browns	9–3	American Park	N/A	52–53	W1
106	August 27	Alleghenys	8–11	American Park	N/A	52–54	L1
107	August 28	Alleghenys	2–10	American Park	N/A	52–55	L2
108	August 29	Alleghenys	9–11	American Park	N/A	52–56	L3
-	August 30	Alleghenys	Postponed (schedule change); Makeup: August 29				
109	August 30	@ Browns	3–10	Sportsman's Park	N/A	52–57	L4
110	August 31	@ Browns	4–10	Sportsman's Park	N/A	52–58	L5

September: 8–10 (Home: 2–4; Away: 6–6)

#	Date	Opponent	Score	Stadium	Attendance	Record	Streak
-	September 1	@ Browns	Postponed (unknown reason); Makeup: June 27				
-	September 2	@ Browns	Postponed (unknown reason); Makeup: August 30				
111	September 3	@ Alleghenys	5–3	Recreation Park	N/A	53–58	W1
112	September 4	@ Alleghenys	0–1	Recreation Park	N/A	53–59	L1
113	September 6	@ Alleghenys	4–13	Recreation Park	N/A	53–60	L2
114	September 7	Colonels	4–9	American Park	N/A	53–61	L3
115	September 8	Colonels	4–3	American Park	N/A	54–61	W1
116	September 10	@ Grays	4–8	Washington Park	N/A	54–62	L1
117	September 11	@ Metropolitans	2–8	St. George Cricket Grounds	N/A	54–63	L2
-	September 12	@ Grays	Postponed (unknown reason); Makeup: September 13				
118	September 13	@ Grays	6–0	Washington Park	N/A	55–63	W1
119	September 14	@ Metropolitans	4–3	St. George Cricket Grounds	N/A	56–63	W2
120	September 15	@ Metropolitans	3–3	St. George Cricket Grounds	N/A	56–63	W2
121	September 16	@ Grays	10–12	Washington Park	N/A	56–64	L1
122	September 17	@ Athletics	8–9	Jefferson Street Grounds	N/A	56–65	L2
123	September 18	@ Athletics	2–1	Jefferson Street Grounds	N/A	57–65	W1
124	September 20	@ Athletics	14–4	Jefferson Street Grounds	N/A	58–65	W2
125	September 21	@ Orioles	1–1	Oriole Park	N/A	58–65	W2
126	September 22	@ Orioles	11–1	Oriole Park	N/A	59–65	W3
127	September 23	@ Orioles	3–3	Oriole Park	N/A	59–65	W3
128	September 25	Grays	5–8	American Park	N/A	59–66	L1
129	September 26	Grays	4–5	American Park	N/A	59–67	L2
-	September 27	Grays	Postponed (unknown reason); Makeup: September 26				
-	September 28	Grays	Postponed (rain); Makeup: September 29				
-	September 29	Athletics	Postponed (schedule change); Makeup: October 3				
130	September 29	Grays	9–10	American Park	N/A	59–68	L3
131	September 30	Athletics	15–8	American Park	N/A	60–68	W1

October: 5–5 (Home: 5–5; Away: 0–0)

#	Date	Opponent	Score	Stadium	Attendance	Record	Streak
132	October 2	Athletics	13–1	American Park	N/A	61–68	W2
133	October 3	Athletics	6–7	American Park	N/A	61–69	L1
134	October 4	Metropolitans	4–6	American Park	N/A	61–70	L2
135	October 5	Metropolitans	4–3	American Park	N/A	62–70	W1
136	October 6 1	Metropolitans	12–6	American Park	N/A	63–70	W2
137	October 6 2	Metropolitans	3–8	American Park	N/A	63–71	L1
138	October 7	Metropolitans	4–9	American Park	N/A	63–72	L2
139	October 8	Orioles	14–8	American Park	N/A	64–72	W1
140	October 9	Orioles	4–6	American Park	N/A	64–73	L1
141	October 10	Orioles	12–4	American Park	N/A	65–73	W1
-	October 11	Orioles	Postponed (unknown reason); Makeup: October 10				

=== Roster ===
1886 Cincinnati Red Stockings
Roster
Pitchers: Dan Bickham; Bill Irwin; Larry McKeon; Tony Mullane; Joe Murphy; George Pechiney; Jeremiah Reardon; Mike Smith; Rex Smith; Clarence Stephens; Will White	Catchers: Kid Baldwin; Jack Boyle; Jim Keenan; Pop Snyder; Farmer Vaughn; Infielders: Hick Carpenter; Frank Fennelly; Bid McPhee; John Reilly	Outfielders: Pop Corkhill; Charley Jones; Fred Lewis; Lefty Marr; Leech Maskrey; Abner Powell; Lee Richmond; Lou Sylvester	Manager: O. P. Caylor

== Player stats ==
=== Batting ===
==== Starters by position ====
Note: Pos = Position; G = Games played; AB = At bats; H = Hits; Avg. = Batting average; HR = Home runs; RBI = Runs batted in

Pos	Player	G	AB	H	Avg.	HR	RBI
C	Kid Baldwin	87	315	72	.229	3	32
1B	John Reilly	115	441	117	.265	6	79
2B	Bid McPhee	140	560	150	.268	8	70
SS	Frank Fennelly	132	497	124	.249	6	72
3B	Hick Carpenter	111	458	101	.221	2	61
OF	Fred Lewis	77	324	103	.318	2	32
OF	Pop Corkhill	129	540	143	.265	5	97
OF	Charley Jones	127	500	135	.270	6	68

==== Other batters ====
Note: G = Games played; AB = At bats; H = Hits; Avg. = Batting average; HR = Home runs; RBI = Runs batted in

Player	G	AB	H	Avg.	HR	RBI
Pop Snyder	60	220	41	.186	0	28
Jim Keenan	44	148	40	.270	3	24
Leech Maskrey	27	98	19	.194	0	10
Abner Powell	19	74	17	.230	0	8
Lou Sylvester	17	55	10	.182	3	8
Lee Richmond	8	29	8	.276	0	3
Lefty Marr	8	29	8	.276	0	2
Jack Boyle	1	5	1	.200	0	0
Jeremiah Reardon	1	3	0	.000	0	0
Farmer Vaughn	1	3	0	.000	0	0

=== Pitching ===
==== Starting pitchers ====
Note: G = Games pitched; IP = Innings pitched; W = Wins; L = Losses; ERA = Earned run average; SO = Strikeouts

Player	G	IP	W	L	ERA	SO
Tony Mullane	63	529.2	33	27	3.70	250
George Pechiney	40	330.1	15	21	4.14	110
Larry McKeon	19	156.0	8	8	5.08	46
Mike Smith	9	72.2	4	4	3.72	14
Joe Murphy	5	46.0	2	3	4.89	11
Will White	3	26.0	1	2	4.15	6
Bill Irwin	2	17.0	0	2	5.82	6
Dan Bickham	1	9.0	1	0	3.00	6
Rex Smith	1	9.0	0	1	4.00	1
Clarence Stephens	1	8.0	1	0	5.62	6
Jeremiah Reardon	1	2.0	0	1	18.00	0

==== Other pitchers ====
Note: G = Games pitched; IP = Innings pitched; W = Wins; L = Losses; ERA = Earned run average; SO = Strikeouts

Player	G	IP	W	L	ERA	SO
Lee Richmond	3	18.0	0	2	8.00	6
Abner Powell	4	15.1	0	1	4.70	4

==== Relief pitchers ====
Note: G = Games pitched; W = Wins; L = Losses; SV = Saves; ERA = Earned run average; SO = Strikeouts

Player	G	W	L	SV	ERA	SO
Jim Keenan	2	0	1	0	3.38	2
Pop Corkhill	1	0	0	0	13.50	1
