= 1886 Baltimore Orioles season =

1886 Baltimore Orioles
- League: American Association
- Ballpark: Oriole Park
- City: Baltimore, Maryland
- Record: 48–83 (.366)
- League place: 8th
- Owner: Harry Von der Horst
- Manager: Billy Barnie

== Regular season ==
=== Season standings ===
American Association
Team	W	L	Pct.	GB	Home	Road
St. Louis Browns	93	46	.669	—	52‍–‍18	41‍–‍28
Pittsburgh Alleghenys	80	57	.584	12	45‍–‍28	35‍–‍29
Brooklyn Grays	76	61	.555	16	44‍–‍25	32‍–‍36
Louisville Colonels	66	70	.485	25½	37‍–‍30	29‍–‍40
Cincinnati Red Stockings	65	73	.471	27½	40‍–‍31	25‍–‍42
Philadelphia Athletics	63	72	.467	28	38‍–‍31	25‍–‍41
New York Metropolitans	53	82	.393	38	30‍–‍33	23‍–‍49
Baltimore Orioles	48	83	.366	41	30‍–‍32	18‍–‍51

=== Record vs. opponents ===
1886 American Association record Sources:
Team	BAL	BRO	CIN	LOU	NYM	PHA	PIT	STL
Baltimore	—	6–14–1	5–13–2	7–12–2	8–9	8–10–1	7–12–2	7–13
Brooklyn	14–6–1	—	13–7	13–7	10–9–1	11–7–2	8–12	7–13
Cincinnati	13–5–2	7–13	—	10–10	13–7–1	10–10	7–13	5–15
Louisville	12–7–2	7–13	10–10	—	11–8	9–11	7–12	10–9
New York	9–8	9–10–1	7–13–1	8–11	—	8–12	8–12	4–16
Philadelphia	10–8–1	7–11–2	10–10	11–9	12–8	—	8–11–1	5–15
Pittsburgh	12–7–2	12–8	13–7	12–7	12–8	11–8–1	—	8–12
St. Louis	13–7	13–7	15–5	9–10	16–4	15–5	12–8	—

=== Notable transactions ===
- April 1886: Milt Scott was assigned to the Orioles by the Pittsburgh Alleghenys.

=== Roster ===
1886 Baltimore Orioles
Roster
Pitchers: Dick Conway; Hardie Henderson; William Houseman; Matt Kilroy; Ed Knouff; Jumbo McGinnis; Abner Powell; Billy Taylor	Catchers: Ned Bligh; Bill Conway; Tom Dolan; Chris Fulmer; Tony Hellman; Bill Traffley; Infielders: Jumbo Davis; Joe Farrell; Sadie Houck; Jimmy Macullar; Mike Muldoon; Sandy Nava; Milt Scott	Outfielders: Billy Barnie; Jim Clinton; Ed Greer; Buster Hoover; Jack Manning; Pat O'Connell; Blondie Purcell; Joe Sommer; Len Sowders; William Zay	Manager: Billy Barnie

== Player stats ==
=== Batting ===
==== Starters by position ====
Note: Pos = Position; G = Games played; AB = At bats; H = Hits; Avg. = Batting average; HR = Home runs; RBI = Runs batted in

Pos	Player	G	AB	H	Avg.	HR	RBI
C	Chris Fulmer	80	270	66	.244	1	30
1B	Milt Scott	137	484	92	.190	2	52
2B	Mike Muldoon	101	381	76	.199	0	23
SS	Jimmy Macullar	85	268	55	.205	0	26
3B	Jumbo Davis	60	216	42	.194	1	20
OF	Jack Manning	137	556	124	.223	1	45
OF	Buster Hoover	40	157	34	.217	0	10
OF	Joe Sommer	139	560	117	.209	1	52

==== Other batters ====
Note: G = Games played; AB = At bats; H = Hits; Avg. = Batting average; HR = Home runs; RBI = Runs batted in

Player	G	AB	H	Avg.	HR	RBI
Joe Farrell	73	301	63	.209	1	31
Sadie Houck	61	260	50	.192	0	17
Pat O'Connell	42	166	30	.181	0	8
Tom Dolan	38	125	19	.152	0	12
Blondie Purcell	26	85	19	.224	0	8
Bill Traffley	25	85	18	.212	0	7
Jim Clinton	23	83	15	.181	0	6
Len Sowders	23	76	20	.263	0	14
Billy Taylor	10	39	12	.308	0	8
Ed Greer	11	38	5	.132	0	4
Bill Conway	7	14	2	.143	0	3
Ned Bligh	3	9	0	.000	0	0
Billy Barnie	2	6	0	.000	0	0
Sandy Nava	2	5	1	.200	0	0
Tony Hellman	1	3	0	.000	0	0
William Zay	1	1	0	.000	0	0

=== Pitching ===
==== Starting pitchers ====
Note: G = Games pitched; IP = Innings pitched; W = Wins; L = Losses; ERA = Earned run average; SO = Strikeouts

Player	G	IP	W	L	ERA	SO
Matt Kilroy	68	583.0	29	34	3.37	513
Jumbo McGinnis	26	209.1	11	13	3.48	70
Hardie Henderson	19	171.1	3	15	4.62	88
Dick Conway	9	76.2	2	7	6.81	64
Billy Taylor	8	72.1	1	6	5.72	37
Abner Powell	7	60.0	2	5	5.10	15
Ed Knouff	1	9.0	0	1	2.00	8
William Houseman	1	8.0	0	1	3.38	5
William Zay	1	2.0	0	0	9.00	2

==== Relief pitchers ====
Note: G = Games pitched; W = Wins; L = Losses; SV = Saves; ERA = Earned run average; SO = Strikeouts

Player	G	W	L	SV	ERA	SO
Joe Sommer	1	0	0	0	18.00	1
Pat O'Connell	1	0	0	0	6.00	1
Milt Scott	1	0	0	0	3.00	0
Chris Fulmer	1	0	0	0	4.50	0
Jimmy Macullar	1	0	0	0	9.00	1
Blondie Purcell	1	0	0	0	9.00	0
