= 1886 Philadelphia Athletics season =

1886 Philadelphia Athletics
- League: American Association
- Ballpark: Jefferson Street Grounds
- City: Philadelphia
- Record: 63–72 (.467)
- League place: 6th
- Owners: Bill Sharsig, Lew Simmons, Charlie Mason
- Managers: Lew Simmons, Bill Sharsig

The 1886 Philadelphia Athletics finished with a 63–72 record and finished in sixth place in the American Association.

== Regular season ==
=== Season standings ===
American Association
Team	W	L	Pct.	GB	Home	Road
St. Louis Browns	93	46	.669	—	52‍–‍18	41‍–‍28
Pittsburgh Alleghenys	80	57	.584	12	45‍–‍28	35‍–‍29
Brooklyn Grays	76	61	.555	16	44‍–‍25	32‍–‍36
Louisville Colonels	66	70	.485	25½	37‍–‍30	29‍–‍40
Cincinnati Red Stockings	65	73	.471	27½	40‍–‍31	25‍–‍42
Philadelphia Athletics	63	72	.467	28	38‍–‍31	25‍–‍41
New York Metropolitans	53	82	.393	38	30‍–‍33	23‍–‍49
Baltimore Orioles	48	83	.366	41	30‍–‍32	18‍–‍51

=== Record vs. opponents ===
1886 American Association record Sources:
Team	BAL	BRO	CIN	LOU	NYM	PHA	PIT	STL
Baltimore	—	6–14–1	5–13–2	7–12–2	8–9	8–10–1	7–12–2	7–13
Brooklyn	14–6–1	—	13–7	13–7	10–9–1	11–7–2	8–12	7–13
Cincinnati	13–5–2	7–13	—	10–10	13–7–1	10–10	7–13	5–15
Louisville	12–7–2	7–13	10–10	—	11–8	9–11	7–12	10–9
New York	9–8	9–10–1	7–13–1	8–11	—	8–12	8–12	4–16
Philadelphia	10–8–1	7–11–2	10–10	11–9	12–8	—	8–11–1	5–15
Pittsburgh	12–7–2	12–8	13–7	12–7	12–8	11–8–1	—	8–12
St. Louis	13–7	13–7	15–5	9–10	16–4	15–5	12–8	—

=== Roster ===
1886 Philadelphia Athletics
Roster
Pitchers: Al Atkinson; Jake Aydelott; Jim Brown; Ed Clark; Charlie Gessner; Bill Hart; Ted Kennedy; Bobby Mathews; Cyclone Miller; Rex Smith; Sam Weaver	Catchers: Jocko Milligan; Jack O'Brien; Wilbert Robinson; Infielders: Lou Bierbauer; George Bradley; Jack Gleason; John Irwin; Charlie Kelly; Denny Lyons; Chippy McGarr; Joe Quest	Outfielders: John Coleman; Ed Greer; William Hyndman; Henry Larkin; Orator Shafer; Harry Stovey	Manager: Bill Sharsig; Lew Simmons

== Player stats ==
=== Batting ===
==== Starters by position ====
Note: Pos = Position; G = Games played; AB = At bats; H = Hits; Avg. = Batting average; HR = Home runs; RBI = Runs batted in

Pos	Player	G	AB	H	Avg.	HR	RBI
C	Wilbert Robinson	87	342	69	.202	1	30
1B	Jocko Milligan	75	301	76	.252	5	45
2B	Lou Bierbauer	137	522	118	.226	2	47
SS	Chippy McGarr	71	267	71	.266	2	31
3B	Jack Gleason	77	299	56	.187	1	31
OF	Harry Stovey	123	489	144	.294	7	59
OF	John Coleman	121	492	121	.246	0	65
OF	Henry Larkin	139	565	180	.319	2	74

==== Other batters ====
Note: G = Games played; AB = At bats; H = Hits; Avg. = Batting average; HR = Home runs; RBI = Runs batted in

Player	G	AB	H	Avg.	HR	RBI
Jack O'Brien	105	423	107	.253	0	56
Ed Greer	71	264	51	.193	1	20
Joe Quest	42	150	31	.207	0	10
Denny Lyons	32	123	26	.211	0	11
Orator Shafer	21	82	22	.268	0	8
George Bradley	13	48	4	.083	0	1
John Irwin	3	13	3	.231	0	1
William Hyndman	1	4	0	.000	0	0
Charlie Kelly	1	3	0	.000	0	0

=== Pitching ===
==== Starting pitchers ====
Note: G = Games pitched; IP = Innings pitched; W = Wins; L = Losses; ERA = Earned run average; SO = Strikeouts

Player	G	IP	W	L	ERA	SO
Al Atkinson	45	396.2	25	17	3.95	154
Bobby Mathews	24	197.2	13	9	3.96	93
Bill Hart	22	186.0	9	13	3.19	78
Ted Kennedy	20	172.2	5	15	4.53	68
Cyclone Miller	19	169.2	10	8	2.97	99
Jake Aydelott	2	18.0	0	2	4.00	5
Sam Weaver	2	11.0	0	2	14.73	2
Rex Smith	1	9.0	0	1	7.00	4
Jim Brown	1	8.1	0	1	3.24	4
Ed Clark	1	8.0	0	1	6.75	2
Charlie Gessner	1	8.0	0	1	9.00	0
William Hyndman	1	2.0	0	1	27.00	1

==== Other pitchers ====
Note: G = Games pitched; IP = Innings pitched; W = Wins; L = Losses; ERA = Earned run average; SO = Strikeouts

Player	G	IP	W	L	ERA	SO
John Coleman	3	20.2	1	1	2.61	2

==== Relief pitchers ====
Note: G = Games pitched; W = Wins; L = Losses; SV = Saves; ERA = Earned run average; SO = Strikeouts

Player	G	W	L	SV	ERA	SO
Lou Bierbauer	2	0	0	0	4.22	1
Harry Stovey	1	0	0	0	27.00	0
