= 1886 Louisville Colonels season =

1886 Louisville Colonels
- League: American Association
- Ballpark: Eclipse Park
- City: Louisville, Kentucky
- Record: 66–70 (.485)
- League place: 4th
- Owners: W. L. Lyons, Zach Phelps, W. L. Jackson, John Phelps
- Manager: Jim Hart

The 1886 Louisville Colonels season was a season in American baseball. The team finished with a 66–70 record, fourth place in the American Association.

== Regular season ==
=== Season standings ===
American Association
Team	W	L	Pct.	GB	Home	Road
St. Louis Browns	93	46	.669	—	52‍–‍18	41‍–‍28
Pittsburgh Alleghenys	80	57	.584	12	45‍–‍28	35‍–‍29
Brooklyn Grays	76	61	.555	16	44‍–‍25	32‍–‍36
Louisville Colonels	66	70	.485	25½	37‍–‍30	29‍–‍40
Cincinnati Red Stockings	65	73	.471	27½	40‍–‍31	25‍–‍42
Philadelphia Athletics	63	72	.467	28	38‍–‍31	25‍–‍41
New York Metropolitans	53	82	.393	38	30‍–‍33	23‍–‍49
Baltimore Orioles	48	83	.366	41	30‍–‍32	18‍–‍51

=== Record vs. opponents ===
1886 American Association record Sources:
Team	BAL	BRO	CIN	LOU	NYM	PHA	PIT	STL
Baltimore	—	6–14–1	5–13–2	7–12–2	8–9	8–10–1	7–12–2	7–13
Brooklyn	14–6–1	—	13–7	13–7	10–9–1	11–7–2	8–12	7–13
Cincinnati	13–5–2	7–13	—	10–10	13–7–1	10–10	7–13	5–15
Louisville	12–7–2	7–13	10–10	—	11–8	9–11	7–12	10–9
New York	9–8	9–10–1	7–13–1	8–11	—	8–12	8–12	4–16
Philadelphia	10–8–1	7–11–2	10–10	11–9	12–8	—	8–11–1	5–15
Pittsburgh	12–7–2	12–8	13–7	12–7	12–8	11–8–1	—	8–12
St. Louis	13–7	13–7	15–5	9–10	16–4	15–5	12–8	—

=== Roster ===
1886 Louisville Colonels
Roster
Pitchers: Ice Box Chamberlain; Bones Ely; Guy Hecker; Ted Kennedy; Toad Ramsey; Tom Sullivan	Catchers: Amos Cross; John Kerins; Infielders: Paul Cook; Jack Heinzman; Reddy Mack; Joe Werrick; Bill White	Outfielders: Pete Browning; Hub Collins; Leech Maskrey; Clarence Murphy; Joe Neale; Phil Reccius; Joe Strauss; Lou Sylvester; Tom Terrell; Jimmy Wolf	Manager: Jim Hart

== Player stats ==
=== Batting ===
==== Starters by position ====
Note: Pos = Position; G = Games played; AB = At bats; H = Hits; Avg. = Batting average; HR = Home runs; RBI = Runs batted in

Pos	Player	G	AB	H	Avg.	HR	RBI
C	John Kerins	120	487	131	.269	4	50
1B	Paul Cook	66	262	54	.206	0	14
2B	Reddy Mack	137	483	118	.244	1	56
3B	Joe Werrick	136	561	140	.250	3	62
SS	Bill White	135	557	143	.257	1	66
OF	Jimmy Wolf	130	545	148	.272	3	61
OF	Joe Strauss	74	297	64	.215	1	31
OF	Pete Browning	112	467	159	.340	2	68

==== Other batters ====
Note: G = Games played; AB = At bats; H = Hits; Avg. = Batting average; HR = Home runs; RBI = Runs batted in

Player	G	AB	H	Avg.	HR	RBI
Amos Cross	74	283	78	.276	1	42
Lou Sylvester	45	154	35	.227	0	17
Hub Collins	27	101	29	.287	0	10
Bones Ely	10	32	5	.156	0	6
Leech Maskrey	5	19	3	.158	0	2
Phil Reccius	5	13	4	.308	0	2
Joe Neale	2	5	0	.000	0	0
Jack Heinzman	1	5	0	.000	0	0
Tom Terrell	1	4	1	.250	0	0

=== Pitching ===
==== Starting pitchers ====
Note: G = Games pitched; IP = Innings pitched; W = Wins; L = Losses; ERA = Earned run average; SO = Strikeouts

Player	G	IP	W	L	ERA	SO
Toad Ramsey	67	588.2	38	27	2.45	499
Guy Hecker	49	420.2	26	23	2.87	133
Tom Sullivan	9	75.0	2	7	3.96	27
Ted Kennedy	4	32.0	0	4	5.34	14
Ice Box Chamberlain	4	31.1	0	3	6.61	18
Joe Neale	1	7.0	0	1	7.71	0
Phil Reccius	1	3.0	0	1	9.00	0

==== Other pitchers ====
Note: G = Games pitched; IP = Innings pitched; W = Wins; L = Losses; ERA = Earned run average; SO = Strikeouts

Player	G	IP	W	L	ERA	SO
Bones Ely	6	44.0	0	4	5.32	28

==== Relief pitchers ====
Note: G = Games pitched; W = Wins; L = Losses; SV = Saves; ERA = Earned run average; SO = Strikeouts

Player	G	W	L	SV	ERA	SO
Joe Strauss	2	0	0	1	4.50	0
Jimmy Wolf	1	0	0	0	15.00	0
Bill White	1	0	0	0	9.00	1
