= 1886 New York Metropolitans season =

1886 New York Metropolitans
- League: American Association
- Ballpark: St. George Cricket Grounds
- City: New York, New York
- Record: 53–82 (.393)
- League place: 7th
- Owner: Erastus Wiman
- Managers: Jim Gifford, Bob Ferguson

The 1886 New York Metropolitans (under new management) finished with a 53–82 record, seventh place in the American Association.

== Regular season ==
=== Season standings ===
American Association
Team	W	L	Pct.	GB	Home	Road
St. Louis Browns	93	46	.669	—	52‍–‍18	41‍–‍28
Pittsburgh Alleghenys	80	57	.584	12	45‍–‍28	35‍–‍29
Brooklyn Grays	76	61	.555	16	44‍–‍25	32‍–‍36
Louisville Colonels	66	70	.485	25½	37‍–‍30	29‍–‍40
Cincinnati Red Stockings	65	73	.471	27½	40‍–‍31	25‍–‍42
Philadelphia Athletics	63	72	.467	28	38‍–‍31	25‍–‍41
New York Metropolitans	53	82	.393	38	30‍–‍33	23‍–‍49
Baltimore Orioles	48	83	.366	41	30‍–‍32	18‍–‍51

=== Record vs. opponents ===
1886 American Association record Sources:
Team	BAL	BRO	CIN	LOU	NYM	PHA	PIT	STL
Baltimore	—	6–14–1	5–13–2	7–12–2	8–9	8–10–1	7–12–2	7–13
Brooklyn	14–6–1	—	13–7	13–7	10–9–1	11–7–2	8–12	7–13
Cincinnati	13–5–2	7–13	—	10–10	13–7–1	10–10	7–13	5–15
Louisville	12–7–2	7–13	10–10	—	11–8	9–11	7–12	10–9
New York	9–8	9–10–1	7–13–1	8–11	—	8–12	8–12	4–16
Philadelphia	10–8–1	7–11–2	10–10	11–9	12–8	—	8–11–1	5–15
Pittsburgh	12–7–2	12–8	13–7	12–7	12–8	11–8–1	—	8–12
St. Louis	13–7	13–7	15–5	9–10	16–4	15–5	12–8	—

=== Roster ===
1886 New York Metropolitans
Roster
Pitchers: Ed Cushman; Jack Lynch; Al Mays; John Shaffer; Catchers: Joe Crotty; Bill Holbert; Charlie Reipschlager; Chief Zimmer	Infielders: Peter Connell; Tom Forster; Elmer Foster; Frank Hankinson; Tom McLaughlin; John Meister; Candy Nelson; Dave Orr	Outfielders: Steve Behel; Steve Brady; Jim Donahue; Fred Mauer; Chief Roseman	Manager: Bob Ferguson; Jim Gifford

== Player stats ==
=== Batting ===
==== Starters by position ====
Note: Pos = Position; G = Games played; AB = At bats; H = Hits; Avg. = Batting average; HR = Home runs; RBI = Runs batted in

Pos	Player	G	AB	H	Avg.	HR	RBI
C	Charlie Reipschlager	65	232	49	.211	0	25
1B	Dave Orr	136	571	193	.338	7	91
2B	Tom Forster	67	251	49	.195	1	20
SS	Candy Nelson	109	413	93	.225	0	23
3B	Frank Hankinson	136	522	126	.241	2	63
OF	Chief Roseman	134	559	127	.227	5	53
OF	Steve Behel	59	224	46	.205	0	17
OF	Steve Brady	124	466	112	.240	0	39

==== Other batters ====
Note: G = Games played; AB = At bats; H = Hits; Avg. = Batting average; HR = Home runs; RBI = Runs batted in

Player	G	AB	H	Avg.	HR	RBI
Tom McLaughlin	74	250	34	.136	0	16
Jim Donahue	49	186	37	.199	0	9
John Meister	45	186	44	.237	2	21
Bill Holbert	48	171	35	.205	0	13
Elmer Foster	35	125	23	.184	0	7
Joe Crotty	14	47	8	.170	0	2
Chief Zimmer	6	19	3	.158	0	1
Peter Connell	1	5	0	.000	0	0
Fred Mauer	1	1	0	.000	0	0

=== Pitching ===
==== Starting pitchers ====
Note: G = Games pitched; IP = Innings pitched; W = Wins; L = Losses; ERA = Earned run average; SO = Strikeouts

Player	G	IP	W	L	ERA	SO
Jack Lynch	51	432.2	20	30	3.95	193
Al Mays	41	350.0	11	27	3.89	163
Ed Cushman	38	325.2	17	21	3.12	167
John Shaffer	8	69.0	5	3	1.96	36
Fred Mauer	1	2.0	0	1	36.00	0

==== Relief pitchers ====
Note: G = Games pitched; W = Wins; L = Losses; SV = Saves; ERA = Earned run average; SO = Strikeouts

Player	G	W	L	SV	ERA	SO
Chief Roseman	1	0	0	0	5.14	0
