= 1886 Brooklyn Grays season =

1886 Brooklyn Grays
- League: American Association
- Ballpark: Washington Park
- City: Brooklyn, New York
- Record: 76–61 (.555)
- League place: 3rd
- Owners: Charles Byrne, Ferdinand Abell
- President: Charles Byrne
- Manager: Charlie Byrne

The 1886 Brooklyn Grays season was a season in American baseball. The team finished the season in third place with a record of 76–61 (their first winning season), 16 games behind the St. Louis Browns.

== Regular season ==
=== Season standings ===
American Association
Team	W	L	Pct.	GB	Home	Road
St. Louis Browns	93	46	.669	—	52‍–‍18	41‍–‍28
Pittsburgh Alleghenys	80	57	.584	12	45‍–‍28	35‍–‍29
Brooklyn Grays	76	61	.555	16	44‍–‍25	32‍–‍36
Louisville Colonels	66	70	.485	25½	37‍–‍30	29‍–‍40
Cincinnati Red Stockings	65	73	.471	27½	40‍–‍31	25‍–‍42
Philadelphia Athletics	63	72	.467	28	38‍–‍31	25‍–‍41
New York Metropolitans	53	82	.393	38	30‍–‍33	23‍–‍49
Baltimore Orioles	48	83	.366	41	30‍–‍32	18‍–‍51

=== Record vs. opponents ===
1886 American Association record Sources:
Team	BAL	BRO	CIN	LOU	NYM	PHA	PIT	STL
Baltimore	—	6–14–1	5–13–2	7–12–2	8–9	8–10–1	7–12–2	7–13
Brooklyn	14–6–1	—	13–7	13–7	10–9–1	11–7–2	8–12	7–13
Cincinnati	13–5–2	7–13	—	10–10	13–7–1	10–10	7–13	5–15
Louisville	12–7–2	7–13	10–10	—	11–8	9–11	7–12	10–9
New York	9–8	9–10–1	7–13–1	8–11	—	8–12	8–12	4–16
Philadelphia	10–8–1	7–11–2	10–10	11–9	12–8	—	8–11–1	5–15
Pittsburgh	12–7–2	12–8	13–7	12–7	12–8	11–8–1	—	8–12
St. Louis	13–7	13–7	15–5	9–10	16–4	15–5	12–8	—

=== Notable transactions ===
- September 1, 1886: Joe Strauss was purchased by the Grays from the Louisville Colonels.

=== Roster ===
1886 Brooklyn Grays
Roster
Pitchers: John Harkins; Hardie Henderson; Henry Porter; Adonis Terry; Steve Toole	Catchers: Bob Clark; Jim McCauley; Dave Oldfield; Jimmy Peoples; Infielders: Bill McClellan; Bill Phillips; George Pinkney; Germany Smith	Outfielders: Ernie Burch; Ed Kennedy; Jim McTamany; Pop Schriver; Joe Strauss; Ed Swartwood	Manager: Charlie Byrne

== Player stats ==
=== Batting ===
==== Starters by position ====
Note: Pos = Position; G = Games played; AB = At bats; R = Runs scored; H = Hits; Avg. = Batting average; HR = Home runs; RBI = Runs batted In; SB = Stolen bases

Pos	Player	G	AB	R	H	Avg.	HR	RBI	SB
C	Jimmy Peoples	93	340	43	74	.218	3	38	20
1B	Bill Phillips	141	585	68	160	.274	0	72	13
2B	Bill McClellan	141	595	131	152	.255	1	68	43
3B	George Pinkney	141	597	119	156	.261	0	37	32
SS	Germany Smith	105	426	66	105	.246	2	45	22
OF	Ed Swartwood	122	471	95	132	.280	3	58	37
OF	Ernie Burch	113	456	78	119	.261	2	72	16
OF	Jim McTamany	111	418	86	106	.254	2	56	18

==== Other batters ====
Note: G = Games played; AB = At bats; R = Runs scored; H = Hits; Avg. = Batting average; HR = Home runs; RBI = Runs batted In; SB = Stolen bases

Player	G	AB	R	H	Avg.	HR	RBI	SB
Adonis Terry	75	299	34	71	.237	2	39	17
Bob Clark	71	269	37	58	.216	0	26	14
Dave Oldfield	14	55	7	13	.236	0	5	1
Joe Strauss	9	36	6	9	.250	0	5	4
Jim McCauley	11	30	5	7	.233	0	3	2
Ed Kennedy	6	22	1	4	.182	0	2	1
Pop Schriver	8	21	2	1	.048	0	0	0

=== Pitching ===
==== Starting pitchers ====
Note: G = Games pitched; GS = Games started; IP = Innings pitched; W = Wins; L = Losses; ERA = Earned run average; BB = Walks; SO = Strikeouts; CG = Complete games

Player	G	GS	IP	W	L	ERA	BB	SO	CG
Henry Porter	48	48	424.0	27	19	3.42	120	163	48
John Harkins	34	33	292.1	15	16	3.60	114	118	33
Adonis Terry	34	34	288.1	18	16	3.09	115	162	32
Hardie Henderson	14	14	124.0	10	4	2.90	51	49	14
Steve Toole	13	12	104.0	6	6	4.41	64	48	11

==== Relief pitchers ====
Note: G = Games pitched; W = Wins; L = Losses; SV = Saves; ERA = Earned run average; SO = Strikeouts

Player	G	W	L	SV	ERA	SO
George Pinkney	1	0	0	0	4.50	0
