= 1886 Pittsburgh Alleghenys season =

1886 Pittsburgh Alleghenys
- League: American Association
- Ballpark: Recreation Park
- City: Allegheny, Pennsylvania
- Record: 80–57 (.584)
- League place: 2nd
- Owner: Denny McKnight
- Manager: Horace B. Phillips

The 1886 Pittsburgh Alleghenys season was the fifth season of the Pittsburgh Alleghenys franchise. The Alleghenys finished second in the American Association with a record of 80–57.

== Regular season ==
=== Season standings ===
American Association
Team	W	L	Pct.	GB	Home	Road
St. Louis Browns	93	46	.669	—	52‍–‍18	41‍–‍28
Pittsburgh Alleghenys	80	57	.584	12	45‍–‍28	35‍–‍29
Brooklyn Grays	76	61	.555	16	44‍–‍25	32‍–‍36
Louisville Colonels	66	70	.485	25½	37‍–‍30	29‍–‍40
Cincinnati Red Stockings	65	73	.471	27½	40‍–‍31	25‍–‍42
Philadelphia Athletics	63	72	.467	28	38‍–‍31	25‍–‍41
New York Metropolitans	53	82	.393	38	30‍–‍33	23‍–‍49
Baltimore Orioles	48	83	.366	41	30‍–‍32	18‍–‍51

=== Record vs. opponents ===
1886 American Association record Sources:
Team	BAL	BRO	CIN	LOU	NYM	PHA	PIT	STL
Baltimore	—	6–14–1	5–13–2	7–12–2	8–9	8–10–1	7–12–2	7–13
Brooklyn	14–6–1	—	13–7	13–7	10–9–1	11–7–2	8–12	7–13
Cincinnati	13–5–2	7–13	—	10–10	13–7–1	10–10	7–13	5–15
Louisville	12–7–2	7–13	10–10	—	11–8	9–11	7–12	10–9
New York	9–8	9–10–1	7–13–1	8–11	—	8–12	8–12	4–16
Philadelphia	10–8–1	7–11–2	10–10	11–9	12–8	—	8–11–1	5–15
Pittsburgh	12–7–2	12–8	13–7	12–7	12–8	11–8–1	—	8–12
St. Louis	13–7	13–7	15–5	9–10	16–4	15–5	12–8	—

=== Game log ===
1886 Game Log
April: 4–7 (Home: 0–0; Away: 4–7)

#	Date	Opponent	Score	Record
1	Sunday, Apr 18	@ St. Louis Browns	4–8	0–1
2	Sunday, Apr 18	@ St. Louis Browns	5–10	0–2
3	Monday, Apr 19	@ St. Louis Browns	6–5	1–2
4	Tuesday, Apr 20	@ St. Louis Browns	10–11	1–3
5	Wednesday, Apr 21	@ Cincinnati Red Stockings	13–7	2–3
6	Thursday, Apr 22	@ Cincinnati Red Stockings	8–9	2–4
7	Friday, Apr 23	@ Cincinnati Red Stockings	7–13	2–5
8	Saturday, Apr 24	@ Cincinnati Red Stockings	10–14	2–6
9	Monday, Apr 26	@ Louisville Colonels	8–3	3–6
10	Tuesday, Apr 27	@ Louisville Colonels	8–3	4–6
11	Wednesday, Apr 28	@ Louisville Colonels	1–2	4–7

May: 15–8 (Home: 9–5; Away: 6–3)

#	Date	Opponent	Score	Record
12	Saturday, May 1	St. Louis Browns	4–5	4–8
13	Monday, May 3	St. Louis Browns	7–6	5–8
14	Tuesday, May 4	St. Louis Browns	7–14	5–9
15	Thursday, May 6	St. Louis Browns	6–0	6–9
16	Saturday, May 8	Cincinnati Red Stockings	9–6	7–9
17	Monday, May 10	Cincinnati Red Stockings	2–4	7–10
18	Tuesday, May 11	Cincinnati Red Stockings	9–7	8–10
19	Wednesday, May 12	Cincinnati Red Stockings	9–7	9–10
20	Thursday, May 13	Louisville Colonels	4–2	10–10
21	Friday, May 14	Louisville Colonels	1–4	10–11
22	Saturday, May 15	Louisville Colonels	2–6	10–12
23	Monday, May 17	Louisville Colonels	5–3	11–12
24	Tuesday, May 18	@ New York Metropolitans	4–14	11–13
25	Wednesday, May 19	@ New York Metropolitans	6–4	12–13
26	Thursday, May 20	@ Brooklyn Grays	1–0	13–13
27	Friday, May 21	@ Brooklyn Grays	6–4	14–13
28	Saturday, May 22	@ New York Metropolitans	5–4	15–13
29	Tuesday, May 25	@ Brooklyn Grays	6–4	16–13
30	Wednesday, May 26	@ Brooklyn Grays	3–7	16–14
31	Thursday, May 27	@ Baltimore Orioles	6–5	17–14
32	Friday, May 28	@ Baltimore Orioles	1–4	17–15
33	Saturday, May 29	Baltimore Orioles	15–5	18–15
34	Saturday, May 29	Baltimore Orioles	4–0	19–15

June: 12–10 (Home: 7–4; Away: 5–6)

#	Date	Opponent	Score	Record
35	Tuesday, Jun 1	@ Philadelphia Athletics	6–16	19–16
36	Wednesday, Jun 2	@ Philadelphia Athletics	6–1	20–16
37	Thursday, Jun 3	@ Philadelphia Athletics	5–12	20–17
38	Friday, Jun 4	@ Philadelphia Athletics	16–8	21–17
39	Saturday, Jun 5	Cincinnati Red Stockings	3–1	22–17
40	Monday, Jun 7	Cincinnati Red Stockings	3–0	23–17
41	Tuesday, Jun 8	Cincinnati Red Stockings	9–10	23–18
42	Thursday, Jun 10	@ Cincinnati Red Stockings	5–1	24–18
43	Friday, Jun 11	@ Cincinnati Red Stockings	3–5	24–19
44	Saturday, Jun 12	@ Cincinnati Red Stockings	6–5	25–19
45	Sunday, Jun 13	@ St. Louis Browns	0–2	25–20
46	Wednesday, Jun 16	@ St. Louis Browns	0–1	25–21
47	Friday, Jun 18	Louisville Colonels	4–9	25–22
48	Saturday, Jun 19	Louisville Colonels	2–3	25–23
49	Monday, Jun 21	Louisville Colonels	8–2	26–23
50	Wednesday, Jun 23	St. Louis Browns	3–0	27–23
51	Thursday, Jun 24	St. Louis Browns	1–2	27–24
52	Friday, Jun 25	@ Louisville Colonels	5–19	27–25
53	Saturday, Jun 26	@ Louisville Colonels	4–3	28–25
54	Monday, Jun 28	Philadelphia Athletics	9–1	29–25
55	Tuesday, Jun 29	Philadelphia Athletics	7–2	30–25
56	Wednesday, Jun 30	Philadelphia Athletics	12–3	31–25

July: 12–13 (Home: 8–5; Away: 4–8)

#	Date	Opponent	Score	Record
57	Thursday, Jul 1	Philadelphia Athletics	4–5	31–26
58	Friday, Jul 2	Baltimore Orioles	6–0	32–26
59	Saturday, Jul 3	Baltimore Orioles	3–12	32–27
60	Monday, Jul 5	Baltimore Orioles	15–1	33–27
61	Monday, Jul 5	Baltimore Orioles	13–2	34–27
62	Wednesday, Jul 7	Brooklyn Grays	6–2	35–27
63	Thursday, Jul 8	Brooklyn Grays	8–1	36–27
64	Friday, Jul 9	Brooklyn Grays	0–4	36–28
65	Saturday, Jul 10	Brooklyn Grays	4–5	36–29
66	Monday, Jul 12	New York Metropolitans	2–4	36–30
67	Tuesday, Jul 13	New York Metropolitans	9–3	37–30
68	Wednesday, Jul 14	New York Metropolitans	4–1	38–30
69	Thursday, Jul 15	New York Metropolitans	5–3	39–30
70	Saturday, Jul 17	@ Baltimore Orioles	7–6	40–30
71	Monday, Jul 19	@ Baltimore Orioles	5–4	41–30
72	Tuesday, Jul 20	@ Baltimore Orioles	2–5	41–31
73	Wednesday, Jul 21	@ Baltimore Orioles	1–6	41–32
74	Thursday, Jul 22	@ Philadelphia Athletics	4–7	41–33
75	Friday, Jul 23	@ Philadelphia Athletics	17–6	42–33
76	Saturday, Jul 24	@ Philadelphia Athletics	6–7	42–34
77	Sunday, Jul 25	@ Brooklyn Grays	3–6	42–35
78	Tuesday, Jul 27	@ New York Metropolitans	1–8	42–36
79	Wednesday, Jul 28	@ Brooklyn Grays	6–10	42–37
80	Thursday, Jul 29	@ New York Metropolitans	11–2	43–37
81	Saturday, Jul 31	@ New York Metropolitans	6–7	43–38

August: 19–6 (Home: 8–5; Away: 11–1)

#	Date	Opponent	Score	Record
82	Sunday, Aug 1	@ Brooklyn Grays	10–9	44–38
83	Tuesday, Aug 3	Brooklyn Grays	18–0	45–38
84	Wednesday, Aug 4	Brooklyn Grays	5–3	46–38
85	Thursday, Aug 5	Brooklyn Grays	3–4	46–39
86	Friday, Aug 6	Baltimore Orioles	1–3	46–40
87	Saturday, Aug 7	Baltimore Orioles	11–2	47–40
88	Monday, Aug 9	Baltimore Orioles	7–2	48–40
89	Tuesday, Aug 10	Philadelphia Athletics	14–7	49–40
90	Wednesday, Aug 11	Philadelphia Athletics	2–3	49–41
91	Thursday, Aug 12	Philadelphia Athletics	7–4	50–41
92	Monday, Aug 16	New York Metropolitans	1–0	51–41
93	Tuesday, Aug 17	New York Metropolitans	5–7	51–42
94	Wednesday, Aug 18	New York Metropolitans	0–2	51–43
95	Thursday, Aug 19	@ St. Louis Browns	6–0	52–43
96	Friday, Aug 20	@ St. Louis Browns	3–0	53–43
97	Saturday, Aug 21	@ St. Louis Browns	3–7	53–44
98	Sunday, Aug 22	@ St. Louis Browns	6–4	54–44
99	Monday, Aug 23	@ Louisville Colonels	6–3	55–44
100	Tuesday, Aug 24	@ Louisville Colonels	7–3	56–44
101	Wednesday, Aug 25	@ Louisville Colonels	7–2	57–44
102	Thursday, Aug 26	@ Louisville Colonels	7–0	58–44
103	Friday, Aug 27	@ Cincinnati Red Stockings	11–8	59–44
104	Saturday, Aug 28	@ Cincinnati Red Stockings	10–2	60–44
105	Sunday, Aug 29	@ Cincinnati Red Stockings	11–9	61–44
106	Tuesday, Aug 31	Louisville Colonels	7–5	62–44

September: 12–10 (Home: 7–6; Away: 5–4)

#	Date	Opponent	Score	Record
107	Wednesday, Sep 1	Louisville Colonels	1–5	62–45
108	Thursday, Sep 2	Louisville Colonels	6–2	63–45
109	Friday, Sep 3	Cincinnati Red Stockings	3–5	63–46
110	Saturday, Sep 4	Cincinnati Red Stockings	1–0	64–46
111	Monday, Sep 6	Cincinnati Red Stockings	13–4	65–46
112	Tuesday, Sep 7	St. Louis Browns	1–2	65–47
113	Wednesday, Sep 8	St. Louis Browns	4–8	65–48
114	Wednesday, Sep 8	St. Louis Browns	2–6	65–49
115	Thursday, Sep 9	St. Louis Browns	4–3	66–49
116	Friday, Sep 10	@ Philadelphia Athletics	4–3	67–49
117	Saturday, Sep 11	@ Philadelphia Athletics	10–18	67–50
118	Monday, Sep 13	@ Philadelphia Athletics	7–7	67–50
119	Tuesday, Sep 14	@ Baltimore Orioles	3–3	67–50
120	Thursday, Sep 16	@ Baltimore Orioles	6–0	68–50
121	Friday, Sep 17	@ New York Metropolitans	4–7	68–51
122	Saturday, Sep 18	@ Brooklyn Grays	7–4	69–51
123	Monday, Sep 20	@ New York Metropolitans	5–7	69–52
124	Tuesday, Sep 21	@ Brooklyn Grays	7–10	69–53
125	Wednesday, Sep 22	@ New York Metropolitans	7–0	70–53
126	Thursday, Sep 23	@ Brooklyn Grays	8–2	71–53
127	Saturday, Sep 25	Philadelphia Athletics	5–1	72–53
128	Monday, Sep 27	Philadelphia Athletics	5–1	73–53
129	Wednesday, Sep 29	Philadelphia Athletics	3–6	73–54
130	Thursday, Sep 30	Brooklyn Grays	12–0	74–54

October: 6–3 (Home: 6–3; Away: 0–0)

#	Date	Opponent	Score	Record
131	Friday, Oct 1	Brooklyn Grays	7–2	75–54
132	Saturday, Oct 2	Brooklyn Grays	4–6	75–55
133	Tuesday, Oct 5	Baltimore Orioles	3–6	75–56
134	Tuesday, Oct 5	Baltimore Orioles	3–3	75–56
135	Wednesday, Oct 6	Baltimore Orioles	0–6	75–57
136	Thursday, Oct 7	Baltimore Orioles	7–1	76–57
137	Friday, Oct 8	New York Metropolitans	9–0	77–57
138	Saturday, Oct 9	New York Metropolitans	4–2	78–57
139	Monday, Oct 11	New York Metropolitans	4–1	79–57
140	Tuesday, Oct 12	New York Metropolitans	7–2	80–57

Legend: = Win = Loss = Tie

== Roster ==
1886 Pittsburgh Alleghenys roster
Pitchers: Bill Bishop; Pud Galvin; Jim Handiboe; John Hofford; Ed Morris	Catchers: Fred Carroll; Tom Quinn; Dan Sullivan; Infielders: Sam Barkley; Doggie Miller; Frank Mountain; Frank Ringo; Otto Schomberg; Pop Smith; Art Whitney	Outfielders: Tom Brown; John Coleman; Ed Glenn; Bill Kuehne; Fred Mann	Manager: Horace B. Phillips

== Player stats ==
Batters

Note: G = Games played; AB = At bats; H = Hits; Avg. = Batting average; HR = Home runs; RBI = Runs batted in

Regular season
Player	G	AB	H	Avg.	HR	RBI
Sam Barkley	122	478	127	0.266	1	69
Bill Bishop	2	7	1	0.143	0	0
Tom Brown	115	460	131	0.285	1	51
Fred Carroll	122	486	140	0.288	5	64
John Coleman	11	43	15	0.349	0	9
Pud Galvin	50	194	49	0.253	0	21
Ed Glenn	71	277	53	0.191	0	26
Jim Handiboe	14	44	5	0.114	0	2
John Hofford	9	34	10	0.294	0	5
Bill Kuehne	117	481	98	0.204	1	48
Fred Mann	116	440	110	0.250	2	60
Doggie Miller	83	317	80	0.252	2	36
Ed Morris	64	227	38	0.167	1	24
Frank Mountain	18	55	8	0.145	0	2
Tom Quinn	3	11	0	0.000	0	0
Frank Ringo	15	56	12	0.214	0	5
Otto Schomberg	72	246	67	0.272	1	29
Pop Smith	126	483	105	0.217	2	57
Dan Sullivan	1	4	0	0.000	0	0
Art Whitney	136	511	122	0.239	0	55
Totals		4,854	1,171	0.241	16	563

Pitchers

Note: G = Games pitched; IP = Innings pitched; W = Wins; L = Losses; ERA = Earned run average; SO = Strikeouts

Regular season
Player	G	IP	W	L	ERA	SO
Bill Bishop	2	17	0	1	3.18	4
Tom Brown	1	2	0	0	9.00	1
Pud Galvin	50	434 2/3	29	21	2.67	72
Jim Handiboe	14	114	7	7	3.32	83
John Hofford	9	81	3	6	4.33	25
Ed Morris	64	555 1/3	41	20	2.45	326
Frank Mountain	2	16	0	2	7.88	2
Art Whitney	1	6	0	0	3.00	2
Totals		1,226	57	80	2.83	515

== Notable transactions ==
- April 1886: Milt Scott was assigned by the Alleghenys to the Baltimore Orioles.
