= Thomas Terrell =

Thomas or Tom Terrell may refer to:

- Thomas F. Terrell (1866–1939), American politician
- Tom Terrell (baseball) (John Thomas Terrell, 1867–1893), American baseball player
- Tom Terrell (journalist) (Thomas Gerald Terrell, 1950–2007), American music journalist
- Thomas Terrell (basketball) (born 1979), American basketball player

== See also ==
- Jay Thomas (Jon Thomas Terrell, 1948–2017), American actor
- T. Terrell Sessums (Thomas Terrell Sessums, 1930–2020), American politician
- Terrell Brandon (Thomas Terrell Brandon, born 1970), American basketball player
- Terrell Thomas (born 1985), American football player
