= 1886 St. Louis Browns season =

Major League Baseball season

1886 St. Louis Browns
- World Series Champion; American Association Champion
- League: American Association
- Ballpark: Sportsman's Park
- City: St. Louis, Missouri
- Record: 93–46 (.669)
- League place: 1st
- Owner: Chris von der Ahe
- Manager: Charlie Comiskey
- Stats: ESPN.com; Baseball Reference

The 1886 St. Louis Browns season was the team's fifth season in St. Louis, Missouri, and the fifth season in the American Association. The Browns went 93–46 during the season and finished first in the American Association, winning their second pennant in a row. In the World Series the Browns played the National League champion Chicago White Stockings, winning the series 4 games to 2. This was the only win by the AA in seven postseason contests with the NL from 1884 to 1890.

== Regular season ==
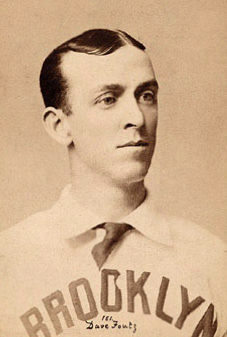
Pitcher Dave Foutz led the AA with 41 wins and a 2.11 ERA.

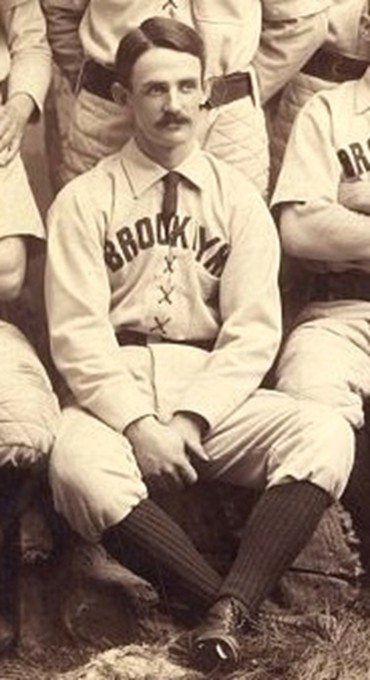
Pitcher Bob Caruthers won 30 games, and his 2.32 ERA ranked second in the AA.

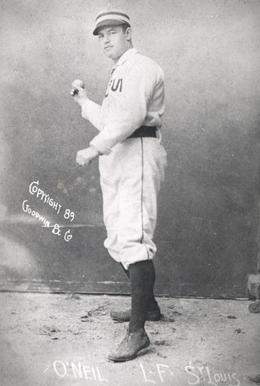
Left fielder Tip O'Neill batted .328 and led the AA with 107 RBI.

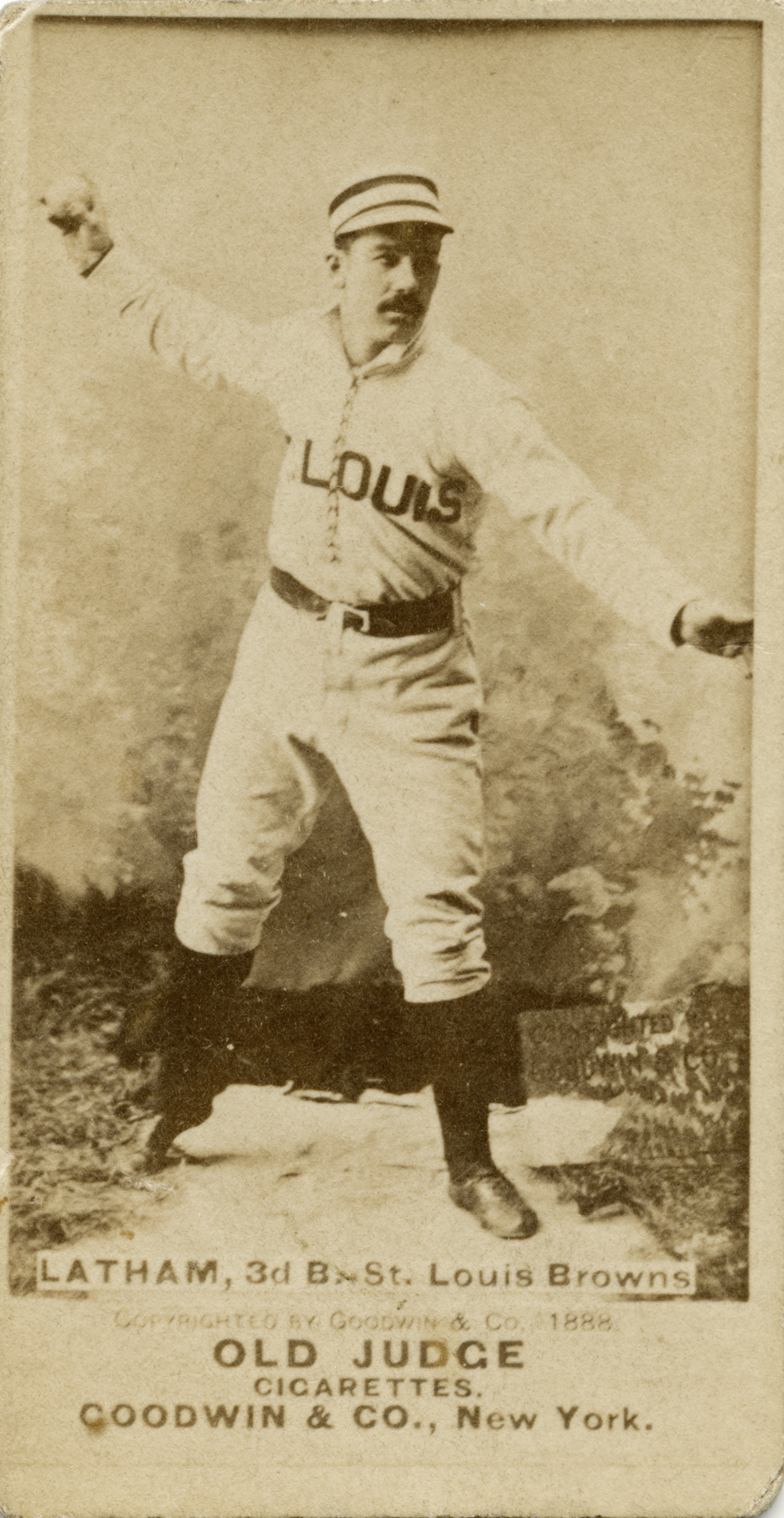
Third baseman Arlie Latham batted .301 and led the AA with 152 runs scored.

=== Season standings ===
American Association
| Team | W | L | Pct. | GB | Home | Road |
|---|---|---|---|---|---|---|
| St. Louis Browns | 93 | 46 | .669 | — | 52‍–‍18 | 41‍–‍28 |
| Pittsburgh Alleghenys | 80 | 57 | .584 | 12 | 45‍–‍28 | 35‍–‍29 |
| Brooklyn Grays | 76 | 61 | .555 | 16 | 44‍–‍25 | 32‍–‍36 |
| Louisville Colonels | 66 | 70 | .485 | 25½ | 37‍–‍30 | 29‍–‍40 |
| Cincinnati Red Stockings | 65 | 73 | .471 | 27½ | 40‍–‍31 | 25‍–‍42 |
| Philadelphia Athletics | 63 | 72 | .467 | 28 | 38‍–‍31 | 25‍–‍41 |
| New York Metropolitans | 53 | 82 | .393 | 38 | 30‍–‍33 | 23‍–‍49 |
| Baltimore Orioles | 48 | 83 | .366 | 41 | 30‍–‍32 | 18‍–‍51 |

=== Record vs. opponents ===
1886 American Association record Sources:
| Team | BAL | BRO | CIN | LOU | NYM | PHA | PIT | STL |
|---|---|---|---|---|---|---|---|---|
| Baltimore | — | 6–14–1 | 5–13–2 | 7–12–2 | 8–9 | 8–10–1 | 7–12–2 | 7–13 |
| Brooklyn | 14–6–1 | — | 13–7 | 13–7 | 10–9–1 | 11–7–2 | 8–12 | 7–13 |
| Cincinnati | 13–5–2 | 7–13 | — | 10–10 | 13–7–1 | 10–10 | 7–13 | 5–15 |
| Louisville | 12–7–2 | 7–13 | 10–10 | — | 11–8 | 9–11 | 7–12 | 10–9 |
| New York | 9–8 | 9–10–1 | 7–13–1 | 8–11 | — | 8–12 | 8–12 | 4–16 |
| Philadelphia | 10–8–1 | 7–11–2 | 10–10 | 11–9 | 12–8 | — | 8–11–1 | 5–15 |
| Pittsburgh | 12–7–2 | 12–8 | 13–7 | 12–7 | 12–8 | 11–8–1 | — | 8–12 |
| St. Louis | 13–7 | 13–7 | 15–5 | 9–10 | 16–4 | 15–5 | 12–8 | — |

=== Roster ===
1886 St. Louis Browns
Roster
| Pitchers: Bob Caruthers; Dave Foutz; Nat Hudson; Jumbo McGinnis; Joe Murphy | Catchers: Doc Bushong; Jumbo Harting; Rudy Kemmler; Infielders: Charlie Comiskey; Bill Gleason; Arlie Latham; Trick McSorley; Yank Robinson | Outfielders: Hugh Nicol; Tip O'Neill; Curt Welch | Manager: Charlie Comiskey |

== Player stats ==
=== Batting ===
==== Starters by position ====
Note: Pos = Position; G = Games played; AB = At bats; H = Hits; Avg. = Batting average; HR = Home runs; RBI = Runs batted in

| Pos | Player | G | AB | H | Avg. | HR | RBI |
|---|---|---|---|---|---|---|---|
| C | Doc Bushong | 107 | 386 | 86 | .223 | 1 | 31 |
| 1B | Charlie Comiskey | 131 | 578 | 147 | .254 | 3 | 76 |
| 2B | Yank Robinson | 133 | 481 | 132 | .274 | 3 | 71 |
| SS | Bill Gleason | 125 | 524 | 141 | .269 | 0 | 61 |
| 3B | Arlie Latham | 134 | 578 | 174 | .301 | 1 | 47 |
| OF | Tip O'Neill | 138 | 579 | 190 | .328 | 3 | 107 |
| OF | Curt Welch | 138 | 563 | 158 | .281 | 2 | 95 |
| OF | Hugh Nicol | 67 | 253 | 52 | .206 | 0 | 19 |

==== Other batters ====
Note: G = Games played; AB = At bats; H = Hits; Avg. = Batting average; HR = Home runs; RBI = Runs batted in

| Player | G | AB | H | Avg. | HR | RBI |
|---|---|---|---|---|---|---|
| Dave Foutz | 102 | 414 | 116 | .280 | 3 | 59 |
| Bob Caruthers | 87 | 317 | 106 | .334 | 4 | 61 |
| Nat Hudson | 43 | 150 | 35 | .233 | 0 | 17 |
| Rudy Kemmler | 35 | 123 | 17 | .138 | 0 | 6 |
| Jumbo McGinnis | 10 | 37 | 7 | .189 | 0 | 4 |
| Trick McSorley | 5 | 20 | 3 | .150 | 0 | 0 |
| Jumbo Harting | 1 | 3 | 1 | .333 | 0 | 1 |
| Joe Murphy | 1 | 3 | 0 | .000 | 0 | 0 |

=== Pitching ===
==== Starting pitchers ====
Note: G = Games pitched; IP = Innings pitched; W = Wins; L = Losses; ERA = Earned run average; SO = Strikeouts

| Player | G | IP | W | L | ERA | SO |
|---|---|---|---|---|---|---|
| Dave Foutz | 59 | 504.0 | 41 | 16 | 2.11 | 283 |
| Bob Caruthers | 44 | 387.1 | 30 | 14 | 2.32 | 166 |
| Nat Hudson | 29 | 234.1 | 16 | 10 | 3.03 | 100 |
| Jumbo McGinnis | 10 | 87.2 | 5 | 5 | 3.80 | 30 |
| Yank Robinson | 1 | 9.0 | 0 | 1 | 3.00 | 1 |
| Joe Murphy | 1 | 7.0 | 1 | 0 | 3.86 | 3 |
