= Hardie Henderson =

American baseball player (1862–1903)

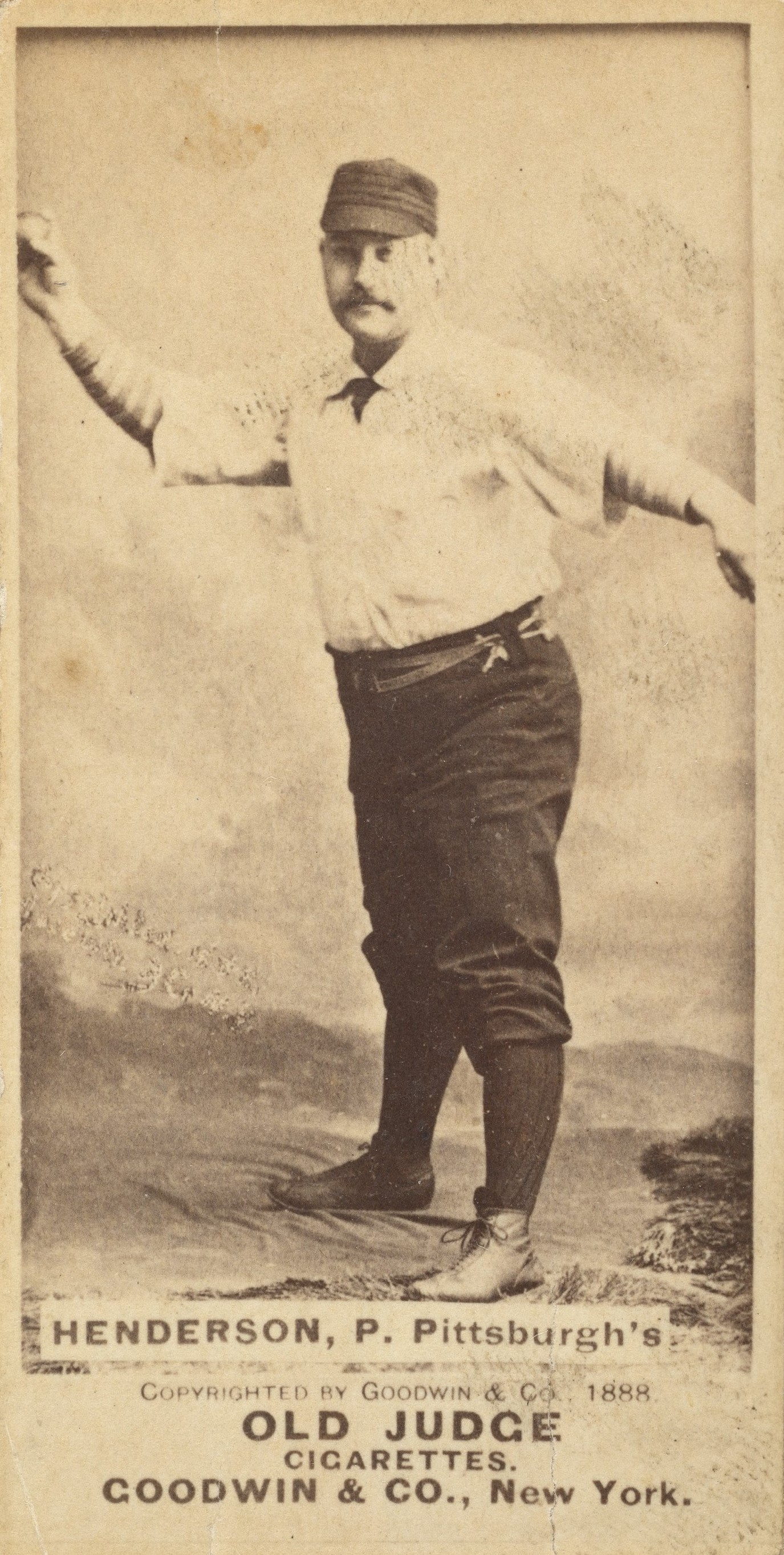
- 1888 baseball card of Henderson
- Pitcher
- Born: October 31, 1862; Philadelphia, Pennsylvania, U.S.
- Died: February 6, 1903 (aged 40); Philadelphia, Pennsylvania, U.S.
- Batted: Right Threw: Right

MLB debut
- May 2, 1883, for the Philadelphia Quakers

Last MLB appearance
- May 24, 1888, for the Pittsburgh Alleghenys

MLB statistics
- Win–loss record: 81–121
- Earned run average: 3.50
- Strikeouts: 930
- Stats at Baseball Reference

Teams
- Philadelphia Quakers (1883); Baltimore Orioles (1883–1886); Brooklyn Grays (1886–1887); Pittsburgh Alleghenys (1888)

James Harding "Hardie" Henderson (October 31, 1862 – February 6, 1903) was an American Major League Baseball pitcher from 1883 to 1888. He played for the Philadelphia Quakers, Baltimore Orioles, Brooklyn Grays, and Pittsburgh Alleghenys, and he had a win–loss record of 81–121.

== Early life ==
Henderson was born in Philadelphia on October 31, 1862.

== Baseball playing career ==
=== Early baseball career ===
Henderson made his professional baseball debut in the League Alliance in 1882. He made his National League debut on May 2, 1883, for the Philadelphia Quakers, as an outfielder. The next day, he made his pitching debut against the Providence Grays. Henderson gave up 19 earned runs and 26 hits, and struck out two batters. Providence won the game 24–6, with Charles Radbourn getting the win. Later that month, he was acquired by the Baltimore Orioles.

=== Baltimore Orioles ===
On May 29, 1883, Henderson made his pitching debut for the Baltimore Orioles of the American Association. Henderson and the Orioles lost to the Louisville Colonels 11–3. In his first year with Baltimore, Henderson finished with a 10–32 win–loss record, a 4.02 earned run average, and 145 strikeouts. He continued playing for the Orioles in 1884 and 1885. In 1884, Henderson led the American Association in walks allowed with 116. He led the Association in 1885 in losses with 35, hits allowed with 539, walks allowed with 117, and wild pitches with 51. He began the 1886 season with Baltimore, pitching in 19 games, but joined the Brooklyn Grays midway through the season.

=== Off-field issues ===
During his time with the Orioles, Henderson was involved in a number of off-field incidents that got him in trouble. In September 1883, he got into a brawl with two of his teammates over a girl at a masked ball in Baltimore. They were all arrested, and Henderson was fined $150 for public drunkenness. He was arrested a second time in July 1884 when multiple players from the Orioles and St. Louis Browns got into a fight at a party in St. Louis. Reports said that Henderson acted so out of control on the trip to the police station that "extreme measures" were used to stop him from attempting to attack Browns outfielder Fred Lewis.

=== Brooklyn and Pittsburgh ===
Henderson made his Brooklyn pitching debut on August 19, 1886, against the New York Metropolitans, losing the game 5–1. He pitched in 14 total games for Brooklyn in 1886, finishing with a 10–4 record and a 2.90 earned run average. Brooklyn finished in third place in the American Association that season. Henderson played the 1887 season in Brooklyn, but he was acquired by the Pittsburgh Alleghenys for 1888, pitching in five games for Pittsburgh. He would not play in the major league again. He finished with an 81–121 win–loss record, a 3.50 earned run average, and 930 strikeouts. Over Henderson's 230 major league games, 210 of them were as a pitcher, 16 of them as an outfielder, two as a shortstop, one as a second baseman, and one as a third baseman. After not playing at any level in 1889, Henderson returned to baseball in 1890, playing for Sioux City in the minor league Western League, now known as the American League.

== Umpiring ==
In parts of three seasons, Henderson was used as a major league umpire. First, on June 16, 1889, he umpired an American Association game. Later, in 1895, he umpired 11 National League games. The next season, he umpired 51 NL games, the last of which was on September 12, 1896.

== Death ==
On February 6, 1903, Henderson died at the age of 40 in Philadelphia, when he was run over by a train trolley. He was buried in Fernwood Cemetery in Delaware County, Pennsylvania.
