= Rex Smith (baseball) =

American baseball player (1864–1895)

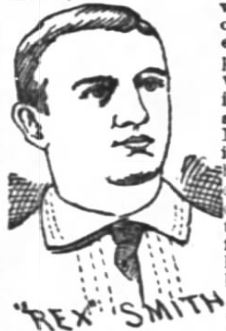
- Pitcher
- Born: January 4, 1861; Louisville, Kentucky, U.S.
- Died: June 21, 1895 (aged 34); Louisville, Kentucky, U.S.
- Batted: Unknown Threw: Right

MLB debut
- May 31, 1886, for the Cincinnati Red Stockings

Last MLB appearance
- July 11, 1886, for the Philadelphia Athletics

MLB statistics
- Win–loss record: 0–1
- Earned run average: 7.00
- Strikeouts: 4
- Stats at Baseball Reference

Teams
- Cincinnati Red Stockings (1886); Philadelphia Athletics (1886)

Rex Smith (born Henry W. Schmidt; January 4, 1864 – June 21, 1895) was an American professional baseball player who pitched in the American Association for the 1886 Philadelphia Athletics and Cincinnati Red Stockings.

That first appearance was the result of Cincinnati ace Tony Mullane refusing to pitch the game, according to the next day's Cincinnati Commercial Tribune, which does not give Mullane's reason for refusing to play. In that snippet, he is only identified as Smith and is said to be from Jersey City, New Jersey. The Brooklyn Eagle from the same date – Cincinnati was facing the Brooklyn Grays – says that Mr. Smith was from Louisville, Kentucky. The reconciliation between these two apparently contradictory facts can be found in the May 19 issue of Sporting Life, which says Jersey City has a new pitcher called Rex Smith who hails from Louisville. That makes him the same man who pitched a game for Philadelphia later in the season.
