= John Shaffer (baseball) =

American baseball player (1864–1926)

- Pitcher
- Born: February 18, 1864; Lock Haven, Pennsylvania, U.S.
- Died: November 21, 1926 (aged 62); Endicott, New York, U.S.
- Batted: Unknown Threw: Right

MLB debut
- September 13, 1886, for the New York Metropolitans

Last MLB appearance
- June 30, 1887, for the New York Metropolitans

MLB statistics
- Win–loss record: 7-14
- Earned run average: 4.57
- Strikeouts: 58
- Batting average: .192
- Stats at Baseball Reference

Teams
- New York Metropolitans (1886–1887)

John W. Shaffer, nicknamed Cannon Ball, (February 18, 1864 – November 21, 1926) was an American professional baseball player. He played for the 1886 and 1887 New York Metropolitans. He continued to play in the minor leagues through 1897.
