= Clarence Stephens (baseball) =

American baseball player (1863–1947)

- Pitcher
- Born: August 19, 1863; Cincinnati
- Died: February 28, 1947 (aged 83); Cincinnati
- Batted: Unknown Threw: Right

MLB debut
- October 8, 1886, for the Cincinnati Red Stockings

Last MLB appearance
- September 23, 1891, for the Cincinnati Reds

MLB statistics
- Win–loss record: 1–1
- Earned run average: 6.75
- Strikeouts: 9
- Stats at Baseball Reference

Teams
- Cincinnati Red Stockings (1886); Cincinnati Reds (1891)

Clarence Wright Stephens (August 19, 1863 – February 28, 1947) was a pitcher for Major League Baseball in the 19th century. He started one game for the Cincinnati Red Stockings in 1886 and one game for the Cincinnati Reds in 1891. Both were complete game appearances, with one win and one loss.

== Sources ==
- Career statistics from Baseball Reference
