= Jeremiah Reardon =

American baseball player (1868–1907)

- Pitcher
- Born: September 1868; St. Louis, Missouri, U.S.
- Died: April 22, 1907 (aged 38); St. Louis, Missouri, U.S.
- Batted: Unknown Threw: Unknown

MLB debut
- July 17, 1886, for the St. Louis Maroons

Last MLB appearance
- August 31, 1886, for the Cincinnati Red Stockings

MLB statistics
- Win–loss record: 0–2
- Strikeouts: 0
- Earned run average: 9.00
- Stats at Baseball Reference

Teams
- St. Louis Maroons (1886); Cincinnati Red Stockings (1886)

Jeremiah J. Reardon (September 1868 – April 22, 1907) was an American pitcher in Major League Baseball in the 19th century. He played for the Cincinnati Red Stockings and St. Louis Maroons.

== Sources ==
- Career statistics from Baseball Reference · Baseball Reference (Minors) · Retrosheet · Baseball Almanac
