= Jack Heinzman =

American baseball player (1863–1914)

- First baseman
- Born: September 27, 1863; New Albany, Indiana, U.S.
- Died: November 10, 1914 (aged 51); Louisville, Kentucky, U.S.
- Batted: Right Threw: Right

MLB debut
- October 2, 1886, for the Louisville Colonels

Last MLB appearance
- October 2, 1886, for the Louisville Colonels

MLB statistics
- At-bats: 5
- Runs: 1
- Stats at Baseball Reference

Teams
- Louisville Colonels (1886)

John Peter "Jack" Heinzman (September 27, 1863 – November 10, 1914) was a professional baseball player. His playing career spanned four seasons, including one where he played one game in Major League Baseball.

== Professional career ==
Heinzman began his professional career in 1884 with the Harrisburg Olympics of the Eastern League. The next season, Heinzman played for the Macon, Georgia baseball club in the Southern League. In 1886, Heinzman played for the Macon club, the Class-B Chattanooga Lookouts, and the major league Louisville Colonels. In the minors that season, Heinzman batted a combined .240 with 12 doubles in 59 games. In the majors, Heinzman didn't get a hit in 5 at-bats with 1 run. Heinzman's last season in pro-baseball was 1889 with the Evansville Hoosiers of the Central Interstate League.

== Death ==
On November 10, 1914, Heinzman died in Louisville, Kentucky, and he was laid to rest at Saint Louis Cemetery in Louisville.
