= Jim Handiboe =

American baseball player (1866–1942)

- Pitcher
- Born: July 17, 1866; Columbus, Ohio, U.S.
- Died: November 8, 1942 (aged 76); Columbus, Ohio, U.S.
- Batted: Right Threw: Right

MLB debut
- May 28, 1886, for the Pittsburgh Alleghenys

Last MLB appearance
- September 8, 1886, for the Pittsburgh Alleghenys

MLB statistics
- Win–loss record: 7–7
- Earned run average: 3.32
- Strikeouts: 83
- Stats at Baseball Reference

Teams
- Pittsburgh Alleghenys (1886)

James Edward Handiboe (July 17, 1866 – November 8, 1942) was an American professional baseball player who played pitcher in the Major Leagues for the 1886 Pittsburgh Alleghenys. He played minor league baseball until 1901.
