= Bill Hart (pitcher) =

American baseball player (1865–1936)

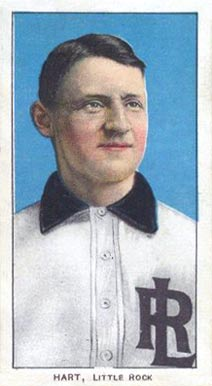
- Pitcher
- Born: July 19, 1865; Louisville, Kentucky, U.S.
- Died: September 19, 1936 (aged 71); Cincinnati, Ohio, U.S.
- Batted: Unknown Threw: Right

MLB debut
- July 26, 1886, for the Philadelphia Athletics

Last MLB appearance
- July 30, 1901, for the Cleveland Blues

MLB statistics
- Win–loss record: 66-120
- Earned run average: 4.65
- Strikeouts: 431
- Stats at Baseball Reference

Teams
- Philadelphia Athletics (1886–1887); Brooklyn Grooms (1892); Pittsburgh Pirates (1895; St. Louis Browns (1896–1897); Pittsburgh Pirates (1898); Cleveland Blues (1901)

William Franklin Hart (July 19, 1865 – September 19, 1936) was an American professional baseball player who played pitcher in the Major Leagues from 1886 to 1901. Hart pitched in the American Association, National League and American League.
