= William Hyndman (baseball) =

American baseball player (1854–1920)

- Outfielder / Pitcher
- Born: October 1, 1854; Philadelphia
- Died: January 14, 1920 (aged 65); Philadelphia
- Batted: Unknown Threw: Unknown

MLB debut
- July 23, 1886, for the Philadelphia Athletics

Last MLB appearance
- July 23, 1886, for the Philadelphia Athletics

MLB statistics
- Batting average: .000
- Home runs: 0
- Runs batted in: 0
- Stats at Baseball Reference

Teams
- Philadelphia Athletics (1886)

William S. Hyndman (October 1, 1854 – January 14, 1920) was an American baseball player who played for the 1886 Philadelphia Athletics.
