= William Zay =

American baseball player

- Pitcher
- Born: Pittsburgh, Pennsylvania, US

MLB debut
- October 7, 1886, for the Baltimore Orioles

Last MLB appearance
- October 7, 1886, for the Baltimore Orioles

MLB statistics
- Win–loss record: 0-1
- Strikeouts: 2
- Earned run average: 9.00
- Stats at Baseball Reference

Teams
- Baltimore Orioles (1886)

William Zay was an American professional baseball pitcher. He played one game for the 1886 Baltimore Orioles franchise in Major League Baseball. He started, threw two innings, giving up 4 hits and 4 walks while striking out two batters in taking the loss. His career ERA was 9.00.

Zay was born in Pittsburgh, Pennsylvania.
