= Bill Bishop (1880s pitcher) =

American baseball player

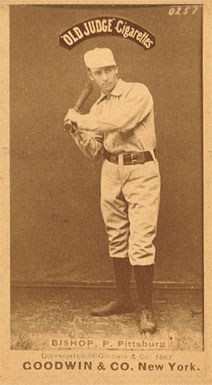
- Pitcher
- Born: December 27, 1864 or 1869; Adamsburg, Pennsylvania, U.S.
- Died: December 15, 1932; Chicago, Illinois, U.S.
- Batted: Right Threw: Right

MLB debut
- September 13, 1886, for the Pittsburgh Alleghenys

Last MLB appearance
- September 19, 1889, for the Chicago White Stockings

MLB statistics
- Win–loss record: 0-4
- Earned run average: 9.96
- Strikeouts: 9
- Stats at Baseball Reference

Teams
- Pittsburgh Alleghenys (1886–1887); Chicago White Stockings (1889)

William Robinson Bishop (December 27, 1864 or 1869 – December 15, 1932) was an American professional baseball player. He was a pitcher over parts of three seasons (1886–1887, 1889) with the Pittsburgh Alleghenys and Chicago White Stockings. For his career, he compiled an 0–4 record in seven appearances, with a 9.96 earned run average and nine strikeouts.

There is disagreement about the year of Bishop's birth. Retrosheet and Baseball-Reference list his year of birth as 1864, whereas Fangraphs lists his birth year as 1869. If Fangraphs is correct, Bishop was one of the youngest players in Major League Baseball history, making his debut at roughly 16 years, nine months old.

== See also ==
- List of Major League Baseball annual saves leaders
