= Tom Sullivan (1880s pitcher) =

American baseball player (1860–1947)

- Pitcher
- Born: March 1, 1860; New York, New York, U.S.
- Died: April 12, 1947 (aged 87); Cincinnati, Ohio, U.S.
- Batted: Unknown Threw: Unknown

MLB debut
- September 27, 1884, for the Columbus Buckeyes

Last MLB appearance
- June 23, 1889, for the Kansas City Cowboys

MLB statistics
- Win–loss record: 14–33
- Earned run average: 4.04
- Strikeouts: 147
- Stats at Baseball Reference

Teams
- Columbus Buckeyes (1884); Louisville Colonels (1886); Kansas City Cowboys (1888–1889)

Thomas Sullivan (March 1, 1860 – April 12, 1947) was an American Major League Baseball pitcher who played for the Columbus Buckeyes, Louisville Colonels and Kansas City Cowboys in the American Association from 1884 to 1889.
