= Ed Clark (baseball) =

American baseball player (1863–1927)

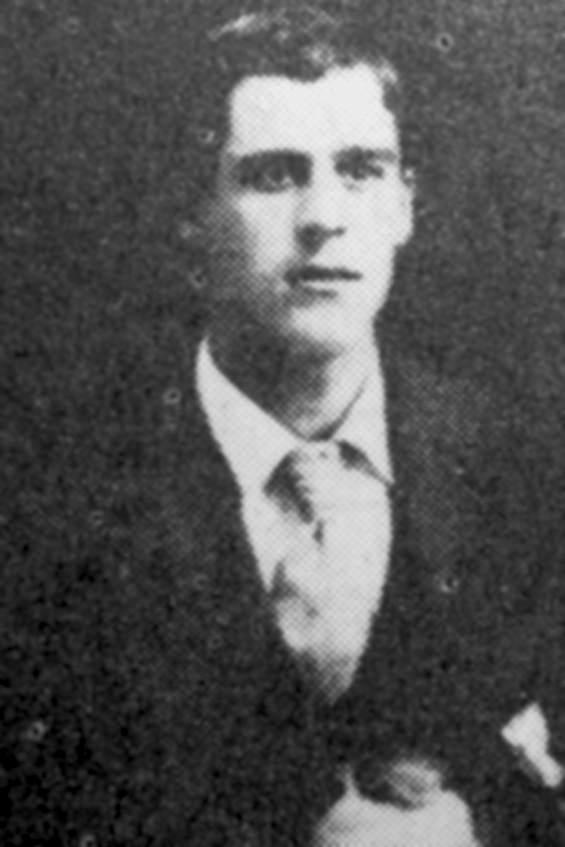
- Pitcher
- Born: 1863; Cincinnati, Ohio, U.S.
- Died: November 7, 1927 (aged 63–64); Hampton, Virginia, U.S.
- Batted: Unknown Threw: Unknown

MLB debut
- July 4, 1886, for the Philadelphia Athletics

Last MLB appearance
- July 4, 1886, for the Philadelphia Athletics

MLB statistics
- Win–loss record: 0–1
- Earned run average: 5.40
- Strikeouts: 3
- Stats at Baseball Reference

Teams
- Philadelphia Athletics (1886)

Edmund C. Clark (1863 – November 7, 1927) was an American professional baseball player who pitched in the Major Leagues for the 1886 Philadelphia Athletics in one game and pitched in one game in the Major Leagues for the 1891 Columbus Solons.
