= Fred Mauer =

American baseball player (1862–1922)

- Outfielder / Pitcher
- Born: April 19, 1862; Hamburg, New Jersey
- Died: April 19, 1922 (aged 60); Schenectady, New York
- Batted: Unknown Threw: Unknown

MLB debut
- July 24, 1886, for the New York Metropolitans

Last MLB appearance
- July 24, 1886, for the New York Metropolitans

MLB statistics
- Win–loss record: 0–1
- Earned run average: 36.00
- Strikeouts: 0
- Stats at Baseball Reference

Teams
- New York Metropolitans (1886)

Frederick H. Mauer (April 19, 1862 – April 19, 1922) was an American baseball player. He played in one game for the 1886 New York Metropolitans, pitching two innings and also playing the outfield.
