= William Houseman =

American baseball player (1859–1894)

- Pitcher
- Born: October 1859; Baltimore, Maryland
- Died: November 2, 1894 (aged 35); Baltimore, Maryland
- Batted: Unknown Threw: Unknown

MLB debut
- September 2, 1886, for the Baltimore Orioles

Last MLB appearance
- September 2, 1886, for the Baltimore Orioles

MLB statistics
- Win–loss record: 0–1
- Strikeouts: 5
- Earned run average: 3.38
- Stats at Baseball Reference

Teams
- Baltimore Orioles (1886)

William H. Houseman (1859–1894), was a Major League Baseball pitcher for the 1886 Baltimore Orioles. He appeared in one game for the Orioles on September 2, 1886, pitching a complete game. He picked up the loss, allowing three runs and six hits.
