= Tom Terrell (baseball) =

American baseball player (1867–1893)

- Catcher / Left fielder
- Born: June 29, 1867; Louisville, Kentucky
- Died: July 9, 1893 (aged 26); Louisville, Kentucky
- Batted: Unknown Threw: Unknown

MLB debut
- October 5, 1886, for the Louisville Colonels

Last MLB appearance
- October 5, 1886, for the Louisville Colonels

MLB statistics
- At-bats: 4
- Hits: 1
- Stats at Baseball Reference

Teams
- Louisville Colonels (1886)

John Thomas Terrell (June 29, 1867 – July 9, 1893) was a professional baseball player who played catcher and left fielder. Terrell played one season in pro-baseball and spent part of that season in Major League Baseball.

== Professional career ==
In 1886, Terrell played for the Macon, Georgia, baseball club, and the Louisville Colonels. With the Macon club, Terrell played in 12 games, 5 at the catcher position, and 9 in the outfield. On the offensive side, Terrell batted .237 with 9 hits, and 1 double in 12 games. With the major league Colonels, Terrell played 1 games, and in 4 at-bats he attained 1 hit. He played at both the catcher, and outfield position in that game.

== Death ==
Terrell died on July 9, 1893, in Louisville, Kentucky, also the place of his birth. He was buried in Saint John Cemetery in Louisville.
