= Tony Hellman =

American baseball player (1861–1898)

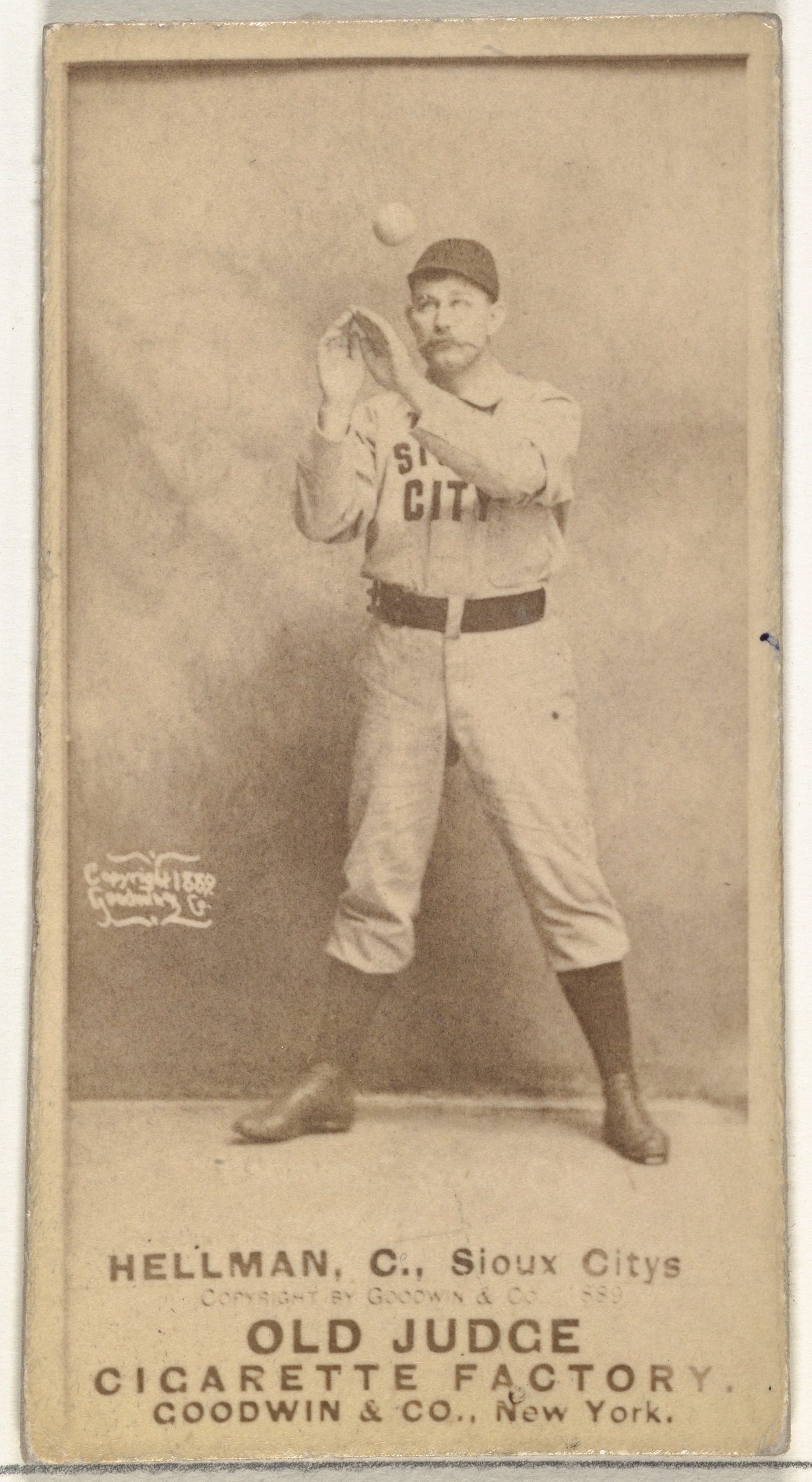
- Catcher
- Born: May 29, 1861; Cincinnati, Ohio
- Died: March 29, 1898 (aged 36); Cincinnati, Ohio
- Batted: Unknown Threw: Unknown

MLB debut
- October 10, 1886, for the Baltimore Orioles

Last MLB appearance
- October 10, 1886, for the Baltimore Orioles

MLB statistics
- Batting average: .000
- Home runs: 0
- Runs batted in: 0
- Stats at Baseball Reference

Teams
- Baltimore Orioles (1886)

Anthony Joseph Hellman (May 29, 1861 – March 19, 1898), was a Major League Baseball player who played catcher. He played for the Baltimore Orioles of the American Association in one game on October 10, 1886. He was hitless in three at-bats in that game. He played in the minor leagues through 1889.
