= Jumbo Harting =

American baseball player (1865–1947)

- Catcher
- Born: March 2, 1865; St. Louis, Missouri
- Died: June 18, 1947 (aged 82); St. Louis, Missouri
- Batted: Unknown Threw: Unknown

MLB debut
- October 5, 1886, for the St. Louis Browns

Last MLB appearance
- October 5, 1886, for the St. Louis Browns

MLB statistics
- Batting average: .333
- Home runs: 0
- Runs batted in: 1
- Stats at Baseball Reference

Teams
- St. Louis Browns (1886)

Edward Harting (March 2, 1865 – June 18, 1947) was a catcher in Major League Baseball, who played in one game on October 5, 1886 for the St. Louis Browns.

- Career statistics from Baseball Reference, or Baseball Reference (Minors)
