= Pat O'Connell (baseball) =

American baseball player (1861–1943)

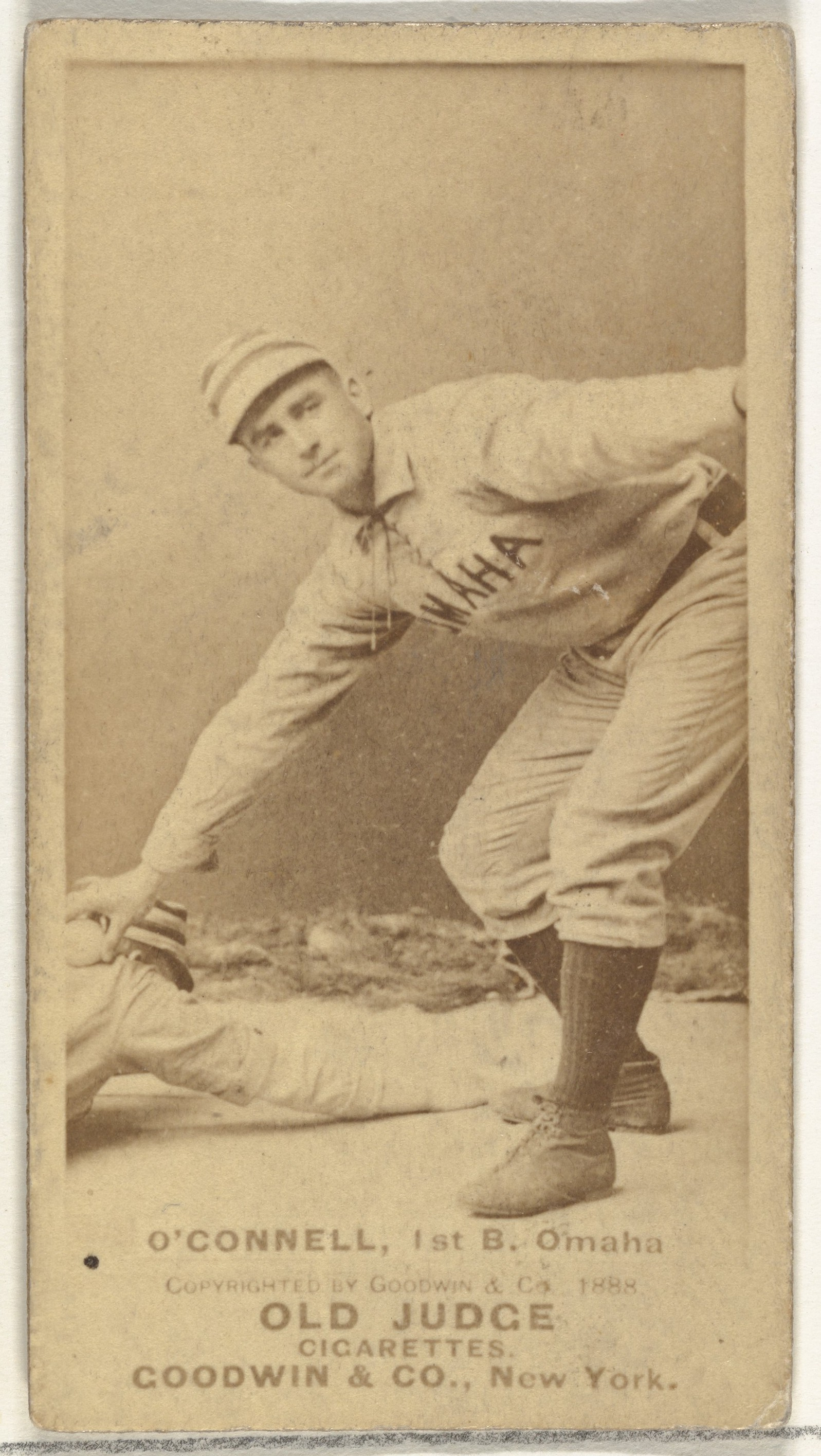
- Center fielder
- Born: June 10, 1861; Bangor, Maine, U.S.
- Died: January 24, 1943 (aged 81); Lewiston, Maine, U.S.
- Batted: Left Threw: Right

MLB debut
- July 22, 1886, for the Baltimore Orioles

Last MLB appearance
- September 9, 1886, for the Baltimore Orioles

MLB statistics
- Batting average: .181
- Home runs: 0
- Runs batted in: 8
- Stats at Baseball Reference

Teams
- Baltimore Orioles (1886)

Patrick H. O'Connell (June 10, 1861 – January 24, 1943) was an American professional baseball center fielder. He played for the Baltimore Orioles of the American Association during the 1886 baseball season. He continued to play in the minor leagues through 1895. He is buried in Mount Hope Cemetery in Lewiston, Maine.
