= Bob Clark (catcher) =

American baseball player (1863–1919)

- Catcher / Outfielder
- Born: March 18, 1863; Covington, Kentucky, U.S.
- Died: August 21, 1919 (aged 56); Covington, Kentucky, U.S.
- Batted: Right Threw: Right

MLB debut
- April 17, 1886, for the Brooklyn Grays

Last MLB appearance
- August 3, 1893, for the Louisville Colonels

MLB statistics
- Batting average: .230
- Home runs: 1
- Runs batted in: 107
- Stats at Baseball Reference

Teams
- Brooklyn Grays/Bridegrooms (1886–1890); Cincinnati Reds (1891); Louisville Colonels (1893)

Career highlights and awards
- 1889 American Association Championship; 1890 National League championship

Robert H. Clark (March 18, 1863 – August 21, 1919) was a 19th-century American Major League Baseball (MLB) catcher. He played from 1886 to 1893 for the Brooklyn Grays/Bridegrooms, Cincinnati Reds and Louisville Colonels. He appeared in the post-season World Series with Brooklyn twice, in 1889 and 1890.

Clark died in Covington, Kentucky, on August 21, 1919, from burns he suffered in a chemical explosion at a Cincinnati factory several months earlier.
