= Fred Lewis (1880s outfielder) =

American baseball player (1858–1945)

- Outfielder
- Born: October 13, 1858; Buffalo, New York, U.S.
- Died: June 5, 1945 (aged 86); Utica, New York, U.S.
- Batted: Switch Threw: Right

MLB debut
- July 2, 1881, for the Boston Red Caps

Last MLB appearance
- August 26, 1886, for the Cincinnati Red Stockings

MLB statistics
- Batting average: .296
- Home runs: 4
- Runs scored: 224
- Stats at Baseball Reference

Teams
- Boston Red Caps (1881); Philadelphia Quakers (1883); St. Louis Browns (1883–1884); St. Louis Maroons (1884–1885); Cincinnati Red Stockings (1886)

Frederick Miller Lewis (October 13, 1858 – June 5, 1945) was a 19th-century American professional baseball outfielder. Lewis played for six seasons from 1881 to 1886 for the Boston Red Caps, Philadelphia Quakers, St. Louis Browns, St. Louis Maroons, and Cincinnati Red Stockings.

== Life ==
Lewis was born on October 13, 1858, in Buffalo, New York. He died on June 5, 1945, in Utica, New York. He was buried at Forest Hill Cemetery in Utica.
