= Dan Bickham =

American baseball player (1864–1951)

- Pitcher
- Born: October 31, 1864; Dayton, Ohio
- Died: March 3, 1951 (aged 86); Dayton, Ohio
- Batted: Right Threw: Right

MLB debut
- August 13, 1886, for the Cincinnati Red Stockings

Last MLB appearance
- August 13, 1886, for the Cincinnati Red Stockings

MLB statistics
- Win–loss record: 1–0
- Strikeouts: 6
- Earned run average: 3.00
- Stats at Baseball Reference

Teams
- Cincinnati Red Stockings (1886)

Daniel Dennison Bickham (October 31, 1864 – March 3, 1951) was a pitcher for Major League Baseball in the 19th century. He played for the 1886 Cincinnati Red Stockings. He started one game for the Red Stockings, he won the game by pitching a complete game where he allowed 13 hits and 11 runs, though only 3 were earned. He never appeared in a Major League game again. He played college baseball at Princeton University.

== Sources ==
- Career statistics from Baseball Reference · Retrosheet
