= Ted Kennedy (baseball) =

American baseball player (1865–1907)

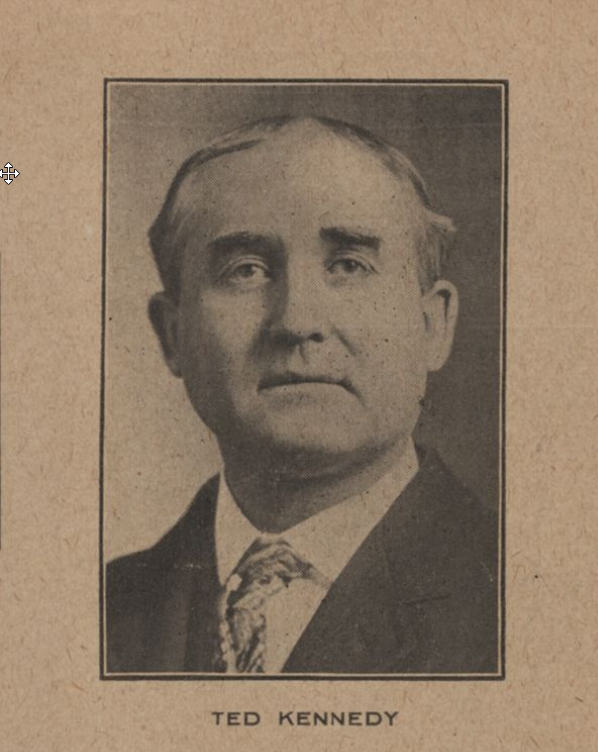
- Pitcher
- Born: February 7, 1865; Henry, Illinois, U.S.
- Died: October 28, 1907 (aged 42); St. Louis, Missouri, U.S.
- Batted: Left Threw: Right

MLB debut
- June 12, 1885, for the Chicago White Stockings

Last MLB appearance
- September 23, 1886, for the Louisville Colonels

MLB statistics
- W-L Record: 12-21
- Earned run average: 4.32
- Strikeout: 118
- Stats at Baseball Reference

Teams
- Chicago White Stockings (1885); Philadelphia Athletics (1886); Louisville Colonels (1886)

Theodore A. Kennedy (February 7, 1865 in Henry, Illinois – October 28, 1907 in St. Louis, Missouri), was an American professional baseball player who played pitcher in the Major Leagues from 1885-1886. He would play for the Louisville Colonels, Philadelphia Athletics, and Chicago White Stockings. Inventor of the baseball catcher's mitt, he sold his patents to the A.G. Spalding Company and opened a baseball school, specializing in teaching the curveball, and also manufactured sporting goods - specifically baseball gloves and catcher's mitts. He also invented a pitching machine and was developing the first electric scoreboard at the time of his death.
