= 1886 Major League Baseball season =

1886 MLB season
- League: American Association (AA); National League (NL)
- Sport: Baseball
- Duration: Regular season: April 17 – October 15, 1886 (AA); April 29 – October 11, 1886 (NL); World's Championship Series: October 18–23, 1886
- Games: 140 (AA); 126 (NL)
- Teams: 16 (8 per league)

Pennant winner
- AA champions: St. Louis Browns
- AA runners-up: Pittsburgh Alleghenys
- NL champions: Chicago White Stockings
- NL runners-up: Detroit Wolverines

World's Championship Series
- Venue: Sportsman's Park, St. Louis, Missouri; West Side Park, Chicago, Illinois
- Champions: St. Louis Browns
- Runners-up: Chicago White Stockings

MLB seasons
- ← 1885 1887 →

Locations of teams for the 1886 American Association season
American Association
Locations of teams for the 1886 National League season
National League

The 1886 major league baseball season began on April 17, 1886. The regular season ended on October 15, with the Chicago White Stockings and the St. Louis Browns as regular season champions of the National League and American Association, respectively. The postseason began with Game 1 of the third World's Championship Series on October 18 and ended with Game 6 on October 23, in what was a best-of-seven-playoff. The Browns defeated the White Stockings, four games to two, capturing their first World's Championship Series.

Over the offseason, the National League's Buffalo Bisons transfer into the minor league International League and Providence Grays fold. The two open spots are filled by the newly enfranchised Kansas City Cowboys and Washington Nationals.

== Schedule ==
The 1886 schedule consisted of 140 games for all American Association teams and 126 games for all National League, each of which had eight teams. Each AA team was scheduled to play 20 games against the other seven teams, while each NL team was scheduled to play 18 games against the other seven teams. Both the AA's 140-game format and NL's 126-game format were newly-implementation for the 1886 season, each replacing the 112-game, 16 games against the other seven teams format that both leagues had from 1884 and 1885. The NL would adopt the AA's format in 1888, and each league would use this 140-game format until 1892.

American Association Opening Day took place on April 17 featuring six teams, while National League Opening Day took place on April 29, also featuring six teams. The American Association would see its final day of the regular season on October 15 with a doubleheader between the New York Metropolitans and Philadelphia Athletics, while the National League would see its final day of the season on October 11 with a game between the Kansas City Cowboys and Washington Nationals. The 1886 World's Championship Series took place between October 18 and October 23.

== Rule changes ==
The 1886 season saw the following rule changes:

- Stolen bases became an official statistic.
- In the American Association, six balls became a base on balls, down from eight, while in the National League, seven balls became a base on balls, up from six.
- The pitcher's box was extended by one foot in the direction of second base, from six to seven feet.
  - In the American Association, a one-foot-long by four-foot-wide smooth flat stone was placed in front of the pitcher's box.
- In the American Association the batter's box was extended by one foot in width, on either side of home plate, expanding from three feet wide and one foot from home plate to four feet wide and six inches from home plate, copying the change the National League did the previous season.
- The American Association allowed home plate to be made out of white stone.
- The reserve rule was expanded to cover 12 players on each team, up from 11 established in 1883.

== Teams ==
League	Team	City	Ballpark	Capacity	Manager
American Association	Baltimore Orioles	Oxford, Maryland	Oriole Park	5,000	Billy Barnie
American Association	Brooklyn Grays	Brooklyn, New York	Washington Park	3,000	Charlie Byrne
American Association	Cincinnati Red Stockings	Cincinnati, Ohio	American Park	3,000	Ollie Caylor
American Association	Louisville Colonels	Louisville, Kentucky	Eclipse Park	5,860	Jim Hart
American Association	New York Metropolitans	St. George, New York	St. George Grounds	5,100	Jim Gifford
American Association	New York Metropolitans	St. George, New York	St. George Grounds	5,100	Bob Ferguson
American Association	Philadelphia Athletics	Philadelphia, Pennsylvania	Jefferson Street Grounds	15,000	Lew Simmons
American Association	Philadelphia Athletics	Philadelphia, Pennsylvania	Jefferson Street Grounds	15,000	Bill Sharsig
American Association	Pittsburgh Alleghenys	Allegheny, Pennsylvania	Recreation Park (Pittsburgh)	17,000	Horace Phillips
American Association	St. Louis Browns	St. Louis, Missouri	Sportsman's Park	12,000	Charles Comiskey
National League	Boston Beaneaters	Boston, Massachusetts	South End Grounds	3,000	John Morrill
National League	Chicago White Stockings	Chicago, Illinois	West Side Park	6,000	Cap Anson
National League	Detroit Wolverines	Detroit, Michigan	Recreation Park (Detroit)	Unknown	Bill Watkins
National League	Kansas City Cowboys	Kansas City, Missouri	League Park	Unknown	Dave Rowe
National League	New York Giants	New York, New York	Polo Grounds	20,709	Jim Mutrie
National League	Philadelphia Quakers	Philadelphia, Pennsylvania	Recreation Park	6,500	Harry Wright
National League	St. Louis Maroons	St. Louis, Missouri	Union Base Ball Park	10,000	Gus Schmelz
National League	Washington Nationals	Washington, D.C.	Swampoodle Grounds	6,000	Michael Scanlon
National League	Washington Nationals	Washington, D.C.	Swampoodle Grounds	6,000	John Gaffney

=== Sunday games ===
Blue laws restricted Sunday activities in several localities, causing the Brooklyn Grays of the American Association (which was informally referred to as the "Beer & Whiskey League" due to its openness on alcohol, compared to the National League) to play at ballparks in a different locality.

Team	City	Ballpark	Capacity	Games played
Brooklyn Grays	Ridgewood, New York	Ridgewood Park	Unknown	14

1. In today's Baltimore, Maryland.
2. In today's New York, New York.
3. In today's Pittsburgh, Pennsylvania.

== Standings ==
=== American Association ===
American Association
Team	W	L	Pct.	GB	Home	Road
St. Louis Browns	93	46	.669	—	52‍–‍18	41‍–‍28
Pittsburgh Alleghenys	80	57	.584	12	45‍–‍28	35‍–‍29
Brooklyn Grays	76	61	.555	16	44‍–‍25	32‍–‍36
Louisville Colonels	66	70	.485	25½	37‍–‍30	29‍–‍40
Cincinnati Red Stockings	65	73	.471	27½	40‍–‍31	25‍–‍42
Philadelphia Athletics	63	72	.467	28	38‍–‍31	25‍–‍41
New York Metropolitans	53	82	.393	38	30‍–‍33	23‍–‍49
Baltimore Orioles	48	83	.366	41	30‍–‍32	18‍–‍51

=== National League ===
National League
Team	W	L	Pct.	GB	Home	Road
Chicago White Stockings	90	34	.726	—	52‍–‍10	38‍–‍24
Detroit Wolverines	87	36	.707	2½	49‍–‍13	38‍–‍23
New York Giants	75	44	.630	12½	47‍–‍12	28‍–‍32
Philadelphia Quakers	71	43	.623	14	45‍–‍14	26‍–‍29
Boston Beaneaters	56	61	.479	30½	32‍–‍26	24‍–‍35
St. Louis Maroons	43	79	.352	46	27‍–‍34	16‍–‍45
Kansas City Cowboys	30	91	.248	58½	17‍–‍40	13‍–‍51
Washington Nationals	28	92	.233	60	19‍–‍43	9‍–‍49

=== Tie games ===
28 tie games (13 in AA, 15 in NL), which are not factored into winning percentage or games behind (and were often replayed again), occurred throughout the season.

==== American Association ====
- Baltimore Orioles, 8
- Brooklyn Grays, 4
- Cincinnati Red Stockings, 3
- Louisville Colonels, 2
- New York Metropolitans, 2
- Philadelphia Athletics, 4
- Pittsburgh Alleghenys, 3

==== National League ====
- Boston Beaneaters, 1
- Chicago White Stockings, 2
- Detroit Wolverines, 3
- Kansas City Cowboys, 5
- New York Giants, 5
- Philadelphia Quakers, 5
- St. Louis Maroons, 4
- Washington Nationals, 5

== Postseason ==
=== Bracket ===
World's Championship Series
AA	St. Louis Browns	0	12^{8}	4	8^{7}	10^{7}	4^{10}*
NL	Chicago White Stockings	6	0	11^{8}*	5	3	3

*Denotes walk-off

== Managerial changes ==
=== Off-season ===
Team	Former Manager	New Manager
Buffalo Bisons	Jack Chapman	Team transferred to minor league International League
Philadelphia Athletics	Harry Stovey	Lew Simmons
Providence Grays	Frank Bancroft	Team folded
St. Louis Maroons	Alex McKinnon	Gus Schmelz

=== In-season ===
Team	Former Manager	New Manager
New York Metropolitans	Jim Gifford	Bob Ferguson
Philadelphia Athletics	Lew Simmons	Bill Sharsig
Washington Nationals	Michael Scanlon	John Gaffney

== League leaders ==
Any team shown in small text indicates a previous team a player was on during the season.

=== American Association ===
Hitting leaders
Stat	Player	Total
AVG	Guy Hecker (LOU)	.341
OPS	Bob Caruthers (STL)	.974
HR	Bid McPhee (CIN)	8
RBI	Tip O'Neill (STL)	107
R	Arlie Latham (STL)	152
H	Dave Orr (NYM)	193
SB	Harry Stovey (PHA)	68

Pitching leaders
Stat	Player	Total
W	Dave Foutz (STL); Ed Morris (PIT)	41
L	Matt Kilroy (BAL)	34
ERA	Dave Foutz (STL)	2.11
K	Matt Kilroy^{1} (BAL)	513
IP	Toad Ramsey (LOU)	588.2
SV	Bones Ely (LOU); Dave Foutz (STL); Nat Hudson (STL); Ed Morris (PIT); Joe Strauss (BRO/LOU)	1
WHIP	Ed Morris (PIT)	1.032

^{1} All-time single-season strikeouts record

=== National League ===
Hitting leaders
Stat	Player	Total
AVG	King Kelly (CHI)	.388
OPS	Dan Brouthers (DET)	1.026
HR	Dan Brouthers (DET); Hardy Richardson (DET)	11
RBI	Cap Anson (CHI)	147
R	King Kelly (CHI)	155
H	Hardy Richardson (DET)	189
SB	Ed Andrews (PHI)	56

Pitching leaders
Stat	Player	Total
W	Lady Baldwin (DET); Tim Keefe (NYG)	42
L	George Weidman (KC)	36
ERA	Henry Boyle (SLM)	1.76
K	Lady Baldwin (DET)	323
IP	Tim Keefe (NYG)	535.0
SV	Charlie Ferguson (PHI)	2
WHIP	Lady Baldwin (DET)	0.967

== Milestones ==
=== Batters ===
==== Cycles ====
- Fred Dunlap (DET/SLM):
  - Dunlap hit for his first cycle and first in franchise history as a part of the St. Louis Maroons, on May 24 against the New York Gothams.
- Pete Browning (LOU):
  - Browning hit for his first cycle and first in franchise history, on August 8 against the New York Metropolitans.
- Jack Rowe (DET):
  - Rowe hit for his first cycle and third in franchise history, on August 21 against the Chicago White Stockings.
- Chippy McGarr (PHA):
  - McGarr hit for his first cycle and third in franchise history, on September 23 against the St. Louis Browns.

=== Pitchers ===
==== No-hitters ====
- Al Atkinson (PHA):
  - Atkinson threw his second career no-hitter and second no-hitter in franchise history, by defeating the New York Metropolitans 3–2 on May 1. Atkinson walked three and struck out seven.
- Adonis Terry (BRO):
  - Terry threw his first career no-hitter and second no-hitter in franchise history, by defeating the St. Louis Browns 1–0 on July 24. Terry walked two and struck out three.
- Matt Kilroy (BAL):
  - Kilroy threw his first career no-hitter and first no-hitter in franchise history, by defeating the Pittsburgh Alleghenys 6–0 on October 6. Only three Alleghenys reached base.

==== Other pitching accomplishments ====
- Matt Kilroy (BAL):
  - Set the Major League single-season record for most strikeouts, striking out 513.
- Charlie Sweeney (SLM):
  - Sets the Major League single-season record for most allowed home runs in a single game, allowing 7 home runs in a 14–7 loss to the Detroit Wolverines on June 12.

=== Miscellaneous ===
- Pat Dealy (BSN):
  - Set a National League record by allowing 10 passed balls in a single game on May 3.
- Kansas City Cowboys:
  - Set a major league record for most runs scored in the 11th inning, by scoring 10 runs against the Detroit Wolverines on July 21.

== Venues ==
The National League saw two teams join for the 1886 season:

- The Kansas City Cowboys played at League Park in Kansas City, Missouri.
- The Washington Nationals played at Swampoodle Grounds in Washington, D.C.

The 1886 season saw two teams play their final games at their respective ballparks:

- The St. Louis Maroons would play their final game at Union Base Ball Park on September 23 against the Kansas City Cowboys, relocating to Indianapolis, Indiana at Seventh Street Park as the Indianapolis Hooisers for the start of the 1887 season.
- The Philadelphia Quakers would play their final game at Recreation Park in a doubleheader on October 9 against the Detroit Wolverines, moving to Philadelphia Base Ball Grounds for the start of the 1887 season.

The Brooklyn Grays of the American Association begin hosting Sunday games, playing 14 games at Ridgewood Park in Ridgewood, New York on May 2, 16, 23, 30, June 6, 13, 20, July 18, 25, August 1, 22, 29, September 12 and 19.

== See also ==
- 1886 in baseball (Events, Births, Deaths)
