= Jim Gifford =

American baseball manager

- Manager
- Born: October 18, 1845; Warren, New York, U.S.
- Died: December 19, 1901 (aged 56); Columbus, Ohio, U.S.
- Batted: Unknown Threw: Unknown

MLB statistics
- Managerial record: 74–136–2
- Winning %: .354

Teams
- Indianapolis Hoosiers (1884); New York Metropolitans (1885–1886)

James H. Gifford (October 18, 1845 – December 19, 1901) was an American manager in Major League Baseball for three seasons from 1884 to 1886. He managed the 1884 Indianapolis Hoosiers, and the New York Metropolitans from 1885 into the 1886 season. He managed a total of 212, and had a career win–loss record of 74–136. In 1890, he served as treasurer of the St. Louis Browns.

Gifford was a Civil War veteran. His service record indicated that he enlisted as a private in the Union Army on October 8, 1862. He enlisted in Warren, New York, which is the birthplace of the manager. He was assigned to Company K of the 152nd New York Infantry Regiment and served for nearly three years, eventually being promoted to Corporal. He was mustered out in Washington on July 13, 1865. The former manager died in December 1901 in Columbus, Ohio, and his widow Elizabeth filed for a pension on January 16, 1902, citing the name James H. Gifford and his service in Company K of the 152nd New York.

Gifford died in Columbus, Ohio at the age of 56 and is interred in Green Lawn Cemetery in Columbus.
