= Joe Murphy (baseball) =

American baseball player (1866–1951)

- Pitcher
- Born: July 7, 1866; St. Louis, Missouri, U.S.
- Died: March 28, 1951 (aged 84); Coral Gables, Florida, U.S.
- Batted: Unknown Threw: Unknown

MLB debut
- April 28, 1886, for the Cincinnati Red Stockings

Last MLB appearance
- August 19, 1887, for the St. Louis Browns

MLB statistics
- Win–loss record: 4–7
- Strikeouts: 30
- Earned run average: 5.97
- Stats at Baseball Reference

Teams
- Cincinnati Red Stockings (1886); St. Louis Maroons (1886); St. Louis Browns (1886–1887)

Joseph Akin Murphy (July 7, 1866 – March 28, 1951) was an American pitcher for Major League Baseball in the 19th century. He played collegiate ball at Saint Louis University and played professionally for the Cincinnati Red Stockings, St. Louis Maroons and St. Louis Browns.

== Sources ==
- Career statistics from Baseball Reference · Retrosheet · Baseball Almanac
