= Ed Greer =

American baseball player (1863–1890)

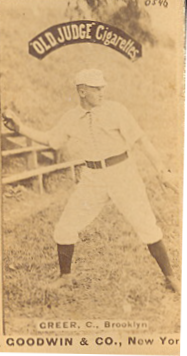
- 1888 baseball card of Greer
- Outfielder
- Born: July 29, 1863; Philadelphia, Pennsylvania
- Died: February 14, 1890 (aged 26); Philadelphia, Pennsylvania
- Batted: Right Threw: Right

MLB debut
- June 24, 1885, for the Baltimore Orioles

Last MLB appearance
- October 10, 1887, for the Brooklyn Grays

MLB statistics
- Batting average: .215
- Home runs: 3
- Runs batted in: 93
- Stats at Baseball Reference

Teams
- Baltimore Orioles (1885–1886); Philadelphia Athletics (1886–1887); Brooklyn Grays (1887)

Edward Greer (July 29, 1863 – February 14, 1890) was an American outfielder in Major League Baseball. He played for the Baltimore Orioles, Philadelphia Athletics, and Brooklyn Grays from 1885 to 1887.
