= Joe Strauss =

American baseball player (1858–1906)

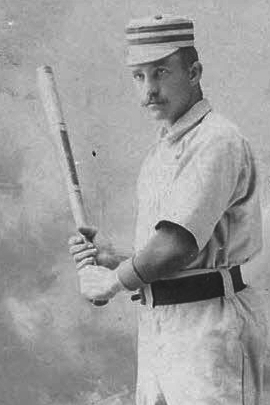
- Outfielder
- Born: November 16, 1858; Cincinnati, Ohio, U.S.
- Died: June 24, 1906 (aged 47); Cincinnati, Ohio, U.S.
- Batted: Right Threw: Right

MLB debut
- July 24, 1884, for the Kansas City Cowboys

Last MLB appearance
- October 6, 1886, for the Brooklyn Grays

MLB statistics
- Batting average: .216
- Hits: 86
- Runs scored: 46
- Stats at Baseball Reference

Teams
- Kansas City Cowboys (1884); Louisville Colonels (1885–1886); Brooklyn Grays (1886)

Joseph Strauss (November 16, 1858 – June 24, 1906) was an American professional baseball outfielder in Major League Baseball from 1884 to 1886. He played for the Kansas City Cowboys, Brooklyn Grays, and Louisville Colonels.

== See also ==
- List of Major League Baseball annual saves leaders
