= 1886 in baseball =

The following are the baseball events of the year 1886 throughout the world.

== Champions ==
=== Major League Baseball ===
- National League: Chicago White Stockings
- American Association: St. Louis Browns

World Series

- St. Louis Browns 4, Chicago White Stockings 2

=== Minor League Baseball ===
- Eastern League: Newark
- International League: Utica
- New England League: Portland
- Northwestern League: Duluth
- Western League: Denver

=== College baseball ===
- Inter-Collegiate Association: Yale University

== Statistical leaders ==
	American Association		National League	
Stat	Player	Total	Player	Total
AVG	Guy Hecker (LOU)	.341	King Kelly (CHI)	.388
HR	Bid McPhee (CIN)	8	Dan Brouthers (DET); Hardy Richardson (DET)	11
RBI	Tip O'Neill (STL)	107	Cap Anson (CHI)	147
W	Dave Foutz (STL); Ed Morris (PIT)	41	Lady Baldwin (DET); Tim Keefe (NYG)	42
ERA	Dave Foutz (STL)	2.11	Henry Boyle (SLM)	1.76
K	Matt Kilroy^{1} (BAL)	513	Lady Baldwin (DET)	323

^{1} All-time single-season strikeouts record

== All-Time Statistical Leaders (Strikeouts) ==
The 1886 season was memorable as the top two all-time Major League Baseball single season strikeout totals were established that year:

Pitcher	Strikeouts	Season	Team	League	Overall Rank
Matt Kilroy	513	1886	Baltimore Orioles	AA	1
Toad Ramsey	499	1886	Louisville Colonels	AA	2

== Major league baseball final standings ==
=== American Association final standings ===
American Association
Team	W	L	Pct.	GB	Home	Road
St. Louis Browns	93	46	.669	—	52‍–‍18	41‍–‍28
Pittsburgh Alleghenys	80	57	.584	12	45‍–‍28	35‍–‍29
Brooklyn Grays	76	61	.555	16	44‍–‍25	32‍–‍36
Louisville Colonels	66	70	.485	25½	37‍–‍30	29‍–‍40
Cincinnati Red Stockings	65	73	.471	27½	40‍–‍31	25‍–‍42
Philadelphia Athletics	63	72	.467	28	38‍–‍31	25‍–‍41
New York Metropolitans	53	82	.393	38	30‍–‍33	23‍–‍49
Baltimore Orioles	48	83	.366	41	30‍–‍32	18‍–‍51

Locations of teams for the 1886 American Association season
American Association

=== National League final standings ===
National League
Team	W	L	Pct.	GB	Home	Road
Chicago White Stockings	90	34	.726	—	52‍–‍10	38‍–‍24
Detroit Wolverines	87	36	.707	2½	49‍–‍13	38‍–‍23
New York Giants	75	44	.630	12½	47‍–‍12	28‍–‍32
Philadelphia Quakers	71	43	.623	14	45‍–‍14	26‍–‍29
Boston Beaneaters	56	61	.479	30½	32‍–‍26	24‍–‍35
St. Louis Maroons	43	79	.352	46	27‍–‍34	16‍–‍45
Kansas City Cowboys	30	91	.248	58½	17‍–‍40	13‍–‍51
Washington Nationals	28	92	.233	60	19‍–‍43	9‍–‍49

Locations of teams for the 1886 National League season
National League

== Notable seasons ==
- Guy Hecker of the Louisville Colonels not only compiled a 26–23 record with a 2.87 Earned Run Average as the Colonels number 2 pitcher, he also won the American Association batting crown with a .341 average. Hecker remains the only pitcher to ever win a batting title.
- Matt Kilroy of the Baltimore Orioles throws 4 2-hitters, 3 1-hitters and a no-hitter in his rookie season in 1886. Kilroy also sets the single season major league record with 513 strikeouts.
- Jocko Flynn of the Chicago White Stockings goes 23–6 in his rookie season in 1886. Flynn develops arm trouble and never pitches again in the major leagues. His 23 wins are still a record for a pitcher who only pitched in 1 season.

== Events ==
=== January–March ===
- January 4 – St. Louis Browns owner Chris von der Ahe sells the reserve rights of Sam Barkley to the Pittsburgh Alleghenys for $1,000. von der Ahe had previously sold the rights to the Baltimore Orioles on December 24, 1885 but had not received payment from Baltimore. Barkley, in the interim, had already signed a contract with Baltimore. The resulting power struggle within the American Association to resolve the situation would lead to the ouster of league president, Denny McKnight.
- January 16 – The Washington Nationals are admitted to the National League.
- February 5 – The lawsuit brought by Fred Thayer and George Wright against Albert Spalding and his Spalding sporting goods company for infringement upon Thayer's patent rights to the catching mask goes to trial. Spalding will be forced to pay royalties to Thayer and Wright when the case is settled.
- February 9 – The Kansas City Cowboys are admitted to the National League for a one-year trial. This brings the NL back to 8 teams for 1886.
- February 27 – The Cincinnati Red Stockings of the American Association is sold by Aaron Stern to Louis Huack, a wealthy brewer and banker.
- March 2
  - The American Association meets, overruling its own president Denny McKnight, and suspends Sam Barkley for signing with the Pittsburgh Alleghenys after he had already signed with the Baltimore Orioles.
  - The American Association reduces the number of balls needed for a walk to six and adopts the stolen base as an official statistic.
- March 4 – The National League makes the stolen base an official statistic as well but keeps the number of balls for a walk at seven.
- March 5 – In breaking from official league policy, the National League allows the St. Louis Maroons and the Philadelphia Quakers to drop their ticket prices to 25¢. The removal of the 50¢ requirement for those teams is due to competing teams from the American Association in their respective cities.
- March 17 – The Sporting News, founded by Alfred H. Spink, publishes its first issue. It will quickly become the leading source of baseball information in the country.
- March 22 – The American Association removes Denny McKnight as president due to his handling of the Sam Barkley incident. Wheeler Wikoff is selected as his replacement.

=== April–June ===
- April 13 – The American Association resolves the Sam Barkley case by allowing Barkley to play for the Pittsburgh Alleghenys and sending Milt Scott from Pittsburgh to the Baltimore Orioles as compensation for losing Barkley. Additionally, the St. Louis Browns are allowed to keep the $1,000 they received from Pittsburgh for Barkley's reserve rights.
- April 16 – The final exhibition games between various National League and American Association teams are played with the AA holding a 19–16 advantage over the NL in the games played.
- April 19 – Wilbert Robinson makes his major league debut with the Philadelphia Athletics of the American Association. Robinson will remain in the majors as a player, coach or manager through 1931.
- April 22 – The New York Metropolitans open their new 5,000-seat stadium, the St. George Cricket Grounds. The new park boasts illuminated fountains, with an amusement park and restaurants next to it.
- April 29 – The New York World prints woodcuts of live action photographs taken during a game.
- April 30 – The first National League game is played in Kansas City, Missouri. The Cowboys lose to the Chicago White Stockings 6–5 in 13 innings as the game is "broadcast" in Chicago by using a baseball stadium diagram and player transparencies.
- May 1 – Al Atkinson throws a no-hitter for the Philadelphia Athletics of the American Association. It is the 2nd no-hitter in Atkinson's career.
- May 2 – The game between the Brooklyn Grays and the Philadelphia Athletics is called as a 19–19 tie after eight innings due to darkness.
- May 3 – Pat Dealy of the Boston Beaneaters sets a National League record by allowing 10 passed balls, while pitcher Bill Stemmeyer throws 5 wild pitches in a 12–11 loss.
- May 17 – Jim Gifford is fired as manager of the American Association New York Metropolitans and is replaced by AA umpire Bob Ferguson.
- May 24 – St. Louis Maroons second baseman Fred Dunlap hits for the cycle in an 11–8 loss to the New York Giants.
- May 31 – The first crowd in major league history of over 20,000 (20,632) watches the Detroit Wolverines win 4–1 against the New York Giants at the Polo Grounds.
- June 3 – St. Louis Browns teammates Arlie Latham and Doc Bushong are each fined $100 for a fist fight between the two during a Brown's game in Baltimore.
- June 4 – Tony Mullane of the Cincinnati Red Stockings gives more ammunition to those suspicious of him throwing games when he gives up 12 runs in the last 2 innings after 7 shutout innings in a 12–7 loss to the Brooklyn Grays.
- June 12 – Charlie Sweeney of the St. Louis Maroons sets the major league record by allowing 7 home runs in 1 game in a 14–7 loss to the Detroit Wolverines.
- June 18 – The Cincinnati Enquirer publishes a letter it has received accusing Tony Mullane of throwing games on the Red Stockings previous road trip. When the writer fails to produce evidence after being challenged, Mullane is exonerated by the team.
- June 26 – George Stovey makes his professional league debut in the Eastern League with the Jersey City Jerseys.

=== July–September ===
- July 5
  - Fred Carroll of the Pittsburgh Alleghenys sets a major league record with 9 hits in a doubleheader.
  - The Louisville Colonels suspend Pete Browning for a month due to Browning playing in games while drunk.
- July 8 – Jumbo McGinnis of the St. Louis Browns, making only his 10th start of the season, shuts out the Baltimore Orioles 10–0. Hours later, McGinnis is sold to the Orioles.
- July 9 – Joe Start, one of baseball's original stars, plays in the final game of his career. The 43-year-old veteran played in the original season of the National Association in 1871, although his playing days as an amateur started before the American Civil War.
- July 24 – Adonis Terry of the Brooklyn Grays pitches a no-hitter against the St. Louis Browns.
- July 27 – The Brotherhood of Professional Base-Ball Players, led by John Montgomery Ward, publicly announces its existence. The Brotherhood boasts chapters in virtually every major league city. This group will be behind the formation of the Players' League in 1890.
- July 29 – Tom Ramsey of the Louisville Colonels throws a 1-hitter against the Baltimore Orioles, allowing only a supposed single to Pat O'Connell leading off the first inning. Curiously, though The Baltimore Sun and Louisville Courier both report the game as a no-hitter, Ramsey is officially credited with a 1-hitter.
- July 31 – Tom Ramsey of the Louisville Colonels pitches his 2nd consecutive 1-hitter, striking out 16 in a 2–1 win over the Baltimore Orioles. It also marks the 3rd time in 4 games that the Colonels have 1-hit the Orioles as Dave Foutz had also thrown a 1-hitter against them on July 28.
- August 8
  - The St. Louis Maroons sell second baseman Fred Dunlap to the Detroit Wolverines for $4,700, prompting rumors that the Maroons are about to disband.
  - Louisville Colonels outfielder Pete Browning hits for the cycle in an 11–6 win over the New York Metropolitans.
- August 14 – John Clarkson of the Chicago White Stockings beats the St. Louis Maroons for the 17th consecutive game, a record which still stands.
- August 15 – Guy Hecker of the Louisville Colonels pitches a 4-hitter in a 22–5 win over the Baltimore Orioles. More impressively, Hecker gets 6 hits and scores 7 runs in the game which sets a major league record. 3 of Heckers hits are inside the park home runs, another major league record that will be tied in 1897. In addition, it gives Hecker 17 hits in his last 4 games, another major league record that has since been tied. Hecker's 15 total bases for the game also set a record that will be broken in 1894.
- August 16 – One day after pitcher Guy Hecker's hitting exhibition, St. Louis Brown hurler Bob Caruthers provides his own offensive fireworks by becoming the first pitcher to have 4 extra-base hits in one game by smacking a double, triple and 2 home runs in a game he loses 11–9 after allowing 10 runs in the 8th inning. Caruthers will not only go on to win 30 games in 1886, he will also lead the American Association in slugging percentage and on-base percentage.
- August 20 – Matt Kilroy of the Baltimore Orioles defeats Cyclone Miller of the Philadelphia Athletics 1–0 in a game in which both pitchers had a 1-hitter.
- August 21 – Jack Rowe of the Detroit Wolverines hits for the cycle in an 8–6 win over the Kansas City Cowboys.
- September 10 – Dan Brouthers smacks 3 home runs to go along with a single and double and ties the record for 15 total bases in 1 game. Despite Brouthers' heroics, his 2nd place Detroit Wolverines lose to the league leading Chicago White Stockings 14–8.
- September 11 – Connie Mack makes his major league debut with the Washington Nationals.
- September 15 – The St. Louis Browns clinch their 2nd consecutive pennant in the American Association with a 4–3 victory over the Brooklyn Grays.
- September 23
  - Pud Galvin walks all 3 batters he faces in one inning in a game against the Brooklyn Grays. Galvin escapes the potential jam by picking all 3 runners off of first base in succession.
  - Third baseman Chippy McGarr of the Philadelphia Athletics hits for the cycle in a 15–6 win over the St. Louis Browns.
- September 24 – Looking to possibly jump from the American Association to the National League, the Pittsburgh Alleghenys play an exhibition game against the Chicago White Stockings and defeat them 10–3.
- September 25 – St. Louis Browns owner Chris von der Ahe challenges Albert Spalding and his Chicago White Stockings to a post-season series.
- September 30 – The Chicago White Stockings accept the challenge issued by the St. Louis Browns to play a World Championship Series. The teams agree on a best-of-7 game format with the winner taking the entire gate money from the series.

=== October–December ===
- October 6 – Matt Kilroy of the Baltimore Orioles pitches a no-hitter against the Pittsburgh Alleghenys.
- October 8 – Lady Baldwin of the Detroit Wolverines wins his 42nd game of the season, a National League record which still stands for a left-handed pitcher.
- October 9 – The Chicago White Stockings clinch the National League pennant by beating the Boston Beaneaters 12–3.
- October 18 – The Chicago White Stockings win game 1 of the World Championship Series with a 6–0 win over the St. Louis Browns.
- October 19 – The St. Louis Browns even the series with a 12–0 romp over the Chicago White Stockings. Bob Caruthers pitches a 1-hitter in the win and Tip O'Neill becomes the first player to hit 2 home runs in a post-season game.
- October 20 – The White Stockings beat the Browns 11–4 to take a 2–1 advantage in the series.
- October 21 – The Browns tie the series at 2–2 with an 8–5 win over the White Stockings.
- October 22 – With Jim McCormick and Jocko Flynn hurt and John Clarkson tired, the White Stockings are forced to use position players to pitch and the Browns take full advantage, winning easily 10–3 to take a 3–2 lead in the series.
- October 23 – The St. Louis Browns win the World Championship Series with a 4–3 win over the Chicago White Stockings. Chicago pitcher John Clarkson, pitching his 4th game in 6 days, holds St. Louis hitless for 6 innings as Chicago takes a 3–0 lead. The Browns tie the game with 3 runs in the 8th inning and win it in the bottom of the 10th when Curt Welch scores on a wild pitch in what became known as "the $15,000 slide". The Browns win the entire gate receipts from the series which total $13,920, with each St. Louis player receiving roughly $580 for the championship.
- November 12 – The first trade ever of two reserve players takes place as the St. Louis Browns send Hugh Nicol and cash to the Cincinnati Red Stockings for Jack Boyle.
- November 16 – The joint rules committee between the National League and the American Association announce the new rules for the 1887 season which include 5 balls for a walk, 4 strikes for an out, the batter calling for pitch location being abolished and establishing a strike zone between the knees and shoulders of the batter. The pitcher can now only take 1 forward step in his pitching delivery and by changing the dimensions of the pitcher's box, the pitching distance is now at 55½ feet.
- November 18 – The National League officially admits the Pittsburgh Alleghenys who jump from the American Association. The Alleghenys made a reported profit of $160,000 in 1886 and finished 2nd in the AA, making the decision a fairly easy one for the NL.
- November 22 – The American Association admits the Cleveland Blues to take the place of the Pittsburgh Alleghenys, who had jumped to the National League.
- November 26 – Albert Spalding of the National League champion Chicago White Stockings sells his 2nd starter within a week in his attempt to rid the team of players who drink alcohol.
- December 15 – The American Association adopts a rule that allows a club to reserve a player for as long it wishes, rather than for just one year as had previously been the case.

== Births ==
- January 26 – Hick Cady
- March 6 – Bill Sweeney
- March 13 – Frank Baker
- April 6 – Smokey Joe Williams
- April 7 – Ed Lafitte
- April 23 – Harry Coveleski
- May 2 – Larry Cheney
- May 13 – Larry Gardner
- May 13 – Frank Miller
- May 24 – Hi Jasper
- June 10 – Jack Graney
- July 26 – Roy Witherup
- July 31 – Larry Doyle
- August 7 – Bill McKechnie
- September 9 – Dots Miller
- September 20 – Eustaquio Pedroso
- October 9 – Rube Marquard
- October 5 – Bill Steele
- October 6 – Scotty Barr
- October 23 – Lena Blackburne
- October 26 – Swede Carlstrom
- November 9 – Nick Maddox
- November 17 – Fred Beck
- December 11 – Joe Riggert
- December 18 – Ty Cobb
- December 19 – Doc McMahon
- December 25 – Morrie Rath

== Deaths ==
- January 30 – Jim Hall, age unknown, played 2nd base for the 1872 Brooklyn Atlantics.
- February 13 – Fred Warner, 30?, utility man who played for 6 different teams from 1875 to 1884.
- March 4 – Tom Lee, 23, pitcher in 1884 in both the National League and Union Association.
- May 21 – David Lenz, 35, played 4 games in 1872 for the Brooklyn Eckfords.
- June 4 – Jim Ward, 31, played in 1 game for the Philadelphia Athletics in 1884, catching and going 2–4 at the plate.
- June 27 – George Creamer, 30?, second baseman for four teams who led league in fielding with Pittsburgh in his final 1884 season.
- July 11 – Denny Driscoll, 30, pitcher for the Pittsburgh Alleghenys in 1882–1883 and led the American Association with a 1.21 Earned Run Average in 1882.
- August 9 – Bill Smith, 26, played in 1 game for the Cleveland Blues in 1884.
- August 20 – Dick Blaisdell, 24, pitched three games in 1884 for the Kansas City Cowboys in the Union Association.
- September 22 – Tom Oran, 39?, outfielder for the short-lived St. Louis Red Stockings in 1875.
- October 30 – Bernie Graham, 26?, outfielder for the Baltimore Monumentals of the Union Association in 1884.
