= List of St. Louis Cardinals team records =

The St. Louis Cardinals, a professional baseball franchise based in St. Louis, Missouri, compete in the National League (NL) of Major League Baseball (MLB) since 1892. Before joining the NL, they were also a charter member of the American Association (AA) from 1882 to 1891. Although St. Louis has been the Cardinals' home city for the franchise's entire existence, they were also known as the Brown Stockings, Browns, and Perfectos.

In 140 seasons, the franchise has won more than 11,000 regular season games and appeared in 31 postseasons while claiming 12 interleague championships, tying one other, and 23 league pennants. 11 of the interleague championships are World Series titles won under the modern format since 1903; the other championship and tie occurred in 1885–1886. 19 of the league pennants are NL pennants, and the other four are AA pennants. Their 11 World Series titles represent the most in the NL and are second in MLB only to the New York Yankees' 27.

Notable players have defined, in part, the Cardinals' success and history. Stan Musial owns the most career batting records with 22. Rogers Hornsby owns the most single-season records with 11. Bob Gibson owns the most career pitching records with 18. Silver King owns the most single-season pitching records with nine.

== All-time record-holders ==
Record-holders of the St. Louis Cardinals franchise
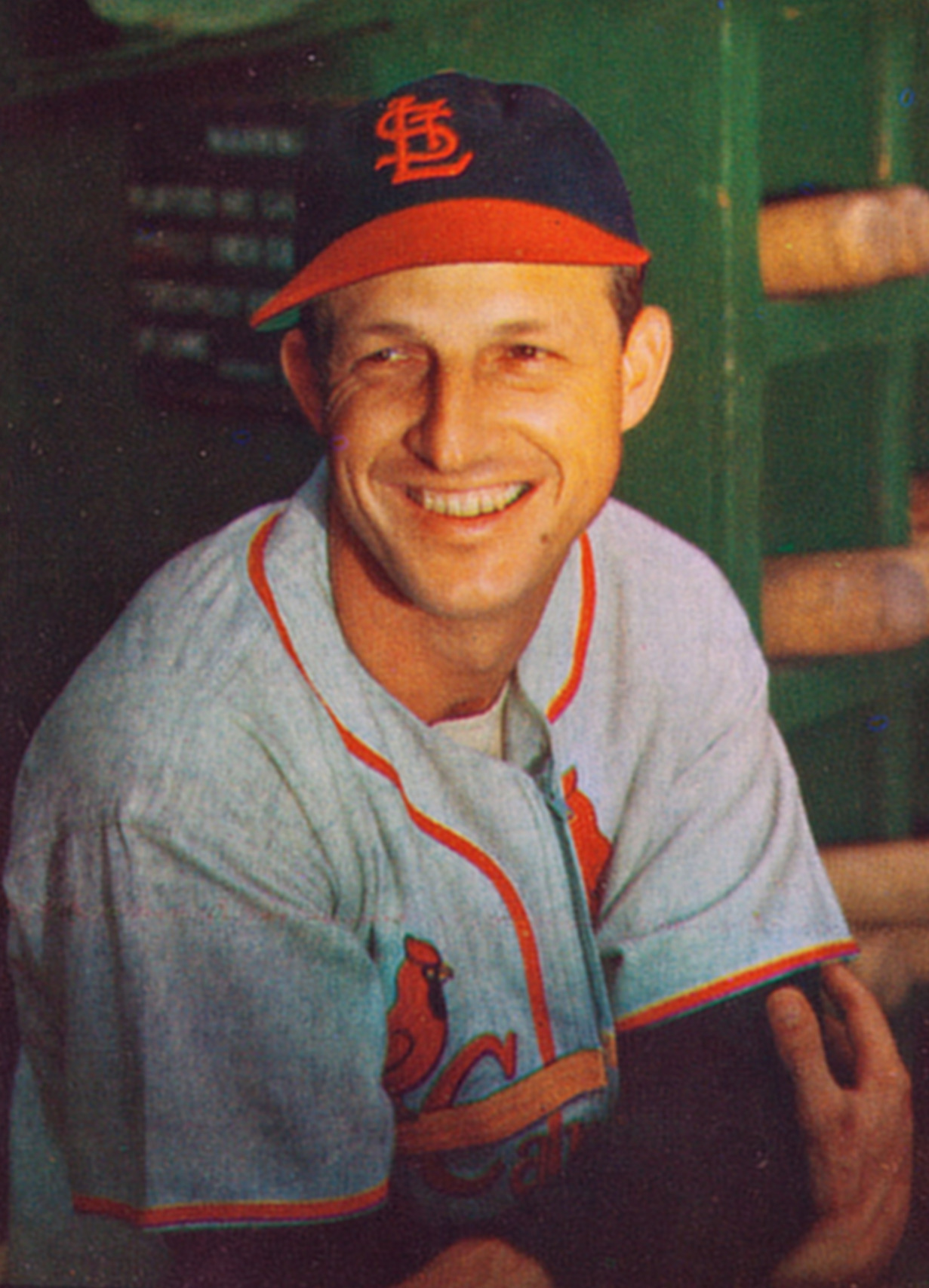
Stan Musial, with St. Louis Cardinals 1941–44 and 1946–63

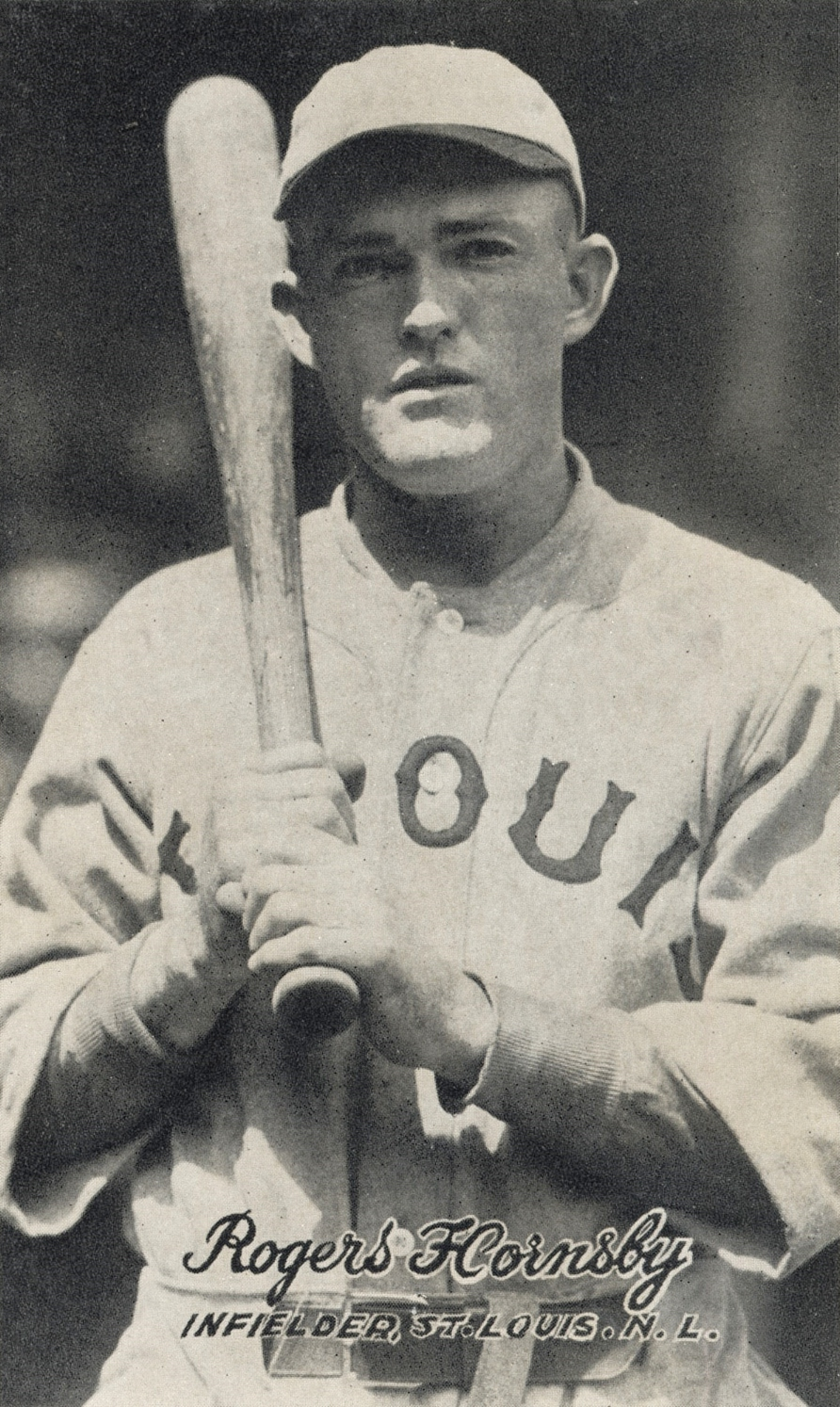
Rogers Hornsby, with St. Louis Cardinals 1915–26 and 1933

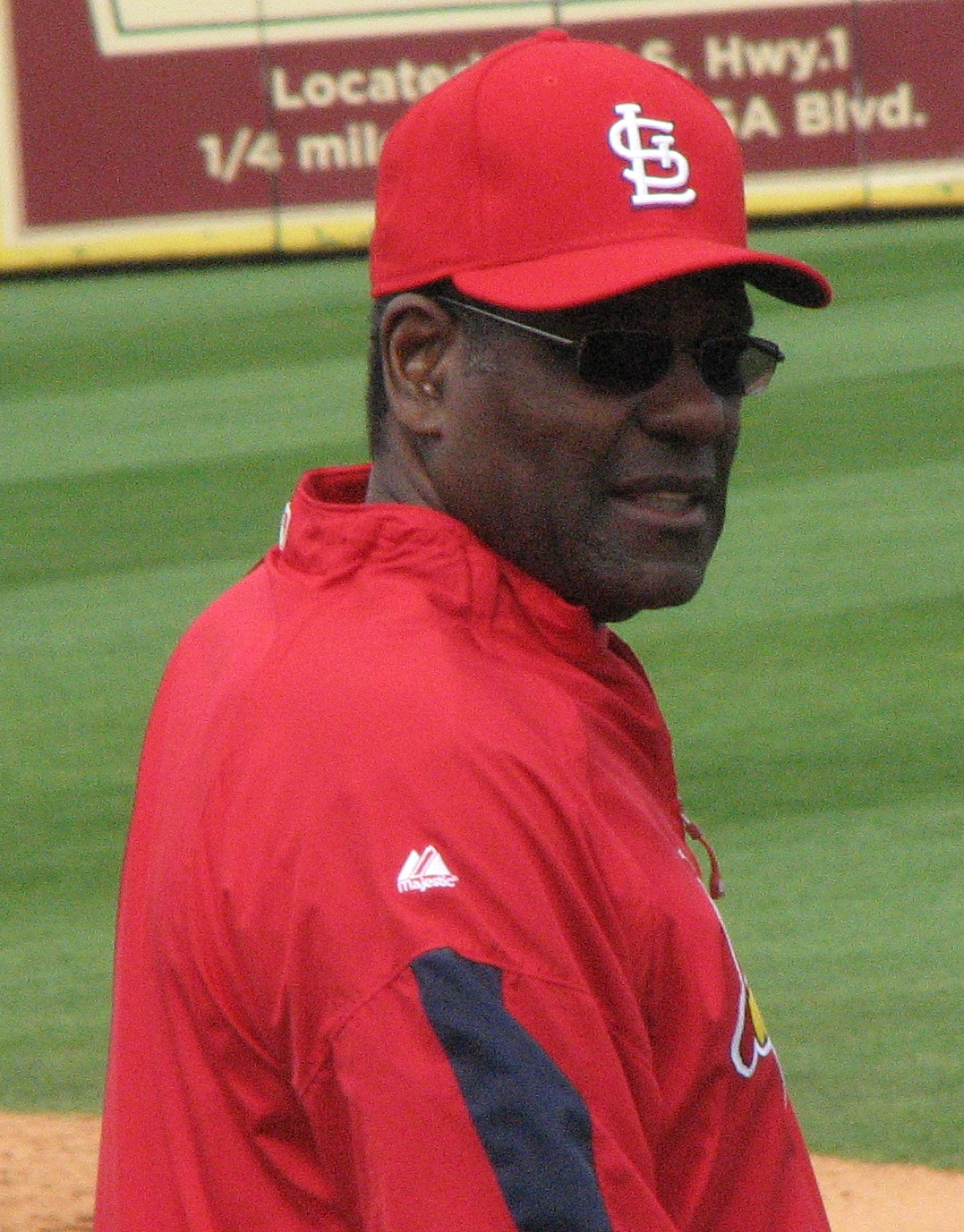
Bob Gibson, with St. Louis Cardinals 1959–75

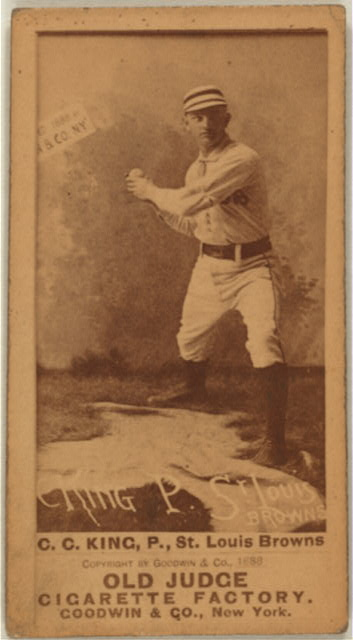
Silver King, with St. Louis Browns 1887–89

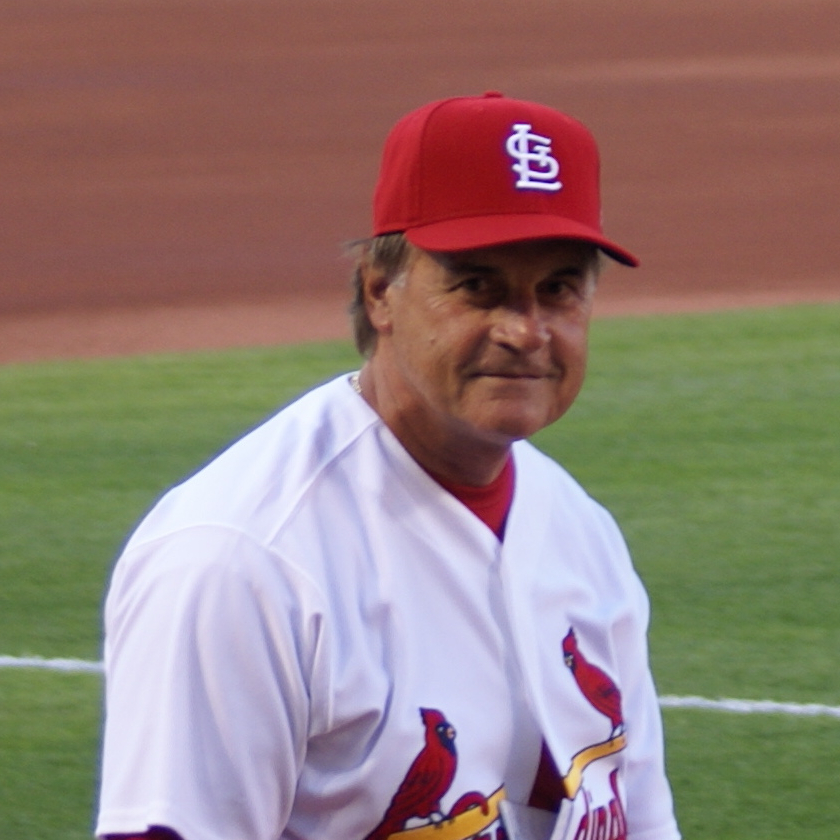
Tony La Russa managed the Cardinals from 1996–2011.

== Table notes and keys ==
All statistics:

As of end of 2024 season

Bold denotes still active with the team.

Italic denotes still active but not with the team.

== Team records ==
=== Single-game ===
All-time team single-game batting records
Category	Record	2nd place	3rd place	4th place	5th place	Ref
Runs	**28** vs. PHI (July 6, 1929)	23 vs. PHI (September 16, 1926)	22 vs. BKN (July 27, 1918)	21 vs. NYG (August 2, 1948), vs. CHC (April 27, 1977)		
Hits	**28** vs. PHI (July 6, 1929)	26 vs. BKN (July 27, 1918), vs. PHI (September 23, 1930), vs. PHI (August 9, 1932), vs. ATL (August 22, 2008)				
Home runs	**7** vs. BKN (May 7, 1940), vs. CHC (July 12, 1996)		6 vs. NYM (July 8, 1962), vs. MIL (April 9, 2000), vs. CHC (August 18, 2006), vs. PHI (July 15, 2007), vs. CIN (April 15, 2016)			

Italics – occurred in extra innings

All-time team single-game pitching records
Category	Record	2nd place	3rd place	4th place	5th place	Ref
Strikeouts	**19** vs. NYM (9.0 IP, September 15, 1969), vs. PIT (19.0 IP, August 19, 2012)		18 vs. CHC (14.1 IP, September 2, 2003)	17 vs. CHC (9.0 IP, July 30, 1933), vs. PHI (8.1 IP, May 21, 1970), vs. HOU (14.0 IP, June 22, 1999), vs. COL (14.1 IP, September 19, 2013)		

=== Single-season ===
All-time overall team single-season records
Category	Record	2nd place	3rd place	4th place	5th place	Ref
Winning percentage	**.705** (1885)	.704 (1887)	.688 (1942)	.682 (1943, 1944)		
Games won	**106** (1942)	105 (1943, 1944, 2004)			101 (1931, 1967, 1985)	
Games lost	**111** (1898)	105 (1908)	102 (1897)	101 (1907)	99 (1913)	
Fan attendance	**3,552,180** (2007)	3,540,649 (2014)	3,538,988 (2005)	3,520,889 (2015)	3,480,393 (2019)	

Attendance milestones:
- First season the Cardinals reached 3.5 million: 2005
- First season the Cardinals reached 3 million: 1987
- First season the Cardinals reached 2.5 million: 1985
- First season the Cardinals reached 2 million: 1967
- First season the Cardinals reached 1.5 million: 1966
- First season the Cardinals reached 1 million: 1946
- First season the Cardinals reached 500,000: 1922

All-time team single-season batting records
Category	Record	2nd place	3rd place	4th place	5th place	Ref
Runs	**1131** (1887)	1004 (1930)	976 (1891)	957 (1889)	944 (1886)	
Hits	**1732** (1930)	1635 (1921)	1634 (1922)	1601 (1939)	1594 (1979)	
Doubles	**373** (1930)	353 (1931)	342 (2003)	332 (1936, 1939)		
Triples	**113** (1894)	98 (1893)	96 (1920)	94 (1901)	93 (1917)	
Home runs	**235** (2000)	225 (2016)	223 (1998)	214 (2004)	210 (2019)	
Runs batted in	**942** (1930)	862 (1887)	841 (2000)	827 (2003)	817 (2004)	
Stolen bases	**581** (1887)	468 (1888)	336 (1886, 1889)		314 (1985)	
Caught stealing (most)	**184** (1913)	144 (1915)	118 (1992)	114 (1920)	112 (1977)	
Caught stealing (least, 162-game season)	**22** (2013, 2021)		25 (2022)	26 (2016)	29 (2019, 2023, 2024)	
Bases on balls	**676** (1998)	675 (2000)	655 (1910)	644 (1987)	613 (1999)	
Strikeouts	**1420** (2019)	1380 (2018)	1348 (2017)	1341 (2021)	1326 (2023)	
Batting average	**.314** (1930)	.308 (1921)	.307 (1887)	.301 (1922)	.299 (1925)	
On-base percentage	**.372** (1930)	.371 (1887)	.358 (1921)	.357 (1922)	.356 (1891, 1900, 1925, 2000)	
Slugging percentage	**.471** (1930)	.460 (2004)	.455 (2000)	.454 (2003)	.445 (1925)	
On-base plus slugging	**.843** (1930)	.812 (2000)	.804 (2003, 2004)		.802 (1922)	

All-time team single-season pitching records
Category	Record	2nd place	3rd place	4th place	5th place	Ref
ERA	**2.09** (1888)	2.23 (1883)	2.38 (1914)	2.44 (1885)	2.49 (1886, 1968)	
Runs allowed per game	**2.91** (1968)	3.03 (1943)	3.08 (1942)	3.12 (1944)	3.24 (2015)	
Complete games	**146** (1904)	139 (1892)	135 (1905)	134 (1886, 1899)		
Shutouts	**30** (1968)	26 (1944)	23 (2014)	21 (1943)	20 (1985)	
Saves	**62** (2015)	57 (2004)	55 (2014, 2024)		54 (1993)	
Hits allowed (most)	**1610** (1936)	1609 (1922)	1604 (1929)	1594 (1897, 1930)		
Hits allowed (least, 162-game season)	**1234** (2021)	1282 (1968)	1284 (2019)	1289 (1969)	1300 (1978)	
Runs allowed (most)	**1088** (1897)	1036 (1895)	953 (1894)	929 (1896, 1898)		
Runs allowed (least, 162-game season)	**472** (1968)	525 (2015)	540 (1969)	557 (1967)	572 (1985)	
Earned runs allowed (most)	**779** (1897)	761 (1999)	760 (2023)	748 (2003)	741 (2007)	
Earned runs allowed (least, 162-game season)	**409** (1968)	477 (1969)	478 (2015)	496 (1967)	505 (1966, 1985)	
Home runs allowed (most)	**210** (2003)	196 (2000, 2001)		193 (2006)	191 (2019)	
Home runs allowed (least, 162-game season)	**82** (1968)	84 (1989)	90 (1980)	91 (1976, 1988)		
Bases on balls allowed (most)	**701** (1911)	667 (1999)	632 (1970)	616 (1974)	608 (2021)	
Bases on balls allowed (least, 162-game season)	**375** (1968)	383 (1993)	400 (1992)	410 (1964)	431 (1967)	
Strikeouts	**1399** (2019)	1351 (2017)	1337 (2018)	1329 (2015)	1308 (2024)	
WHIP	**0.960** (1888)	1.000 (1883)	1.045 (1885)	1.067 (1884)	1.120 (1968)	
Strikeouts per nine innings pitched	**8.83** (2020)	8.72 (2019)	8.38 (2017)	8.27 (2018)	8.17 (2015)	
Home runs per nine innings pitched	**0.07** (1883)	0.09 (1882)	0.10 (1886)	0.11 (1885, 1906, 1908)		

All-time team single-season fielding records
Category	Record	2nd place	3rd place	4th place	5th place	Ref
Errors (most)	**494** (1886)	490 (1884)	481 (1887)	478 (1890)	459 (1891)	
Errors (least, 162-game season)	**66** (2019, 2022)		67 (2023)	75 (2013, 2024)		
Double plays	**196** (2005)	192 (1974)	187 (1951)	184 (1984)	183 (1943)	
Fielding percentage	**.989** (2019, 2023, 2023)			.988 (2013)	.987 (2003, 2024)	

== Managers ==
All-time team managerial records
Category	Record	2nd place	3rd place	4th place	5th place	Ref
Seasons managed	**16** Tony La Russa	14 Red Schoendienst	11 Whitey Herzog	8 Charles Comiskey	7 Mike Matheny, Branch Rickey, Billy Southworth	
Winning percentage (Min. 3 complete seasons)	**.673** Charles Comiskey	.642 Billy Southworth	.578 Eddie Dyer	.564 Frankie Frisch	.563 Gabby Street	
Games won	**1408** Tony La Russa	1041 Red Schoendienst	822 Whitey Herzog	680 Billy Southworth	591 Mike Matheny	
Games lost	**1182** Tony La Russa	955 Red Schoendienst	728 Whitey Herzog	485 Branch Rickey	474 Mike Matheny	
World Series titles	**2** Tony La Russa, Billy Southworth		1 Eddie Dyer, Frankie Frisch, Whitey Herzog, Rogers Hornsby, Johnny Keane, Red Schoendienst, Gabby Street			
Pennants won	**4** Charles Comiskey	3 Whitey Herzog, Tony La Russa, Billy Southworth			2 Red Schoendienst, Gabby Street	

== All-time career individual records ==
=== Batting ===
Top career batting leaders
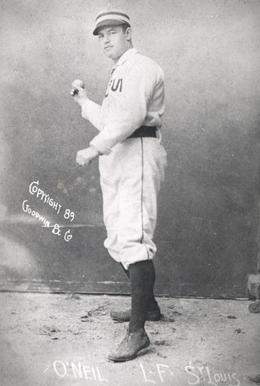
Tip O'Neill won the first batting Triple Crown in franchise history in 1887.

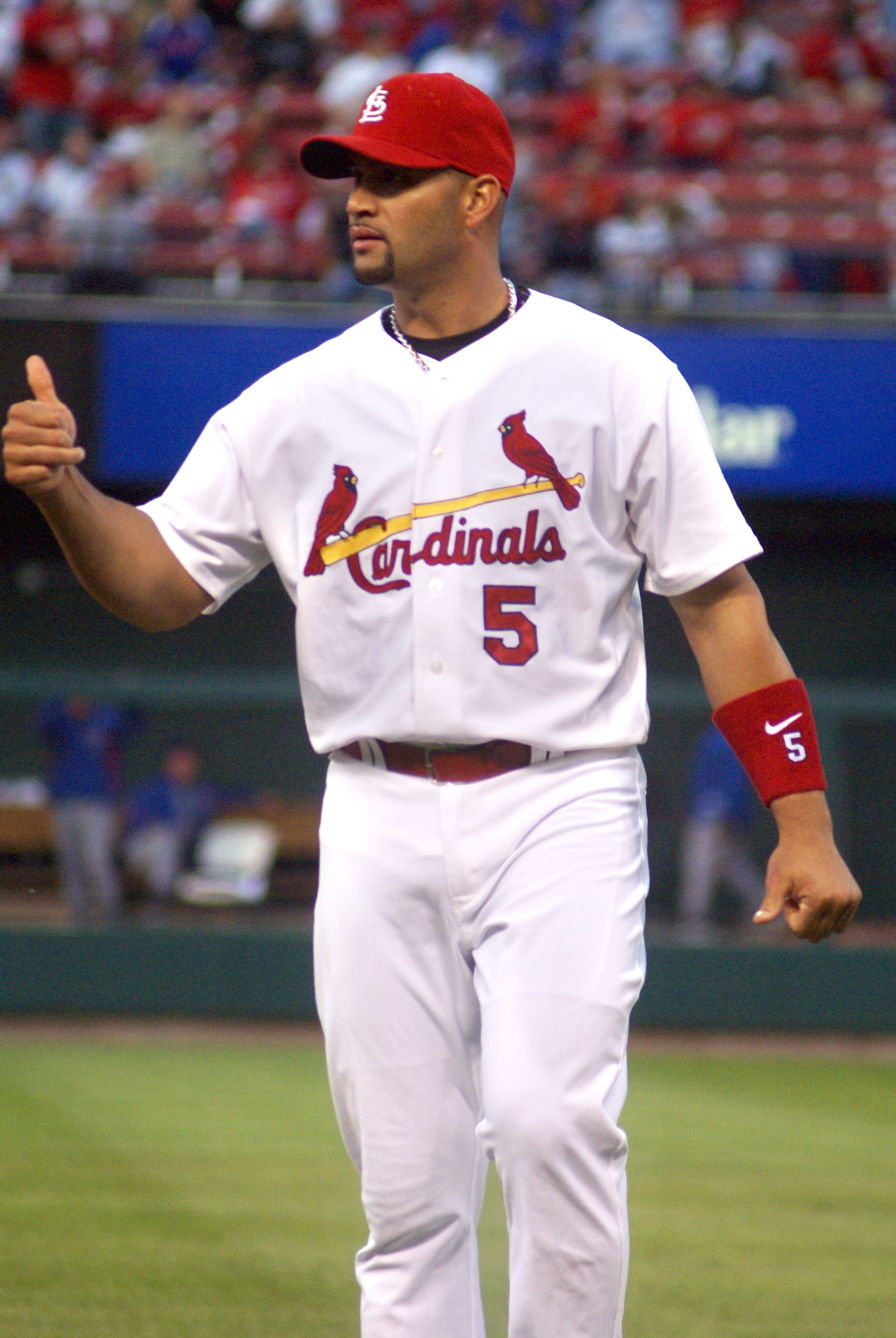
Albert Pujols batted .326 with 469 home runs in 12 seasons as a Cardinal.

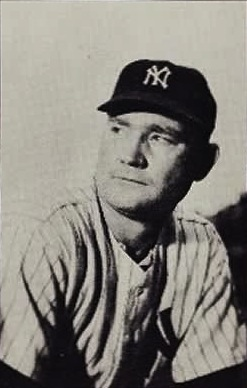
Johnny Mize won the 1939 batting title and hit .336 with a .600 slugging percentage as a Cardinal.

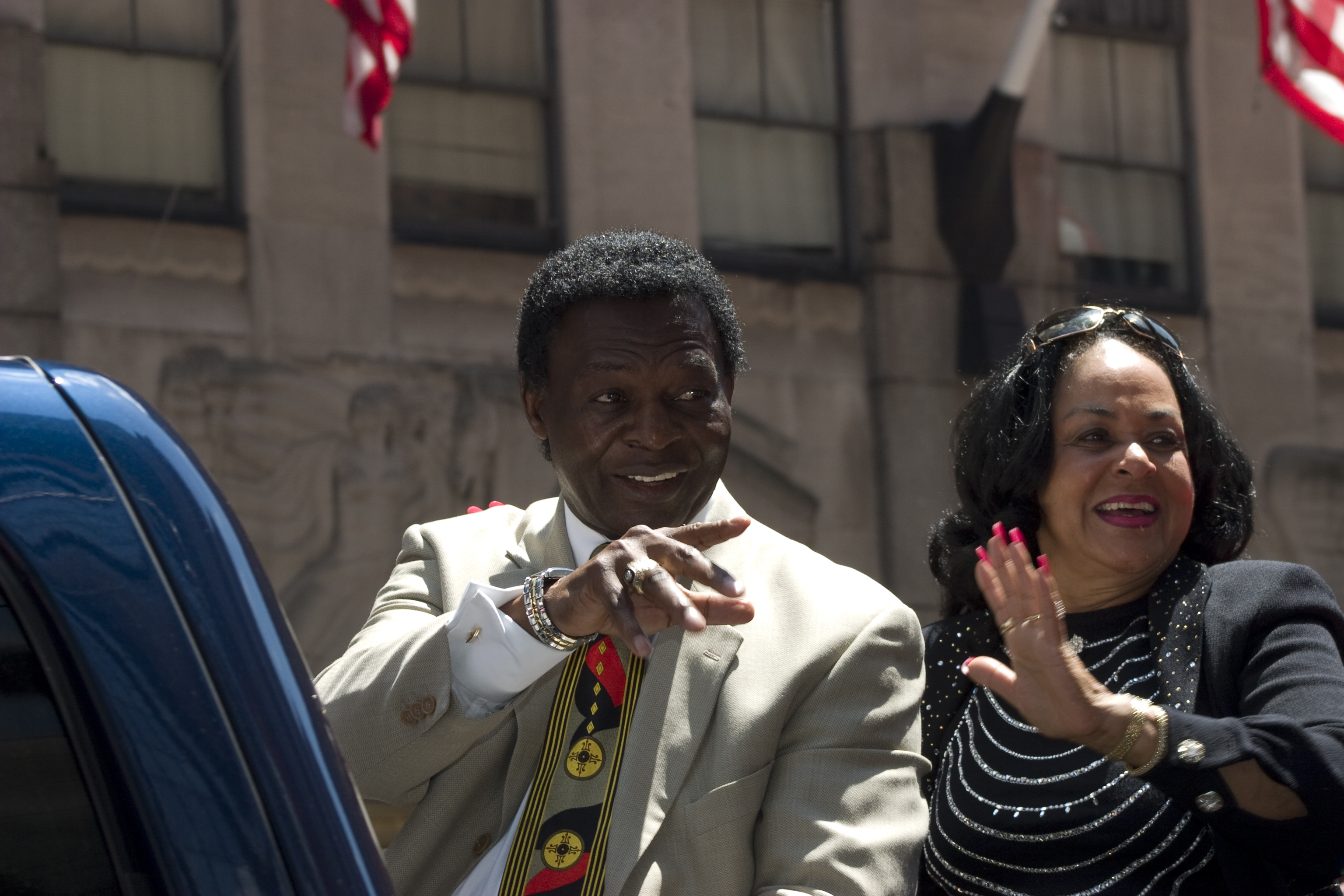
Lou Brock ranks second in franchise history in multiple career batting categories.

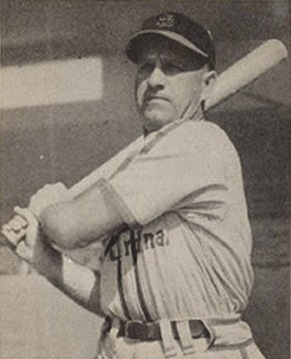
Enos Slaughter ranks in the top five in multiple career batting categories.

Note: 1,500 plate appearances (PA) required for rate statistics.

All-time career batting records
Category	Record	2nd place	3rd place	4th place	5th place
Batting average	**.378** Jesse Burkett	.359 Rogers Hornsby	.344 Tip O'Neill	.336 Johnny Mize	.335 Joe Medwick
On-base percentage	**.444** Jesse Burkett	.427 Rogers Hornsby, Mark McGwire		.419 Johnny Mize	.417 Stan Musial, Albert Pujols
Slugging percentage	**.683** Mark McGwire	.614 Albert Pujols	.600 Johnny Mize	.568 Chick Hafey, Rogers Hornsby	
On-base plus slugging	**1.111** Mark McGwire	1.031 Albert Pujols	1.018 Johnny Mize	.995 Rogers Hornsby	.976 Stan Musial
Adjusted on-base plus slugging	**180** Mark McGwire	177 Rogers Hornsby	171 Johnny Mize	169 Albert Pujols	164 Jesse Burkett
Games played	**3,026** Stan Musial	2,289 Lou Brock	2,224 Yadier Molina	1,990 Ozzie Smith	1,820 Enos Slaughter
Plate appearances	**12,721** Stan Musial	9,932 Lou Brock	8,554 Yadier Molina	8,242 Ozzie Smith	7,784 Albert Pujols
At bats	**10,972** Stan Musial	9,125 Lou Brock	7,817 Yadier Molina	7,160 Ozzie Smith	6,841 Red Schoendienst
Runs	**1,949** Stan Musial	1,427 Lou Brock	1,333 Albert Pujols	1,089 Rogers Hornsby	1,071 Enos Slaughter
Hits	**3,630** Stan Musial	2,713 Lou Brock	2,168 Yadier Molina	2,156 Albert Pujols	2,110 Rogers Hornsby
Total bases	**6,134** Stan Musial	4,062 Albert Pujols	3,776 Lou Brock	3,342 Rogers Hornsby	3,138 Enos Slaughter
Singles	**2,253** Stan Musial	2,029 Lou Brock	1,577 Yadier Molina	1,529 Ozzie Smith	1,498 Red Schoendienst
Doubles	**725** Stan Musial	469 Albert Pujols	434 Lou Brock	408 Yadier Molina	377 Joe Medwick
Triples	**177** Stan Musial	143 Rogers Hornsby	135 Enos Slaughter	121 Lou Brock	119 Jim Bottomley
Home runs	**475** Stan Musial	469 Albert Pujols	255 Ken Boyer	241 Jim Edmonds	228 Ray Lankford
Runs batted in	**1,951** Stan Musial	1,397 Albert Pujols	1,148 Enos Slaughter	1,105 Jim Bottomley	1,072 Rogers Hornsby
Bases on balls	**1,599** Stan Musial	1,003 Albert Pujols	876 Ozzie Smith	838 Enos Slaughter	780 Ray Lankford
Strikeouts	**1,469** Lou Brock	1,449 Ray Lankford	1,123 Matt Carpenter	1,029 Jim Edmonds	926 Willie McGee
Stolen bases	**888** Lou Brock	549 Vince Coleman	433 Ozzie Smith	369 Arlie Latham	333 Charles Comiskey
Stolen base percentage	**86.18** Tommy Edman	82.68 Vince Coleman	80.94 Ozzie Smith	80.00 Andy Van Slyke	77.88 Kolten Wong
Runs created	**2,552** Stan Musial	1,668 Albert Pujols	1,425 Rogers Hornsby	1,367 Lou Brock	1,188 Enos Slaughter
Extra-base hits	**1,377** Stan Musial	953 Albert Pujols	703 Rogers Hornsby	684 Lou Brock	647 Enos Slaughter
Times on base	**5,282** Stan Musial	3,434 Lou Brock	3,246 Albert Pujols	2,936 Enos Slaughter	2,841 Ozzie Smith
Power–speed number	**238.5** Ray Lankford	225.3 Lou Brock	146.5 Rogers Hornsby	143.9 Albert Pujols	140.5 Ken Boyer
Hit by pitch	**87** Steve Evans, Albert Pujols		79 Fernando Viña	76 Yadier Molina	71 Kolten Wong
Sacrifice hits	**154** Jim Bottomley	147 Marty Marion	135 Rogers Hornsby	131 Ozzie Smith, Milt Stock	
Sacrifice flies	**75** Yadier Molina	74 Albert Pujols	67 Ted Simmons	54 Ozzie Smith	53 Stan Musial
Double plays grounded into	**287** Yadier Molina	245 Albert Pujols	243 Stan Musial	185 Ted Simmons	154 Ken Boyer
Intentional bases on balls	**298** Stan Musial	252 Albert Pujols	151 Ted Simmons	118 Lou Brock	96 Johnny Mize
At bats per strikeout	**38.0** Frankie Frisch	35.8 Joe Quinn	31.2 Jimmy Brown	28.7 Roger Connor	26.0 Bill Gleason
At bats per home run	**7.9** Mark McGwire	14.1 Albert Pujols	15.1 Jim Edmonds	17.9 Ron Gant	18.8 Tyler O'Neill
Outs made	**7,744** Stan Musial	6,882 Lou Brock	6,091 Yadier Molina	5,631 Ozzie Smith	5,156 Red Schoendienst

=== Pitching ===
Top career pitching leaders
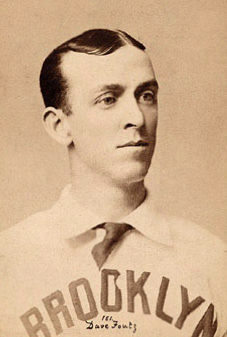
Dave Foutz ranks third in franchise history in ERA and fourth in winning percentage (first for all with 100+ decisions).

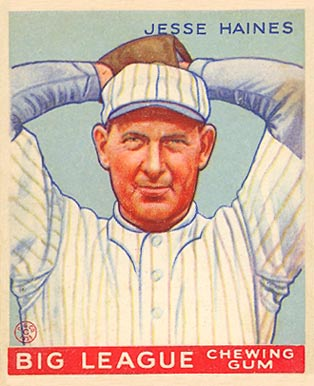
Jesse Haines ranks second in franchise history in wins, innings and complete games.

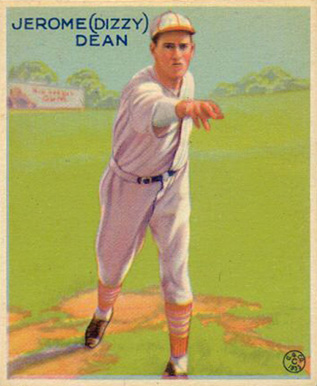
Dizzy Dean ranks third in team history in strikeouts and fifth in shutouts.

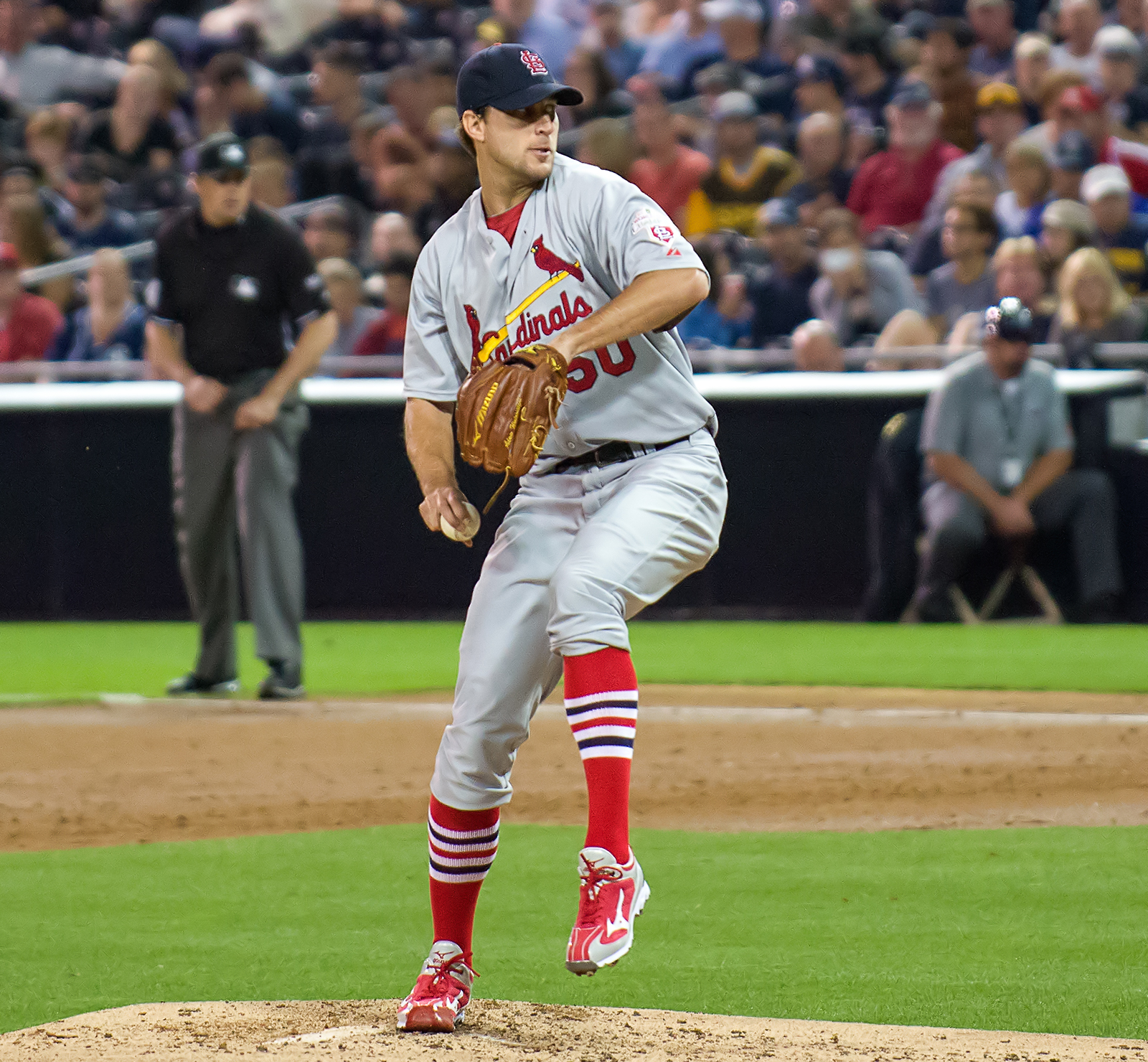
Adam Wainwright ranks second in franchise history in strikeouts, strikeouts per nine innings pitched and strikeout-to-walk ratio.

Notes: 500 innings pitched (IP) and 50 decisions qualify for career rate statistics.

All-time career pitching records
Category	Record	2nd place	3rd place	4th place	5th place
ERA	**2.46** Ed Karger	2.52 John Tudor	2.67 Dave Foutz, Slim Sallee, Jack Taylor		
Adjusted ERA+	**146** John Tudor	143 Silver King	139 Ice Box Chamberlain	137 Jack Stivetts, Cy Young	
Wins	**251** Bob Gibson	210 Jesse Haines	200 Adam Wainwright	163 Bob Forsch	153 Bill Sherdel
Losses	**174** Bob Gibson	158 Jesse Haines	136 Bill Doak	131 Bill Sherdel	128 Adam Wainwright
Winning percentage	**.719** Ice Box Chamberlain	.718 Ted Wilks	.705 John Tudor	.704 Dave Foutz	.700 Silver King, Tony Mullane
Games played	**554** Jesse Haines	528 Bob Gibson	478 Adam Wainwright	465 Bill Sherdel	455 Bob Forsch
Games started	**482** Bob Gibson	411 Adam Wainwright	401 Bob Forsch	387 Jesse Haines	320 Bill Doak
Innings pitched	**3,884.1** Bob Gibson	3,203.2 Jesse Haines	2,668.1 Adam Wainwright	2,658.2 Bob Forsch	2,450.2 Bill Sherdel
Complete games	**255** Bob Gibson	209 Jesse Haines	198 Ted Breitenstein	156 Dave Foutz	154 Silver King
Shutouts	**56** Bob Gibson	30 Bill Doak	28 Mort Cooper	25 Harry Brecheen	23 Dizzy Dean, Jesse Haines
Saves	**217** Jason Isringhausen	160 Lee Smith	129 Todd Worrell	127 Bruce Sutter	121 Trevor Rosenthal
Games finished	**332** Jason Isringhausen	232 Todd Worrell	209 Lee Smith	203 Bruce Sutter	188 Lindy McDaniel
Hits allowed	**3,455** Jesse Haines	3,279 Bob Gibson	2,721 Bill Sherdel	2,602 Bob Forsch	2,577 Adam Wainwright
Earned runs allowed	**1,297** Jesse Haines	1,258 Bob Gibson	1,085 Bob Forsch	1,047 Adam Wainwright	992 Bill Sherdel
Strikeouts	**3,117** Bob Gibson	2,202 Adam Wainwright	1,095 Dizzy Dean	1,085 Chris Carpenter	1,079 Bob Forsch
Bases on balls allowed	**1,336** Bob Gibson	870 Jesse Haines	843 Ted Breitenstein	780 Bob Forsch	740 Bill Doak
Home runs allowed	**257** Bob Gibson	233 Adam Wainwright	204 Bob Forsch	165 Jesse Haines	152 Larry Jackson
Hit batsmen	**102** Bob Gibson	81 Adam Wainwright	72 Willie Sudhoff	68 Silver King	59 Carlos Martínez
Wild pitches	**111** Jumbo McGinnis	108 Bob Gibson	88 Bob Forsch	78 Silver King	77 Dave Foutz
Batters faced	**16,068** Bob Gibson	13,624 Jesse Haines	11,116 Adam Wainwright	11,088 Bob Forsch	10,473 Bill Sherdel
WHIP	**1.080** John Tudor	1.095 Bob Caruthers	1.098 Jumbo McGinnis	1.122 Silver King	1.125 Chris Carpenter
Strikeout-to-walk ratio	**3.929** Miles Mikolas	3.666 Chris Carpenter	3.272 Bob Tewksbury	2.992 Adam Wainwright	2.917 Jack Flaherty
Strikeouts per nine innings pitched	**10.038** Jack Flaherty	8.628 Carlos Martínez	8.449 Lance Lynn	7.971 Todd Stottlemyre	7.873 Michael Wacha
Bases on balls per nine innings pitched	**1.042** Cy Young	1.161 Bob Tewksbury	1.379 Jumbo McGinnis	1.386 Grover Cleveland Alexander	1.587 Bob Caruthers
Hits per nine innings pitched	**7.223** Jack Flaherty	7.286 Fred Beebe	7.597 Bob Gibson	7.630 José DeLeón	7.660 Ice Box Chamberlain
Home runs per nine innings pitched	**.042** Ed Karger	.082 Jumbo McGinnis	.087 Red Ames	.104 Mike O'Neill	.105 Fred Beebe

== All-time single-season individual records ==
=== Batting ===
Single-season batting leaders
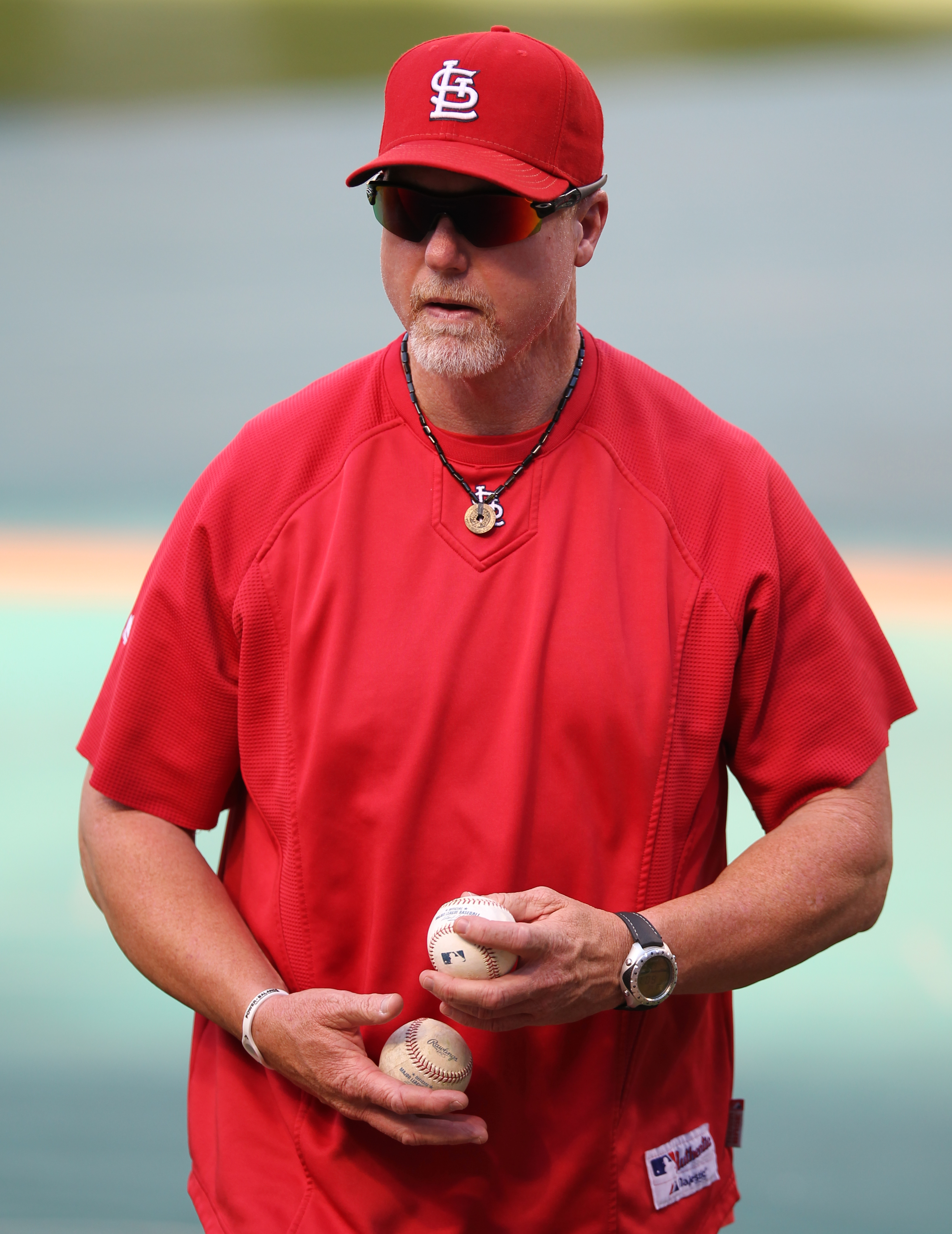
Mark McGwire leads in four categories and is second in six.

All-time individual single-season batting records
Category	Record	2nd place	3rd place	4th place	5th place
Batting average	**.435** (1887) Tip O'Neill	.424 (1924) Rogers Hornsby	.403 (1925) Rogers Hornsby	.401 (1922) Rogers Hornsby	.397 (1921) Rogers Hornsby
On-base percentage	**.507** (1924) Rogers Hornsby	.505 (1900) John McGraw	.490 (1887) Tip O'Neill	.489 (1925) Rogers Hornsby	.470 (1998) Mark McGwire
Slugging percentage	**.756** (1925) Rogers Hornsby	.752 (1998) Mark McGwire	.722 (1922) Rogers Hornsby	.702 (1948) Stan Musial	.697 (1999) Mark McGwire
On-base plus slugging	**1.245** (1925) Rogers Hornsby	1.222 (1998) Mark McGwire	1.203 (1924) Rogers Hornsby	1.181 (1922) Rogers Hornsby	1.180 (1887) Tip O'Neill
Adjusted on-base plus slugging	**222** (1924) Rogers Hornsby	216 (1998) Mark McGwire	213 (1887) Tip O'Neill	210 (1925) Rogers Hornsby	207 (1922) Rogers Hornsby
Games played	**163** (1989) José Oquendo	162 Ken Boyer (1964), Curt Flood (1964), Pedro Guerrero (1989), Terry Pendleton (1989), Bill White (1963)			
Plate appearances	**752** (1928) Taylor Douthit	748 (1930) Taylor Douthit	739 (1964) Curt Flood	729 (1970) Lou Brock	728 (1957) Don Blasingame
At bats	**689** (1967) Lou Brock	679 (1964) Curt Flood	672 (1979) Garry Templeton	664 Lou Brock (1970), Taylor Douthit (1930)	
Runs	**167** (1887) Tip O'Neill	163 (1887) Arlie Latham	152 (1886) Arlie Latham	142 (1901) Jesse Burkett	141 (1922) Rogers Hornsby
Hits	**250** (1922) Rogers Hornsby	237 (1937) Joe Medwick	235 (1921) Rogers Hornsby	230 Stan Musial (1948), Joe Torre (1971)	
Total bases	**450** (1922) Rogers Hornsby	429 (1948) Stan Musial	406 (1937) Joe Medwick	394 (2003) Albert Pujols	389 (2004) Albert Pujols
Singles	**185** (1899) Jesse Burkett	181 (1901) Jesse Burkett	178 (1964) Curt Flood	170 Jesse Burkett (1900), Milt Stock (1920)	
Doubles	**64** (1936) Joe Medwick	56 (1937) Joe Medwick	55 (2013) Matt Carpenter	53 (1953) Stan Musial	52 Tip O'Neill (1887), Enos Slaughter (1939)
Triples	**29** (1893) Perry Werden	25 Roger Connor (1894), Tom Long (1915)		20 Jim Bottomley (1928), Duff Cooley (1895), Rogers Hornsby (1920), Stan Musial (1943, 1946)	
Home runs	**70** (1998) Mark McGwire	65 (1999) Mark McGwire	49 (2006) Albert Pujols	47 (2009) Albert Pujols	46 (2004) Albert Pujols
Runs batted in	**154** (1937) Joe Medwick	152 (1922) Rogers Hornsby	147 (1998, 1999) Mark McGwire		143 (1925) Rogers Hornsby
Bases on balls	**162** (1998) Mark McGwire	136 Jack Clark (1987), Jack Crooks (1892)		133 (1999) Mark McGwire	121 (1893) Jack Crooks
Strikeouts	**173** (2024) Paul Goldschmidt	168 (2021) Tyler O'Neill	167 (2000) Jim Edmonds	166 (2019) Paul Goldschmidt	162 (1997) Ron Gant
Stolen bases	**129** (1887) Arlie Latham	118 (1974) Lou Brock	117 (1887) Charlie Comiskey	110 (1985) Vince Coleman	109 Vince Coleman (1987), Arlie Latham (1888)
Stolen base percentage	**93.75** (2019) Tommy Edman	91.43 (2022) Tommy Edman	91.18 (1985) Tom Herr	89.47 (2025) **Victor Scott II**	88.89 (2005) Albert Pujols
Runs created	**202** (1922) Rogers Hornsby	193 (1998) Mark McGwire	192 (1948) Stan Musial	185 (1925) Rogers Hornsby	183 (1924) Rogers Hornsby
Extra-base hits	**103** (1948) Stan Musial	102 (1922) Rogers Hornsby	99 (2004) Albert Pujols	97 (1937) Joe Medwick	95 Joe Medwick (1936), Albert Pujols (2003)
Times on base	**320** (1998) Mark McGwire	318 (1924) Rogers Hornsby	316 Rogers Hornsby (1922), Stan Musial (1949)		312 (1948) Stan Musial
Power–speed number	**29.9** (1967) Lou Brock	28.3 (1998) Ray Lankford	27.1 (1992) Ray Lankford	26.3 (1996) Ray Lankford	26.0 (1999) Fernando Tatís
Hit by pitch	**31** (1910) Steve Evans	29 (1890) Chief Roseman	28 (2000) Fernando Viña	24 (1900) Dan McGann	23 **Willson Contreras** (2025), Dan McGann (1901), John McGraw (1900)
Sacrifice hits	**37** (1926) Taylor Douthit	36 Milt Stock (1921), Harry Walker (1943)		34 (1914) Lee Magee	31 Les Bell (1926), Doc Lavan (1920)
Sacrifice flies	**14** (1982) George Hendrick	13 (1985) Tom Herr	12 Pedro Guerrero (1989), Keith Hernandez (1982), Tom Herr (1987)		
Double plays grounded into	**31** (2013) Matt Holliday	29 Albert Pujols (2011), Ted Simmons (1973)		27 Yadier Molina (2009), Albert Pujols (2007)	
Intentional bases on balls	**44** (2009) Albert Pujols	38 (2010) Albert Pujols	34 (2008) Albert Pujols	28 Mark McGwire (1998),	
At bats per strikeout	**78.1** (1893, 1895) Joe Quinn		75.3 (1898) Lave Cross	61.7 (1927) Frankie Frisch	55.1 (1942) Jimmy Brown
At bats per home run	**7.3** (1998) Mark McGwire	8.0 (1999) Mark McGwire	10.9 (2006) Albert Pujols	11.5 (2003) Jim Edmonds	11.9 (2004) Jim Edmonds
Outs made	**519** (1947) Red Schoendienst	512 (1967) Lou Brock	500 Vince Coleman (1985, 1988), Curt Flood (1964)		

=== Pitching ===
Notes: 100 IP and 10 decisions qualify for rate statistics.

All-time individual single-season pitching records
Category	Record	2nd place	3rd place	4th place	5th place
ERA	**1.12** (1968) Bob Gibson	1.63 (1888) Silver King	1.72 (1914) Bill Doak	1.78 (1942) Mort Cooper	1.90 (1943) Max Lanier
Adjusted ERA+	**258** (1968) Bob Gibson	195 (1888) Silver King	192 (1942) Mort Cooper	186 (1889) Jack Stivetts	185 (1985) John Tudor
Wins	**45** (1888) Silver King	41 (1886) Dave Foutz	40 (1885) Bob Caruthers	35 Silver King (1889), Tony Mullane (1883)	
Losses	**35** (1897) Red Donahue	30 (1895) Ted Breitenstein	29 Bill Hart (1896), Jack Taylor (1898)		27 Bill Hart (1897), Pink Hawley (1894), Willie Sudhoff (1898)
Winning percentage	**.842** (2012) Kyle Lohse	.818 (2018) Miles Mikolas	.813 Al Hrabosky (1975), Howie Krist (1942)		.811 (1934) Dizzy Dean
Games played	**89** (2001) Steve Kline	86 (2004) Ray King	81 (2015) Kevin Siegrist	78 Mitchell Boggs (2012), Steve Kline (2003), Jason Motte (2011)	
Games started	**64** (1888) Silver King	57 (1886) Dave Foutz	56 (1891) Jack Stivetts	53 Bob Caruthers (1885), Silver King (1889)	
Innings pitched	**584.2** (1888) Silver King	504 (1886) Dave Foutz	482.1 (1885) Bob Caruthers	460.2 (1883) Tony Mullane	458 (1889) Silver King
Complete games	**64** (1888) Silver King	55 (1886) Dave Foutz	53 (1885) Bob Caruthers	49 (1883) Tony Mullane	47 Ted Breitenstein (1895), Silver King (1889)
Shutouts	**13** (1968) Bob Gibson	11 (1886) Dave Foutz	10 Mort Cooper (1942), John Tudor (1985)		7 Harry Brecheen (1948), Mort Cooper (1944), Dizzy Dean (1934), Bill Doak (1914)
Saves	**49** (2024) Ryan Helsley	48 (2015) Trevor Rosenthal	47 Jason Isringhausen (2004), Lee Smith (1991)		45 Trevor Rosenthal (2014), Bruce Sutter (1984)
Games finished	**66** (2004) Jason Isringhausen	63 (1984) Bruce Sutter	62 (2024) Ryan Helsley	61 Lee Smith (1991), Dave Veres (2000)	
Hits allowed	**497** (1894) Ted Breitenstein	485 (1897) Red Donahue	481 (1894) Pink Hawley	468 (1895) Ted Breitenstein	465 (1898) Jack Taylor
Earned runs allowed	**238** (1894) Ted Breitenstein	237 (1897) Red Donahue	214 (1894) Pink Hawley	213 (1895) Ted Breitenstein	205 (1897) Bill Hart
Strikeouts	**289** (1890) Jack Stivetts	283 (1886) Dave Foutz	274 (1970) Bob Gibson	270 (1965) Bob Gibson	269 (1969) Bob Gibson
Bases on balls allowed	**232** (1891) Jack Stivetts	191 (1894) Ted Breitenstein	187 (1893) Kid Gleason	182 (1895) Ted Breitenstein	181 (1911) Bob Harmon
Home runs allowed	**39** (1948) Murry Dickson	35 Jason Marquis (2006), Matt Morris (2004), Brett Tomko (2003)			34 Bob Gibson (1965), Dustin Hermanson (2001)
Hit batsmen	**30** (1888) Silver King	27 (1898) Willie Sudhoff	25 (1898) Jack Taylor	22 (1897) Red Donahue	21 Pink Hawley (1894), Silver King (1889)
Wild pitches	**40** (1882) Jumbo McGinnis	36 (1889) Silver King	29 (1890) Jack Stivetts	28 Toad Ramsey (1890), Jack Stivetts (1891)	
Batters faced	**2,286** (1888) Silver King	2,091 (1886) Dave Foutz	1,987 (1894) Ted Breitenstein	1,966 (1889) Silver King	1,948 (1885) Bob Caruthers
WHIP	**.853** (1968) Bob Gibson	.874 (1888) Silver King	.938 (1985) John Tudor	.954 (1967) Dick Hughes	.968 Jack Flaherty (2019), Tony Mullane (1883)
Strikeout-to-walk ratio	**6.257** (2013) Adam Wainwright	5.289 (2025) **Sonny Gray**	5.205 (2024) **Sonny Gray**	5.034 (2018) Miles Mikolas	4.880 (2024) Miles Mikolas
Strikeouts per nine innings pitched	**10.984** (2024) **Sonny Gray**	10.589 (2019) Jack Flaherty	10.013 (2025) **Sonny Gray**	9.977 (2000) Rick Ankiel	9.527 (2017) Carlos Martínez
Bases on balls per nine innings pitched	**.773** (1992) Bob Tewksbury	.842 (1993) Bob Tewksbury	.889 (1884) Jumbo McGinnis	1.008 (1900) Cy Young	1.064 (1885) Bob Caruthers
Hits per nine innings pitched	**5.849** (1968) Bob Gibson	6.188 (2019) Jack Flaherty	6.364 (1989) José DeLeón	6.442 (1906) Fred Beebe	6.549 (1908) Bugs Raymond
Home runs per nine innings pitched	**.033** (1902) Stan Yerkes	.038 Fred Beebe (1907), Bob Harmon (1910)		.041 Johnny Lush (1909), Mike O'Neill (1904)	

== Single-season individual records divided by era ==
=== Batting ===
Note: Minimum 250 plate appearances (PA) for rate statistics for seasons 1882–91. From 1892–present, the minimum number of PA is 300. Minimum 16 stolen base attempts qualifies for stolen base percentage. Since 1951 only.

American Association single-season batting records (1882–91)
Category	Record	2nd place	3rd place	4th place	5th place	Refs
Batting average	**.435** (1887) Tip O'Neill	.366 (1889) Jocko Milligan	.357 (1887) Bob Caruthers	.357 (1887) Dave Foutz	.350 (1890) Tommy McCarthy	
On-base percentage	**.490** (1887) Tip O'Neill	.463 (1887) Bob Caruthers	.449 (1890) Chief Roseman	.448 (1886) Bob Caruthers	.445 (1891) Denny Lyons	
Slugging percentage	**.691** (1887) Tip O'Neill	.623 (1889) Jocko Milligan	.547 (1887) Bob Caruthers	.527 (1886) Bob Caruthers	.513 (1890) Count Campau	
On-base plus slugging	**1.180** (1887) Tip O'Neill	1.030 (1889) Jocko Milligan	1.010 (1887) Bob Caruthers	.974 (1886) Bob Caruthers	.901 (1887) Dave Foutz	
Adjusted on-base plus slugging	**213** (1887) Tip O'Neill	201 (1886) Bob Caruthers	179 (1889) Jocko Milligan	169 (1887) Bob Caruthers	158 (1888) Tip O'Neill	
Games played	**140** Shorty Fuller, Tommy McCarthy (1889)		139 Dummy Hoy, Charles Comiskey (1891)		138 Curt Welch, Tip O'Neill (1886)	
Plate appearances	**688** (1891) Dummy Hoy	677 (1887) Arlie Latham	656 (1889) Tommy McCarthy	647 Shorty Fuller (1891) Bill Gleason (1887)		
At bats	**627** (1887) Arlie Latham	604 (1889) Tommy McCarthy	598 (1887) Bill Gleason	587 (1889) Charles Comiskey	579 (1886) Tip O'Neill	
Runs	**167** (1887) Tip O'Neill	163 (1887) Arlie Latham	152 (1886) Arlie Latham	139 (1887) Charles Comiskey	137 (1890) Tommy McCarthy	
Hits	**225** (1887) Tip O'Neill	198 (1887) Arlie Latham	192 (1890) Tommy McCarthy	190 (1886) Tip O'Neill	180 (1887) Charles Comiskey	
Total bases	**357** (1887) Tip O'Neill	259 (1887) Arlie Latham	256 (1890) Tommy McCarthy	255 (1886, 1889) Tip O'Neill		
Doubles	**52** (1887) Tip O'Neill	35 (1887) Arlie Latham	33 (1889) Tip O'Neill	32 Curt Welch (1887) Yank Robinson (1887)		
Triples	**19** (1887) Tip O'Neill	14 (1886) Tip O'Neill, Bob Caruthers		13 Dave Foutz (1887) Curt Welch (1886)		
Home runs	**16** (1889) Charlie Duffee	14 (1887) Tip O'Neill	12 (1889) Jocko Milligan	11 (1891) Denny Lyons	10 (1891) Tip O'Neill	
RBI	**123** (1887) Tip O'Neill	110 (1889) Tip O'Neill	108 (1887) Curt Welch, Dave Foutz		107 (1886) Tip O'Neill	
Bases on balls	**118** (1889) Yank Robinson	117 (1891) Dummy Hoy	116 (1888) Yank Robinson	92 (1887) Yank Robinson	88 (1891) Denny Lyons	
Strikeouts	**81** (1889) Charlie Duffee	78 (1888) Yank Robinson	64 (1888) Silver King	58 (1891) Denny Lyons	56 (1889) Shorty Fuller	
Stolen bases	**129** (1887) Arlie Latham	117 (1887) Charles Comiskey	109 (1888) Arlie Latham	93 (1888) Tommy McCarthy	89 (1887) Curt Welch	
Runs created	**173** (1887) Tip O'Neill	108 (1890) Tommy McCarthy	106 (1889) Tip O'Neill	97 (1886) Tip O'Neill	94 (1887) Arlie Latham	
Extra base hits	**85** (1887) Tip O'Neill	50 (1889) Tip O'Neill	47 (1887) Arlie Latham	46 (1886) Curt Welch	45 (1886) Tip O'Neill	
Times on base	**292** (1891) Dummy Hoy	280 (1887) Tip O'Neill	269 (1890) Tommy McCarthy	256 (1886) Tip O'Neill	248 Denny Lyons (1891) Arlie Latham (1887)	
Hit by pitch	**29** (1890) Chief Roseman	18 (1891) Denny Lyons	17 (1887) Yank Robinson	15 Bill Gleason (1885) Yank Robinson (1886)		
At bats per strikeout	**48.91** (1887) Charles Comiskey	30.95 (1889) Charles Comiskey	30.00 (1891) Tommy McCarthy	26.00 (1887) Bill Gleason	25.90 (1887) Curt Welch	
Outs made	**454** (1891) Shorty Fuller	431 (1886) Charles Comiskey	429 (1887) Arlie Latham	428 (1889) Tommy McCarthy	426 (1887) Bill Gleason	

Early National League / "Dead-ball era" single-season batting records (1892–1920)
Category	Record	2nd place	3rd place	4th place	5th place	Refs
Batting average	**.396** (1899) Jesse Burkett *	.376 (1901) Jesse Burkett *	.370 (1920) Rogers Hornsby	.363 (1900) Jesse Burkett *	.344 (1900) John McGraw *	
On-base percentage	**.505** (1900) John McGraw *	.463 (1899) Jesse Burkett *	.440 (1901) Jesse Burkett *	.432 (1913) Miller Huggins^{#}	.431 (1920) Rogers Hornsby	
Slugging percentage	**.582** (1894) Roger Connor *	.559 (1920) Rogers Hornsby	.509 (1901) Jesse Burkett *	.504 (1895) Roger Connor *	.500 (1899) Jesse Burkett *	
On-base plus slugging	**.991** (1894) Roger Connor *	.990 (1920) Rogers Hornsby	.963 (1899) Jesse Burkett *	.949 (1901) Jesse Burkett *	.924 (1895) Roger Connor *	
Adjusted on-base plus slugging	**185** (1920) Rogers Hornsby	181 (1901) Jesse Burkett *	169 (1917) Rogers Hornsby	167 (1904) Mike Grady *	161 (1899) Jesse Burkett *	
Games played	**158** (1911) Ed Konetchy	155 Milt Stock (1920), Dots Miller (1914), Rube Ellis * (1911)			154 6 total	
Plate appearances	**708** (1920) Milt Stock	688 (1920) Miller Huggins^{#}	680 Ed Konetchy (1911) Pug Bennett * (1906)		673 (1901) Jesse Burkett *	
At bats	**639** (1920) Milt Stock	602 Lave Cross (1898) Steve Brodie * (1892)		601 (1901) Jesse Burkett *	598 (1892) Perry Werden	
Runs	**142** (1901) Jesse Burkett *	116 (1899) Jesse Burkett *	114 (1893) Tommy Dowd	109 (1899) Emmet Heidrick	108 (1895) Duff Cooley *	
Hits	**226** (1901) Jesse Burkett *	221 (1899) Jesse Burkett *	218 (1920) Rogers Hornsby	204 (1920) Milt Stock	203 (1900) Jesse Burkett *	
Total bases	**329** (1920) Rogers Hornsby	306 (1901) Jesse Burkett *	279 (1899) Jesse Burkett *	265 (1900) Jesse Burkett *	264 (1895) Duff Cooley *	
Doubles	**44** (1920) Rogers Hornsby	38 (1911) Ed Konetchy	34 (1901) Bobby Wallace	33 (1920) Jack Fournier *	29 (1911) Mike Mowrey	
Triples	**29** (1893) Perry Werden	25 Tom Long (1915) Roger Connor * (1894)		20 Duff Cooley * (1895) Rogers Hornsby (1920)		
Home runs	**12** Bobby Wallace (1899) Bones Ely (1894)		11 (1896) Roger Connor *	10 Austin McHenry (1920), Jesse Burkett * (1901) Mike Donlin * (1900)		
RBI	**108** (1899) Bobby Wallace	94 Rogers Hornsby (1920) Perry Werden (1893)		91 (1901) Bobby Wallace	89 (1894) Bones Ely	
Bases on balls	**136** (1892) Jack Crooks	121 (1893) Jack Crooks	116 (1910) Miller Huggins^{#}	105 (1914) Miller Huggins^{#}	96 (1911) Miller Huggins^{#}	
Strikeouts	**80** (1906) George McBride	77 (1916) Bruno Betzel	76 (1909) Rube Ellis *	74 (1914) Cozy Dolan *	73 Austin McHenry (1920), Walton Cruise * (1917), Bobby Byrne (1907)	
Stolen bases	**59** (1893) Tommy Dowd	55 (1899) Emmet Heidrick *	48 (1908) Red Murray	45 (1900) Patsy Donovan *	42 (1914) Cozy Dolan	
Runs created	**136** (1920) Rogers Hornsby	132 (1901) Jesse Burkett *	129 (1899) Jesse Burkett *	113 (1900) Jesse Burkett *	101 (1895) Duff Cooley *	
Extra base hits	**73** (1920) Rogers Hornsby	60 (1894) Roger Connor *	57 (1911) Ed Konetchy	54 (1901) Bobby Wallace	52 (1893) Perry Werden	
Times on base	**295** (1901) Jesse Burkett *	290 (1899) Jesse Burkett *	281 (1920) Rogers Hornsby	268 (1900) Jesse Burkett *	276 (1914) Miller Huggins^{#}	
Hit by pitch	**31** (1910) Steve Evans	24 (1900) Dan McGann	23 Dan McGann (1901) John McGraw * (1900)		22 (1898) Dick Harley *	
Sacrifice hits	**35** (1914) Lee Magee^{#}	31 (1920) Doc Lavan	29 (1904) Spike Shannon^{#}	28 Milt Stock (1920) Arnold Hauser (1911)		
At bats per strikeout	**134.33** (1899) Lave Cross	78.14 (1893, 1895) Joe Quinn		75.25 (1898) Lave Cross	69.25 (1899) Ed McKean	
Outs made	**480** (1920) Milt Stock	460 (1906) Pug Bennett *	457 (1898) Tommy Dowd	450 Bob Bescher^{#} (1916) Dots Miller (1915)		

War era to early expansion era single-season batting records (1921–68)
Category	Record	2nd place	3rd place	4th place	5th place	Ref
Batting average	**.424** (1924) Rogers Hornsby	.403 (1925) Rogers Hornsby	.401 (1922) Rogers Hornsby	.397 (1921) Rogers Hornsby	.384 (1923) Rogers Hornsby	
On-base percentage	**.507** (1924) Rogers Hornsby	.489 (1925) Rogers Hornsby	.459 (1923) Rogers Hornsby	.459 (1922) Rogers Hornsby	.458 (1921) Rogers Hornsby	
Slugging percentage	**.756** (1925) Rogers Hornsby	.722 (1922) Rogers Hornsby	.702 (1948) Stan Musial	.696 (1924) Rogers Hornsby	.652 (1930) Chick Hafey	
On-base plus slugging	**1.245** (1925) Rogers Hornsby	1.203 (1924) Rogers Hornsby	1.181 (1922) Rogers Hornsby	1.152 (1948) Stan Musial *	1.201 (1921) Rogers Hornsby	
Adjusted on-base plus slugging	**222** (1924) Rogers Hornsby	210 (1925) Rogers Hornsby	207 (1922) Rogers Hornsby	200 (1948) Stan Musial *	191 (1921) Rogers Hornsby	
Games played	**162** Ken Boyer & Curt Flood (1964), Bill White * (1963)			161 Dick Groat (1964) Julián Javier (1963)		
Plate appearances	**752** (1928) Taylor Douthit	748 (1930) Taylor Douthit	739 (1964) Curt Flood	728 (1957) Don Blasingame *	726 (1963) Bill White *	
At bats	**689** (1967) Lou Brock *	679 (1964) Curt Flood	664 (1930) Taylor Douthit	662 (1963) Curt Flood	660 (1968) Lou Brock *	
Runs	**141** (1922) Rogers Hornsby	135 (1948) Stan Musial *	133 (1925) Rogers Hornsby	132 (1935) Joe Medwick	131 (1921) Rogers Hornsby	
Hits	**250** (1922) Rogers Hornsby	237 (1937) Joe Medwick	235 (1921) Rogers Hornsby	230 (1948) Stan Musial *	228 (1946) Stan Musial *	
Total bases	**450** (1922) Rogers Hornsby	429 (1948) Stan Musial *	406 (1937) Joe Medwick	382 (1949) Stan Musial	381 (1925) Rogers Hornsby	
Doubles	**64** (1936) Joe Medwick	56 (1937) Joe Medwick	53 (1953) Stan Musial *	52 (1939) Enos Slaughter *	51 (1944) Stan Musial	
Triples	**20** Stan Musial * (1943, 1946), Jim Bottomley * (1928)			18 Stan Musial * (1948), Joe Medwick (1934), Rogers Hornsby (1921)		
Home runs	**43** (1940) Johnny Mize *	42 (1922) Rogers Hornsby	39 Stan Musial * (1948) Rogers Hornsby (1925)		36 (1949) Stan Musial *	
RBI	**154** (1937) Joe Medwick	152 (1922) Rogers Hornsby	143 (1925) Rogers Hornsby	138 (1936) Joe Medwick	137 (1940) Johnny Mize *	
Bases on balls	**107** (1949) Stan Musial *	105 (1953) Stan Musial *	103 (1954) Stan Musial *	98 (1951) Stan Musial *	96 Solly Hemus * (1952) Stan Musial * (1952)	
Strikeouts	**134** (1966) Lou Brock *	125 (1953) Steve Bilko	124 (1968) Lou Brock *	116 (1965) Lou Brock *	114 (1968) Mike Shannon	
Stolen bases	**74** (1966) Lou Brock *	63 (1965) Lou Brock *	62 (1968) Lou Brock *	52 (1967) Lou Brock *	48 (1927) Frankie Frisch ^{#}	
Stolen base percentage (Since 1951)	**83.78** (1968) Lou Brock *	82.61 (1960) Julián Javier	80.44 (1966) Lou Brock *	80.00 (1958) Don Blasingame *	76.47 (1963) George Altman *	
Runs created	**202** (1922) Rogers Hornsby	192 (1948) Stan Musial *	185 (1925) Rogers Hornsby	183 (1924) Rogers Hornsby	167 Hornsby (1921) Medwick (1937), Musial * (1949)	
Extra base hits	**103** (1948) Stan Musial *	102 (1922) Rogers Hornsby	97 (1937) Joe Medwick	95 (1936) Joe Medwick	93 (1928) Jim Bottomley *	
Times on base	**321** (1949) Stan Musial *	319 (1948) Stan Musial *	318 (1924) Rogers Hornsby	316 (1922) Rogers Hornsby	311 (1953) Stan Musial *	
Hit by pitch	**20** (1952) Solly Hemus *	13 (1966) Orlando Cepeda	12 Orlando Cepeda (1967) Solly Hemus * (1953), George Watkins * (1933)			
Sacrifice hits	**37** Taylor Douthit (1926)	36 Harry Walker * (1943) Milt Stock (1921)		31 (1926) Les Bell	28 (1941) Marty Marion	
Sacrifice flies	**11** (1954) Ray Jablonski	9 Orlando Cepeda (1966) Red Schoendienst^{#} (1954), Bill Virdon * (1955)			6 tied with 8	
Double plays grounded into	**25** (1948) Nippy Jones	24 (1958) Gene Green	22 Ken Boyer (1964) Del Ennis (1957)		21 (1938) Joe Medwick	
Intentional bases on balls	**26** (1958) Stan Musial *	23 (1967) Orlando Cepeda	19 Tim McCarver * (1967) Stan Musial * (1955, 1957)			
At bats per strikeout	**61.70** (1927) Frankie Frisch^{#}	55.09 (1943) Jimmy Brown^{#}	55.00 (1934) Frankie Frisch^{#}	43.92 (1929) Frankie Frisch^{#}	43.71 (1927) Billy Southworth *	
Outs made	**512** (1967) Lou Brock *	511 (1947) Red Schoendienst^{#}	500 (1964) Curt Flood	496 (1950) Red Schoendienst^{#}	495 (1968) Lou Brock *	

Division play era single-season batting records (1969–present)
Category	Record	2nd place	3rd place	4th place	5th place	Refs
Batting average	**.363** (1971) Joe Torre	.359 (2003) Albert Pujols	.357 (2008) Albert Pujols	.353 (1985) Willie McGee^{#}	.344 (1979) Keith Hernandez *	
On-base percentage	**.483** (2000) Mark McGwire	.470 (1998) Mark McGwire	.462 (2008) Albert Pujols	.459 (1985) Jack Clark	.443 (2009) Albert Pujols	
Slugging percentage	**.752** (1998) Mark McGwire	.746 (2000) Mark McGwire	.697 (1999) Mark McGwire	.671 (2006) Albert Pujols	.667 (2003) Albert Pujols	
On-base plus slugging	**1.229** (2000) Mark McGwire	1.222 (1998) Mark McGwire	1.120 (1999) Mark McGwire	1.114 (2008) Albert Pujols	1.106 (2003) Albert Pujols	
Adjusted on-base plus slugging	**216** (1998) Mark McGwire	203 (2000) Mark McGwire	192 (2008) Albert Pujols	189 (2009) Albert Pujols	187 (2003) Albert Pujols	
Games played	**163** (1989) José Oquendo^{#}	162 Pedro Guerrero (1989), Terry Pendleton (1989)		8 tied with 161		
Plate appearances	**729** (1970) Lou Brock *	727 (1973) Lou Brock *	721 (1970) Lou Brock *	717 (2013) Matt Carpenter *	713 (2005) David Eckstein	
At bats	**672** (1979) Garry Templeton^{#}	664 (1970) Lou Brock *	655 (1969) Lou Brock *	650 (1973) Lou Brock *	647 (1978) Garry Templeton^{#}	
Runs	**137** (2003) Albert Pujols	133 (2004) Albert Pujols	130 (1998) Mark McGwire	129 Jim Edmonds * (2000), Albert Pujols (2005)		
Hits	**230** (1971) Joe Torre	216 (1985) Willie McGee^{#}	212 (2003) Albert Pujols	211 (1979) Garry Templeton^{#}	210 (1979) Keith Hernandez	
Total bases	**394** (2003) Albert Pujols	389 (2004) Albert Pujols	383 (1998) Mark McGwire	374 (2009) Albert Pujols	363 (1999) Mark McGwire	
Doubles	**55** (2013) Matt Carpenter *	51 Albert Pujols (2003, 2004)		49 (2003) Scott Rolen	48 Scott Rolen (2006), Keith Hernandez (1979)	
Triples	**19** (1979) Garry Templeton^{#}	18 Willie McGee^{#} (1985) Garry Templeton^{#} (1977)		15 (1991) Ray Lankford *	14 (1997) Delino DeShields *	
Home runs	**70** (1998) Mark McGwire	65 (1999) Mark McGwire	49 (2006) Albert Pujols	47 (2009) Albert Pujols	46 (2004) Albert Pujols	
RBI	**147** Mark McGwire (1998, 1999)		137 Albert Pujols (2006) Joe Torre (1971)		135 (2009) Albert Pujols	
Bases on balls	**162** (1998) Mark McGwire	136 (1987) Jack Clark	133 (1999) Mark McGwire	115 (2009) Albert Pujols	104 (2008) Albert Pujols	
Strikeouts	**167** (2000) Jim Edmonds *	162 (1997) Ron Gant	155 (1998) Mark McGwire	151 (1998) Ray Lankford *	150 (2004) Jim Edmonds *	
Stolen bases	**118** (1974) Lou Brock *	110 (1985) Vince Coleman^{#}	109 (1987) Vince Coleman^{#}	107 (1986) Vince Coleman^{#}	81 (1988) Vince Coleman^{#}	
Stolen base percentage	**91.18** (1985) Tom Herr^{#}	88.89 (2005) Albert Pujols	88.43 (1986) Vince Coleman^{#}	87.50 (2002) Eli Marrero	87.23 (1988) Willie McGee^{#}	
Runs created	**193** (1998) Mark McGwire	176 (2003) Albert Pujols	165 (2009) Albert Pujols	160 Mark McGwire (1999) Albert Pujols (2008)		
Extra base hits	**99** (2004) Albert Pujols	95 (2003) Albert Pujols	93 (2009) Albert Pujols	91 (1998) Mark McGwire	88 (2001) Albert Pujols	
Times on base	**323** (1998) Mark McGwire	314 (2009) Albert Pujols	307 (1971) Joe Torre	305 (2003) Albert Pujols	304 (2005) Albert Pujols	
Hit by pitch	**28** (2000) Fernando Viña *	22 (2001) Fernando Viña *	20 (2014) Jon Jay *	18 (2002) Fernando Viña *	17 (2014) Matt Holliday	
Sacrifice hits	**25** (1973) Ted Sizemore	21 (1975) Ted Sizemore	18 (1974) Ted Sizemore	16 (1986) Danny Cox	14 Bob Forsch (1982) Plácido Polanco (2001)	
Sacrifice flies	**14** (1982) George Hendrick	13 (1985) Tom Herr^{#}	12 Pedro Guerrero (1989), Tom Herr^{#} (1987), Keith Hernandez * (1982)			
Double plays grounded into	**31** (2013) Matt Holliday	29 Albert Pujols (2011) Ted Simmons^{#} (1973)		27 Yadier Molina (1999) Albert Pujols (2007)		
Intentional bases on balls	**44** (2009) Albert Pujols	38 (2010) Albert Pujols	34 (2008) Albert Pujols	26 Mark McGwire (1998) Albert Pujols (2006)		
At bats per strikeout	**30.28** (1993) Ozzie Smith^{#}	24.23 (1984) Ozzie Smith^{#}	22.56 (1971) Matty Alou *	19.89 (1985) Ozzie Smith^{#}	19.81 (1969) Tim McCarver *	
Outs made	**500** Vince Coleman^{#} (1985, 1988)		492 (1973) Lou Brock	491 (1970) Lou Brock	489 (1978) Garry Templeton^{#}	

=== Pitching ===
American Association single-season pitching records (1882–91)
Category	Record	2nd place	3rd place	4th place	5th place	Refs
ERA						
Adjusted ERA+						
Wins						
Losses						
Winning percentage						
Games played						
Innings pitched						
Complete games						
Shutouts						
Saves						
Games finished						
Hits allowed						
Runs allowed						
Earned runs allowed						
Strikeouts						
Bases on balls allowed						
Home runs allowed						
Hit batsmen						
Wild pitches						
Batters faced						
WHIP						
Strikeout to walk ratio						
Strikeouts per nine innings pitched						
Bases on balls per nine innings allowed						
Hits per nine innings allowed						
Home runs per nine innings allowed						

Early National League / "Dead-ball era" single-season pitching records (1892–1920)
Category	Record	2nd place	3rd place	4th place	5th place	Refs
ERA						
Adjusted ERA+						
Wins						
Losses						
Winning percentage						
Games played						
Innings pitched						
Complete games						
Shutouts						
Saves						
Games finished						
Hits allowed						
Runs allowed						
Earned runs allowed						
Strikeouts						
Bases on balls allowed						
Home runs allowed						
Hit batsmen						
Wild pitches						
Batters faced						
WHIP						
Strikeout to walk ratio						
Strikeouts per nine innings pitched						
Bases on balls per nine innings allowed						
Hits per nine innings allowed						
Home runs per nine innings allowed						

War era to early expansion era single-season pitching records (1921–68)
Category	Record	2nd place	3rd place	4th place	5th place	Refs
ERA						
Adjusted ERA+						
Wins						
Losses						
Winning percentage						
Games played						
Innings pitched						
Complete games						
Shutouts						
Saves						
Games finished						
Hits allowed						
Runs allowed						
Earned runs allowed						
Strikeouts						
Bases on balls allowed						
Home runs allowed						
Hit batsmen						
Wild pitches						
Batters faced						
WHIP						
Strikeout to walk ratio						
Strikeouts per nine innings pitched						
Bases on balls per nine innings allowed						
Hits per nine innings allowed						
Home runs per nine innings allowed						

Division play era single-season pitching records (1969–present)
Category	Record	2nd place	3rd place	4th place	5th place	Refs
ERA	**1.25** (2022) **Ryan Helsley**	1.54 (1984) Bruce Sutter	1.93 (1985) John Tudor *	2.08 (1986) Todd Worrell	2.16 (1992) Bob Tewksbury *	
Adjusted ERA+	**306** (2022) **Ryan Helsley**	227 (1984) Bruce Sutter	185 (1985) John Tudor *	182 (2009) Chris Carpenter	176 (1986) Todd Worrell	
Wins	**23** (1970) Bob Gibson	22 (2001) Matt Morris	21 Joaquín Andújar, John Tudor * (1985) Chris Carpenter (2005)			
Losses	**19** Steve Carlton * (1970) José DeLeón (1990)		17 Bob Forsch (1978), Joe Magrane * (1990), Eric Rasmussen (1977), Kip Wells (2007)			
Winning percentage	**.846** (1996) Mark Petkovsek	.842 (2012) Kyle Lohse	.833 (1987) John Tudor *	.813 (1975) Al Hrabosky	.810 (2009) Chris Carpenter	
Games played	**89** (2001) Steve Kline *	86 (2004) Ray King *	81 (2015) Kevin Siegrist *	78 Mitchell Boggs (2012) Steve Kline * (2003), Jason Motte (2011)		
Innings pitched	**314** (1969) Bob Gibson	294 (1970) Bob Gibson	278 (1972) Bob Gibson	275 (1985) John Tudor *	273.1 (1971) Steve Carlton *	
Complete games						
Shutouts						
Saves						
Games finished						
Hits allowed						
Runs allowed						
Earned runs allowed						
Strikeouts						
Bases on balls allowed						
Home runs allowed						
Hit batsmen						
Wild pitches						
Batters faced						
WHIP						
Strikeout to walk ratio						
Strikeouts per nine innings pitched						
Bases on balls per nine innings allowed						
Hits per nine innings allowed						
Home runs per nine innings allowed						

== Single-game individual records ==
Includes both regular season and postseason games.

=== Batting ===
All-time individual single-game batting records
Category	Record	2nd place	3rd place	4th place	5th place	Refs
Home runs	**4** (September 7, 1993) Mark Whiten^{#} vs CIN	3 – accomplished 19 times**				

**Johnny Mize (4×), Albert Pujols (4×), Mark McGwire (3×), Stan Musial (2×), Paul Goldschmidt, George Harper, Reggie Smith, George Watkins, Bill White, and Joshua Báez.

=== Pitching ===
All single-game, individual pitching records
Category	Record	2nd place	3rd place	4th place	5th place	Refs
Game score	**116** (April 29, 1936) Roy Parmelee; 17.0 IP vs NYG	106 (July 2, 1933) Tex Carleton; 16.0 IP vs NYG	104 (April 30, 1950) Harry Brecheen; 13.0 IP vs CHC	103 (August 30, 1989) José DeLeón; 11.0 IP vs CIN	102 (September 22, 1917) Lee Meadows; 14.0 IP vs BSN	
Innings pitched	**17.0** Dizzy Dean (July 1, 1934 vs CIN) Roy Parmelee (April 29, 1936 vs NYG)		16.1 Jesse Haines; Oct 1, 1920 vs CHC	16.0 Mort Cooper (Sep. 24, 1944 vs PHI) Tex Carleton (July 2, 1933 vs NYG)		

Nine-inning single-game, individual pitching records (1920–present)
Category	Record	2nd place	3rd place	4th place	5th place	Refs
Game score	**98** (May 10, 2013) Shelby Miller	97 (July 15, 1960) Ernie Broglio	96 (June 17, 1970) Bob Gibson	94 Chris Carpenter (2005); Matt Morris (2004) Bob Gibson (1971); Steve Carlton (1968)		
Strikeouts	**19** (May 19, 1969) Steve Carlton; 9.0 IP vs NYM	17 (July 30, 1933) Dizzy Dean; 9.0 IP vs CHC	16 Steve Carlton (September 20, 1967 vs PHI) & (May 21, 1970 vs PHI); Bob Gibson (May 23, 1970 vs PHI)			
Bases on balls						
Hits allowed						
Wild pitches						
Hit batsmen						

10 or more strikeouts in a postseason game
# of SO	Pitcher	Date	Event	Opponent	Outcome	Duration, decision	Ref
17	Bob Gibson	Oct. 2, 1968	World Series	Detroit Tigers	W, 4–0	CG ShO-9, W	
13	Bob Gibson	Oct. 12, 1964	World Series	New York Yankees	W, 5–2	CG-10, W	
12	Mort Cooper	Oct. 8, 1944	World Series	St. Louis Browns	W, 2–0	CG ShO-9, W	
10	Adam Wainwright	Oct. 28, 2013	World Series	Boston Red Sox	L, 1–3	GS-7, L	
10	Adam Wainwright	Oct. 7, 2012	NLDS	Washington Nationals	L, 2–3	GS-7	
10	Bob Gibson	Oct. 6, 1968	World Series	Detroit Tigers	W, 10–1	CG-9, W	
10	Bob Gibson	Oct. 12, 1967	World Series	Boston Red Sox	W, 7–2	CG-9, W	
10	Bob Gibson	Oct. 4, 1967	World Series	Boston Red Sox	W, 2–1	CG-9, W	
10	Pete Alexander	Oct. 3, 1926	World Series	New York Yankees	W, 6–2	CG-9, W	

Pitchers with nine SO in a postseason game: Andy Benes, Paul Derringer, Gibson (2×), Michael Wacha, Wainwright, Jeff Weaver, and Woody Williams.

== Fielding records ==
Cardinals career fielding leaders
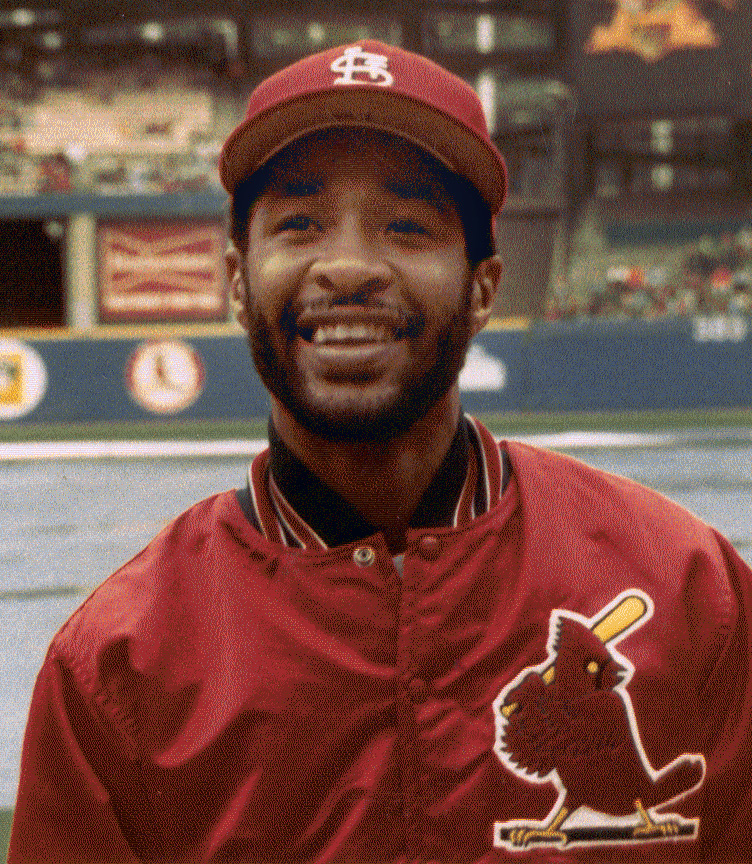
Ozzie Smith holds numerous career fielding records for Cardinals shortstops.

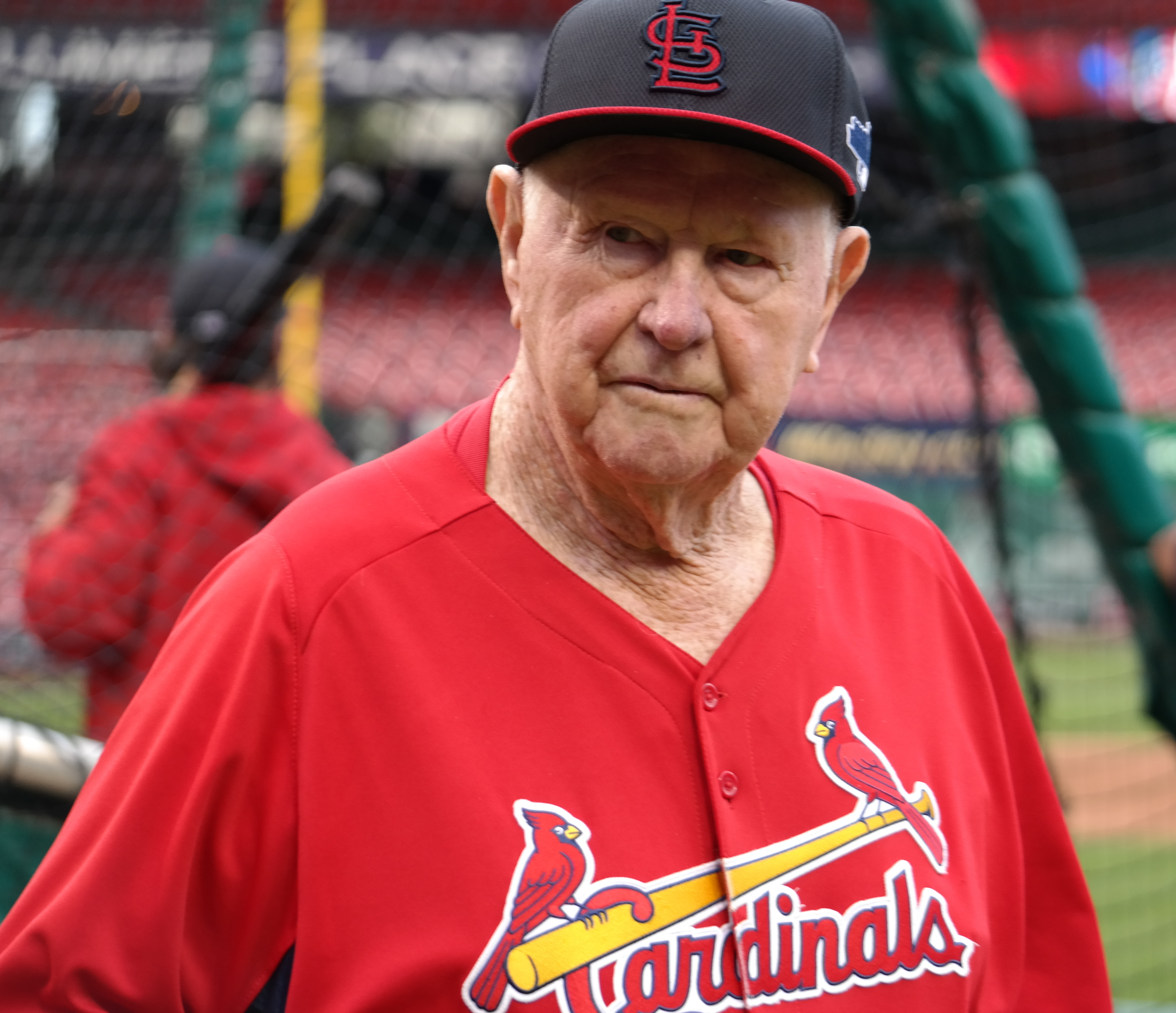
Red Schoendienst leads Cardinals second basemen in three career categories.

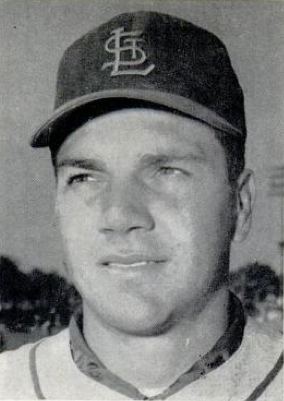
Ken Boyer leads Cardinals third basemen in four career categories.

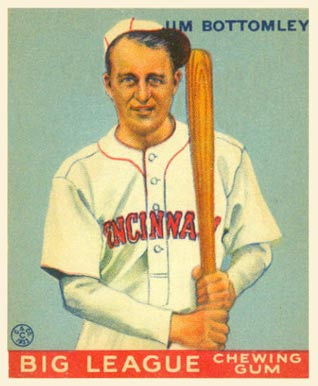
Jim Bottomley leads Cardinals first basemen in putouts and games played and is second in double plays.

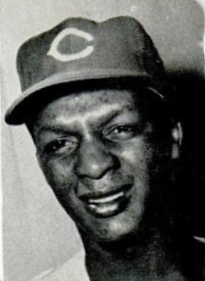
Curt Flood ranks first among Cardinal outfielders in putouts and fourth in double plays and games played.

Note: 2,000 innings minimum for position players' fielding percentage; 500 innings for pitchers.

Catchers
Category	Record	2nd place	3rd place	4th place	5th place	Ref
Games caught	**2,184** Yadier Molina	1,439 Ted Simmons	1,018 Del Rice	960 Tim McCarver	827 Tom Pagnozzi	
Innings	**18,294.2** Yadier Molina	12,335 Ted Simmons	8,158.1 Tim McCarver	6,672.1 Tom Pagnozzi	4,938 Mike Matheny	
Putouts	**15,122** Yadier Molina	7460 Ted Simmons	5740 Tim McCarver	4311 Del Rice	4124 Tom Pagnozzi	
Assists	**1,062** Yadier Molina	757 Frank Snyder	755 Ted Simmons	498 Mike González	455 Del Rice	
Double plays	**137** Yadier Molina	87 Ted Simmons	77 Jimmie Wilson	63 Del Rice	54 Mike González, Tim McCarver	
Stolen bases	**920** Ted Simmons	565 Yadier Molina	496 Tom Pagnozzi	357 Tim McCarver	334 Darrell Porter	
Caught stealing	**486** Ted Simmons	381 Yadier Molina	293 Tom Pagnozzi	207 Tim McCarver	184 Darrell Porter	
Fielding percentage	**.996** Mike Matheny	.995 Yadier Molina	.993 Tony Peña	.992 Tom Pagnozzi	.990 Tim McCarver	
Errors	**151** Jack Boyle	111 Doc Bushong	104 Ted Simmons	83 Yadier Molina	75 Pat Deasley, Ivey Wingo	
Passed balls	**193** Jack Boyle	182 Doc Bushong	163 Ted Simmons	101 Sleeper Sullivan	98 Jocko Milligan	
Wild pitches	**549** Yadier Molina	439 Ted Simmons	209 Tim McCarver	185 Tom Pagnozzi	136 Mike Matheny	

First basemen
Category	Record	2nd place	3rd place	4th place	5th place	Ref
Games played	**1,357** Albert Pujols	1,340 Jim Bottomley	1,118 Keith Hernandez	1,016 Stan Musial	1,010 Charles Comiskey	
Innings	**11,462.1** Albert Pujols	9,590 Keith Hernandez	8,146.1 Bill White	4,339.1 Mark McGwire	3,911 Stan Musial	
Putouts	**13,160** Jim Bottomley	12,130 Albert Pujols	10,572 Keith Hernandez	10,259 Charles Comiskey	10,091 Ed Konetchy	
Assists	**1,166** Albert Pujols	879 Keith Hernandez	688 Stan Musial	640 Ed Konetchy	610 Bill White	
Double plays	**1,241** Albert Pujols	1,151 Jim Bottomley	991 Keith Hernandez	935 Stan Musial	752 Bill White	
Fielding percentage	**.998** **Paul Goldschmidt**	.997 Tino Martinez	.994 Keith Hernandez, John Mabry, Albert Pujols			
Errors	**314** Charles Comiskey	174 Jim Bottomley	126 Ed Konetchy	79 Johnny Mize, Albert Pujols		

Second basemen
Category	Record	2nd place	3rd place	4th place	5th place	Ref
Games played	**1,547** Julián Javier	1,429 Red Schoendienst	1,140 Frankie Frisch	997 Rogers Hornsby	987 Tom Herr	
Innings	**12,939.1** Julián Javier	8,405 Tom Herr	6,281 Kolten Wong	5,270 Ted Sizemore	4,975 José Oquendo	
Putouts	**3,684** Red Schoendienst	3,377 Julián Javier	2,879 Frankie Frisch	2,144 Rogers Hornsby	2,122 Tom Herr	
Assists	**4,130** Red Schoendienst	4,107 Julián Javier	3,807 Frankie Frisch	3,263 Rogers Hornsby	2,892 Tom Herr	
Double plays	**1,092** Red Schoendienst	907 Julián Javier	730 Tom Herr	709 Frankie Frisch	554 Rogers Hornsby	
Fielding percentage	**.992** José Oquendo	.990 **Tommy Edman**	.988 Tom Herr	.985 Ken Oberkfell	.984 Fernando Viña	
Errors	**322** Yank Robinson	219 Julián Javier	207 Rogers Hornsby	170 Frankie Frisch	161 Miller Huggins	

Third basemen
Category	Record	2nd place	3rd place	4th place	5th place	Ref
Games played	**1,539** Ken Boyer	1,081 Ken Reitz	908 Terry Pendleton	868 Whitey Kurowski	839 Arlie Latham	
Innings	**12,306.2** Ken Boyer	9,182.1 Ken Reitz	7,884 Terry Pendleton	5,689.2 Scott Rolen	5,367.2 Matt Carpenter	
Putouts	**1,373** Ken Boyer	1,056 Arlie Latham	1,025 Whitey Kurowski	799 Ken Reitz	717 Terry Pendleton	
Assists	**3,149** Ken Boyer	2,135 Terry Pendleton	2,011 Ken Reitz	1,898 Arlie Latham	1,569 Whitey Kurowski	
Double plays	**306** Ken Boyer	176 Ken Reitz	155 Terry Pendleton	137 Whitey Kurowski	135 Scott Rolen	
Fielding percentage	**.977** Gary Gaetti	.971 Ken Reitz	.971 **Nolan Arenado**	.968 Scott Rolen	.964 Andy High, Ken Oberkfell	
Errors	**456** Arlie Latham	225 Ken Boyer	123 Terry Pendleton	119 Bobby Byrne	116 Whitey Kurowski	

Shortstops
Category	Record	2nd place	3rd place	4th place	5th place	Ref
Games played	**1,929** Ozzie Smith	1,484 Marty Marion	1,054 Dal Maxvill	891 Édgar Rentería	700 Garry Templeton	
Innings	**16,735** Ozzie Smith	8,075 Dal Maxvill	7,631.1 Édgar Rentería	6,023.2 Garry Templeton	4,903.2 **Paul DeJong**	
Putouts	**3,221** Ozzie Smith	2,881 Marty Marion	1,595 Dal Maxvill	1,450 Leo Durocher	1,356 Garry Templeton	
Assists	**6,229** Ozzie Smith	4,691 Marty Marion	3,050 Dal Maxvill	2,432 Édgar Rentería	2,396 Garry Templeton	
Double plays	**1,221** Ozzie Smith	937 Marty Marion	575 Dal Maxvill	499 Édgar Rentería	488 Garry Templeton	
Fielding percentage	**.984** Jhonny Peralta	.980 **Paul DeJong**, Ozzie Smith		.979 Brendan Ryan	.977 David Eckstein	
Errors	**437** Bill Gleason	247 Marty Marion	238 Shorty Fuller	196 Ozzie Smith	185 Doc Lavan	

Outfielders, 1–5
Category	Record	2nd place	3rd place	4th place	5th place	Ref
Games played	**2,218** Lou Brock	1,896 Stan Musial	1,751 Enos Slaughter	1,687 Curt Flood	1,502 Willie McGee	
Innings	**18,913** Lou Brock	14,083.1 Curt Flood	12,378.1 Ray Lankford	11,850.1 Willie McGee	8,622.2 Jim Edmonds	
Putouts	**4,005** Curt Flood	3,791 Lou Brock	3,725 Stan Musial	3,457 Enos Slaughter	3,374 Ray Lankford	
Assists	**142** Enos Slaughter	129 Stan Musial	125 Tommy McCarthy	123 Hugh Nicol	122 Jack Smith	
Double plays	**42** Jack Smith	33 Tommy McCarthy, Enos Slaughter		28 Curt Flood	27 Stan Musial	
Fielding percentage	**.995** Jon Jay	.994 Ryan Ludwick	.993 Tito Landrum	.991 Chuck Diering	.990 Tommy Pham	
Errors	**173** Lou Brock	131 Tip O'Neill	96 Tommy McCarthy	90 Jack Smith	85 Willie McGee	

Outfielders, 6–10
Category	6th place	7th place	8th place	9th place	10th place	Ref
Games played	1,492 Ray Lankford	1,189 Terry Moore	1,161 Joe Medwick	1,048 Jim Edmonds	1,014 Jack Smith	
Innings	7,756 Matt Holliday	7,500.2 Vince Coleman	6,771.2 George Hendrick	5,353.2 Jon Jay	5,038 Brian Jordan	
Putouts	3,288 Willie McGee	3,117 Terry Moore	2,535 Taylor Douthit	2,531 Joe Medwick	2,442 Jim Edmonds	
Assists	109 Lou Brock	105 Curt Flood	102 Terry Moore	91 Willie McGee	88 Joe Medwick	
Double plays	24 Homer Smoot	23 Patsy Donovan, Terry Moore		21 Tommy Dowd, Rube Ellis		
Fielding percentage	.988 George Hendrick, Matt Holliday, Bake McBride, Tony Scott				.987 Jim Edmonds, Curt Flood, Brian Jordan	
Errors	82 Tommy Dowd	80 Hugh Nicol	79 Taylor Douthit	74 Enos Slaughter	73 Jesse Burkett	

Outfielders, 11–15
Category	11th place	12th place	13th place	14th place	15th place	Ref
Games played	919 Matt Holliday	879 Vince Coleman	835 Taylor Douthit	828 George Hendrick	771 Tip O'Neill	
Innings	4,603.1 Bernard Gilkey	4,304 J. D. Drew	3,791.1 Tony Scott	3,551.2 Lonnie Smith	3,468.2 Ryan Ludwick	
Putouts	1,989 Jack Smith	1,660 Vince Coleman	1,557 George Hendrick	1,493 Chick Hafey	1,420 Jon Jay	
Assists	84 Rube Ellis	81 Steve Evans, Austin McHenry		78 Patsy Donovan	73 Chick Hafey, Curt Welch	
Double plays	20 Steve Evans, Willie McGee		19 Lou Brock	18 Joe Medwick, Rebel Oakes		
Fielding percentage	(see position 10)		.986 Carlos Beltrán, Randal Grichuk, John Mabry, Skip Schumaker, Mike Shannon			
Errors	70 Rube Ellis	64 Joe Medwick, Stan Musial, Rebel Oakes, Homer Smoot				

Pitchers
Category	Record	2nd place	3rd place	4th place	5th place	Ref
Putouts	**291** Bob Gibson	228 **Adam Wainwright**	220 Bob Forsch	188 Ted Breitenstein	143 Dave Foutz	
Assists	**808** Bill Doak	650 Jesse Haines	498 Bill Sherdel	484 Bob Gibson	479 Slim Sallee	
Double plays	**46** Bob Gibson	34 Bob Forsch	32 Jesse Haines	28 **Adam Wainwright**	24 Bill Doak, Howie Pollet	
Fielding percentage	**.990** Kyle Lohse	.989 Garrett Stephenson	.986 Grover Cleveland Alexander	.985 Lon Warneke	.983 Rick Wise	
Errors	**54** Jumbo McGinnis	44 Ted Breitenstein	42 Bob Gibson	38 Bill Doak	35 Dave Foutz	

== See also ==
- Major League Baseball titles leaders
- List of Major League Baseball individual streaks
- Baseball statistics
