= Douthit =

Douthit is a surname. Notable people with the surname include:

- Marcus Douthit (born 1980), American-Filipino basketball player
- Taylor Douthit (1901–1986), Major League Baseball outfielder
