= Jumbo McGinnis =

American baseball player (died 1934)

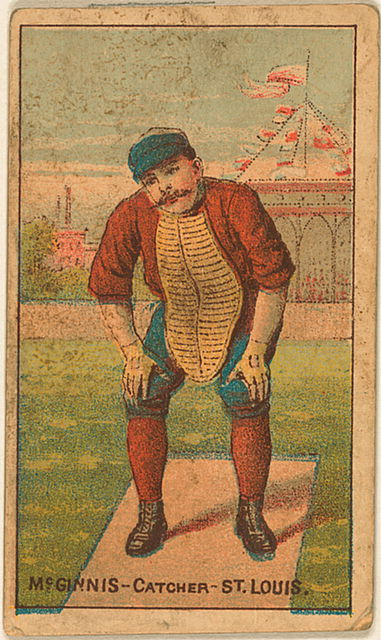
- McGinnis erroneously depicted on an 1887 baseball card as a catcher
- Pitcher
- Born: Date unknown Place uncertain (likely Alton, Illinois, U.S.)
- Died: May 18, 1934; St. Louis, Missouri, U.S.
- Batted: Unknown Threw: Unknown

MLB debut
- May 2, 1882, for the St. Louis Brown Stockings

Last MLB appearance
- June 10, 1887, for the Cincinnati Red Stockings

MLB statistics
- Win–loss record: 102–79
- Earned run average: 2.95
- Strikeouts: 562
- Stats at Baseball Reference

Teams
- St. Louis Brown Stockings/Browns (1882–1886); Baltimore Orioles (1886); Cincinnati Red Stockings (1887)

George Washington McGinnis (c. 1850s – May 18, 1934) was an American pitcher whose Major League Baseball career spanned from 1882 to 1887. Nicknamed "Jumbo" for his heavy, robust frame, McGinnis is considered the first ace of the storied franchise that would later become known as the St. Louis Cardinals.

== Birthdate ==
McGinnis's actual birthdate is unknown and has been the subject of some debate and speculation by baseball historians. Records are inconsistent, and different sources list it as February 22, 1854, sometime in 1856, 1858 (according to his gravestone), or as late as February 22, 1864 (found on his death certificate)— although the latter date is unlikely, since it would mean that he made his pitching debut in the American Association at the age of 18.

== Career ==
McGinnis started his professional baseball career with the St. Louis Brown Stockings (or Browns) of the American Association and was one of their top pitchers. From 1882 to 1884, he pitched over 300 innings and won over 20 games each year. After the team acquired Bob Caruthers and Dave Foutz, however, McGinnis' role on the Browns' pitching staff was greatly reduced. He later played for the Baltimore Orioles and Cincinnati Red Stockings. After his retirement, he also occasionally worked as an umpire in the Major Leagues. His achievements as a pitcher include leading the circuit in shutouts (with 6) in 1883.

Outside of baseball, McGinnis worked as a glassblower. He died of stomach cancer in St. Louis, Missouri in 1934.

== See also ==
- List of Major League Baseball annual shutout leaders
- List of Major League Baseball career WHIP leaders
- List of St. Louis Cardinals team records
