= Tom Herr =

American baseball player (born 1956)

- Herr with the St. Louis Cardinals in 1983
- Second baseman
- Born: April 4, 1956 (age 70); Lancaster, Pennsylvania, U.S.
- Batted: Switch Threw: Right

MLB debut
- August 13, 1979, for the St. Louis Cardinals

Last MLB appearance
- October 4, 1991, for the San Francisco Giants

MLB statistics
- Batting average: .271
- Home runs: 28
- Runs batted in: 574
- Stats at Baseball Reference

Teams
- St. Louis Cardinals (1979–1988); Minnesota Twins (1988); Philadelphia Phillies (1989–1990); New York Mets (1990–1991); San Francisco Giants (1991)

Career highlights and awards
- All-Star (1985); World Series champion (1982); St. Louis Cardinals Hall of Fame

Thomas Mitchell Herr (born April 4, 1956) is an American former professional baseball second baseman. He played 13 seasons in Major League Baseball (MLB) for the St. Louis Cardinals, Minnesota Twins, Philadelphia Phillies, New York Mets, and San Francisco Giants. Although he never won a Gold Glove Award, Herr retired with the highest all-time career fielding percentage for National League second basemen (.989), a figure that was matched and surpassed a few years later when Hall of Famer Ryne Sandberg retired.

== Playing career ==
Herr started his minor league career with the Johnson City Cardinals in 1975. Two years later, he led the league with 156 hits, 80 runs, 50 stolen bases, and 515 at-bats while playing for St. Petersburg. Herr played in the 1982, 1985, and 1987 World Series – all with the Cardinals, finishing fifth in the MVP voting and making his only appearance in the All-Star Game in 1985. During the 1985 season, he set career highs in nearly every statistical category, including 110 RBIs which came along with only 8 home runs. A rare feat in the modern era of baseball, Herr remains the last NL player to drive in 100 or more runs in a season while hitting fewer than 10 home runs. Paul Molitor is the most recent AL and MLB player to drive in 100 or more runs in a season while hitting fewer than 10 home runs (9 home runs, 113 RBI in 1996). Early in the 1988 season he was traded to the Twins for Tom Brunansky.

In a 13-season career, he batted .271 with 28 home runs and 574 RBIs in 1,514 games. He had 1,450 career hits in 5,349 at bats. An excellent second baseman, Herr recorded a career .989 fielding percentage. He is perhaps best remembered for hitting a walk-off grand slam in extra innings against the New York Mets on April 18, 1987. After Herr hit the grand slam many fans at Busch Stadium threw their stadium give-away seat cushions onto the field in celebration. The grand slam is also well known for Jack Buck's memorable call on KMOX radio.

== Management career ==
Herr was hired in November 2004 as the first manager of his hometown Lancaster Barnstormers, a team in the independent Atlantic League of Professional Baseball, and led the team to the 2006 Atlantic League championship. His success in Lancaster piqued the interest of the Washington Nationals, resulting in a managerial position with the Single-A Hagerstown Suns for the 2007 season. The Suns finished last in the Southern Atlantic League in 2007 with a 55–81 record. Following the 2007 season, Herr left the Nationals organization after his request to manage their Double-A affiliate, the Harrisburg Senators, was refused. After leaving the Nationals, he sought employment with other major league organizations, including the St. Louis Cardinals, without success. Herr then sought to return to the Barnstormers as their manager for the 2008 season, but lost out to Von Hayes. In December 2008, the Barnstormers announced that Hayes has hired Herr to be his bench coach in 2009.

== Family ==
Herr's son, Aaron, played professional baseball.

== See also ==
- List of St. Louis Cardinals team records
- List of Major League Baseball career stolen bases leaders
