= Ray Lankford =

American baseball player (born 1967)

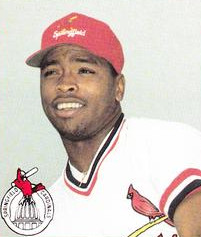
- Lankford in 1988
- Outfielder
- Born: June 5, 1967 (age 59); Los Angeles, California, U.S.
- Batted: Left Threw: Left

MLB debut
- August 21, 1990, for the St. Louis Cardinals

Last MLB appearance
- October 3, 2004, for the St. Louis Cardinals

MLB statistics
- Batting average: .272
- Home runs: 238
- Runs batted in: 874
- Stats at Baseball Reference

Teams
- St. Louis Cardinals (1990–2001); San Diego Padres (2001–2002); St. Louis Cardinals (2004)

Career highlights and awards
- All-Star (1997); St. Louis Cardinals Hall of Fame

Raymond Lewis Lankford (born June 5, 1967) is an American former professional baseball outfielder. He played 14 seasons in Major League Baseball (MLB) for the St. Louis Cardinals and San Diego Padres. He was known for his combination of power, speed, and defensive prowess.

== Early years ==
Lankford was born in Los Angeles and grew up in Modesto, California, where he attended Grace M. Davis High School and played baseball and football. He later played baseball and football at Modesto Junior College. Lankford's uncle, Carl Nichols, was a professional baseball player and spent parts of six seasons in the major leagues.

== Career ==
Lankford made his major league debut with St. Louis in August 1990, and soon after took over the center field position previously occupied by former National League MVP Willie McGee. He started his career as primarily a leadoff man, where his speed and plate discipline made him a potent force. In his first full season in 1991, he led the league with 15 triples, stole 44 bases, and scored 83 runs, earning him a third-place finish in NL Rookie of the Year voting. On September 15, 1991, he accomplished the rare feat of hitting for the cycle, becoming the first Cardinal rookie ever to do so. In 1992, he began to hit for more power, and posted a breakout season with a .293 batting average, 20 home runs, and 42 stolen bases. This season established Lankford as one of the best all-around outfielders in the game. He eventually moved down in the batting order to take further advantage of his power hitting ability.

Lankford posted five seasons of 20 home runs and 20 stolen bases with the Cardinals (1992, 1995–1998), making him the only player in franchise history to accomplish the feat more than once. He also was an impressive fielder, posting a 2.90 range factor in 1992 and committing only one error in 1996. In the latter season, he led the league with a fielding percentage of .997 but was not awarded a Gold Glove.

On April 3, 1994, Lankford achieved an unusual distinction: he hit a home run as the first batter of the season (it was the first day of the season, and only one game was played that day).

He was selected as the starting center fielder for the National League in the 1997 All-Star Game after a dominating hitting performance in the first half of the season, and posted an offensive career year the following season. In 1998, he hit .293 with 31 home runs, 105 runs batted in and 26 stolen bases. It was his late season surge batting cleanup that helped Mark McGwire, hitting in front of Lankford in the Cardinal order, to set the single season home run record with 70. Following the 1998 season, Lankford had knee surgery and was moved to left field. In his first year at the position, he posted a career high .306 batting average and 15 home runs in an injury-shortened season. He also compiled impressive defensive statistics at his new position.

Lankford was traded from St. Louis to San Diego during the 2001 season for pitcher Woody Williams. Criticism of his always high strikeout totals helped prompt the trade, even though he had continued to be more productive statistically than many of the other outfielders receiving playing time in St. Louis, including journeyman utility player Craig Paquette and rookie Kerry Robinson. At the time of the trade, Lankford was slugging an impressive .496 and maintaining a .345 on-base percentage despite a disappointing batting mark of .235. His numbers, though, had declined as he increasingly found himself in a bench role as the season progressed. He responded to the trade well, however, batting .288 for the balance of the season for San Diego under the tutelage of eight-time batting champion Tony Gwynn.

He returned to the Padres for 2002, but his lone full season in San Diego was marred by injury and inconsistency, as he appeared in only 81 games and batted a career low .221. He took the 2003 season off to continue his recovery process before returning to St. Louis, where he finished his career in 2004. Once again he saw his playing time dip late in the season after the Cardinals acquired Larry Walker from the Colorado Rockies in late August. He was not placed on the postseason roster in 2004, but earned a National League championship ring for his role in the Cardinals' first pennant-winning season since 1987.

Lankford finished his career among the Cardinal Top 10 in numerous statistical categories, including home runs (third), stolen bases (fifth), runs scored (eighth), runs batted in (eighth), and bases on balls (fourth). Lankford hit more home runs at Busch Stadium (123) than any other player, and finished his career in his home ballpark with a pinch hit home run in his final major league at bat on October 3, 2004. He is the only player to have 200 home runs and 200 stolen bases as a Cardinal. He participated in festivities commemorating the final season at Busch Stadium in 2005, including taking down his signature jersey number 16 from a banner counting down the remaining games at the ballpark and accepting a nomination for the All-Time Busch Stadium Team. He also indicated he is interested in making a return to baseball in the future.

On January 31, 2018, the St. Louis Cardinals nominated Lankford, alongside Vince Coleman, Keith Hernandez, Jason Isringhausen, Scott Rolen, Lee Smith, and John Tudor as the seven players for possible induction into the St. Louis Cardinals Hall of Fame. On May 4, once the fan votes were tallied, Ray Lankford and Vince Coleman were enshrined into the St. Louis Cardinals 2018 class.

== Career statistics ==
Games	PA	AB	R	H	2B	3B	HR	RBI	SB	BB	SO	AVG	OBP	SLG	FLD%
1701	6675	5747	968	1561	356	54	238	874	258	828	1550	.272	.364	.477	.983

== See also ==
- List of Major League Baseball annual triples leaders
- List of Major League Baseball career home run leaders
- List of Major League Baseball career games played as a center fielder leaders
- List of Major League Baseball career putouts as a center fielder leaders
- List of Major League Baseball players to hit for the cycle
- List of St. Louis Cardinals team records

Achievements
Preceded by Dave Winfield	Hitting for the cycle September 15, 1991	Succeeded by Andújar Cedeño
