= Bill Sherdel =

American baseball player (1896–1968)

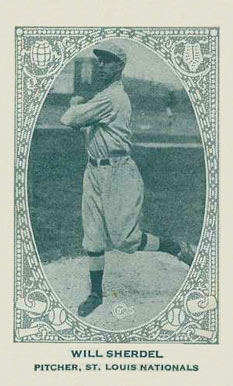
- Pitcher
- Born: August 15, 1896; McSherrystown, Pennsylvania, U.S.
- Died: November 14, 1968 (aged 72); McSherrystown, Pennsylvania, U.S.
- Batted: Left Threw: Left

MLB debut
- April 22, 1918, for the St. Louis Cardinals

Last MLB appearance
- June 11, 1932, for the St. Louis Cardinals

MLB statistics
- Win–loss record: 165–146
- Earned run average: 3.72
- Strikeouts: 839
- Stats at Baseball Reference

Teams
- St. Louis Cardinals (1918–1930); Boston Braves (1930–1932); St. Louis Cardinals (1932)

Career highlights and awards
- World Series champion (1926); St. Louis Cardinals Hall of Fame

William Henry Sherdel (August 15, 1896 – November 14, 1968) was an American professional baseball pitcher. He played 15 seasons in Major League Baseball (MLB) for the St. Louis Cardinals and Boston Braves from 1918 to 1932. For his career, he compiled a 165–146 record in 514 appearances, with a 3.72 earned run average and 839 strikeouts. In Cardinals franchise history, Sherdel ranks fifth all-time in wins (153), fourth in games pitched (465), sixth in games started (243), seventh in complete games (145), and fifth in innings pitched (2450.2). He won the 1926 World Series with the Cardinals and was elected to the St. Louis Cardinals Hall of Fame in 2026.

== Early life ==
Sherdel was born in McSherrystown, Pennsylvania, on August 15, 1896.

== Career ==
Sherdel in 1925 Exhibit card for St. Louis Cardinals

Sherdel's 153 wins are the most ever for a Cardinals left-hander. Sherdel achieved the unusual distinction of giving up at least 10 runs in three consecutive starts during the 1929 season — 10 runs on June 29, 13 runs on July 3 and 10 runs on July 6.

Sherdel was a member of two National League pennant-winning Cardinals teams, in 1926 and 1928, winning the World Series in 1926. He faced the New York Yankees both times. During World Series play, he compiled a 0–4 record in four appearances, with a 3.26 earned run average and six strikeouts.

Sherdel was an above-average hitting pitcher during his 15-year major league career. He posted a .223 batting average (214-for-960) scoring 96 runs, with 35 doubles, five triples, nine home runs, 86 RBI, drawing 63 bases on balls.

He was occasionally used as a pinch hitter, and played a few games at both right field and first base.

== Death ==
Sherdel was taken to Hanover General Hospital in Hanover, Pennsylvania on October 22, 1968. He would be released on November 6. Sherdel died at his home in McSherrystown, Pennsylvania on November 14, 1968 after an extended illness at age 72.

== See also ==
- List of St. Louis Cardinals team records
- List of Major League Baseball annual saves leaders
