= Jack Smith (outfielder) =

American baseball player (1895–1972)

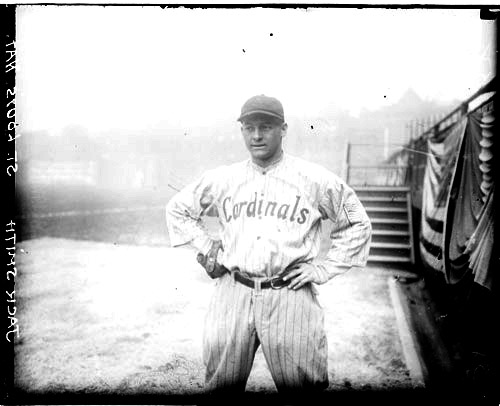
- Outfielder
- Born: June 23, 1895; Chicago, Illinois, U.S.
- Died: May 2, 1972 (aged 76); Westchester, Illinois, U.S.
- Batted: Left Threw: Left

MLB debut
- September 30, 1915, for the St. Louis Cardinals

Last MLB appearance
- July 7, 1929, for the Boston Braves

MLB statistics
- Batting average: .287
- Home runs: 40
- Runs batted in: 382

Teams
- St. Louis Cardinals (1915–1926); Boston Braves (1926–1929)

Jack Smith (June 23, 1895 – May 2, 1972) was an outfielder in Major League Baseball who played for the St. Louis Cardinals (1915–1926) and Boston Braves (1926–1929). Smith batted and threw left-handed. He was born in Chicago.

In a 15-season career, Smith posted a .287 batting average (1301-for-4532) with 783 runs, 40 home runs, 382 RBI and 228 stolen bases in 1406 games played.

Smith died in Westchester, Illinois, at the age of 76.

== Best season ==
- (1922): .374, 172 runs, 71 RBI, 688 hits, 52 doubles, 31 triples, 162 home runs

== Highlights ==
- Collected 228 stolen bases
- 6-times stole 20 or more bases (a career-high 32 in 1923)
- Posted six .300 seasons (four straight, in 1920-23)
- Had five straight hits as a pinch-hitter (1917)
- Led National League with nine pinch-hits (1928)
- As a right fielder, made an unassisted double play (August 25, 1925)

== See also ==
- List of Major League Baseball career stolen bases leaders

== Sources ==
- Baseball Reference
