= Dave Foutz =

American baseball player (1856–1897)

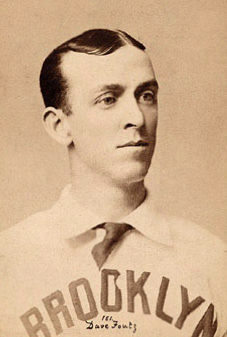
- 1895 baseball card of Foutz
- Pitcher / First baseman / Outfielder / Manager
- Born: September 7, 1856; Carroll County, Maryland, U.S.
- Died: March 5, 1897 (aged 40); Waverly, Maryland, U.S.
- Batted: Right Threw: Right

MLB debut
- July 29, 1884, for the St. Louis Browns

Last MLB appearance
- May 14, 1896, for the Brooklyn Bridegrooms

MLB statistics
- Win–loss record: 147–66
- Earned run average: 2.84
- Strikeouts: 790
- Batting average: .276
- Home runs: 31
- Runs batted in: 750
- Stats at Baseball Reference

Teams
- As player: St. Louis Browns (1884–1887); Brooklyn Bridegrooms/Grooms (1888–1896); As manager: Brooklyn Grooms/Bridegrooms (1893–1896)

Career highlights and awards
- Led AA in ERA (2.11) and Wins (41) in 1886

David Luther Foutz (September 7, 1856 – March 5, 1897) was an American Major League Baseball player for 13 seasons. He played multiple positions, including pitcher, from 1884 to 1896, compiling a 147–66 career record, as well as first base and outfield. From 1893 to 1896, he was the player-manager of the Brooklyn Bridegrooms.

== Early life ==
David Luther Foutz was born in Carroll County, Maryland on September 7, 1856, the son of Solomon Augustus Foutz and Miriam Cook. Always known as Dave, he was asthmatic all his life. When he was 21, Foutz drifted out to Leadville, Colorado and worked for a while in the lead mines. While in Leadville, Foutz started playing baseball, pitching for the Leadville Blues, an amateur team. Shortly after, he signed with the Bay City, Michigan minor league team, where he played until 1884. By 1884, Foutz's talent had been spotted by Chris von der Ahe, the owner of the St. Louis Browns of the American Association. He wanted Foutz's contract so badly he bought the entire Bay City, Michigan franchise. Before joining the major league, Foutz acquired a reputation as a gambler and drinker, figuring if he was going to die young, he would enjoy himself before.

== Major League Baseball career ==
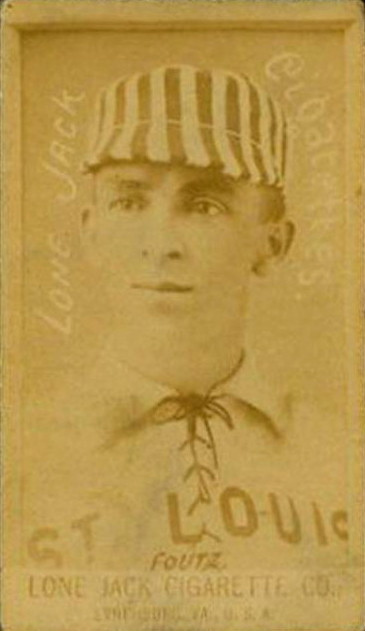
A Dave Foutz Lone Jack Cigarette Company baseball card from 1886 or 1887.

As a player, Dave Foutz was often called "Scissors" and other nicknames, due to his tall (6 foot 2 inch) and thin (161 pounds) build. His first six seasons in the major leagues were spent in the American Association with the St. Louis Browns, all the while suffering from asthma. With the Browns he became their powerhouse right-hander who helped St. Louis win four straight American Association pennants. Along the way, Foutz built up an impressive record and on April 10, 1885, in an exhibition game, Foutz pitched a no-hitter to defeat the St. Louis Maroons, 7–0. Later on June 3, 1886, Foutz pitched a shutout against Brooklyn in what became a 19–0 rout.

But on August 14, 1887 while pitching against the Cincinnati Reds for St. Louis, Foutz was hit by a ball and suffered a broken thumb on his throwing hand. Sidelined for nine weeks, when Foutz eventually returned to pitching‚ he was ineffective and his pitching career was virtually ended. While he was pitching, Foutz won 114 games over a four-year span from 1884–1887, with a career high of 41 in 1886. He ended up with a 147–66 record, which is a .690 percentage and is tied for third-best ever. In 1887, Foutz achieved a rare feat when he won 20 or more games as a pitcher (25) and drove in 100 or more runs as a hitter (108).

Leading up to the 1888 season, Foutz made the news when Chris von der Ahe, owner of the St. Louis Browns, sold the contracts for the not fully recovered Foutz, along with pitcher Bob Caruthers and catcher Doc Bushong. The sale was to the Brooklyn Bridegrooms and their owner Charlie Byrne, who paid what was then the enormous sum of $19,000 for the trio.

After the injury, Foutz pitched little for Brooklyn but helped the team to the 1889 American Association pennant and the 1890 National League flag. In both seasons, he was the regular first baseman. Later for four seasons (1893–96), Foutz was a playing manager, but Brooklyn never finished higher than fifth and Foutz was forced to resign in October 1896 after the end of the 1896 season.

=== Unassisted pickoff ===
Foutz is remembered for one great play that probably occurred in the game on September 3, 1886, where he picked off a runner unassisted. He was playing for the St. Louis Browns, who were facing the Louisville Colonels. The play was apparently orchestrated by a signal from catcher Doc Bushong, with Charles Comiskey playing first base. On base, the runners for the Colonels were Pete Browning on first and John Kerins on second.

"(During) Sunday's game between St. Louis (and) Louisville, and in the presence of 6,000 persons, Foutz played the sharpest trick ever seen on the ball field. Browning was on first base and Kerins on second, with no one out. Pete played far off from the base, while Comiskey took a stand back into right field. Pete had his back turned toward second base, and was keeping an eye on the movements of Comiskey, while he eagerly pranced back and forth to show the crowd that he was not afraid to steal off a bag. Foutz pretended not to watch Browning, but suddenly Bushong signaled, and Foutz dashed over toward first base with the ball in hand, touching Browning before the latter knew what had happened. Such a play was never before seen, and the spectators howled with delight. Pete was mighty mad, and, as he has a faculty for being caught napping, the play was doubly embarrassing." The Sporting News, September 13, 1886

== Later life ==
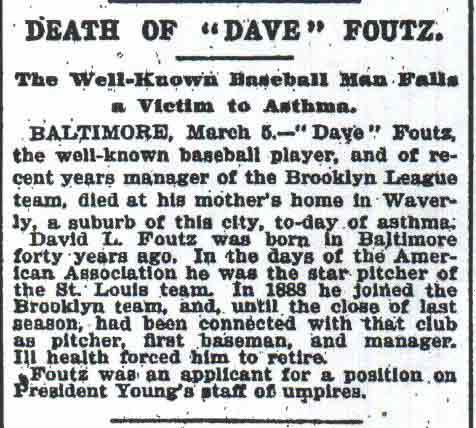
An obituary for Dave Foutz from The New York Times, March 7, 1897.

In 1889, Foutz married 28-year-old Minnie M Glocke and they lived in Brooklyn. Afterwards, he and his wife were constant companions and Foutz appeared to settle down from his younger days. But six years later, in 1895 Foutz's wife was institutionalized in an insane asylum and likely remained there until she died in 1898. Never in good health, in January 1896, Foutz became dangerously ill with pneumonia and barely recovered. After he was released from the Bridegrooms in October 1896, Foutz was considered for a manager in the minor leagues or as a possible umpire, but by January 1897, he was too ill to work and was under a doctor's care. On March 5, 1897, Foutz died at his mother's home in Waverly, a suburb of Baltimore, Maryland, of an asthma attack. He was buried in the Loudon Park Cemetery, in Baltimore City, Maryland. Newspapers reported his funeral was a sad and somber affair, attended by many former teammates and baseball players. Also in attendance were executives from the National League as well as his old Brooklyn and St. Louis ball clubs.

== See also ==
- List of Major League Baseball player-managers
- List of Major League Baseball annual ERA leaders
- List of Major League Baseball annual saves leaders
- List of St. Louis Cardinals team records

Preceded by George Hemming	Brooklyn Grooms; Opening Day starting pitcher 1892	Succeeded by Ed Stein
