= Taylor Douthit =

American baseball player (1901–1986)

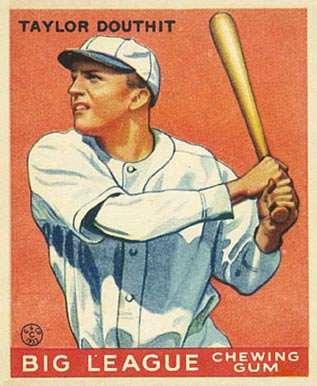
- Center fielder
- Born: April 22, 1901; Little Rock, Arkansas, U.S.
- Died: May 28, 1986 (aged 85); Fremont, California, U.S.
- Batted: Right Threw: Right

MLB debut
- September 14, 1923, for the St. Louis Cardinals

Last MLB appearance
- June 28, 1933, for the Chicago Cubs

MLB statistics
- Batting average: .291
- Home runs: 29
- Runs batted in: 396
- Stats at Baseball Reference

Teams
- St. Louis Cardinals (1923–1931); Cincinnati Reds (1931–1933); Chicago Cubs (1933)

Career highlights and awards
- World Series champion (1926)

Taylor Lee Douthit (/ˈdaʊθɪt/ DOW-thit; April 22, 1901 – May 28, 1986), nicknamed "the Ballhawk", was an American professional baseball player. He played in Major League Baseball (MLB) as an outfielder from 1923 to 1933, most notably as a member of the St. Louis Cardinals team with whom he won a World Series championship in 1926. Douthit set a record for single-season putouts by an outfielder (547) in 1928.

Late in his career, Douthit played for the Cincinnati Reds and the Chicago Cubs. He retired from baseball in 1933 rather than accepting a trade to the American Association, and he moved back to California to work in the family insurance business.

== Early life ==
Douthit was born in Little Rock, Arkansas, and he graduated from the University of California in 1923.

== Career ==
Douthit started out in the Cardinals organization and became a major league regular in 1926. The year before, he had hit .372 for Milwaukee of the American Association. As a rookie, he hit .308 and then .267 in the World Series to help St. Louis win the championship.

Before Douthit made his second appearance in a World Series in 1928, Cardinals manager Bill McKechnie compared him favorably to star outfielder Tris Speaker. "He has been compared to Speaker, but, in my opinion, it should be the other way," McKechnie said. "Speaker at his best should be compared with Douthit. [Douthit] covers an almost unbelievable amount of ground and is a sure catch. He leads off for us and has shown rare ability in 'getting on'."

In 1931, Douthit was traded to the Reds. He played in 95 and 96 games for the Reds in 1931 and 1932, respectively. The team waived him in late April 1933; he had made only one appearance (as a pinch runner) with the Reds that year. The Cubs claimed Douthit off waivers on April 29, but he did not stay in Chicago for long. The Cubs traded him to Kansas City of the American Association on June 29, 1933. Douthit thought that he should still be able to play in the major leagues, and he retired days later rather than reporting to Kansas City.

Douthit is the all-time record holder for range factor by a center fielder. His 547 outfield putouts in 1928 is the record for most outfield putouts in a season. His baseball glove was displayed at the Baseball Hall of Fame in an exhibit that discussed the putouts record. He is in the University of California Hall of Fame for his baseball and basketball play there.

In 1,074 games played, Douthit compiled a .291 batting average (1201–4127) with 665 runs, 29 home runs, 396 RBI, an on-base percentage of .364 and a slugging percentage of .384 in 11 seasons. In 13 World Series games, he batted .140 (7–40) with 5 runs and 4 RBI. He posted a .972 fielding percentage at all three outfield positions.

== Later life ==
After his baseball career ended, Douthit worked for his family's insurance business in California. He died in Fremont, California, on May 28, 1986.

== See also ==
- List of St. Louis Cardinals team records
