= Times on base =

Baseball statistic

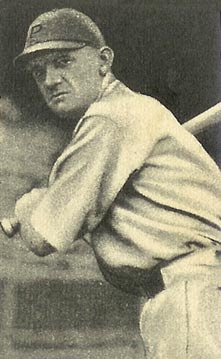
Max Carey was the first major-league player with nine times on base in a single game, in 1922.

In baseball statistics, the term times on base (TOB), is the cumulative total number of times a batter has reached base as a result of a hit, base on balls, or hit by pitch. This statistic does not include times reaching base by way of an error, uncaught third strike, fielder's obstruction or a fielder's choice, making the statistic somewhat of a misnomer.

== Times on base leaders in Major League Baseball ==
=== Career ===
As of the end of the 2025 season, the following are the top 10 players in career times on base.

1. Pete Rose – 5929
2. Barry Bonds – 5599
3. Ty Cobb – 5532
4. Rickey Henderson – 5343
5. Carl Yastrzemski – 5304
6. Stan Musial – 5282
7. Hank Aaron – 5205
8. Tris Speaker – 4998
9. Babe Ruth – 4978
10. Eddie Collins – 4891

=== Single-season ===
As of the end of the 2025 season, the following are the top 10 players in single-season times on base.

1. Babe Ruth, New York Yankees (1923) – 379
2. Barry Bonds, San Francisco Giants (2004) – 376
3. Billy Hamilton, Philadelphia Phillies (1894) – 362
4. Ted Williams, Boston Red Sox (1949) – 358
5. Barry Bonds, San Francisco Giants (2002) – 356
6. Babe Ruth, New York Yankees (1921) – 353
7. Babe Ruth, New York Yankees (1924) – 346
8. Ted Williams, Boston Red Sox (1947) – 345
9. Three players are tied for ninth:
  - Lou Gehrig, New York Yankees (1936) – 342
  - Wade Boggs, Boston Red Sox (1988) – 342
  - Barry Bonds, San Francisco Giants (2001) – 342

=== Single game ===
Four players have had 9 TOB in a single game:

- Max Carey, Pittsburgh Pirates, July 7, 1922 – six hits and three walks (18-inning game)
- Johnny Burnett, Cleveland Indians, July 10, 1932 – nine hits (18-inning game)
- Stan Hack, Chicago Cubs, August 9, 1942 – five hits and four walks (18-inning game)
- Shohei Ohtani, Los Angeles Dodgers, October 27, 2025 (2025 World Series game 3) – four hits and five walks, including four intentional walks (18-inning game)

Burnett's nine hits are the record for most hits in a single game in MLB history, albeit in extra innings. Ohtani's nine times on base is a postseason record.

== See also ==
- On-base percentage (OBP), which is the ratio of TOB to the sum of at bats, base on balls, hit by pitch, and sacrifice flies
