= Bill Gleason =

American baseball player (1858–1932)

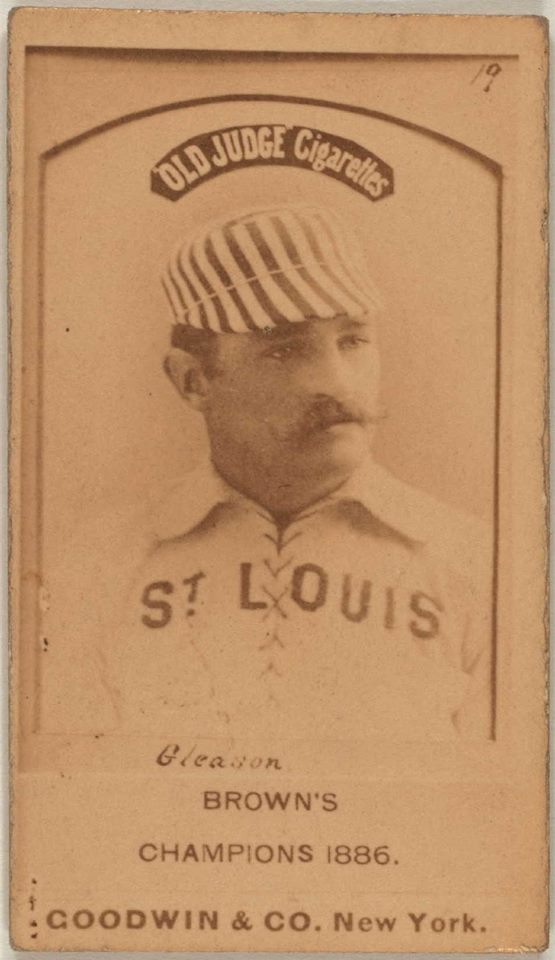
- Shortstop
- Born: November 12, 1858; St. Louis, Missouri, U.S.
- Died: July 21, 1932 (aged 73); St. Louis, Missouri, U.S.
- Batted: Right Threw: Right

MLB debut
- May 2, 1882, for the St. Louis Brown Stockings

Last MLB appearance
- June 18, 1889, for the Louisville Colonels

MLB statistics
- Batting average: .267
- Home runs: 7
- Runs batted in: 298
- Stats at Baseball Reference

Teams
- St. Louis Brown Stockings/Browns (1882–1887); Philadelphia Athletics (1888); Louisville Colonels (1889)

William G. Gleason (November 12, 1858 – July 21, 1932) was an American shortstop in Major League Baseball who played from 1882 through 1889 for three different teams of the American Association. Listed at 5 ft 8 in (1.73 m), 170 lb., Gleason batted and threw right-handed. His older brother, Jack Gleason, was also a ballplayer.

== Early life ==
A St. Louis native, Gleason played amateur baseball for the St. Louis Stocks as early as age 16. He earned the nickname "Brudder Bill" because he was teammates with his older sibling, Jack Gleason, on several amateur and professional baseball teams.

== Major league career ==
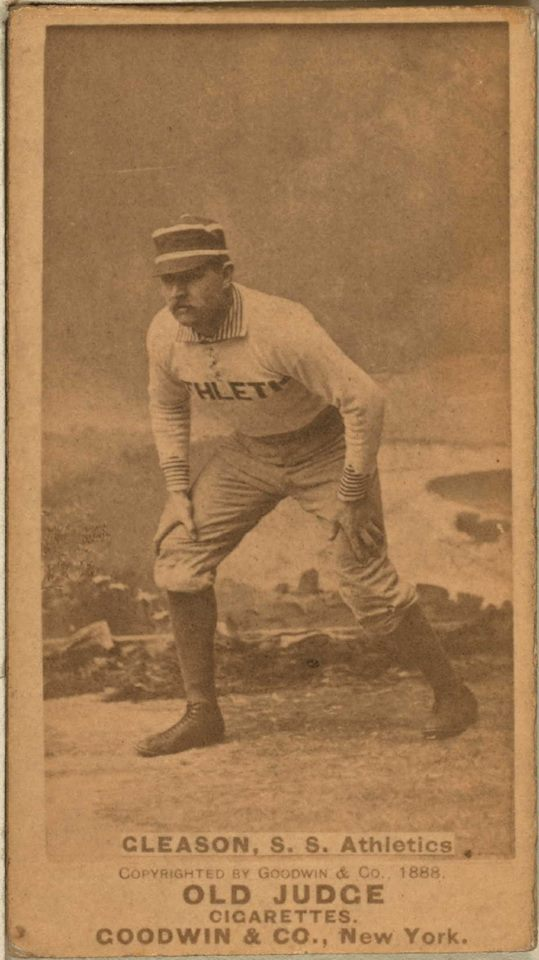

Gleason entered the majors in 1882 with the St. Louis Browns, where he and Jack Gleason were the first siblings to play in the same major league infield. His most productive season came in 1887, when he posted career numbers in batting average (.288), runs (135), hits (172), and on-base percentage (.342). A member of three St. Louis champion teams from 1885 to 1887, in 1883 and 1885 he led the league in games played.

During his time with the St. Louis Browns, Gleason was roommates with Charlie Comiskey. While Gleason was considered a gentleman off the field, he was loud and aggressive on the baseball diamond, often hurling continuous insults at opposing players or using his spikes on the basepaths to break up double plays. An 1885 Sporting Life article suggested that if Gleason broke a limb or his neck, "not a ball player in the American Association would feel the slightest regret."

After Gleason played for the Browns for six years, he joined the Philadelphia Athletics (1888) and Louisville Colonels (1889). In an eight-season career, Gleason was a .267 hitter (907-for-3395) with seven home runs and 298 RBI in 798 games, including 613 runs, 111 doubles, and 35 triples. Incomplete data shows him stealing 70 bases and getting hit by 52 pitches.

Gleason became an AA umpire in 1891, but his tenure lasted only one game. In Gleason's lone appearance, a game between the St. Louis Browns and Cincinnati Reds, King Kelly was the catcher and team captain of the Reds. With a tie game in the ninth inning, and with darkness setting in, Kelly told his Reds teammates to stall time. Gleason awarded a forfeit to St. Louis; the league fired him for the decision and the game was played again.

== Later life ==
Gleason was a member of the St. Louis Fire Department during and after his baseball career. Late in his life, he was a captain with Engine Co. No. 28. In the summer of 1932, Gleason stepped on a nail at a fire, resulting in a foot infection. While recovering from that infection, Gleason tried to walk to a local drug store. He collapsed from heat exhaustion and was confined to bed for a few days before he died in his St. Louis home on July 21, 1932.
