= Chicago Maroons (minor league) =

- 1888; Chicago, Illinois

Minor league affiliations
- Class: Class A (1888)
- League: Western Association (1888)

Major league affiliations
- Team: None

Minor league titles
- League titles: None

Team data
- Name: Chicago Maroons (1888)
- Ballpark: West Side Park (1888)

The Chicago Maroons were a minor league baseball team based in Chicago, Illinois in 1888. The Chicago Maroons played as members of the Class A level Western Association. Financial issues caused the team to fold after a sixth place season in 1888. The Maroons played minor league home games at West Side Park.

== History ==
In 1888, the Chicago Maroons began minor league play as members of the eight–team Class A level Western Association. In the era, Class A was the highest level of minor league baseball. The Maroons began 1888 play with the Des Moines Prohibitionists, Kansas City Blues, Milwaukee Brewers, Minneapolis Millers, Omaha Omahogs, St. Paul Apostles and St. Louis Whites teams joining Chicago in Western Association play.

The president of the Chicago Maroons was Sam Morton, who also was serving a dual role as president of the Western Association in 1888.

The Chicago Maroons began Western Association play on April 28, 1888. The Maroons finished the season in sixth place, playing under player/manager Moxie Hengel, who led the team with 5 home runs. With a record of 47–71, Chicago finished 32.0 games behind the first place Kansas City Blues in the final 1888 standings. The Maroons were led on the mound by Frank Dwyer, who won 19 games, pitching 322 innings with a 2.52 ERA and 35 complete games.

The Maroons were put up for sale after compiling a debt of $4,000, but the difficulty of having a minor league team playing in a major league city was not attractive to prospective buyers. In August 1888 the Chicago franchise was close to moving to Minneapolis, Minnesota for $5,000 after the Minneapolis Millers moved to become the Davenport Onion Weeders, but the deal fell through. The Chicago Maroons permanently folded after the 1888 season and did not return to play in the 1889 Western Association.

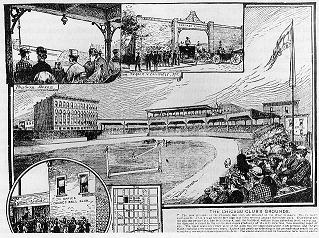
(1885) West Side Park. Chicago, Illinois

== The ballparks ==
The 1888 Chicago Maroons played many of their home games at West Side Park (I), sharing it with the National League's Chicago Cubs (then called the White Stockings). West Side Park had a capacity of 10,300, with field dimensions of (Left, Center, Right): 216–520–216. The site of the ballpark is now occupied by the Chicago World Language Academy. The location today is 1340 West Harrison in Chicago, Illinois.

The Maroons played some of their home schedule (typically Sunday games) at a new ballpark constructed by the Garden City Athletic Club, which was typically described as "the corner of Lincoln and Polk." It was also described as "back of the County Hospital." It only sat a few thousand, but would eventually become West Side Park (II), the home of the Cubs from mid-1893 through 1915. That property is now occupied by the UIC Medical Center.

== Year–by–year record ==
Year	Record	Finish	Manager	Playoffs/Notes
1888	47–71	6th	Moxie Hengel	No playoffs held

== Notable alumni ==
- Charlie Cady (1888)
- Dad Clarkson (1888)
- Roscoe Coughlin (1888)
- Dan Dugdale (1888)
- Frank Dwyer (1888)
- Pete Galligan (1888)
- Moxie Hengel (1888, MGR)
- Charlie Hoover (1888)
- Charlie Ingraham (1888)
- Herman Long (1888)
- Jim McCauley (1888)
- Gene Moriarty (1888)
- Chick Pedroes (1888)
- George Rooks (1888)
- Jumbo Schoeneck (1888)
- Milt Scott (1888)
- Charlie Sprague (1888)
- Chicago Maroons players

== Gallery ==
First at West Side Park II

First at West Side Park I
