= Cardinals–Cubs rivalry =

Major League Baseball rivalry

- St. Louis Cardinals Chicago Cubs
- Location: Midwestern United States
- First meeting: October 14, 1885; Congress Street Grounds, Chicago, Illinois; Browns 5, White Stockings 5
- Latest meeting: August 16, 2026; Wrigley Field, Chicago, Illinois; Cardinals 11, Cubs 4
- Next meeting: March 29, 2027; Wrigley Field, Chicago, Illinois
- Stadiums: Cardinals: Busch Stadium; Cubs: Wrigley Field

Statistics
- Total meetings: 2,556
- All-time series: Cubs, 1,295–1,241–20 (.511)
- Regular season series: Cubs, 1,287–1,233–19 (.511)
- Postseason results: Tie, 8–8–1 (.500)
- Largest victory: Cardinals, 21–3 (April 27, 1977); Colts, 26–8 (August 1, 1894)
- Longest win streak: Cardinals, 14 (April 21–September 7, 1944); Cubs, 13 (April 18–July 2, 1918)
- Current win streak: Cardinals, 2

Post-season history
- 1885 World Series: Tie, 3–3–1; 1886 World Series: Browns won, 4–2; 2015 NL Division Series: Cubs won, 3–1

Locations of the St. Louis Cardinals and Chicago Cubs

The Cardinals–Cubs rivalry, also called the Route 66 rivalry and The I-55 rivalry, refers to the rivalry between the St. Louis Cardinals and Chicago Cubs of the National League (NL), one of the most bitter rivalries in Major League Baseball and in all of North American professional sports. The Cardinals have won 19 NL pennants, while the Cubs have won 17. However, the Cardinals have a clear edge when it comes to World Series success, having won 11 championships to the Cubs' three. Games between the two clubs see numerous visiting fans in either St. Louis's Busch Stadium or Chicago's Wrigley Field. When the NL split into two divisions in 1969, and later three divisions in 1994, the Cardinals and Cubs remained together.

The Cubs lead the regular season series 1,287–1,233–19. The teams' lone MLB playoff meeting occurred in the 2015 National League Division Series, which the Cubs won, 3–1. The two teams previously met in the pre-modern 1885 and 1886 World Series, which ended in a tie and Browns (Cardinals) victory, respectively, when the then Chicago White Stockings of the NL played against the then St. Louis Browns of the American Association (AA).

== First meetings in 19th century World Series ==
In his book, Before They Were Cardinals, Jon David Cash speculates that the economic trade rivalry between the cities of Chicago and St. Louis led to the formation of the St. Louis Brown Stockings in 1875 to compete with the Chicago White Stockings. The Brown Stockings would later fold and reemerge in 1882 when the Cardinals (as the Browns), met the Cubs (as the White Stockings), in a pair of pre-World Series matchups between AA champion St. Louis and NL champion Chicago.

=== First meeting ===
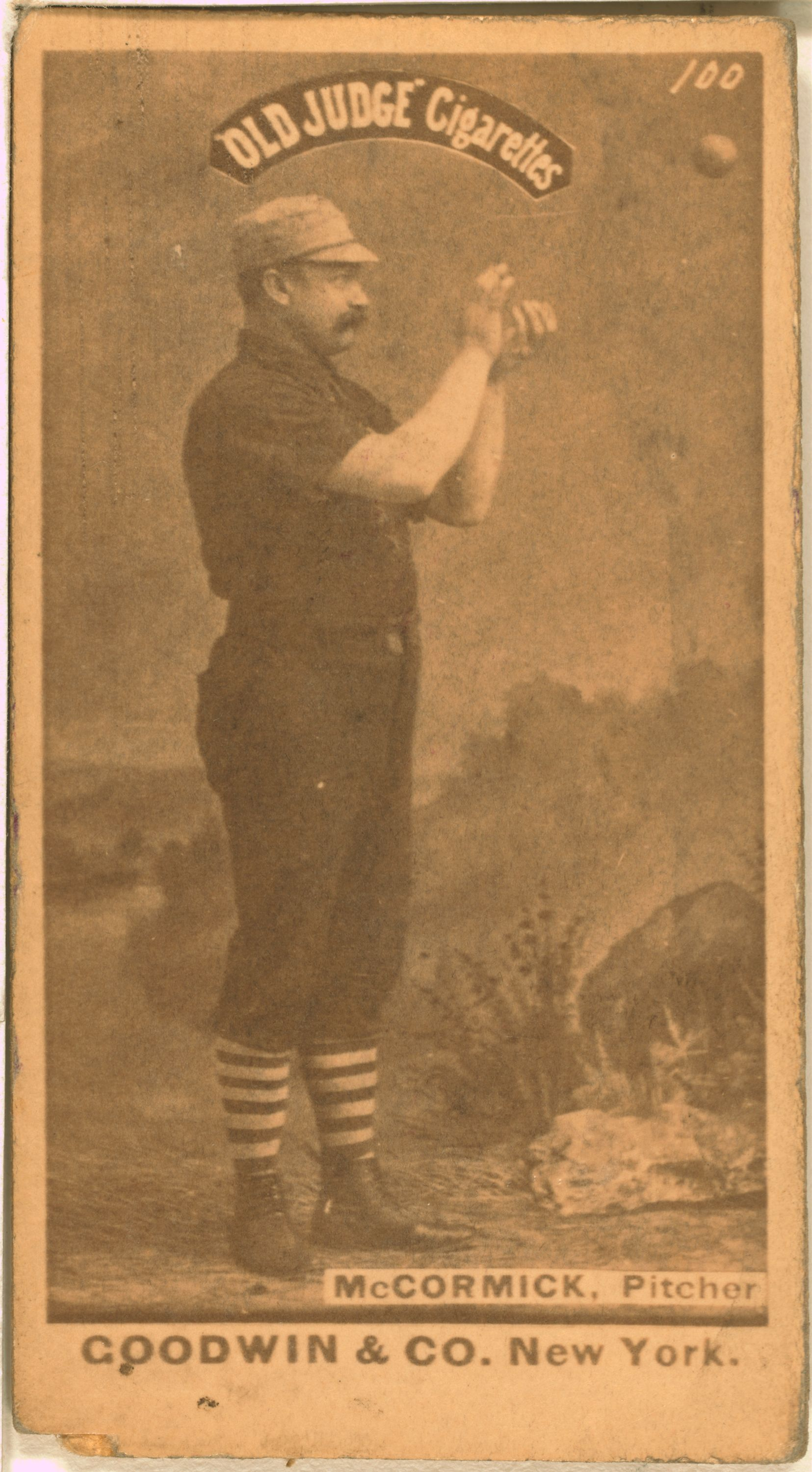
Pitcher Jim McCormick started five of the seven games for Chicago in the 1885 World Series between the two teams, going 3–2.

The first series meeting between the two teams was actually played in four cities — not only St. Louis and Chicago, but also Pittsburgh and Cincinnati. On October 15, Browns manager Charles Comiskey pulled his team off the field in the 6th inning in protest of umpire Dave Sullivan's call. The White Stockings were in the lead at the time 5–4 and were declared a winner on forfeit. Behind pitcher Dave Foutz, St. Louis defeated Chicago 13–4 in Game 7. The Browns claimed the Game 2 forfeit didn't count and therefore claimed the championship. The two clubs split the $1000 prize.

=== The $15,000 slide ===
The first series played in 1885 ended in dispute with no winner making the rematch a year later more heated. Game 2 saw the Browns win in a 12–0 romp. Bob Caruthers pitched a one-hitter, and left fielder Tip O'Neill smacked two inside-the-park home runs. It was the first two-home-run game by a player in a World Championship game. Despite the win, the White Stockings had won Games 1 and 3 and took the series lead into St. Louis. Oddities happened in Game 5. With Jim McCormick and Jocko Flynn lame and John Clarkson tired‚ Chicago tried to use a minor league recruit in the pitcher's box‚ only to be refused by the Browns. Shortstop Ned Williamson and right fielder Jimmy Ryan ended up having to pitch. The Browns won easily 10–3. The sixth and final game began at an earlier time of 2:18 PM, so the full nine innings could be played. Pitching his fourth game in six days‚ Clarkson held St. Louis hitless for six innings as Chicago built a 3–0 lead. However, in the 8th, the Browns finally got to Clarkson to tie the game at 3, with Arlie Latham hitting a 2-run triple. In the 10th, Curt Welch scored on the "$15‚000 slide" after a wild pitch to win it in front of a fired-up St. Louis home crowd.

== Cardinals join the National League ==
=== Early Cubs dominance ===
After the dissolution of the American Association, the Browns franchise moved to the National League in 1892 and become known as the Cardinals in 1900. (The Browns name was later used by an AL team that had previously been known as the Milwaukee Brewers, and is now the Baltimore Orioles.) St. Louis would not achieve much success in its early years in the NL. On the other hand, the Cubs won three straight pennants from 1906 to 1908 and two World Series during that time. The Cubs would also go on to win seven more pennants from then until 1945.

=== The tide turns ===
The Cardinals would eventually put together a team to win the pennant and World Series in 1926. It would be their first National League pennant and first championship since defeating the White Stockings. Although the Cubs would also win a few pennants, their championship run stopped in 1908. Eventually, the Cubs' pennant wins would also stop in 1945, and they did not win another until 2016, when they also won the World Series. The Cardinals have won the World Series 11 times, the most of any National League team and second New York Yankees (27) in all of MLB.

=== Hack Wilson's riot ===
Cubs' slugger Hack Wilson had a combative streak and frequently initiated fights with opposing players and fans. On June 22, 1928, a riot broke out in the ninth inning at Wrigley Field when Wilson jumped into the box seats to attack a heckling fan. An estimated 5,000 spectators swarmed the field before police could separate the combatants and restore order. The fan sued Wilson for $20,000, but a jury ruled in Wilson's favor.

== Modern period ==
=== The Sandberg Game ===
One game in particular was cited for putting Cubs second baseman Ryne Sandberg, as well as the 1984 Cubs in general, "on the map", an NBC national telecast of a Cardinals–Cubs game on June 23, 1984. The Cubs had been playing well throughout the season's first few months, but as a team unaccustomed to winning, they had not yet become a serious contender in the eyes of most baseball fans.

Sandberg had played two full seasons in the major leagues, and while he had proven himself to be a top-fielding second baseman and fast on the basepaths (over 30 stolen bases both seasons), his .260-ish batting average and single-digit home run production were respectable for his position but not especially noteworthy, and Sandberg was not talked about outside Chicago. The Game of the Week, however, put the sleeper Cubs on the national stage against their regional rival, the St. Louis Cardinals. Both teams were well-established franchises with a strong fan base outside the Chicago and St. Louis area.

In the ninth inning, the Cubs trailed 9–8, and faced the premier relief pitcher of the time, Bruce Sutter. Sutter was at the forefront of the emergence of the closer in the late 1970s and early 1980s: a hard-throwing pitcher who typically came in just for the ninth inning and saved around 30 games a season. (Sutter was especially dominant in 1984, saving 45 games.) However, in the ninth inning, Sandberg, not yet known for his power, slugged a home run to left field against the Cardinals' ace closer. Despite this dramatic act, the Cardinals scored two runs in the top of the tenth. Sandberg came up again in the tenth inning, facing a determined Sutter with one man on base. As Cubs' radio announcer Harry Caray described it:

There's a drive, way back! Might be outta here! It is! It is! He did it again! He did it again! The game is tied! The game is tied! Holy Cow! Listen to this crowd, everybody's gone bananas!

The Cubs went on to win in the 11th inning. The Cardinals' Willie McGee (who had hit for the cycle that day) had already been named NBC's player of the game before Sandberg's first home run. As NBC play-by-play man Bob Costas (who called the game with Tony Kubek) said when Sandberg hit that second home run, "Do you believe it?!" The game is sometimes called "The Sandberg Game". The winning run for the Cubs was driven in by a single off the bat of Dave Owen.

=== McGwire/Sosa home run chase ===
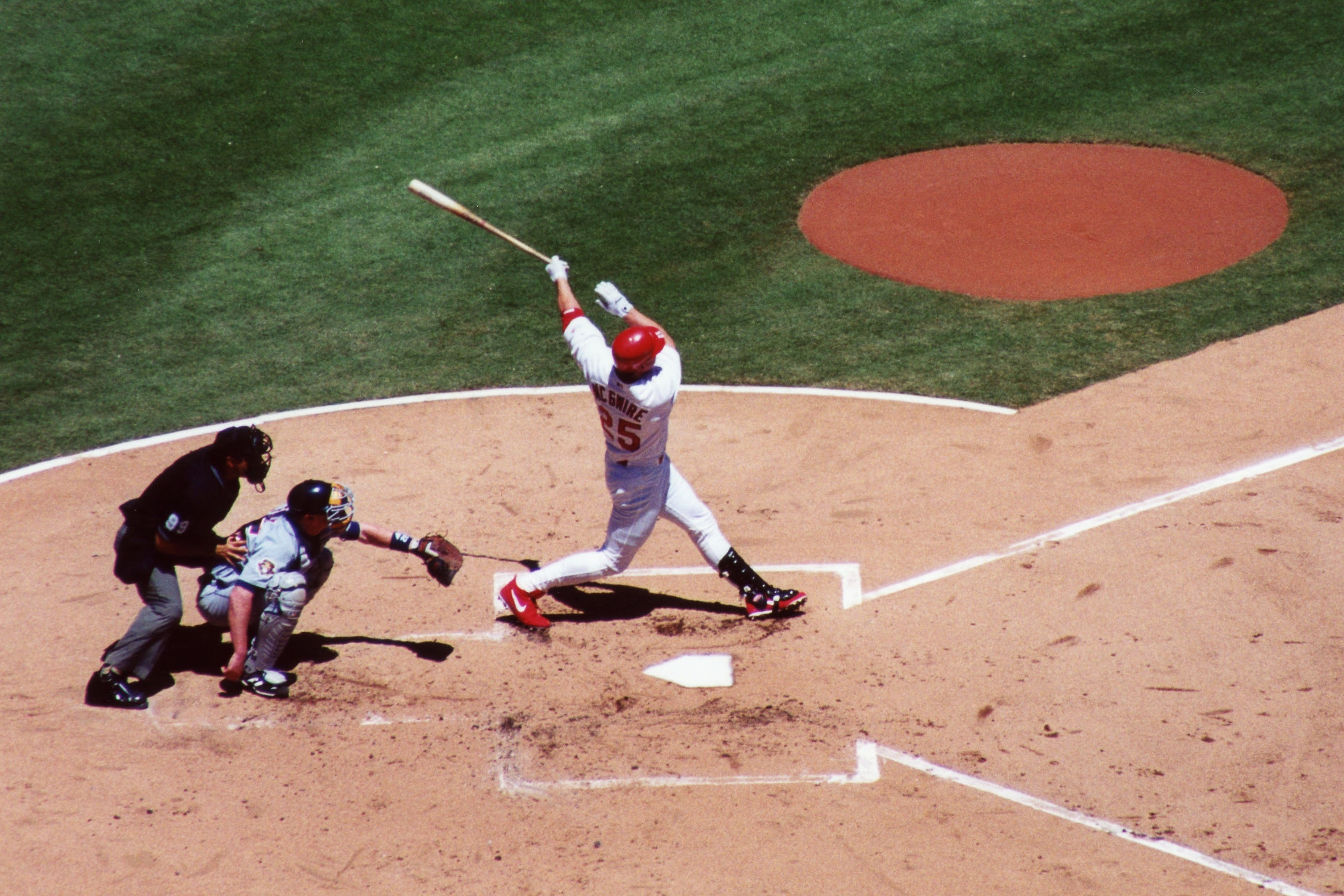
Mark McGwire hitting a home run at Busch Stadium.

In 1998, the teams were connected by the Mark McGwire-Sammy Sosa home run race, credited by many with revitalizing the sport following the players' strike which cancelled the 1994 World Series and the first part of the 1995 season.

In early September the teams met for a two-game series in St. Louis. In the first game, McGwire hit his record-tying 61st home run off pitcher Mike Morgan in the first inning as part of a 3–2 Cardinals victory. The following day, McGwire broke the record with #62 off Steve Trachsel in the fourth inning as part of a 6–3 victory. In a show of sportsmanship, Sammy Sosa embraced and congratulated his rival and on-field opponent after McGwire rounded the bases. McGwire would finish the year with 70 home runs and Sosa with 66. However, the Cubs won the National League wild card, making the playoffs for the first time in nine years, while the Cardinals missed the playoffs. Sosa eventually became the NL MVP that season.

Sosa dedicated each of his 66 home runs that season to the memory of Cubs (and former Cardinals) broadcaster Harry Caray, who died in February that year.

=== After the chase ===
A somber showing of acknowledgment between the two teams happened in 2002 when Cubs catcher Joe Girardi addressed the fans at Wrigley Field in a choked up way that the game between the two teams had been cancelled and that the fans should pray for the St. Louis Cardinals family. However, there were fans who booed. Later, a press conference was held where an emotional Girardi addressed the death of Cardinals pitcher Darryl Kile. Girardi, who played for both the Cubs and the Cardinals, addressed the fans in a regional broadcast on Fox.

In 2005, Cubs first baseman Derrek Lee and Cardinals first baseman Albert Pujols were locked in an MVP race. Lee led the NL in hits and batting average and bested Pujols in home runs. For his part, Pujols led the league in runs scored and had the edge on Lee in RBIs. Lee was awarded both the Gold Glove and Silver Slugger as the best NL first baseman on both defense and offense, respectively. However, with the Cardinals winning 100 games and the division and the Cubs finishing 21 games back in fourth place, Pujols won the MVP honors.

On June 4 and 5, 2011 Pujols won back-to-back games against the Cubs with walk-off home runs.

In recent years, tragedies in the Cardinals organization have caused two games between these teams to be postponed. In 2002, after Cardinals pitcher Darryl Kile was found dead in a Chicago hotel room, a game between the teams in Wrigley Field was postponed. Then in 2007, another Cardinals pitcher, Josh Hancock, was killed in a car crash while driving intoxicated, causing a game in St. Louis to be postponed.

Former Cubs shortstop Ryan Theriot, who was acquired by the Cardinals on November 30, 2010, told a St. Louis radio station that he was "finally on the right side of the Cardinals–Cubs rivalry" and that he was happy to be with an organization that emphasized winning World Series championships instead of being "an afterthought". Cubs pitcher Carlos Zambrano called him "the enemy now". The Cardinals won the World Series that season.

The two clubs played each other in the postseason for the first time in the 2015 National League Division Series, as a result of the Cubs' 4–0 victory over the Pittsburgh Pirates in the NL Wild Card Game. The Cubs defeated the Cardinals 3–1 to advance to the National League Championship Series, where they lost to the New York Mets.

The rivalry was further heated after John Lackey and Jason Heyward signed with the Cubs after the 2015 season and Dexter Fowler signed with the Cardinals after the Cubs' 2016 championship season.

=== Wrigley Field Sweep ===
In a pivotal series that determined each team's chance for the playoffs, the Cardinals played the Cubs at Wrigley Field in a four-game series from September 19–22, 2019. The Cardinals went into the series three games ahead of the Cubs with the opportunity to clinch the division title, while the Cubs had the opportunity to overtake the Cardinals for the division lead. After the Cardinals won the first two games, the September 21 game was ranked the 5th most exciting game in top 10 MLB games of 2019. In the bottom of the 7th with the Cardinals leading 7–6, Cardinals reliever Giovanny Gallegos committed a no-stop balk while striking out Tony Kemp. The call was seen as controversial to some. Announcer Tim McCarver noted that Gallegos had done that the whole game and that the umpire who called it was the furthest away from the pitcher. Given a second chance, Kemp hit a two-run home run giving the Cubs an 8–7 lead. Cubs closer Craig Kimbrel was called in to close the game for a Cubs win. However, Kimbrel gave up home runs to Yadier Molina and Paul DeJong to give the Cardinals a 9–8 lead. The Cardinals would win by that score.

The Cardinals completed the sweep the next day — their first four-game sweep of the Cubs at Wrigley Field since 1921 — to clinch a playoff spot.

== Season-by-season results ==
Cardinals vs. Cubs Season-by-Season Results
1880s (Browns, 7–5–1)

Season	Season series		at St. Louis Browns	at Chicago White Stockings	at other	Overall series	Notes
1885 World Series	Tie	3‍–‍3‍–‍1	Tie, 0‍–‍0‍–‍1	Browns, 2‍–‍1	White Stockings, 2‍–‍1	Tie; 3‍–‍3‍–‍1	Pre-modern championship. Browns claim game 2 forfeit didn't count and therefore claim the championship, though $1000 price is split. Games 5 through 7 of the 1885 World Series were played in Pittsburgh or Cincinnati, away for both teams.
1886 World Series	Browns	4‍–‍2	Browns, 3‍–‍0	White Stockings, 2‍–‍1	no games	Browns; 7‍–‍5‍–‍1	Pre-modern championship

1890s (Colts/Orphans, 61–39)

Season	Season series		at St. Louis Browns/Perfectos	at Chicago Colts/Orphans	Overall series	Notes
1892	Colts	7‍–‍5	Colts, 3‍–‍2	Colts, 4‍–‍3	Tie; 12‍–‍12‍–‍1	St. Louis Browns join the National League; In the time since the pre-modern 1886 World Series, the White Stockings changed their name to the Colts.
1893	Browns	9‍–‍3	Browns, 6‍–‍0	Tie, 3‍–‍3	Browns; 21‍–‍15‍–‍1	
1894	Tie	6‍–‍6	Browns, 4‍–‍2	Colts, 4‍–‍2	Browns; 27‍–‍21‍–‍1	
1895	Colts	10‍–‍2	Colts, 5‍–‍1	Colts, 5‍–‍1	Colts; 31‍–‍29‍–‍1	
1896	Colts	9‍–‍3	Tie, 3‍–‍3	Colts, 6‍–‍0	Colts; 40‍–‍32‍–‍1	Colts take a 32‍–‍31‍–‍1 lead on April 22 in the series, a lead they would never relinquish.
1897	Colts	8‍–‍4	Colts, 4‍–‍2	Colts, 4‍–‍2	Colts; 48‍–‍36‍–‍1	
1898	Orphans	10‍–‍4	Orphans, 2‍–‍0	Orphans, 8‍–‍4	Orphans; 58‍–‍40‍–‍1	Colts change their name to "Orphans."
1899	Orphans	8‍–‍6	Perfectos, 5‍–‍2	Orphans, 6‍–‍1	Orphans; 66‍–‍46‍–‍1	Browns change their name to "Perfectos."

1900s (Orphans/Cubs, 144–64–6)

Season	Season series		at St. Louis Cardinals	at Chicago Orphans/Cubs	Overall series	Notes
1900	Cardinals	11‍–‍9‍–‍2	Cardinals, 6‍–‍1‍–‍1	Orphans, 8‍–‍5‍–‍1	Orphans; 75‍–‍57‍–‍3	Perfectos change their name to "Cardinals."
1901	Tie	10‍–‍10	Cardinals, 6‍–‍4	Orphans, 6‍–‍4	Orphans; 85‍–‍67‍–‍3	
1902	Orphans	12‍–‍5‍–‍1	Orphans, 7‍–‍1‍–‍1	Orphans, 5‍–‍4	Orphans; 97‍–‍72‍–‍4	
1903	Cubs	16‍–‍4	Cubs, 7‍–‍2	Cubs, 9‍–‍2	Cubs; 113‍–‍76‍–‍4	Orphans change their name to "Cubs."; First year of organized Major League Baseball
1904	Cubs	15‍–‍7	Cubs, 7‍–‍4	Cubs, 8‍–‍3	Cubs; 128‍–‍83‍–‍4	
1905	Cubs	17‍–‍5	Cubs, 6‍–‍3	Cubs, 11‍–‍2	Cubs; 145‍–‍88‍–‍4	
1906	Cubs	15‍–‍6‍–‍1	Cubs, 9‍–‍1‍–‍1	Cubs, 6‍–‍5	Cubs; 160‍–‍94‍–‍5	Cubs lose 1906 World Series.
1907	Cubs	16‍–‍6‍–‍1	Cubs, 8‍–‍5	Cubs, 8‍–‍1‍–‍1	Cubs; 176‍–‍100‍–‍6	Cubs win ten straight meetings to start the season, Cubs win 1907 World Series.
1908	Cubs	19‍–‍3	Cubs, 9‍–‍2	Cubs, 10‍–‍1	Cubs; 195‍–‍103‍–‍6	Cubs win 1908 World Series, their last title until 2016.
1909	Cubs	15‍–‍7‍–‍1	Cubs, 8‍–‍3‍–‍1	Cubs, 7‍–‍4	Cubs; 210‍–‍110‍–‍7	

1910s (Cubs, 136–78–5)

Season	Season series		at St. Louis Cardinals	at Chicago Cubs	Overall series	Notes
1910	Cubs	15‍–‍7	Cubs, 8‍–‍3	Cubs, 7‍–‍4	Cubs; 225‍–‍117‍–‍7	Cubs lose 1910 World Series
1911	Cubs	16‍–‍6‍–‍2	Cubs, 9‍–‍2	Cubs, 7‍–‍4‍–‍2	Cubs; 241‍–‍123‍–‍9	
1912	Cubs	15‍–‍7	Cubs, 7‍–‍4	Cubs, 8‍–‍3	Cubs; 256‍–‍130‍–‍9	
1913	Cubs	16‍–‍6‍–‍1	Cubs, 8‍–‍3‍–‍1	Cubs, 8‍–‍3	Cubs; 272‍–‍136‍–‍10	
1914	Cardinals	12‍–‍10‍–‍2	Cardinals, 6‍–‍5‍–‍2	Cardinals, 6‍–‍5	Cubs; 282‍–‍148‍–‍12	Cubs open Wrigley Field
1915	Cubs	12‍–‍10	Cardinals, 7‍–‍4	Cubs, 8‍–‍3	Cubs; 294‍–‍158‍–‍12	
1916	Cubs	14‍–‍8	Cubs, 6‍–‍4	Cubs, 8‍–‍4	Cubs; 308‍–‍166‍–‍12	
1917	Cardinals	12‍–‍10	Cubs, 6‍–‍5	Cardinals, 7‍–‍4	Cubs; 318‍–‍178‍–‍12	
1918	Cubs	15‍–‍3	Cubs, 6‍–‍3	Cubs, 9‍–‍0	Cubs; 333‍–‍181‍–‍12	Cubs lose 1918 World Series
1919	Cubs	13‍–‍7	Tie, 5‍–‍5	Cubs, 8‍–‍2	Cubs; 346‍–‍188‍–‍12	

1920s (Cubs, 112–105–1)

Season	Season series		at St. Louis Cardinals	at Chicago Cubs	Overall series	Notes
1920	Cardinals	12‍–‍10	Cardinals, 8‍–‍3	Cubs, 7‍–‍4	Cubs; 356‍–‍200‍–‍12	Cardinals move to Sportsman's Park
1921	Cardinals	14‍–‍8	Cardinals, 6‍–‍5	Cardinals, 8‍–‍3	Cubs; 364‍–‍214‍–‍12	Cardinals win consecutive season series for the first time in the history of the rivalry.
1922	Cubs	13‍–‍9	Cubs, 8‍–‍3	Cardinals, 6‍–‍5	Cubs; 377‍–‍223‍–‍12	Cardinals' 2B Rogers Hornsby wins NL triple crown
1923	Cubs	12‍–‍10	Cardinals, 7‍–‍4	Cubs, 8‍–‍3	Cubs; 389‍–‍233‍–‍12	
1924	Cubs	15‍–‍7	Cubs, 6‍–‍5	Cubs, 9‍–‍2	Cubs; 404‍–‍240‍–‍12	
1925	Cardinals	14‍–‍8	Cardinals, 7‍–‍4	Cardinals, 7‍–‍4	Cubs; 412‍–‍254‍–‍12	Hornsby wins second NL triple crown
1926	Tie	11‍–‍11	Cardinals, 6‍–‍5	Cubs, 6‍–‍5	Cubs; 423‍–‍265‍–‍12	Cardinals win 1926 World Series
1927	Cardinals	12‍–‍9	Cardinals, 8‍–‍2	Cubs, 7‍–‍4	Cubs; 432‍–‍277‍–‍12	
1928	Tie	11‍–‍11	Cubs, 7‍–‍4	Cardinals, 7‍–‍4	Cubs; 443‍–‍228‍–‍112	Hack Wilson's riot, Cardinals lose 1928 World Series
1929	Cubs	15‍–‍5‍–‍1	Cubs, 6‍–‍3‍–‍1	Cubs, 9‍–‍2	Cubs; 458‍–‍293‍–‍13	Cubs lose 1929 World Series

1930s (Cubs, 111–109–1)

Season	Season series		at St. Louis Cardinals	at Chicago Cubs	Overall series	Notes
1930	Tie	11‍–‍11	Cardinals, 6‍–‍5	Cubs, 6‍–‍5	Cubs; 469‍–‍304‍–‍13	Teams play a 20-inning game on August 28, the longest game in the history of the rivalry. Cardinals lose 1930 World Series
1931	Cardinals	14‍–‍8	Cardinals, 8‍–‍3	Cardinals, 6‍–‍5	Cubs; 477‍–‍318‍–‍13	Cardinals win 1931 World Series
1932	Cubs	12‍–‍10	Cardinals, 6‍–‍5	Cubs, 7‍–‍4	Cubs; 489‍–‍328‍–‍13	Cubs lose 1932 World Series
1933	Tie	11‍–‍11	Cardinals, 7‍–‍4	Cubs, 7‍–‍4	Cubs; 500‍–‍339‍–‍13	
1934	Cubs	12‍–‍10	Cubs, 7‍–‍4	Cardinals, 6‍–‍5	Cubs; 512‍–‍349‍–‍13	Cardinals win 1934 World Series
1935	Cardinals	14‍–‍8	Cardinals, 6‍–‍5	Cardinals, 8‍–‍3	Cubs; 520‍–‍363‍–‍13	Cubs lose 1935 World Series
1936	Cardinals	13‍–‍9	Cubs, 6‍–‍5	Cardinals, 8‍–‍3	Cubs; 529‍–‍376‍–‍13	
1937	Cubs	17‍–‍5	Cubs, 8‍–‍3	Cubs, 9‍–‍2	Cubs; 546‍–‍381‍–‍13	
1938	Cubs	13‍–‍9‍–‍1	Cubs, 7‍–‍4‍–‍1	Cubs, 6‍–‍5	Cubs; 559‍–‍390‍–‍14	Cubs lose 1938 World Series
1939	Cardinals	12‍–‍10	Cardinals, 6‍–‍5	Cardinals, 6‍–‍5	Cubs; 569‍–‍402‍–‍14	

1940s (Cardinals, 138–82)

Season	Season series		at St. Louis Cardinals	at Chicago Cubs	Overall series	Notes
1940	Cardinals	14‍–‍8	Cardinals, 8‍–‍3	Cardinals, 6‍–‍5	Cubs; 577‍–‍416‍–‍14	
1941	Cardinals	12‍–‍10	Cardinals, 8‍–‍3	Cubs, 7‍–‍4	Cubs; 587‍–‍428‍–‍14	
1942	Cardinals	16‍–‍6	Cardinals, 9‍–‍2	Cardinals, 7‍–‍4	Cubs; 593‍–‍444‍–‍14	Cardinals win 1942 World Series
1943	Cardinals	13‍–‍9	Cardinals, 8‍–‍5	Cardinals, 5‍–‍4	Cubs; 602‍–‍457‍–‍14	Cardinals lose 1943 World Series
1944	Cardinals	16‍–‍6	Cardinals, 9‍–‍2	Cardinals, 7‍–‍4	Cubs; 608‍–‍473‍–‍14	Cardinals win 14 straight meetings to start the season, Cardinals win 1944 World Series
1945	Cardinals	16‍–‍6	Cardinals, 8‍–‍3	Cardinals, 8‍–‍3	Cubs; 614‍–‍489‍–‍14	Cubs lose 1945 World Series
1946	Cardinals	14‍–‍8	Cardinals, 6‍–‍5	Cardinals, 8‍–‍3	Cubs; 622‍–‍503‍–‍14	Cardinals win 1946 World Series
1947	Cardinals	12‍–‍10	Cardinals, 6‍–‍5	Cardinals, 6‍–‍5	Cubs; 632‍–‍515‍–‍14	
1948	Tie	11‍–‍11	Cardinals, 7‍–‍4	Cubs, 7‍–‍4	Cubs; 643‍–‍526‍–‍14	
1949	Cardinals	14‍–‍8	Cardinals, 8‍–‍3	Cardinals, 6‍–‍5	Cubs; 651‍–‍540‍–‍14	

1950s (Cardinals, 113–107–2)

Season	Season series		at St. Louis Cardinals	at Chicago Cubs	Overall series	Notes
1950	Cardinals	12‍–‍10	Cardinals, 9‍–‍2	Cubs, 8‍–‍3	Cubs; 661‍–‍552‍–‍14	
1951	Cardinals	13‍–‍9‍–‍1	Cubs, 6‍–‍5‍–‍1	Cardinals, 8‍–‍3	Cubs; 670‍–‍565‍–‍15	
1952	Tie	11‍–‍11	Cardinals, 7‍–‍4	Cubs, 7‍–‍4	Cubs; 681‍–‍576‍–‍15	
1953	Tie	11‍–‍11	Cardinals, 7‍–‍4	Cubs, 7‍–‍4	Cubs; 692‍–‍587‍–‍15	
1954	Cubs	14‍–‍8	Cubs, 7‍–‍4	Cubs, 7‍–‍4	Cubs; 706‍–‍595‍–‍15	Cubs win season series for first time since 1938
1955	Cubs	14‍–‍8	Cardinals, 6‍–‍5	Cubs, 9‍–‍2	Cubs; 720‍–‍603‍–‍15	
1956	Cardinals	13‍–‍9‍–‍1	Cardinals, 8‍–‍3	Cubs, 6‍–‍5‍–‍1	Cubs; 729‍–‍616‍–‍16	
1957	Cubs	12‍–‍10	Cubs, 8‍–‍3	Cardinals, 7‍–‍4	Cubs; 741‍–‍626‍–‍16	Both teams post 6-game winning streaks over their opponents during this season
1958	Cardinals	15‍–‍7	Cardinals, 7‍–‍4	Cardinals, 8‍–‍3	Cubs; 748‍–‍641‍–‍16	
1959	Cardinals	12‍–‍10	Cardinals, 6‍–‍5	Cardinals, 6‍–‍5	Cubs; 758‍–‍653‍–‍16	

1960s (Cardinals, 114–73–3)

Season	Season series		at St. Louis Cardinals	at Chicago Cubs	Overall series	Notes
1960	Cardinals	14‍–‍8‍–‍1	Cardinals, 9‍–‍2	Cubs, 6‍–‍5‍–‍1	Cubs; 766‍–‍667‍–‍17	
1961	Cardinals	15‍–‍7‍–‍1	Cardinals, 11‍–‍0‍–‍1	Cubs, 7‍–‍4	Cubs; 773‍–‍682‍–‍18	
1962	Cardinals	11‍–‍7	Cardinals, 5‍–‍4	Cardinals, 6‍–‍3	Cubs; 780‍–‍693‍–‍18	Cardinals win 17 straight home games from July 1960 to April 1962 (excluding ties). MLB expansion reduces schedule to 18 meetings per year
1963	Cardinals	11‍–‍7	Cardinals, 6‍–‍3	Cardinals, 5‍–‍4	Cubs; 787‍–‍704‍–‍18	
1964	Cardinals	12‍–‍6	Cardinals, 6‍–‍3	Cardinals, 6‍–‍3	Cubs; 793‍–‍716‍–‍18	Cardinals win 1964 World Series
1965	Cubs	10‍–‍8‍–‍1	Cardinals, 5‍–‍4	Cubs, 6‍–‍3‍–‍1	Cubs; 803‍–‍724‍–‍19	
1966	Cardinals	14‍–‍4	Cardinals, 7‍–‍2	Cardinals, 7‍–‍2	Cubs; 807‍–‍738‍–‍19	Cardinals open Busch Memorial Stadium
1967	Cardinals	11‍–‍6	Cardinals, 7‍–‍2	Tie, 4‍–‍4	Cubs; 813‍–‍749‍–‍19	Cardinals win 1967 World Series
1968	Tie	9‍–‍9	Cardinals, 5‍–‍4	Cubs, 5‍–‍4	Cubs; 822‍–‍758‍–‍19	Cardinals lose 1968 World Series
1969	Tie	9‍–‍9	Cardinals, 5‍–‍4	Cubs, 5‍–‍4	Cubs; 831‍–‍767‍–‍19	

1970s (Cubs, 93–87)

Season	Season series		at St. Louis Cardinals	at Chicago Cubs	Overall series	Notes
1970	Cardinals	11‍–‍7	Cardinals, 6‍–‍3	Cardinals, 5‍–‍4	Cubs; 838‍–‍778‍–‍19	
1971	Tie	9‍–‍9	Cardinals, 5‍–‍4	Cubs, 5‍–‍4	Cubs; 847‍–‍787‍–‍19	
1972	Cubs	10‍–‍8	Cardinals, 5‍–‍4	Cubs, 6‍–‍3	Cubs; 857‍–‍795‍–‍19	
1973	Tie	9‍–‍9	Cardinals, 5‍–‍4	Cubs, 5‍–‍4	Cubs; 866‍–‍804‍–‍19	
1974	Cardinals	13‍–‍5	Cardinals, 6‍–‍3	Cardinals, 7‍–‍2	Cubs; 871‍–‍817‍–‍19	
1975	Cubs	11‍–‍7	Cubs, 5‍–‍4	Cubs, 6‍–‍3	Cubs; 882‍–‍824‍–‍19	
1976	Cubs	12‍–‍6	Cubs, 5‍–‍4	Cubs, 7‍–‍2	Cubs; 894‍–‍830‍–‍19	
1977	Cardinals	11‍–‍7	Cardinals, 7‍–‍2	Cubs, 5‍–‍4	Cubs; 901‍–‍841‍–‍19	
1978	Cubs	15‍–‍3	Cubs, 8‍–‍1	Cubs, 7‍–‍2	Cubs; 916‍–‍844‍–‍19	Cubs win first 12 meetings of the season
1979	Cardinals	10‍–‍8	Cardinals, 6‍–‍3	Cubs, 5‍–‍4	Cubs; 924‍–‍854‍–‍19	

1980s (Cardinals, 89–81–1)

Season	Season series		at St. Louis Cardinals	at Chicago Cubs	Overall series	Notes
1980	Tie	9‍–‍9	Cubs, 6‍–‍3	Cardinals, 6‍–‍3	Cubs; 933‍–‍863‍–‍19	
1981	Cubs	5‍–‍4‍–‍1	Tie, 3‍–‍3	Cubs, 2‍–‍1‍–‍1	Cubs; 938‍–‍867‍–‍20	Strike-shortened season
1982	Cardinals	12‍–‍6	Cardinals, 6‍–‍3	Cardinals, 6‍–‍3	Cubs; 944‍–‍879‍–‍20	Cardinals win 1982 World Series
1983	Cubs	10‍–‍8	Cubs, 5‍–‍4	Cubs, 5‍–‍4	Cubs; 954‍–‍887‍–‍20	
1984	Cubs	13‍–‍5	Cubs, 6‍–‍3	Cubs, 7‍–‍2	Cubs; 967‍–‍892‍–‍20	Cubs win the "Sandberg Game" on June 23 on the strength of two Ryne Sandberg home runs in the 9th and 10th innings, both of which tied the game.
1985	Cardinals	14‍–‍4	Cardinals, 7‍–‍2	Cardinals, 7‍–‍2	Cubs; 971‍–‍906‍–‍20	Cardinals lose 1985 World Series
1986	Cubs	10‍–‍7	Cardinals, 5‍–‍4	Cubs, 6‍–‍2	Cubs; 981‍–‍913‍–‍20	
1987	Cardinals	12‍–‍6	Cardinals, 6‍–‍3	Cardinals, 6‍–‍3	Cubs; 987‍–‍925‍–‍20	Cardinals lose 1987 World Series
1988	Cardinals	11‍–‍7	Cardinals, 5‍–‍4	Cardinals, 6‍–‍3	Cubs; 994‍–‍936‍–‍20	
1989	Cubs	11‍–‍7	Cubs, 6‍–‍3	Cubs, 5‍–‍4	Cubs; 1,005‍–‍934‍–‍20	

1990s (Cubs, 71–67)

Season	Season series		at St. Louis Cardinals	at Chicago Cubs	Overall series	Notes	Ref.
1990	Cardinals	10‍–‍8	Cardinals, 5‍–‍4	Cardinals, 5‍–‍4	Cubs; 1,013‍–‍953‍–‍20		
1991	Cubs	10‍–‍8	Cardinals, 5‍–‍4	Cubs, 6‍–‍3	Cubs; 1,023‍–‍961‍–‍20		
1992	Cubs	11‍–‍7	Cubs, 5‍–‍4	Cubs, 6‍–‍3	Cubs; 1,034‍–‍968‍–‍20		
1993	Cubs	8‍–‍5	Cubs, 4‍–‍2	Cubs, 4‍–‍3	Cubs; 1,042‍–‍973‍–‍20	MLB expansion reduces series to 11‍–‍13 meetings per season.	
1994	Tie	5‍–‍5	Cubs, 4‍–‍3	Cardinals, 2‍–‍1	Cubs; 1,047‍–‍978‍–‍20	Strike-shortened season. Strike cancels postseason. MLB adds Wild Card, allowing for both teams to make the postseason in the same year.	
1995	Cubs	9‍–‍4	Cubs, 4‍–‍2	Cubs, 5‍–‍2	Cubs; 1,056‍–‍982‍–‍20		
1996	Cardinals	8‍–‍5	Cardinals, 5‍–‍2	Tie, 3‍–‍3	Cubs; 1,061‍–‍990‍–‍20		
1997	Cardinals	8‍–‍4	Cardinals, 4‍–‍2	Cardinals, 4‍–‍2	Cubs; 1,065‍–‍998‍–‍20		
1998	Cardinals	7‍–‍4	Cardinals, 5‍–‍0	Cubs, 4‍–‍2	Cubs; 1,069‍–‍1,005‍–‍20	McGwire-Sosa home run record chase	
1999	Cubs	7‍–‍5	Tie, 3‍–‍3	Cubs, 4‍–‍2	Cubs; 1,076‍–‍1,010‍–‍20		

2000s (Cardinals, 85–81)

Season	Season series		at St. Louis Cardinals	at Chicago Cubs	Overall series	Notes	Ref.
2000	Cardinals	10‍–‍3	Cardinals, 7‍–‍0	Tie, 3‍–‍3	Cubs; 1,079‍–‍1,020‍–‍20		
2001	Cubs	9‍–‍8	Cardinals, 5‍–‍2	Cubs, 7‍–‍3	Cubs; 1,088‍–‍1,028‍–‍20	MLB changed to an unbalanced schedule in 2001, resulting in 15-19 meetings per year. Cardinals win 13 straight home meetings from October 1999 to June 2001	
2002	Cardinals	12‍–‍6	Cardinals, 8‍–‍1	Cubs, 5‍–‍4	Cubs; 1,094‍–‍1,040‍–‍20		
2003	Cardinals	9‍–‍8	Cardinals, 5‍–‍2	Cubs, 6‍–‍4	Cubs; 1,102‍–‍1,049‍–‍20		
2004	Cardinals	11‍–‍8	Cardinals, 6‍–‍4	Cardinals, 5‍–‍4	Cubs; 1,110‍–‍1,060‍–‍20	Cardinals lose 2004 World Series.	
2005	Cubs	10‍–‍6	Cubs, 5‍–‍3	Cubs, 5‍–‍3	Cubs; 1,120‍–‍1,066‍–‍20		
2006	Cubs	11‍–‍8	Cardinals, 6‍–‍3	Cubs, 8‍–‍2	Cubs; 1,131‍–‍1,074‍–‍20	Cardinals open Busch Stadium, win 2006 World Series	
2007	Cubs	11‍–‍5	Cubs, 7‍–‍2	Cubs, 4‍–‍3	Cubs; 1,142‍–‍1,079‍–‍20		
2008	Cubs	9‍–‍6	Cubs, 5‍–‍4	Cubs, 4‍–‍2	Cubs; 1,151‍–‍1,085‍–‍20		
2009	Cardinals	10‍–‍6	Cardinals, 7‍–‍2	Cubs, 4‍–‍3	Cubs; 1,157‍–‍1,095‍–‍20		

2010s (Cardinals, 94–90)

Season	Season series		at St. Louis Cardinals	at Chicago Cubs	Overall series	Notes	Ref.
2010	Cubs	9‍–‍6	Cubs, 5‍–‍1	Cardinals, 5‍–‍4	Cubs; 1,166‍–‍1,101‍–‍20		
2011	Cardinals	10‍–‍5	Cardinals, 7‍–‍2	Tie, 3‍–‍3	Cubs; 1,171‍–‍1,111‍–‍20	Cardinals win 2011 World Series	
2012	Cardinals	10‍–‍7	Cardinals, 6‍–‍2	Cubs, 5‍–‍4	Cubs; 1,178‍–‍1,121‍–‍20		
2013	Cardinals	12‍–‍7	Cardinals, 7‍–‍3	Cardinals, 5‍–‍4	Cubs; 1,185‍–‍1,133‍–‍20	MLB realignment results in 19 meetings per season starting in 2013. Cardinals lose 2013 World Series.	
2014	Cardinals	10‍–‍9	Cardinals, 6‍–‍4	Cubs, 5‍–‍4	Cubs; 1,194‍–‍1,143‍–‍20		
2015	Cardinals	11‍–‍8	Cardinals, 7‍–‍3	Cubs, 5‍–‍4	Cubs; 1,202‍–‍1,154‍–‍20	Cardinals win 100 games, Cubs win 97 games, Two of the three best records in MLB that season (along with NL Central rival Pittsburgh).	
2015 NLDS	Cubs	3‍–‍1	Tie, 1‍–‍1	Cubs, 2‍–‍0	Cubs; 1,205‍–‍1,155‍–‍20	Only postseason meeting between the two teams since Cardinals joined the National League in 1892.	
2016	Cubs	10‍–‍9	Cubs, 6‍–‍3	Cardinals, 6‍–‍4	Cubs; 1,215‍–‍1,164‍–‍20	Cubs win 2016 World Series, their first title since 1908.	
2017	Cubs	14‍–‍5	Cubs, 6‍–‍4	Cubs, 8‍–‍1	Cubs; 1,229‍–‍1,169‍–‍20		
2018	Cardinals	10‍–‍9	Cardinals, 6‍–‍3	Cubs, 6‍–‍4	Cubs; 1,238‍–‍1,179‍–‍20		
2019	Cardinals	10‍–‍9	Cardinals, 6‍–‍3	Cubs, 6‍–‍4	Cubs; 1,247‍–‍1,189‍–‍20		

2020s (Cardinals, 52–48)

Season	Season series		at St. Louis Cardinals	at Chicago Cubs	Overall series	Notes	Ref.
2020	Tie	5‍–‍5	no games	Tie, 5‍–‍5	Cubs; 1,252‍–‍1,194‍–‍20	Season shortened to 60 games due to COVID-19 pandemic. The August 7–9 series in St. Louis was postponed as a result of an outbreak among the Cardinals. All three make-up games were played at Wrigley Field, with St. Louis batting as the home team.	
2021	Cardinals	10‍–‍9	Tie, 5‍–‍5	Cardinals, 5‍–‍4	Cubs; 1,261‍–‍1,204‍–‍20		
2022	Cardinals	13‍–‍6	Cardinals, 7‍–‍2	Cardinals, 6‍–‍4	Cubs; 1,267‍–‍1,217‍–‍20	Last year of 19 division games.	
2023	Cubs	8‍–‍5	Cubs, 4‍–‍2	Cubs, 4‍–‍3	Cubs; 1,275‍–‍1,222‍–‍20	Includes a two-game series in London, counted as home games for St. Louis	
2024	Cardinals	7‍–‍6	Cardinals, 4‍–‍2	Cubs, 4‍–‍3	Cubs; 1,281‍–‍1,229‍–‍20		
2025	Cubs	8‍–‍5	Cardinals, 4‍–‍3	Cubs, 5‍–‍1	Cubs; 1,289‍–‍1,234‍–‍20		
2026	Cardinals	7‍–‍6	Cubs, 4‍–‍3	Cardinals, 4‍–‍2	Cubs; 1,295‍–‍1,241‍–‍20		

Summary of Results

Season	Season series		at St. Louis Cardinals	at Chicago Cubs	at other	Notes
Regular Season	Cubs	1,287‍–‍1,233‍–‍19	Cardinals, 678‍–‍570‍–‍11	Cubs, 717‍–‍555‍–‍8		
Postseason games	Tie	8‍–‍8‍–‍1	Cardinals, 4‍–‍1‍–‍1	Cubs, 5‍–‍3	Cubs, 2‍–‍1	Games 5 through 7 of the 1885 World Series were played in Pittsburgh or Cincinnati, away for both teams.
Postseason Series	Tie	1‍–‍1‍–‍1	Cardinals, 1‍–‍0‍–‍2	Cubs, 2‍–‍1	Cubs, 1‍–‍0	NLDS: 2015; World Series: 1885, 1886
Regular and postseason	Cubs	1,295‍–‍1,241‍–‍20	Cardinals, 682‍–‍571‍–‍12	Cubs, 722‍–‍558‍–‍8	Cubs, 2‍–‍1	

== Territorial rights ==
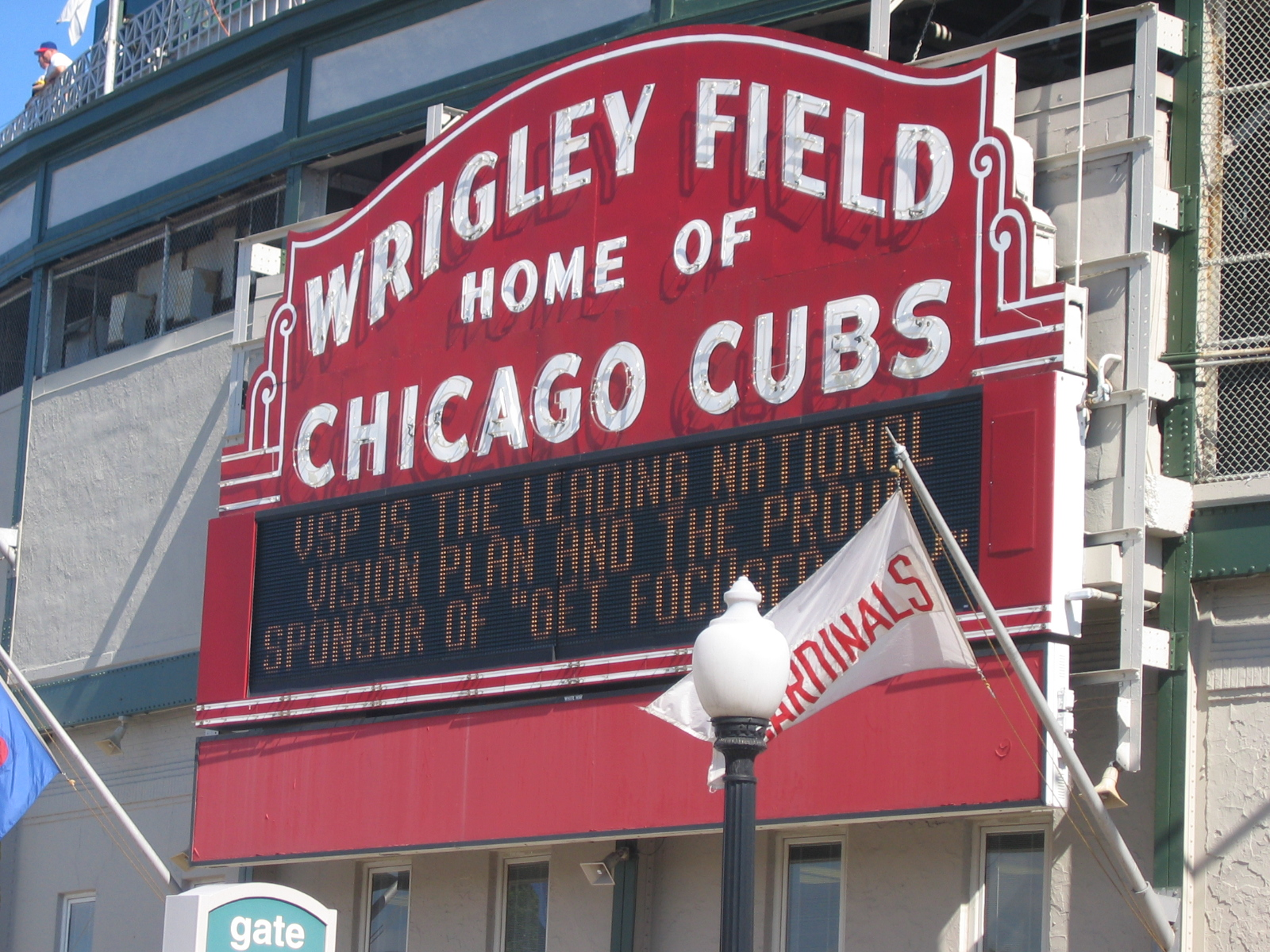
Wrigley Field and the Cubs play host to the rival St. Louis Cardinals 6 or 7 games a season

In his book Three Nights in August, Buzz Bissinger compared the Cardinals–Cubs rivalry to another famous rivalry in MLB: "The Red Sox and Yankees is a tabloid-filled soap opera about money and ego and sound bites. But the Cubs and Cardinals are about... geography and territorial rights."

One of the "territories" in question is central Illinois. The region is well within the daytime footprint of Cardinals radio flagship KMOX, and has also been within the footprint of the Cubs' numerous radio outlets–WGN until 2015, WBBM for the 2015 season, then WSCR since 2016. All four radio stations are traditional "clear channel" AM radio stations that blanket most of the Midwest and beyond at night.

The Cardinals were the southernmost team in the National League for most of the first half of the 20th century, and traditionally claimed huge parts of the South and lower Midwest in their territory before Major League expansion. The Cubs claimed most of the Upper Midwest as their home territory. This was the case even when the Braves played in Milwaukee from 1953 to 1966, and has continued after the Brewers, were placed in Milwaukee, and the Twins in Minnesota, as those teams then played in the American League. Before the majors expanded westward in the 1950s and 1960s, the two teams fought for fans in the Western states. While the Cardinals were the westernmost team in the National League, the Cubs drew on the large numbers of Midwestern expatriates who either lived or vacationed in the West.

Loyalties to the two teams divided friends, families, and co-workers, and shaped the locals in various ways, as George Will noted in a 1998 commencement address at Washington University in St. Louis: "I grew up in Champaign, Illinois, midway between Chicago and St. Louis. At an age too tender for life-shaping decisions, I made one. While all my friends were becoming Cardinals fans, I became a Cub fan. My friends, happily rooting for Stan Musial, Red Schoendienst, and other great Redbirds, grew up cheerfully convinced that the world is a benign place, so of course, they became liberals. Rooting for the Cubs in the late 1940s and early 1950s, I became gloomy, pessimistic, morose, dyspeptic and conservative. It helped out of course that the Cubs last won the World Series in 1908, which is two years before Mark Twain and Tolstoy died. But that means, class of 1998, that the Cubs are in the 89th year of their rebuilding effort, and remember, any team can have a bad moment."

The rivalry between the two teams is an important regionalism in the Netflix show Ozark. In order to establish Jason Bateman's character, Marty Byrde, as a Chicago native who moved to Lake Ozark, Missouri, the show writers included several references to the rivalry through the first season. This often manifests as negative comments from Byrde to a southern Missouri Cardinals fan. One says to him "I was raised to hate the Cubs," to which he fires back "And I was raised to hate the Cardinals."

== Notable personalities ==
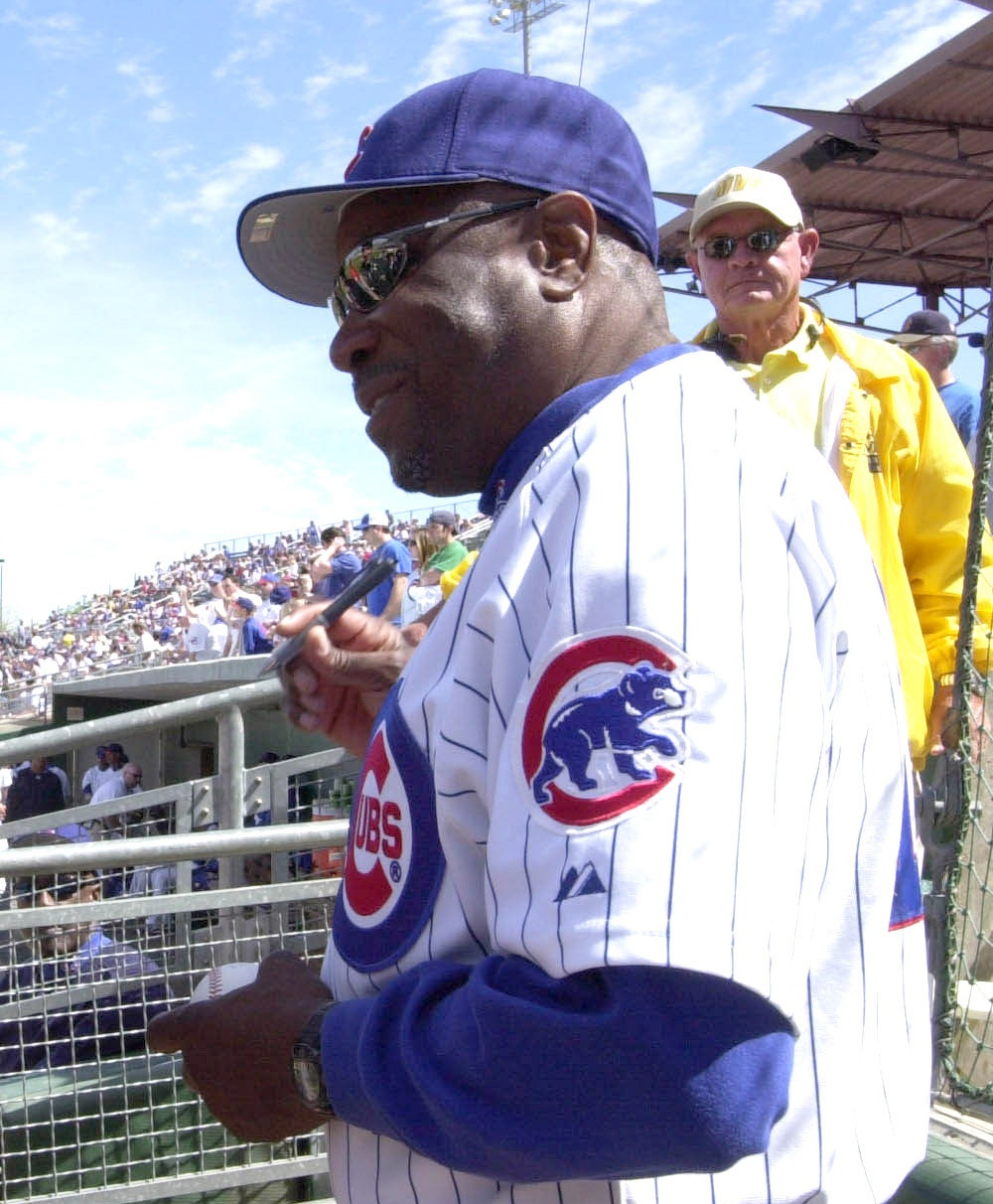
Dusty Baker, manager of the Chicago Cubs (2003–2006)

Many players have played for both teams, including Hall of Famer Rogers Hornsby, who holds several single season hitting records for both clubs. Notably, Hall of Famer Lou Brock was traded from the Cubs to the Cardinals early in his career for pitcher Ernie Broglio. This is widely considered one of the most one-sided trades in baseball history. Other Hall of Famers who played/managed with both clubs include Grover Cleveland Alexander, Clark Griffith, Burleigh Grimes, Bruce Sutter, Roger Bresnahan, Dizzy Dean, Dennis Eckersley, Rabbit Maranville, Hoyt Wilhelm, and Leo Durocher.

Legendary announcer Harry Caray began his career in St. Louis, broadcasting on KMOX radio for 24 seasons, before moving to Chicago in 1971, announcing 11 seasons for the White Sox before moving to the North Side and becoming a staple of WGN radio and television broadcasts for the Cubs from 1982 until his death before the 1998 season. Grandson Chip Caray succeeded Harry on the Cubs' television broadcasts in 1998, serving in the role until 2005 to take the same job with the Atlanta Braves, joining father Skip Caray on the broadcast team. In 2023, Chip left the Braves to take over the play-by-play job with the Cardinals.

The rivalry between the two clubs intensified following the hiring of Dusty Baker to manage the Cubs following in 2003. In 2002, when Baker was managing the San Francisco Giants, he and Cardinals manager Tony La Russa had run-ins during that year's National League Championship Series, with the animosity carrying over to Baker's tenure with the Cubs. According to Baker, part of the intensity stems from the close relationship of the two. "It's very intense...When you play 18 times against a team that's had a long-time rivalry, and my former manager and my former confidant, that just increases things." Baker played for La Russa in 1986 as a member of the Oakland Athletics.

Some say that the feud between the two managers added to the rivalry between the two teams. "Both managers are fiercely protective of their players. Both believe in old-school baseball protocol. Neither will sit by idly and watch an opponent show up their team. Both are fierce competitors with enormous pride…. Fans don’t usually buy tickets to watch managers manage . . . but this tactical showdown added something to the Cubs-Cards series."

After the Cubs fired Baker in 2006, they replaced him with Lou Piniella. Coincidentally, Piniella and La Russa both grew up in Tampa and faced each other in the 1990 World Series as managers of the Cincinnati Reds and Oakland Athletics, respectively.

== Statistical comparison ==
As of the end of the 2023 MLB Season

=== Championships and Playoff Appearances ===
Category	Cardinals	Cubs
World Series championships	11	3
League pennants	23	17
Division championships	15	8
Wild Card berths	5	3

=== Award winners ===
As of the end of the 2023 MLB Season

Category	Cardinals	Cubs
MVP	21	11
Cy Young	3	5
Rookie of the Year	6	6
Manager of the Year	4	4
Gold Glove	95	47
Silver Slugger	30	25

=== Single season records ===
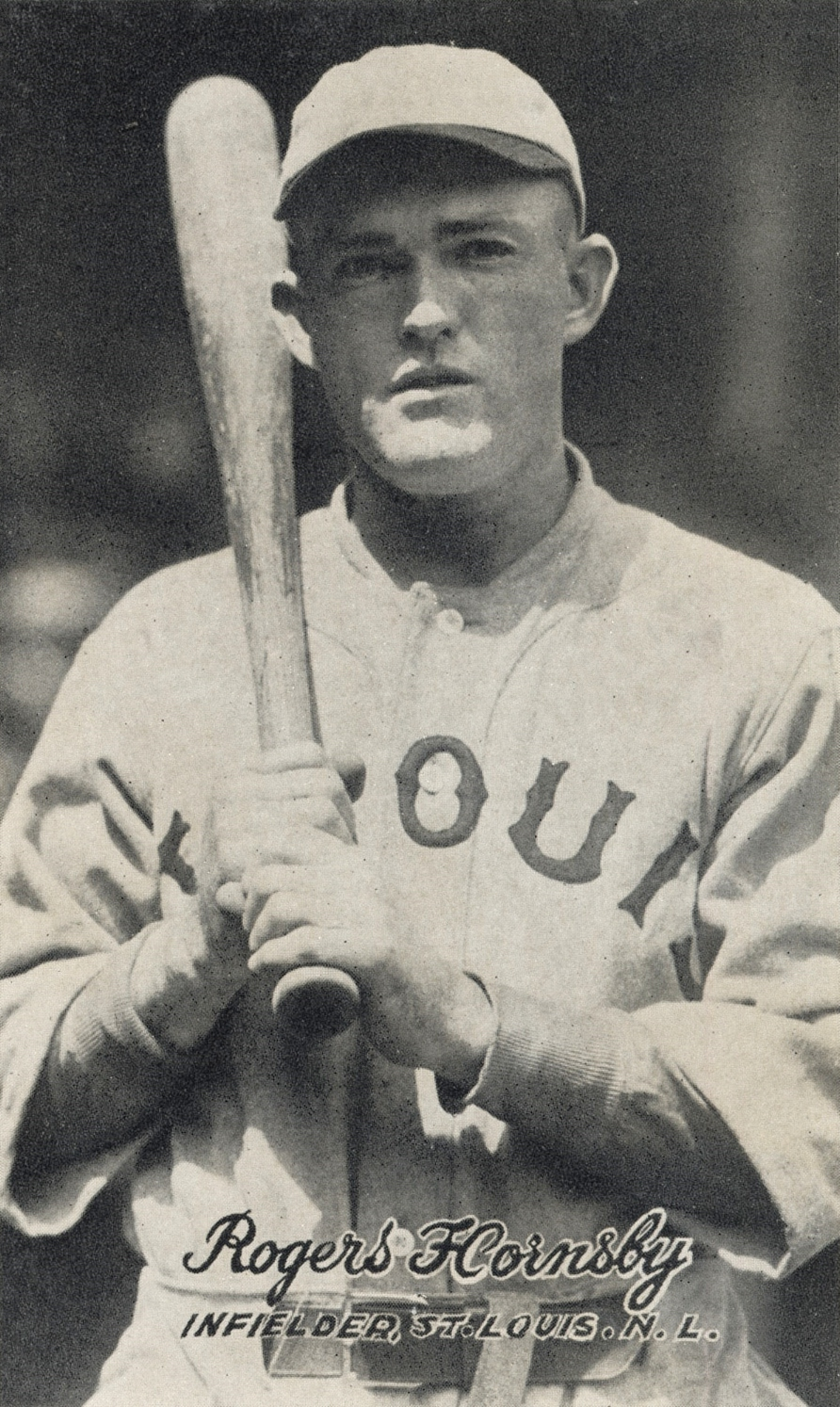
Rogers Hornsby played for the St. Louis Cardinals 1915–1926 & 1933 and with the Chicago Cubs 1929–1932. Hornsby owns the single season record for both franchises in hits and runs.

Category	Cardinals	Cubs
Home runs	Mark McGwire, 70 (1998)	Sammy Sosa, 66 (1998)
Runs batted in	Joe Medwick, 154 (1937)	Hack Wilson, 191 (1930) (MLB record)
Batting average	Tip O'Neill, .435 (1887)	Ross Barnes, .429 (1876)
Hits	Rogers Hornsby, 250 (1922)	Rogers Hornsby, 229 (1929)
Runs	Tip O'Neill, 167 (1887)	Rogers Hornsby, 156 (1929)
Doubles	Joe Medwick, 64 (1936)	Billy Herman, 57 (1935 & 1936)
Triples	Perry Werden, 29 (1893)	Vic Saier and Frank Schulte, 21 (1913 & 1911)
Extra Base Hits	Stan Musial, 103 (1948)	Sammy Sosa, 103 (2001)
Grand Slams	Albert Pujols, 5 (2009)	Ernie Banks, 5 (1955)
On-Base Percentage	Rogers Hornsby, .507 (1924)	King Kelly, .483 (1886)
Slugging Percentage	Rogers Hornsby, .756 (1925)	Sammy Sosa, .737 (2001)
Stolen bases	Arlie Latham, 129 (1887)	Bill Lange, 84 (1896)
Hitting streak	Rogers Hornsby, 33 games (1922)	Bill Dahlen, 42 games (1894)
Strikeouts	Tyler O'Neill, 168 (2021)	Kris Bryant, 199 (2015)
Walks	Mark McGwire, 162 (1998)	Jimmy Sheckard, 147 (1911)
Pitching wins	Silver King 45, (1888)	John Clarkson, 53 (1885)
Pitching strikeouts	Jack Stivetts, 289 (1890)	Bill Hutchison, 314 (1892)
Pitching ERA	Bob Gibson, 1.12 (1968)	Mordecai Brown, 1.04 (1906)
Pitching Saves	Ryan Helsley, 49 (2024)	Randy Myers, 53 (1993)

=== Hall of Fame plaques with team logo ===
Cardinals – (13)

- Lou Brock (1985)
- Dizzy Dean (1953)
- Bob Gibson (1981)
- Whitey Herzog (2010)
- Rogers Hornsby (1947)
- Stan Musial (1969)
- Scott Rolen (2023)
- Red Schoendienst (1989)
- Ted Simmons (2020)
- Enos Slaughter (1985)
- Ozzie Smith (2002)
- Billy Southworth (2008)
- Bruce Sutter (2006)

Cubs – (12)

- Ernie Banks (1977)
- Frank Chance (1946)
- Kiki Cuyler (1968)
- Johnny Evers (1946)
- Gabby Hartnett (1955)
- Billy Herman (1975)
- Ferguson Jenkins (1991)
- Ryne Sandberg (2005)
- Ron Santo (2012)
- Lee Smith (2019)
- Billy Williams (1987)
- Hack Wilson (1979)

== See also ==
- Major League Baseball rivalries
- Blackhawks–Blues rivalry – equivalent in the National Hockey League
- Bears–Cardinals rivalry
- 1998 Major League Baseball home run record chase
