= West Side Park =

Two former baseball parks in Chicago, Illinois

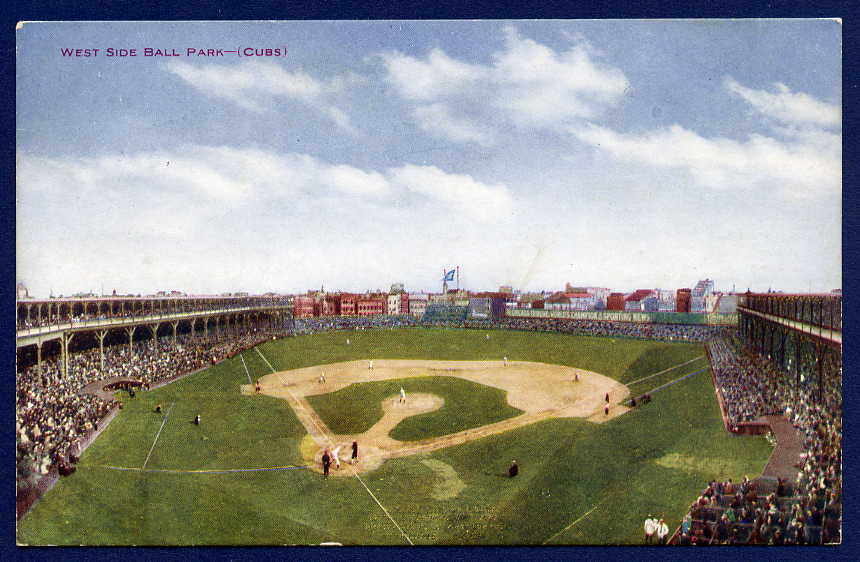
- Postcard of the ballpark in 1909
- Interactive map of West Side Park
- Address: Chicago; United States
- Coordinates: 41°52′29″N 87°39′38″W
- Owner: Chicago Cubs
- Capacity: 16,000

Construction
- Groundbreaking: 1885
- Opened: June 6, 1885
- Closed: After 1915
- Demolished: 1920

Tenants
- Chicago Cubs (NL) (1885–1891, 1893–1915); Chicago Maroons (minor league) (1888)

West Side Park was the name used for two different ballparks that formerly stood in Chicago, Illinois. They were both home fields of the team now known as the Chicago Cubs of the National League. Both ballparks hosted baseball championships. The latter of the two parks, where the franchise played for nearly a quarter century, was the home of the first two world champion Cubs teams (1907 and 1908), the team that posted the best winning percentage in Major League Baseball history and won the most games in National League history (1906), the only cross-town World Series in Chicago (1906), and the immortalized Tinker to Evers to Chance double-play combo. Both ballparks were primarily constructed of wood.

== The first West Side Park (1885–1891) ==
The initial stadium was the club's home beginning in 1885, succeeding Lakefront Park. Although the park's useful life turned out to be as short as the ball club's stay at the Lakefront (seven years), it was also memorable, as the team won back-to-back National League pennants in its first two seasons there.

The park was located on a small block bounded by Congress (north, left field), Loomis (west, center field), Harrison (south, right field) and Throop (east, home plate) Streets. The elongated shape of the block lent a bathtub-like shape to the park, with foul lines reportedly as short as 210 feet (64 m). The stadium held roughly 10,000 fans. In addition to the diamond, the park held a bicycle track which encircled the playing field, at the height of the contemporary bicycle craze.

The lumber from the stands at the lakefront ballpark was disassembled and reconfigured as the new stands at West Side Park.

The Cubs (then known as the White Stockings) had had to secure a new property after 1884, and it took longer than anticipated. The season began on April 30, a month later than it does today, for a 112-game schedule, 50 fewer games than today's major-league schedule. The club spent the first five-plus weeks of the 1885 season on the road, and the park was finally opened on June 6 with a victory over the St. Louis Maroons, late of the Union Association. Despite being "wanderers" early in the season, the powerful Chicago club, under player-manager Cap Anson, came home with an 18–6 record. They would sweep a four-game set in their first homestand and romp through the league schedule, finishing at 87–25. The only team that gave them any problem was the New York Giants, who won 10 of the clubs' 16 meetings and finished just two games behind Chicago in the standings. If projected to a modern 162-game schedule, that translates to 125 and 123 wins, respectively, in a very lopsided league (the third-place club finished 30 games back).

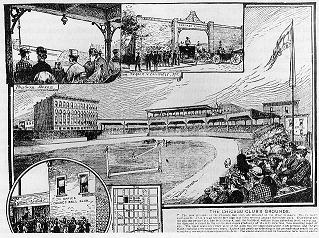
First West Side Park c. 1885

Chicago captured the National League pennant that season and also went on to win the league crown in 1886. The site saw postseason action those two years, as the White Stockings squared off in 19th-century World Series play against the St. Louis Cardinals, then playing in the rival American Association and known as the St. Louis Browns. The championships of the 1880s were disorganized in comparison to the modern World Series, exemplified by the 1885 World Series, which ended in dispute with no clear winner. The 1886 World Series was more conventional, and was won by the Browns. Those matchups were the first on-field confrontations of the Cubs and Cardinals clubs, which remains one of baseball's strongest rivalries today.

The site also saw "bonus baseball" in 1887, as a neutral site for Game 14 of that year's unique 15-game "traveling" World Series between the Browns and the Detroit Wolverines. In 1891 the team split its schedule between West Side Park and South Side Park (II). The first West Side Park was abandoned after the 1891 season, with the team playing at home exclusively on the South Side in 1892.

The site of the first West Side Park is now occupied by the Chicago World Language Academy, whose address is 1340 West Harrison.

=== Capacity and dimensions of the first West Side Park ===
| Years | Capacity |
|---|---|
| 1885–1891 | 6,000 |

| Dimension | Distance | Notes |
|---|---|---|
| Left field | unknown | |
| Center field | 560 ft (170 m) | |
| Right field | 216 ft (66 m) ? | see below |

Information about the dimensions is contradictory in local newspapers. In the reports of the opening game of June 6, 1885, when Chicago player George Gore homered near the right field corner, the St. Louis Maroons complained (or "kicked", in popular slang of the time) that the foul line was shorter than the minimum allowed, 210 ft (64 m). A yard tape measure was then used to painstakingly measure the distance while the crowd booed. The exact result was reported differently. One paper quoted Chicago club owner Albert Spalding as stating the distance to be 216 ft (66 m), implicitly confirmed by the measurement. Another paper reported that the distance was found to be 225 ft (69 m).

However, upon the announcement of West Side Park (II) in 1893, the new park's foul lines were stated to be 340 ft (100 m), "130 ft (40 m) further than the old west side fence." That would indicate distances of 210 ft (64 m) at West Side Park (I).

== Gallery 1 ==
1885 diagram

1886 Robinson Fire Map diagram

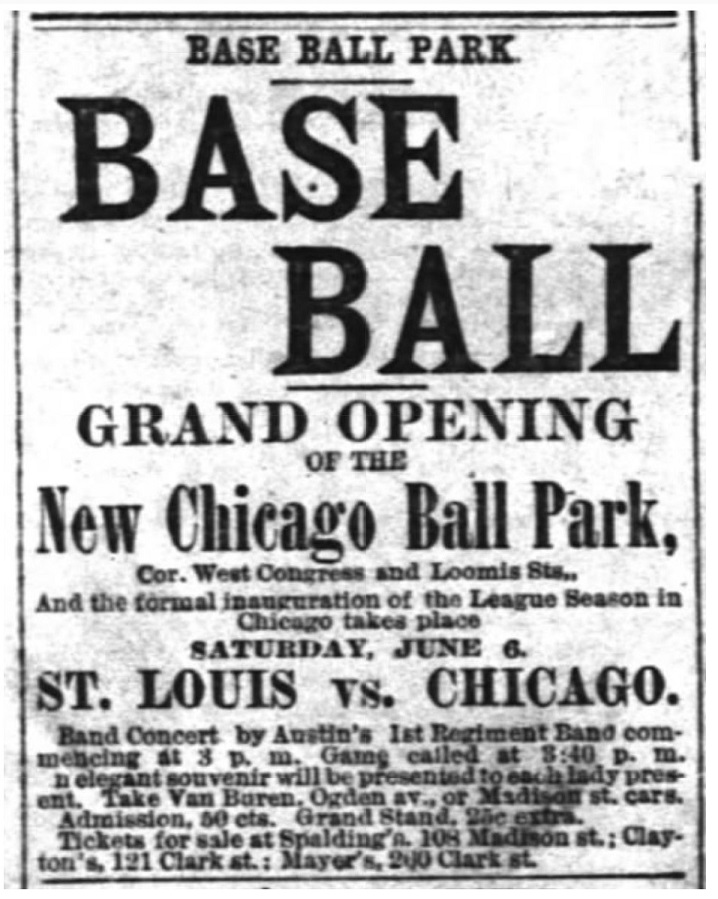
Newspaper ad for opening game of West Side Park (I)

== The second West Side Park (1893–1915) ==
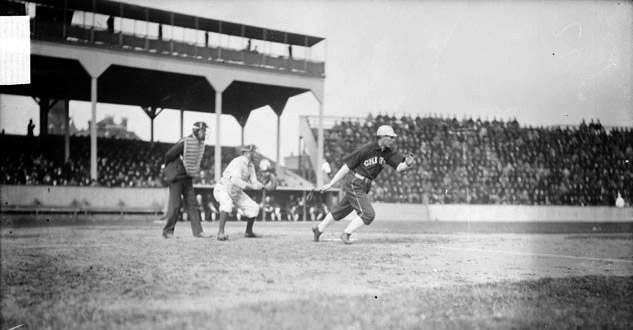
Action at a Cubs-Sox exhibition series, 1905

The second West Side Park was a few blocks west-southwest of the first one, on a larger block bounded by Taylor, Wood, Polk and Lincoln (renamed Wolcott in 1939) Streets. It was located at 41°52′13″N 87°40′21″W.

A ballpark on the site was first constructed in 1888 for the Garden City Athletic Club. (Chicago is "The Garden City".) It was also the part-time home of the Chicago Maroons minor league club that year. The Maroons' first game on the new lot came on May 5, 1888. During the next few years, the ballpark hosted a variety of Chicago City League ball games and other events.

On May 14, 1893, the National League club played their first game at West Side Park (II). During May and June, they split their schedule with South Side Park (II), playing Sunday games on the West Side and weekday games on the South Side. By mid-summer they had abandoned the South Side park and moved into the West Side park full-time.

Home plate for this ballpark was in the northwest corner of the property, toward the Polk and Lincoln intersection. The right field fence paralleled Taylor, with flat apartments between the alley behind the right field area, and Taylor itself. There were also flats across Wood Street to the east, behind left field, giving the park (for a few years, at least) a degree of the ambiance that Wrigley Field would later be famous for. Cook County Hospital was across Polk Street to the north, behind third base. Like the first West Side ballpark, the new facility was restricted by the streets around it, creating a rectangular playing area.

The field layout was reported in the Inter Ocean on April 16, 1893: "The diamond is 90 feet (27 m) from the grand stand, and the right and left field fences are 340 feet (100 m) from the home plate, 130 feet (40 m) further than the old west side fence. The distance from the home plate to the extreme center field is 560 feet (170 m). The club will play all their Sunday games at the new grounds during the World's Fair, and after the fair is closed will probably play all their games there."

An artist's conception of the new field includes a rooftop tier of private seating on the grandstand, and roofed bleachers beyond first and third base. Photographs from the early 1900s suggest those plans were left dormant until starting in 1905, when the team began playing well and expansion of the ballpark seating was begun.

Although the 340-560-340 sounds symmetrical, the left field side was much more spacious, and the distance to center was actually very deep left-center, possibly the far corner of the property.

The original layout of the park seated about 12,500 patrons. As with other parks of the era, fans were often permitted to stand along the outer perimeter of the playing field itself. When the team began playing winning ball under Frank Chance, overflow crowds became more frequent.

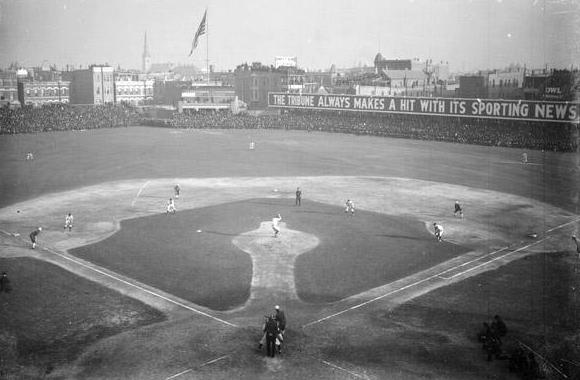
Action in the 1906 World Series

On August 5, 1894, during its first full season as home to the Cubs (at that point known as the Colts), West Side Park suffered severe damage from fire during a game against the Cincinnati Reds. As the fire spread through the first-base side stands, panicked fans trying to escape pressed up against the barbed wire fence separating them from the playing field. Only quick action by several players in wrenching the fence open averted a major tragedy. The burnt stands were simply roped off, and the season resumed the next day, with the burnt area fenced off, and the spectators sitting on the left side of the diamond. Despite that near-disaster, the club rebuilt the burnt portion out of wood.

One highlight, albeit for the visitors, occurred on July 13, 1896, when Philadelphia Phillies outfielder/firstbaseman Ed Delahanty smacked four home runs in one game, only the second player to do so. In contrast to Bobby Lowe's feat two years earlier, which was aided by a short foul line, two of Delahanty's were inside-the-park. After Delahanty's third, center fielder Bill Lange drew a laugh by calling "time", stationing himself in deep-deep center, near the clubhouse, seemingly a mile away, and then waving the pitcher to continue. Delahanty then got the laugh on Lange by knocking it between the clubhouse and the fence, again circling the bases while Lange scurried for the ball. The normally partisan home fans cheered Delahanty's effort. Chicago got the last laugh, winning the game, 9–8.

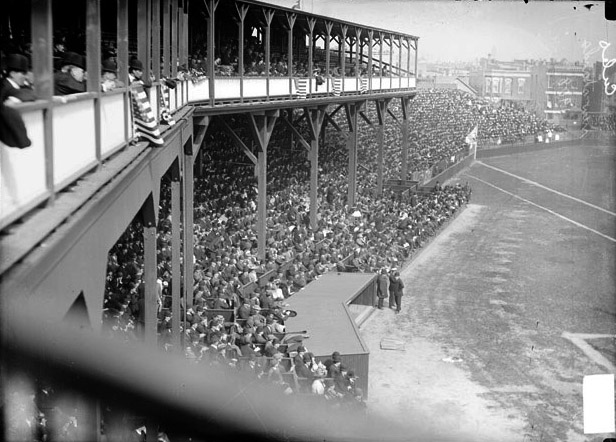
Expanded left-side grandstand in 1908

As the park entered the new century, it featured a small covered grandstand behind home plate. Behind the home plate stands, the team and ticket offices were housed in a fairly ornate two-story brick building topped with statues of baseball players. Uncovered bleachers extended along both foul lines and into left field. Beyond left-center field, the bleachers gave way to a small clubhouse. The right-field bleachers were only nine rows deep, sitting underneath a free-standing billboard that ran above the length of the bleachers. The billboard frequently featured large ads for the sports pages and the sportswriters of local newspapers such as the Chicago Tribune and the Chicago Daily News. A scoreboard was located on the extreme right end of the billboard, toward the right field corner. Much like today at Wrigley Field, several of the rooftops beyond the outfield bleachers offered bleacher seating of their own, at least for a few years.

The second West Side Park was the home of the Cubs' most successful teams of the 20th century. From 1906 through 1910, the Cubs won four National League pennants and two World Series championships. The 1906 World Series between the Cubs and the Chicago White Sox featured the first cross-town matchup in Series history. Although the Cubs had one of the most successful seasons in major league history, winning 116 contests against just 36 losses, they were defeated by the light-hitting White Sox four games to two. The Cubs finally brought a championship to West Side Park the following year when they swept the Detroit Tigers after ending the first contest in a tie. In 1908, West Side Park became the home of the first repeat world champions when the Cubs again bested the Tigers. After a one-year absence, the Cubs returned to the Series in 1910, only to lose in five games to the Philadelphia Athletics. The 1908 championship turned out to be the franchise's last World Series championship until 2016, ending a staggering 108-year drought for the franchise.

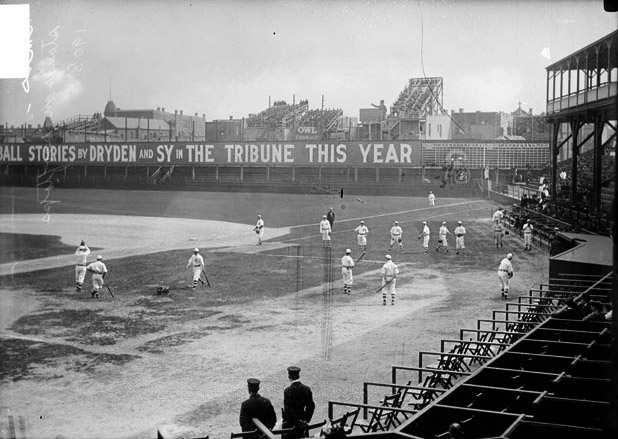
Right field area and rooftop bleachers in 1908

The ballpark expanded with the club's rising fortunes. For 1905, several rows of private box seats were built on top of the original grandstand roof behind home plate. That same year saw the construction of a new two-story brick clubhouse structure, fronted by columns, out in far left-center. After just two seasons, jury-box bleachers were built directly in front of and over the clubhouse. During the 1908 season, the bleachers along the first and third-base lines were gradually covered and topped by more private box seating.

By the early 1910s the wooden ballpark was showing its age, in large part due to neglect by Charles Murphy, the unpopular owner of the Cubs (one of whose alternate, media-driven nicknames was the unflattering "Murphy's Spuds"). In 1910, the neighborhood view beyond the nearby right field bleachers was blocked off by an enormous billboard. In 1912, the more distant left field view was similarly obstructed by a large billboard, which also served as the new scoreboard. The enclosure of the park was completed with the installment of billboards in dead center. At this time, the jury box bleachers in left-center field were removed, adding to the new claustrophobic feel of the outfield. With gambling becoming an increasing problem in baseball, starting in 1911 the playing field was adorned with large signs (as with some other major league ballparks) reminding both fans and players, "No Betting Allowed." Additionally, the dilapidated park found itself competing unsuccessfully with new steel-and-concrete baseball venues. The Chicago White Sox inaugurated Comiskey Park in 1910. Four years later, the upstart Federal League placed a franchise on the North Side and began play in Weeghman Park. By 1915, the Cubs were the third most popular team in a three-team city.

When the Federal League collapsed after the 1915 season, Charles Weeghman, owner of the now-defunct Chicago Whales, was allowed to buy a substantial interest in the Cubs. One of his first acts was to abandon West Side Park and move the Cubs to Weeghman Park for the 1916 season. Weeghman Park survives today as Wrigley Field.

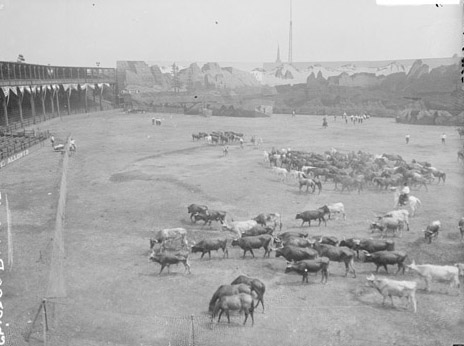
West Side Park hosting Buffalo Bill's Wild West in 1916, the year after the Cubs moved across town to Weeghman Park

One of the few items the Cubs took with them, besides normal operational properties, was a set of large letters comprising a sign that had run across the back of the grandstand and was to be read from the outside of the park: "Chicago National League Ball Park". This sign was placed along the top of the Weeghman Park wall bordering Sheffield Avenue, visible to everyone in the park, and of course reading backwards to the spectators. This oddity lasted a few years at Weeghman / Cubs Park until it was brought down during an early remodeling.

West Side Park continued to host semipro and amateur baseball events for a few years. It even served as a setting for Buffalo Bill's Wild West, thus converting the entire former ballfield into a different kind of "bull pen". The ballpark was torn down in 1920. Murphy, who still owned the property, sold the leftover lumber for scrap. He sold the property itself to the University of Illinois. The site is now occupied by the University of Illinois Medical Center.

This West Side Park was the only park that witnessed the Cubs as World Series Champions from 1908 to 2016. The Cubs won back-to-back titles here in 1907 and 1908. In June 1909, a flag-raising ceremony was held, celebrating the Cubs second consecutive World Series. Newspaper reporters commented that the crowd seemed less enthused than they had the previous summer, as if they were getting complacent: "Chicago fans are a peculiar lot... When the Cubs raised their title banner last year there were big doings. This year it seemed to be an old story."

=== Capacity and dimensions of the second West Side Park ===
| Years | Capacity |
|---|---|
| 1893–1904 | 13,000 |
| 1905–1907 | 14,200 |
| 1908–1915 | 16,000 |

| Dimension | Distance |
|---|---|
| Left Field | 340 ft (100 m) |
| Center Field | 560 ft (170 m) |
| Right Field | 340 ft (100 m) |

== Gallery 2 ==
1893 partial diagram

1893 sketch

Newspaper ad for opening game of West Side Park (II)

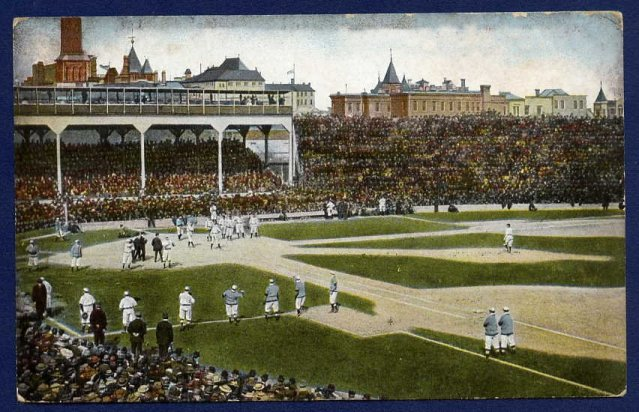
Colorized photo

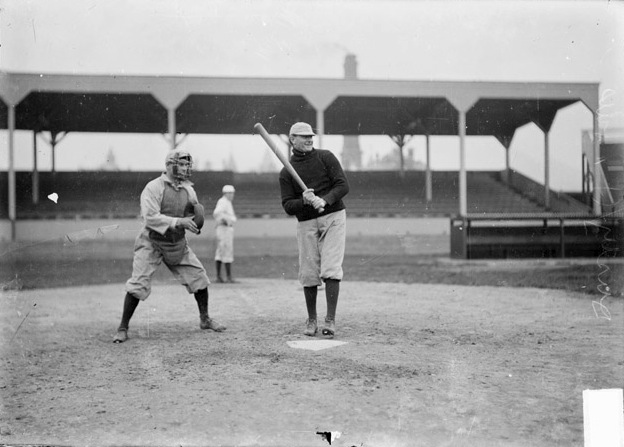
Dusty Rhoads bats for the Chicago Orphans, 1902.

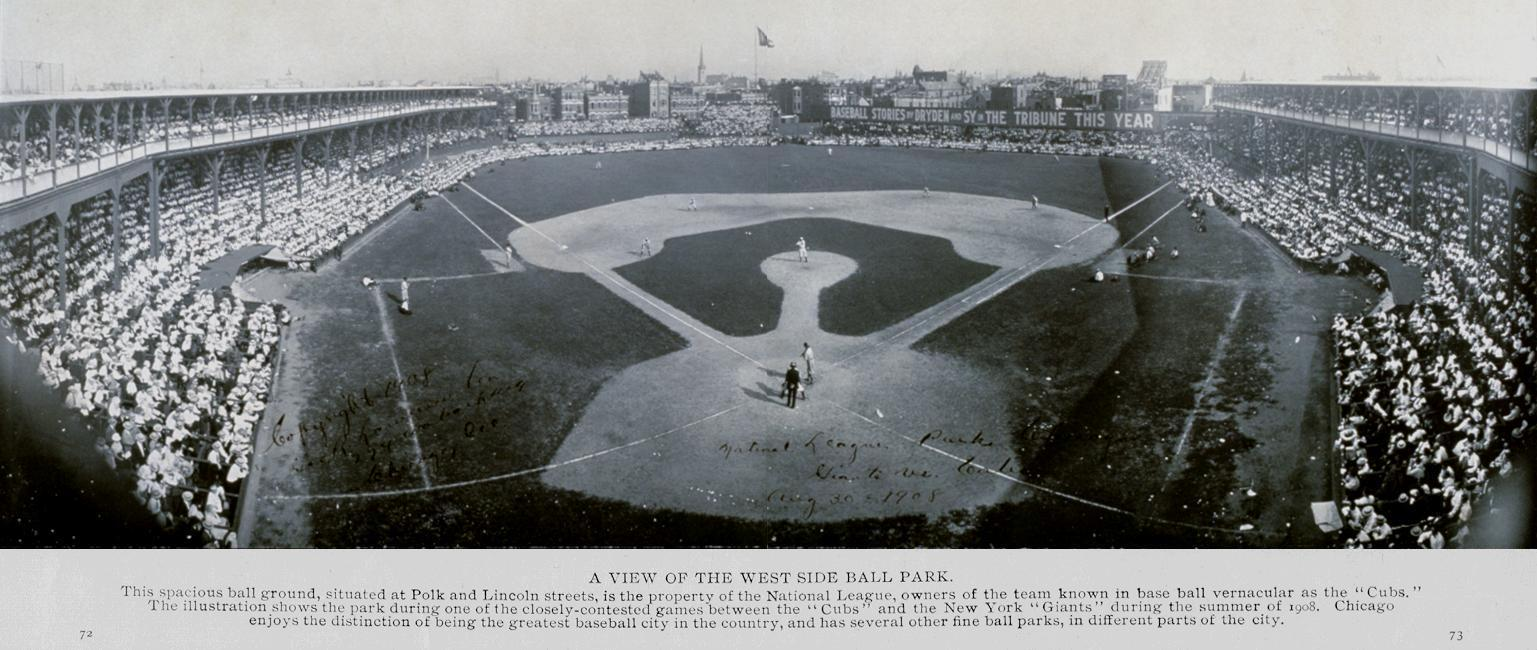
August 30, 1908 – Cubs vs. Giants

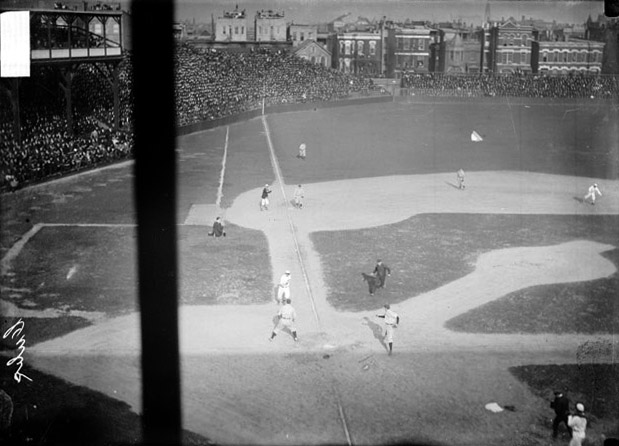
Cubs score a run in 1908.

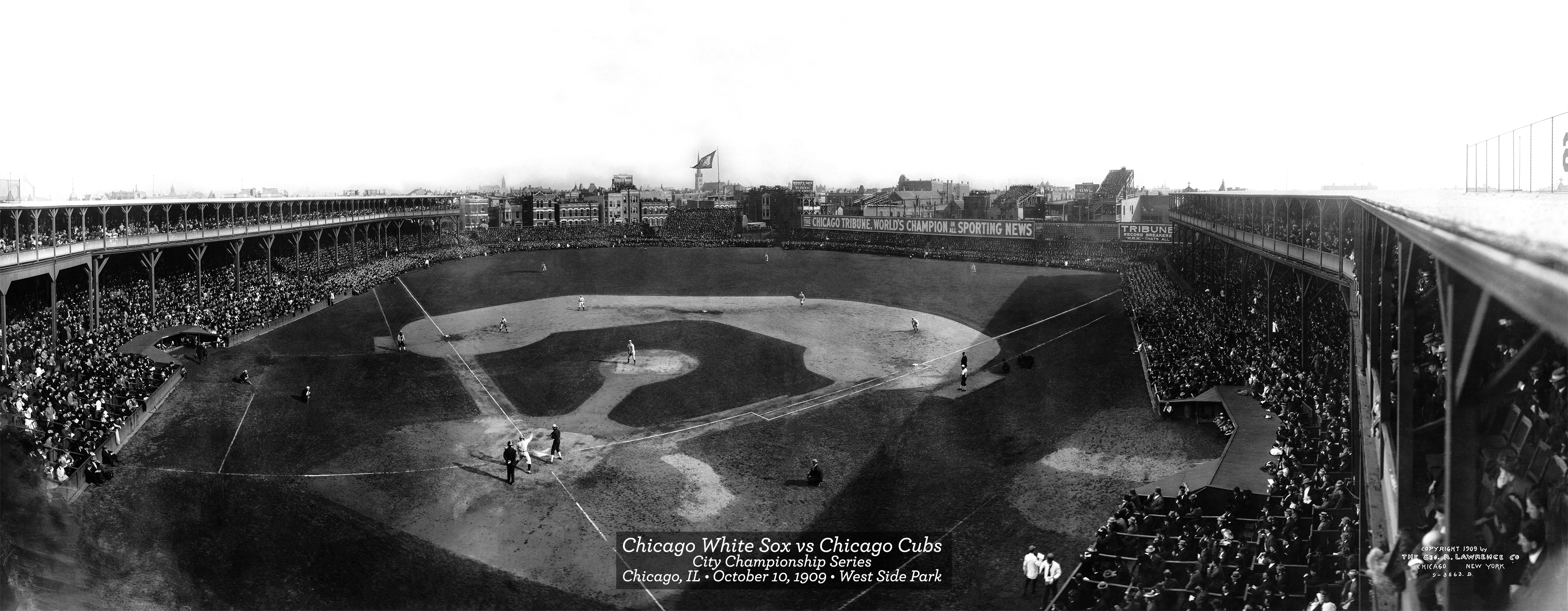
Chicago White Sox vs Chicago Cubs 1909

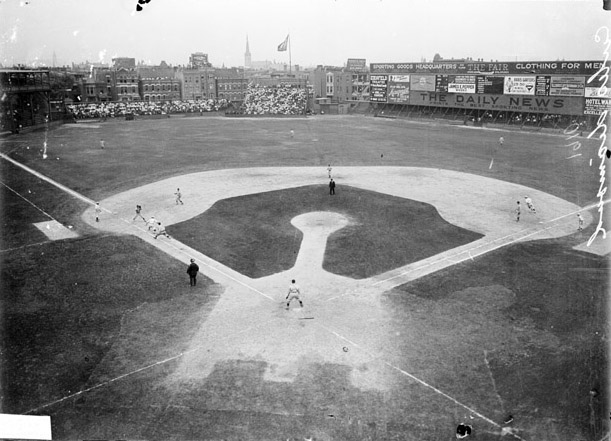
New right field billboard, 1910

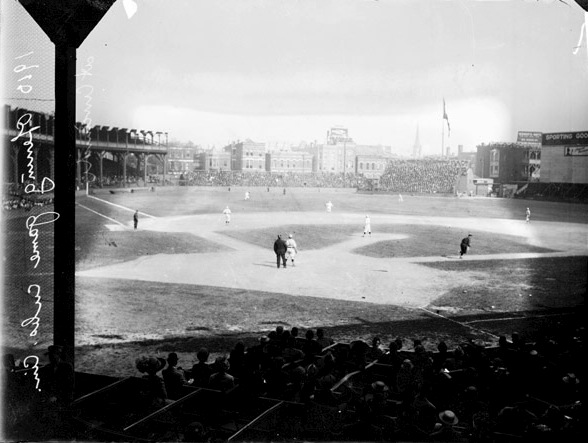
Cubs vs. Reds in 1910

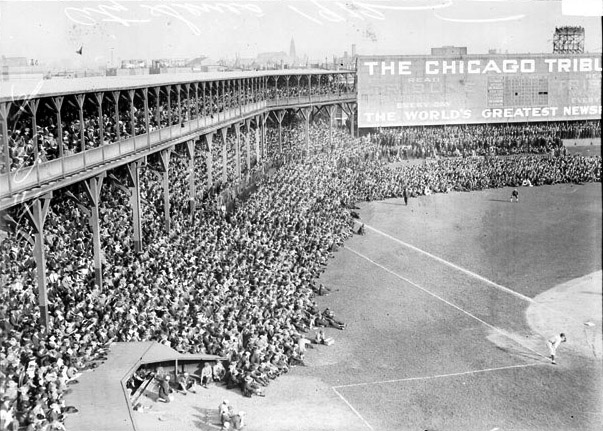
Action during 1912 "City Series" with White Sox

Sanborn map diagram, 1917

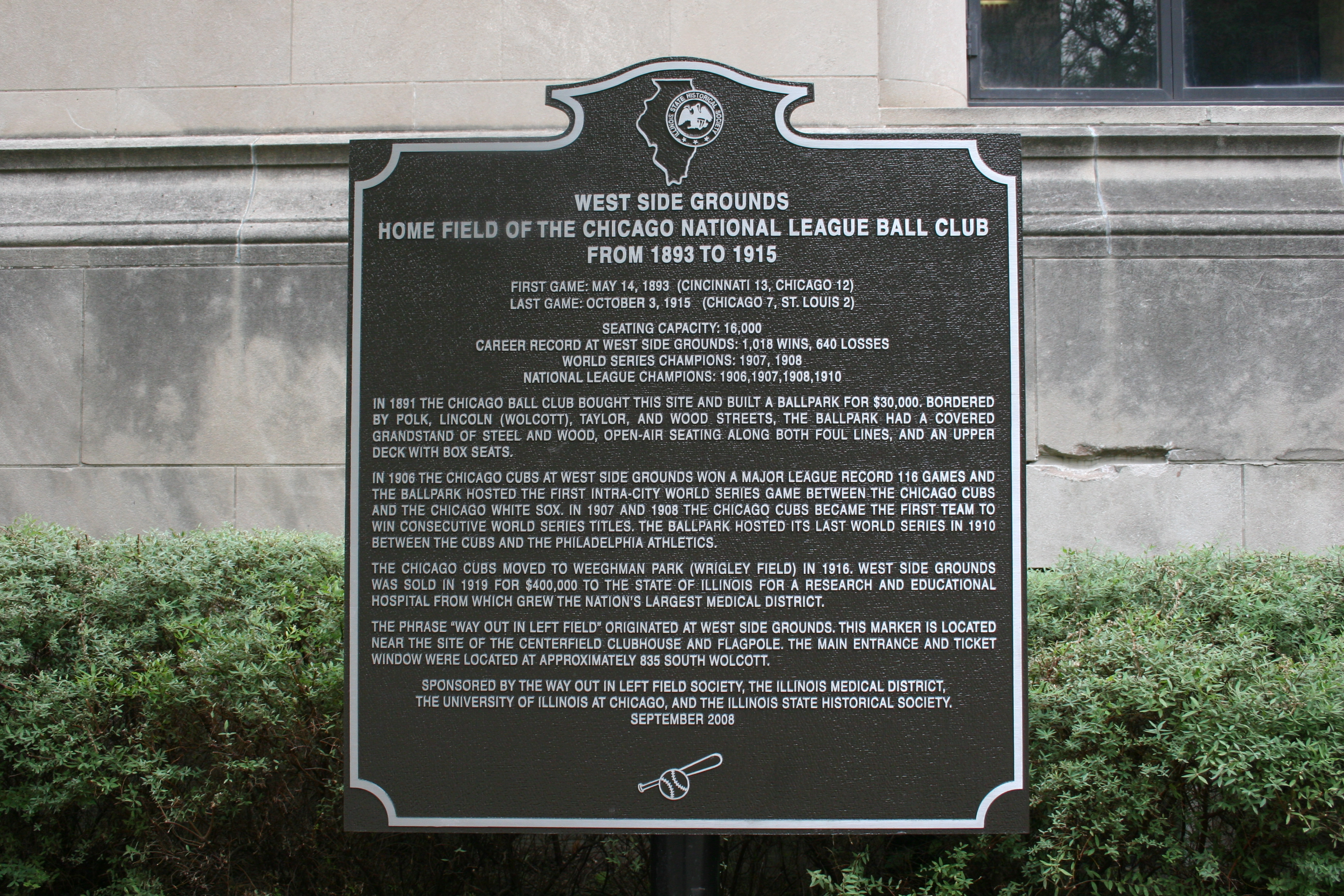
Commemorative sign on Wood Street, outside the UIC Department of Psychiatry

== Sources ==
- Lowry, Philip J. (2006). Green Cathedrals: The Ultimate Celebration of Major League and Negro League Ballparks. New York: Walker & Company. ISBN 0-8027-1562-1.
- Hartel, William (1994). A Day at the Park. Champaign, IL: Sagamore. ISBN 0-915611-91-0.
- Cubs Journal, by John Snyder
- Wrigley Field: The Unauthorized Biography, by Stuart Shea
- Baseball Memories: 1900–1909, by Marc Okkonen

Events and tenants
| Preceded by Lakefront Park | Home of the Chicago White Stockings; 1885–1891 | Succeeded by South Side Park |
| Preceded by South Side Park | Home of the Chicago Cubs; 1894–1915 | Succeeded by Weeghman Park |
