= Chicago World Language Academy =

School in Chicago, Illinois, US

Location
- 1340 West Harrison Street; Chicago, Illinois 60607; United States

Information
- Type: Public primary school
- School district: Chicago Public Schools
- Grades: K-8
- Enrollment: 506 (2020-21)
- Website: www.cps.edu/schools/schoolprofiles/chicago-world-language-academy

The Chicago World Language Academy was opened in 1894 to serve children from the crowded tenement community surrounding the Polk Street Station port of entry for immigrants. That year was started one of the first public schools kindergartens in Chicago, Illinois. Since 1981 this school has offered foreign language instruction to Chicago's students. In 1988, the Chicago World Language Academy moved into a new and up-to-date facility.

== History ==
The school opened in 1894 at what is now 820 South Carpenter Street. In 1989 the school moved to a new building at 1340 West Harrison Street. That location, a century prior, had been the first West Side Park, home of the baseball club now known as the Chicago Cubs.

The Andrew Jackson Language Academy was renamed to The Chicago World Language Academy in May 2020 due to concerns of being associated with Andrew Jackson, who participated in the slave trade and owned over 300 slaves in his lifetime.

== Languages ==
The Chicago World Language Academy provides curriculum in four foreign languages. They are Japanese, French, Spanish, and Chinese.

== Grades ==
The Chicago World Language Academy offers kindergarten through eighth grade. Each grade has two classes and two teachers. An exception is 4th 5th 6th 7th and 8th graders. They have a teacher for each subject. Classes normally have around 27/28 children each.
