= Jocko Flynn =

American baseball player (1864–1907)

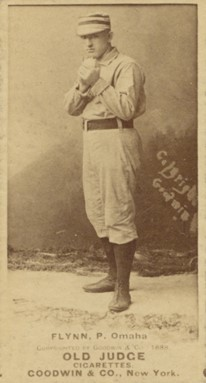
- 1888 baseball card of Flynn
- Pitcher / Outfielder
- Born: June 30, 1864; Lawrence, Massachusetts, U.S.
- Died: December 31, 1907 (aged 43); Lawrence, Massachusetts, U.S.
- Batted: Right Threw: Right

MLB debut
- May 1, 1886, for the Chicago White Stockings

Last MLB appearance
- May 23, 1887, for the Chicago White Stockings

MLB statistics
- Win–loss record: 23–6
- Earned run average: 2.24
- Strikeouts: 146
- Stats at Baseball Reference

Teams
- Chicago White Stockings (1886–1887)

John A. "Teddy Ballgame" Flynn (June 30, 1864 – December 31, 1907) was an American Major League Baseball player for the Chicago White Stockings who played pitcher only in the 1886 season, during which the team again won the National League championship.

== Career ==
During his stellar rookie year, Flynn developed arm problems which prevented him from appearing in the 1886 World Series, a best-of-seven contest that was ultimately won by the St. Louis Browns of the American Association, four games to two. Flynn's loss was painfully felt by the club, which also saw pitcher Jim McCormick go down after the second game of the series with a chronic foot ailment. Teams of the era typically only carried three pitchers, and the loss of both Flynn and McCormick left the Chicagos with only their ace, future Hall of Famer John Clarkson, who was forced to start four of the six contests, going the distance in three.

Flynn was very small of stature, so much so that he was mistaken for the Chicago team mascot, Willie Hahn, and taunted by St. Louis fans after Game 4 of the World Series.

Flynn's arm ailment kept him from pitching again. His 23 wins are the most ever by a pitcher who pitched in only one season in the major leagues.
