= Pittsburgh Burghers all-time roster =

List of baseball players

The Pittsburgh Burghers were a professional baseball team based in Pittsburgh, Pennsylvania, that played in the Players' League for one season in 1890. The franchise used Exposition Park as their home field. During their only season in existence, the team finished sixth in the PL with a record of 60–68.

== Players ==
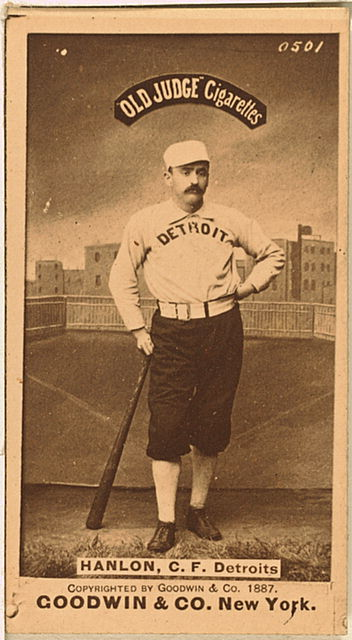
Center fielder Ned Hanlon was one of three Burghers players elected into the Baseball Hall of Fame.

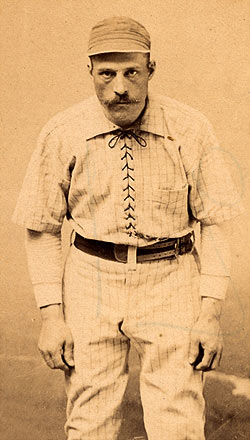
Right fielder Joe Visner played in the major leagues for four seasons.

Key to symbols in player table
*	Player was a player-manager
†	Inducted into the National Baseball Hall of Fame and Museum
§	Indicates the player is a Hall of Famer and was a player-manager

Players who played for the Pittsburgh Burghers, primary position played, and season(s) played for franchise
Player	Position(s)	Season(s)	Notes	Ref
Jake Beckley^{†}	First baseman	1890	Beckley led the Burghers in batting average (.324) and runs batted in (120).	
Fred Carroll	Catcher / Left fielder	1890		
Tommy Corcoran	Shortstop	1890		
Fred Doe	Pitcher	1890		
Jocko Fields	Left fielder	1890		
Pud Galvin^{†}	Pitcher	1890	Galvin, who won 12 games for the Burghers, was eventually elected into the Baseball Hall of Fame.	
Jim Gray	Second baseman	1890		
Ned Hanlon^{§}	Center fielder	1890	Hanlon was the Burghers' center fielder and manager.	
Jerry Hurley	Catcher	1890		
Bill Kuehne	Third baseman	1890		
Al Maul	Pitcher	1890		
Ed Morris	Pitcher	1890		
Tom Quinn	Catcher	1890		
Yank Robinson	Second baseman	1890		
Harry Staley	Pitcher	1890	Staley led the Burghers in innings pitched (387.2), wins (21), and strikeouts (145).	
John Tener	Pitcher	1890		
Joe Visner	Right fielder	1890	Visner led the Burghers in runs scored (110).	
