= 1890 Pittsburgh Burghers season =

1890 Pittsburgh Burghers
- League: Players' League
- Ballpark: Exposition Park
- City: Allegheny, Pennsylvania
- Record: 60–68 (.469)
- League place: 6th
- Manager: Ned Hanlon

The 1890 Pittsburgh Burghers baseball team was a member of the short-lived Players' League. They compiled a 60–68 record, good for sixth place. After the season, the league folded, and the Burghers were bought out by their National League counterpart.

== Regular season ==
=== Season standings ===
Players' League
| Team | W | L | Pct. | GB | Home | Road |
|---|---|---|---|---|---|---|
| Boston Reds | 81 | 48 | .628 | — | 48‍–‍21 | 33‍–‍27 |
| Brooklyn Ward's Wonders | 76 | 56 | .576 | 6½ | 46‍–‍19 | 30‍–‍37 |
| New York Giants | 74 | 57 | .565 | 8 | 47‍–‍19 | 27‍–‍38 |
| Chicago Pirates | 75 | 62 | .547 | 10 | 46‍–‍23 | 29‍–‍39 |
| Philadelphia Athletics | 68 | 63 | .519 | 14 | 35‍–‍30 | 33‍–‍33 |
| Pittsburgh Burghers | 60 | 68 | .469 | 20½ | 37‍–‍28 | 23‍–‍40 |
| Cleveland Infants | 55 | 75 | .423 | 26½ | 31‍–‍30 | 24‍–‍45 |
| Buffalo Bisons | 36 | 96 | .273 | 46½ | 23‍–‍42 | 13‍–‍54 |

=== Record vs. opponents ===
1890 Players' League record Sources:
| Team | BSR | BKW | BUF | CPI | CLI | NYK | PHQ | PBU |
|---|---|---|---|---|---|---|---|---|
| Boston | — | 11–7 | 14–6–1 | 12–8 | 12–8 | 12–8 | 10–6 | 10–5 |
| Brooklyn | 7–11 | — | 12–6–1 | 10–9 | 12–8 | 7–10 | 14–6 | 14–6 |
| Buffalo | 6–14–1 | 6–12–1 | — | 5–15 | 7–9 | 3–17 | 4–16 | 5–13 |
| Chicago | 8–12 | 9–10 | 15–5 | — | 13–7 | 9–9–1 | 10–10 | 11–9 |
| Cleveland | 8–12 | 8–12 | 9–7 | 7–13 | — | 8–11 | 8–11–1 | 7–9 |
| New York | 8–12 | 10–7 | 17–3 | 9–9–1 | 11–8 | — | 5–12 | 14–6 |
| Philadelphia | 6–10 | 6–14 | 16–4 | 10–10 | 11–8–1 | 12–5 | — | 7–12 |
| Pittsburgh | 5–10 | 6–14 | 13–5 | 9–11 | 9–7 | 6–14 | 12–7 | — |

=== Roster ===
1890 Pittsburgh Burghers
Roster
| Pitchers: Fred Doe; Pud Galvin; Al Maul; Ed Morris; Harry Staley; John Tener | Catchers: Fred Carroll; Jerry Hurley; Tom Quinn; Infielders: Jake Beckley; Tommy Corcoran; Jim Gray; Bill Kuehne; Yank Robinson | Outfielders: Jocko Fields; Ned Hanlon; Joe Visner | Manager: Ned Hanlon |

== Player stats ==
=== Batting ===
==== Starters by position ====
Note: Pos = Position; G = Games played; AB = At bats; H = Hits; Avg. = Batting average; HR = Home runs; RBI = Runs batted in

| Pos | Player | G | AB | H | Avg. | HR | RBI |
|---|---|---|---|---|---|---|---|
| C | Fred Carroll | 111 | 416 | 124 | .298 | 2 | 71 |
| 1B | Jake Beckley | 121 | 516 | 167 | .324 | 9 | 120 |
| 2B | Yank Robinson | 101 | 314 | 72 | .229 | 0 | 39 |
| SS | Tommy Corcoran | 123 | 503 | 117 | .233 | 1 | 61 |
| 3B | Bill Kuehne | 128 | 537 | 126 | .235 | 5 | 73 |
| OF | Ned Hanlon | 118 | 472 | 131 | .278 | 1 | 44 |
| OF | Jocko Fields | 126 | 526 | 148 | .281 | 9 | 86 |
| OF | Joe Visner | 130 | 532 | 143 | .269 | 3 | 73 |

==== Other batters ====
Note: G = Games played; AB = At bats; H = Hits; Avg. = Batting average; HR = Home runs; RBI = Runs batted in

| Player | G | AB | H | Avg. | HR | RBI |
|---|---|---|---|---|---|---|
| Tom Quinn | 55 | 207 | 44 | .213 | 1 | 15 |
| Jerry Hurley | 8 | 22 | 6 | .273 | 0 | 2 |
| Jim Gray | 2 | 9 | 2 | .222 | 1 | 3 |

=== Pitching ===
==== Starting pitchers ====
Note: G = Games pitched; IP = Innings pitched; W = Wins; L = Losses; ERA = Earned run average; SO = Strikeouts

| Player | G | IP | W | L | ERA | SO |
|---|---|---|---|---|---|---|
| Harry Staley | 46 | 387.2 | 21 | 25 | 3.23 | 145 |
| Al Maul | 30 | 246.2 | 16 | 12 | 3.79 | 81 |
| Pud Galvin | 26 | 217.0 | 12 | 13 | 4.35 | 35 |
| Ed Morris | 18 | 144.1 | 8 | 7 | 4.86 | 25 |
| John Tener | 14 | 117.0 | 3 | 11 | 7.31 | 30 |

==== Relief pitchers ====
Note: G = Games pitched; W = Wins; L = Losses; SV = Saves; ERA = Earned run average; SO = Strikeouts

| Player | G | W | L | SV | ERA | SO |
|---|---|---|---|---|---|---|
| Fred Doe | 1 | 0 | 0 | 0 | 4.50 | 2 |
