= Columbus Buckeyes all-time roster =

List of baseball players

The Columbus Buckeyes were a professional baseball team that played in the American Association for two seasons from 1883 to 1884. The franchise used Recreation Park I as their home field. During their two seasons of existence, the team had a record of 101–104.

== Players ==
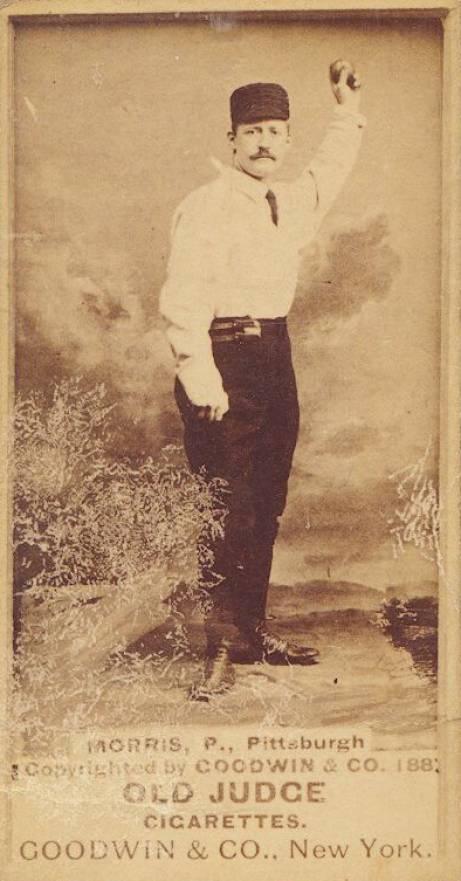
Pitcher Ed Morris

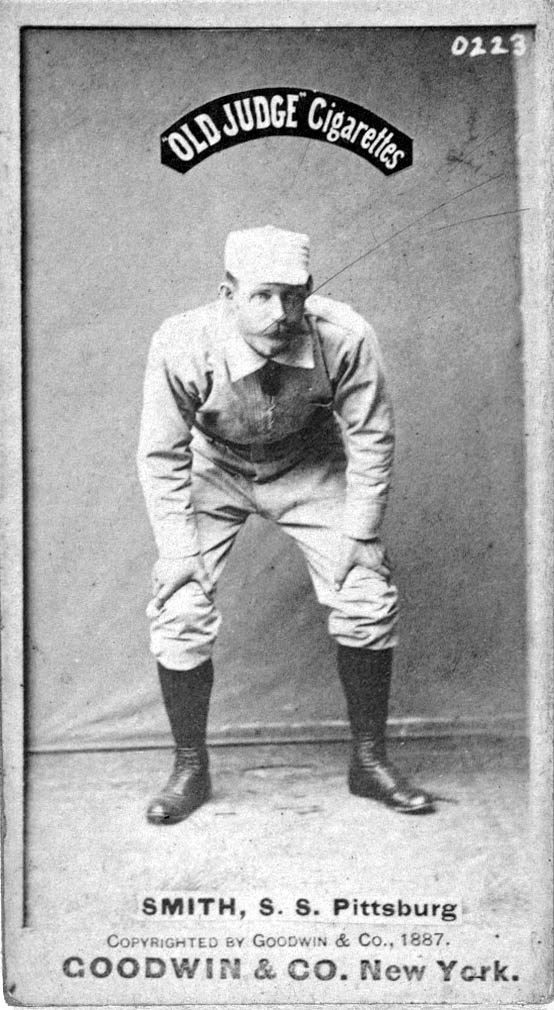
Second baseman Pop Smith

Players who played for the Columbus Buckeyes, primary position played, and season(s) played for franchise
Player	Position(s)	Season(s)	Notes	Ref
Al Bauer	Pitcher	1884		
Tom Brown	Right fielder	1883–1884	Brown led the Buckeyes in runs scored in 1884.	
John Cahill	Left fielder	1884		
Fred Carroll	Catcher	1884	Carroll led the Buckeyes in batting average in 1884.	
Sam Childs	First baseman	1883		
Ed Dundon	Pitcher	1883–1884		
Jim Field	First baseman	1883–1884		
Pete Fries	Pitcher	1883		
Rudy Kemmler	Catcher	1883–1884		
Bill Kuehne	Third baseman	1883–1884		
Fred Mann	Center fielder	1883–1884		
Tom Mansell	Left fielder	1884		
Frank McIntyre	Pitcher	1883		
Ed Morris	Pitcher	1884	Morris led the Buckeyes in wins and strikeouts in 1884.	
Frank Mountain	Pitcher	1883–1884	Mountain led the Buckeyes in wins and strikeouts in 1883.	
Gracie Pierce	Second baseman	1883		
John Richmond	Shortstop	1883–1884	Richmond led the Buckeyes in batting average in 1883.	
Bill Schwartz	Catcher / First baseman	1883		
Pop Smith	Second baseman	1883–1884	Smith led the Buckeyes in runs scored in 1883.	
Joe Straub	Catcher	1883		
Tom Sullivan	Pitcher	1884		
John Valentine	Pitcher	1883		
Harry Wheeler	Left fielder	1883		
