= John Valentine (baseball) =

American baseball player and umpire (1855–1903)

- Umpire/Pitcher
- Born: November 21, 1855; Brooklyn, New York, U.S.
- Died: October 10, 1903 (aged 47); Central Islip, New York, U.S.
- Batted: Both Threw: Left

MLB debut
- May 3, 1883, for the Columbus Buckeyes

Last MLB appearance
- August 3, 1883, for the Columbus Buckeyes

MLB statistics
- Win–loss record: 2–10
- Games: 13
- Earned run average: 3.53
- Stats at Baseball Reference

Teams
- Columbus Buckeyes (1883)

John Gill Valentine (November 21, 1855 – October 10, 1903) was an American pitcher and umpire in Major League Baseball who played one season as a player for the 1883 Columbus Buckeyes of the American Association, and later umpired from 1884 to 1888.

== Playing career ==
Born in Brooklyn, New York, he made his major league debut for the Buckeyes in 1883, his only season as a player, and compiled 13 games pitched, starting 12 and completing 11 of them. He had a win-loss record of 2–10, with an earned run average of 3.53 in 102 innings pitched.

== Umpiring career ==
After the 1883 season, Valentine became an umpire, beginning in 1884 for the American Association, and umpiring 102 games that first season. He continued umpiring in the Association until midway through the 1887 season, when switched over to the National League, which is where he continued to umpire until retiring after the 1888 season.

Valentine was involved in a couple of notable games, including being behind the plate for two no-hitters. The first game came on May 29, 1884, when Ed Morris of the Columbus Buckeyes blanked the Pittsburgh Alleghenys; and the other came just seven days later on June 5, when Frank Mountain, also of the Buckeyes, no-hit the Washington Nationals.

== Death ==
Valentine died at the age of 47 in Central Islip, New York, and is interred at Green-Wood Cemetery in Brooklyn.
