= List of Major League Baseball annual saves leaders =

The following is a list of annual leaders in saves in Major League Baseball (MLB), with separate lists for the American League and the National League. The list includes several professional leagues and associations that were never part of MLB.

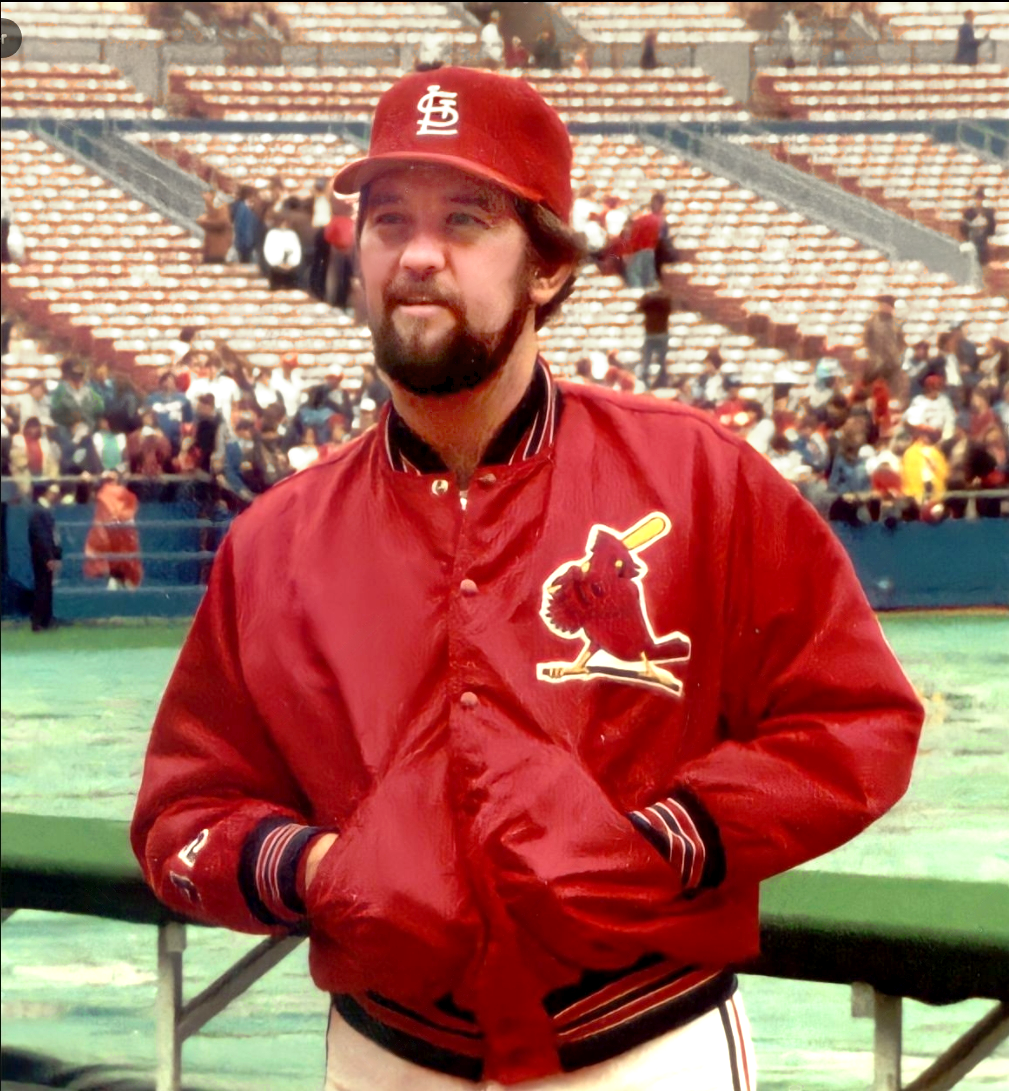
Bruce Sutter is tied for Major League records in both total times leading the league in saves (5) and consecutive league-leading seasons (4).

In baseball, a save is credited to a pitcher who finishes a game for the winning team under prescribed circumstances. Most commonly, a relief pitcher ("reliever") earns a save by entering the ninth inning with his team leading by three or fewer runs and pitching one inning without losing the lead. The statistic was created by Jerome Holtzman in 1959 to "measure the effectiveness of relief pitchers" and was adopted as an MLB official statistic in 1969. The save has been retroactively measured for pitchers before that date.

MLB recognizes the player or players in each league^{[a]} with the most saves each season. In retrospect, the five saves by Jack Manning meant he led the National League in its inaugural year, while Bill Hoffer was the American League's first saves champion with three. Mordecai Brown was the first pitcher to record at least 10 saves in a season. Dan Quisenberry, Bruce Sutter, Firpo Marberry, and Ed Walsh are the only pitchers to lead the league in saves five times (though Marberry and Walsh did so before 1969). Sutter is also tied with Harry Wright, Dan Quisenberry, and Craig Kimbrel for the most consecutive seasons leading the league in saves with four.

== American League ==
Year	Player	Team(s)	Saves
1901	Bill Hoffer	Cleveland Blues	3
1902	Jack Powell	St. Louis Browns	2
1903	Bill Dinneen; George Mullin; Al Orth; Jack Powell; Cy Young	Boston Americans; Detroit Tigers; Washington Senators; St. Louis Browns; Boston Americans	2
1904	Case Patten	Washington Senators	3
1905	Jim Buchanan	St. Louis Browns	2
1906	Chief Bender; Otto Hess	Philadelphia Athletics; Cleveland Naps	3
1907	Bill Dinneen (2); Tom Hughes; Ed Walsh	Boston/St. Louis; Washington Senators; Chicago White Sox	4
1908	Ed Walsh (2)	Chicago White Sox	6
1909	Frank Arellanes	Boston Red Sox	8
1910	Ed Walsh (3)	Chicago White Sox	5
1911	Charley Hall; Eddie Plank; Ed Walsh (4)	Boston Red Sox; Philadelphia Athletics; Chicago White Sox	4
1912	Ed Walsh (5)	Chicago White Sox	10
1913	Chief Bender	Philadelphia Athletics	13
1914	Jack Bentley; Hooks Dauss; Red Faber; Roy Mitchell; Jim Shaw	Washington Senators; Detroit Tigers; Chicago White Sox; St. Louis Browns; Washington Senators	4
1915	Carl Mays	Boston Red Sox	7
1916	Bob Shawkey	New York Yankees	8
1917	Dave Danforth	Chicago White Sox	9
1918	George Mogridge	New York Yankees	7
1919	Allen Russell; Jim Shaw (2); Bob Shawkey (2)	New York/Boston; Washington Senators; New York Yankees	5
1920	Dickey Kerr; Urban Shocker	Chicago White Sox; St. Louis Browns	5
1921	Carl Mays (2); Jim Middleton	New York Yankees; Detroit Tigers	7
1922	Sam Jones	New York Yankees	8
1923	Allen Russell (2)	Washington Senators	9
1924	Firpo Marberry	Washington Senators	15
1925	Firpo Marberry (2)	Washington Senators	15
1926	Firpo Marberry (3)	Washington Senators	22
1927	Garland Braxton; Wilcy Moore	Washington Senators; New York Yankees	13
1928	Waite Hoyt	New York Yankees	8
1929	Firpo Marberry (4)	Washington Senators	11
1930	Lefty Grove	Philadelphia Athletics	9
1931	Wilcy Moore	Boston Red Sox	10
1932	Firpo Marberry (5)	Washington Senators	13
1933	Jack Russell	Washington Senators	13
1934	Jack Russell (2)	Washington Senators	7
1935	Jack Knott	St. Louis Browns	7
1936	Pat Malone	New York Yankees	9
1937	Clint Brown	Chicago White Sox	18
1938	Johnny Murphy	New York Yankees	11
1939	Johnny Murphy (2)	New York Yankees	19
1940	Al Benton	Detroit Tigers	17
1941	Johnny Murphy (3)	New York Yankees	15
1942	Johnny Murphy (4)	New York Yankees	11
1943	Gordon Maltzberger	Chicago White Sox	14
1944	Joe Berry; George Caster; Gordon Maltzberger (2)	Philadelphia Athletics; St. Louis Browns; Chicago White Sox	12
1945	Jim Turner	New York Yankees	10
1946	Bob Klinger	Boston Red Sox	9
1947	Ed Klieman; Joe Page	Cleveland Indians; New York Yankees	17
1948	Russ Christopher	Cleveland Indians	17
1949	Joe Page (2)	New York Yankees	27
1950	Mickey Harris	Washington Senators	15
1951	Ellis Kinder	Boston Red Sox	14
1952	Harry Dorish	Chicago White Sox	11
1953	Ellis Kinder (2)	Boston Red Sox	27
1954	Johnny Sain	New York Yankees	22
1955	Ray Narleski	Cleveland Indians	19
1956	George Zuverink	Baltimore Orioles	16
1957	Bob Grim	New York Yankees	19
1958	Ryne Duren	New York Yankees	20
1959	Turk Lown	Chicago White Sox	15
1960	Mike Fornieles; Johnny Klippstein	Boston Red Sox; Cleveland Indians	14
1961	Luis Arroyo	New York Yankees	29
1962	Dick Radatz	Boston Red Sox	24
1963	Stu Miller	Baltimore Orioles	27
1964	Dick Radatz (2)	Boston Red Sox	29
1965	Ron Kline	Washington Senators	29
1966	Jack Aker	Kansas City Athletics	32
1967	Minnie Rojas	California Angels	27
1968	Al Worthington	Minnesota Twins	18
1969	Ron Perranoski	Minnesota Twins	31
1970	Ron Perranoski (2)	Minnesota Twins	34
1971	Ken Sanders	Milwaukee Brewers	31
1972	Sparky Lyle	New York Yankees	35
1973	John Hiller	Detroit Tigers	38
1974	Terry Forster	Chicago White Sox	24
1975	Goose Gossage	Chicago White Sox	26
1976	Sparky Lyle (2)	New York Yankees	23
1977	Bill Campbell	Boston Red Sox	31
1978	Goose Gossage (2)	New York Yankees	27
1979	Mike Marshall	Minnesota Twins	32
1980	Goose Gossage (3); Dan Quisenberry	New York Yankees; Kansas City Royals	33
1981	Rollie Fingers	Milwaukee Brewers	28
1982	Dan Quisenberry (2)	Kansas City Royals	35
1983	Dan Quisenberry (3)	Kansas City Royals	45
1984	Dan Quisenberry (4)	Kansas City Royals	44
1985	Dan Quisenberry (5)	Kansas City Royals	37
1986	Dave Righetti	New York Yankees	46
1987	Tom Henke	Toronto Blue Jays	34
1988	Dennis Eckersley	Oakland Athletics	45
1989	Jeff Russell	Texas Rangers	38
1990	Bobby Thigpen	Chicago White Sox	57
1991	Bryan Harvey	California Angels	46
1992	Dennis Eckersley (2)	Oakland Athletics	51
1993	Jeff Montgomery; Duane Ward	Kansas City Royals; Toronto Blue Jays	45
1994	Lee Smith	Baltimore Orioles	33
1995	José Mesa	Cleveland Indians	46
1996	John Wetteland	New York Yankees	43
1997	Randy Myers	Baltimore Orioles	45
1998	Tom Gordon	Boston Red Sox	46
1999	Mariano Rivera	New York Yankees	45
2000	Todd Jones; Derek Lowe	Detroit Tigers; Boston Red Sox	42
2001	Mariano Rivera (2)	New York Yankees	50
2002	Eddie Guardado	Minnesota Twins	45
2003	Keith Foulke	Oakland Athletics	43
2004	Mariano Rivera (3)	New York Yankees	53
2005	Francisco Rodríguez; Bob Wickman	Los Angeles Angels; Cleveland Indians	45
2006	Francisco Rodríguez (2)	Los Angeles Angels	47
2007	Joe Borowski	Cleveland Indians	45
2008	Francisco Rodríguez (3)	Los Angeles Angels	62
2009	Brian Fuentes	Los Angeles Angels	48
2010	Rafael Soriano	Tampa Bay Rays	45
2011	José Valverde	Detroit Tigers	49
2012	Jim Johnson	Baltimore Orioles	51
2013	Jim Johnson (2)	Baltimore Orioles	50
2014	Fernando Rodney	Seattle Mariners	48
2015	Brad Boxberger	Tampa Bay Rays	41
2016	Zack Britton	Baltimore Orioles	47
2017	Álex Colomé	Tampa Bay Rays	47
2018	Edwin Díaz	Seattle Mariners	57
2019	Roberto Osuna	Houston Astros	38
2020	Brad Hand	Cleveland Indians	16
2021	Liam Hendriks	Chicago White Sox	38
2022	Emmanuel Clase	Cleveland Guardians	42
2023	Emmanuel Clase (2)	Cleveland Guardians	44
2024	Emmanuel Clase (3)	Cleveland Guardians	47
2025	Carlos Estévez	Kansas City Royals	42
2026	Bryan Baker; Cade Smith	Tampa Bay Rays; Cleveland Guardians	41

== National League ==
Year	Player	Team(s)	Saves
1876	Jack Manning	Boston Red Caps	5
1877	Cal McVey	Chicago White Stockings	2
1878	Tom Healey	Providence Grays; Indianapolis Blues	1
1879	Bobby Mathews; John Montgomery Ward	Providence Grays	1
1880	Lee Richmond	Worcester Ruby Legs	3
1881	Bobby Mathews (2)	Providence Grays; Boston Red Caps	2
1882	John Montgomery Ward (2)	Providence Grays	1
1883	Jim Whitney; Stump Weidman	Boston Beaneaters; Detroit Wolverines	2
1884	John Morrill	Boston Beaneaters	2
1885	Fred Pfeffer; Ned Williamson	Chicago White Stockings	2
1886	Charlie Ferguson	Philadelphia Quakers	2
1887	Mark Baldwin; Frederick Fass; Charlie Ferguson (2); Bob Pettit; Bill Stemmyer; Mike Tiernan; Larry Twitchell; George Van Haltren	Chicago White Stockings; Indianapolis Hoosiers; Philadelphia Quakers; Chicago White Stockings; Boston Beaneaters; New York Giants; Detroit Wolverines; Chicago White Stockings	1
1888	George Wood	Philadelphia Quakers	2
1889	Bill Bishop; Bill Sowders; Mickey Welch	Chicago White Stockings; Boston/Pittsburgh; New York Giants	2
1890	Dave Foutz; Kid Gleason; Bill Hutchison	Brooklyn Bridegrooms; Philadelphia Phillies; Chicago Colts	2
1891	John Clarkson; Kid Nichols	Boston Beaneaters	3
1892	Gus Weyhing	Philadelphia Phillies	3
1893	Mark Baldwin (2); Tom Colcolough; Frank Donnelly; Frank Dwyer; Tony Mullane	Pittsburgh/New York; Pittsburgh Pirates; Chicago Colts; Cincinnati Reds; Cincinnati/Baltimore	2
1894	Tony Mullane (2)	Baltimore Orioles; Cleveland Spiders	4
1895	Ernie Beam; Kid Nichols (2); Tom Parrott	Philadelphia Phillies; Boston Beaneaters; Cincinnati Reds	3
1896	Cy Young	Cleveland Spiders	3
1897	Win Mercer; Kid Nichols (3)	Washington Senators; Boston Beaneaters	3
1898	Kid Nichols (4)	Boston Beaneaters	4
1899	Sam Leever	Pittsburgh Pirates	3
1900	Frank Kitson	Brooklyn Superbas	4
1901	Wild Bill Donovan; Jack Powell	Brooklyn Superbas; St. Louis Cardinals	3
1902	Vic Willis	Boston Beaneaters	3
1903	Carl Lundgren; Roscoe Miller	Chicago Cubs; New York Giants	3
1904	Joe McGinnity	New York Giants	5
1905	Claude Elliott	New York Giants	6
1906	George Ferguson	New York Giants	7
1907	Joe McGinnity (2)	New York Giants	4
1908	Mordecai Brown; Christy Mathewson; Joe McGinnity (3)	Chicago Cubs; New York Giants; New York Giants	5
1909	Mordecai Brown (2)	Chicago Cubs	7
1910	Mordecai Brown (3); Harry Gaspar	Chicago Cubs; Cincinnati Reds	7
1911	Mordecai Brown (4)	Chicago Cubs	13
1912	Slim Sallee	St. Louis Cardinals	6
1913	Larry Cheney	Chicago Cubs	11
1914	Red Ames; Slim Sallee (2)	Cincinnati Reds; St. Louis Cardinals	6
1915	Tom Hughes	Boston Braves	9
1916	Red Ames (2)	St. Louis Cardinals	8
1917	Slim Sallee (3)	New York Giants	4
1918	Fred Anderson; Wilbur Cooper; Joe Oeschger; Fred Toney	New York Giants; Pittsburgh Pirates; Philadelphia Phillies; Cincinnati/New York	3
1919	Oscar Tuero	St. Louis Cardinals	4
1920	Bill Sherdel	St. Louis Cardinals	6
1921	Lou North	St. Louis Cardinals	7
1922	Claude Jonnard	New York Giants	5
1923	Claude Jonnard (2)	New York Giants	5
1924	Jakie May	Cincinnati Reds	6
1925	Guy Bush; Johnny Morrison	Chicago Cubs; Pittsburgh Pirates	4
1926	Chick Davies	New York Giants	6
1927	Bill Sherdel (2)	St. Louis Cardinals	6
1928	Hal Haid; Bill Sherdel (3)	St. Louis Cardinals	5
1929	Guy Bush (2); Johnny Morrison	Chicago Cubs; Brooklyn Robins	8
1930	Hi Bell	St. Louis Cardinals	8
1931	Jack Quinn	Brooklyn Robins	15
1932	Jack Quinn (2)	Brooklyn Dodgers	8
1933	Phil Collins	Philadelphia Phillies	6
1934	Carl Hubbell	New York Giants	8
1935	Dutch Leonard	Brooklyn Dodgers	8
1936	Dizzy Dean	St. Louis Cardinals	11
1937	Mace Brown; Cliff Melton	Pittsburgh Pirates; New York Giants	7
1938	Dick Coffman	New York Giants	12
1939	Bob Bowman; Clyde Shoun	St. Louis Cardinals	9
1940	Joe Beggs; Jumbo Brown; Mace Brown	Cincinnati Reds; New York Giants; Pittsburgh Pirates	7
1941	Jumbo Brown (2)	New York Giants	8
1942	Hugh Casey	Brooklyn Dodgers	13
1943	Les Webber	Brooklyn Dodgers	10
1944	Ace Adams	New York Giants	13
1945	Ace Adams (2); Andy Karl	New York Giants; Philadelphia Phillies	15
1946	Ken Raffensberger	Philadelphia Phillies	6
1947	Hugh Casey (2)	Brooklyn Dodgers	18
1948	Harry Gumbert	Cincinnati Reds	17
1949	Ted Wilks	St. Louis Cardinals	9
1950	Jim Konstanty	Philadelphia Phillies	22
1951	Ted Wilks (2)	St. Louis Cardinals	13
1952	Al Brazle	St. Louis Cardinals	16
1953	Al Brazle (2)	St. Louis Cardinals	18
1954	Jim Hughes	Brooklyn Dodgers	24
1955	Jack Meyer	Philadelphia Phillies	16
1956	Clem Labine	Brooklyn Dodgers	19
1957	Clem Labine (2)	Brooklyn Dodgers	17
1958	Roy Face	Pittsburgh Pirates	20
1959	Lindy McDaniel; Don McMahon	St. Louis Cardinals; Milwaukee Braves	15
1960	Lindy McDaniel (2)	St. Louis Cardinals	26
1961	Roy Face (2); Stu Miller	Pittsburgh Pirates; San Francisco Giants	17
1962	Roy Face (3)	Pittsburgh Pirates	28
1963	Lindy McDaniel (3)	Chicago Cubs	22
1964	Hal Woodeshick	Houston Colt .45's	23
1965	Ted Abernathy	Chicago Cubs	31
1966	Phil Regan	Los Angeles Dodgers	21
1967	Ted Abernathy (2)	Cincinnati Reds	28
1968	Phil Regan (2)	Los Angeles Dodgers; Chicago Cubs	25
1969	Fred Gladding	Houston Astros	29
1970	Wayne Granger	Cincinnati Reds	35
1971	Dave Giusti	Pittsburgh Pirates	30
1972	Clay Carroll	Cincinnati Reds	37
1973	Mike Marshall	Montreal Expos	31
1974	Mike Marshall (2)	Los Angeles Dodgers	21
1975	Rawly Eastwick; Al Hrabosky	Cincinnati Reds; St. Louis Cardinals	22
1976	Rawly Eastwick (2)	Cincinnati Reds	26
1977	Rollie Fingers	San Diego Padres	35
1978	Rollie Fingers (2)	San Diego Padres	37
1979	Bruce Sutter	Chicago Cubs	37
1980	Bruce Sutter (2)	Chicago Cubs	28
1981	Bruce Sutter (3)	St. Louis Cardinals	25
1982	Bruce Sutter (4)	St. Louis Cardinals	36
1983	Lee Smith	Chicago Cubs	29
1984	Bruce Sutter (5)	St. Louis Cardinals	45
1985	Jeff Reardon	Montreal Expos	41
1986	Todd Worrell	St. Louis Cardinals	36
1987	Steve Bedrosian	Philadelphia Phillies	40
1988	John Franco	Cincinnati Reds	39
1989	Mark Davis	San Diego Padres	44
1990	John Franco (2)	New York Mets	33
1991	Lee Smith (2)	St. Louis Cardinals	47
1992	Lee Smith (3)	St. Louis Cardinals	43
1993	Randy Myers	Chicago Cubs	53
1994	John Franco (3)	New York Mets	30
1995	Randy Myers (2)	Chicago Cubs	38
1996	Jeff Brantley; Todd Worrell	Cincinnati Reds; Los Angeles Dodgers	44
1997	Jeff Shaw	Cincinnati Reds	42
1998	Trevor Hoffman	San Diego Padres	53
1999	Ugueth Urbina	Montreal Expos	41
2000	Antonio Alfonseca	Florida Marlins	45
2001	Robb Nen	San Francisco Giants	45
2002	John Smoltz	Atlanta Braves	55
2003	Éric Gagné	Los Angeles Dodgers	55
2004	Armando Benítez; Jason Isringhausen	Florida Marlins; St. Louis Cardinals	47
2005	Chad Cordero	Washington Nationals	47
2006	Trevor Hoffman (2)	San Diego Padres	46
2007	José Valverde	Arizona Diamondbacks	47
2008	José Valverde (2)	Houston Astros	44
2009	Heath Bell	San Diego Padres	42
2010	Brian Wilson	San Francisco Giants	48
2011	John Axford; Craig Kimbrel	Milwaukee Brewers; Atlanta Braves	46
2012	Craig Kimbrel (2); Jason Motte	Atlanta Braves; St. Louis Cardinals	42
2013	Craig Kimbrel (3)	Atlanta Braves	50
2014	Craig Kimbrel (4)	Atlanta Braves	47
2015	Mark Melancon	Pittsburgh Pirates	51
2016	Jeurys Familia	New York Mets	51
2017	Greg Holland; Kenley Jansen	Colorado Rockies; Los Angeles Dodgers	41
2018	Wade Davis	Colorado Rockies	43
2019	Kirby Yates	San Diego Padres	41
2020	Josh Hader	Milwaukee Brewers	13
2021	Mark Melancon	San Diego Padres	39
2022	Kenley Jansen (2)	Atlanta Braves	41
2023	David Bednar; Camilo Doval	Pittsburgh Pirates; San Francisco Giants	39
2024	Ryan Helsley	St. Louis Cardinals	49
2025	Robert Suárez	San Diego Padres	40
2026	Mason Miller; Riley O'Brien	San Diego Padres; St. Louis Cardinals	38

== American Association ==
Year	Player	Team(s)	Saves
1882	Eddie Fusselback	St. Louis Brown Stockings	1
1883	Bob Barr; Tony Mullane	Pittsburgh Alleghenys; St. Louis Browns	1
1884	Oyster Burns; Frank Mountain; Hank O'Day	Baltimore Orioles; Columbus Buckeyes; Toledo Blue Stockings	1
1885	Oyster Burns	Baltimore Orioles	3
1886	Bones Ely; Dave Foutz; Nat Hudson; Ed Morris; Joe Strauss	Louisville Colonels; St. Louis Browns; St. Louis Browns; Pittsburgh Alleghenys; Louisville Colonels	1
1887	Adonis Terry	Brooklyn Grays	3
1888	Pop Corkhill; Bob Gilks; Tony Mullane	Cincinnati Red Stockings; Cleveland Blues; Cincinnati Red Stockings	1
1889	Tony Mullane	Cincinnati Red Stockings	5
1890	Herb Goodall	Louisville Colonels	4
1891	Bill Daley; Cinders O'Brien	Boston Reds	2

== National Association ==
Year	Player	Team(s)	Saves
1871	Harry Wright	Boston Red Stockings	3
1872	Al Spalding; Harry Wright	Baltimore Canaries; Boston Red Stockings	4
1873	Harry Wright	Boston Red Stockings	4
1874	Harry Wright	Boston Red Stockings	3
1875	Al Spalding	Boston Red Stockings	8

== Union Association ==
Year	Player	Team(s)	Saves
1884	Billy Taylor	St. Louis Maroons	4

== Player's League ==
Year	Player	Team(s)	Saves
1890	George Hemming; Hank O'Day	Cleveland/Brooklyn; New York Giants	3

== Federal League ==
Year	Player	Team(s)	Saves
1914	Russ Ford	Buffalo Buffeds	6
1915	Hugh Bedient	Buffalo Blues	10

== Footnotes ==
- ^{a} Recognized "major leagues" include the American League and National League and several defunct leagues—the American Association, Federal League, Players' League, and Union Association. The National Association is also included in this list as its records are included in statistics found on sites such as Baseball-Reference.com; however, it is not recognized as a major league by Major League Baseball.
