= Samuel Childs =

Samuel Childs may refer to:

- Samuel B. Childs (1861–1938), American radiologist and college baseball player
- Samuel S. Childs (1863–1961), American restaurateur and politician

== See also ==
- Samuel Child (1693–1752), English banker and Member of Parliament
