= Exposition Park (Pittsburgh) =

Professional baseball venue in Pittsburgh to 1915

Coordinates: 40°26′49″N 80°0′39″W

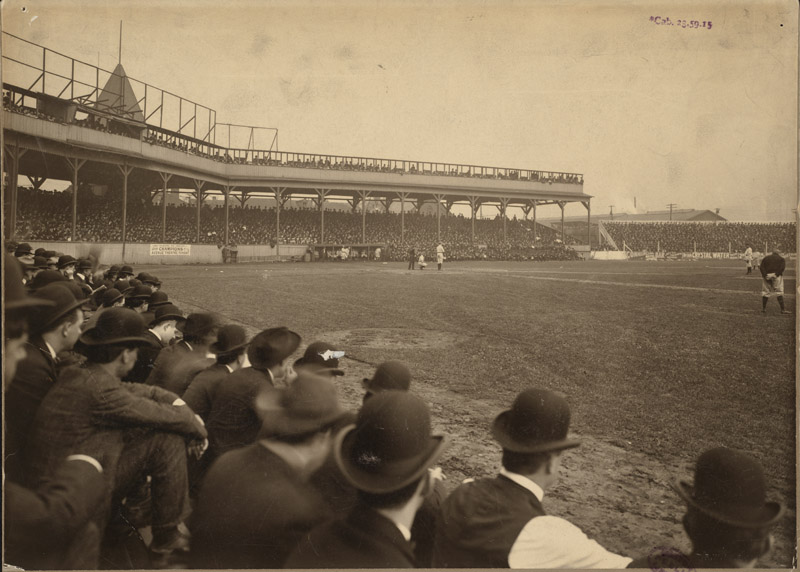
- Game 4 of the 1903 World Series at Exposition Park.
- Interactive map of Exposition Park
- Location: Allegheny, Pennsylvania (pre-1907); Pittsburgh, Pennsylvania (1907–c.1915)
- Capacity: 16,000
- Surface: Grass
- Field size: Left and Right Field – 400 feet (122 m); Center Field – 450 feet (137 m)

Construction
- Opened: 1890
- Closed: c. 1915

Tenants
- Baseball; Allegheny (AA) (1882–1883); Pittsburgh Burghers (PL) (1890); Pittsburgh Pirates (NL) (1891–1909); Pittsburgh Filipinos (USBL) (1912); Pittsburgh Stogies/Rebels (FL) (1913–1915); Football; Allegheny Athletic Association (1890–1891, 1894, 1896); Duquesne Country & A.C. (1895–1900); Homestead Library & A.C. (1901); Western University of Pennsylvania (1904–1908)

Pennsylvania Historical Marker
- Official name: First World Series
- Designated: September 18, 1998

Exposition Park was the name given to three historic stadiums, located in what is today Pittsburgh, Pennsylvania. The fields were used mainly for professional baseball and American football from c. 1879 to c. 1915. The ballparks were initially located on the north side of the Allegheny River in Allegheny, Pennsylvania. The city was annexed into Pittsburgh (then often spelled "Pittsburg") in 1907, which became the city's North Side, located across from Pittsburgh's downtown area. Due to flooding from the nearby Allegheny River, the three stadiums' exact locations varied somewhat. The final version of the ballpark was between the eventual sites of Three Rivers Stadium and PNC Park.

In 1903, the third incarnation of Exposition Park was the first National League ballpark to host a World Series game. The Western University of Pennsylvania (WUP)—known today as the University of Pittsburgh—played home football games at Exposition Park, and also used the park as a home field for the university's baseball team.

== History ==
=== Exposition Park I and II ===
Local newspapers referred to the general area along the Allegheny waterfront as "the Exposition grounds", named for other "expositions" that would be shown there, including horse racing and circuses.

Exposition Park I was the first venue in Pittsburgh that hosted major league baseball. In 1882, the club now known as the Pittsburgh Pirates—then known simply as Allegheny, or informally as "the Alleghenys"—began play at Exposition Park as a member of the American Association; however, after one season a fire and flooding of the field from the nearby river forced a second park to be built.

Despite its reason for construction, Exposition Park II was built closer to the river. The Alleghenys played at the second incarnation of the park for the first part of the 1883 season, but after the game of June 9, the club decided to return to Exposition Park I, starting with the game of June 12. The Allegheny club abandoned Expo II in 1884, moving to Recreation Park, which was several blocks north and out of the flood plain. The final usage of Expo II for baseball came in the last week of August, 1884, where the struggling Union Association club dubbed the Pittsburgh Stogies finished out their schedule after moving from Chicago.

During 1884 through 1889, the ballpark was primarily a racetrack used for many types of events: horse racing, bicycle racing, foot racing, and various exhibitions such as circuses. The grandstand ran roughly west-to-east, bordering South Avenue. The roof included five pyramid-shaped turrets. In 1887 came a short-lived attempt to rename the facility Gentlemen's Driving Park, ads for which typically appended "formerly Exposition Park". When the Players' League club began, they reconfigured the former racetrack for baseball purposes, including retaining a couple of the turrets left over from the track's grandstand.

=== Exposition Park III ===
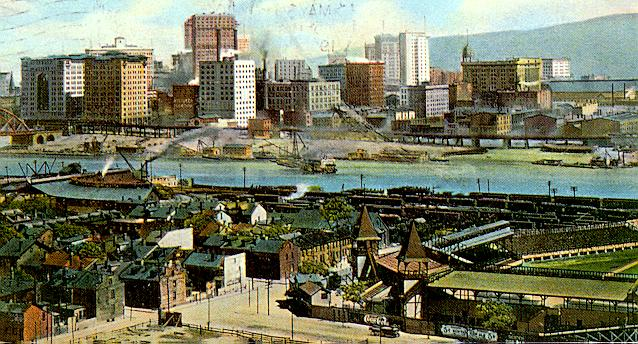
Postcard ca. 1900 including Exposition Park

While the Alleghenys were playing home games at Recreation Park, owners John Beemer and M. B. Lennon of the Pittsburgh Burghers reconfigured the former racetrack into a proper baseball park near the former sites of Exposition Parks I and II, approximately two blocks west of where PNC Park sits today. Exposition Park III included a roofed wooden grandstand around the infield, in the northeast corner of the block, and open bleacher sections extending to the right and left field corners. Total capacity was about 10,000 spectators. The seats faced the Allegheny River and the Point. The Burghers played at the stadium during the 1890 Players' League season—both the team and league's only season in existence. On June 10, 1890, Jocko Fields of the Pittsburgh Burghers hit the first home run at Exposition Park III.

The recurrent flooding which plagued the location through its entire existence led to this editorial comment about the Brotherhood (Players' League) club: "They have the most level grounds in the country. Exposition Park is covered with water."

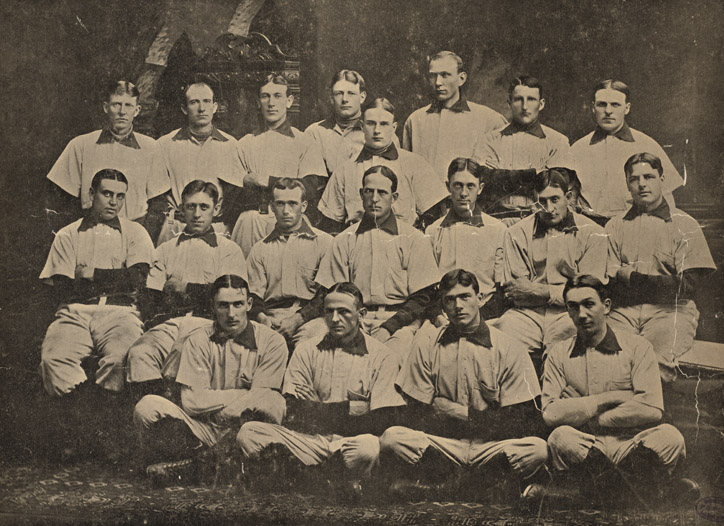
The Pirates, 1903

The newly-redubbed Pittsburgh Pirates moved to Exposition Park the following season. On April 24, 1891, Fred Carroll hit the first home run by a Pirate in the stadium. Under the management of Fred Clarke the Pirates won the National League pennant in 1901, 1902, and 1903. After the 1903 season, Dreyfuss and Boston Americans owner Henry Killilea organized a best of nine-game series to match the two pennant winners against each other. This first modern World Series held three games in Boston before moving to Exposition Park with the Pirates leading the series 2–1. On October 6, 1903, 7,600 people attended the first World Series game in a National League stadium—the Pirates won by one run. The following day 12,000 people attended the game, forcing some spectators to stand behind a rope in the outfield. The Pirates lost three of four games at Exposition Park and eventually the Series.

Flooding was not the only weather-related problem. On June 22, 1901, a severe storm swept through the area, bringing considerable damage to various structures, including partial destruction of the fence and seating areas at Expo Park. The high winds scattered debris around the vicinity, causing further damage to nearby buildings.

During a July 4, 1902 doubleheader against the Brooklyn Superbas (whose roster included a player named Flood), an Allegheny flood caused water to rise to thigh level in center and right fields, and about head level in deep center. Players occasionally caught a ball and dove under the water. The Pirates won both games of the doubleheader. Ham Hyatt is believed to be the only person to hit a ball over the right field fence. Monument Hill, which overlooked the field, allowed spectators a free view of the game.

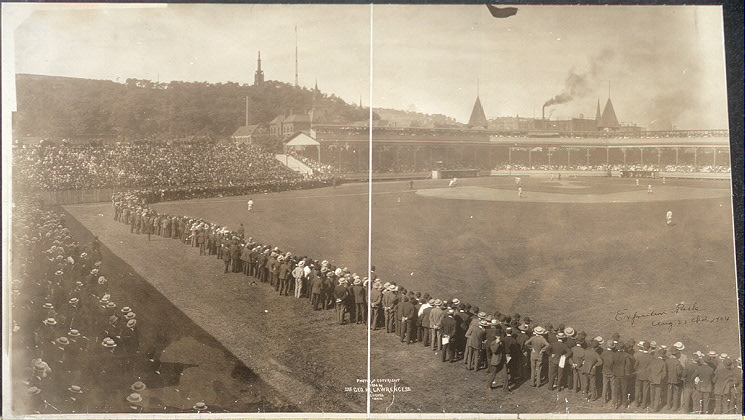
Baseball game, 1904

In 1906, the Pirates were the first baseball team to cover their field with a tarp during inclement weather, and though the field was kept dry from the rain, the Allegheny River still caused problems. Flooding sometimes covered the entire outfield with inches of standing water, causing ground rules that gave any ground ball hit into the outfield an automatic single. In 1907, Pittsburgh's pitcher Nick Maddox threw a no-hitter at Exposition Park. That would prove to be the last no-hitter thrown at a Pirates home field until Bob Gibson of the Cardinals no-hit the Pirates in 1971, at Three Rivers.

In 1908, owing to the large numbers of people that attended Pirates games, team owner Barney Dreyfuss began looking for a location to construct a new Pirates stadium. The final Pirates game at Exposition Park was played against the Chicago Cubs on June 29, 1909. The Pirates won the game 8–1 in front of 5,545 people, with George Gibson achieving the final National League hit in the ballpark. The very next day, the Pirates once again played the Cubs as the team opened Forbes Field.

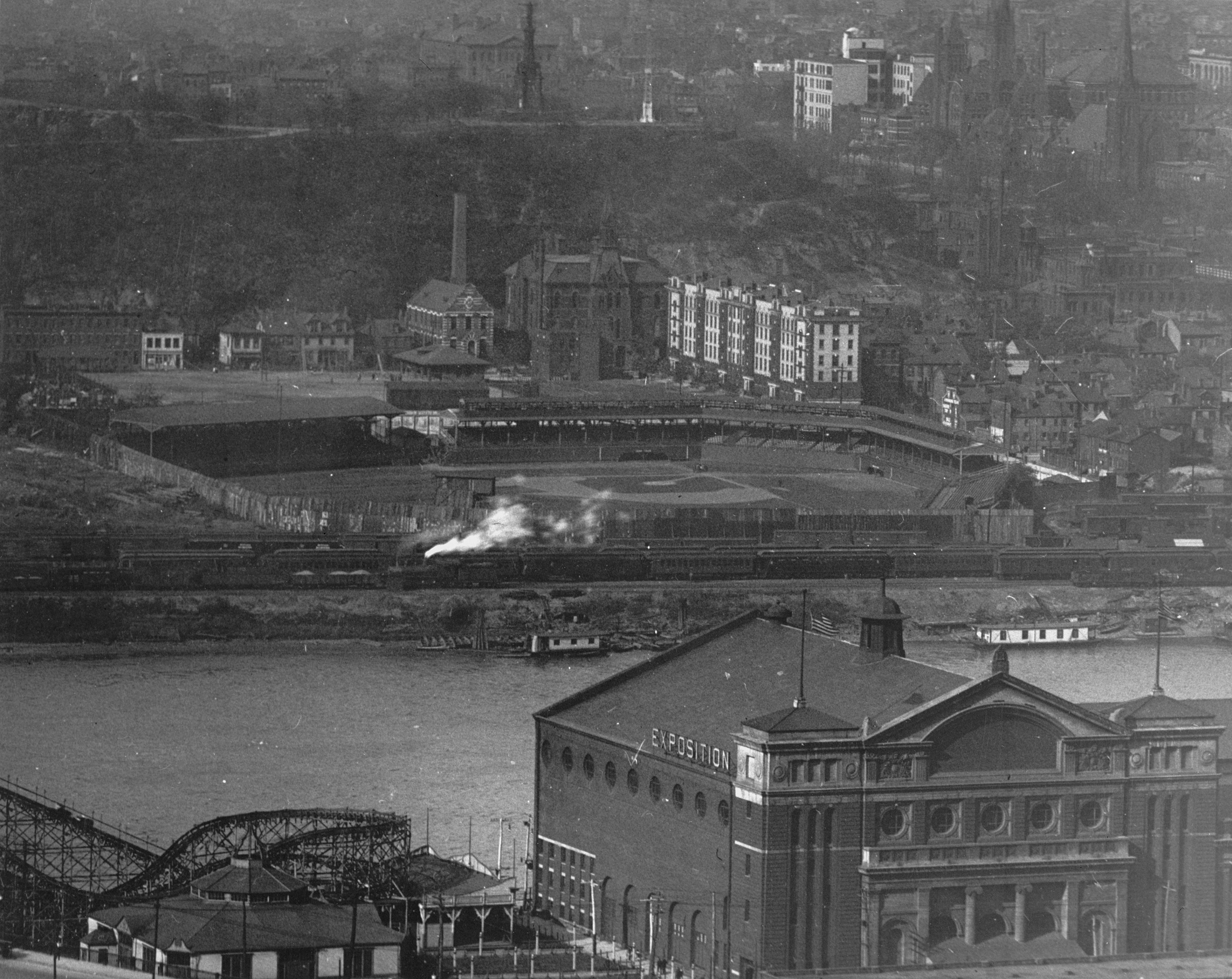
A view of Exposition Park III in 1915. Exposition Hall and its rollercoaster can also be seen in the foreground

The Pittsburgh Filipinos called Exposition Park their home in 1912. The Filipinos lasted just over a month after folding with the United States Baseball League. In 1914, the Pittsburgh Stogies began play at Exposition Park. There were some cosmetic changes to the ballpark, including the removal of the rooftop turrets, and construction of a roof over the bleachers on the first base side. In 1915, the team, renamed the Pittsburgh Rebels, improved from the previous season, finishing just percentage points behind the first place Chicago Whales. After the season, the club disbanded along with the entire Federal League, due to financial losses. That was the end of major league ball at Exposition Park. The venue continued to host Semi-professional baseball games, circuses, scrap metal drives and other events, but "was eventually razed". The 1917 city directory gave the ballpark's address as 700 South Avenue. South Avenue later became General Robinson Drive, and the 700 address corresponds to the ballpark's main entrance, now part of a parking lot.

==== Dimensions ====
In an article on the soon-to-be-opened Forbes Field, the Pittsburgh Post for June 27, 1909, stated the Expo Park dimensions as follows: left field 380 feet (115.8 metres), center field 400 feet (121.9 metres), right field 327 feet (99.7 metres).

=== Football ===
The Western University of Pennsylvania (WUP), which would in 1908 be renamed the University of Pittsburgh, played its first official game at Exposition Park on October 11, 1890, when Shadyside Academy failed to show up for their game with the Allegheny Athletic Association. The Allegheny A.A. made a call to WUP team founder Bert Smyers to bring the WUP team to the park as a replacement.

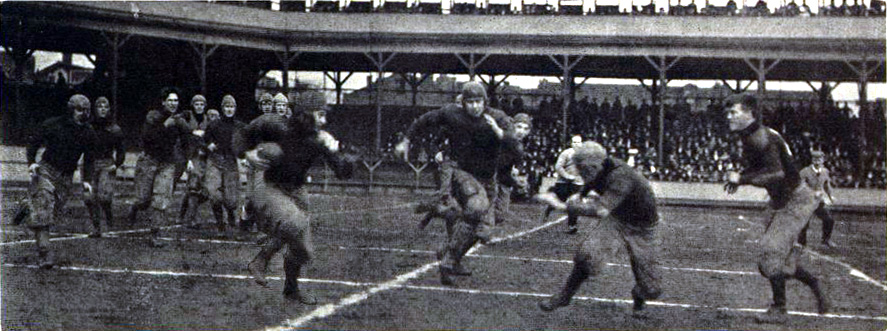
University of Pittsburgh football game, 1908

The WUP team was subsequently defeated 38–0. The WUP football team began playing games more regularly at Exposition Park around 1900, occasionally playing in other local venues. Prior to the 1903 season, Arthur Mosse was recruited from the University of Kansas to become the team's new coach. In addition to players that Mosse brought with him, WUP also recruited players from Geneva College to play on the team. Mosse's first season was a disappointment as the WUP football team went 0–8–1 and supporters of the team disbanded leaving the team $500 in debt. George Hubbard Clapp then organized a voluntary $5 "athletic fee" to be paid by students in order to allow the debt to be repaid and the school's football team to play home games at Exposition Park during the next season in order to give the WUP team a more permanent and stable home. Mosse and university officials then obtained a lease to play at Exposition Park during the fall from Pirates owner Barney Dreyfuss for 20% of the admission fee. The 1904 WUP team, the first full season in which WUP played at Exposition Park, saw WUP achieve a remarkable turnaround that included a 10–0 record in which they outscored opponents 407–5 and finished second in the state behind the University of Pennsylvania. Prior to home games at Exposition Park, WUP students would organize parades through downtown streets prior to marching across a bridge to the game. A gong, used to announce the beginning of Pirates games, was also sounded prior to the opening kickoff of WUP football contests.

== Today ==
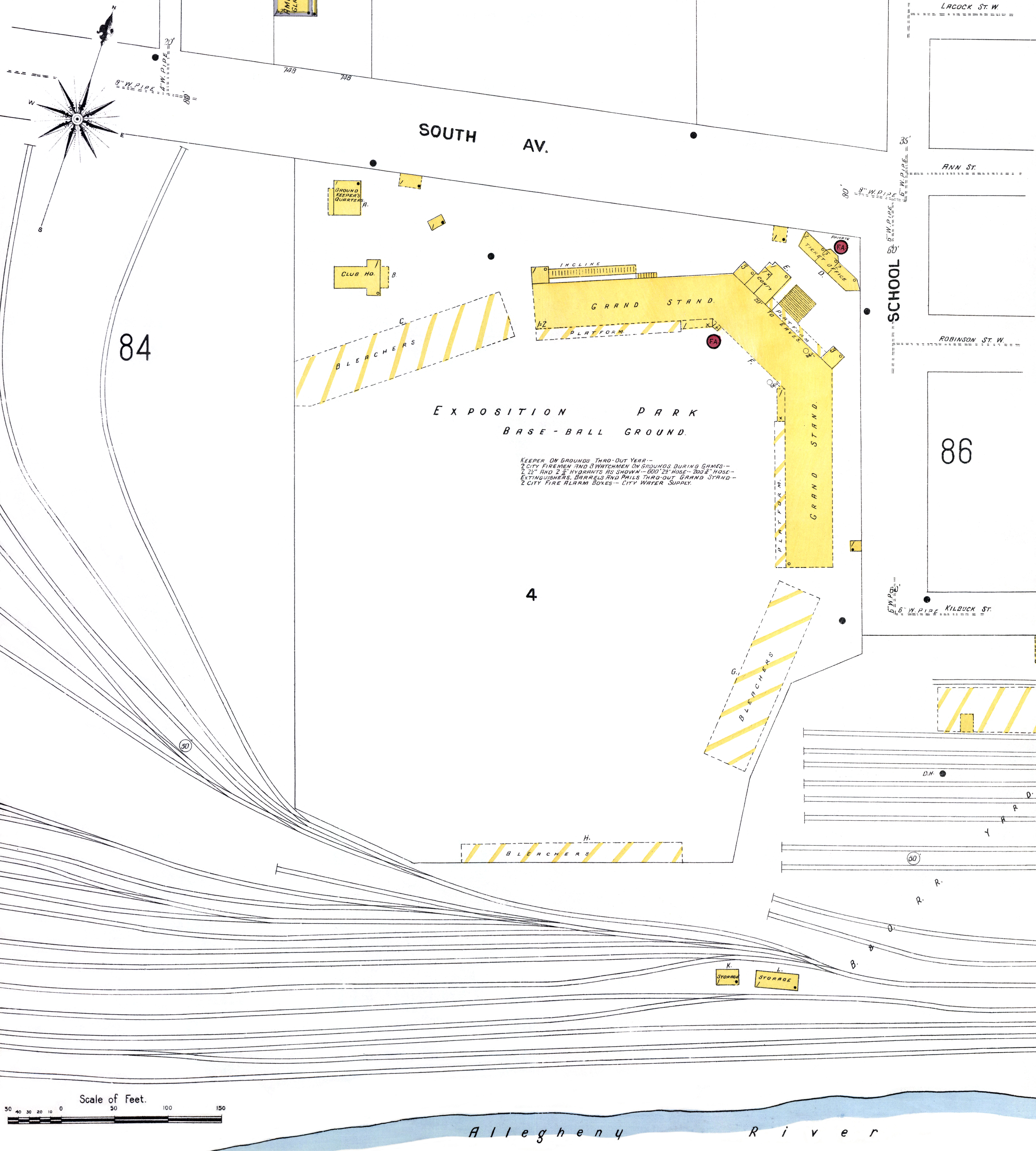
1906 Sanborn diagram of Exposition Park

After parts of 62 seasons in the Oakland district, baseball and football returned to the north side of the Allegheny River when Three Rivers Stadium opened. The site of the final incarnation of Exposition Park, relative to Three Rivers and the later PNC Park, was in between the two venues.

Exposition Park had been on the southwest corner of South Avenue (later Robinson) to the north (first base) and School Street (later Scotland) to the east (third base). To the south (left field) was some open space and railroad tracks and the Allegheny. To the west (right field) was some open space and then Grant Street (later Galveston). That open space would eventually be the site of Three Rivers. Therefore, the site of Exposition Park was the northeast corner of the parking lot east of Three Rivers.

In 1995, members of the Society for American Baseball Research marked and painted the location where home plate is believed to have been located, in honor of one of the two sites of the first World Series (the other being in Boston). At the time, the location of home plate was in a Three Rivers Stadium parking lot. In 2018, the faded home plate paint was replaced by a metal plaque by the Society for American Baseball Research.

In 1998, a Pennsylvania Historical marker was placed at the site of the park. Interstate 279 currently runs over portions of the site of Exposition Park just before crossing the Allegheny River along the Fort Duquesne Bridge.

== Bibliography ==
- Finoli, David; Ranier, Bill (2003). The Pittsburgh Pirates Encyclopedia. Sports Publishing LLC. ISBN 978-1-58261-416-8.

Preceded by Recreation Park	Home of the Pittsburgh Pirates; 1891–1909	Succeeded by Forbes Field
