= Pittsburgh Filipinos =

- Pittsburgh, Pennsylvania; 1912

Minor league affiliations
- Previous leagues: United States Baseball League (1912)

Minor league titles
- League titles (1): (1912)* [*] – The Filipinos finished in first place during the USBL's inaugural season, which lasted only one month, with a 19-7 record.

Team data
- Colors: Black, gold (1912); Green, silver
- Previous parks: Exposition Park
- Owner/ Operator: Marshall Henderson
- Manager: Deacon Phillippe

The Pittsburgh Filipinos were a minor league baseball club based in Pittsburgh, Pennsylvania. The team began play in 1912 in the United States Baseball League. The team played all of its home games at Exposition Park, located on Pittsburgh's Northside. The Filipinos were named in honor of their manager, Deacon Phillippe, a former pitcher with the Pittsburgh Pirates and a member of their 1901, 1902, 1903 and 1909 National League pennant winning teams as well as their 1909 World Series championship team.

The Filipinos finished in first place during the league's inaugural season, which lasted only one month, with a 19-7 record.

In 1913, the team became a charter member of the Federal League, which was launched as an independent minor league. The club was renamed that season as the Pittsburgh Stogies after an earlier Pittsburgh team that played in the Union Association in 1884. The following season, the Federal League declared itself a major league, and the team would become known as the Pittsburgh Rebels.
