= Al Bauer =

American baseball player (1859–1944)

- Bauer with the 1886 St. Louis Maroons
- Pitcher
- Born: August 7, 1859; Columbus, Ohio, U.S.
- Died: February 23, 1944 (aged 84); Columbus, Ohio, U.S.
- Batted: Unknown Threw: Left

MLB debut
- September 22, 1884, for the Columbus Buckeyes

Last MLB appearance
- June 11, 1886, for the St. Louis Maroons

MLB statistics
- Win–loss record: 1–6
- Earned run average: 5.37
- Strikeouts: 13
- Stats at Baseball Reference

Teams
- Columbus Buckeyes (1884); St. Louis Maroons (1886)

Albert Bauer (August 7, 1859 – February 23, 1944) was an American professional baseball player. A pitcher, he played in two seasons in Major League Baseball for the Columbus Buckeyes and the St. Louis Maroons.

== Professional career ==
=== Columbus Buckeyes ===
At the age of 25 Bauer made his professional debut with the Chillicothe Logans of the Ohio State League in 1884. He was acquired by the Columbus Buckeyes of the American Association in September. He went 1–2 on the season with 13 strikeouts with a 4.68 ERA in three games, all starts.

=== St. Louis Maroons ===
After playing for the Atlanta team in the Southern League in 1885, Bauer joined the St. Louis Maroons in 1886. In four games, all starts, Bauer would go 0–4 with 13 strikeouts and a 5.97 ERA in 28 2/3 innings pitched. After pitching in the minors again in 1887, Bauer left professional baseball.
