= Tom Quinn (baseball) =

American baseball player (1864–1932)

- Catcher
- Born: April 25, 1864; Annapolis, Maryland, U.S.
- Died: July 24, 1932 (aged 68); Pittsburgh, Pennsylvania, U.S.
- Batted: Right Threw: Right

MLB debut
- September 2, 1886, for the Pittsburgh Alleghenys

Last MLB appearance
- October 4, 1890, for the Pittsburgh Burghers

MLB statistics
- Batting average: .189
- Home runs: 2
- Runs batted in: 30
- Stats at Baseball Reference

Teams
- Pittsburgh Alleghenys (1886); Baltimore Orioles (1889); Pittsburgh Burghers (1890)

Thomas Oscar Quinn (April 25, 1864 – July 24, 1932) was an American Major League Baseball catcher. He played all or part of three seasons in the majors: 1886 for the Pittsburgh Alleghenys, 1889 for the Baltimore Orioles, and 1890 for the Pittsburgh Burghers.

== Sources ==
- Career statistics from Baseball Reference · Baseball Reference (Minors) · Retrosheet · Baseball Almanac
