= Jim Gray (infielder) =

American baseball player (1862–1938)

- Infielder
- Born: August 7, 1862; Pittsburgh, Pennsylvania, U.S.
- Died: January 31, 1938 (aged 75); Allegheny, Pennsylvania, U.S.
- Threw: Right

MLB debut
- October 9, 1884, for the Pittsburgh Alleghenys

Last MLB appearance
- August 16, 1893, for the Pittsburgh Pirates

MLB statistics
- Batting average: .304
- Home runs: 1
- Runs batted in: 5
- Stats at Baseball Reference

Teams
- Pittsburgh Alleghenys (1884); Pittsburgh Burghers (1890); Pittsburgh Alleghenys (1890); Pittsburgh Pirates (1893)

James W. Gray (August 7, 1862 – January 31, 1938) was an American Major League Baseball infielder. He played just six games in the major leagues, but they were spread across ten years. He debuted in 1884 with the Pittsburgh Alleghenys, playing in one game as a third baseman. He did not return to the majors until 1890, when he played two games for the Pittsburgh Burghers as a second baseman, then returned to the Alleghenys to play one game as a shortstop. Finally, in 1893, he returned once more to the Alleghenys, now renamed the Pittsburgh Pirates, to play two more games at shortstop.
