= Harry Staley =

American baseball player (1866–1910)

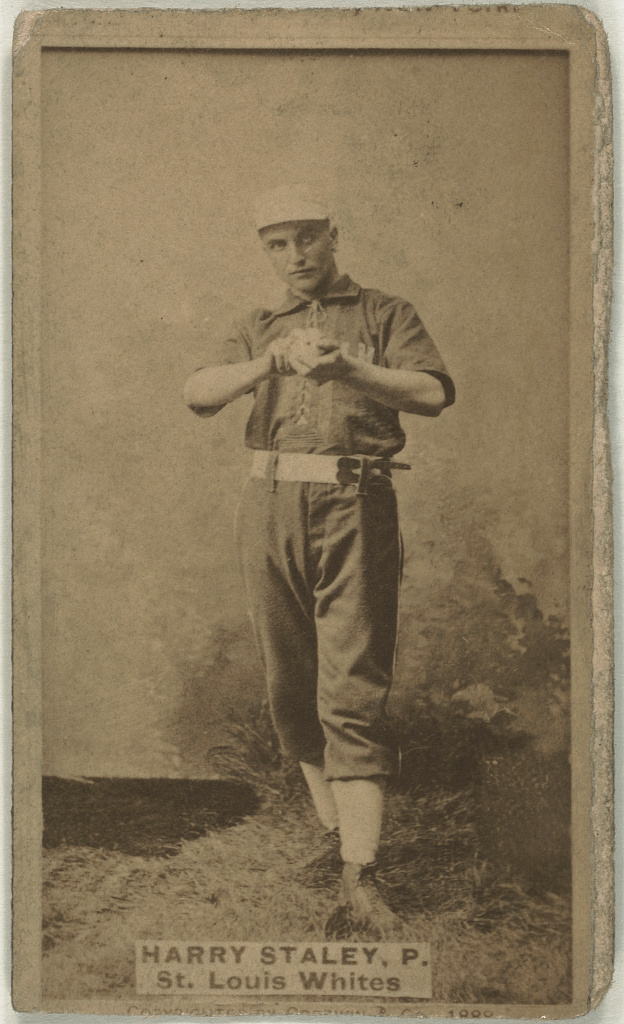
- 1888 baseball card of Staley
- Pitcher
- Born: November 3, 1866; Jacksonville, Illinois, U.S.
- Died: January 12, 1910 (aged 43); Battle Creek, Michigan, U.S.
- Batted: Right Threw: Right

MLB debut
- June 23, 1888, for the Pittsburgh Alleghenys

Last MLB appearance
- July 30, 1895, for the St. Louis Browns

MLB statistics
- Win–loss record: 136-119
- Earned run average: 3.80
- Strikeouts: 746
- Stats at Baseball Reference

Teams
- Pittsburgh Alleghenys (1888–1889); Pittsburgh Burghers (1890); Pittsburgh Pirates (1891); Boston Beaneaters (1891–1894); St. Louis Browns (1895)

Henry Eli Staley (November 3, 1866 – January 12, 1910) was an American professional baseball player who pitched in the major leagues from 1888 to 1895. He played for the Boston Beaneaters, Pittsburgh Alleghenys/Pirates, Pittsburgh Burghers, and St. Louis Browns. On June 1, 1893, in a game against the Louisville Colonels, Staley had nine runs batted in, a record for most RBIs in a game by a pitcher. The record stood for over 70 years until equaled by Atlanta Braves pitcher Tony Cloninger in 1966.
