= Bill Kuehne =

American baseball player (1858–1921)

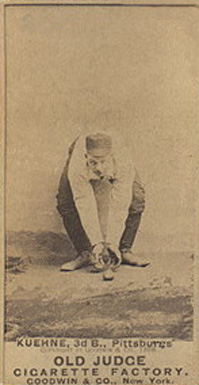
- Third baseman
- Born: October 24, 1858; Leipzig, Kingdom of Saxony
- Died: October 27, 1921 (aged 63); Sulphur Springs, Ohio, U.S.
- Batted: Right Threw: Right

Major league debut
- May 1, 1883, for the Columbus Buckeyes

Last major league appearance
- September 29, 1892, for the St. Louis Browns

Major league statistics
- Batting average: .232
- Hits: 993
- RBIs: 533
- Stats at Baseball Reference

Teams
- Columbus Buckeyes (1883–1884); Pittsburgh Alleghenys (1885–1889); Pittsburgh Burghers (1890); Columbus Solons (1891); Louisville Colonels (1891–1892); St. Louis Browns (1892); Cincinnati Reds (1892); St. Louis Browns (1892)

William J. Kuehne (October 24, 1858 – October 27, 1921) was an American professional baseball infielder who played in the major leagues from 1883 through 1892 for the Columbus Buckeyes (1883–84), Pittsburgh Alleghenys (1885–89), Pittsburgh Burghers (1890), Columbus Solons (1891), Louisville Colonels (1891–92), St. Louis Browns (1892) and Cincinnati Reds (1892). Listed at 5' 8", 185 lb., Kuehne batted and threw right-handed. He was born in Leipzig, Kingdom of Saxony.

Basically a third baseman, Kuehne was able to play all positions but pitcher and catcher. He enjoyed his best years with the Pittsburgh teams, hitting .299 in 1887 as he led the National League with 138 games played in 1888. From 1883 to 1888 he averaged 15.33 triples per season, with a career-high 19 in 1895. Then, in 1892, he played for the Colonels, Browns and Reds during the regular season. Technically, that's three clubs, but he did have two separate stints with the Browns, becoming one of few Major Leaguers to achieve this rare distinction.

In a 10-season career, Kuehne was a .232 hitter (996-for-4284) with 25 home runs and 404 RBI in 1087 games, including 536 runs, 145 doubles, 115 triples, and 151 stolen bases.

Kuehne died in Sulphur Springs, Ohio, three days after his 63rd birthday.

== See also ==
- List of Major League Baseball career triples leaders
- List of players from Germany in Major League Baseball

== Sources ==
- Career statistics from Baseball Reference · Baseball Reference (Minors) · Retrosheet · Baseball Almanac
- Retrosheet
