= Al Maul =

American baseball player and coach (1865–1958)

- Pitcher / Outfielder
- Born: October 9, 1865; Philadelphia, Pennsylvania, U.S.
- Died: May 3, 1958 (aged 92); Philadelphia, Pennsylvania, U.S.
- Batted: Right Threw: Right

MLB debut
- June 20, 1884, for the Philadelphia Keystones

Last MLB appearance
- September 9, 1901, for the New York Giants

MLB statistics
- Win–loss record: 84–80
- Earned run average: 4.45
- Strikeouts: 352
- Batting average: .241
- Stats at Baseball Reference

Teams
- Philadelphia Keystones (1884); Philadelphia Quakers (1887); Pittsburgh Alleghenys (1888–1889); Pittsburgh Burghers (1890); Pittsburgh Pirates (1891); Washington Senators (1893–1897); Baltimore Orioles (1897–1898); Brooklyn Superbas (1899); Philadelphia Phillies (1900); New York Giants (1901)

Career highlights and awards
- NL ERA leader (1895)

Albert Joseph "Smiling Al" Maul (October 9, 1865 – May 3, 1958) was an American professional baseball player. He was a pitcher and outfielder over parts of 15 seasons (1884–1901) in Major League Baseball with the Philadelphia Keystones, Philadelphia Quakers/Phillies, Pittsburgh Alleghenys, Pittsburgh Burghers, Washington Senators, Baltimore Orioles, Brooklyn Superbas, and New York Giants. He led the National League in earned run average in 1895 while playing for Washington. For his career, he compiled an 84–80 record in 188 appearances, with a 4.45 ERA and 352 strikeouts. Maul was born in Philadelphia, and died there at the age of 92. At the time of his death, Maul was the last surviving participant of the Union Association.

== See also ==
- List of Major League Baseball annual ERA leaders
