= Joe Visner =

American baseball player (1859–1945)

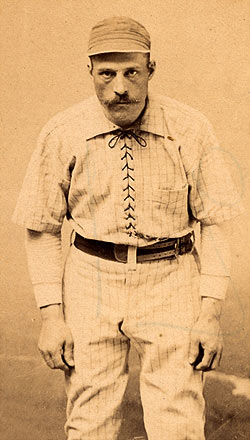
- Catcher / Outfielder
- Born: September 27, 1859; Minneapolis, Minnesota, U.S.
- Died: June 17, 1945 (aged 85); Fosston, Minnesota, U.S.
- Batted: Left Threw: Right

MLB debut
- July 4, 1885, for the Baltimore Orioles

Last MLB appearance
- June 1, 1891, for the St. Louis Browns

MLB statistics
- Batting average: .261
- Home runs: 12
- Runs batted in: 149
- Stats at Baseball Reference

Teams
- Baltimore Orioles (1885); Brooklyn Bridegrooms (1889); Pittsburgh Burghers (1890); Washington Statesmen (1891); St. Louis Browns (1891)

Career highlights and awards
- 1889 American Association Championship

Joseph Paul Visner (born Joseph Paul Vezina: September 27, 1859 – June 17, 1945) was a 19th-century American Major League Baseball outfielder and catcher born in Minneapolis, Minnesota. He played from 1885 to 1891, mostly in the American Association. Visner also has the distinction of being one of the few Native Americans to play professionally in the years prior to the arrival of the much more famous Louis Sockalexis. Visner had a brother named Lawrence Visner, and a sister-in-law by the name of Mary Visner.

== Career ==
Visner began his Major League career with a brief appearance with the Baltimore Orioles in 1885, playing in four games and getting three hits in thirteen at bats.

He didn't appear again until 1889, when he played in 80 games, 53 at catcher for the first place Brooklyn Bridegrooms. The team lost the "World Series" after the season to the New York Giants, six games to three.

After a successful season in Brooklyn, Visner then jumped over to the Players' League and played all of his games as the starting right fielder for the Pittsburgh Burghers. He batted .267, and led the team in runs scored with 110, and hit 22 triples.

When the Players' League folded after just one season, Visner moved back to the American Association and played sparsely for the Washington Statesmen and the St. Louis Browns in 1891.

== Post-career ==
After his major league career, he played some minor league baseball, specifically for the Minneapolis Millers of the Western League in 1894. Visner died in Fosston, Minnesota, at the age of 85, and was interred at the Hansville Cemetery, buried under his birth name of Vezina.

== See also ==
- List of Major League Baseball annual triples leaders
