= Ed Dundon =

American baseball player (1859–1893)

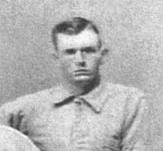
- Dundon in 1884
- Pitcher
- Born: July 10, 1859; Columbus, Ohio, U.S.
- Died: August 18, 1893 (aged 34); Columbus, Ohio, U.S.
- Batted: Unknown Threw: Right

MLB debut
- June 2, 1883, for the Columbus Buckeyes

Last MLB appearance
- September 20, 1884, for the Columbus Buckeyes

MLB statistics
- Win–loss record: 9–20
- Earned run average: 4.25
- Strikeouts: 68
- Stats at Baseball Reference

Teams
- Columbus Buckeyes (1883–1884)

Edward Joseph "Dummy" Dundon (July 10, 1859 – August 18, 1893) was an American professional baseball pitcher. He played for the Columbus Buckeyes for two seasons and was the first deaf player in Major League Baseball history.

== Early life ==
Dundon was born in Columbus, Ohio, in 1859. He was deaf, and from the age of nine, he attended the Ohio Institute for the Education of the Deaf and Dumb in Columbus. Dundon studied book binding and continued to work there as a book binder after graduating. He was also a pitcher for the school's baseball team.

== Professional career ==
Dundon joined the American Association's Columbus Buckeyes in 1883 and became the first deaf man in major league history. He had a win–loss record of 3–16, a 4.48 earned run average, and 31 strikeouts. The following season, he went 6–4 with a 3.78 ERA and 37 strikeouts.

Dundon then played for various minor league teams. In 1885, playing for Atlanta of the Southern League, he went 21–11 with a 1.30 ERA and 210 strikeouts. In 1887, he won 20 games again with Syracuse of the International League. Dundon was fined and suspended several times during this period for drinking. He retired from baseball in 1890.

== Personal life ==
In 1888, Dundon married Mary Lizzie Woolley, a classmate of his from the Ohio Institute. They had a son, Edwin Pius, in 1889.

Dundon died from consumption (tuberculosis) in 1893. He was buried at Mount Calvary Cemetery in Columbus.
