= Samuel B. Childs =

American physician and baseball player (1861–1938)

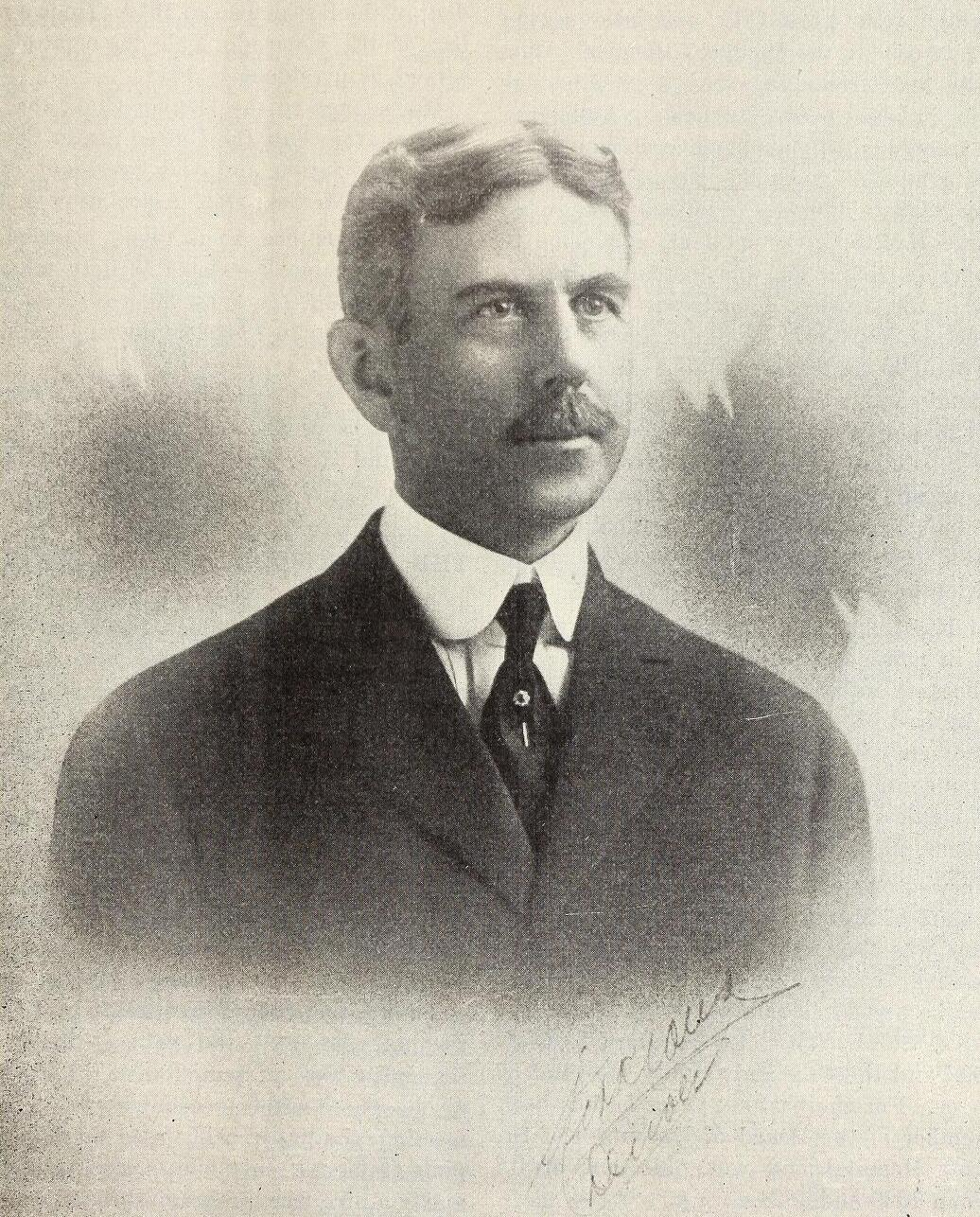
- Born: November 6, 1861; East Hartford, Connecticut, U.S.
- Died: May 21, 1938 (aged 76); Denver, Colorado, U.S.
- Occupations: Physician; Radiologist
- Baseball career
- First baseman

MLB debut
- May 31, 1883, for the Columbus Buckeyes

Last MLB appearance
- May 31, 1883, for the Columbus Buckeyes
- Stats at Baseball Reference

Teams
- Columbus Buckeyes (1883)

Samuel Beresford Childs (November 6, 1861 – May 21, 1938) was an American physician and early radiologist. He was an early promoter of x-ray technology in the Denver, Colorado, where he worked from 1898 to 1937. He was instructor of surgery and later Chair of Anatomy at the University of Denver Medical College, and served as president of several medical organizations, including the first president of the American College of Radiology and Physiotherapy, the Colorado State Medical Society, and the American Medical Golfing Association.

Childs was born in East Hartford, Connecticut, the son of a noted physician, and attended Hartford schools. He graduated from Yale University in 1883, and earned his M. D. from New York University Medical School in 1887.

In his youth he played baseball. He played college ball at Yale University, during which time he played a single game for the Columbus Buckeyes on May 31, 1883. He played in the minors for Hartford from 1884–1885.
