= Jerry Hurley (1890s catcher) =

American baseball player (1863–1950)

- Catcher
- Born: June 15, 1863; Boston, Massachusetts, U.S.
- Died: September 17, 1950 (aged 87); Boston, Massachusetts, U.S.
- Batted: Right Threw: Right

MLB debut
- May 1, 1889, for the Boston Beaneaters

Last MLB appearance
- July 13, 1891, for the Cincinnati Kelly's Killers

MLB statistics
- Batting average: .217
- Home runs: 0
- Runs batted in: 8
- Stats at Baseball Reference

Teams
- Boston Beaneaters (1889); Pittsburgh Burghers (1890); Cincinnati Kelly's Killers (1891)

Jeremiah Joseph Hurley (June 15, 1863 – September 17, 1950) was an American professional baseball player and government official. He played in Major League Baseball, mostly as a catcher, from 1889 to 1891.

Hurley was born in Boston, Massachusetts and enrolled at Boston University. He spent a decade playing professional baseball after he graduated, before his second career as a government official. His brief obituary in The New York Times stated that during his baseball career Hurley "was at one time associated with Connie Mack of the Philadelphia Athletics and Clark Griffith of the Washington Senators." The surviving historical records do not shed any light on the connection between Mack and Hurley, although the two men almost certainly would have known each other. However, records do show that Griffith was one of Hurley's teammates in 1889 with the Milwaukee Brewers of the Western Association.

After playing for at least seven minor-league teams, Hurley finally made it to the major leagues in 1889, when he played one early-season game for the Boston Beaneaters of the National League. Hurley later went on to play for the Pittsburgh Burghers in the Players' League in 1890 and the Cincinnati Kelly's Killers of the American Association in 1891. The Cincinnati team disbanded in mid-season and Hurley opted to spend the remainder of the 1891 season with the California League. He played three more seasons of minor league ball in the South and Midwest before retiring after the 1894 season.

After his playing career, Hurley settled down in his native Boston, married his fellow Bostonian Grace Farren in 1899, and began working for the federal government in the immigration office at the Port of Boston. By 1910, he had risen to the rank of Deputy Commissioner of Immigration. In 1915, Hurley was elected Exalted Ruler of the Boston Elks Lodge. He ended his career working in Washington, DC for the U.S. Immigration Service.

He died in 1950 at the age of 87 at his home in Dorchester, Massachusetts, after what was described merely as a "long illness".

== Sources ==
- Career statistics from Baseball Reference · Baseball Reference (Minors) · Retrosheet · Baseball Almanac
