= Frank Mountain =

American baseball player (1860–1939)

- Pitcher
- Born: May 17, 1860; Fort Edward, New York, US
- Died: November 19, 1939 (aged 79); Schenectady, New York, US
- Batted: Right Threw: Right

MLB debut
- July 19, 1880, for the Troy Trojans

Last MLB appearance
- August 17, 1886, for the Pittsburgh Alleghenys

MLB statistics
- Win–loss record: 58-83
- Earned run average: 3.47
- Strikeouts: 383
- Stats at Baseball Reference

Teams
- Troy Trojans (1880); Detroit Wolverines (1881); Worcester Worcesters (1882); Philadelphia Athletics (1882); Columbus Buckeyes (1883–1884); Pittsburgh Alleghenys (1885–1886)

Career highlights and awards
- Pitched a no-hitter on June 5, 1884

Frank Henry Mountain (May 17, 1860 – November 19, 1939) was an American baseball player from 1880 to 1886. He played seven seasons in Major League Baseball, principally as a pitcher (143 games), outfielder (36 games) and first baseman (18 games). He played for six different major league clubs and saw his most extensive playing time with the Columbus Buckeyes of the American Association, appearing in 128 games for that club during the 1883 and 1884 seasons.

Over the course of seven major league seasons, Mountain compiled a 58-83 (.411) win–loss record and a 3.47 earned run average (ERA). He had his best season in 1884, pitching a no-hitter and compiling a 23-17 record with a 2.45 ERA.

== Early years ==
Mountain was born in Fort Edward, New York, in 1860. His parents were immigrants from Ireland. His father, David Mountain, was a carpenter from Waterford. His mother, Elizabeth, was from County Cork.

Mountain attended Union College in Schenectady, New York, although he did not graduate. He played second base on the Union College baseball team in 1880.

== Professional baseball career ==
=== 1880 to 1882 seasons ===
Mountain began his professional baseball career in July 1880 with the Troy Trojans of the National League. He appeared in only two games for the Trojans and compiled a 1-1 record and 5.29 ERA.

In 1881, Mountain played for the Detroit Wolverines of the National League in the club's inaugural season. He appeared in seven games for the team, all complete games, and compiled a 3-4 record and a 5.25 ERA. He pitched and won both games of a double-header for Detroit in 1881.

Mountain divided his playing time during the 1882 season between the Worcester Worcesters of the National League (18 games) and the Philadelphia Athletics of the American Association (8 games). He compiled a 4-22 (.154) record and a 3.76 ERA with the two clubs in 1882.

=== Columbus ===
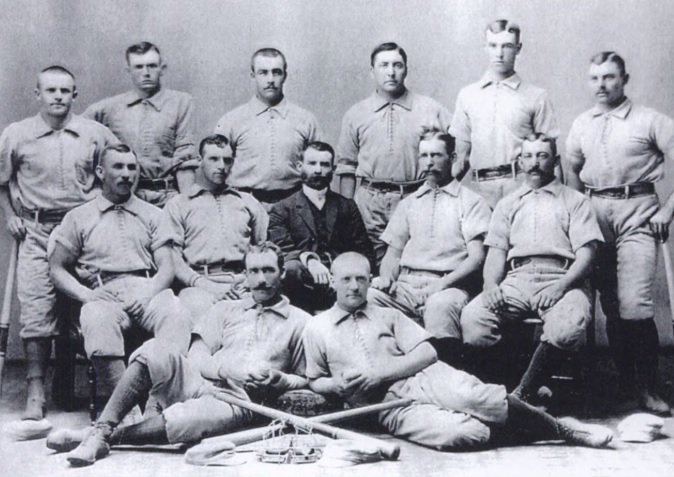
Mountain (front row, far left) with the 1884 Columbus Buckeyes

In 1883, Mountain joined the Columbus Buckeyes of the American Association. He appeared in 128 games, 101 as a pitcher and 29 as an outfielder, for the Buckeyes during the 1883 and 1884 seasons.

Mountain appeared in a career high 59 games as pitcher in 1883. He started all 59 games and threw 57 complete games, four shutouts and 503 innings pitched. He compiled a 26-33 record and led the American Association that season in losses (33), hits allowed (546), earned runs allowed (201), and bases on balls allowed (123).

Mountain's best season was 1884 when he won 23 games, lost 17, pitched 40 complete games, and had a 2.45 ERA for Columbus. His ERA was fifth best in the American Association, and his five shutouts placed him fourth. On June 5 of that season he pitched a no-hitter against the Washington Nationals, winning 12–0.

=== Pittsburgh ===
After the 1884 season, Mountain, along with the entire Columbus team, was sold to the Pittsburgh Alleghenys. However, an injury prevented Mountain from appearing in more than five games in 1885, and he compiled a 1-4 record and 4.30 ERA. In August 1885, the Alleghenys "indefinitely laid off" Mountain until he could again pitch "in his old form." In November 1885, The Sporting Life noted that Mountain's "disability" was "a terrible disappointment to the club", rendering him unable to bat effectively despite having been a strong batter in 1884. Mountain's batting average dropped from .238 in 1883 to .100 in 1884. One account reported that Mountain's arm was damaged by a "drop ball" pitch which was thrown in a motion bringing the arm above the head and then releasing the ball with a "sharp downward snap of the wrist."

Mountain returned to Pittsburgh in 1886. His arm was reported to have recovered, but he injured his ankle in June. He was limited to two games as pitcher and lost both games with a 7.88 ERA. He also appeared in 16 games as a first baseman in 1886 and compiled a .319 on-base percentage in 69 plate appearances. He appeared in his final major league game on August 17, 1886. The following week, a newspaper account reported that his career as pitcher was over, a tryout with Pittsburgh having "proved a jonah."

=== Toledo ===
Starting in May 1888, Mountain served as a minor league manager for the Toledo Maumees of the Tri-State League. As manager, he "blacklisted several players, who went on a strike, and there was a popular howl against him." He was released as manager in July 1888.

=== Career statistics ===
During his seven seasons in the major leagues, Mountain appeared in 194 games (143 as a pitcher). He started 142 games, threw 141 complete games and nine shutouts, and compiled a 58–83 win-loss record with a 3.47 ERA. As a batter, he compiled a .220 batting average with nine home runs and 84 runs scored.

== Family and later years ==
Mountain was married to Sarah Mountain. They had five children: Martin (born 1888), Jennie (born 1890), Rose (born 1894), Raymond (born 1898) and Hugh (born c. 1905). In approximately 1895, Mountain became a clerk for General Electric Company in Schenectady, New York. He worked for General Electric for nearly 40 years, serving for many years as the assistant chief of the factory fire department. He retired in 1931. Mountain died at his home in Schenectady in 1939 at age 79. He was buried at the Most Holy Redeemer Cemetery in Schenectady.

== See also ==
- List of Major League Baseball annual saves leaders
- List of Major League Baseball no-hitters

Achievements
Preceded by Ed Morris	No-hitter pitcher June 5, 1884	Succeeded by Larry Corcoran
