= Fred Carroll =

American baseball player (1864–1904)

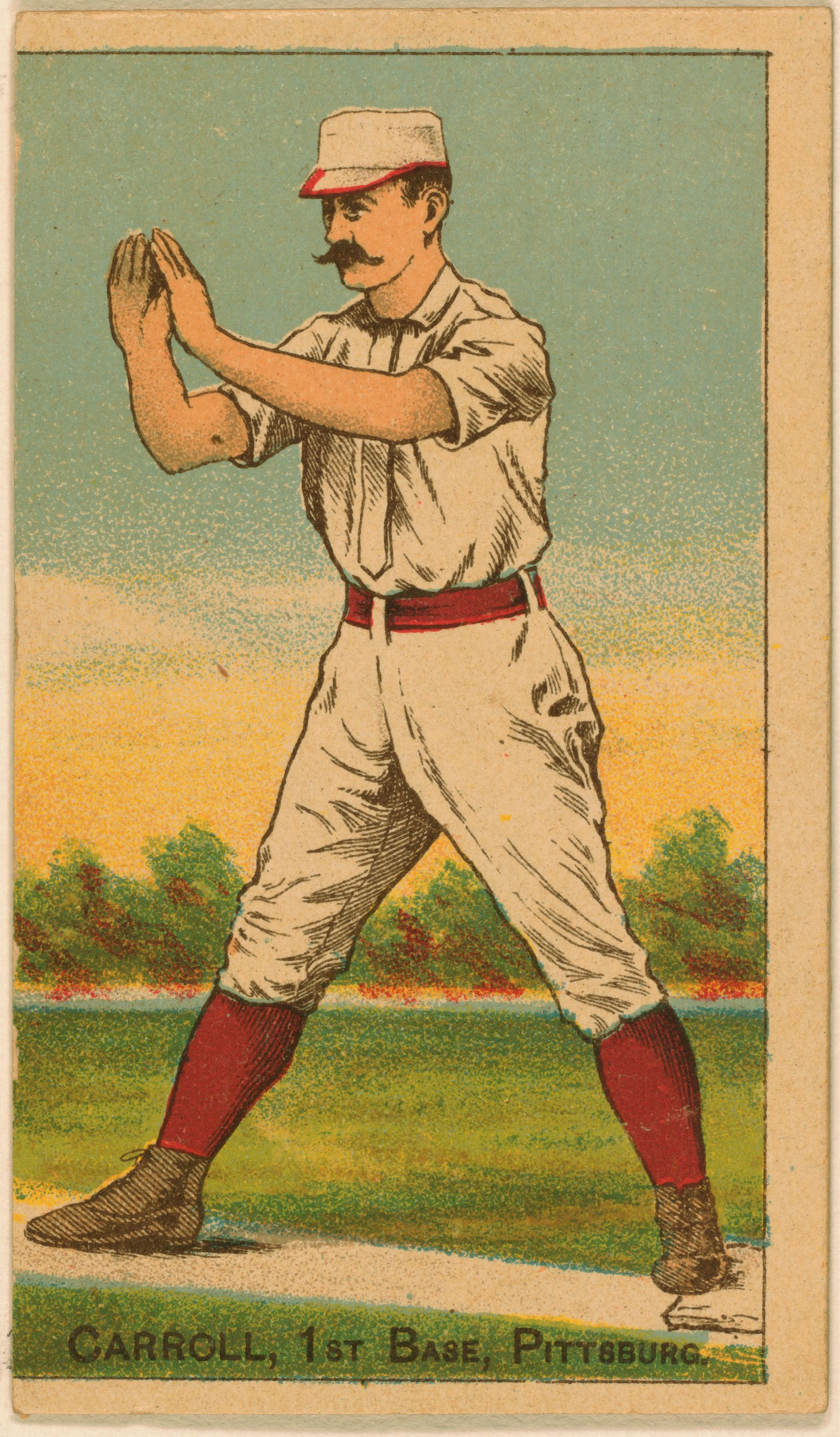
- Fred Carroll 1887 baseball card
- Catcher / Outfield
- Born: July 2, 1864; Sacramento, California, U.S.
- Died: November 7, 1904 (aged 40); San Rafael, California, U.S.
- Batted: Right Threw: Right

MLB debut
- May 1, 1884, for the Columbus Buckeyes

Last MLB appearance
- August 18, 1891, for the Pittsburgh Pirates

MLB statistics
- Batting average: .284
- Hits: 820
- Runs: 546
- Home runs: 27
- Runs batted in: 366
- On-base plus slugging: .778
- Stats at Baseball Reference

Teams
- Columbus Buckeyes (1884); Pittsburgh Alleghenys (1885 – 1889); Pittsburgh Burghers (1890); Pittsburgh Pirates (1891)

Career highlights and awards
- Led NL in on-base percentage (1889, .486); Led NL in OPS (1889, .970); Became the first Pittsburgh player to hit for the cycle (May 2, 1887); Set a major league record with nine hits in a doubleheader (July 5, 1886)

Frederick Herbert Carroll (July 2, 1864 – November 7, 1904) was an American catcher and outfielder in Major League Baseball. From 1884 through 1891, he played with the Columbus Buckeyes (1884) and for the Pittsburgh teams Alleghenys (1885–89), Burghers (1890) and Pirates (1891). Carroll batted and threw right-handed. He was born in Sacramento, California.

== Baseball career ==
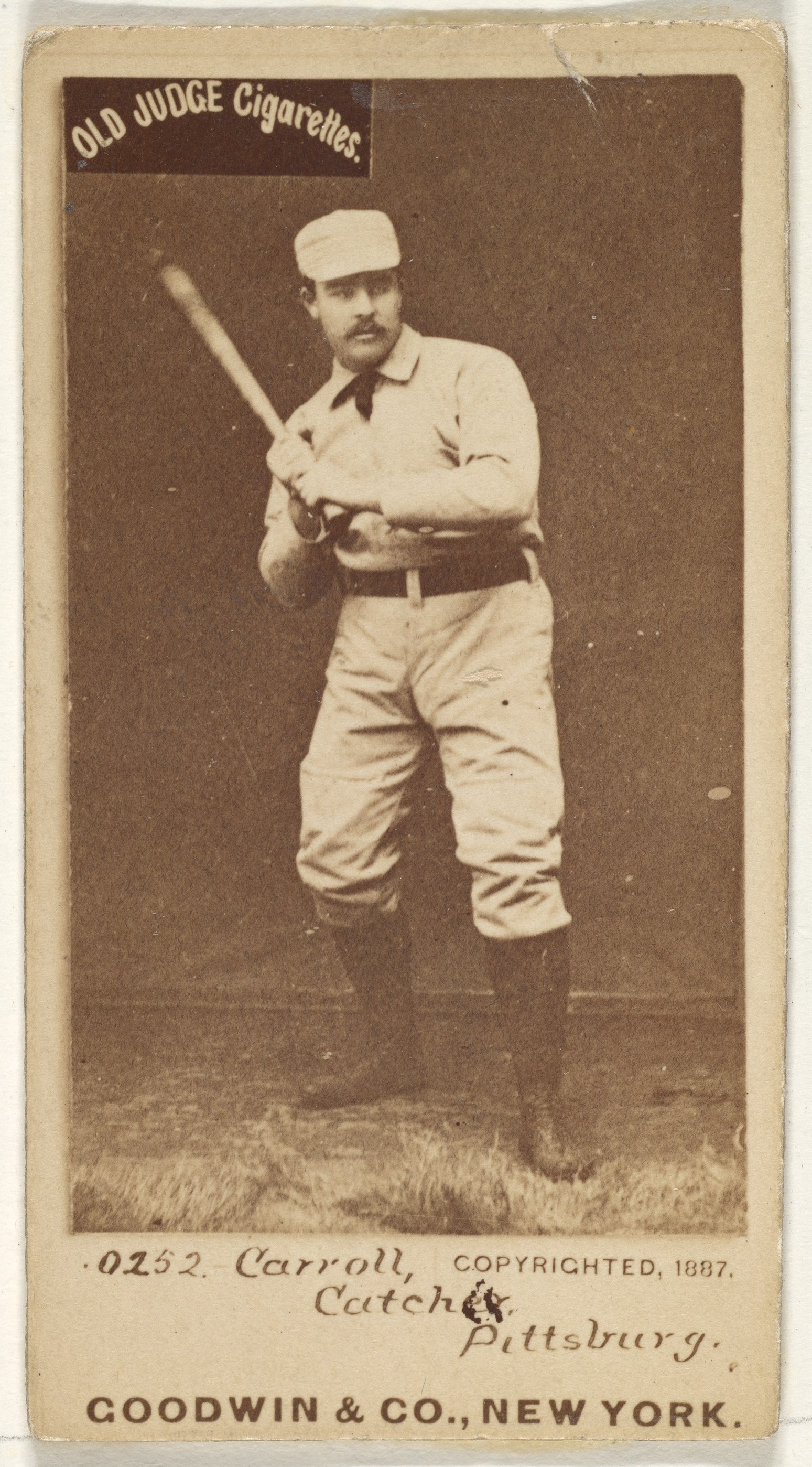
Frederick " Fred" Herbert Carroll, Catcher, Pittsburgh, 1887, Metropolitan Museum of Art

In an eight-season Major League career, Carroll posted a .284 batting average with 27 home runs and 366 RBI in 754 games played.

In 1886 Carroll compiled career-high numbers in hits (140) and doubles (28) while batting .288 with 92 runs and 64 RBI. The next season, he went .328, 71, 54, and had a career-high 15 triples.

In August 1886, Carroll was briefly suspended after fighting with a teammate, first baseman Otto Schomberg. Schomberg was unpopular with his teammates, and the fight started after Carroll referred to him with what The Sporting News subsequently termed "vile names". The pair were separated by Frank Ringo and Ed Glenn, and while Carroll was immediately suspended, the suspension was short-lived. The directors of the Pittsburgh Alleghenys convened a meeting that night, and after the players refused to testify, Carroll was reinstated and his penalty was reduced to a $50 fine.

On May 2, 1887, Carroll became the first Pittsburgh player to hit for the cycle.

Carroll died in San Rafael, California, at age 40.

== Legacy ==
Bill James wrote in his Baseball Abstract that Carroll was the best "young" catcher before Johnny Bench. A victim of the 1890s Brotherhood, he also was a competent outfielder and played shortstop, first base and third as well. James also remarks that Carroll's major league career was shortened by his dislike of living on the East Coast.

Carroll holds a major league catchers record for age 24 in OPS with a .970 mark, set in 1889. The same season, he posted a career-high .330 BA and a .930 fielding percentage as catching. An above-average runner with good instincts, he compiled 137 stolen bases in his career.

At the beginning of the 1887 season Carroll buried his pet monkey, which earlier served as an unofficial team mascot for the team, beneath the home plate at Pittsburgh's Recreation Park in a pre-game ceremony. The stadium stood at the corner of North, Grant, and Pennsylvania Avenues on Pittsburgh's Northside.

== See also ==
- List of Major League Baseball players to hit for the cycle

Achievements
Preceded by Tip O'Neill	Hitting for the cycle May 2, 1887	Succeeded by Tip O'Neill
