= Jocko Fields =

American baseball player (1864–1950)

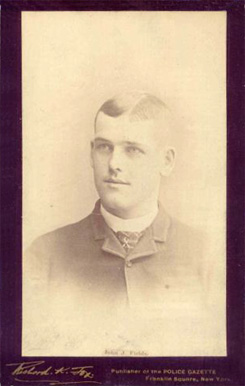
- Outfielder
- Born: October 20, 1864; Cork, Ireland
- Died: October 14, 1950 (aged 85); Jersey City, New Jersey, U.S.
- Batted: Right Threw: Right

MLB debut
- May 31, 1887, for the Pittsburgh Alleghenys

Last MLB appearance
- June 11, 1892, for the New York Giants

MLB statistics
- Batting average: .271
- Home runs: 12
- Runs batted in: 176
- Stats at Baseball Reference

Teams
- Pittsburgh Alleghenys (1887–1889); Pittsburgh Burghers (1890); Pittsburgh Pirates (1891); Philadelphia Phillies (1891); New York Giants (1892)

John Joseph "Jocko" Fields (October 20, 1864 – October 14, 1950) was an American professional baseball player. He was born on October 20, 1864, in Cork, Ireland. Fields made his Major League debut on May 31, 1887. He played for the Pittsburgh Pirates, Pittsburgh Burghers, Philadelphia Phillies and New York Giants. Fields played 341 games in the majors, with 358 hits in 1,319 at bats. He had a lifetime average of .271. He had 12 home runs and 176 RBI. Fields died on October 14, 1950, in Jersey City, New Jersey.
