= Ed Morris (1880s pitcher) =

American baseball player (1862–1937)

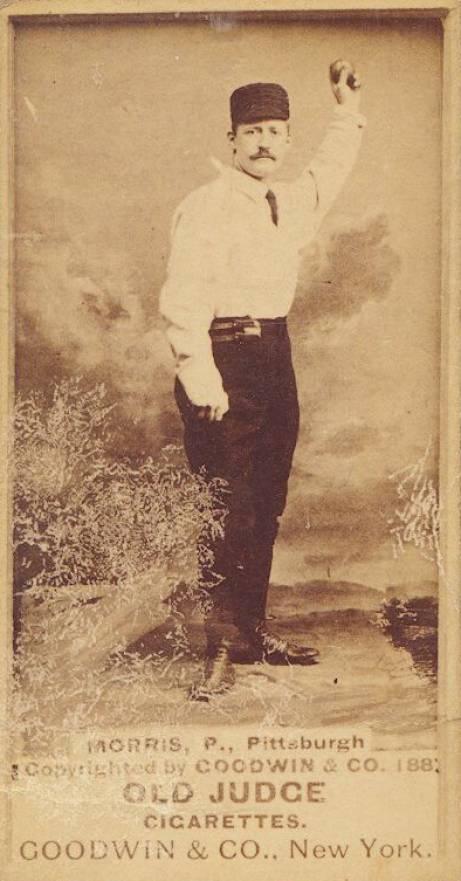
- 1887 baseball card of Morris
- Pitcher
- Born: September 29, 1862; Brooklyn, New York, U.S.
- Died: April 12, 1937 (aged 74); Pittsburgh, Pennsylvania, U.S.
- Batted: Both Threw: Left

MLB debut
- May 1, 1884, for the Columbus Buckeyes

Last MLB appearance
- October 1, 1890, for the Pittsburgh Burghers

MLB statistics
- Win–loss record: 171–122
- Earned run average: 2.82
- Strikeouts: 1,217
- Stats at Baseball Reference

Teams
- Columbus Buckeyes (1884); Pittsburgh Alleghenys (1885–1889); Pittsburgh Burghers (1890)

Career highlights and awards
- AA wins leader (1886); AA strikeouts leader (1885); Pitched a no-hitter on May 29, 1884

Edward "Cannonball" Morris (September 29, 1862 – April 12, 1937) was an American pitcher in Major League Baseball. He played for the Columbus Buckeyes, Pittsburgh Alleghenys, and Pittsburgh Burghers from 1884 to 1890 and had a career win–loss record of 171–122.

== Early life ==
Morris was born in Brooklyn in 1862. The 5 ft 7 in (1.70 m) left-handed pitcher started his professional baseball career in 1879. From 1879 to 1883, Morris played in the Pacific League, New California League, California League, League Alliance, and Interstate Association. In 1883, with the Interstate Association's Reading Actives, he had 199.2 innings pitched and went 16–6 with a 1.80 earned run average (ERA), and 140 strikeouts; he also played as an outfielder and had a .300 batting average.

== Major league career ==
In 1884, Morris made his major league debut with the Columbus Buckeyes of the American Association (AA). That season, he had 429.2 innings pitched and went 34–13 with a 2.18 ERA and 302 strikeouts. He ranked third in the AA in ERA. On May 29, he pitched a no-hitter in a 5–0 win over the Pittsburgh Alleghenys.

The Alleghenys purchased Morris in October 1884. In 1885, Morris had 581 innings pitched and went 39–24 with a 2.35 ERA and 298 strikeouts. He led the league in games pitched (63), games started (63), complete games (63), innings pitched, strikeouts, and shutouts (7). He also ranked second in wins and third in ERA.

In 1886, Morris had 555.1 innings pitched and went 41–20 with a 2.45 ERA and 326 strikeouts. He led the AA in wins and shutouts (12). He also ranked third in innings pitched and strikeouts.

The Alleghenys moved to the National League (NL) in 1887. That season, Morris had 317.2 innings pitched and went 14–22 with a 4.31 ERA and 91 strikeouts.

In 1888, Morris had 480 innings pitched and went 29–23 with a 2.31 ERA and 135 strikeouts. He led the NL in games pitched (55), games started (55), and complete games (54). He also ranked second in innings pitched.

In 1889, Morris had 170 innings pitched and went 6–13 with a 4.13 ERA and 40 strikeouts.

In 1890, Morris played for the Pittsburgh Burghers of the Players' League. He had 144.1 innings pitched and went 8–7 with a 4.86 ERA and 25 strikeouts. That was his last season in professional baseball.

During his major league career, Morris had 2,678 innings pitched and went 171–122 with a 2.82 ERA and 1,217 strikeouts. He also had a .161 batting average. Writer David Nemec described Morris as "the first truly outstanding southpaw pitcher in major league history."

== Later life ==
After his baseball career ended, Morris worked as a deputy warden at a Pennsylvania prison. He died in Pittsburgh in 1937 and was buried in Union Dale Cemetery, Pittsburgh.

== See also ==
- List of Major League Baseball career WHIP leaders
- List of Major League Baseball career complete games leaders
- List of Major League Baseball annual wins leaders
- List of Major League Baseball annual strikeout leaders
- List of Major League Baseball annual shutout leaders
- List of Major League Baseball annual saves leaders
- List of Major League Baseball single-season wins leaders
- List of Major League Baseball no-hitters

Achievements
Preceded by Al Atkinson	No-hitter pitcher May 29, 1884	Succeeded by Frank Mountain
