= Columbus Buckeyes (American Association) =

19th-century professional baseball team

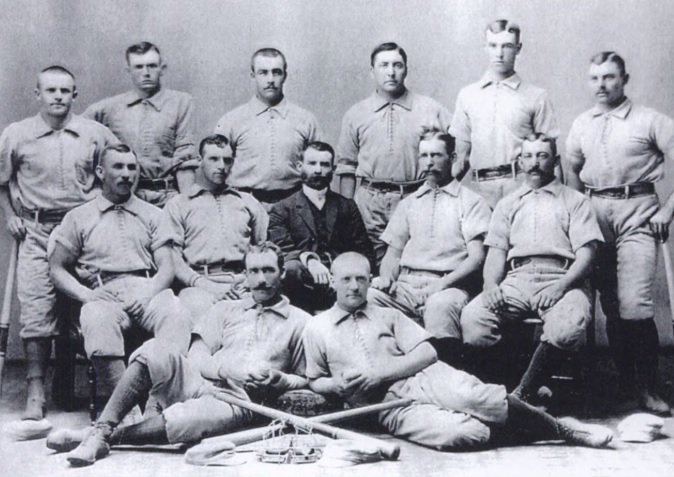
1884 Columbus Buckeyes

The Columbus Buckeyes were a professional baseball team in the American Association from 1883 to 1884. In two seasons they won 101 games and lost 104 for a winning percentage of .493. Their home games were played at Recreation Park in Columbus, Ohio.

The Buckeyes were managed by Horace Phillips in 1883 (32–65) and Gus Schmelz in 1884 (69–39). Some of their top players were pitchers Ed "Cannonball" Morris, Frank Mountain, and Ed Dundon, the first deaf player in the major leagues, and outfielder Tom Brown.

In 1884, the Buckeyes threw two no-hitters in the span of a week. Morris pitched his on May 29 and Mountain threw one on June 5. The 7 day span was the closest margin of 2 no-hitters being thrown by one team in history until Johnny Vander Meer threw 2 consecutive no-hitters for the Cincinnati Reds in a 4-day span on June 11 and 15, 1938.

== See also ==
- 1883 Columbus Buckeyes season
- 1884 Columbus Buckeyes season
- Columbus Buckeyes all-time roster
