= Pittsburgh Burghers =

Information
- League: Players' League
- Location: Allegheny, Pennsylvania
- Ballpark: Exposition Park
- Founded: 1890
- Disbanded: 1890
- League championships: 0
- Manager: Ned Hanlon

The Pittsburgh Burghers were a baseball team in the Players' League, a short-lived Major League that existed only for the 1890 season. The team included a number of players who had jumped from the National League's Pittsburgh Alleghenys (now the Pittsburgh Pirates), including Hall of Famers Pud Galvin, Ned Hanlon, and Jake Beckley. Hanlon served as the team's manager. Meanwhile, John Tener, who would go on to represent Pittsburgh in the United States Congress and be elected the 25th Governor of Pennsylvania, finished his pitching career with the Burghers in 1890. Later Tener would become the president of the National League, and a director of the Philadelphia Phillies.

In its only season, the Burghers finished in 6th place with a 60–68 record. Hall Of Fame first baseman Jake Beckley was a powerhouse slugger for the Burghers. He hit .324 with 10 home runs and 120 RBIs. In addition, he led the PL by hitting 22 triples. But even Beckley's fine work could not overcome the weak hitting of the Pittsburgh team in general. The Burghers finished tied for the worst batting average in the league with a .260 mark. The team played at the Alleghenys' former home, Exposition Park. The stadium and the team was located in Allegheny, Pennsylvania, which was not incorporated into the city of Pittsburgh until 1907. The area is currently known today as the North Side of Pittsburgh, and the site of Exposition Park was later used for Three Rivers Stadium.

When the Players' League came to an end, the Burghers and Alleghenys merged to form a reorganized Pittsburgh National League club, with the owners of both predecessor organizations receiving stock in the consolidated club. Thus the Players' League franchise forms part of the ownership lineage of today's Pirates. The reorganized Pittsburgh team scooped up Lou Bierbauer, a second baseman from the Brooklyn Ward's Wonders of the defunct PL, inadvertently left off the roster of the American Association's Philadelphia Athletics, who as his prior team claimed his rights. This led an AA official to denounce Pittsburgh's actions as "piratical"—an accusation that gained the team the nickname "Pirates".

== See also ==
- 1890 Pittsburgh Burghers season
- Pittsburgh Burghers all-time roster
