= 1882 Major League Baseball season =

1882 MLB season
- League: American Association (AA); National League (NL)
- Sport: Baseball
- Duration: May 2 – October 1, 1882 (AA); May 1 – October 2, 1882 (NL)
- Games: 80 (AA); 84 (NL)
- Teams: 14 (6 in AA, 8 in NL)

Pennant winner
- AA champions: Cincinnati Red Stockings
- AA runners-up: Philadelphia Athletics
- NL champions: Chicago White Stockings
- NL runners-up: Providence Grays

MLB seasons
- ← 1881 1883 →

Locations of teams for the 1882 American Association season
American Association
Locations of teams for the 1882 National League season
National League

The 1882 major league baseball season was contested from May 1 through October 2, 1882. It was the inaugural season for the American Association (AA) and seventh season for the National League (NL). The Cincinnati Red Stockings won the AA pennant, while the Chicago White Stockings won the NL pennant. There was no postseason.

The American Association was established as a six-team league in cities not represented by the National League. The AA was established with the expectation that it would have more of a "liberal policy" and better labor relations, threatening the puritanical NL, which itself had formal behavior codes with associated policies and procedures and a blacklist for players who did not comply to said rules. The AA also refused to recognize the NL's reserve lists.

Three of the six teams of the American Association survive to this day as National League teams; the Cincinnati Red Stockings, Pittsburgh Alleghenys, and St. Louis Brown Stockings are today's Cincinnati Reds, Pittsburgh Pirates, and St. Louis Cardinals.

The 1882 season was the last for the Troy Trojans and Worcester Worcesters.

== Schedule ==
The 1882 schedule consisted of 80 games for all teams in the six-team American Association, and 84 games for all teams in the eight-team National League. Each American Association team was scheduled to play 16 games against the other five teams, while each National League was scheduled to play 12 games against the other seven teams. The 80-game format was unique to the American Association's 1882 season. Meanwhile, the National League had been playing their 84-game schedule, since 1879, though 1882 would be their last. The following season would see both leagues take on a 98-game format, playing 14 games each against their seven opponents.

National League Opening Day took place on May 1 featuring all eight teams, while American Association Opening Day took place on May 2, featuring all six teams. The National League would see its final day of the regular season on October 2 featuring a game between the Boston Red Caps and Providence Grays, while the American Association would see its final day of the regular season on October 1, featuring a game between the Louisville Eclipse and St. Louis Brown Stockings.

== Rule changes ==
The 1882 season saw the following rule changes:

- While the National League determined its championship by number of wins, the American Association would determine its championship by winning percentage.
- Pitchers were now allowed to throw sidearm.
- Seven balls is now considered a base on balls (BB); previously, eight balls were considered base on balls.

== Teams ==
An asterisk (*) denotes the ballpark a team played the minority of their home games at

League	Team	City	Ballpark	Capacity	Manager
American Association	Baltimore Orioles	Baltimore, Maryland	Newington Park	Unknown	Henry Myers
American Association	Cincinnati Red Stockings	Cincinnati, Ohio	Bank Street Grounds	3,000	Pop Snyder
American Association	Louisville Eclipse	Louisville, Kentucky	Eclipse Park	1,200	Denny Mack
American Association	Philadelphia Athletics	Philadelphia, Pennsylvania	Oakdale Park	1,500	Juice Latham
American Association	Pittsburgh Alleghenys	Allegheny, Pennsylvania	Exposition Park	Unknown	Al Pratt
American Association	St. Louis Brown Stockings	St. Louis, Missouri	Sportsman's Park	6,000	Ned Cuthbert
National League	Boston Red Caps	Boston, Massachusetts	South End Grounds	3,000	John Morrill
National League	Buffalo Bisons	Buffalo, New York	Riverside Park (Buffalo)	Unknown	Jim O'Rourke
National League	Chicago White Stockings	Chicago, Illinois	Lakefront Park	5,000	Cap Anson
National League	Cleveland Blues	Cleveland, Ohio	National League Park	Unknown	Jim McCormick
National League	Cleveland Blues	Cleveland, Ohio	National League Park	Unknown	Fred Dunlap
National League	Detroit Wolverines	Detroit, Michigan	Recreation Park	Unknown	Frank Bancroft
National League	Providence Grays	Providence, Rhode Island	Messer Street Grounds	6,000	Harry Wright
National League	Troy Trojans	Greenbush, New York	Riverside Park (Greenbush)*	Unknown*	Bob Ferguson
National League	Troy Trojans	Watervliet, New York	Troy Ball Clubs Grounds	Unknown	Bob Ferguson
National League	Worcester Worcesters	Worcester, Massachusetts	Agricultural County Fair Grounds	Unknown	Freeman Brown
National League	Worcester Worcesters	Worcester, Massachusetts	Agricultural County Fair Grounds	Unknown	Tommy Bond
National League	Worcester Worcesters	Worcester, Massachusetts	Agricultural County Fair Grounds	Unknown	Jack Chapman

1. In today's Pittsburgh, Pennsylvania.
2. In today's Rensselaer, New York.

== Standings ==
=== American Association ===
American Association
Team	W	L	Pct.	GB	Home	Road
Cincinnati Red Stockings	55	25	.688	—	31‍–‍11	24‍–‍14
Philadelphia Athletics	41	34	.547	11½	21‍–‍18	20‍–‍16
Louisville Eclipse	42	38	.525	13	26‍–‍13	16‍–‍25
Pittsburgh Alleghenys	39	39	.500	15	17‍–‍20	22‍–‍19
St. Louis Brown Stockings	37	43	.463	18	24‍–‍20	13‍–‍23
Baltimore Orioles	19	54	.260	32½	7‍–‍25	12‍–‍29

=== National League ===
National League
Team	W	L	Pct.	GB	Home	Road
Chicago White Stockings	55	29	.655	—	35‍–‍10	20‍–‍19
Providence Grays	52	32	.619	3	30‍–‍12	22‍–‍20
Boston Red Caps	45	39	.536	10	27‍–‍15	18‍–‍24
Buffalo Bisons	45	39	.536	10	26‍–‍13	19‍–‍26
Cleveland Blues	42	40	.512	12	21‍–‍19	21‍–‍21
Detroit Wolverines	42	41	.506	12½	24‍–‍18	18‍–‍23
Troy Trojans	35	48	.422	19½	22‍–‍20	13‍–‍28
Worcester Worcesters	18	66	.214	37	12‍–‍30	6‍–‍36

=== Tie games ===
5 tie games (1 in AA, 4 in NL), which are not factored into winning percentage or games behind (and were often replayed again) occurred throughout the season (though in the National League, standings were determined by total wins, not winning percentage).

==== American Association ====
The Baltimore Orioles and Pittsburgh Alleghenys had one tie game each.

- September 9, Pittsburgh Alleghenys vs. Baltimore Orioles, tied at 7.

==== National League ====
The Detroit Wolverines had three tie games. The Cleveland Blues and Troy Trojans had two tie games each. The Boston Red Caps had one tie game.

- June 3, Detroit Wolverines vs. Boston Red Caps, tied at 4.
- August 31, Troy Trojans vs. Detroit Wolverines, tied at 9.
- September 19, Troy Trojans vs. Cleveland Blues, tied at 5.
- September 30, Detroit Wolverines vs. Cleveland Blues, tied at 7.

== Managerial changes ==
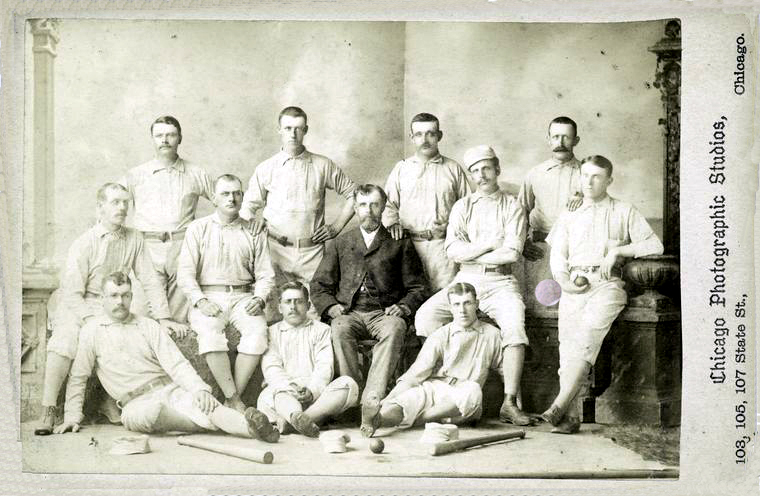
1882 Providence Grays baseball team

=== Off-season ===
Team	Former Manager	New Manager
Boston Red Caps	Harry Wright	John Morrill
Cleveland Blues	John Clapp	Jim McCormick
Providence Grays	Tom York	Harry Wright
Worcester Worcesters	Harry Stovey	Freeman Brown

=== In-season ===
Team	Former Manager	New Manager
Cleveland Blues	Jim McCormick	Fred Dunlap
Worcester Worcesters	Freeman Brown	Tommy Bond
Worcester Worcesters	Tommy Bond	Jack Chapman

== League leaders ==
Any team shown in small text indicates a previous team a player was on during the season.

=== American Association ===
Hitting leaders
Stat	Player	Total
AVG	Pete Browning (LOU)	.378
OPS	Pete Browning (LOU)	.940
HR	Oscar Walker (STL)	7
RBI	Hick Carpenter (CIN)	67
R	Ed Smartwood (PIT)	87
H	Hick Carpenter (CIN)	120

Pitching leaders
Stat	Player	Total
W	Will White (CIN)	40
L	Doc Landis (BAL/PHA)	29
ERA	Denny Driscoll (PIT)	1.21
K	Tony Mullane (LOU)	170
IP	Will White (CIN)	480.0
SV	Eddie Fusselback (STL)	1
WHIP	Guy Hecker (LOU)	0.769

=== National League ===
Hitting leaders
Stat	Player	Total
AVG	Dan Brouthers (BUF)	.368
OPS	Dan Brouthers (BUF)	.950
HR	George Wood (DET)	7
RBI	Cap Anson (CHI)	83
R	George Gore (CHI)	99
H	Dan Brouthers (BUF)	129

Pitching leaders
Stat	Player	Total
W	Jim McCormick (CLE)	36
L	Lee Richmond (WOR)	33
ERA	Larry Corcoran (CHI)	1.95
K	Charles Radbourn (PRO)	201
IP	Jim McCormick (CLE)	595.2
SV	John Ward (PRO)	1
WHIP	Larry Corcoran (CHI)	0.967

== Milestones ==
=== Batters ===
==== Cycles ====
- Curry Foley (BUF):
  - Foley hit for his first cycle, first in franchise history, and first in major league history, on May 25 against the Cleveland Blues.

=== Pitchers ===
==== No-hitters ====
- Tony Mullane (LOU):
  - Mullane threw his first career no-hitter, first no-hitter in franchise history, and the first no-hitter in American Association history, by defeating the Cincinnati Red Stockings 2–0 on September 11.
- Guy Hecker (LOU):
  - Hecker threw his first career no-hitter and the second no-hitter in franchise history, by defeating the Pittsburgh Alleghenys 3–1 on September 19.
- Larry Corcoran (CHI):
  - Corcoran threw his second career no-hitter and the second no-hitter in franchise history, by defeating the Worcester Worcesters 5–0 on September 20.

== Venues ==
The 1882 season saw the formation of the American Association, and with it, saw six new major league teams in six ballparks:

- The Baltimore Orioles played at Newington Park.
- The Cincinnati Red Stockings played at the Bank Street Grounds, at the home of the former Cincinnati Stars.
- The Louisville Eclipse played on Eclipse Park.
- The Philadelphia Athletics played on Oakdale Park.
- The Pittsburgh Alleghenys played on Exposition Park.
- The St. Louis Brown Stockings played on Sportsman's Park.

The Troy Trojans leave Haymakers' Grounds (where they played for two seasons) and move to the Troy Ball Clubs Grounds, where they would play until they folded at the end of the season.

The Troy Trojans continue to host a few games at Riverside Park in nearby Greenbush, New York, playing their first three home games of the season, May 16–18, as well as a fourth game on game 1 of a doubleheader May 30 at the park.

The 1882 season saw three teams play their final games at respective ballparks, before moving to new ballparks for the 1883 season.

- The Baltimore Orioles would play their final game at Newington Park on September 30 against the Philadelphia Athletics, moving to Oriole Park.
- The Cincinnati Red Stockings would play their final game at the Bank Street Grounds on September 28 against the Louisville Eclipse, moving to American Park.
- The Pittsburgh Alleghenys would inadvertently play their final home game at the first Exposition Park in a doubleheader on September 23 against the Louisville Eclipse, as the venue caught fire and was flooded over the offseason. They would temporarily move to the second iteration of Exposition Park for the start of the next season, though would return to the original park shortly.

== See also ==
- 1882 in baseball (Events, Births, Deaths)
