= 1882 Detroit Wolverines season =

1882 Detroit Wolverines
- League: National League
- Ballpark: Recreation Park
- City: Detroit, Michigan
- Record: 42–41 (.506)
- League place: 5th
- Owner: William G. Thompson
- Manager: Frank Bancroft

The 1882 Detroit Wolverines finished the season with a 42–41 record, good for fifth place in the National League.

During the season, Detroit owner William G. Thompson had a private investigator look into umpire Richard Higham, after suspicions of matchfixing, which resulted in Higham becoming the only umpire to be banned in MLB history.

== Regular season ==
=== Season standings ===
National League
Team	W	L	Pct.	GB	Home	Road
Chicago White Stockings	55	29	.655	—	35‍–‍10	20‍–‍19
Providence Grays	52	32	.619	3	30‍–‍12	22‍–‍20
Boston Red Caps	45	39	.536	10	27‍–‍15	18‍–‍24
Buffalo Bisons	45	39	.536	10	26‍–‍13	19‍–‍26
Cleveland Blues	42	40	.512	12	21‍–‍19	21‍–‍21
Detroit Wolverines	42	41	.506	12½	24‍–‍18	18‍–‍23
Troy Trojans	35	48	.422	19½	22‍–‍20	13‍–‍28
Worcester Worcesters	18	66	.214	37	12‍–‍30	6‍–‍36

=== Record vs. opponents ===
1882 National League record Sources:
Team	BSN	BUF	CHI	CLE	DET	PRO	TRO	WOR
Boston	—	7–5	6–6	7–5	8–4–1	6–6	4–8	7–5
Buffalo	5–7	—	6–6	6–6	5–7	6–6	6–6	11–1
Chicago	6–6	6–6	—	9–3	8–4	8–4	9–3	9–3
Cleveland	5–7	6–6	3–9	—	4–7–1	4–8	9–2–1	11–1
Detroit	4–8–1	7–5	4–8	7–4–1	—	3–9	8–4–1	9–3
Providence	6–6	6–6	4–8	8–4	9–3	—	9–3	10–2
Troy	8–4	6–6	3–9	2–9–1	4–8–1	3–9	—	9–3
Worcester	5–7	1–11	3–9	1–11	3–9	2–10	3–9	—

=== Roster ===
1882 Detroit Wolverines
Roster
Pitchers: George Derby; Stump Weidman; Catchers: Charlie Bennett; Sam Trott	Infielders: Bob Casey; Joe Farrell; Tom Forster; Tom Kearns; Walt Kinzie; Henry Luff; Mike McGeary; Tom Morrissey; Martin Powell; Yank Robinson; Dasher Troy; Art Whitney; Julius Willigrod	Outfielders: Ned Hanlon; Lon Knight; George Wood	Manager: Frank Bancroft

== Player stats ==
=== Batting ===
==== Starters by position ====
Note: Pos = Position; G = Games played; AB = At bats; H = Hits; Avg. = Batting average; HR = Home runs; RBI = Runs batted in

Pos	Player	G	AB	H	Avg.	HR	RBI
C	Charlie Bennett	84	342	103	.301	5	51
1B	Martin Powell	80	338	81	.240	0	29
2B	Dasher Troy	40	152	37	.243	0	14
3B	Joe Farrell	69	283	70	.247	1	24
SS	Mike McGeary	34	133	19	.143	0	2
OF	Ned Hanlon	82	347	80	.231	5	38
OF	Lon Knight	86	347	72	.207	0	24
OF	George Wood	84	375	101	.269	7	29

==== Other batters ====
Note: G = Games played; AB = At bats; H = Hits; Avg. = Batting average; HR = Home runs; RBI = Runs batted in

Player	G	AB	H	Avg.	HR	RBI
Sam Trott	32	129	31	.240	0	12
Art Whitney	31	115	21	.183	0	4
Tom Forster	21	76	7	.092	0	2
Walt Kinzie	13	53	5	.094	0	2
Bob Casey	9	39	9	.231	1	7
Yank Robinson	11	39	7	.179	0	2
Tom Kearns	4	13	4	.308	0	1
Henry Luff	3	11	3	.273	0	1
Tom Morrissey	2	7	2	.286	0	0
Julius Willigrod	1	3	1	.333	0	1

=== Pitching ===
==== Starting pitchers ====
Note: G = Games pitched; IP = Innings pitched; W = Wins; L = Losses; ERA = Earned run average; SO = Strikeouts

Player	G	IP	W	L	ERA	SO
Stump Weidman	46	411.0	25	20	2.63	161
George Derby	40	362.0	17	20	3.26	182

==== Other pitchers ====
Note: G = Games pitched; IP = Innings pitched; W = Wins; L = Losses; ERA = Earned run average; SO = Strikeouts

Player	G	IP	W	L	ERA	SO
Art Whitney	3	18.0	0	1	6.00	11

==== Relief pitchers ====
Note: G = Games pitched; W = Wins; L = Losses; SV = Saves; ERA = Earned run average; SO = Strikeouts

Player	G	W	L	SV	ERA	SO
Yank Robinson	1	0	0	0	0.00	0
