= 1882 Worcester Worcesters season =

1882 Worcester Worcesters
- League: National League
- Ballpark: Worcester Driving Park Grounds
- City: Worcester, Massachusetts
- Record: 18–66 (.214)
- League place: 8th
- Managers: Freeman Brown, Tommy Bond, Jack Chapman

The 1882 Worcester Worcesters finished with an 18–66 record, last place in the National League. The team folded after the season. In a game on September 28, the team had only six fans in attendance a number that held the record for the smallest crowd in Major League history until 2015 when the Baltimore riots caused a game to be held "closed to the public."

== Regular season ==
=== Season standings ===
National League
Team	W	L	Pct.	GB	Home	Road
Chicago White Stockings	55	29	.655	—	35‍–‍10	20‍–‍19
Providence Grays	52	32	.619	3	30‍–‍12	22‍–‍20
Boston Red Caps	45	39	.536	10	27‍–‍15	18‍–‍24
Buffalo Bisons	45	39	.536	10	26‍–‍13	19‍–‍26
Cleveland Blues	42	40	.512	12	21‍–‍19	21‍–‍21
Detroit Wolverines	42	41	.506	12½	24‍–‍18	18‍–‍23
Troy Trojans	35	48	.422	19½	22‍–‍20	13‍–‍28
Worcester Worcesters	18	66	.214	37	12‍–‍30	6‍–‍36

=== Record vs. opponents ===
1882 National League record Sources:
Team	BSN	BUF	CHI	CLE	DET	PRO	TRO	WOR
Boston	—	7–5	6–6	7–5	8–4–1	6–6	4–8	7–5
Buffalo	5–7	—	6–6	6–6	5–7	6–6	6–6	11–1
Chicago	6–6	6–6	—	9–3	8–4	8–4	9–3	9–3
Cleveland	5–7	6–6	3–9	—	4–7–1	4–8	9–2–1	11–1
Detroit	4–8–1	7–5	4–8	7–4–1	—	3–9	8–4–1	9–3
Providence	6–6	6–6	4–8	8–4	9–3	—	9–3	10–2
Troy	8–4	6–6	3–9	2–9–1	4–8–1	3–9	—	9–3
Worcester	5–7	1–11	3–9	1–11	3–9	2–10	3–9	—

=== Roster ===
1882 Worcester Worcesters
Roster
Pitchers: John Clarkson; Frank Mountain; Lee Richmond; Catchers: Doc Bushong	Infielders: Ed Cogswell; Fred Corey; George Creamer; Jim Halpin; Arthur Irwin; John Irwin; Fred Mann; Frank McLaughlin; Ed Merrill; John Smith; Harry Stovey	Outfielders: Tommy Bond; Jim Clinton; Jake Evans; Jackie Hayes; Tom O'Brien; Dan O'Leary	Manager: Tommy Bond; Freeman Brown; Jack Chapman

== Player stats ==
=== Batting ===
==== Starters by position ====
Note: Pos = Position; G = Games played; AB = At bats; H = Hits; Avg. = Batting average; HR = Home runs; RBI = Runs batted in

Pos	Player	G	AB	H	Avg.	HR	RBI
C	Doc Bushong	69	253	40	.158	1	15
1B	Harry Stovey	84	360	104	.289	5	26
2B	George Creamer	81	286	65	.227	1	29
3B	Arthur Irwin	84	333	73	.219	0	30
SS	Fred Corey	64	255	63	.247	0	29
OF	Jake Evans	80	334	71	.213	0	25
OF	Jackie Hayes	78	326	88	.270	4	54
OF	Jim Clinton	26	98	16	.163	0	3

==== Other batters ====
Note: G = Games played; AB = At bats; H = Hits; Avg. = Batting average; HR = Home runs; RBI = Runs batted in

Player	G	AB	H	Avg.	HR	RBI
Tom O'Brien	22	89	18	.202	0	7
Fred Mann	19	77	18	.234	0	7
John Smith	19	70	17	.243	0	5
Frank McLaughlin	15	55	12	.218	1	4
Ed Cogswell	13	51	7	.137	0	1
Tommy Bond	8	30	4	.133	0	2
Dan O'Leary	6	22	4	.182	0	2
Jim Halpin	2	8	0	.000	0	0
Ed Merrill	2	8	1	.125	0	4
John Irwin	1	4	0	.000	0	0

=== Pitching ===
==== Starting pitchers ====
Note: G = Games pitched; IP = Innings pitched; W = Wins; L = Losses; ERA = Earned run average; SO = Strikeouts

Player	G	IP	W	L	ERA	SO
Lee Richmond	48	411.0	14	33	3.74	23
Frank Mountain	18	144.0	2	16	3.69	29
John Clarkson	3	24.0	1	2	4.50	3
Tommy Bond	2	12.1	0	1	4.38	2
Jake Evans	1	8.0	0	1	5.62	2

==== Other pitchers ====
Note: G = Games pitched; IP = Innings pitched; W = Wins; L = Losses; ERA = Earned run average; SO = Strikeouts

Player	G	IP	W	L	ERA	SO
Fred Corey	21	139.0	1	13	3.56	36
