= 1882 Troy Trojans season =

1882 Troy Trojans
- League: National League
- Ballpark: Troy Ball Club Grounds
- City: Watervliet, New York
- Record: 35–48 (.422)
- League place: 7th
- Manager: Bob Ferguson

The 1882 season was to be the last for the Troy Trojans. The team finished at 35–48, in seventh place in the National League, and were disbanded after the season.

== Regular season ==
=== Season standings ===
National League
Team	W	L	Pct.	GB	Home	Road
Chicago White Stockings	55	29	.655	—	35‍–‍10	20‍–‍19
Providence Grays	52	32	.619	3	30‍–‍12	22‍–‍20
Boston Red Caps	45	39	.536	10	27‍–‍15	18‍–‍24
Buffalo Bisons	45	39	.536	10	26‍–‍13	19‍–‍26
Cleveland Blues	42	40	.512	12	21‍–‍19	21‍–‍21
Detroit Wolverines	42	41	.506	12½	24‍–‍18	18‍–‍23
Troy Trojans	35	48	.422	19½	22‍–‍20	13‍–‍28
Worcester Worcesters	18	66	.214	37	12‍–‍30	6‍–‍36

=== Record vs. opponents ===
1882 National League record Sources:
Team	BSN	BUF	CHI	CLE	DET	PRO	TRO	WOR
Boston	—	7–5	6–6	7–5	8–4–1	6–6	4–8	7–5
Buffalo	5–7	—	6–6	6–6	5–7	6–6	6–6	11–1
Chicago	6–6	6–6	—	9–3	8–4	8–4	9–3	9–3
Cleveland	5–7	6–6	3–9	—	4–7–1	4–8	9–2–1	11–1
Detroit	4–8–1	7–5	4–8	7–4–1	—	3–9	8–4–1	9–3
Providence	6–6	6–6	4–8	8–4	9–3	—	9–3	10–2
Troy	8–4	6–6	3–9	2–9–1	4–8–1	3–9	—	9–3
Worcester	5–7	1–11	3–9	1–11	3–9	2–10	3–9	—

=== Roster ===
1882 Troy Trojans
Roster
Pitchers: Tim Keefe; Mickey Welch; Catchers: Bill Holbert	Infielders: Roger Connor; Buck Ewing; Bob Ferguson; Fred Pfeffer; John Smith	Outfielders: John Cassidy; Jim Egan; Pete Gillespie; Bill Harbridge; Jim Holdsworth; Chief Roseman	Manager: Bob Ferguson

== Player stats ==
=== Batting ===
==== Starters by position ====
Note: Pos = Position; G = Games played; AB = At bats; H = Hits; Avg. = Batting average; HR = Home runs; RBI = Runs batted in

Pos	Player	G	AB	H	Avg.	HR	RBI
C	Bill Holbert	71	251	46	.183	0	23
1B	Roger Connor	81	349	115	.330	4	42
2B	Bob Ferguson	81	319	82	.257	0	32
3B	Buck Ewing	74	328	89	.271	2	29
SS	Fred Pfeffer	85	330	72	.218	1	43
OF	Pete Gillespie	74	298	82	.275	2	33
OF	Bill Harbridge	32	123	23	.187	0	13
OF	Chief Roseman	82	331	78	.236	1	29

==== Other batters ====
Note: G = Games played; AB = At bats; H = Hits; Avg. = Batting average; HR = Home runs; RBI = Runs batted in

Player	G	AB	H	Avg.	HR	RBI
John Smith	35	149	36	.242	0	14
John Cassidy	29	121	21	.174	0	9
Jim Egan	30	115	23	.200	0	10
Jim Holdsworth	1	3	0	.000	0	0

=== Pitching ===
==== Starting pitchers ====
Note: G = Games pitched; IP = Innings pitched; W = Wins; L = Losses; ERA = Earned run average; SO = Strikeouts

Player	G	IP	W	L	ERA	SO
Tim Keefe	43	375.0	17	26	2.50	116
Mickey Welch	33	281.0	14	16	3.46	53
Jim Egan	12	100.0	4	6	4.14	20

==== Relief pitchers ====
Note: G = Games pitched; W = Wins; L = Losses; SV = Saves; ERA = Earned run average; SO = Strikeouts

Player	G	W	L	SV	ERA	SO
Buck Ewing	1	0	0	0	9.00	0
