= 1882 Cleveland Blues season =

1882 Cleveland Blues
- League: National League
- Ballpark: Kennard Street Park
- City: Cleveland, Ohio
- Record: 42–40 (.512)
- League place: 5th
- Managers: Jim McCormick, Fred Dunlap

The Cleveland Blues finished the 1882 season at 42–40, fifth place in the National League.

== Regular season ==
=== Season standings ===
National League
Team	W	L	Pct.	GB	Home	Road
Chicago White Stockings	55	29	.655	—	35‍–‍10	20‍–‍19
Providence Grays	52	32	.619	3	30‍–‍12	22‍–‍20
Boston Red Caps	45	39	.536	10	27‍–‍15	18‍–‍24
Buffalo Bisons	45	39	.536	10	26‍–‍13	19‍–‍26
Cleveland Blues	42	40	.512	12	21‍–‍19	21‍–‍21
Detroit Wolverines	42	41	.506	12½	24‍–‍18	18‍–‍23
Troy Trojans	35	48	.422	19½	22‍–‍20	13‍–‍28
Worcester Worcesters	18	66	.214	37	12‍–‍30	6‍–‍36

=== Record vs. opponents ===
1882 National League record Sources:
Team	BSN	BUF	CHI	CLE	DET	PRO	TRO	WOR
Boston	—	7–5	6–6	7–5	8–4–1	6–6	4–8	7–5
Buffalo	5–7	—	6–6	6–6	5–7	6–6	6–6	11–1
Chicago	6–6	6–6	—	9–3	8–4	8–4	9–3	9–3
Cleveland	5–7	6–6	3–9	—	4–7–1	4–8	9–2–1	11–1
Detroit	4–8–1	7–5	4–8	7–4–1	—	3–9	8–4–1	9–3
Providence	6–6	6–6	4–8	8–4	9–3	—	9–3	10–2
Troy	8–4	6–6	3–9	2–9–1	4–8–1	3–9	—	9–3
Worcester	5–7	1–11	3–9	1–11	3–9	2–10	3–9	—

=== Roster ===
1882 Cleveland Blues
Roster
Pitchers: George Bradley; Jim McCormick; Catchers: Fatty Briody; John Kelly; Doc Kennedy	Infielders: Herm Doscher; Fred Dunlap; Jack Glasscock; Mike Muldoon; Bill Phillips	Outfielders: John Dwyer; Dude Esterbrook; Bill McGunnigle; John Richmond; Dave Rowe; Orator Shafer; John Tilley; Julius Willigrod	Manager: Fred Dunlap; Jim McCormick

== Player stats ==
=== Batting ===
==== Starters by position ====
Note: Pos = Position; G = Games played; AB = At bats; H = Hits; Avg. = Batting average; HR = Home runs; RBI = Runs batted in

Pos	Player	G	AB	H	Avg.	HR	RBI
C	Fatty Briody	53	194	50	.258	0	13
1B	Bill Phillips	78	335	87	.260	4	47
2B	Fred Dunlap	84	364	102	.280	0	28
3B	Mike Muldoon	84	341	84	.246	6	45
SS	Jack Glasscock	84	358	104	.291	4	46
OF	Orator Shafer	84	313	67	.214	3	28
OF	Dude Esterbrook	45	179	44	.246	0	19
OF	John Richmond	41	140	24	.171	0	11

==== Other batters ====
Note: G = Games played; AB = At bats; H = Hits; Avg. = Batting average; HR = Home runs; RBI = Runs batted in

Player	G	AB	H	Avg.	HR	RBI
George Bradley	30	115	21	.183	0	6
Herm Doscher	25	104	25	.240	0	10
John Kelly	30	104	14	.135	0	5
Dave Rowe	24	97	25	.258	1	17
John Tilley	15	56	5	.089	0	4
Julius Willigrod	9	36	5	.139	0	2
Bill McGunnigle	2	5	1	.200	0	0
John Dwyer	1	3	0	.000	0	1
Doc Kennedy	1	3	1	.333	0	0

=== Pitching ===
==== Starting pitchers ====
Note: G = Games pitched; IP = Innings pitched; W = Wins; L = Losses; ERA = Earned run average; SO = Strikeouts

Player	G	IP	W	L	ERA	SO
Jim McCormick	68	575.2	36	30	2.37	200
George Bradley	18	147.0	6	9	3.73	32
Dave Rowe	1	9.0	0	1	12.00	0
