= 1882 Boston Red Caps season =

1882 Boston Red Caps
- League: National League
- Ballpark: South End Grounds
- City: Boston, Massachusetts
- Record: 45–39 (.536)
- League place: 3rd
- Owner: Arthur Soden
- Manager: John Morrill

The 1882 Boston Red Caps season was the 12th season of the franchise. The Red Caps were a team in transition, as co-founder and longtime manager Harry Wright left the team and was replaced by John Morrill.

== Regular season ==
=== Season standings ===
National League
| Team | W | L | Pct. | GB | Home | Road |
|---|---|---|---|---|---|---|
| Chicago White Stockings | 55 | 29 | .655 | — | 35‍–‍10 | 20‍–‍19 |
| Providence Grays | 52 | 32 | .619 | 3 | 30‍–‍12 | 22‍–‍20 |
| Boston Red Caps | 45 | 39 | .536 | 10 | 27‍–‍15 | 18‍–‍24 |
| Buffalo Bisons | 45 | 39 | .536 | 10 | 26‍–‍13 | 19‍–‍26 |
| Cleveland Blues | 42 | 40 | .512 | 12 | 21‍–‍19 | 21‍–‍21 |
| Detroit Wolverines | 42 | 41 | .506 | 12½ | 24‍–‍18 | 18‍–‍23 |
| Troy Trojans | 35 | 48 | .422 | 19½ | 22‍–‍20 | 13‍–‍28 |
| Worcester Worcesters | 18 | 66 | .214 | 37 | 12‍–‍30 | 6‍–‍36 |

=== Record vs. opponents ===
1882 National League record Sources:
| Team | BSN | BUF | CHI | CLE | DET | PRO | TRO | WOR |
|---|---|---|---|---|---|---|---|---|
| Boston | — | 7–5 | 6–6 | 7–5 | 8–4–1 | 6–6 | 4–8 | 7–5 |
| Buffalo | 5–7 | — | 6–6 | 6–6 | 5–7 | 6–6 | 6–6 | 11–1 |
| Chicago | 6–6 | 6–6 | — | 9–3 | 8–4 | 8–4 | 9–3 | 9–3 |
| Cleveland | 5–7 | 6–6 | 3–9 | — | 4–7–1 | 4–8 | 9–2–1 | 11–1 |
| Detroit | 4–8–1 | 7–5 | 4–8 | 7–4–1 | — | 3–9 | 8–4–1 | 9–3 |
| Providence | 6–6 | 6–6 | 4–8 | 8–4 | 9–3 | — | 9–3 | 10–2 |
| Troy | 8–4 | 6–6 | 3–9 | 2–9–1 | 4–8–1 | 3–9 | — | 9–3 |
| Worcester | 5–7 | 1–11 | 3–9 | 1–11 | 3–9 | 2–10 | 3–9 | — |

=== Roster ===
1882 Boston Red Caps
Roster
| Pitchers: Bobby Mathews; Jim Whitney; Catchers: Pat Deasley | Infielders: Jack Burdock; John Morrill; Ezra Sutton; Sam Wise | Outfielders: Charlie Buffinton; Joe Hornung; Pete Hotaling; Hal McClure; Ed Rowen | Manager: John Morrill |

== Player stats ==
=== Batting ===
==== Starters by position ====
Note: Pos = Position; G = Games played; AB = At bats; H = Hits; Avg. = Batting average; HR = Home runs; RBI = Runs batted in

| Pos | Player | G | AB | H | Avg. | HR | RBI |
|---|---|---|---|---|---|---|---|
| C | Pat Deasley | 67 | 264 | 70 | .265 | 0 | 29 |
| 1B | John Morrill | 83 | 349 | 101 | .289 | 2 | 54 |
| 2B | Jack Burdock | 83 | 319 | 76 | .265 | 0 | 29 |
| 3B | Ezra Sutton | 81 | 319 | 80 | .251 | 2 | 38 |
| SS | Sam Wise | 78 | 298 | 66 | .221 | 4 | 34 |
| OF | Joe Hornung | 85 | 388 | 117 | .302 | 1 | 50 |
| OF | Pete Hotaling | 84 | 378 | 98 | .259 | 0 | 28 |
| OF | Ed Rowen | 83 | 327 | 81 | .248 | 1 | 43 |

==== Other batters ====
Note: G = Games played; AB = At bats; H = Hits; Avg. = Batting average; HR = Home runs; RBI = Runs batted in

| Player | G | AB | H | Avg. | HR | RBI |
|---|---|---|---|---|---|---|
| Charlie Buffinton | 15 | 50 | 13 | .260 | 0 | 4 |
| Hal McClure | 2 | 6 | 2 | .333 | 0 | 0 |

=== Pitching ===
==== Starting pitchers ====
Note: G = Games pitched; IP = Innings pitched; W = Wins; L = Losses; ERA = Earned run average; SO = Strikeouts

| Player | G | IP | W | L | ERA | SO |
|---|---|---|---|---|---|---|
| Jim Whitney | 49 | 420.0 | 24 | 21 | 2.64 | 180 |
| Bobby Mathews | 34 | 285.0 | 19 | 15 | 2.87 | 153 |
| Charlie Buffinton | 5 | 42.0 | 2 | 3 | 4.07 | 17 |

==== Relief pitchers ====
Note: G = Games pitched; W = Wins; L = Losses; SV = Saves; ERA = Earned run average; SO = Strikeouts

| Player | G | W | L | SV | ERA | SO |
|---|---|---|---|---|---|---|
| John Morrill | 1 | 0 | 0 | 0 | 0.00 | 2 |
