= Jim Halpin =

English baseball player (1863–1893)

- Shortstop
- Born: October 7, 1863; England
- Died: January 4, 1893 (aged 29); Boston, Massachusetts, U.S.

MLB debut
- June 15, 1882, for the Worcester Ruby Legs

Last MLB appearance
- August 26, 1885, for the Detroit Wolverines

MLB statistics
- Batting average: .165
- Home runs: 0
- Hits: 38
- Stats at Baseball Reference

Teams
- Worcester Ruby Legs (1882); Washington Nationals (UA) (1884); Detroit Wolverines (1885)

James Nathaniel Halpin (October 4, 1863 – January 4, 1893), a native of England, was a Major League Baseball (MLB) shortstop and third baseman. He played for the Worcester Ruby Legs (1882), Washington Nationals (1884 Union Association), and Detroit Wolverines (1885). At just 18 years of age, he was the youngest player to appear in a National League game in 1882.

Halpin made his major league debut in a home game against the Buffalo Bisons at Worcester Driving Park Grounds. The Ruby Legs defeated future Hall of Famer Pud Galvin 6-3. Halpin played just one more game for Worcester before returning to the big leagues two years later.

In 63 total games he hit .165 (38-for-230) with 5 doubles and 27 runs scored. He was a slightly below-average fielder for his era, making 51 errors in 263 total chances (.806).

Halpin died at the age of 29 in Boston, Massachusetts.
