= Frank Arellanes =

American baseball player (1882–1918)

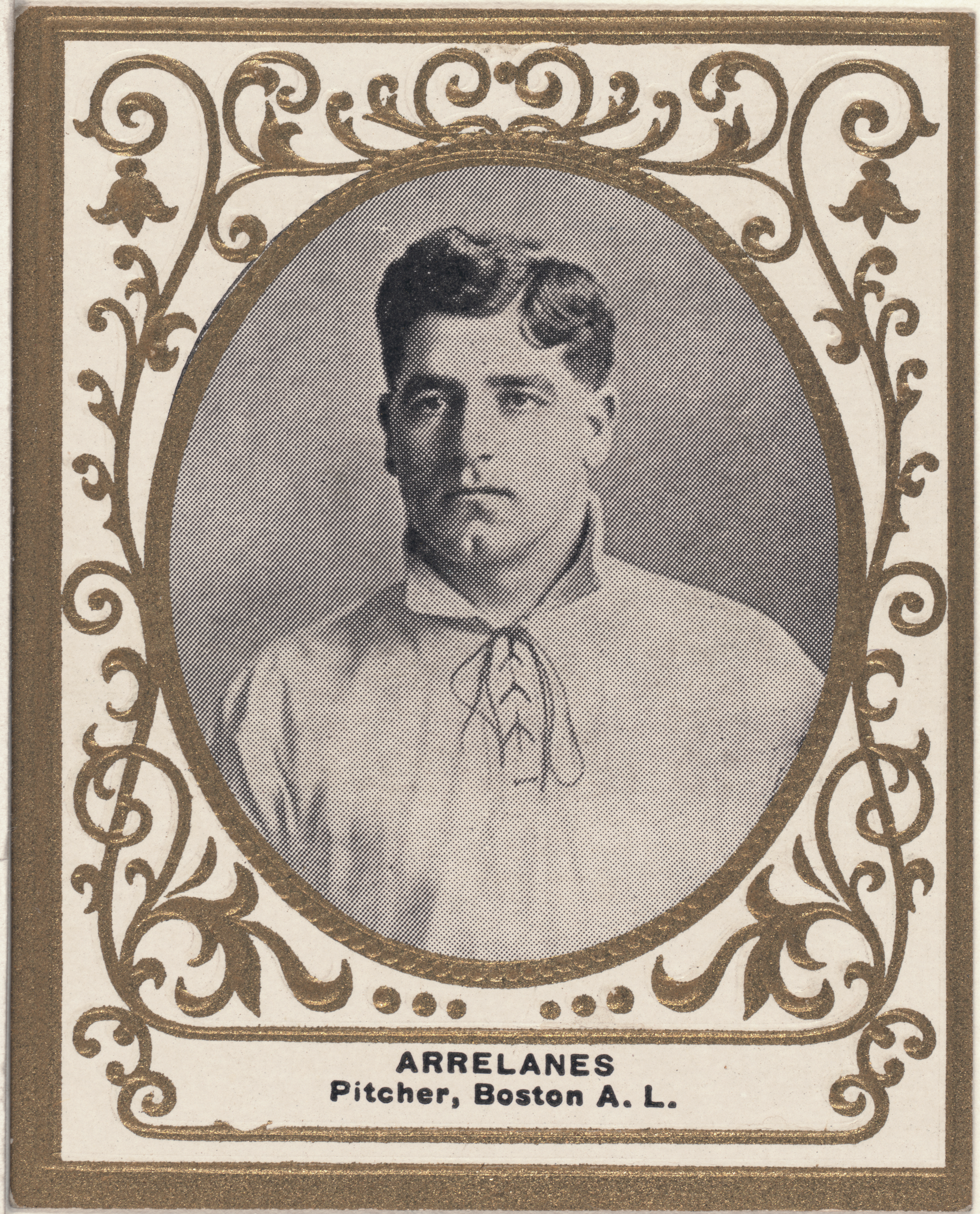
- Arellanes in 1909
- Pitcher
- Born: January 28, 1882; Santa Cruz, California, U.S.
- Died: December 13, 1918 (aged 36); San Jose, California, U.S.
- Batted: Right Threw: Right

MLB debut
- July 17, 1908, for the Boston Red Sox

Last MLB appearance
- August 14, 1910, for the Boston Red Sox

MLB statistics
- Win–loss record: 24–22
- Earned run average: 2.28
- Strikeouts: 148
- Stats at Baseball Reference

Teams
- Boston Red Sox (1908–1910)

Frank Julián Arellanes [ah-ray-yah'-ness] (January 28, 1882 – December 13, 1918) was an American professional baseball starting pitcher. He played three seasons in Major League Baseball for the Boston Red Sox from 1908 through 1910. Listed at 6 ft 0 in (1.83 m), 180 pounds (82 kg), he batted and threw right-handed.

== Biography ==
Born in Santa Cruz, California, Arellanes attended Santa Clara University before joining the Boston Red Sox during the 1908 midseason. He posted a 4–3 record and a 1.82 ERA in eight starts, including a one-hit victory against the Philadelphia Athletics. His most productive season came in 1909, when he recorded 16 wins with a 2.18 ERA as the replacement of Cy Young in the pitching rotation, leading the American League in games finished (15) and saves (eight). His 1910 season was interrupted by illness and he finished at 4–7, 2.88 in 18 games. He ended the year with the Sacramento Solons of the Pacific Coast League, where he pitched a nine-inning no-hitter, losing a 2–0 game.

In a three-season major league career, Arellanes posted a 24–22 record with 148 strikeouts and a 2.28 ERA in 409 2/3 innings of work. A strong control pitcher, he allowed 85 walks for a 1.86 BB/9IP.

Arellanes is sometimes cited as the first Mexican-American to play baseball in the major leagues. However, Sandy Nava was the first known Mexican-American to play in the majors, when he joined the 1882 Providence Grays of the National League.

Arellanes died in San Jose, California, at age 36, a victim of the 1918 Spanish flu pandemic.

== See also ==
- List of Major League Baseball annual saves leaders
