= 1882 Buffalo Bisons season =

1882 Buffalo Bisons
- League: National League
- Ballpark: Riverside Park
- City: Buffalo, New York
- Record: 45–39 (.536)
- League place: T–3rd
- Manager: Jim O'Rourke

The 1882 Buffalo Bisons finished the season with a 45–39 record, good for third place in the National League.

== Regular season ==
=== Season standings ===
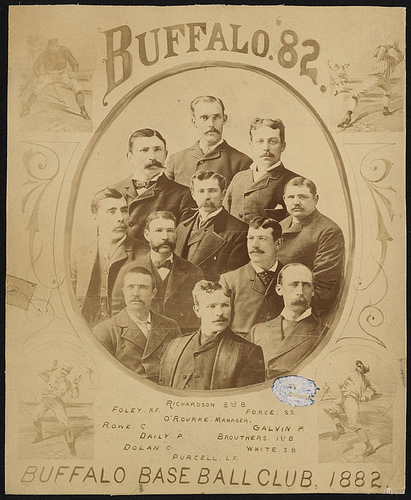

National League
Team	W	L	Pct.	GB	Home	Road
Chicago White Stockings	55	29	.655	—	35‍–‍10	20‍–‍19
Providence Grays	52	32	.619	3	30‍–‍12	22‍–‍20
Boston Red Caps	45	39	.536	10	27‍–‍15	18‍–‍24
Buffalo Bisons	45	39	.536	10	26‍–‍13	19‍–‍26
Cleveland Blues	42	40	.512	12	21‍–‍19	21‍–‍21
Detroit Wolverines	42	41	.506	12½	24‍–‍18	18‍–‍23
Troy Trojans	35	48	.422	19½	22‍–‍20	13‍–‍28
Worcester Worcesters	18	66	.214	37	12‍–‍30	6‍–‍36

=== Record vs. opponents ===
1882 National League record Sources:
Team	BSN	BUF	CHI	CLE	DET	PRO	TRO	WOR
Boston	—	7–5	6–6	7–5	8–4–1	6–6	4–8	7–5
Buffalo	5–7	—	6–6	6–6	5–7	6–6	6–6	11–1
Chicago	6–6	6–6	—	9–3	8–4	8–4	9–3	9–3
Cleveland	5–7	6–6	3–9	—	4–7–1	4–8	9–2–1	11–1
Detroit	4–8–1	7–5	4–8	7–4–1	—	3–9	8–4–1	9–3
Providence	6–6	6–6	4–8	8–4	9–3	—	9–3	10–2
Troy	8–4	6–6	3–9	2–9–1	4–8–1	3–9	—	9–3
Worcester	5–7	1–11	3–9	1–11	3–9	2–10	3–9	—

=== Roster ===
1882 Buffalo Bisons
Roster
Pitchers: James Burke; Hugh Daily; Pud Galvin	Catchers: Tom Dolan; Infielders: Dan Brouthers; Davy Force; Hardy Richardson; Jack Rowe; Deacon White	Outfielders: Curry Foley; Jim O'Rourke; Blondie Purcell	Manager: Jim O'Rourke

== Player stats ==
=== Batting ===
==== Starters by position ====
Note: Pos = Position; G = Games played; AB = At bats; H = Hits; Avg. = Batting average; HR = Home runs; RBI = Runs batted in

Pos	Player	G	AB	H	Avg.	HR	RBI
C	Jack Rowe	75	308	82	.266	1	42
1B	Dan Brouthers	84	351	129	.368	6	63
2B	Hardy Richardson	83	354	96	.271	2	57
3B	Deacon White	83	337	95	.282	1	33
SS	Davy Force	73	278	67	.241	1	28
OF	Curry Foley	84	341	104	.305	3	49
OF	Blondie Purcell	84	380	105	.276	2	40
OF	Jim O'Rourke	84	370	104	.281	2	37

==== Other batters ====
Note: G = Games played; AB = At bats; H = Hits; Avg. = Batting average; HR = Home runs; RBI = Runs batted in

Player	G	AB	H	Avg.	HR	RBI
Tom Dolan	22	89	14	.157	0	8
James Burke	1	4	0	.000	0	0

=== Pitching ===
==== Starting pitchers ====
Note: G = Games pitched; IP = Innings pitched; W = Wins; L = Losses; ERA = Earned run average; SO = Strikeouts

Player	G	IP	W	L	ERA	SO
Pud Galvin	52	445.1	28	23	3.17	162
Hugh Daily	29	255.2	15	14	2.99	116
James Burke	1	4.0	0	1	11.25	0

==== Other pitchers ====
Note: G = Games pitched; IP = Innings pitched; W = Wins; L = Losses; ERA = Earned run average; SO = Strikeouts

Player	G	IP	W	L	ERA	SO
Blondie Purcell	6	31.0	2	1	4.94	9

==== Relief pitchers ====
Note: G = Games pitched; W = Wins; L = Losses; SV = Saves; ERA = Earned run average; SO = Strikeouts

Player	G	W	L	SV	ERA	SO
Curry Foley	1	0	0	0	18.00	0
