= Bob Casey (third baseman) =

Canadian baseball player (1859–1936)

- Third Baseman
- Born: January 26, 1859; Adolphustown, Ontario, Canada
- Died: November 28, 1936 (aged 77); Syracuse, New York
- Batted: Right Threw: Unknown

MLB debut
- July 17, 1882, for the Detroit Wolverines

Last MLB appearance
- July 24, 1882, for the Detroit Wolverines

MLB statistics
- Batting average: .231
- Home runs: 1
- Runs batted in: 7
- Stats at Baseball Reference

Teams
- Detroit Wolverines (1882)

Robert Robinson Casey (January 26, 1859 – November 28, 1936) was a Canadian professional baseball player who played third base in 1882 for the Detroit Wolverines of the National League.
