= Jim Egan (baseball) =

American baseball player (1858–1884)

- Pitcher/Center fielder
- Born: 1858; Derby, Connecticut
- Died: September 26, 1884 (aged 25–26); New Haven, Connecticut
- Batted: Unknown Threw: Left

MLB debut
- May 15, 1882, for the Troy Trojans

Last MLB appearance
- September 29, 1882, for the Troy Trojans

MLB statistics
- Batting average: .200
- Win–loss record: 4–6
- Earned run average: 4.14
- Stats at Baseball Reference

Teams
- Troy Trojans (1882)

James K. Egan (1858 – September 26, 1884), nicknamed "Troy Terrier", was an American Major League Baseball player from New Haven, Connecticut who played one season as a pitcher and center fielder for the Troy Trojans of the National League in 1882. He played in a total of 30 games that season, 18 as an outfielder, and 12 as a pitcher.

Egan died in his hometown at the age of 26 of brain fever.
