= George Derby (baseball) =

American baseball player (1857–1925)

- Pitcher
- Born: July 15, 1857; Webster, Massachusetts, U.S.
- Died: July 4, 1925 (aged 67); Philadelphia, Pennsylvania, U.S.
- Batted: Left Threw: Right

MLB debut
- May 2, 1881, for the Detroit Wolverines

Last MLB appearance
- July 3, 1883, for the Buffalo Bisons

MLB statistics
- Win–loss record: 48-56
- Earned run average: 3.01
- Strikeouts: 428
- Stats at Baseball Reference

Teams
- Detroit Wolverines (1881–1882); Buffalo Bisons (1883)

Career highlights and awards
- NL strikeout leader (1881)

George Henry Derby (July 15, 1857 – July 15, 1925), nicknamed "Jonah", was an American professional baseball player from 1877 to 1883. He played three seasons in Major League Baseball as a right-handed pitcher for the Detroit Wolverines in 1881 and 1882 and for the Buffalo Bisons in 1883.

Derby won 29 games and led the National League in both strikeouts and shutouts as a 24-year-old rookie in 1881. However, after pitching 55 complete games and almost 500 innings in 1881, Derby developed shoulder problems that reduced the velocity of his pitches. His career was cut short, and he played in his final major league game in July 1883 at age 25.

== Early years ==
Derby was born in Webster, Massachusetts, in 1857. He began his professional baseball career at age 19 in 1877 with the Hornellsville, New York, team in the League Alliance. He next played for the Syracuse Stars of the International Association in 1878 and the Washington team of the National Association in 1879 and 1880. In 1880, he compiled a 10–7 record and an 0.57 earned run average (ERA) in 158 innings for Washington.

== Major League Baseball ==
=== Detroit Wolverines ===
==== 1881 season ====
Derby signed with the newly formed Detroit Wolverines for the 1881 season. He was described as "a compactly built, blonde haired, blue-eyed, pleasant-voiced gentleman who was to do all the pitching, and right well did he do his work." During his rookie season, Derby led the National League in both strikeouts (212) and shutouts (9). He also established a franchise record for the Detroit Wolverines that was never broken with 494 2/3 innings pitched in 1881; Derby started 55 games for Detroit, all complete games, and also had one relief appearance. The Detroit Free Press described Derby's rise to stardom in the first part of the 1881 season:

"His speed was moderate, but he was the master of all the crooks and curves that can be imparted to the aerial projectiles. In obedience to his will, the ball twisted out or in, up or down. He held batsmen at his mercy to a degree equalled by no other pitcher. He was the wizard of the pitcher's box, and within a month George H. Derby had risen from obscurity to fame in base ball circles."

He finished the 1881 season with a 29–26 record, a 2.20 earned run average (ERA), and an Adjusted ERA+ of 131. However, late in the 1881 season, Derby's dominance waned, and opposing teams began hitting him more freely. When the Detroit team included him on its reserve list at the end of the 1881 season, some questioned the decision. The Detroit Free Press noted that there were suspicions that Derby's decline had been intentional:

"For three months [Derby and Bennett] formed the most effective battery in the League, playing game after game without error. Wild pitches, wild throws, and passed balls were almost unknown to them. Then they began to make errors . . . In plain words, they both, for some incomprehensible reason, began playing badly . . . Suspicion was common, and it sometimes found a voice, that Detroit's famous battery were 'playing for a release.'"

It was revealed the next year that Derby had begun experiencing shoulder problems late in the 1881 season. Derby complained that he had been unable to "give force to the ball" and therefore pitched fewer games in August and September 1881.

==== 1882 season ====
In 1882, Derby proved fairly effective in the beginning of the season, but his velocity was off. In 1881, Derby had relied on the combination of speed and deceptive delivery. Without the speed, "batters had got accustomed to slow curve pitching, [and] he was hit freely and heavily." Derby started 39 games and pitched 362 innings in 1882 (down from 55 and 494 the year before) and compiled a 17–20 record. His ERA jumped by more than a point from 2.20 in 1881 to 3.26 in 1882.

On September 14, 1882, the Detroit team suspended Derby for playing poorly. The Detroit Free Press wrote that Derby's star had sunk "beneath the base ball horizon" but questioned the fairness of a suspension: "If he [played poorly] intentionally, the sentence is just; if not, it is severe in the extreme. . . . He was wild in his delivery and had so little speed that the batters experienced little difficulty in hitting balls that came across the plate."

=== Buffalo Bisons ===
In October 1882, the Buffalo Bisons announced that Derby would join their team in 1883. Derby's performance in 1883 at Buffalo continued the slide. He started only 13 games for Buffalo and compiled a 2–10 record with a 5.85 ERA. He appeared in his final major league game on July 3, 1883, at age 25.

=== Career statistics ===
Over his three major league seasons, Derby compiled a 48–56 record in 110 appearances, with a 3.01 ERA and 428 strikeouts.

== Later years ==
Derby died in Philadelphia at the age of 67. He was buried at Wellsboro Cemetery in Wellsboro, Pennsylvania.

== See also ==
- List of Major League Baseball annual strikeout leaders
