= John Dwyer (baseball) =

American baseball player

- Catcher/Outfielder
- Born: Lisbon, Illinois
- Batted: Unknown Threw: Unknown

MLB debut
- May 16, 1882, for the Cleveland Blues

Last MLB appearance
- May 16, 1882, for the Cleveland Blues

MLB statistics
- At bats: 3
- RBI: 1
- Home runs: 0
- Batting average: .000
- Stats at Baseball Reference

Teams
- Cleveland Blues (1882)

John E. "Jumbo" Dwyer was an American professional baseball player who played catcher and outfield in one game for the 1882 Cleveland Blues.

== Career ==
Dwyer appeared in one major league game with the Cleveland Blues of the National League on May 16, 1882 against the Detroit Wolverines in Detroit. He started the game as Cleveland's catcher, before moving to left field in the fifth inning. Recounting the game, the Detroit Free Press levied harsh criticism of his play in the field, writing:

"[Cleveland] tried an experiment behind the bat in the person of a big Chicagoan named Dwyer, whom they brought along as a catcher. He was not a success, and when they took the field in the fifth inning he was sent out into left field. This was poor judgement, for while he did not do good work behind the bat, he was utterly useless in the field expect to throw balls back to the diamond, and the Detroit boys faced around and sent them out to him."

Dwyer allowed two passed balls while recording an assist. At the plate, he went hitless but did record a run batted in.

The following day, Dwyer told a Free Press reporter that despite the paper referring to him as a "Chicagoan" the day before, he actually lived in Colorado and had been playing baseball in Iowa, but had been in Chicago the day before the game. Dwyer told the reporter that he was no condition to play the game after not sleeping on his trip from Chicago, and alleged that Cleveland pitcher George Bradley was crossing him up intentionally.

The following spring, Dwyer signed with the Trenton, New Jersey club of the Interstate Association. He played in 25 games before asking for his own release in August.
