= Ed Rowen =

American baseball player (1857–1892)

- Catcher / Outfielder
- Born: October 12, 1857; Bridgeport, Connecticut, U.S.
- Died: February 22, 1892 (aged 34); Bridgeport, Connecticut, U.S.
- Batted: Unknown Threw: Unknown

MLB debut
- May 1, 1882, for the Boston Red Caps

Last MLB appearance
- May 12, 1884, for the Philadelphia Athletics

MLB statistics
- Batting average: .242
- Hits: 130
- Runs: 68
- Stats at Baseball Reference

Teams
- Boston Red Caps (1882); Philadelphia Athletics (1883–1884)

W. Edward Rowen (born October 22, 1857 – February 22, 1892) was an American Major League Baseball player who played catcher from 1882-1884. He would play for the Boston Red Caps and Philadelphia Athletics.
