= Hal McClure =

American baseball player (1859–1919)

- Outfielder
- Born: August 8, 1859; Lewisburg, Pennsylvania, U.S.
- Died: March 1, 1919 (aged 59); Lewisburg, Pennsylvania, U.S.
- Batted: Right Threw: Right

MLB debut
- May 10, 1882, for the Boston Red Caps

Last MLB appearance
- May 11, 1882, for the Boston Red Caps

MLB statistics
- Batting average: .333
- Hits: 2
- Runs: 1
- Stats at Baseball Reference

Teams
- Boston Red Caps (1882)

Harold Murray McClure (August 8, 1859 – March 1, 1919), nicknamed "Mac", was an American former professional baseball player who played outfield in the Major Leagues for the 1882 Boston Red Caps.
