= Oscar Walker =

American baseball player (1854–1889)

- Center fielder/First baseman
- Born: March 18, 1854; Brooklyn, New York
- Died: May 20, 1889 (aged 35); Brooklyn, New York
- Batted: Left Threw: Left

MLB debut
- September 17, 1875, for the Brooklyn Atlantics

Last MLB appearance
- September 4, 1885, for the Baltimore Orioles (AA)

MLB statistics
- Batting average: .254
- Home runs: 11
- RBIs: 51
- Stats at Baseball Reference

Teams
- Brooklyn Atlantics (NA) (1875); Buffalo Bisons (1879–1880); St. Louis Brown Stockings (1882); Brooklyn Atlantics (AA) (1884); Baltimore Orioles (AA) (1885)

Career highlights and awards
- American Association home run champion: 1882

Oscar Walker (March 18, 1854 – May 20, 1889), was an American professional baseball player who played center field and at first base for five different teams in six seasons, from 1875 to 1885. Walker played for the Brooklyn Atlantics, Buffalo Bisons, St. Louis Brown Stockings, and the Baltimore Orioles. Walker died at the age of 35, and is interred at the Cemetery of the Evergreens in his hometown of Brooklyn.

== See also ==
- List of Major League Baseball single-game hits leaders

Preceded by First Champion	American Association Home Run Champion; 1882	Succeeded by Harry Stovey
