= 1882 Chicago White Stockings season =

1882 Chicago White Stockings
- National League champions
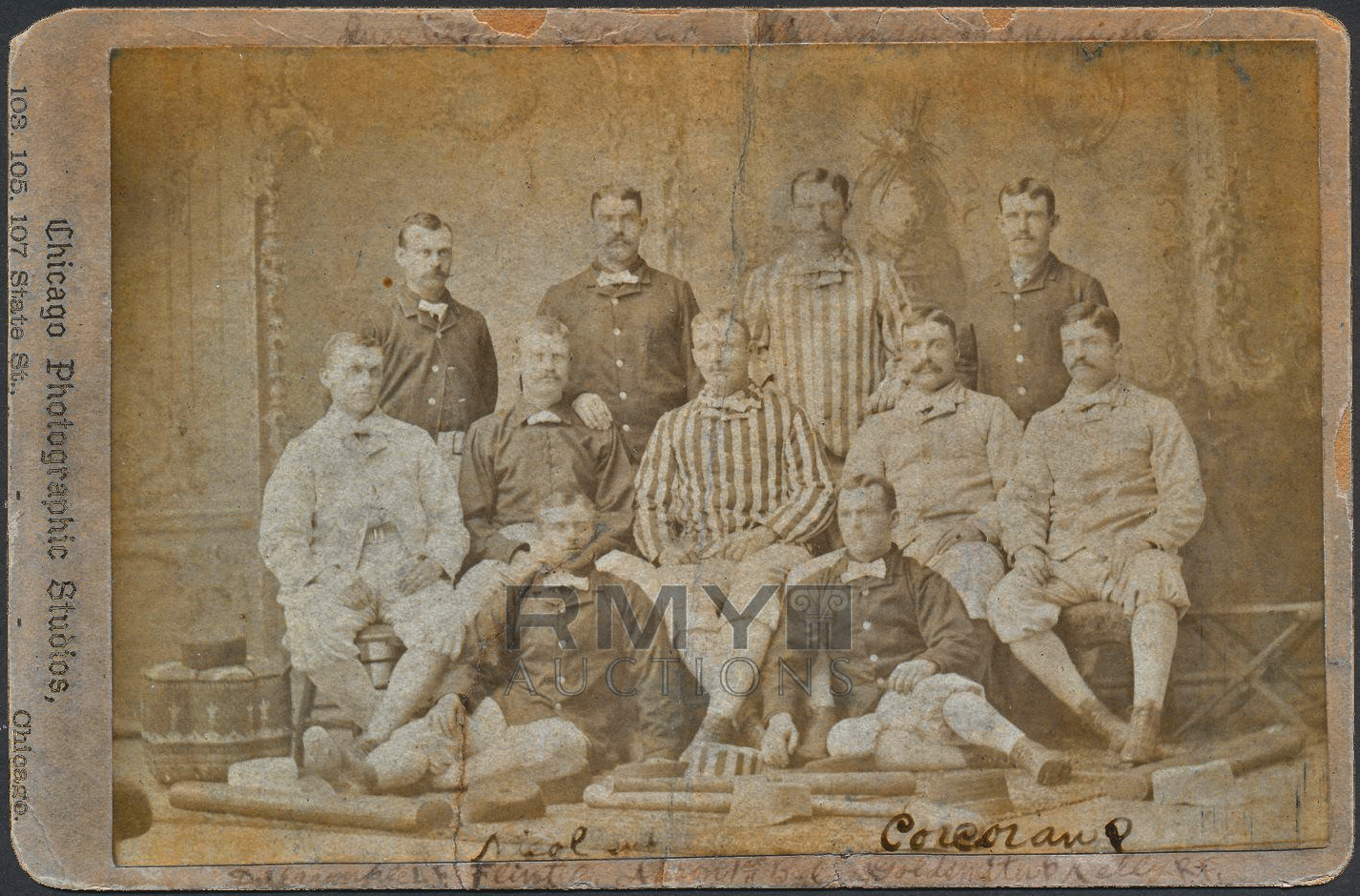
- League: National League
- Ballpark: Lakefront Park
- City: Chicago
- Record: 55–29 (.655)
- League place: 1st
- Owner: Albert Spalding
- Manager: Cap Anson

The 1882 Chicago White Stockings season was the 11th season of the Chicago White Stockings franchise, the seventh in the National League and the fifth at Lakefront Park. The White Stockings won the National League championship with a record of 55–29, 3 games ahead of the second place Providence Grays.

== Regular season ==
=== Season standings ===
National League
Team	W	L	Pct.	GB	Home	Road
Chicago White Stockings	55	29	.655	—	35‍–‍10	20‍–‍19
Providence Grays	52	32	.619	3	30‍–‍12	22‍–‍20
Boston Red Caps	45	39	.536	10	27‍–‍15	18‍–‍24
Buffalo Bisons	45	39	.536	10	26‍–‍13	19‍–‍26
Cleveland Blues	42	40	.512	12	21‍–‍19	21‍–‍21
Detroit Wolverines	42	41	.506	12½	24‍–‍18	18‍–‍23
Troy Trojans	35	48	.422	19½	22‍–‍20	13‍–‍28
Worcester Worcesters	18	66	.214	37	12‍–‍30	6‍–‍36

=== Record vs. opponents ===
1882 National League record Sources:
Team	BSN	BUF	CHI	CLE	DET	PRO	TRO	WOR
Boston	—	7–5	6–6	7–5	8–4–1	6–6	4–8	7–5
Buffalo	5–7	—	6–6	6–6	5–7	6–6	6–6	11–1
Chicago	6–6	6–6	—	9–3	8–4	8–4	9–3	9–3
Cleveland	5–7	6–6	3–9	—	4–7–1	4–8	9–2–1	11–1
Detroit	4–8–1	7–5	4–8	7–4–1	—	3–9	8–4–1	9–3
Providence	6–6	6–6	4–8	8–4	9–3	—	9–3	10–2
Troy	8–4	6–6	3–9	2–9–1	4–8–1	3–9	—	9–3
Worcester	5–7	1–11	3–9	1–11	3–9	2–10	3–9	—

== Roster ==
1882 Chicago White Stockings
Roster
Pitchers: Larry Corcoran; Fred Goldsmith; Catchers: Silver Flint	Infielders: Cap Anson; Tom Burns; King Kelly; Joe Quest; Milt Scott; Ned Williamson	Outfielders: Abner Dalrymple; George Gore; Hugh Nicol	Manager: Cap Anson

== Player stats ==
=== Batting ===
==== Starters by position ====
Note: Pos = Position; G = Games played; AB = At bats; H = Hits; Avg. = Batting average; HR = Home runs; RBI = Runs batted in

Pos	Player	G	AB	H	Avg.	HR	RBI
C	Silver Flint	81	331	83	.251	4	44
1B	Cap Anson	82	348	126	.362	1	83
2B	Tom Burns	84	355	88	.248	0	48
3B	Ned Williamson	83	348	98	.282	3	60
SS	King Kelly	84	377	115	.305	1	55
OF	Abner Dalrymple	84	397	117	.295	1	36
OF	George Gore	84	367	117	.319	3	51
OF	Hugh Nicol	47	186	37	.199	1	16

==== Other batters ====
Note: G = Games played; AB = At bats; H = Hits; Avg. = Batting average; HR = Home runs; RBI = Runs batted in

Player	G	AB	H	Avg.	HR	RBI
Joe Quest	42	159	32	.201	0	15
Milt Scott	1	5	2	.400	0	0

=== Pitching ===
==== Starting pitchers ====
Note: G = Games pitched; IP = Innings pitched; W = Wins; L = Losses; ERA = Earned run average; SO = Strikeouts

Player	G	IP	W	L	ERA	SO
Fred Goldsmith	45	405.0	28	17	2.42	109
Larry Corcoran	39	355.2	27	12	1.95	170

==== Relief pitchers ====
Note: G = Games pitched; W = Wins; L = Losses; SV = Saves; ERA = Earned run average; SO = Strikeouts

Player	G	W	L	SV	ERA	SO
Ned Williamson	1	0	0	0	6.00	1
