= Denny Driscoll =

American baseball player (1855–1886)

- Pitcher
- Born: November 19, 1855; Lowell, Massachusetts, U.S.
- Died: July 11, 1886 (aged 30); Lowell, Massachusetts, U.S.
- Batted: Left Threw: Left

MLB debut
- July 1, 1880, for the Buffalo Bisons

Last MLB appearance
- June 28, 1884, for the Louisville Eclipse

MLB statistics
- Win–loss record: 38–39
- Earned run average: 3.08
- Strikeouts: 171
- Stats at Baseball Reference

Teams
- Buffalo Bisons (1880); Pittsburgh Alleghenys (1882–1883); Louisville Eclipse (1884)

Career highlights and awards
- American Association ERA champion (1882)

John F. "Denny" Driscoll (November 19, 1855 – July 11, 1886) was an American Major League Baseball pitcher from 1880 to 1884. Driscoll played for the Buffalo Bisons, Pittsburgh Alleghenys (the modern-day Pittsburgh Pirates), and Louisville Eclipse. While playing for Pittsburgh, he led the American Association in earned run average in 1882, at 1.21. He went 13-9 that season. In 1883, he was the primary pitcher for the Alleghenys' for most of the season with an 18–21 record, and was the opening day starting pitcher.

== Personal life ==
Driscoll was playing baseball professionally for local teams in Lowell and Nashua, New Hampshire by the age of 15. In November, 1882, he married 18-year old Mary Driscoll of Westford, Massachusetts. Soon afterwards he moved to Westford, most likely in the village of Graniteville, as the Casey family members were employed in the local granite quarries and mills. After the death of his father-in-law, Driscoll supported the Casey family with his baseball salary. In vital records of the early 1880s, he alternately listed his occupation as 'ball player' or 'machinist'. Denny Driscoll had two children with Mary, John William, born September 17, 1883, and Lizzie, born April 21, 1885. Driscoll died in his hometown of Lowell, Massachusetts at the age of 30 of consumption (tuberculosis). He is interred at St. Patrick Cemetery.
