= Buffalo Bisons (disambiguation) =

The Buffalo Bisons (1979–present) are a minor league baseball team currently playing in the International League.

Buffalo Bisons may also refer to:

== Baseball ==
- Buffalo Bisons (1886–1970), a former minor league baseball team, member of the International League from 1912–1970
- Buffalo Bisons (IA), a former baseball team in the International Association in 1878, 1887 and 1888
- Buffalo Bisons (NL), a former baseball team in the National League from 1879 to 1885
- Buffalo Bisons (PL), a former baseball team in the Players' League in 1890

== Basketball ==
- Buffalo Bisons (ABL), a team in the American Basketball League in 1925–1926
- Buffalo Bisons (NBL), a team in the National Basketball League in 1946; now the Atlanta Hawks

== Football ==
- Buffalo Bisons (NFL), a team in the National Football League in 1924–1925, 1927 and 1929
- Buffalo Bisons (AAFC), a former team in the All-America Football Conference in 1946, then renamed the Buffalo Bills

== Ice hockey ==
- Buffalo Bisons (IHL), a former minor professional hockey team that played from 1928 to 1936
- Buffalo Bisons (AHL), a former American Hockey League team that played from 1940 to 1970

== College sports ==
- Former name of the Buffalo Bulls athletic teams of the University at Buffalo, in use from 1915 to 1930
