= Freeman Brown =

Worcester Worcesters
- Manager
- Born: January 31, 1845; Hubbardston, Massachusetts, U.S.
- Died: December 27, 1916 (aged 71); Worcester, Massachusetts, U.S.
- Batted: Unknown Threw: Unknown

debut
- 1882, for the Worcester Worcesters

Last appearance
- 1882, for the Worcester Worcesters

Managerial statistics
- Wins: 9
- Losses: 32

Teams
- Worcester Worcesters (1882)

Freeman Brown (January 31, 1845 – December 27, 1916) was an American Major League Baseball manager for the 1882 Worcester Worcesters baseball team in the National League. Going into the season, Brown had pledged to field a team of "good character" and replaced most of the previous season's roster. He managed the team for 41 games, with a record of 9 wins and 32 losses before he was fired and replaced by Tommy Bond, who was one of the team's outfielders.

Outside of baseball, he worked for the newspapers the Worcester Spy and Worcester Telegram, as well as serving as clerk of the overseers of the poor for 25 years. He died in Worcester, Massachusetts on December 27, 1916.
