= Ed Merrill =

American baseball player (1860–1946)

- Second baseman
- Born: May 22, 1860; Maysville, Kentucky, U.S.
- Died: January 29, 1946 (aged 85); Elmwood Park, Illinois, U.S.

MLB debut
- May 5, 1882, for the Louisville Eclipse

Last MLB appearance
- July 31, 1884, for the Indianapolis Hoosiers

MLB statistics
- Batting average: .176
- Home runs: 0
- Runs scored: 14
- Stats at Baseball Reference

Teams
- Louisville Eclipse (1882); Worcester Ruby Legs (1882); Indianapolis Hoosiers (1884)

Edward Mason Merrill (May 22, 1860 – January 29, 1946) was an American second baseman in Major League Baseball in the 19th century.

== Sources ==
- Career statistics from Baseball Reference · Baseball Reference (Minors) · Retrosheet · Baseball Almanac
