= Ed Cogswell =

English baseball player (1854–1888)

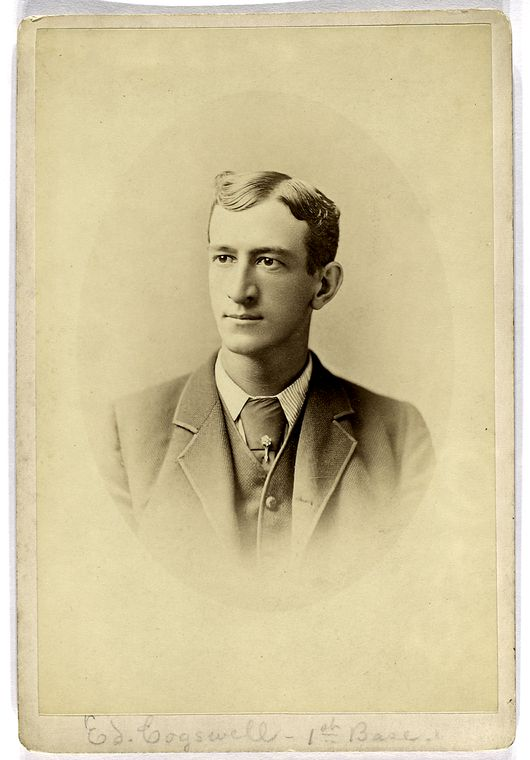
- First baseman
- Born: February 25, 1854; England
- Died: July 27, 1888 (aged 34); Fitchburg, Massachusetts
- Batted: Right Threw: Right

MLB debut
- July 11, 1879, for the Boston Red Stockings

Last MLB appearance
- May 30, 1882, for the Worcester Worcesters

MLB statistics
- Batting average: .294
- On-base percentage: .328
- Slugging percentage: .349
- Stats at Baseball Reference

Teams
- Boston Red Stockings (1879); Troy Trojans (1880); Worcester Worcesters (1882)

Career highlights and awards
- Sixth in the National League in batting average (1879)

Edward Cogswell (February 25, 1854 in England – July 27, 1888 in Fitchburg, Massachusetts) was an English born first baseman in Major League Baseball in the 19th century.

== Sources ==
- Career statistics from Baseball Reference · Baseball Reference (Minors) · Retrosheet · Baseball Almanac
