= Tom Forster (baseball) =

American baseball player (1859–1946)

- Second baseman
- Born: May 1, 1859; New York City, U.S.
- Died: July 17, 1946 (aged 87); New York City, U.S.
- Batted: Right Threw: Unknown

MLB debut
- August 4, 1882, for the Detroit Wolverines

Last MLB appearance
- August 23, 1886, for the New York Metropolitans

MLB statistics
- At bats: 666
- RBI: 40
- Home runs: 1
- Batting average: .197
- Stats at Baseball Reference

Teams
- Detroit Wolverines (1882); Pittsburgh Alleghenys (1884); New York Metropolitans (1885–1886)

Thomas W. Forster (May 1, 1859 – July 17, 1946) was an American professional baseball player who played second base in 1882 for the Detroit Wolverines of the National League and from 1884–1886 for the Pittsburgh Alleghenys and New York Metropolitans of the American Association.
