= Joe Hornung =

American baseball player (1857–1931)

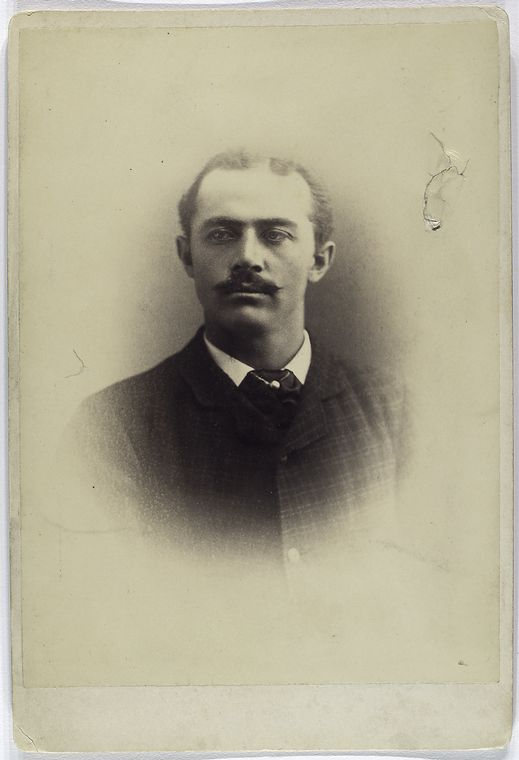
- Left fielder
- Born: June 12, 1857; Carthage, New York, U.S.
- Died: October 30, 1931 (aged 74); Howard Beach, New York, U.S.
- Batted: Right Threw: Right

MLB debut
- May 1, 1879, for the Buffalo Bisons

Last MLB appearance
- October 3, 1890, for the New York Giants

MLB statistics
- Batting average: .257
- Hits: 1,230
- Runs: 788
- Home runs: 31
- Fielding percentage: .929
- Stolen bases: 159
- Stats at Baseball Reference

Teams
- Buffalo Bisons (1879–1880); Boston Red Caps / Beaneaters (1882–1888); Baltimore Orioles (1889); New York Giants (1890); Batavia Giants (1897)

Michael Joseph Hornung (June 12, 1857 – October 30, 1931) was an American professional baseball player. Michael Joseph Hornung was born in Carthage, New York in 1857.

Prior to starting his career in Major League Baseball in 1879 with the Buffalo Bisons, Hornung played for the 1877 and 1878 London Tecumsehs in London, Ontario, Canada, winning the International Association title in 1877.

Hornung ended his major league baseball career in 1890 with the New York Giants, but he spent most of his career (1881–1888) with the Boston Red Caps/Beaneaters. He also spent one season (1889) in the now-defunct American Association. After umpiring for a few seasons in the minor leagues he took on the roll of player / manager for the Batavia Giants franchise on May 25, 1897, making his playing debut on June 14 at the age of 40, he went hitless.

He was remarkable for his nearly flawless play in left field and also known for his peculiar habit of shouting "ubbo ubbo" whenever he got a hit or made a good fielding play. Due to this peculiarity, "Ubbo Ubbo" became Hornung's nickname.

In addition to being an exceptional fielder, Hornung was also a fast baserunner, stealing 39 bases in his final season, and was a fair hitter, batting .302 in 1882. He led all National League outfielders in fielding percentage in 1881, 1882, 1883 and 1886, fielding as high as .948, a very high mark for a time in which most players (including Hornung), didn't wear gloves in the field. Hornung died in 1931 in Howard Beach, New York.

== See also ==
- List of Major League Baseball annual runs scored leaders
- List of Major League Baseball career stolen bases leaders
