= 1882 Providence Grays season =

1882 Providence Grays
- League: National League
- Ballpark: Messer Street Grounds
- City: Providence, Rhode Island
- Record: 52–32 (.619)
- League place: 2nd
- Owner: C. T. Gardner
- Manager: Harry Wright

The Providence Grays hired veteran manager Harry Wright to guide the team in 1882, and the team seemed to improve. They held first place until September 17, but then suffered a losing streak that dropped the team into second place.

After the season ended, they played a three-game postseason series against the Boston Red Caps for the "Championship of New England." Providence won the series, two games to one, thanks to shutouts pitched by John Montgomery Ward and Hoss Radbourn.

== Regular season ==
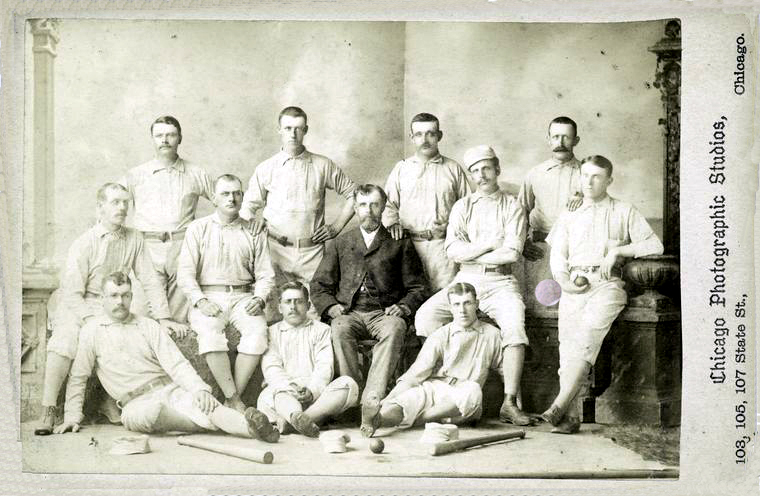
The 1882 Providence Grays

=== Season standings ===
National League
Team	W	L	Pct.	GB	Home	Road
Chicago White Stockings	55	29	.655	—	35‍–‍10	20‍–‍19
Providence Grays	52	32	.619	3	30‍–‍12	22‍–‍20
Boston Red Caps	45	39	.536	10	27‍–‍15	18‍–‍24
Buffalo Bisons	45	39	.536	10	26‍–‍13	19‍–‍26
Cleveland Blues	42	40	.512	12	21‍–‍19	21‍–‍21
Detroit Wolverines	42	41	.506	12½	24‍–‍18	18‍–‍23
Troy Trojans	35	48	.422	19½	22‍–‍20	13‍–‍28
Worcester Worcesters	18	66	.214	37	12‍–‍30	6‍–‍36

=== Record vs. opponents ===
1882 National League record Sources:
Team	BSN	BUF	CHI	CLE	DET	PRO	TRO	WOR
Boston	—	7–5	6–6	7–5	8–4–1	6–6	4–8	7–5
Buffalo	5–7	—	6–6	6–6	5–7	6–6	6–6	11–1
Chicago	6–6	6–6	—	9–3	8–4	8–4	9–3	9–3
Cleveland	5–7	6–6	3–9	—	4–7–1	4–8	9–2–1	11–1
Detroit	4–8–1	7–5	4–8	7–4–1	—	3–9	8–4–1	9–3
Providence	6–6	6–6	4–8	8–4	9–3	—	9–3	10–2
Troy	8–4	6–6	3–9	2–9–1	4–8–1	3–9	—	9–3
Worcester	5–7	1–11	3–9	1–11	3–9	2–10	3–9	—

=== Roster ===
1882 Providence Grays
Roster
Pitchers: Charles Radbourn; Catchers: Barney Gilligan; Sandy Nava; Charlie Reilley	Infielders: Jerry Denny; Jack Farrell; Tim Manning; Joe Start; Dasher Troy; Art Whitney; George Wright	Outfielders: Cliff Carroll; Paul Hines; Charlie Sweeney; John Ward; Tom York	Manager: Harry Wright

== Player stats ==
=== Batting ===
==== Starters by position ====
Note: Pos = Position; G = Games played; AB = At bats; H = Hits; Avg. = Batting average; HR = Home runs; RBI = Runs batted in

Pos	Player	G	AB	H	Avg.	HR	RBI
C	Barney Gilligan	56	201	45	.224	0	26
1B	Joe Start	82	356	117	.329	0	48
2B	Jack Farrell	84	366	93	.254	2	31
3B	Jerry Denny	84	329	81	.246	2	42
SS	George Wright	46	185	30	.162	0	9
OF	Tom York	81	321	86	.268	1	40
OF	Paul Hines	84	379	117	.309	4	34
OF	John Ward	83	355	87	.245	1	39

==== Other batters ====
Note: G = Games played; AB = At bats; H = Hits; Avg. = Batting average; HR = Home runs; RBI = Runs batted in

Player	G	AB	H	Avg.	HR	RBI
Sandy Nava	28	97	20	.206	0	7
Tim Manning	21	76	8	.105	0	8
Cliff Carroll	10	41	5	.122	0	2
Art Whitney	11	40	3	.075	0	1
Dasher Troy	4	17	4	.235	0	1
Charlie Reilley	3	11	2	.182	0	2
Charlie Sweeney	1	4	0	.000	0	0

=== Pitching ===
==== Starting pitchers ====
Note: G = Games pitched; IP = Innings pitched; W = Wins; L = Losses; ERA = Earned run average; SO = Strikeouts

Player	G	IP	W	L	ERA	SO
Charles Radbourn	55	474.0	33	20	2.09	201
John Ward	33	278.0	19	12	2.59	72
