= John Richmond (shortstop) =

American baseball player (1855–1898)

- Shortstop / Center fielder
- Born: March 5, 1855; Philadelphia, Pennsylvania, U.S.
- Died: October 5, 1898 (aged 43); Philadelphia, Pennsylvania, U.S.
- Batted: Unknown Threw: Right

MLB debut
- April 22, 1875, for the Philadelphia Athletics

Last MLB appearance
- July 10, 1885, for the Pittsburgh Alleghenys

MLB statistics
- Games played: 440
- Runs: 239
- Batting average: .238
- Stats at Baseball Reference

Teams
- Philadelphia Athletics (1875); Syracuse Stars (1879); Boston Red Caps (1880–1881); Cleveland Blues (1882); Philadelphia Athletics (1882); Columbus Buckeyes (1883–1884); Pittsburgh Alleghenys (1885)

John H. Richmond (March 5, 1855 – October 5, 1898) was an American Major League Baseball player for eight seasons. He played mainly as a shortstop and center fielder for seven different teams from 1875 to 1885.

Richmond died in his hometown of Philadelphia, Pennsylvania at the age of 43, and is interred at Northwood Cemetery in Philadelphia.
