= John Smith (1880s first baseman) =

American baseball player (1858–1899)

- First baseman
- Born: 1858; New York City, New York, U.S.
- Died: January 6, 1899; San Francisco, California, U.S.
- Batted: Unknown Threw: Unknown

MLB debut
- May 1, 1882, for the Troy Trojans

Last MLB appearance
- September 27, 1882, for the Worcester Worcesters

MLB statistics
- Batting average: .242
- Home runs: 0
- Runs batted in: 19
- Stats at Baseball Reference

Teams
- Troy Trojans (1882); Worcester Worcesters (1882)

John Joseph Smith (1858 – January 6, 1899) was an American professional baseball player who, in 1882, played one season in the National League. In total he appeared in 54 games, all as a first baseman. He played in 35 games with the Troy Trojans and 19 with Worcester Worcesters. Smith had a .242 batting average in 219 career at bats. His listed height during his playing career was 5'11" and his weight was 210. It is unknown if he batted or threw left or right-handed. He was born in New York City, and died on January 6, 1899 at the age of 40 or 41 in San Francisco, California. He is interred at Holy Cross Cemetery in Colma, California.
