= 1882 in baseball =

The following are the baseball events of the year 1882 throughout the world.

== Champions ==
- National League: Chicago White Stockings
- American Association: Cincinnati Red Stockings
- League Alliance: New York Metropolitans

Interleague

- Chicago (NL) vs. Cincinnati (AA) tie 1 game each
- Chicago (NL) defeat New York (LA) 2 games to 1

== Statistical leaders ==
	American Association		National League	
Stat	Player	Total	Player	Total
AVG	Pete Browning (LOU)	.378	Dan Brouthers (BUF)	.368
HR	Oscar Walker (STL)	7	George Wood (DET)	7
RBI	Hick Carpenter (CIN)	67	Cap Anson (CHI)	83
W	Will White (CIN)	40	Jim McCormick (CLE)	36
ERA	Denny Driscoll (PIT)	1.21	Larry Corcoran (CHI)	1.95
K	Tony Mullane (LOU)	170	Charles Radbourn (PRO)	201

== Major league baseball final standings ==
=== American Association final standings ===
American Association
Team	W	L	Pct.	GB	Home	Road
Cincinnati Red Stockings	55	25	.688	—	31‍–‍11	24‍–‍14
Philadelphia Athletics	41	34	.547	11½	21‍–‍18	20‍–‍16
Louisville Eclipse	42	38	.525	13	26‍–‍13	16‍–‍25
Pittsburgh Alleghenys	39	39	.500	15	17‍–‍20	22‍–‍19
St. Louis Brown Stockings	37	43	.463	18	24‍–‍20	13‍–‍23
Baltimore Orioles	19	54	.260	32½	7‍–‍25	12‍–‍29

Locations of teams for the 1882 American Association season
American Association

=== National League final standings ===
National League
Team	W	L	Pct.	GB	Home	Road
Chicago White Stockings	55	29	.655	—	35‍–‍10	20‍–‍19
Providence Grays	52	32	.619	3	30‍–‍12	22‍–‍20
Boston Red Caps	45	39	.536	10	27‍–‍15	18‍–‍24
Buffalo Bisons	45	39	.536	10	26‍–‍13	19‍–‍26
Cleveland Blues	42	40	.512	12	21‍–‍19	21‍–‍21
Detroit Wolverines	42	41	.506	12½	24‍–‍18	18‍–‍23
Troy Trojans	35	48	.422	19½	22‍–‍20	13‍–‍28
Worcester Worcesters	18	66	.214	37	12‍–‍30	6‍–‍36

Locations of teams for the 1882 National League season
National League

== Notable seasons ==
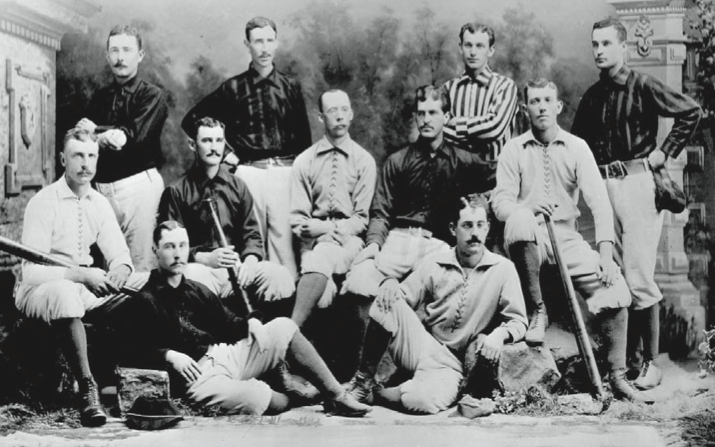
1882 Cincinnati Red Stockings

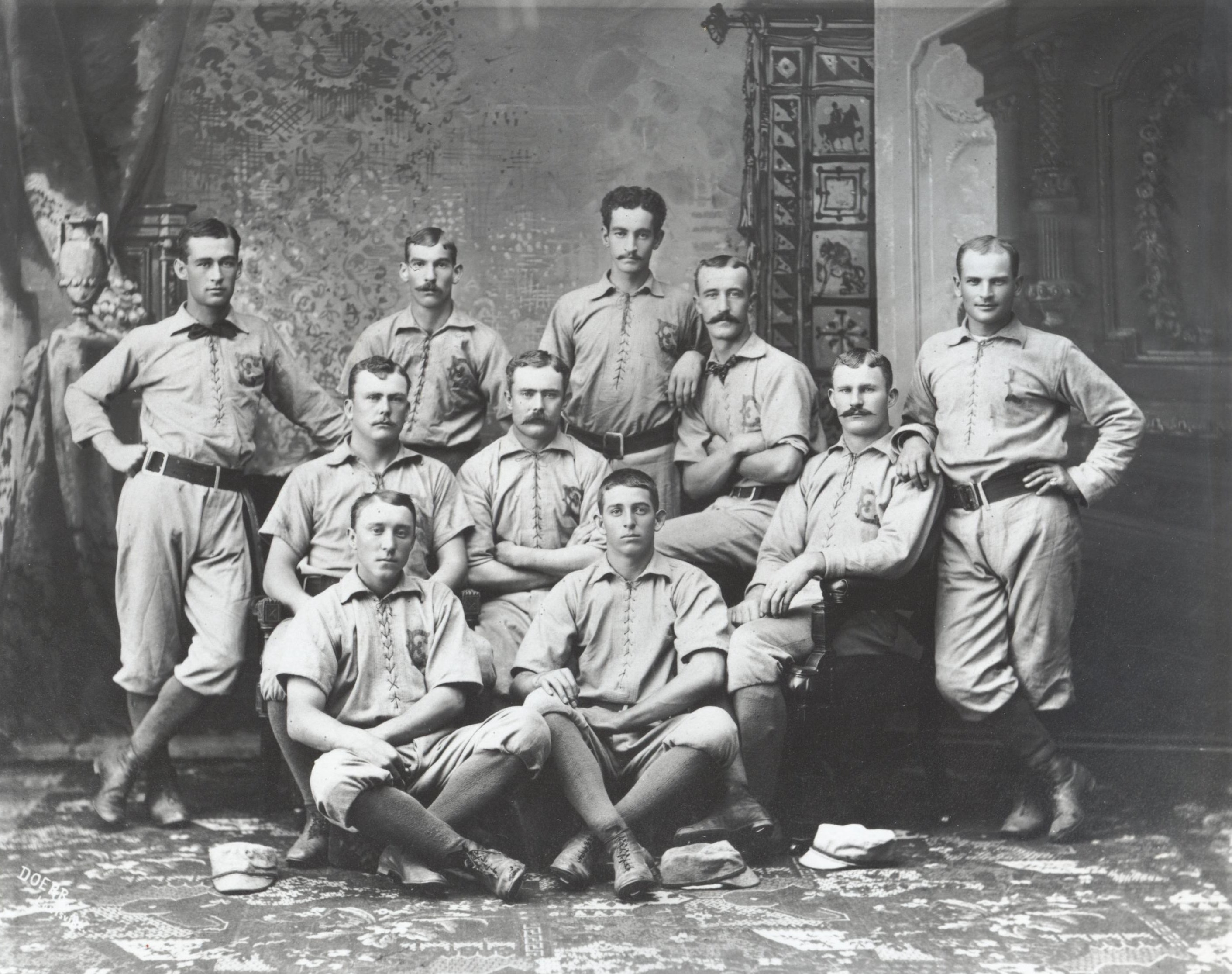
1882 Louisville Eclipse

- Buffalo Bisons first baseman Dan Brouthers leads the NL with 129 hits, a .368 batting average, a .950 OPS, and a 199 OPS+. His 63 runs batted in rank second in the league.
- Cincinnati Red Stockings pitcher Will White has a record of 40–12 and leads the AA with 480 innings pitched, 40 wins, and 8 shutouts. He has a 1.54 earned run average and a 173 ERA+.

== Events ==
=== January–March ===
- January 20 – The state of Kentucky modifies a poorly written law that had banned baseball from being played in the state.
- February 25 – In an effort to increase attendance, the Providence Grays will require their players and the opposition team to parade through the streets of Providence in full uniform on game days, accompanied by a brass band.
- March 11 – After losing Dasher Troy and Sam Wise to the National League after signing contracts to play in the American Association, the AA drops its policy honoring the blacklist and expelled list of the National League.

=== April–June ===
- April 10 – William Hulbert, the man most responsible for the founding of the National League and its sitting president, dies in Chicago. Arthur Soden, owner of the Boston Red Caps, is named Hulbert's temporary replacement for the 1882 season.
- May 1 – The National League season begins.
- May 2
  - The American Association begins play with all 6 teams in action.
  - Charles Comiskey makes his debut with the St. Louis Brown Stockings.
  - John Clarkson makes his debut with the Worcester Worcesters.
- May 5 – Cap Anson of the Chicago White Stockings is called out for walking back to the base after a foul ball was hit. The rule states the baserunner must run back to the base. The rule will be changed in the off season.
- May 6 – Joe Hornung of the Boston Red Caps becomes the first player to hit 2 triples in one inning.
- May 25 – Charles Foley of the Buffalo Bisons becomes the first major leaguer to hit for the cycle. Foley will also become the first player to hit 2 grand slams in one season in 1882.
- May 27 – Mike Moynahan has his finger amputated at the first joint after breaking it during a game. Moynahan will hit .310 as the everyday shortstop for the Philadelphia Athletics in the American Association in 1883.
- June 1 – The Worcester Worcesters lose at home 13–3 in front of 50 people.
- June 5 – In describing the Boston Red Caps 10–2 win over the Detroit Wolverines, the Chicago Tribune states it is the first game in which a team scored 10 runs or more with all of them being earned.
- June 6 – Blondie Purcell of the Buffalo Bisons is fined for cutting the game ball open, which was soggy, rendering it unusable. Purcell did it to force the umpire to put in a new ball so that Bison pitcher Pud Galvin could throw his curve more effectively.
- June 20 – Larry Corcoran, pitcher for the Chicago White Stockings, goes 4–4 at the plate, including the first grand slam in the history of the White Stockings. It is the only home run of Corcoran's career.
- June 22 – The Cincinnati Red Stockings defeat the Pittsburgh Alleghenys on a game-ending triple play in the bottom of the 14th inning.

=== July–September ===
- July 6 – In a game reminiscent of the old National Association, the St. Louis Brown Stockings defeat the Louisville Eclipse by a score of 21–17.
- July 18 – Tony Mullane of the Louisville Eclipse, begins switch-pitching in the 4th inning of a game against the Baltimore Orioles. Mullane pitches left-handed against left-handed batters and right-handed against right-handed batters. Mullane gives up a 2-out homer to Charlie Householder in the 9th and loses 9–8.
- July 24 – Seven Chicago White Stockings collect at least 4 hits and six score at least 4 runs in Chicago's 35–4 pasting of the Cleveland Blues.
- August 17 – The Providence Grays beat the Detroit Wolverines 1–0 in 18 innings. Hall-of-Famer John Montgomery Ward goes the distance for the Grays, while fellow pitcher, teammate and Hall-of-Famer Charley Radbourn, playing right field on his non-pitching day, hits a home run in the 18th to win it. Some consider this the finest played game of the entire 19th century.
- August 18 – Frank Mountain of the Worcester Worcesters and Jim McCormick of the Cleveland Blues become the first pitchers to hit a home run off each other in a game.
- September 2 – The Cincinnati Red Stockings defeat the Louisville Eclipse 6–2 to clinch the first pennant in American Association history.
- September 5 – The Baltimore Orioles play the first 4 innings of their game against Pittsburgh in street clothes because their uniforms have been delayed at the train station.
- September 11 – Tony Mullane of the Louisville Eclipse pitches a no-hitter against the Cincinnati Red Stockings.
- September 19 – Guy Hecker of the Louisville Eclipse is the second Louisville pitcher to throw a no-hitter in 9 days as he hurls one against the Pittsburgh Alleghenys.
- September 20 – Larry Corcoran of the Chicago White Stockings throws a no-hitter against the Worcester Worcesters. It is the 2nd no-hitter of Corcoran's career and the 3rd no-hitter in 10 days in major league baseball.
- September 22 – The National League announces that the Troy Trojans and Worcester Worcesters will be removed from the league following the season.
- September 25 – The lame-duck Worcester Worcesters hold the first double-header while only charging one admission price. This idea will be used by virtually every major league club for nearly 100 years.
- September 28 – The Chicago White Stockings win their 3rd consecutive National League pennant with an 11–5 victory over the Buffalo Bisons.
- September 28 – The Worcester Worcesters lose to the Troy Trojans 4–1 in front of 6 people. The 2 teams are by far the worst in the league and have already been given the official boot from the National League.
- September 29 – Worcester loses again to Troy 10–7 in front of 25 fans in Worcester's last major league game.

=== October–December ===
- October 4 – The Cincinnati Red Stockings of the American Association defeat the Cleveland Blues of the National League 5–2 in an exhibition game. It is the first victory by an AA team after losing the first 22 times to the NL.
- October 6 – In the first post-season meeting of league champions, the Cincinnati Red Stockings of the American Association defeat the Chicago White Stockings 4–0.
- October 7 – The Chicago White Stockings even their series with the Cincinnati Red Stockings with a 2–0 victory. Cincinnati will drop out of the series under threats of expulsion by the American Association.
- October 28 – The Philadelphia Athletics of the American Association announce that the club turned a $22,000 profit during the 1882 season. It is more than any team in the National League made and gives credibility to the fledgling AA.
- November 18 – A court rules in favor of player Charlie Bennett over the Pittsburgh Alleghenys of the American Association. Bennett had signed a $100 agreement to sign a contract to play for Pittsburgh in 1883. Instead, he ended up re-signing with the Detroit Wolverines of the National League. This case will be a factor in the player/owner battles of 1889–1890 that results in the formation of the Players' League.
- November 22 – John Day, owner of the New York Gothams, proposes a resolution that would prohibit teams from signing players who had broken the reserve clause. Both leagues will ultimately adopt this proposal and turn the reserve clause from a protection against roster-raiding by other clubs into an item used against hard-bargaining players. The Gothams will join the National League in 1883.
- December – Abraham G. Mills is elected the new president of the National League.
- December 6 – The National League formally admits the New York Gothams and the Philadelphia Quakers.
- December 14 – The American Association hires a permanent staff of umpires who will be scheduled, paid and overseen by the league rather than individual teams. It will eventually become the standard practice in every professional league, regardless of sport.

== Births ==
- José Borges
- January 28 – Frank Arellanes
- January 31 – Rip Williams
- February 1 – Joe Harris
- February 27 – Art McGovern
- March 8 – Harry Lord
- March 13 – Ralph Glaze
- April 11 – Bill McCarthy
- May 9 – Buck O'Brien
- May 16 – Cy Rigler
- May 18 – Babe Adams
- June 16 – Bobby Keefe
- July 7 – George Suggs
- July 22 – Dick Wallace
- August 2 – Red Ames
- August 18 – Joe Scotland
- August 25 – Connie McGeehan
- August 28 – Garnet Bush
- September 14 – Bunny Madden
- September 17 – Wildfire Schulte
- September 28 – Denny Sullivan
- September 30
  - Gabby Street
  - Art Hoelskoetter
- October 15 – Charley O'Leary
- October 23 – Birdie Cree
- October 29 – Solly Hofman
- November 18 – Jack Coombs
- November 20 – Andy Coakley
- December 1 – Ed Reulbach
- December 23 – George Whiteman

== Deaths ==
- April 10 – William Hulbert, 49, president of the National League, of which he was the principal founder, since 1877, and owner and president of the Chicago White Stockings since 1875.
- August 2 – Gene Kimball, 31, utility player for the 1871 Cleveland Forest Citys.
