= Sandy Nava =

American baseball player (1850–1906)

- Nava (left) and Dan Riordan, battery for the Reno Baseball Club in San Francisco, 1881
- Catcher
- Born: April 12, 1860; San Francisco, California, U.S.
- Died: June 15, 1906 (aged 46); Baltimore, Maryland, U.S.
- Batted: Unknown Threw: Unknown

MLB debut
- May 5, 1882, for the Providence Grays

Last MLB appearance
- June 29, 1886, for the Baltimore Orioles

MLB statistics
- Batting average: .177
- Runs scored: 45
- Runs batted in: 33
- Stats at Baseball Reference

Teams
- Providence Grays (1882–1884); Baltimore Orioles (1885–1886)

Vincent Irwin "Sandy" Nava (born Vincente Simental; April 12, 1860 – June 15, 1906) was an American 19th-century Major League Baseball player for five seasons from 1882 through 1886. Of Mexican heritage, Nava is the first known American-born Hispanic baseball player in the major leagues, and the second of Hispanic descent, behind Cuban-born Steve Bellán.

== Career ==
Born Vincente Simental in San Francisco, California, Nava was playing professional baseball by the age of 18 as a member of the Renos and Athletics in the Pacific Base Ball League, California’s first professional league. James H. Roxburgh, who played in the Amateur Baseball League of California around the same time and knew Nava, remembered him as follows:

Our great pride was centered in the battery of Dan Riordan and Sandy Irwin... little Sandy Irwin was about five feet four inches tall and weighing about 140 pounds. But notwithstanding this, Sandy was a catcher to be proud of and he wore no glove, mask or wind-pad... He was the gamest catcher that ever went behind a bat, barring none, and if you don't believe it, ask any of the old timers.

— James H. Roxburgh, South of Market Journal, April 1929

Nava made his Major League debut for the 1882 Providence Grays as a catcher. He was brought in to be fellow San Francisco native Charlie Sweeney's catcher. Nava's history in professional baseball showed two sides; when he was growing up in San Francisco, he apparently tried to hide his Mexican heritage and went by names like Irwin Sandy or Vincent Irwin, but when he came to the East Coast, he returned to his name of Nava and the Providence team tried to promote his "Spanish" heritage.

He played in 28 games his rookie season, and batted .206, while scoring 15 runs. He returned to the Grays for two more seasons, continuing to be the back-up catcher to Barney Gilligan, having his best year in 1883 when he batted .240 and scored 18 runs in 29 games. Even though he didn't hit well, he stayed on as Sweeney's personal catcher, until Sweeney was expelled from the team by refusing to leave a game in favor of Cyclone Miller. The team decided to leave Nava and Miller behind on a road trip and later loaned them to a military team in Fort Monroe, Virginia.

For the 1884 and 1885 seasons, Nava played for the Baltimore Orioles of the American Association, and played in just 10 games in those two years before leaving the Majors.

== Post-career ==
Nava was of Mexican descent; however, he was identified as Black, Indian, Portuguese, Spanish, and Cuban throughout his baseball career. He later moved to Baltimore, Maryland and worked as an upholsterer. He died there on June 15, 1906, and is interred at Trinity Cemetery in Baltimore, a segregated cemetery.
