= Julius Willigrod =

American baseball player (1857–1906)

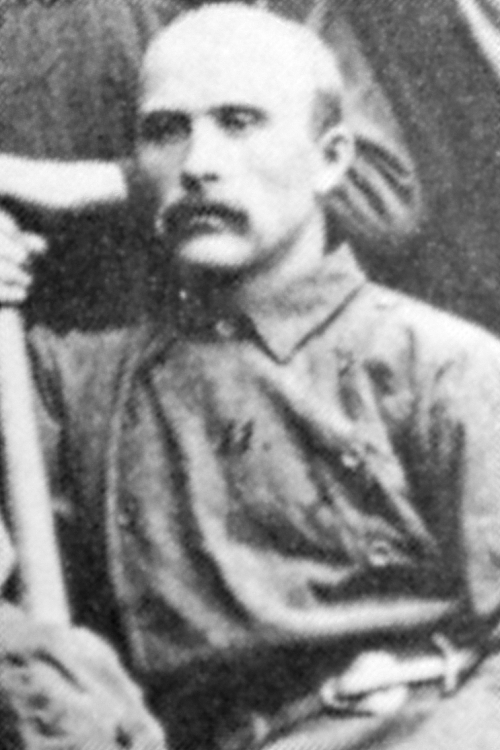
- Willigrod c. 1880
- Outfielder
- Born: October 27, 1857; Marshalltown, Iowa, US
- Died: November 27, 1906 (aged 49); San Francisco, California, US
- Batted: Left Threw: Unknown

MLB debut
- July 15, 1882, for the Detroit Wolverines

Last MLB appearance
- August 19, 1882, for the Cleveland Blues

MLB statistics
- At bats: 39
- Batting average: .154
- Runs batted in: 3
- Stats at Baseball Reference

Teams
- Detroit Wolverines (1882); Cleveland Blues (1882)

Julius Willigrod (October 27, 1857 – November 27, 1906) was an American professional baseball player whose career ran from 1879 to 1882. He played Major League Baseball for the Cleveland Blues and Detroit Wolverines in 1882.

== Early years ==
Willigrod was born in Marshalltown, Iowa. His father, Edward Willigrod, was an immigrant from Hanover, Prussia who worked as a machinist. His mother, Catharine, was an immigrant from Bavaria. Willigrod had a twin sister, Julia.

== Professional baseball player ==
Willigrod played minor league baseball for the Omaha Green Stockings in the Northwestern League in 1879 and then traveled west to California where he played for two seasons with the San Francisco Knickerbockers of the California League. During one of his two seasons with San Francisco, he led the league in runs scored despite compiling a batting average of only .207.

Between July 15 and August 19, 1882, Willigrod played ten games in Major League Baseball, principally as an outfielder, for the Detroit Wolverines and Cleveland Blues of the National League. He compiled a .154 batting average in 39 at bats. In his final major league game, he hit a triple and scored four runs, a record that still stands for the most runs scored in a player's final major league game.

== Later years ==
Willigrod died in 1906 at age 49 in San Francisco, California. He was buried in the Riverside Cemetery in Marshalltown, Iowa.
