= Hick Carpenter =

American baseball player (1855–1937)

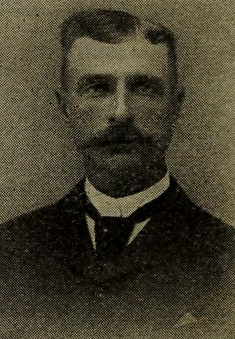
- Carpenter shown in the 1915 Spalding Guide
- Third baseman
- Born: August 16, 1855; Grafton, Massachusetts, U.S.
- Died: April 18, 1937 (aged 81); San Diego, California, U.S.
- Batted: Right Threw: Left

MLB debut
- May 1, 1879, for the Syracuse Stars

Last MLB appearance
- July 31, 1892, for the St. Louis Browns

MLB statistics
- Batting average: .259
- Hits: 1,202
- Runs: 720
- Stats at Baseball Reference

Teams
- Syracuse Stars (1879); Cincinnati Stars (1880); Worcester Worcesters (1881); Cincinnati Red Stockings (1882–1889); St. Louis Browns (1892)

Career highlights and awards
- American Association pennant (1882); AA runs batted in leader (1882)

Warren William "Hick" Carpenter (August 16, 1855 – April 18, 1937) was an American third baseman who played with several major league teams from 1879 to 1892.

== Career ==
Carpenter was born in Grafton, Massachusetts, in 1855. He started his professional baseball career in 1877 and made his MLB debut in the National League in 1879.

In the winter of 1879–1880, Carpenter and Jimmy Macullar became the first North Americans to play in the Cuban League. They were signed by the Colón club and were so powerful that other teams refused to play against them.

Carpenter played in the NL in 1880 and 1881. He then joined the American Association's Cincinnati Red Stockings and spent the rest of the decade on that team.

In 1882, Carpenter led the AA with 120 hits and 67 runs batted in. On September 12, 1883, he collected six hits in a game, as Cincinnati beat the Pittsburgh Alleghenys 27–5 while collecting a club-record 33 hits. On July 1, 1884, he had 5 hits, including 2 home runs and 2 doubles to lead the Red Stockings to a 16–5 win over the Washington Nationals.

Carpenter left Cincinnati and played mostly in the minor leagues from 1890 to 1892. He played one MLB game in 1892, which was his last season in professional baseball.

In Carpenter's old age, he renewed his friendship with the legendary Reds player Bid McPhee. They often fished together and attended San Diego Padres games in the Pacific Coast League.

Carpenter died in San Diego, California, in 1937. He is interred at Mount Hope Cemetery. A grave marker was provided in 2022 by SABR.

== See also ==
- List of Major League Baseball annual runs batted in leaders
- List of Major League Baseball single-game hits leaders
