= Garnet Bush =

American baseball umpire (1882–1919)

- Born: Garnet Cooper Bush; August 28, 1882; Kansas, U.S.
- Died: December 30, 1919 (aged 37); St. Louis, Missouri, U.S.
- Resting place: Valhalla Cemetery, St. Louis, Missouri
- Occupation: Umpire
- Years active: 1911-1912 (NL), 1914 (FL)
- Employer(s): National League, Federal League

Garnet Cooper Bush (August 28, 1882 – December 30, 1919) was an American professional baseball umpire.

Bush umpired 100 National League games from 1911 to 1912. He then umpired in the Federal League in 1914.
