= Riverside Park (stadium) =

Former baseball ground in Buffalo, New York

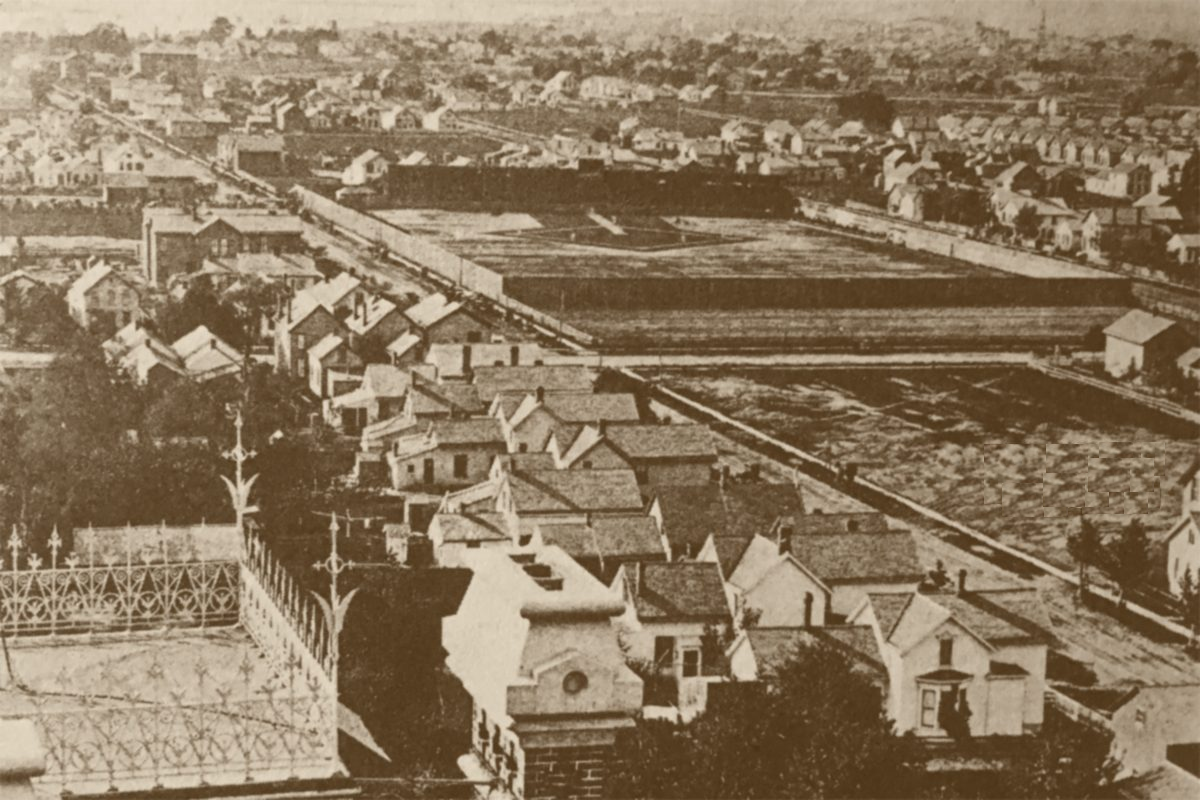
- Riverside Park
- Interactive map of Riverside Park
- Location: Buffalo, New York, United States
- Coordinates: 42°54′24″N 78°53′34″W
- Capacity: 3,000 to 5,000
- Surface: Grass

Construction
- Opened: 1878; 148 years ago
- Demolished: 1884; 142 years ago

Tenant
- Buffalo Bisons (NL) (1879–1883)

Riverside Park was a baseball ground located in Buffalo, New York, United States. The ground was home to the Buffalo Bisons baseball club of the International Association in 1878, and the National League from 1879 through 1883.

Although first used in 1878, its name as known to historians first surfaced in 1882. Despite its name, the ballpark was located a few blocks away from the Niagara River, leading a local newspaper to remark: "The Directors have dubbed the ballgrounds 'Riverside Park.' The name is not appropriate, but it will do." The stadium was located on a block bounded by Fargo Avenue, Rhode Island Street, West Avenue, and Vermont Street.

Riverside Park was the first ballpark to be used by the major league Bisons. The stadium was demolished at the request of its owner, Alexander Culbert, who wanted to redevelop the property. The Bisons moved to Olympic Park for the 1884 season and beyond. The rectangular block is today part of the residential neighborhood of Prospect Hill.

Preceded by None	Home of the Buffalo Bisons; 1878–1883	Succeeded by Olympic Park
