= Dasher Troy =

American baseball player (1856–1938)

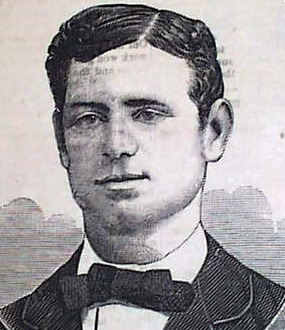
- Second baseman
- Born: May 8, 1856; New York City, New York, U.S.
- Died: March 30, 1938 (aged 81); South Ozone Park, New York, U.S.
- Batted: Right Threw: Right

MLB debut
- August 23, 1881, for the Detroit Wolverines

Last MLB appearance
- July 9, 1885, for the New York Metropolitans

MLB statistics
- Batting average: .243
- Runs: 166
- Runs batted in: 51
- Stats at Baseball Reference

Teams
- Detroit Wolverines (1881–1882); Providence Grays (1882); New York Gothams (1883); New York Metropolitans (1884–1885)

John Joseph "Dasher" Troy (May 8, 1856 – March 30, 1938) was an American professional baseball player from 1877 to 1888. He played five seasons of Major League Baseball, principally as a second baseman, for the Detroit Wolverines (1881–82), Providence Grays (1882), New York Gothams (1883), and the New York Metropolitans (1884-85). He appeared in 292 major league games, 257 of them as a second baseman, and compiled a .243 batting average with 42 doubles, 20 triples, four home runs and 51 runs batted in.

After retiring from baseball, Troy operated the beer concession at the Polo Grounds in the 1890s and later opened a café in his old home neighborhood at Tenth Avenue and 39th Street in Manhattan.

== Early years ==
Troy was born in New York City in 1856. He was raised in the Tenth Avenue Gashouse District on the Lower West Side of Manhattan.

== Professional baseball career ==
=== Minor leagues ===
Troy began his professional baseball career in 1877 with the New York Alaskas team in the League Alliance. He also played for three different clubs in the Eastern Championship Association during the 1881 season.

=== Detroit and Providence ===
In August 1881, Troy made his major league debut with the Detroit Wolverines of the National League. He appeared in 11 games at second and third base for the 1881 Wolverines and compiled a .341 batting average.

Troy returned to the Wolverines at the start of the 1882 season and appeared in 42 games, mostly at shortstop and second base. His batting average dropped to .243 with the 1882 Wolverines. He finished the 1882 season playing in four games for the Providence Grays of the National League.

=== New York ===
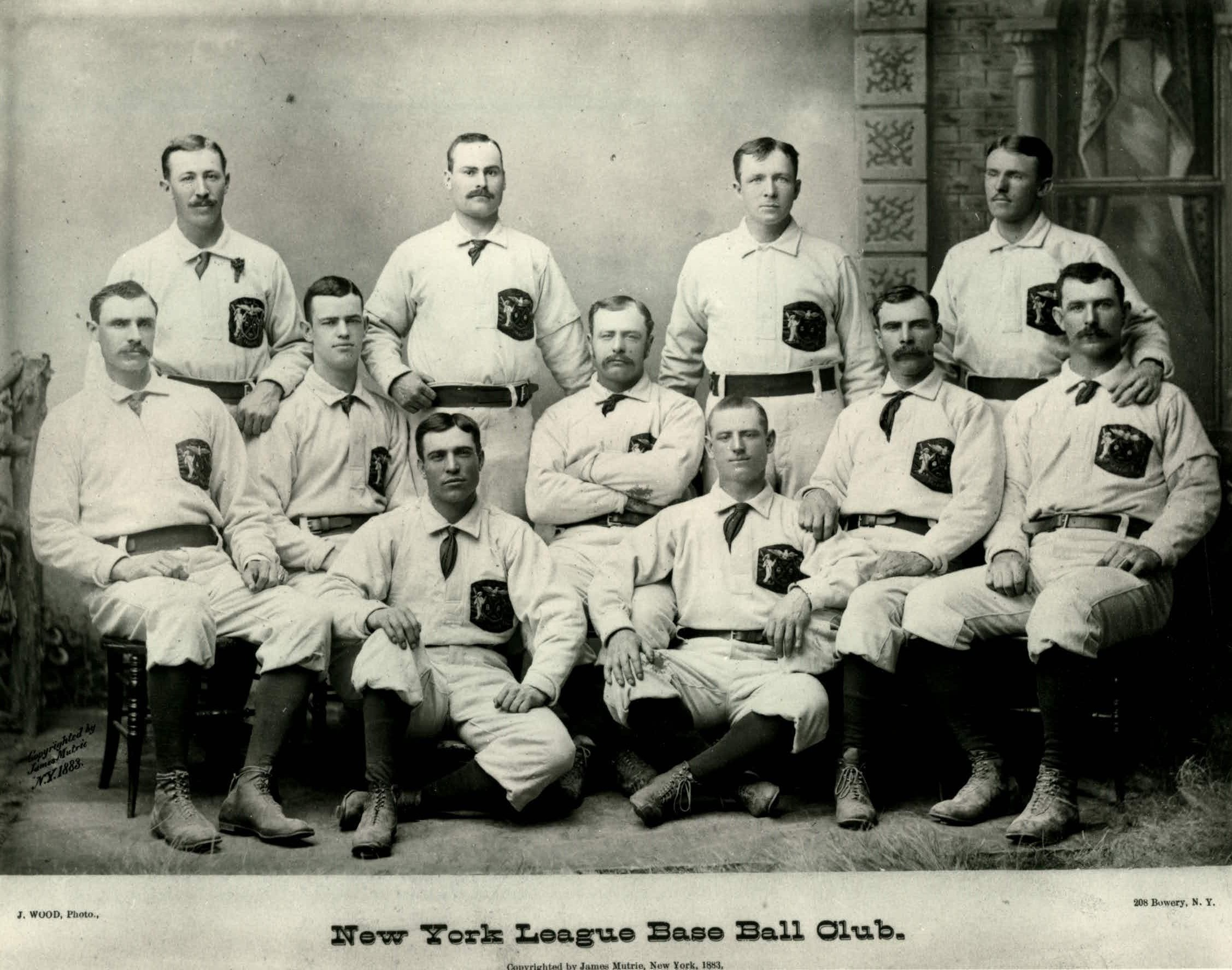
Troy (front row, right) with the 1883 New York Gothams

In 1883, Troy returned home to New York as a member of the newly formed New York Gothams, later renamed the Giants. Troy appeared in 85 games for the 1883 Gothams, including 73 games at second base and 12 at shortstop. He compiled a .215 batting average with seven doubles, five triples and 20 RBIs with the Gothams.

In 1884, Troy joined the New York Metropolitans of the American Association. The 1884 Metropolitans compiled a 75–32 record and won the American Association pennant. Troy was the team's starting second baseman, appearing in 104 games at the position in 1884. During New York's first championship season, Troy posted a .264 average with 80 runs scored, 111 hits, 22 doubles, 10 triples, and two home runs.

Troy concluded his major league career as a member of the 1885 Metropolitans. He appeared in 45 games that year, including 42 at second base. His batting average dipped to .220 with three doubles, three triples, two home runs and 12 RBIs. Troy's last major league game was on July 9, 1885.

=== Return to minors ===
Troy continued playing professional baseball in the minor leagues through the 1888 season, including stints with the Scranton Indians (39 games, 1886), Binghamton Crickets (36 games, 1886), New Haven Blues (55 games, 1887), Manchester Farmers (37 games, 1887), and Troy Trojans (62 games, 1888).

Troy was managed in 1888 by Ted Sullivan, who frowned on Troy's consumption of alcoholic beverages. Troy agreed voluntarily to abstain from drinking as a condition for playing on the manager's team, but was unhappy with the restriction. Finally, in a home game during the 1888 season, Troy promised that, if Sullivan went to the bar under the grandstand and brought him a beer, Troy would "clear the bases." Sullivan complied, and Troy walked to the plate saying, "The 'Old Dash' is back." Troy hit the ball off the center field fence for an inside-the-park home run to win the game. Sullivan later recalled, "After that I never stopped my old friend, John Troy, from taking his glass of beer." Sullivan further recalled that no player impressed him more than Troy for the "natural way he picked up ground balls", as "a man of principle", and for his "originality, good humor and clean language in the style of coaching."

== Later years ==
As a New York native who played for the Gothams/Giants in their first season in New York, Troy was fondly remembered by New Yorkers. From approximately 1889 to 1900, and with the exception of the 1894 season when he lost his license after an attack on a grandstand gatekeeper, Troy operated the beer concession, sometimes referenced as a saloon or bar, at the Polo Grounds in New York. According to one account published in 1893, patrons sometimes "paid more attention to 'Dasher' Troy's emporium than they did to the game." In September 1900, he opened a café in his old home neighborhood at Tenth Avenue and Thirty-Ninth Street.

Troy was married to Mary E. Flanagan in approximately 1890. By 1900, Troy was living with Mary in Manhattan and was employed as a liquor dealer. At that time, they had four children living with them: William (born July 1884), Margaret (born September 1888), Annie (born October 1889), and John Jr. (born November 1891). Ten years later, Troy was still living in Manhattan, was employed as a bartender and shared the household with wife Mary, daughters, Margaret and Anne, and son, John J. Troy, Jr. In 1920, Troy was still living in Manhattan with his wife, Mary, and son, John, Jr., in Manhattan. By 1930, Troy and his wife had retired and moved to Queens, New York.

Troy died in 1938 after a long illness at age 81 at his home in the South Ozone Park neighborhood of Queens, New York. He was buried at the Calvary Cemetery in Woodside, Queens, New York.
