= Curry Foley =

American baseball player (1856–1898)

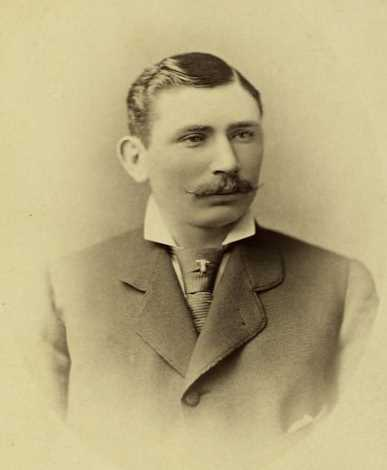
- Outfielder / Pitcher / First baseman
- Born: January 14, 1856; Milltown, County Kerry, Ireland
- Died: October 20, 1898 (aged 42); Boston, Massachusetts, U.S.
- Batted: Left Threw: Left

MLB debut
- May 13, 1879, for the Boston Red Caps

Last MLB appearance
- September 5, 1883, for the Buffalo Bisons

MLB statistics
- Batting average: .286
- Home runs: 6
- Runs batted in: 128
- Win–loss record: 27–27
- Earned run average: 3.54
- Strikeouts: 127
- Stats at Baseball Reference

Teams
- Boston Red Caps (1879–1880); Buffalo Bisons (1881–1883)

Career highlights and awards
- First major league player to hit for the cycle

Charles Joseph "Curry" Foley (January 16, 1856 – October 20, 1898) was an American professional baseball player who played in the National League (NL) for five seasons from 1879 to 1883. He played as a pitcher, outfielder and first baseman for two teams in the NL: the Boston Red Caps (1879–80) and the Buffalo Bisons (1881–83).

== Early life ==
Foley was born Milltown, County Kerry, to Charles Foley (a farmer) and Betsy Gearin. His family emigrated to the United States, arriving in New York City on June 27, 1863.

== Baseball career ==
Foley played in 337 games; 204 in the outfield, 69 as a pitcher, and 54 at first base. He compiled six home runs, 128 RBIs, and a .286 batting average as a batter, and posted a 27–27 win–loss record, 127 strikeouts and a 3.54 ERA as a pitcher in 442 innings pitched.

=== First major league cycle ===
On May 25, 1882, Foley became the first major league player to officially hit for the cycle. In a game against the Cleveland Blues, Foley hit a home run in the first inning, a triple in the second inning, a single in the third inning and a double in the fifth inning.

== Post-baseball life ==
On October 23, 1883, Foley became a naturalized citizen of the United States. Foley was working as a laborer, and listed as single when he died in 1898 at the age of 42 in Boston, Massachusetts. His cause of death was cirrhosis of the liver, and he is interred at Mount Cavalry Cemetery in Roslindale, Massachusetts.

== See also ==
- List of Major League Baseball players to hit for the cycle
- List of players from Ireland in Major League Baseball

Achievements
Preceded by none	Hitting for the cycle May 25, 1882	Succeeded by Lon Knight
