= Larry Corcoran =

American baseball player (1859–1891)

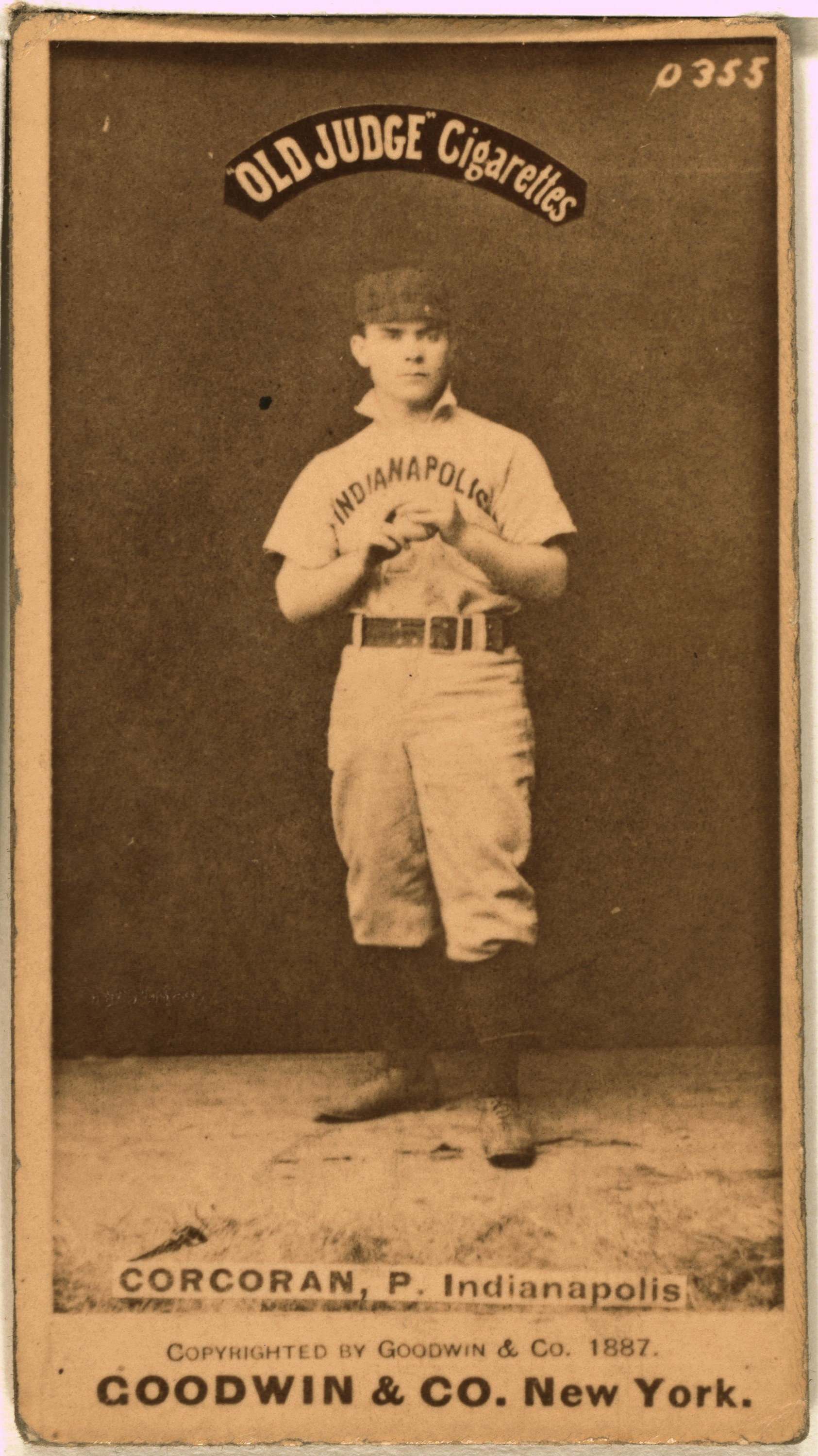
- Pitcher
- Born: August 10, 1859; Brooklyn, New York, U.S.
- Died: October 14, 1891 (aged 32); Newark, New Jersey, U.S.
- Batted: Switch Threw: Right

MLB debut
- May 1, 1880, for the Chicago White Stockings

Last MLB appearance
- May 20, 1887, for the Indianapolis Hoosiers

MLB statistics
- Win–loss record: 177–89
- Earned run average: 2.36
- Strikeouts: 1,103
- Stats at Baseball Reference

Teams
- Chicago White Stockings (1880–1885); New York Giants (1885–1886); Washington Senators (1886); Indianapolis Hoosiers (1887)

Career highlights and awards
- NL wins leader (1881); NL ERA leader (1882); NL strikeout leader (1880); Pitched three no-hitters (1880, 1882, 1884)

Lawrence J. Corcoran (August 10, 1859 – October 14, 1891) was an American professional baseball player. He pitched for four different major-league teams from 1880 to 1887.

== Biography ==
Corcoran was born in Brooklyn, New York. He made his major-league debut in the 1880 season; he won 43 games and led the Chicago White Stockings (today's Chicago Cubs) to the National League championship. Cap Anson alternated him with pitcher Fred Goldsmith, giving Chicago the first true pitching rotation in professional baseball.

In 1882, Corcoran became the first pitcher to throw two no-hitters in a career. Two seasons later, he became the first pitcher to throw three no-hitters, setting a record that stood until 1965, when Sandy Koufax threw his fourth no-hitter.

Corcoran is credited with creating the first method of signaling pitches to his catcher, which consisted of moving a wad of chewing tobacco in his mouth to indicate what pitch would be thrown. White Stockings catcher Silver Flint, who caught bare-handed, credited Corcoran with being the toughest pitcher to catch and being responsible for several of his misshapen fingers.

Naturally right-handed, Corcoran pitched four innings alternating throwing arms on June 16, 1884, due to the inflammation of his right index finger, making him a rare example of a switch pitcher.

Corcoran had a "dead arm" by 1885, and by 1887 he was out of the league.

Afflicted with Bright's disease, Corcoran died in Newark, New Jersey, at the age of 32. He was interred in the Holy Sepulchre Cemetery in East Orange. His brother, Mike Corcoran, pitched in one major-league game, in 1884.

== See also ==
- List of Major League Baseball annual ERA leaders
- List of Major League Baseball annual strikeout leaders
- List of Major League Baseball annual wins leaders
- List of Major League Baseball no-hitters

Preceded by John Montgomery Ward; Guy Hecker; Frank Mountain	No-hitter pitcher August 19, 1880; September 20, 1882; June 27, 1884	Succeeded by Pud Galvin; Charles Radbourn; Pud Galvin
