= Worcester Agricultural Fairgrounds =

Fairgrounds and baseball venue in Worcester, Massachusetts

- Agricultural County Fair Grounds; Worcester Driving Park
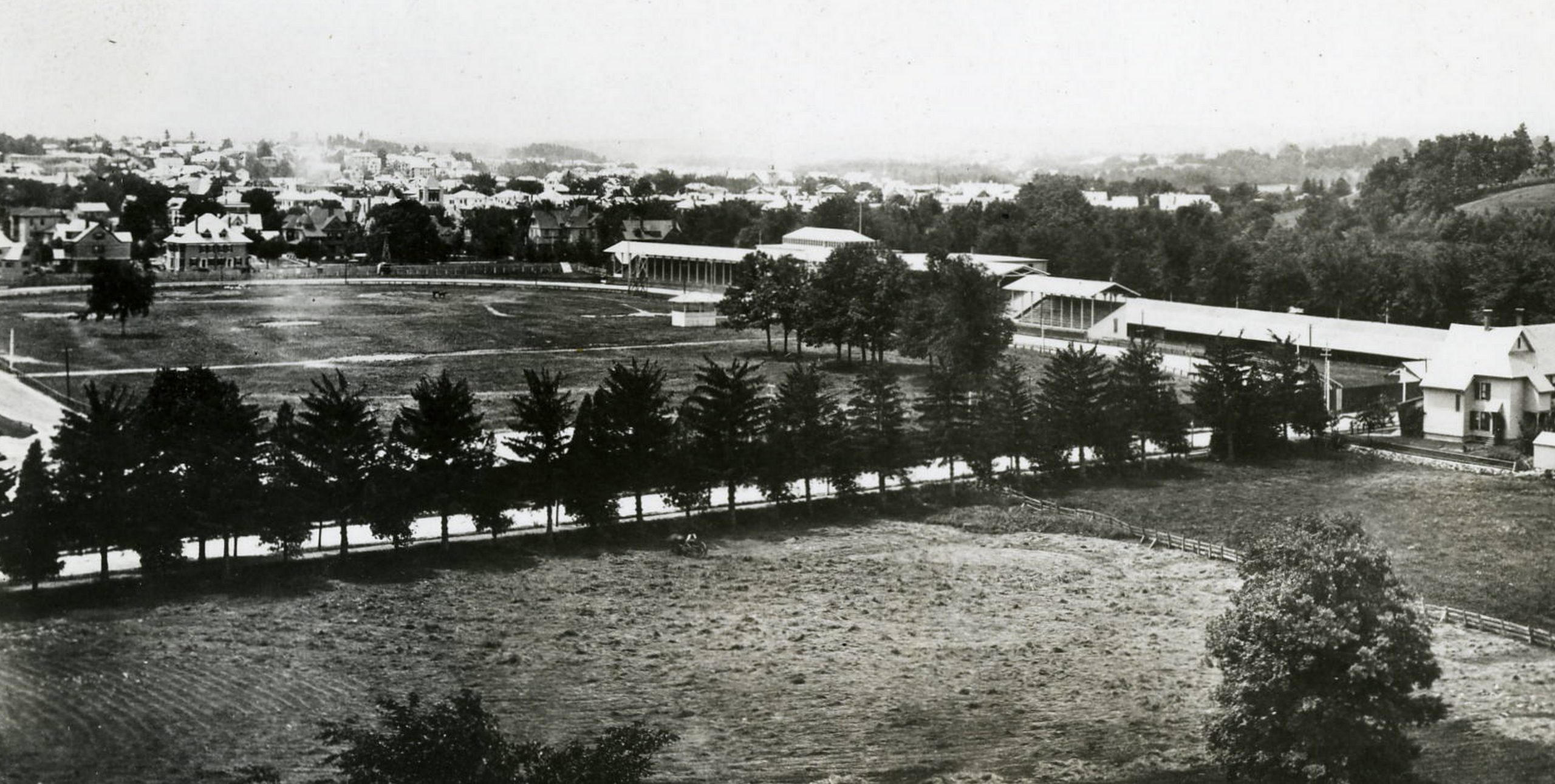
- Interactive map of Worcester Agricultural Fairgrounds
- Location: Worcester, Massachusetts, U.S.
- Coordinates: 42°16′08″N 71°48′47″W
- Surface: Natural grass

Construction
- Opened: May 1872 (for horse racing); May 1, 1880 (first NL game)
- Closed: September 29, 1882 (last NL game); July 1894 (for horse racing)

Tenant
- Worcester Worcesters (NL) (1880–1882)

Worcester Agricultural Fairgrounds was a 20-acre (8.1 ha) site in Worcester, Massachusetts, in the 19th century. The grounds are mainly known for having hosted the Worcester Worcesters, a professional baseball team of the National League from 1880 to 1882. As a major-league ballpark, the site is usually referred to as Agricultural County Fair Grounds or Worcester Driving Park.

== Location ==
The site was bounded by Highland Street (north), Sever Street (east), Cedar Street (south), and Agricultural (later Russell) Street (west). The grounds were just east of the large public park called Elm Park. Today, the former fairgrounds property contains a grid of streets, and many homes and businesses, including the now closed Becker College.

== History ==
The Fairgrounds were home to an agricultural fair and to a horse trotting track, usually called the Driving Park. "Driving" was a commonly used synonym for trotting, long before the term came to be associated primarily with the not-yet-invented automobile. The Driving Park opened in May 1872, and hosted baseball by August of that year. Horse racing at the grounds took place as late as July 1894, but appears to have ceased after that time due to local officials disallowing "pool-selling" (gambling) on races.

=== Professional baseball ===
Driving Park hosted some professional baseball games prior to Worcester acquiring its own franchise. These included an exhibition between the National Association (NA) pennant winner Boston Red Stockings and runner-up Philadelphia Whites, played on October 30, 1873, after the end of the season—Boston prevailed, 15–9, before a crowd of 2,000. A regular-season NA contest was held at Driving Park on October 30, 1874, between Boston and the Hartford Dark Blues. Hartford won, 17–11, in front of a crowd of 500.

The Worcester Worcesters competed in 1879 in a later National Association (unrelated to the earlier NA), then for three seasons, 1880 to 1882, in the major-league National League (NL). On June 12, 1880, Worcester pitcher Lee Richmond threw the first perfect game in major-league history. There is a granite post commemorating the perfect game on the former Becker College campus. The park was also the site of the first, true major league doubleheader. For the price of a single game, Worcester fans saw two games against the Providence Grays on September 25, 1882.

The last game for the local major-league club was played on September 29, 1882, with Troy defeating Worcester, 10–7. But it was not the last major-league game in Worcester; five years later, on August 17, 1887, the fairgrounds hosted an NL game between Washington and Boston. The contest—to make up a previously postponed game in the District of Columbia—was played in Worcester at the recommendation of Washington manager John Gaffney, who had grown up in Worcester. Boston won, 6–5.

Preceded by Franchise established	Home of the Worcester Worcesters; 1880–1882	Succeeded by Franchise disbanded
