= Buffalo Bisons (National League) =

Former Major League Baseball team in Buffalo, New York

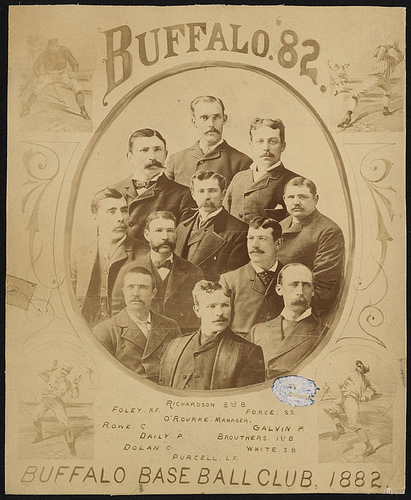
- Logo A program cover featuring the 1882 Buffalo Bisons

Information
- League: National League
- Location: Buffalo, New York
- Ballpark: Olympic Park (1884–1885)
- Founded: 1879
- Folded: 1885 (continued as a minor league team)
- Former ballpark: Riverside Park (1879–1883)
- Colors: Gold, black
- Manager: List of managers: Pud Galvin & Jack Chapman (1885); Jim O'Rourke (1881–1884); Sam Crane (1880); John Clapp (1879)

The original Buffalo Bisons baseball club played in the National League between 1879 and 1885. The Bisons played their games at Riverside Park (1879–1883) and Olympic Park (1884–1885) in Buffalo, New York. In 1886, they moved into minor league baseball as members of the original International League.

The original IL Bisons would leave in 1971 to Winnipeg, Manitoba, Canada, as the Winnipeg Whips, before eventually landing in Scranton, Pennsylvania (after an additional five moves). The franchise currently plays in Moosic, Pennsylvania, as the Scranton/Wilkes-Barre RailRiders. The current Buffalo Bisons, founded in 1979, include the history of the NL Bisons; it is thus the only NL team from the 19th century that both still exists and no longer plays in Major League Baseball.

== Year-by-year records ==
| Season | Manager | Games | W | L | T | WP | PL | GB |
| 1879 | John Clapp | 79 | 46 | 32 | 1 | .590 | 3rd | 10.0 |
| 1880 | Sam Crane | 85 | 24 | 58 | 3 | .293 | 7th | 42.0 |
| 1881 | Jim O'Rourke | 83 | 45 | 38 | 0 | .542 | 3rd | 10.5 |
| 1882 | Jim O'Rourke | 84 | 45 | 39 | 0 | .536 | 3rd | 10.0 |
| 1883 | Jim O'Rourke | 98 | 52 | 45 | 1 | .536 | 5th | 10.5 |
| 1884 | Jim O'Rourke | 115 | 64 | 47 | 4 | .577 | 3rd | 19.5 |
| 1885 | Pud Galvin / Jack Chapman | 113 | 38 | 74 | 1 | .339 | 7th | 49.0 |

== Players of note ==
- Dan Brouthers
- Bill Crowley
- Davy Force
- Pud Galvin
- Charley Radbourn
- Jim O'Rourke
- Hardy Richardson
- Jack Rowe
- Deacon White

Brouthers, Galvin, O'Rourke, Radbourn, and White are members of the Baseball Hall of Fame.

== Highlights and memorable moments ==
- 1877: A precursor to the Bisons played in the League Alliance, finishing with a 79–28–3 record. The team subsequently joined the National League.
- 1880: Future Hall of Fame pitcher Charlie Radbourn debuted as a second baseman on May 5
- 1880: Pud Galvin pitched a no-hitter against the Worcester Worcesters on August 20
- 1881: 2B Davy Force recorded 12 putouts, seven assists, two unassisted double plays, participated in a triple play, and made just one error in 20 chances in a 12-inning game against Worcester, on September 15.
- 1882: Ireland-born Curry Foley became the first major league player ever to hit for the cycle (including a grand slam), on May 25, and Dan Brouthers led the National League with a .368 batting average
- 1883: Brouthers won his second consecutive NL batting title with a .374 average and Galvin posted 46 wins
- 1884: Brouthers hit triples in four consecutive games, set a season team-record with 14 home runs, and Galvin won 46 games for the second year in a row. Galvin threw another no-hitter, on August 4. The Bisons' 18–0 score remains the greatest margin of victory in a no-hitter in Major League history. Two years after Foley, Jim O'Rourke became the fourth player in MLB history to hit for the cycle, on June 16.
- 1885: Brouthers hit .359, ending second in the NL batting race behind Roger Connor (.371)

== National Baseball Hall of Fame members ==
| Name | Position | Inducted | Tenure |
| Charles Radbourn | P | 1939 | 1880 |
| Jim O'Rourke | OF | 1945 | 1881–1884 |
| Dan Brouthers | 1B | 1945 | 1881–1885 |
| Pud Galvin | P | 1965 | 1879–1885 |
| Deacon White | 3B/C | 2013 | 1881–1885 |

== See also ==
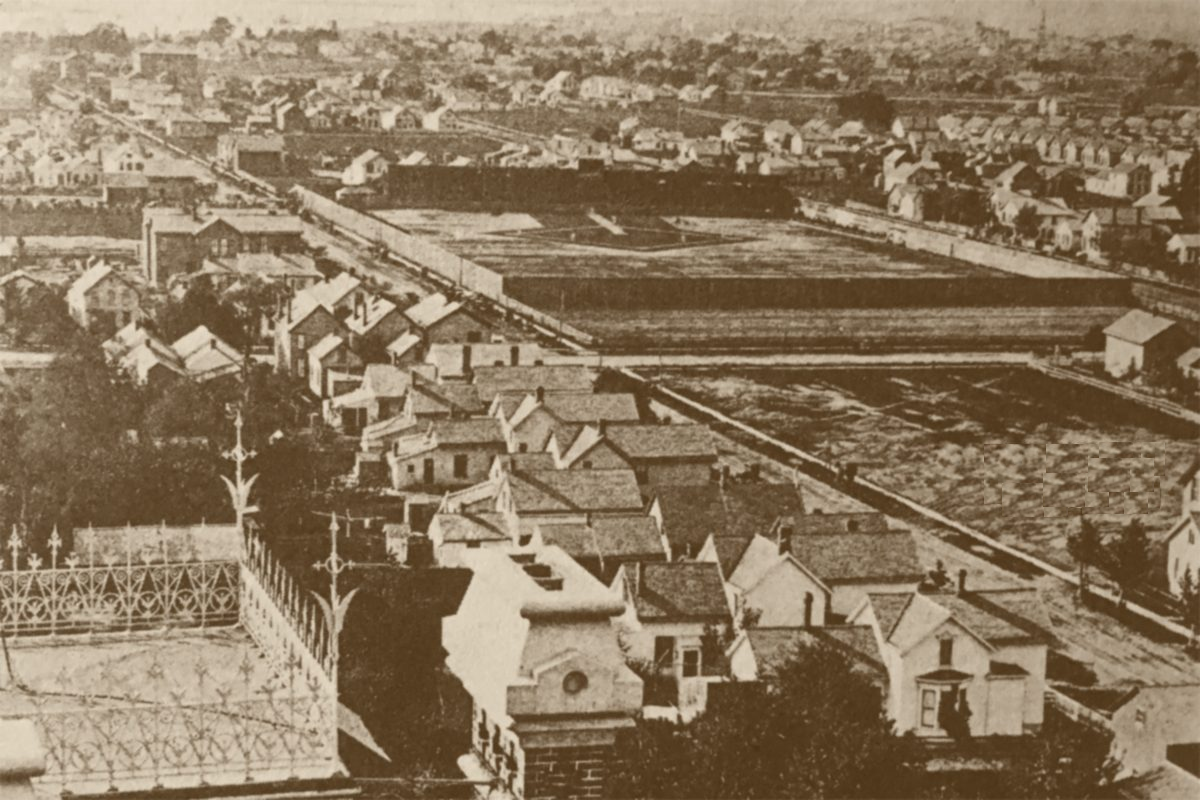
Riverside Park

- Buffalo Bisons all-time roster
- 1879 Buffalo Bisons season
- 1880 Buffalo Bisons season
- 1881 Buffalo Bisons season
- 1882 Buffalo Bisons season
- 1883 Buffalo Bisons season
- 1884 Buffalo Bisons season
- 1885 Buffalo Bisons season
- Buffalo Bisons (disambiguation)
- 19th century National League teams
