= Tom Cheney (baseball) =

American baseball player (1934–2001)

- Pitcher
- Born: October 14, 1934; Morgan, Georgia, U.S.
- Died: November 1, 2001 (aged 67); Rome, Georgia, U.S.
- Batted: Right Threw: Right

MLB debut
- April 21, 1957, for the St. Louis Cardinals

Last MLB appearance
- May 9, 1966, for the Washington Senators

MLB statistics
- Win–loss record: 19–29
- Earned run average: 3.77
- Strikeouts: 345
- Stats at Baseball Reference

Teams
- St. Louis Cardinals (1957, 1959); Pittsburgh Pirates (1960–1961); Washington Senators (1961–1964, 1966)

Career highlights and awards
- World Series champion (1960); Struck out a record 21 batters in a game on September 12, 1962

Thomas Edgar Cheney (October 14, 1934 – November 1, 2001) was an American Major League Baseball (MLB) player. Cheney, a right-handed pitcher from Morgan, Georgia, played for the St. Louis Cardinals, Pittsburgh Pirates, and Washington Senators in a span of eight seasons from 1957 to 1966.

Cheney is most notable for striking out the highest number of batters in a Major League Baseball game. He did so on September 12, 1962, when as a Senator, struck out 21 Baltimore Orioles in 16 innings en route to a 2–1 victory.

== Professional career ==
=== St. Louis Cardinals ===
Cheney was signed as an amateur free agent by the St. Louis Cardinals prior to the start of the 1952 baseball season. After spending a few years in the minor leagues, he was called up by the Cardinals in 1957, and made his Major League Baseball debut with the team on April 21, 1957. Cheney pitched in four games during the season, starting in three of them. He posted an 0–1 record with a 15.00 earned run average in 9 innings of work, giving up 6 hits, while walking 15 batters and striking out 10.

The following year, 1958, Cheney did not play in baseball, as he was serving in the United States military. Cheney returned to baseball for the 1959 season with the Cardinals, primarily serving as a relief pitcher in the 11 games he pitched during the season. Cheney again had issues with his control and accuracy. He walked 11 men in just 11 2/3 innings of work. He was 0–1 for the season, with a 6.92 ERA, along with giving up 17 hits and striking out 8 batters.

=== Pittsburgh Pirates ===
On December 21, 1959, in the midst of the off-season, Cheney was traded by the St. Louis Cardinals with his teammate, outfielder Gino Cimoli, to the Pittsburgh Pirates in exchange for relief pitcher Ron Kline.

The Pirates hoped to make Cheney the starting pitcher with control and accuracy that they could depend on. Cheney progressed as a pitcher that season, and put up improved stats that season, pitching a 2–2 record in eleven games (eight as starting pitcher) with a decent 3.98 earned run average. Cheney only gave up 44 hits while walking 33 men and striking out 35 in 52 innings of work. As a pitcher, Cheney improved remarkably in his transition from the Cardinals to the Pirates. The 1960 Pittsburgh Pirates team went on to the World Series after posting an impressive 95–59 record in the regular season. The Pirates defeated the New York Yankees four games to three games, winning the franchise's 3rd overall World Series, and first since 1925. The series was decided by a walk-off home run in the 9th inning of Game 7, when Bill Mazeroski took a 1–0 pitch and crushed it over the left-field fence, giving Pittsburgh the championship. Cheney served as a relief pitcher in the World Series and pitched four innings in three games (Game 2, 3, and 6), giving up four hits and two earned runs while only walking one batter and striking out six.

In 1961, Cheney started off with a terrible performance, giving up 4 earned runs and walking 4 batters in less than a third of an inning.

=== Washington Senators ===
Cheney was traded to the Washington Senators on June 29, 1961, in exchange for pitcher Tom Sturdivant. He served as both a starting pitcher and relief pitcher for the remainder of the season with the Washington Senators. He did not fare well, and he again showed signs of lack of control with his pitching. He posted a 1–3 record in 10 games, 7 of which he started. He put in 29 2/3 innings of work and gave up 32 hits and 29 earned runs. He walked 26 batters and struck out 20. His earned run average ballooned to 8.79, giving him an ERA of 10.00 for the 1961 season.

Nonetheless, Cheney was on the roster for the Washington Senators in 1962. Cheney pitched in 37 games in total, starting 25 of them. He pitched to a 7–9 record with four complete games and three shutouts and showed drastic improvement in all aspects of his pitching. He pitched stellarly in 173 1/3 innings, giving up only 134 hits while walking 97 and striking out 147. His ERA for the season was a career-best 3.17. Cheney finished second in the American League in both strikeouts per nine innings and hits allowed per nine innings. 1962 was perhaps Cheney's best remembered season. On September 12, 1962, Tom Cheney set the Major League Baseball record for strikeouts in a regular-season game. Cheney pitched brilliantly in 16 innings of work, giving up only one run while striking out a record 21 Baltimore Orioles. Cheney had 13 strikeouts through nine innings.

Senators manager Mickey Vernon later wanted to make a change, reportedly asking the pitcher: "Your arm okay? You sure you don't want me to take you out?", to which Cheney replied . .

I started this damn game, I'm finishing it.

"I told him I didn't want to come out", Cheney said. "Back in those days, you finished what you started." Cheney wound up pitching eight straight hitless innings near the end. With his 228th and final pitch, he slipped a called third strike past pinch-hitter Dick Williams, who went on to become a major league manager.

It was not until the bottom of the 16th inning that teammate Bud Zipfel hit the game-winning home run off Orioles pitcher Dick Hall giving the Senators a hard-fought 2–1 victory and Cheney a win and a major league record that still stands. Roger Clemens, Kerry Wood, and Max Scherzer came close to Cheney's record, but all three failed, each striking out 20 men in their respective 9-inning regulation games.

Teammate Don Lock says of his gifts:

He had an ungodly great arm, an ungodly good body and big hands. He could do anything with a baseball.

Six days after his great performance, on September 18, 1962, Cheney suffered a setback at D.C. Stadium. Cheney gave up two home runs to Mickey Mantle and lost the game 7–1 to Ralph Terry and the New York Yankees (who would go on to win the 1962 World Series).

Cheney again pitched skillfully in 1963, a season that is probably considered his best season during his 8-year major league career. Cheney only pitched half the season, but finished with career-bests in wins, complete games, shutouts, and ERA. Cheney pitched in a total of 23 games that season, serving as the starting pitcher in 21 of them. He posted an 8–9 record, a 2.71 ERA along with 7 complete games and 4 shutouts. Tom gave up just 99 hits in 136 1/3 innings of work and dominated batters by walking only 40 and striking out 97. However, in July 1963, Cheney suffered a devastating elbow injury that played a major role in prematurely ending his major league career just after he was starting to appear as one of the premier pitchers in the American League. Cheney played minimally with the Washington Senators in 1964 and 1966. He pitched in his last game on May 9, 1966.

His daughter Terri Cook says of his career:

"He was angry that he had such a great career one day and the next day it was gone. He pretty much blames that (record-breaking) game for the decline of this arm. When he pitched, he pitched hard."

== Career stats and death ==
In his career, Cheney started 71 games and came in for relief in 44 more. He finished with a 19–29 record, a 3.77 ERA, 13 complete games, 8 of which were shutouts. He picked up 2 saves, once in 1962 and again in 1964. Tom Cheney pitched in a total of 466 innings, giving up just 382 hits, while walking 245 and striking out 345.

Tom Cheney died at the age of 67 on November 1, 2001, in Rome, Georgia.

== See also ==
- List of pitchers who have struck out 18 or more batters in a nine-inning baseball game
- List of rare baseball events
