= List of Major League Baseball single-game strikeout leaders =

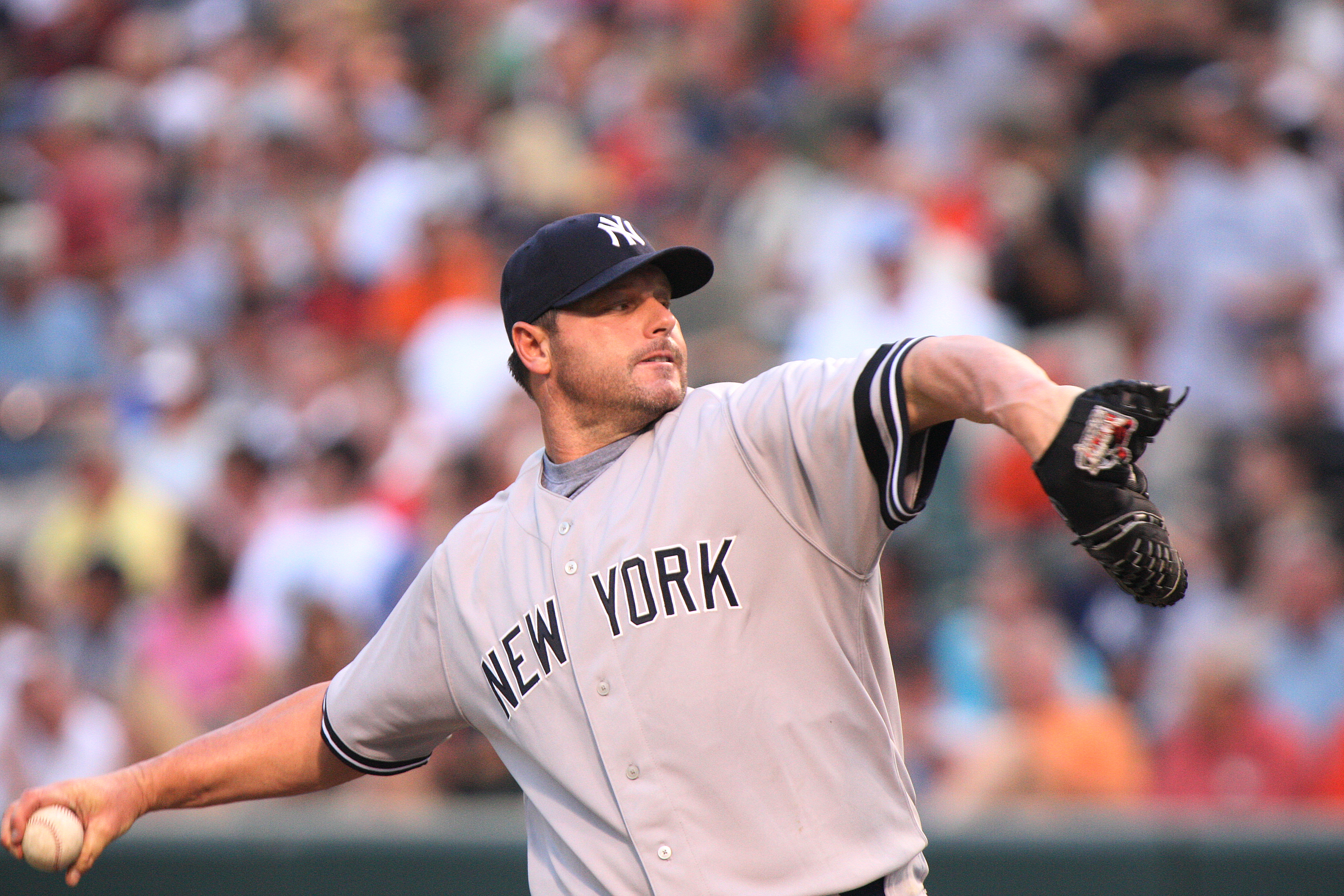
Roger Clemens

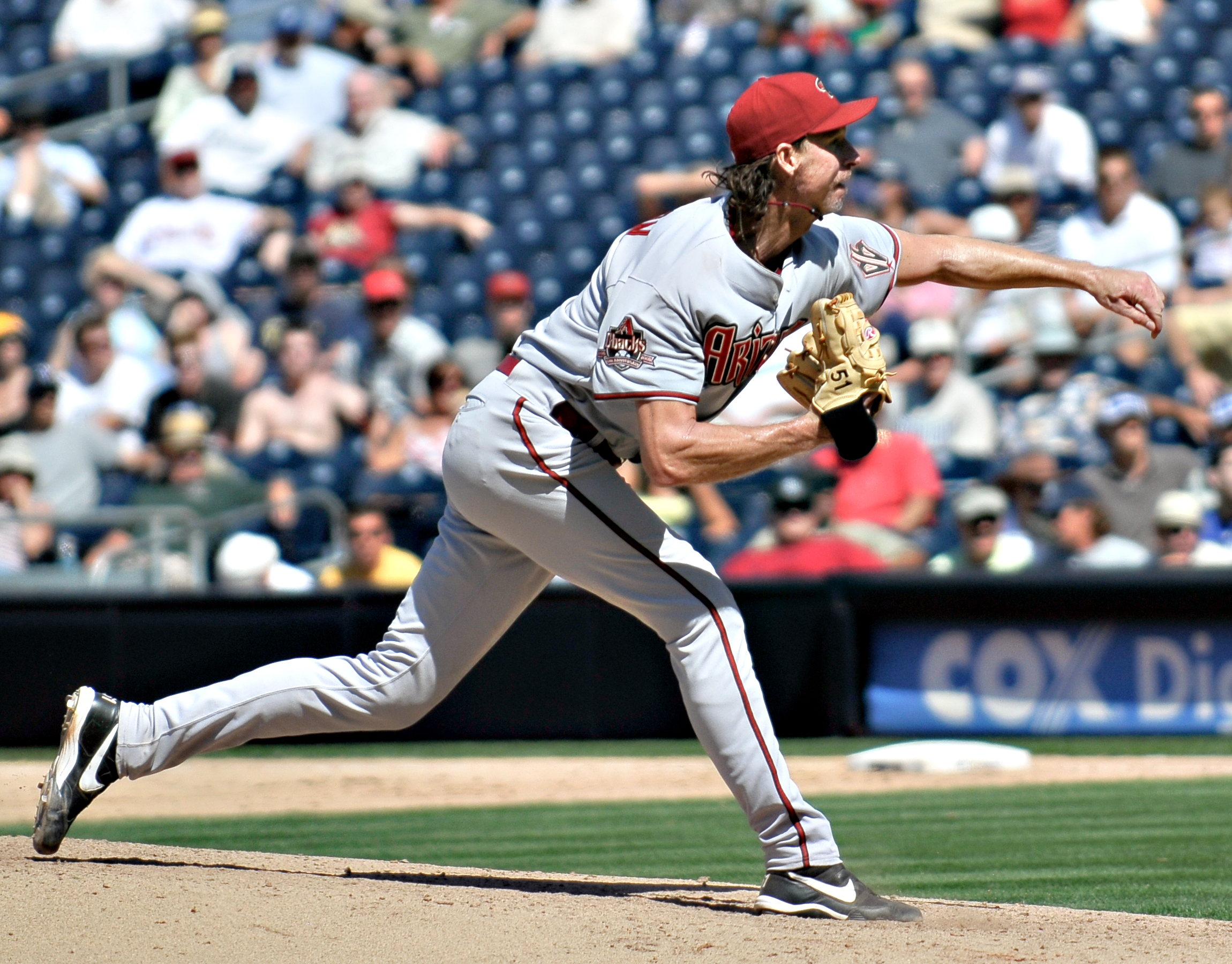
Randy Johnson

Clemens and Johnson are the only MLB pitchers to strike out 18 or more batters in a nine-inning game on three separate occasions.

In baseball, a strikeout occurs when a pitcher throws three strikes to a batter during his time at bat. Only three pitchers have struck out 20 batters in a nine-inning game: Roger Clemens (twice), Kerry Wood, and most recently Max Scherzer.

Twenty different pitchers have struck out at least 18 batters in a single nine-inning Major League Baseball (MLB) game, (Note: 18 strikeouts is utilized as the benchmark as that is normally two-thirds of a nine-inning game's 27 outs (while uncommon, a pitcher can record a strikeout that does not result in an out due to the uncaught third strike rule).) the most recent being Scherzer of the Washington Nationals on May 11, 2016. Four players have accomplished the feat more than once in their career; no player has ever struck out more than 20 batters in a nine-inning game. Charlie Sweeney was the first player to strike out 18 batters in a single game, doing so for the Providence Grays against the Boston Beaneaters on June 7, 1884. In spite of this, Bob Feller is viewed as the first pitcher to accomplish the feat, since his then-record 18 strikeouts was the first to occur during the 20th century and the live-ball era.

Out of the 20 pitchers who have accomplished the feat, 15 were right-handed and five pitched left-handed. Five of these players have played for only one major league team. Six pitchers—Steve Carlton, Roger Clemens, Randy Johnson, Nolan Ryan, Tom Seaver, and Max Scherzer—are also members of the 3,000 strikeout club. Sweeney has the fewest career strikeouts in the group with 505, while Nolan Ryan, with 5,714, struck out more batters than any other pitcher in major league history. Bill Gullickson and Kerry Wood are the only rookies to have achieved the feat. Tom Seaver concluded his milestone game by striking out the final ten batters he faced, setting a new major league record for most consecutive strikeouts.

Of the eleven players eligible for the Baseball Hall of Fame who have struck out 18 batters in a game, six have been elected; all six were elected on the first ballot. Players are eligible for the Hall of Fame if they have played in at least 10 major league seasons and have either been retired for five seasons or deceased for at least six months.

== Players ==
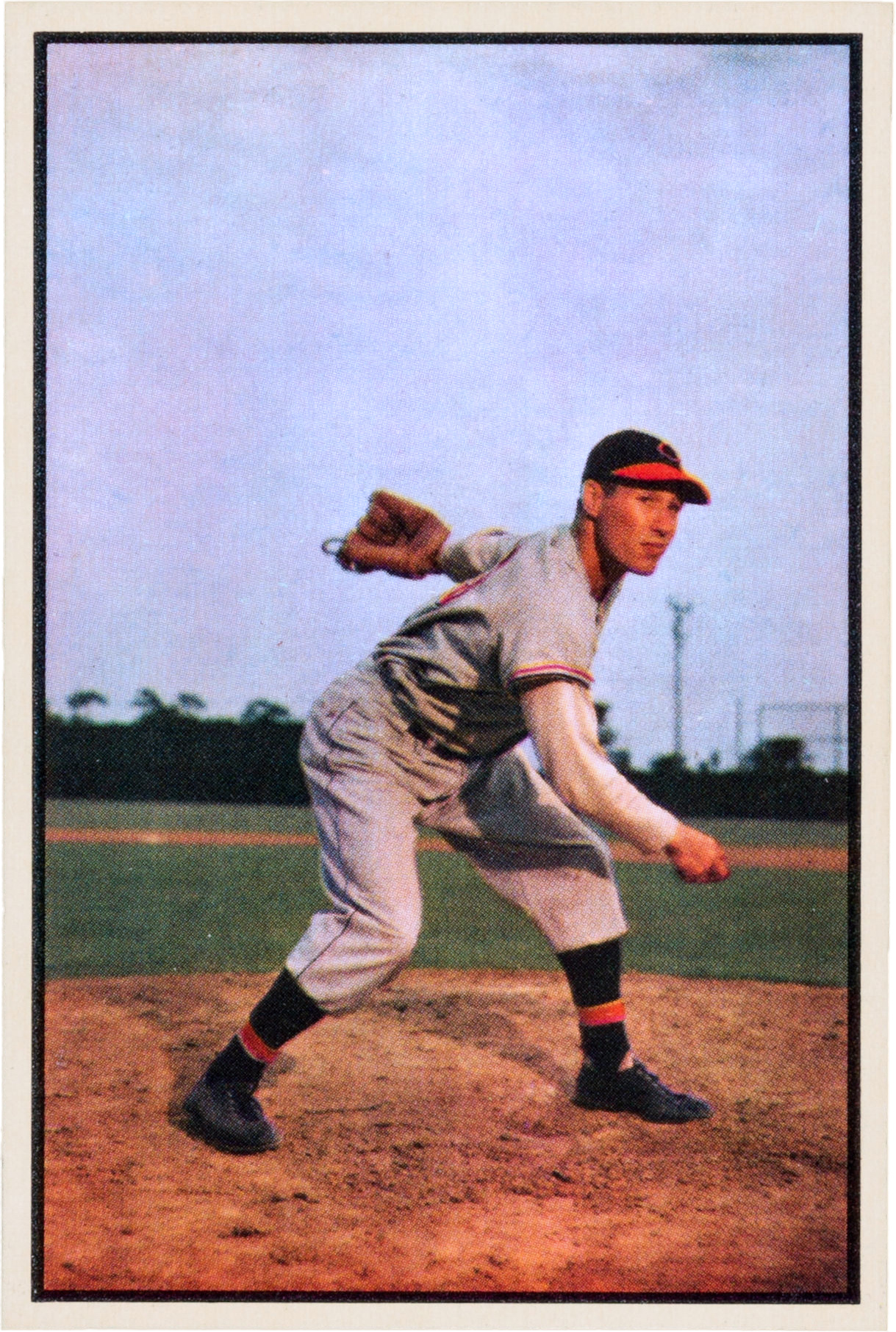
Bob Feller was the first player to achieve 18 strikeouts in a game during the 20th century.

Sandy Koufax was the first pitcher to achieve multiple games with 18 strikeouts, recording two in his career.

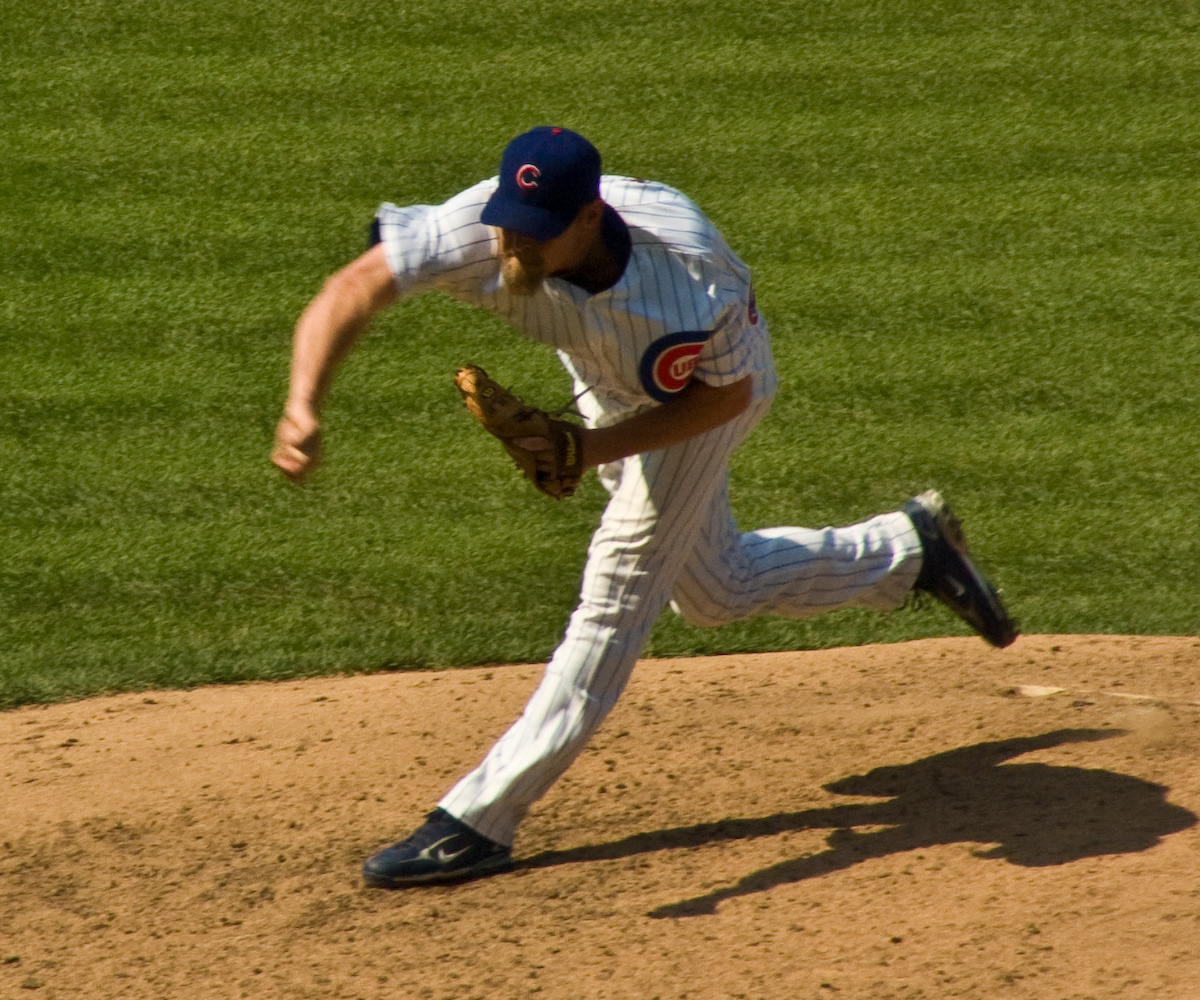
Kerry Wood tied Roger Clemens' major league record of 20 strikeouts in a nine-inning game on May 6, 1998.

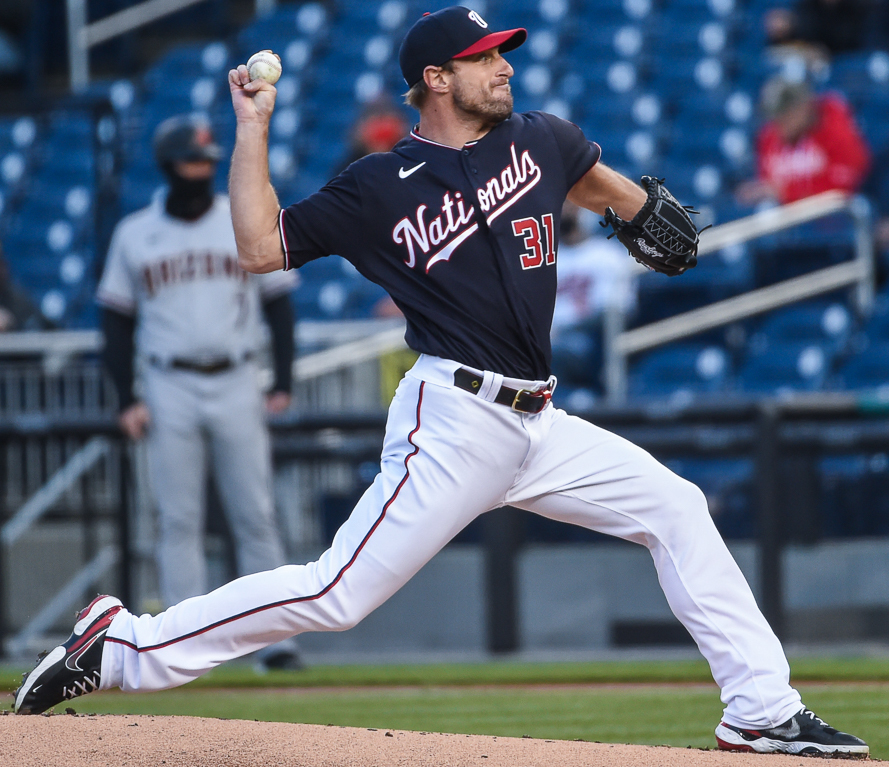
Max Scherzer tied Kerry Wood and Roger Clemens' major league record of 20 strikeouts in a nine-inning game in 2016.

Key
Pitcher	Name of the pitcher
Date	Date of the game
Team	The pitcher's team
Opposing team	The team against whom the pitcher struck out 18 players
Score	Final score of the game, with the pitcher's team score listed first
Strikeouts	Number of strikeouts the pitcher recorded
Career Ks	Career strikeouts
†	Elected to the Baseball Hall of Fame
*	Player is active
‡	Indicates the player's team lost the game

=== MLB pitchers with 18 strikeouts in a nine-inning game ===
MLB pitchers with 18 strikeouts in a nine-inning game (sorted by number of strikeouts, then chronologically)
Pitcher	Date	Team	Opposing team	Score	Strikeouts	Career Ks	Refs
Max Scherzer^{*}	May 11, 2016	Washington Nationals	Detroit Tigers	3–2	20	3,557	
Kerry Wood	May 6, 1998	Chicago Cubs	Houston Astros	2–0	20	1,582	
Roger Clemens	September 18, 1996	Boston Red Sox	Detroit Tigers	4–0	20	4,672	
Roger Clemens	April 29, 1986	Boston Red Sox	Seattle Mariners	3–1	20	4,672	
Randy Johnson^{†}	August 8, 1997	Seattle Mariners	Chicago White Sox	5–0	19	4,875	
Randy Johnson^{†}	June 24, 1997	Seattle Mariners	Oakland Athletics	1–4^{‡}	19	4,875	
David Cone	October 6, 1991	New York Mets	Philadelphia Phillies	7–0	19	2,668	
Nolan Ryan^{†}	August 12, 1974	California Angels	Boston Red Sox	4–2	19	5,714	
Tom Seaver^{†}	April 22, 1970	New York Mets	San Diego Padres	2–1	19	3,640	
Steve Carlton^{†}	September 15, 1969	St. Louis Cardinals	New York Mets	3–4^{‡}	19	4,136	
Hugh Daily	July 7, 1884	Chicago Browns	Boston Reds	10–4	19	846	
Charlie Sweeney	June 7, 1884	Providence Grays	Boston Beaneaters	2–1	19	505	
Corey Kluber	May 13, 2015	Cleveland Indians	St. Louis Cardinals	2–0	18	1,725	
Ben Sheets	May 16, 2004	Milwaukee Brewers	Atlanta Braves	4–1	18	1,325	
Roger Clemens	August 25, 1998	Toronto Blue Jays	Kansas City Royals	3–0	18	4,672	
Randy Johnson^{†}	September 27, 1992	Seattle Mariners	Texas Rangers	2–3^{‡}	18	4,875	
Ramón Martínez	June 4, 1990	Los Angeles Dodgers	Atlanta Braves	6–0	18	1,427	
Bill Gullickson	September 10, 1980	Montreal Expos	Chicago Cubs	4–2	18	1,279	
Ron Guidry	June 17, 1978	New York Yankees	California Angels	4–0	18	1,778	
Nolan Ryan^{†}	September 10, 1976	California Angels	Chicago White Sox	3–2	18	5,714	
Don Wilson	July 14, 1968	Houston Astros	Cincinnati Reds	6–1	18	1,283	
Sandy Koufax^{†}	April 24, 1962	Los Angeles Dodgers	Chicago Cubs	10–2	18	2,396	
Sandy Koufax^{†}	August 31, 1959	Los Angeles Dodgers	San Francisco Giants	5–2	18	2,396	
Bob Feller^{†}	October 2, 1938	Cleveland Indians	Detroit Tigers	1–4^{‡}	18	2,581	
Henry Porter	October 3, 1884	Milwaukee Brewers	Boston Reds	4–5^{‡}	18	659	
Dupee Shaw	July 19, 1884	Boston Reds	St. Louis Maroons	0–1^{‡}	18	950	

=== 18 strikeouts in extra-inning games ===
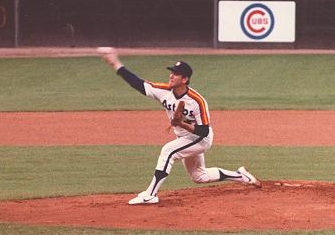
Nolan Ryan amassed 18 or more strikeouts in a nine-inning game twice, as well as 19 strikeouts in extra-inning games three times.

Eight different pitchers have struck out at least 18 batters in an extra-inning Major League Baseball (MLB) game to date. Only Nolan Ryan accomplished the feat more than once in his career and no player has ever struck out more than 21 batters in a game.

The following list is kept separate from the above list of pitchers who have struck out 18 or more batters in a nine-inning game. This is due to the differing number of innings pitched during an extra-inning game, the lack of a definitive endpoint to the game that would otherwise allow for a fair comparison to be made, and the advantage of having more opportunities to strike out players during an extra-inning game as opposed to one lasting nine innings.

Key
IP	Innings pitched by the pitcher in the game

MLB pitchers with 18 strikeouts in an extra-inning game
Pitcher	Date	Team	Opposing team	Score	Strikeouts	IP	Career Ks	Refs
Tom Cheney	September 12, 1962	Washington Senators	Baltimore Orioles	2–1	21	16	345	
Randy Johnson^{†}	May 8, 2001	Arizona Diamondbacks	Cincinnati Reds	4–3	20	9 (Note: Although the game went into extra innings (11 total), Johnson was relieved by Byung-hyun Kim after nine innings.)	4,875	
Luis Tiant	July 3, 1968	Cleveland Indians	Minnesota Twins	1–0	19	10	2,416	
Nolan Ryan^{†}	June 14, 1974	California Angels	Boston Red Sox	4–3	19	13	5,714	
Nolan Ryan^{†}	August 20, 1974	California Angels	Detroit Tigers	0–1^{‡}	19	11	5,714	
Nolan Ryan^{†}	June 8, 1977	California Angels	Toronto Blue Jays	2–1	19	10	5,714	
Jack Coombs	September 1, 1906	Philadelphia Athletics	Boston Americans	4-1	18	24	1,052	
Warren Spahn^{†}	June 14, 1952	Boston Braves	Chicago Cubs	1–3^{‡}	18	15	2,583	
Chris Short	October 2, 1965	Philadelphia Phillies	New York Mets	0–0	18	15	1,629	
Jim Maloney	June 14, 1965	Cincinnati Reds	New York Mets	0–1^{‡}	18	11	1,605	

== See also ==
- List of Major League Baseball no-hitters
- List of Major League Baseball pitchers who have thrown an immaculate inning
- List of Major League Baseball single-inning strikeout leaders
