= Charlie Sweeney =

American baseball player (1863–1902)

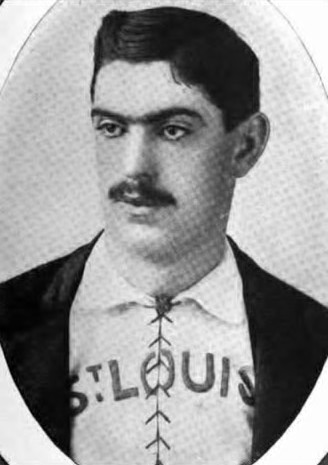
- Sweeney in 1884
- Pitcher / Outfielder
- Born: April 13, 1863; San Francisco, California, U.S.
- Died: April 4, 1902 (aged 38); San Francisco, California, U.S.
- Batted: Right Threw: Right

MLB debut
- May 11, 1882, for the Providence Grays

Last MLB appearance
- July 9, 1887, for the Cleveland Blues

MLB statistics
- Win–loss record: 64–52
- Earned run average: 2.87
- Strikeouts: 505
- Stats at Baseball Reference

Teams
- Providence Grays (1883–1884); St. Louis Maroons (1884–1886); Cleveland Blues (1887)

Charles Joseph Sweeney (April 13, 1863 – April 4, 1902) was an American Major League Baseball pitcher from 1883 through 1887. He played for the Providence Grays, St. Louis Maroons, and Cleveland Blues, and is best known for his performance in 1884, when he won 41 games.

== Early life ==
Sweeney was born to Irish immigrants Edward and Mary Sweeney in San Francisco, California. He started his professional career in 1881 with the San Francisco Athletics of the California League. Sweeney is often incorrectly listed as playing one game with the National League's Providence Grays in 1882; he did not join the team until 1883. That season, he pitched 146.2 innings for the Grays and had a 7–7 win–loss record and a 3.13 earned run average (ERA).

== 1884 season ==
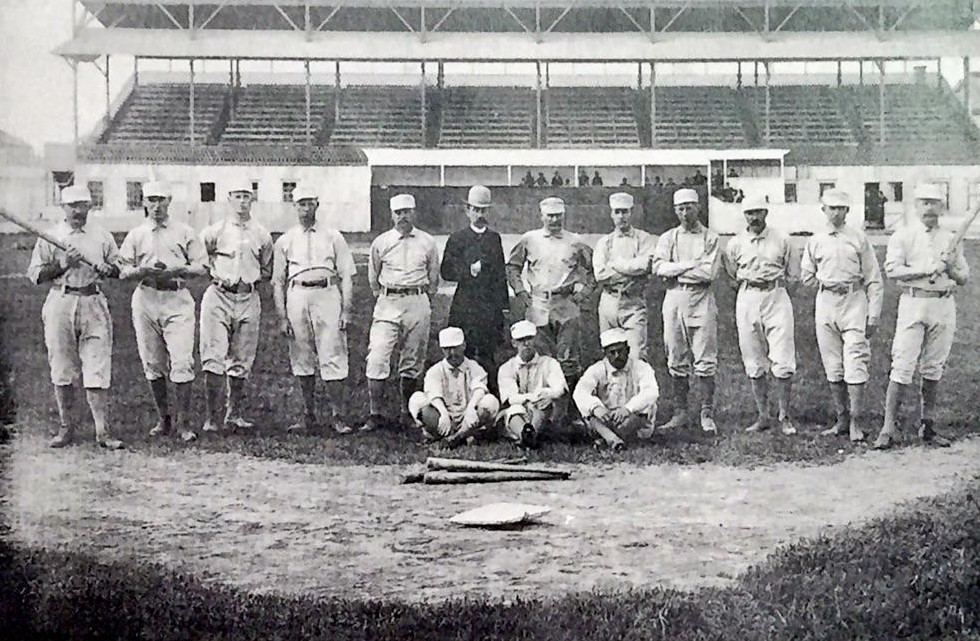
The 1884 Providence Grays. Sweeney is standing second from left, and Radbourn is standing next to him on the far left.

By 1884, Sweeney and Charles Radbourn were the Grays' two main pitchers. The 1884 season had 50 fewer scheduled games than today, and most teams got by with two-man starting rotations. Through much of April and May, Sweeney outshone the veteran and ace of the Grays, Radbourn. This created a lot of tension between the two, as Sweeney was seemingly stealing the limelight from the hobbled but proud "Old Hoss." On June 7, 1884, these tensions reached a zenith, when Sweeney took the box and struck out 19 Boston batters to set a major league record that would be tied a few times but not broken for 102 years, until Roger Clemens struck out 20 in a game in 1986. Sweeney was feted upon his return to Providence for days following his accomplishment, much to the bitter jealousy of Radbourn.

Not long after that, Sweeney suffered arm problems, not uncommon in the day, which sidelined him. The arm trouble may have been a result of his reliance on the "fadeaway", or screwball, which involves turning the wrist outward as the pitch is delivered. This meant Radbourn would suffer the workload of two men, further driving a wedge between the veteran and the upstart. On July 16, Radbourn had a meltdown and was suspended by the team. Sweeney was forced to return to his regular pitching duties, which he did effectively for a time.

Following an exhibition game on July 21 in Woonsocket, Rhode Island, Sweeney, who had allegedly been drinking throughout the game, refused to return with the team to Providence, choosing to stay in Woonsocket with a lady he had escorted to the park that day. Waking the next morning, he realized he missed morning practice and raced to make it back to Providence for his start that afternoon. Though most players in the day were held to temperance clauses during the season, Grays manager Frank Bancroft was left with little choice but to pitch his drunkard ace. After five effective innings, Bancroft signaled for the team captain Joe Start to make a pitching change. Sweeney refused to budge and continued to pitch for another two innings. Before the start of the eighth inning, Bancroft insisted that Sweeney vacate the pitcher's box and move to right field. Possibly still drunk, as well as the prevailing sentiment of 1880s baseball being that finishing a game a pitcher started was a question of manhood, Sweeney flatly refused. When Bancroft threatened the pitcher with a $50 fine, Sweeney told him to take his fine and the rest of his salary, promptly quitting. Sweeney spent the rest of the game watching from the field in street clothes and left with two women, presumably prostitutes. The Grays, frustrated by not only Sweeney, but Radbourn's insubordination, expelled Sweeney from the National League.

Radbourn, who had spent the last several weeks demanding he be paid for doing the work of two men, finally received his wish of being paid both his salary and Sweeney's, along with the promise of a full release from the Grays following the season, as long as he pitched out the season and tried to gain the Grays the pennant. He did just that, pitching almost every game afterward and leading the Grays to the National League championship. Radbourn finished the season with 59 wins, setting an MLB record that has never been broken.

Meanwhile, Sweeney signed with the St. Louis Maroons of the Union Association and became the highest-paid player in the league. The Maroons roared through the "Onion League" and easily won the Union's only championship.

For the season, Sweeney pitched 221 innings for the Grays, going 17–8 with a 1.55 ERA, and 271 innings for the Maroons, going 24–7 with a 1.83 ERA.

== Later baseball career ==
It is possible that Sweeney's arm could not handle the strain of all those innings, because he never pitched as well again. The Maroons joined the National League for a brief time (1885–1886) and Sweeney continued to pitch for them. In 1885, battling arm injuries and drinking heavily, he went 11–21 with a 3.93 ERA in 275 innings. On June 12, 1886, Sweeney gave up seven home runs in a game, which still stands as the MLB record. He was released from the Maroons in mid-season after starting 5–6 with a 4.16 ERA. The following year, he played a few games for the Cleveland Blues of the American Association before being released. Sweeney finished his major league career with a record of 64–52. He then moved on to play for various teams in the California League from 1888 to 1892.

== Later life ==
Sweeney's San Quentin mugshot, November 18, 1894

After returning to San Francisco, Sweeney went into business with his friend, baseball player James McDonald, and married McDonald's sister Jennie. In July 1894, Sweeney shot and killed a man in a fight. The case went to trial, and Sweeney was found guilty of voluntary manslaughter and sentenced to eight years in prison. He was pardoned and released in March 1898 after it was acknowledge that one of the witness's at his trial had perjured himself. He then began working as an umpire in the California League, and in August he got into an argument at a game, assaulted someone, and was arrested.

Sweeney suffered from tuberculosis during the last years of his life. He died in San Francisco in 1902, nine days short of his 39th birthday. He is interred at Cypress Lawn Memorial Park in Colma, California.

== See also ==
- List of Major League Baseball career WHIP leaders
- List of Major League Baseball single-game strikeout leaders
