= List of Major League Baseball records considered unbreakable =

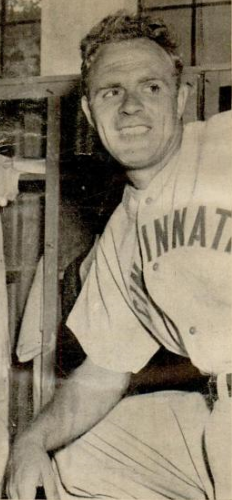
Johnny Vander Meer's elusive record of back-to-back no-hitters in 1938 has been described as "the most unbreakable of all baseball records" by LIFE

Some Major League Baseball (MLB) records are widely regarded as "unbreakable" because they were set by freak occurrence or under rules, techniques, or other circumstances that have since changed. Some records previously regarded as unbreakable have been broken and even re-broken.

== Pitching ==
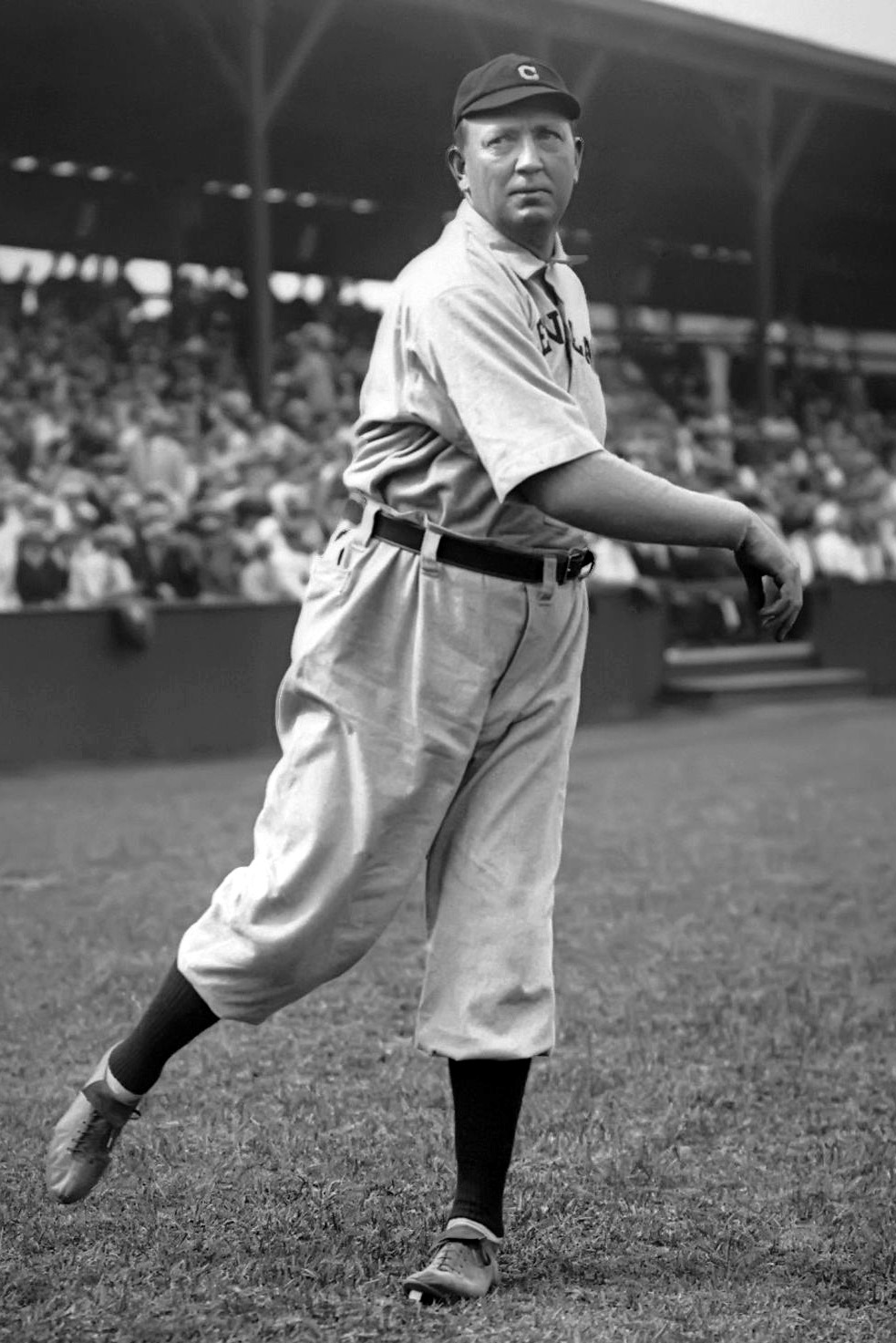
Cy Young's record 511 career wins and 749 complete games have never been approached since he retired in 1911.

=== Most career wins – 511 ===
Set by Cy Young, 1890–1911. Highlights include five 30-win seasons and fifteen 20-win seasons. The next closest player is Walter Johnson with 417, the only other player who reached 400. The most wins by a pitcher who played his entire career in the post-1920 live-ball era is Warren Spahn's 363.

Since 1978, only three pitchers (Ron Guidry in 1978, Steve Stone in 1980, and Bob Welch in 1990) have had one season with 25 wins. Between 2000 and 2009, the Major League leader finished each year with an average of 21. With the retirement of Justin Verlander (266 wins) at the end of the 2026 season, the only pitcher potentially active in 2027 with even 200 wins is the 41-year-old Max Scherzer, with 225. The next active player on the list, Gerrit Cole, ended the 2026 season with 163, and the most wins of any active pitcher under age 30 is Logan Webb's 78.

=== Most wins in a season – 60 ===
Set by Charles Radbourn, in 1884, with Jack Chesbro's 41 in 1904 historically regarded as the modern mark. In today's game of five-man rotations, pitchers do not start enough games to break the record. No pitcher started 34 games in 2024, and only three pitchers in the 21st century have started more than 35 games in a season (Tom Glavine in 2002 and Roy Halladay and Greg Maddux in 2003, each with 36 starts). The last pitcher to start at least 60 games was Bill Hutchison, who started 70 games in 1892. Although relief pitchers often appear in more than the requisite number of games, they rarely record ten wins in a season; the all-time record for wins by a relief pitcher is 18 by Roy Face in 1959. Relief pitcher usage reduces a starter's chance of a win, further limiting the ability to break the record. To put this record in further perspective, the last pitcher to win 30 games in a season was Denny McLain in 1968 and the last pitcher to win more than 25 games in a season was Bob Welch with 27 in 1990. The most wins in a season by any pitcher in the 21st century is 24, by Randy Johnson in 2002 and Justin Verlander in 2011. The reason that the record is considered unbreakable is because Radbourn was a part of a two-man starting pitcher roster, which was common at the time. Also, he had taken on the duties of the Grey's other pitcher, Charlie Sweeney, after he was expelled from the National League.

=== Most career complete games – 749 ===
Set by Cy Young, 1890–1911. Highlights of this record include: nine 40-complete-game seasons, eighteen 30-complete-game seasons and completing 92 percent of his 815 total career starts, an all-time record. The next closest player is Pud Galvin, who has 103 fewer complete games at 646. Among pitchers whose entire careers were in the live-ball era, the most is 382 by Warren Spahn.

Between 2000 and 2009, the Major League leaders in complete games averaged eight per season, and only two pitchers in the 21st century have had 10 complete games in any season (CC Sabathia with 10 in 2008 and James Shields with 11 in 2011). In addition, only two pitchers other than Young have even started as many as 749 games—Nolan Ryan (773) and Don Sutton (756). Among pitchers expected to be active in 2027, the leader is Chris Sale with 17.

The quest for any complete-game records, either over a career or over a single season, is further complicated by the drastic change in philosophy embraced by virtually all modern managers and pitching coaches, motivated in roughly equal parts by more advanced modern-day medical knowledge of the cumulative damage that pitching does to a hurler's arm, combined with teams' reluctance to see injuries to a pitcher in whom they have invested considerable financial capital in the form of a big contract. Another factor, arguably, is the greater reliance of managers and pitching coaches on sabermetrics—in this case, statistical data and analysis that generally show leaving a starter to face more batters leads to diminishing returns in terms of opposing batters allowed to reach base safely and score runs. While even a few decades ago, a starting pitcher was expected to go out and attempt to pitch a complete game, with the manager going to his bullpen only if the starter ran into trouble or was injured or visibly tiring, now a starter is expected to give his manager six or seven "quality innings," at which point he normally will be relieved by one or more middle-inning specialists to pitch the next several innings before the team's closer. There are exceptions—a manager will leave a starter in who is working on a no-hitter or, sometimes, a shutout, or will let a starter continue if he is pitching particularly strongly and has not run up a high pitch count. But managerial caution is now a more dominant mode, particularly if a pitcher is coming off a recent injury or has had Tommy John surgery or any other major procedure done on his pitching arm.

These changes in philosophy have reduced the number of complete games in today's game to an even greater extent than in the first decade of the 21st century. Since Shields completed 11 games in 2011, no pitcher has had more than 6 complete games in a season, with the two most recent to amass 6 being Chris Sale in 2016 and Sandy Alcántara in 2022. In 2018, all of Major League Baseball combined for 45 complete games and no pitcher having more than 3. In a 2019 story, Sam Miller of ESPN went so far as to say, "In your lifetime, you might very well see the last complete game." In 2016, managerial caution reached a new milestone when Los Angeles Dodgers pitcher Rich Hill was pulled while working on a potential perfect game.

=== Most complete games in a season – 75 ===
All-time record of 75 set by Will White in 1879; modern-era record of 48 set by Jack Chesbro in 1904. Sports Illustrated has said about this record, "Even if the bar is lowered to begin with the live-ball era (which began in 1920), the mark would still be untouchable." The most complete games recorded in a live-ball season is 33, achieved three times in all—twice at the dawn of that era by Grover Cleveland Alexander in 1920 and Burleigh Grimes in 1923, and also by Dizzy Trout in 1944, a season in which the player pool was severely depleted by military call-ups during World War II. Modern starters can expect to start about 34 games in a season while fully healthy.

=== Most career shutouts – 110 ===
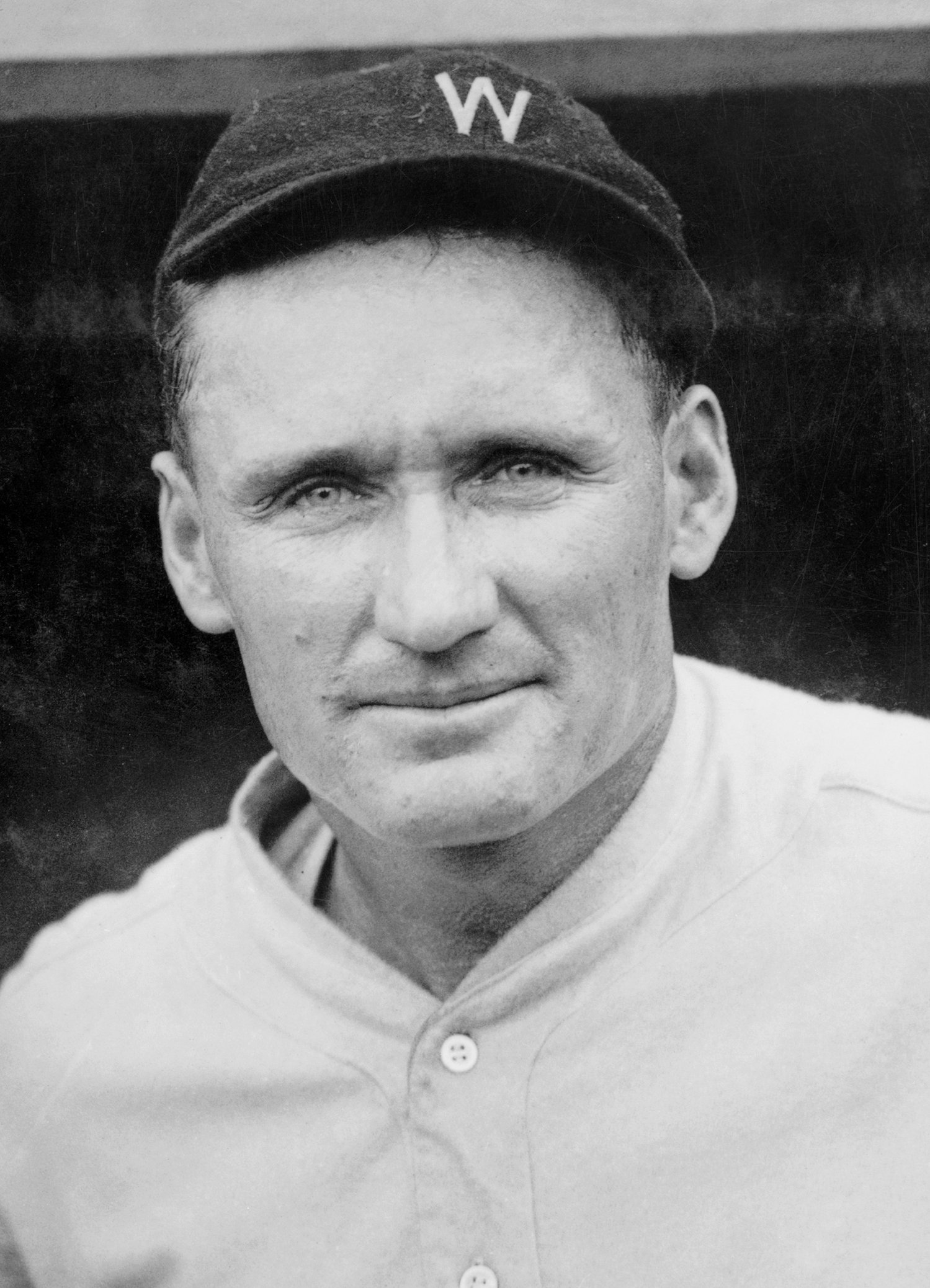
Walter Johnson's 110 career shutouts are 47 ahead of anyone who has played since 1965.

Set by Walter Johnson, 1907–1927. Highlights include: 11 seasons with at least six-shutouts, and leading the league in shutouts seven times. The next closest player is Grover Cleveland Alexander, who has 90. As is the case for career wins and complete games, Warren Spahn, who retired in 1965, holds the record among pitchers whose entire careers were in the live-ball era, with 63.

For a player to tie Johnson's record, he would have to pitch five shutouts every season for 22 years. Between 2010 and 2019, the Major League leader in shutouts finished each year with an average of three, and no pitcher has recorded more than two shutouts in a season since 2017. Also, adding the MLB-leading shutout totals for each season from 1992 through 2019 results in a total of 106, still short of Johnson's record.

=== Most shutouts in a season – 16 ===
Set first by George Bradley in 1876 and equaled by Grover Cleveland Alexander in 1916; live-ball era record of 13 set by Bob Gibson in 1968.

Sam Miller of ESPN had this to say about a rhetorical suggestion that the live-ball record of 13 could be broken: "This is the stupidest suggestion yet. Thirteen shutouts clearly belongs in the anachronism pile." He pointed out that neither the National nor American League had 13 combined shutouts in the 2018 season, and no pitcher had more than one in that season.

=== Most consecutive no-hitters – 2 ===
Set by Johnny Vander Meer on June 11 and 15, 1938. Despite holding this record, he finished his career with a 119–121 win–loss record. The prospect of a pitcher breaking this record by hurling three no-hitters in a row is so unimaginable that LIFE argued "it's easier to imagine someone hitting in 57 straight games or bashing 74 home runs in a season or ending the season with a 1.11 ERA." Ewell Blackwell came the closest to matching Vander Meer after following up a no-hitter with eight no-hit innings in 1947. In 1988, Dave Stieb of the Toronto Blue Jays had consecutive no-hitters going with two outs and two strikes in the ninth; both were broken up by singles. Between 2010 and 2019, 35 no-hitters were pitched (not including five combined no-hitters involving multiple pitchers), and the closest anyone came in the 21st century is Max Scherzer, who in 2015 threw a one-hitter and no-hitter in consecutive starts, respectively losing out on perfect games in the seventh inning and on the 27th batter.

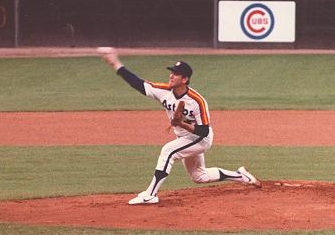
Nolan Ryan was a dominating power pitcher who holds career records in strikeouts, no-hitters, and bases on balls – all by large margins. His record 27 years on the mound also may be safe.

=== Most career no-hitters – 7 ===
Set by Nolan Ryan, 1966–1993. Sandy Koufax is second with four. Larry Corcoran, Cy Young, Bob Feller, and Justin Verlander have all thrown three.

In all, 26 pitchers have thrown two, including active player Max Scherzer. An additional 30 active pitchers have played a part in one, including 20 who have thrown an individual no-hitter. Between 2000 and 2009, 20 no-hitters in all were thrown—19 of them solo no-hitters and one a combined no-hitter (in which more than one pitcher contributed). The following decade (2010–2019) saw the number of no-hitters double from the 2000s, with 40 (36 solo, 4 combined).

=== Most career strikeouts – 5,714 ===
Set by Nolan Ryan, 1966–1993. Highlights include: six 300-strikeout seasons, fifteen 200-strikeout seasons, and leading the league in strikeouts 11 times. To accomplish this record, Ryan played the most seasons (27) in MLB history, as well as being both second in career innings pitched in the live-ball era, and fourth among pitchers who have completed their careers in strikeouts per nine innings.

The next closest player is Randy Johnson, who has 839 fewer strikeouts at 4,875. Johnson also had four consecutive 300-strikeout seasons at the turn of the 21st century (1999–2002); the only pitchers with a 300-strikeout season after 2002 are Clayton Kershaw, who had 301 in 2015; Chris Sale, with 308 in 2017; Max Scherzer, with 300 in 2018; and Gerrit Cole and Justin Verlander, respectively with 326 and 300 in 2019. For a player to approach this record, he would have to average 225 strikeouts over 25 seasons just to get to 5,625. Averaging 250 strikeouts over 23 seasons would enable him to surpass the record with 5,750. Between 2010 and 2019 the Major League leader in strikeouts finished each year with an average of 279, and even that average is skewed with the aforementioned large strikeout seasons late in the decade. No pitcher exceeded 280 strikeouts between 2005 and 2014. Since then, only eight 280-strikeout seasons have been recorded—the five aforementioned 300-strikeout performances, plus Scherzer's 284 in 2016, Verlander's 290 in 2018, and Spencer Strider's 281 in 2023. Verlander retired at the end of the 2026 season with 3,560, placing him eighth on the all-time list; Scherzer, who is publicly considering retirement, is immediately behind him with 3,557. The next player on the list expected to play in 2027 is Sale with 2,779.

=== Most career bases on balls – 2,795 ===
Set by Nolan Ryan, 1966–1993. Ryan has greater than 50 percent more walks than the next highest (Steve Carlton with 1,833). Should Max Scherzer play in 2027, he would be the active leader, having finished the 2026 season with 814.

=== Most innings pitched in a season – 680 ===
Set by Will White in the same 1879 season in which he set the record of 75 complete games noted above (at this time the distance from mound to plate was 45 feet). The record pitching from the distance used since 1893 (60 feet 6 inches) is 482 innings that first year by Amos Rusie, which had been exceeded 85 times by pitchers working from 45 or (starting in 1881) 50 feet, including by Rusie himself the three previous consecutive seasons, but has never been approached since (Ed Walsh in 1908 was the last to pitch 400 innings in a season). The most innings pitched in a live-ball season (since 1920) was Wilbur Wood's 376^{2}/_{3} innings in 1972.

No pitcher has even thrown half of White's record total for innings in a season since Phil Niekro in 1979, with 342. The most recent 300-inning season was by Steve Carlton the following year, with 304. The highest single-season innings count in the 21st century was Roy Halladay's 266 in 2003, and the six lowest innings totals for an MLB leader in the sport's history (apart from three shortened seasons—1981 and 1994 due to strikes, and 2020 due to COVID-19) have all occurred since 2016—Logan Webb with 207 innings in 2025, Logan Gilbert with 208 2/3 in 2024, Chris Sale with 214^{1}/_{3} in 2017, Logan Webb with 216 in 2023, Max Scherzer with 220^{2}/_{3} in 2018, Justin Verlander with 223 in 2019, and Zack Wheeler with 213^{1}/_{3} in 2021.

=== Most career wild pitches thrown – 343 ===
Set by Tony Mullane, who pitched from 1881 to 1894. Mullane pitched through 4,531 1/3 innings, 24th all-time, throwing 343 wild pitches and averaged an errant pitch in 7.6 percent of those innings. Nolan Ryan is second on the list of most wild pitches with 277. The active leader in wild pitches as of October 2026 is Sonny Gray with 107, less than a third of Mullane's total. Modern pitchers throw wild pitches less frequently and pitch fewer innings.

=== Most innings pitched in a single game – 26 ===
Set by Leon Cadore and Joe Oeschger, respectively of the Brooklyn Dodgers and Boston Braves, who were the only pitchers in a 26-inning marathon on May 1, 1920 that ended in a 1–1 tie due to darkness. Many commentators have cited this record as unbreakable, noting that modern teams generally use more than one pitcher in a regulation game, much less one that goes into extra innings.

== Batting ==
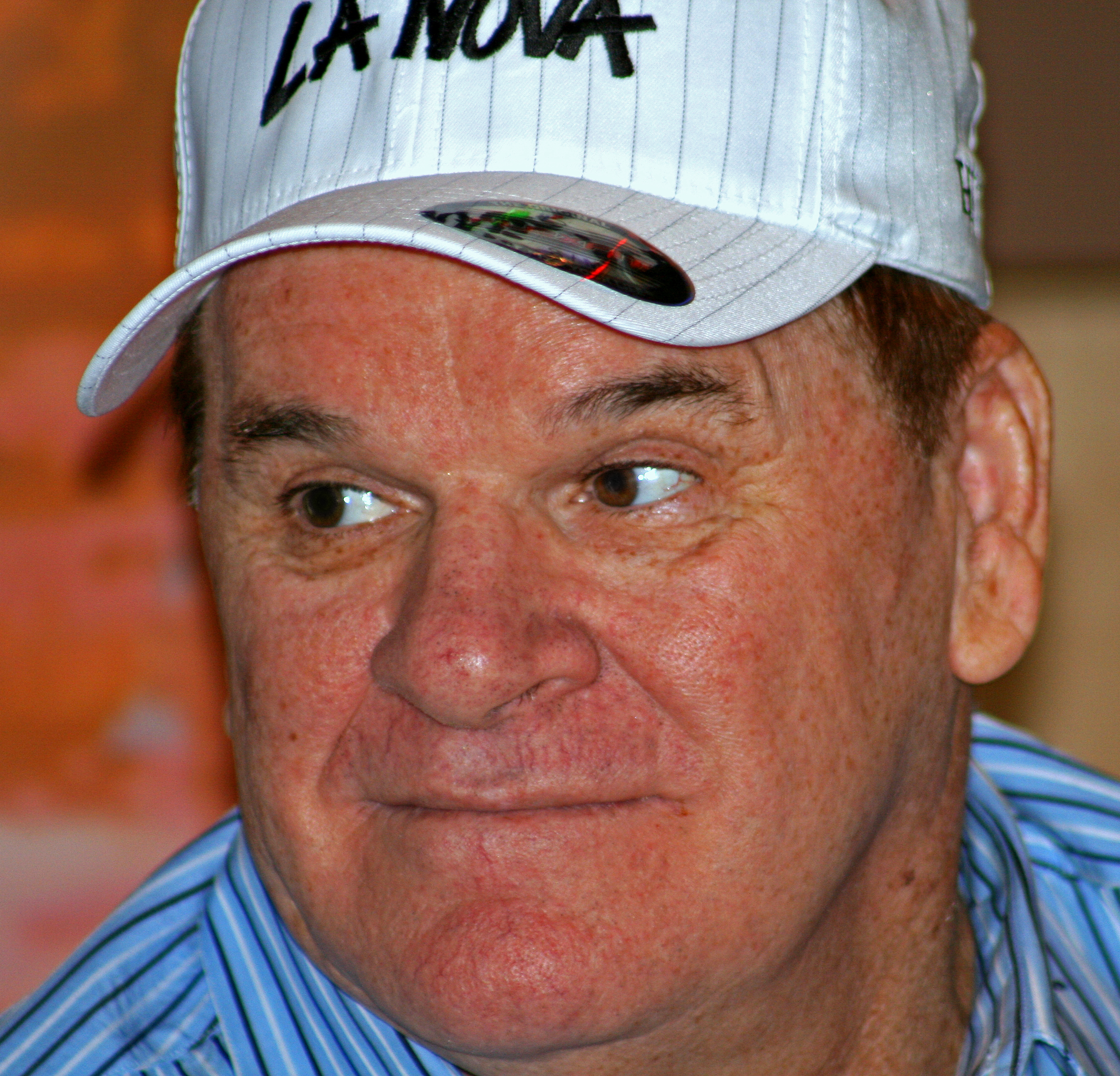
Pete Rose topped 200 hits 10 times and averaged nearly 180 a season over his 24-year career to amass a record 4,256 hits

=== Most career hits – 4,256 ===
Set by Pete Rose, 1963–1986. No active major league player is at this time considered to be close to breaking Rose's mark. Following the retirement of Albert Pujols (3,384) at the end of the 2022 season and Miguel Cabrera (3,174) at the end of the 2023 season, no active player has even 3,000 hits. The youngest player with at least 2,000 career hits is Manny Machado, with 2,197 hits at the age of 34. He would have to average more than 200 hits over the next ten-plus seasons to break the record. To get within 6 hits of tying Rose, a player would have to collect 250 hits for 17 straight seasons, or more than 200 hits over the course of 21 seasons. In the past 81 years, only Ichiro Suzuki, whose first season in Major League Baseball was his tenth in the top professional ranks, following nine years in his native Japan, has topped 250 hits in a season (with 262 hits in 2004). Ichiro ended his playing career with 3,089 MLB hits and 1,278 hits in the Japanese major leagues (averaging just 106 games and 142 hits a year in much shorter Japanese seasons) for a combined, unofficial total of 4,367, 111 more than Rose's record; however, Ichiro's hits from Japan's major leagues are not counted toward his MLB total. At the end of the 2023 season, Cabrera retired with 3,174 hits after 21 seasons. No player younger than Cabrera was within 500 hits of his career total at the end of the 2023 season, and among players no older than 30 at that time, only Francisco Lindor had even 1,300 career hits (1,323). At the end of the 2026 season, the leader among players no older than 30 was Rafael Devers with 1,359.

=== Most career plate appearances – 15,890 ===
Also set by Rose. MLB.com writer Matt Kelly noted in a 2023 story on records he saw as unbreakable that it was difficult to "imagine any player not only equaling Rose's 24 big league seasons, but also maintaining the excellence required to average 662 plate appearances per season as the Hit King did." Kelly added that Pujols had just ended his 22-season MLB career more than 2,800 plate appearances behind Rose.

=== Most career total bases – 6,856 ===
Set by Hank Aaron, 1954–1976. His total is more than 600 greater than second-place Pujols (6,211), and the active leader, the 37-year-old Freddie Freeman, had only 4,394 at the end of the 2026 season. At the end of the 2026 season, the leader among players no older than 30 is Rafael Devers with 2,525, less than 40% of Aaron's total.

=== Most hits in a season – 262 ===
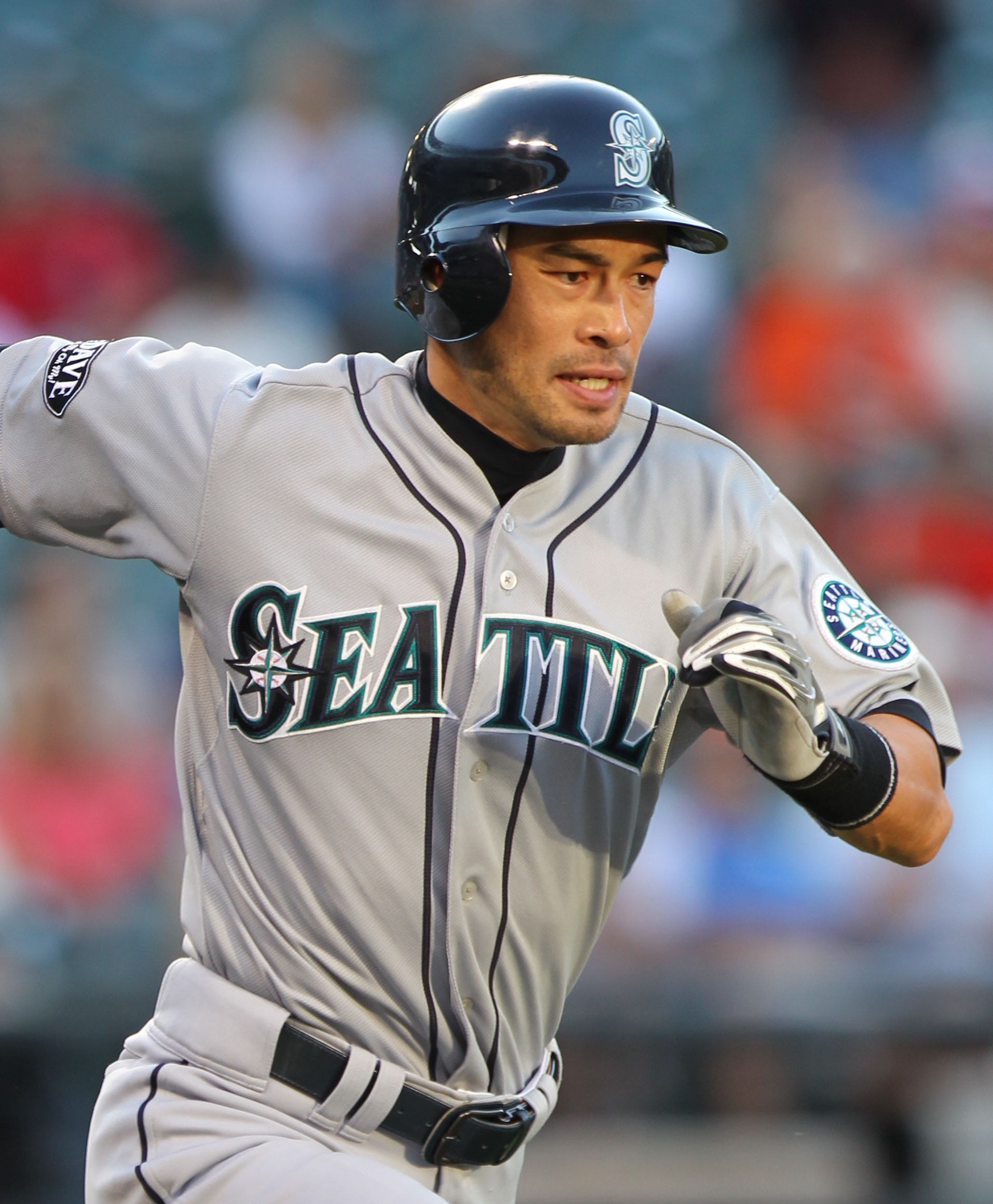
Ichiro Suzuki only began his Major League career at 27 after nine record-setting seasons in Japan. He holds the mark for most hits in a season (262) and may well have set it for most career hits had he played entirely in MLB.

Set by Ichiro Suzuki in 2004, breaking a record that had been set in 1920 by George Sisler (257). Writing in 2019 for ESPN, Sam Miller argued that this relatively young record is nonetheless unlikely to be broken. He noted that the only active player who had collected more than 225 hits in any season was Ichiro himself, who had done so three times. The next-highest total since 2000 was 240 hits by Darin Erstad in 2000.

Miller wrote that in today's game, "few elite hitters are as walk-averse as Ichiro was permitted to be", which he argued would keep other players from approaching the record. The MLB leader in at-bats in 2018 was Trea Turner with 664; a player with that number of at-bats would have to hit .396 to reach 263 hits—a batting average that Miller had argued in 2018 was unapproachable in the modern game. He added,

The outer limit for at-bats – say, a leadoff hitter for a high-scoring team who plays every game and has a 10th-percentile walk rate – is perhaps 725, nine higher than the all-time record. And even the 725-AB guy would need to hit .363, a mark not met by any hitter in this decade.

The aforementioned Matt Kelly added that Ichiro had 704 at-bats in the 2004 season, making him one of only four players with more than 700 at-bats in a season. Kelly added, "So to break this record, you'd have to hit .373 and log more than 700 ABs. Good luck."

=== Most consecutive seasons with 200 hits – 10 ===
Set by Ichiro Suzuki, from 2001 to 2010. The closest player is Willie Keeler, who had eight consecutive seasons with 200 hits almost a century earlier, in the dead-ball era. No players at all had 200 hits in the 2013, 2018, 2020, 2021, 2022, 2025, and 2026 seasons; in 2023 only three players had 200 hits; in 2019, only Whit Merrifield and Rafael Devers did so, and only Bobby Witt Jr. and Luis Arráez reached the mark in 2024.

=== Most career doubles – 792 ===
Set by Tris Speaker, 1907–1928. Highlights include: five 50-double seasons, ten 40-double seasons, and leading the league in doubles eight times. The next closest player is Pete Rose, who has 46 fewer doubles at 746. Among hitters whose entire careers were in the live-ball era, the leader in career doubles is Rose.

For a player to threaten Speaker's record, he would have to average 39 doubles over 20 seasons just to get to 780, or 40 doubles in 20 seasons to break the record. Between 2010 and 2019 the Major League leader in doubles finished each year with an average of 51, with José Ramírez setting a decade-high of 57 doubles during the 2017 season; the highest total since 2000 is the 59 hit by Freddie Freeman in 2023. However, players tend to hit fewer doubles as they age, thus making it difficult for most players to keep hitting doubles consistently for long enough to challenge the record. The only active player with 500 doubles is Freeman, who ended the 2026 season with 579. At the end of the 2026 season, the only player no older than 30 with even 300 career doubles was Rafael Devers, who turned 30 shortly after the end of the season with 324 doubles. In order to break the record, Freeman would need to average 43 doubles over 5 seasons, and Devers would need to average 47 doubles over 10 seasons or 43 over 11 seasons.

=== Most career triples – 309 ===
Set by Sam Crawford, 1899–1916. Highlights include: five 20-triple seasons and sixteen 10-triple seasons. The next closest player is Ty Cobb, who has 14 fewer triples at 295. Because of changes in playing styles and ballparks that began around 1920 and have continued into the present from the dead-ball era to the live-ball era, the number of triples hit has declined noticeably since then. Among hitters whose entire careers were in the live-ball era, the leader in career triples is Paul Waner, with 191.

For a player to threaten Crawford's record, he would have to average 15 triples over 20 seasons just to get to 300. Between 2010 and 2019 the Major League leader in triples finished each year with an average of 13, and no player in that decade had more than 16 in a season. The most triples by any hitter so far in the 2020s is 17, by Corbin Carroll in 2025 and 2026. At the end of the 2026 season, the closest active player was Carroll with 60.

=== Most triples in a season – 36 ===
Set by Chief Wilson in 1912. Only two other players have ever had 30 triples in a season (Dave Orr with 31 in 1886 and Heinie Reitz with 31 in 1894), while the closest anyone has come in the century since Wilson set the record is 26, shared by Sam Crawford (1914) and Kiki Cuyler (1925). Only six hitters have had 20 triples in the last 50 years: George Brett (20 in 1979), Willie Wilson (21 in 1985), Lance Johnson (21 in 1996), Cristian Guzmán (20 in 2000), Curtis Granderson (23 in 2007) and Jimmy Rollins (20 in 2007).

Sam Miller also added that Chief Wilson was playing his home games in Forbes Field, which in 1912 had a 460-foot (140 m) center-field distance, noticeably longer than any current MLB park. In his record-setting season, Wilson hit 24 triples at home, a total that has not been surpassed in an entire season since 1925. Additionally, Wilson himself never hit more than 14 triples in any other season. On top of this, no minor-league player has ever had more than 31 triples in a season, despite that level of the game having less capable defenders, many quirky ballparks (more so in past decades than today), and in some historical cases much longer seasons.

=== Most walks drawn in a season – 232; most intentional walks drawn in a season – 120 ===
Both records set by Barry Bonds in 2004. The aforementioned Matt Kelly noted that the only other player who had drawn even 170 walks in a season was Babe Ruth in 1923. As for intentional walks, Bonds himself is the only player to have drawn even half of his 2004 total in any other season (68 in 2002, 61 in 2003); the next-highest player is Willie McCovey with 45 in 1969.

=== Highest career batting average – .372 ===
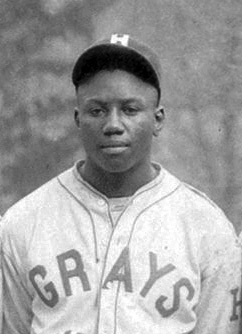
Josh Gibson batted over .300 in all but one season of his 14-year career en route to a career batting average of .372.

Set by Josh Gibson in 1946 after beginning his career in 1930, though only considered to be the record by Major League Baseball from 2024 onwards. Highlights of this record include a slash line of .366/.437/.696 through 941 plate appearances from 1933 to 1936; a .417 average and 40 home runs in 39 games in 1937; regular batting averages well over .300 for the final four seasons of his career (including a record .466 average in 1943) despite battling severe headaches due to a brain tumor that he refused to have removed; and leading the Negro leagues in batting average three times. The next-closest player is Ty Cobb who had a batting average of .366. Gibson and Cobb's careers were played entirely separately; Gibson made his professional debut two years after Cobb's retirement and spent his entire career in the Negro leagues, playing for the Homestead Grays and the Pittsburgh Crawfords before he died at the age of 35 on January 20, 1947. There are only five players with a career average of .350 or higher, three of whom played exclusively in the Negro leagues: Gibson, Oscar Charleston, and Jud Wilson. At the end of the 2026 season, the only active players with a .300 batting average are Luis Arráez at .316 and Yordan Alvarez at .300, with Jose Altuve at .2997 (rounding to .300).

The record was previously held by Cobb until the integration of Negro league statistics into Major League Baseball's record books on May 28, 2024. Since then, Gibson not only holds the new record for career batting average, but also the records for career OPS with 1.177 and slugging percentage with .718, as well as the single-season records in all three categories. Gibson set the both single-season records for OPS and slugging in the 1937 season with 1.474 and .974, respectively, and the single-season batting average record in 1943 with .466.

=== Highest single-season batting average – .466 ===
The highest single-season average in major-league history is .466, recorded by Josh Gibson in 1943 in 249 at-bats, recognized since the integration of Negro league statistics on May 28, 2024. The previous record holder was Hugh Duffy, with a batting average of .440 in 1894 in 539 at-bats. Also passing Duffy's number upon the integration is Chino Smith, who batted .451 in 1929 in 246 at-bats. As well, upon integration of statistics, Gibson became the most recent player in any major league to top .400 for a season, having done so two years after Ted Williams' famous .406 season in 1941. Since then, only George Brett, who hit .390 in 1980, and Tony Gwynn, who hit .394 in a strike-shortened season in 1994, have come close to reaching .400, although without approaching the historical record. Since Williams and Gibson batted above .400, the latest in a season that any player has had a qualified .400 average (or higher) is 134 games by Brett in 1980, followed by 107 games by John Olerud in 1993, 96 games by Larry Walker in 1997, and 91 games by Nomar Garciaparra in 2000. Levi Meyerle hit .492 for the Philadelphia Athletics of the National Association in 1871. However, MLB does not regard the National Association as a major league.

In a 2018 ESPN story, Sam Miller argued that it was impossible to hit .400, or even seriously challenge the mark, in the modern game, noting that no hitter in the 21st century entered the second half of the season with an average above .380, and at that time, no batter since 2009 who qualified for his league's batting title had a .400 average at any point after May 25. Additionally, Miller argued that a player who might conceivably challenge .400 would have to combine a low strikeout rate, high home run rate, and high batting average on balls in play—a group of skills which largely do not complement one another. Since Miller's article was published, Luis Arráez had a .400 average on June 24, 2023, 78 games into the season; Arraez ultimately finished the season with a .354 average.

=== Most RBI in a season – 191 ===
Set by Hack Wilson, who batted in 191 runs in 1930. Only Lou Gehrig and Hank Greenberg, at 184 and 183 RBI respectively, ever came close, and there have been no real challenges to the record for over 90 years.

However, Sam Miller argued in ESPN in 2019 that a serious challenge to Wilson's record, though highly unlikely, was less implausible than challenges to many of the other records listed here. He noted that in 1930, Wilson came to bat with 524 runners on base, drove in 22.7% of them, and hit 56 homers. Neither the number of baserunners nor the RBI percentage is within the top 60 seasons for those statistics in MLB history, with some seasons in the top 60 of both categories having been recorded in the 21st century, and he added "we've all seen players hit 56 home runs, even this decade."

=== Most runs scored in a season – 198 ===
Set by Billy Hamilton in 1894; modern-era (post-19th century) record of 177 set by Babe Ruth in 1921. Matt Kelly, who analyzed only Ruth's record, noted that while Ruth had benefited from a New York Yankees lineup that collectively hit .300, he also hit 59 home runs, then an MLB record, and reached base 353 times, still the fifth-highest total in the modern era. Only one player in the modern era was within 10 runs of Ruth's record (Lou Gehrig with 167 in 1936), and the highest total since 1950 was Jeff Bagwell's 152 in 2000.

=== Highest career on-base percentage – .482 ===
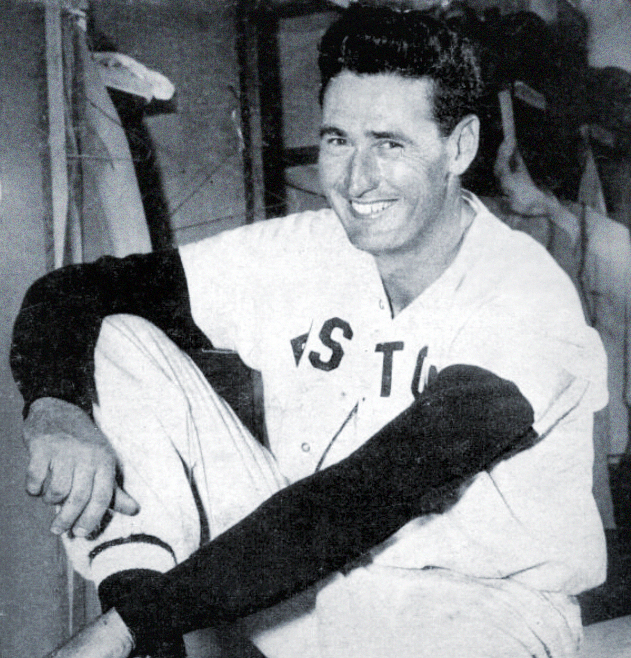
Ted Williams topped a .400 on-base percentage 18 times in his 19 years, often by 100 points or more, including .553 en route to a .406 batting average in 1941, the last season ever over .400.

Set by Ted Williams from 1939 to 1960. Williams, the last man to hit .400 in an AL or NL season (.406 in 1941), won six American League batting titles, two Triple Crowns, and two MVP awards. He ended his career with 521 home runs and a .344 career batting average. Williams achieved these numbers and honors despite missing nearly five full seasons to military service and injuries. The next-closest player in career OBP is Babe Ruth at .474.

Since Williams' retirement, only five players have posted an OBP above .482 in a season for eight times in total: Barry Bonds (four times, 2001~2004), Norm Cash (1961), Mickey Mantle (1962), Frank Thomas (1994), and Juan Soto (2020). Bonds ended his career with an OBP of .444; the leader among active players is Juan Soto, at .415 after the 2026 season.

=== Most regular season games played, season – 165 ===
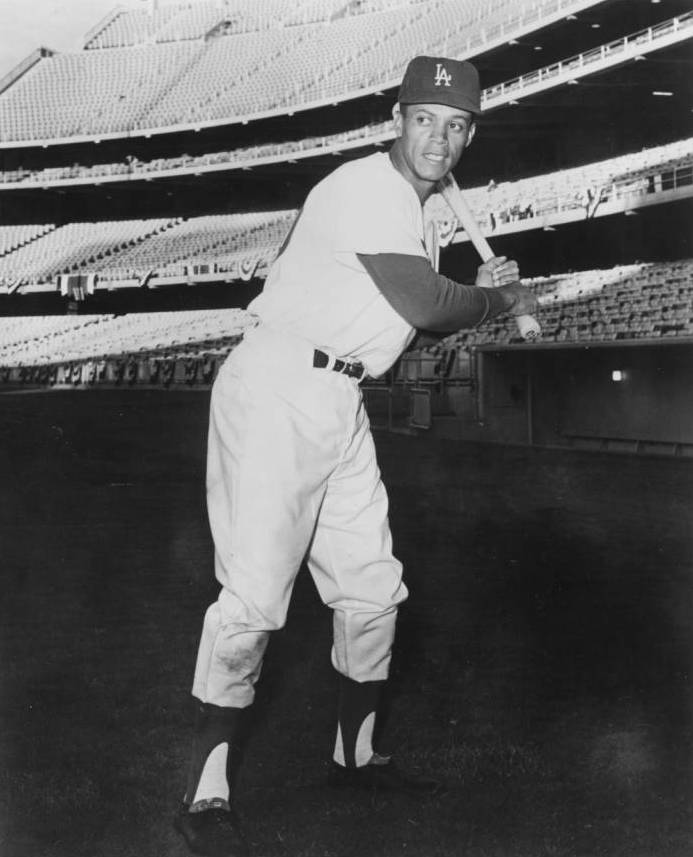
Maury Wills was the National League Most Valuable Player (MVP) in 1962, stealing a new single-season topping 104 bases in those record 165 games to break the old modern mark of 96, set by Ty Cobb in 156 games in 1915.

The record was set in 1962 by Los Angeles Dodgers shortstop Maury Wills, who played in all of the team's 165 regular-season games that year thanks to a best-of-three playoff between the Dodgers and San Francisco Giants, which ended the season tied for first place. At the time, league pennants were decided in the regular season, and winners went directly to the World Series without any multi-tiered playoffs. Because the play-off was counted as an extension of the regular season, and not the post-season, both the Dodgers and Giants played 165 games since the play-off series went the full three games.

Both the individual and team single-season games played records were set at the beginning of a seven-year span that began with the 1962 National League schedule expansion to 162 games and ended after the 1968 season, when the NL replaced its traditional best-of-three tiebreakers with one-game playoffs. The 1962 season was the only occasion during those years in which a tie-breaker was needed. Until the abolition of tie-breaker games prior to the 2022 season, the American League always used one-game playoffs.

Prior to the end of the 2021 season, there were a few occasions prior when three or more teams could have tied for postseason berths going into the last day of the season, which under the rules then in force would have resulted in one or more teams having to play at least two other teams in successive tie-breakers. However, a multi-team tie involving postseason berths never occurred, meaning that, other than in the aforementioned 1962 season, no team ever played more than 163 regular season games.

As part of the provisions of the 2022 Basic Agreement, MLB expanded the playoffs and replaced one-game tie-breaker games with performance-based criteria to break future ties. Thus, unless and until the regular-season schedule is extended, which is considered extremely unlikely since all subsequent expansions to the season length after 1962 have been to extend the postseason, no team will play more than 162 regular-season games, unless the team is involved in a tied game, discussed in more detail below.

Historically, there have been two other ways for a player to accumulate more than 162 games played in a season. The first is if the player changes teams in a mid-season trade - a swap to a team that has played fewer games can result in a schedule for the traded player being greater than either individual teams'. Presently, 1970s-era speedster Frank Taveras holds the records for both most regularly scheduled MLB games played in a season and most games played for two teams in the same season, both 164, done in 1979. However, even by this method Wills' individual record is statistically ever more unlikely to be broken because teams are increasingly inclined to rest even their best players as part of a new sabermetrics-based strategy known as "load management". As of the early 2020's, only about three players on average in all of baseball appear in even 162 regular season games of any given MLB season.

The other method in which a player can be credited with more than 162 games played is when games are called with the score tied after the game becomes official, i.e., after five or more innings are played. In recent decades, this was almost always due to adverse weather, although historically such games were also called due to darkness and/or curfews. Due to the tie score, such games did not count in the official standings and were replayed in their entirety. However, player statistics still counted, allowing for example Hideki Matsui to play 163 games for the New York Yankees in 2003. The rules were changed in 2007 to require such tie games to be suspended. The games are then completed at a later date (rather than replayed in full) if feasible and/or required to determine postseason qualification. This change makes such a scenario highly unlikely to be seen again.

=== Most consecutive games played – 2,632 ===
Set by Cal Ripken Jr., 1982–1998. Lou Gehrig, whose record Ripken surpassed in 1995, had a consecutive games streak of 2,130 games, 502 fewer, from 1925 to 1939. Third on the all-time list is Everett Scott, whose streak of 1,307 consecutive games is less than half of Ripken's total. Only seven players have ever played more than 1,000 consecutive games. For a player to approach the milestone, he would have to play all 162 games in a season for 16 years just to get to 2,592 games.

As stated by LIFE, "no one else has ever come close, and no one ever will." On average, over the preceding ten seasons from 2009 to 2018 only three players have played all 162 regularly scheduled games in a particular season.

=== Longest hitting streak – 56 games ===
With pitching the way it is—specialty guys, closer and setup guys—you're not going to have a chance to get four at-bats against one guy. On one night, you might face four different guys. I'm still amazed DiMaggio got to 56. I'm amazed now when somebody gets to 30.

— Robin Ventura, who set the NCAA Division I record of hitting in 58 consecutive games

Set by Joe DiMaggio, 1941. Highlights of his hitting streak include a .408 batting average and 91 hits. The next closest player is Willie Keeler, with 45 over two seasons in 1896–97. There have been only six 40-game hitting streaks, and only Pete Rose's 44 in 1978 since DiMaggio's. Since 1900, no player other than DiMaggio has ever hit safely in even 55 of 56 games, and no active players (as of 2019) have their two longest career hit streaks even add up to 56 games.

On July 17, 1941, pitchers Al Smith and Jim Bagby of the Cleveland Indians held DiMaggio hitless. Two hard hit shots came close, but great defensive stops by third baseman Ken Keltner ended the streak. "Joltin' Joe" actually hit in 57 straight MLB games – singling in the 1941 All-Star game held mid-streak – and 73 out of 74 regular season games, starting a 17-game streak the day after his 56-game one ended. He also holds the second longest streak in minor league baseball history, 61 games, set in 1933.

The improbability of DiMaggio's hitting streak ever being broken has been attributed to increased bullpen use, including specialist relievers.

=== Most career home runs by a pitcher – 37 ===
Set by Wes Ferrell, who hit 37 home runs while playing for the Indians, Red Sox, Senators and Yankees during the late 1920s and most of the 1930s (Ferrell hit one more home run while with the Braves in 1941, bringing his total to 38 – 37 as a pitcher and one as a pinch-hitter – the most for any MLB pitcher). With a total of 326 hits in 1,176 at-bats in his 17-year career, Ferrell hit .280 and had 208 RBIs, and is considered one of baseball's best-hitting pitchers.

Other pitchers with more than thirty career home runs include Bob Lemon, who hit 35 HR as a pitcher and two more as a pinch hitter during his 18-year career, all spent with the Indians; Warren Spahn, who hit 35 while playing for the Braves and is the all-time National League leader; Red Ruffing, who had 34 home runs as a pitcher and two more as pinch-hitter over 22 seasons with the Red Sox, Yankees and White Sox; and Earl Wilson, who hit 35 home runs in an 11-year career – 33 as a pitcher and two as a pinch-hitter – all but one of them while with the Red Sox and Tigers, and the last as a Padre.

By the latter half of the twentieth century, "good-hitting pitchers" had clearly become the exception rather than the rule. The American League's adoption of the designated hitter rule in 1973 led to the widespread substitution of the DH in the pitcher's slot in the batting order in regular season, All-Star and postseason games played in AL parks. Since then, Ferrell's record has been widely considered an unbreakable AL record. Even after AL pitchers resumed batting more frequently in 1997, with the introduction of interleague play, no American League pitcher has received enough at-bats to seriously challenge any of the above home run statistics (or any other game, seasonal or career hitting marks set by AL pitchers historically).

While pitchers would continue to bat in National League parks for almost a half century after the AL introduced the DH, the aforementioned changes to in-game team management and season structure during that period made a serious challenge to Farrell's record increasingly unlikely - specifically, the introduction of interleague play conversely meant that NL pitchers received fewer at-bats since their teams used the DH when playing in AL parks and the aforementioned drastic reduction in complete games (and corresponding increasing use of relief pitchers) in turn increased the opportunity to use pinch hitters in the pitcher's spot in the batting order. All these factors combined to substantially reduce the number of at-bats per game any individual pitcher could have expected to receive even in NL parks. The career MLB leader for home runs by a pitcher since the introduction of the DH in the AL is Carlos Zambrano, who played his entire career in the interleague era and recorded 24 homers in NL parks.

During the pandemic-shortened 2020 season, the DH was used throughout MLB, although it was dropped again in NL parks for the 2021 season. As part of the new Basic Agreement prior to the 2022 season, MLB owners and players agreed to the permanent inclusion of the DH in all MLB parks. At the time of the permanent implementation of a universal DH, the leader among then-active pitchers was Madison Bumgarner with 19 home runs.

A notable caveat to the unbreakability of this record concerns Japanese player Shohei Ohtani, who has excelled as both a starting pitcher and a designated hitter since signing with the Los Angeles Angels in 2018. Ohtani's signing led to speculation that Ferrell's record would quickly be broken; however, Ohtani did not hit and pitch in the same game until the 2021 season and MLB quickly clarified that his home runs hit while not pitching would not be scored as being hit "by a pitcher." Notably, Ohtani hit 46 home runs in the 2021 season alone. This total includes the first three of his career (all in AL parks) that Ohtani hit while pitching. The implementation of the universal DH essentially coincided with additional rule change dubbed the "Ohtani rule" that allows batting pitchers to remain in the game as a DH after being relieved from the mound. The "Ohtani rule" largely eliminates the disincentive against a good-hitting pitcher batting in the same game since it means relievers do not have to bat for themselves (or be replaced by pinch hitters) in games where the starting pitcher appears at the plate. Ohtani, who was 27 as of the start of the 2022 season, needed 38 home runs while pitching to officially break Ferrell's record. Per the terms of the "Ohtani rule," hitting statistics recorded by a batting pitcher after any defensive half-inning completed by him will be scored as being hit by a pitcher whether or not he returns to the mound to start the next defensive half-inning, but hitting statistics compiled after a reliever appears on the mound will not. As of September 2, 2025, Ohtani has 11 home runs as a pitcher.

=== Most career sacrifice bunts – 512 ===
Set by Eddie Collins, who successfully laid down 512 sacrifice bunts over his 25-year career with the Philadelphia Athletics. Second behind him is Jake Daubert with 392. Since the turn of the 20th century, sacrifice bunts have continually fallen further out of favor: Moneyball by Michael Lewis, the famous sabermetrician's guide, went as far as to label the bunt as "evil". Modern baseball teams value minimizing outs rather than moving a base-runner over a single base position.

Bunting has usually been attempted by players with limited hitting abilities. Usually pitchers in National League parks who, when required to bat, often attempted to advance baserunners as opposed to trying to reach base (and run the basepaths). However, there was no point in the post-19th century history of the game where pitchers played anywhere close to enough innings to have a realistic opportunity to challenge Collins' record. In modern baseball, position players generally only bunt in specific situations. The most obvious of these occurs in the bottom of the ninth or an extra inning where the home team is tied, has no outs and has the potential game-winning runner on first base. In such a scenario, the baserunner is almost always more likely to score a run (and win the game) if he is on second base with one out as opposed to being on first base with no outs.

At the end of the 2021 season the active leader in career sacrifice bunts, pitcher Clayton Kershaw, had 110 — which placed him outside the top 300 on the all-time list. With the NL adopting the DH in 2022, Kershaw never batted again before retiring at the end of the 2025 season. Among position players, the active leader is Nicky Lopez with 51.

== Baserunning ==
=== Most stolen bases in a season – 130 ===
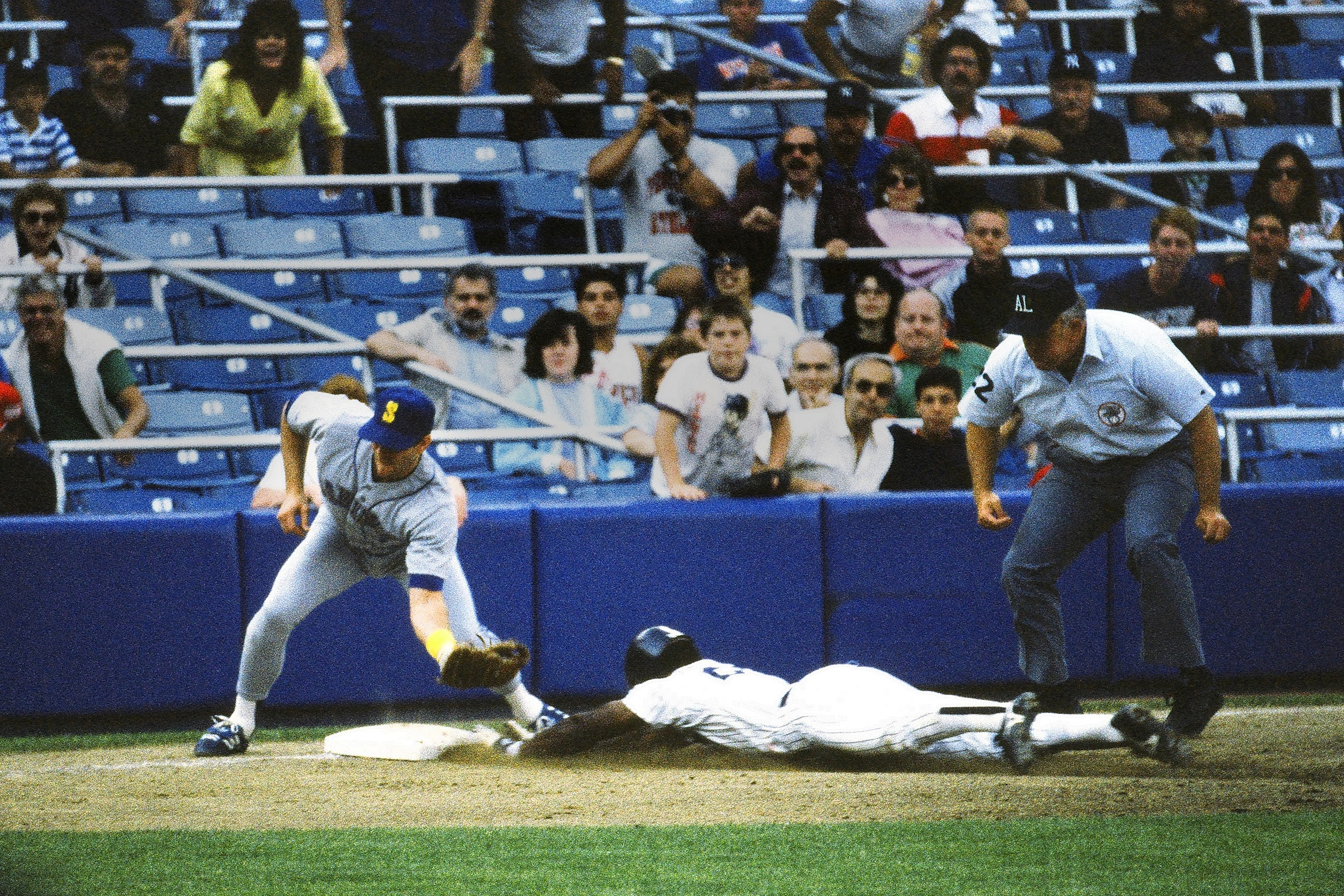
Rickey Henderson holds both the single season (130) and career stolen base records (1,406), both regarded as unlikely to be broken.

Set by Rickey Henderson with 130 in 1982, a season in which he was caught stealing 42 times. No player has even attempted 130 steals in a season since Vince Coleman in 1985, and base stealing steadily declined from the 1980s through the early 2020s. No player in the 2018 season even attempted one-third of Henderson's total attempts in 1982, and in the 2017 season, no American League player even attempted more than Henderson's 1982 caught-stealing total of 42. Additionally, while Billy Hamilton set a minor-league record with 155 steals in 2012, he has never stolen more than 60 in any season of his MLB career.

However, MLB rule changes in 2023 have led to a significant resurgence in base stealing—pitchers are now limited to two pickoff or step-back attempts per batter, and the size of first, second, and third bases was slightly increased, giving runners a marginally shorter path to a steal. Total steals in MLB went up by over 40% from 2022 to 2023, and increased again in 2024. Success rates in 2023 were the best in MLB history, and only declined slightly in 2024

=== Most career stolen bases – 1,406 ===
Set by Rickey Henderson, 1979–2003. Highlights include three 100-stolen-base seasons, thirteen 50-stolen-base seasons, and leading the league in stolen bases 12 times. The next closest player is Lou Brock, who has 468 fewer stolen bases at 938. According to LIFE, the stolen base record is probably unbreakable, as it is hard to imagine a player today who would "even attempt so many steals." For a player to approach Henderson's milestone, he would have to average 70 stolen bases over 20 seasons just to get to 1,400. Between 2000 and 2009, the Major League leader in stolen bases finished each year with an average of 64, and that number dropped to 57 in the 2010s—a decade in which no player stole 70 bases in a season. Ronald Acuña Jr.'s 73 stolen bases in 2023, coinciding with the aforementioned rule changes that aided base stealers, are the most in a season since 2007.

== Fielding ==
=== Most outfield assists in a season – 50 ===
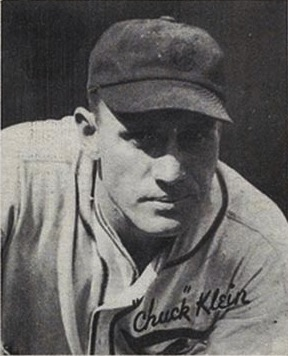
Phillies right-fielder Chuck Klein posted 44 assists in 1930 in Philadelphia's highly asymmetrical Baker Bowl

Set by Orator Shafer in 1879. Since 1900, no other player has had more than Chuck Klein's 44 in 1930, and nobody has had more than Boston Braves right-fielder Gene Moore's 32 since 1936.

=== Most outfield assists, career – 449 ===
Set by Hall of Famer Tris Speaker (1907–28). Speaker is regarded as one of the greatest fielding centerfielders ever, known for playing exceptionally shallow and going back on balls rather than coming in. Playing shallow in his era both erased a lot of hits and led to high assist totals: 14 seasons with more than 20 and four with more than 35. The closest any player has since come is 266 by Roberto Clemente (1955–1972).

=== Most errors, career – 1,096 ===
Herman Long holds the record with 1,096 career errors; he played from 1889 to 1904. Bill Dahlen, Deacon White and Germany Smith are the only other players to commit at least 1,000 errors during their MLB careers. All of these players played at least one season before 1900. The 20th-century record is held by Rabbit Maranville, with 711 errors, and the most among players whose entire careers were in the live-ball era is 672 by Luke Appling. Among active players, Javier Báez, who has played in MLB since 2014, leads with 174 career errors after the 2026 season.

The much greater frequency of errors in the game's early decades can be attributed at least as much to a significantly lower standard of equipment as to an inferior level of skill. In particular, gloves did not gain widespread acceptance until the end of the 19th century and remained primitive by modern standards for several decades thereafter. Also, baseballs themselves were far more expensive relative to inflation (and especially relative to club finances) compared to today. Furthermore, the rules strictly enforced today to prevent their adulteration did not exist in that era. Balls were only replaced when absolutely necessary, and as a result were much more difficult to handle and throw effectively.

== Other ==
=== Most All-Star Games played – 25; most seasons on an All-Star roster – 21 ===
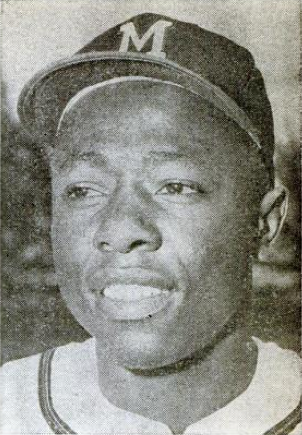
Hank Aaron's mark of 25 career All-Star games is highly unlikely to be matched, let alone broken.

Both records set by Hank Aaron, 1954–1976. Aaron was an All-Star in all but two of the 23 seasons he played in the major leagues (his debut year in 1954 and last season in 1976). His record total was aided by MLB's decision to hold two All-Star Games annually from 1959 to 1962; Aaron played in all eight All-Star Games during that period. His 21 seasons on an All-Star roster are also the most in MLB history. The only players whose careers began after 1976 who played in 25 MLB seasons were Rickey Henderson, who appeared in 10 All-Star Games, and Jamie Moyer, who appeared in one. The active player with the most All-Star Game selections is Mike Trout, who has been on 11 All-Star Game rosters after 13 seasons.

Aaron's record for most seasons on an All-Star roster is more approachable than his record for All-Star Game appearances. In addition to the aforementioned Henderson and Moyer, 26 players whose careers began after 1976, have played in at least 21 MLB seasons. However, the most All-Star seasons among these players is the 14 of Barry Bonds and Iván Rodríguez, who respectively played in 22 and 21 seasons. The most All-Star seasons among players whose careers began after 1976, is 19 by Cal Ripken Jr.

=== Most games played without a postseason appearance – 2,528 ===
Set by Ernie Banks, who played his entire Hall of Fame career with the Chicago Cubs from 1953 to 1971. During Banks' first 16 seasons (through 1968), the postseason consisted of only the World Series, with only the champions of each league participating. Even in his last three seasons, only two teams in each league made the postseason. Also, when Banks made his MLB debut, the Cubs had not played in the World Series since 1945, and did not make the postseason again until 1984.

Notably, Banks' career spanned the early expansion era in which the leagues expanded to ten teams each but the postseason format remained as it was before, resulting in a mere 10% of all teams reaching the postseason each season, the lowest such percentage ever in force in North American major professional sports. Moreover, the lack of free agency made it much more difficult for players to leave perennial also-rans for better teams. In contrast, 12 teams (6 from each league, or 40% of MLB) now participate in the postseason, still the lowest such percentage currently in force but much more similar to the other major sports leagues. Moreover, modern free agency rules give players much more opportunity to move to teams that can contend for postseason slots. Banks' record is thus likely unbreakable. When the 2024 Los Angeles Dodgers clinched a postseason berth on September 19 (a game also historically notable for Shohei Ohtani becoming the first MLB player with 50 homers and 50 stolen bases in the same season), it also effectively ensured Ohtani's first postseason appearance. Before the clinching game, Ohtani had played a then-MLB-leading 866 games without a postseason appearance, little more than a third of Banks' total.

The closest anyone has come to breaking Banks' record is Buddy Bell, who played in 2,405 games without a playoff appearance between 1972 and 1989, which is 4th all-time on the list (behind Luke Appling with 2,422 and Mickey Vernon with 2,409). Among players who played in the 21st century, Adam Dunn reached 2,001 games, with his teams never making the playoffs until his final season in 2014, as a member of the Oakland Athletics. However, those Athletics were eliminated in a single-game wild card round, and Dunn did not make an appearance in that game. No active player in 2026 has as many as 1,000 games played without a playoff appearance.

=== Most wins, losses, ties, and games managed – 3,731, 3,948, 76, and 7,755 ===
Set by Connie Mack, who retired in 1950. Mack owned the Philadelphia Athletics, and managed them for 50 years, until the age of 87. Shortly after his retirement Major League Baseball forbade owners from managing their teams. Mack also was the manager in 76 ties as he managed in an era where games could be called due to darkness and/or local curfews. As ties are now extremely rare as a result of rules changes, modern stadium lights, and much more lenient curfews (where they are in force at all) in MLB cities, this record is likely unbreakable given the current rules. Also, during baseball's early decades, owners who did not manage their own teams often sought to have a veteran player fill the role in order to reduce payroll costs. Such arrangements led to the "player-manager" position becoming relatively common in baseball and afforded greater opportunity to start a managerial career at a relatively young age.

Mack is also the oldest manager in MLB history – the only other person to manage in the majors after his eightieth birthday is Jack McKeon who retired shortly before his 81st birthday. Among managers active in 2023, the closest manager to Mack in games managed, wins, and losses is the 77-year-old Dusty Baker (3,884 games, 2,093 wins, 1,790 losses entering the 2023 season). The manager second to Mack in all three categories, Tony La Russa (5,393 games, 2,884 wins, 2,499 losses), returned to managing in 2021 at age 76 after a 10-year absence from that role, but took a medical leave during the 2022 season and later announced he would not return in 2023. Given that Baker ended the 2022 season with 10 fewer seasons as a manager than La Russa, he would have to manage into his eighties before challenging La Russa's totals, much less Mack's. The next-closest active manager in games, wins, and losses is Terry Francona (age 67), who entered the 2023 season with 3,460 games managed (18th), 1,874 wins (17th), and 1,586 losses (17th). Both Francona and Baker announced their retirement from managing after the 2023 season, although Francona returned in 2025 to manage the Cincinnati Reds.

Under the current 162-game schedule, a person would have to manage for 48 seasons to challenge Mack's records. Thus, for example, a person would have to manage continuously starting in the year he turned 32 to have a chance to reach 7,756 games before turning 80, and even then only if no seasons were significantly shortened and/or canceled due to labor disputes, public health emergencies and/or other extenuating circumstances. With the de facto elimination of the player-manager position (the last MLB player-manager was Pete Rose) and the increasing tendency of players who display the leadership qualities that warrant eventual consideration for employment as field managers also having longer playing careers, it is now uncommon for anyone to earn their first MLB managerial position prior to turning 40. The youngest two managers in MLB in the 21st century are Eric Wedge and A. J. Hinch, who were both 35 when they first managed in the majors.

=== Most road losses in a season – 101 ===
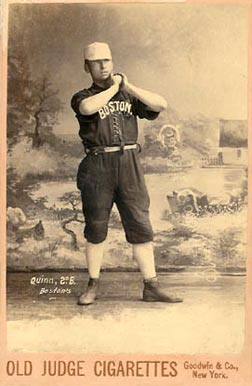
The 1899 Cleveland Spiders were so bad, the team was disbanded after the season. Their top hitter, Joe Quinn, batted .286 with 0 homers in 640 plate appearances.

The 1899 Cleveland Spiders (20–134) hold the MLB record for the most road losses in a single season, with 101. They were so bad – 20 wins below the 1962 New York Mets – they likely set an unbreakable record for fewest wins in a full season at the same time. In terms of absolute numbers the Spiders' record for fewest wins has been nominally "broken" by the 2020 Pittsburgh Pirates, who finished 19–41 in the pandemic-shortened sixty-game season.

What is unusual, however, about the Spiders' road loss record compared to others on this list is that while most others are theoretically possible (but impractical) to break, it cannot be broken even if a team achieved a completely winless season on the road: in today's sport, the 162-game season is equally divided between 81 home and road games, 21 fewer than needed to set a new mark.

Four other factors contribute to the unique nature of the Spiders' record:

- In the nineteenth century, owners were allowed to own more than one team. In 1898 the Spiders finished a respectable fifth in the NL, but dead last out of twelve teams in attendance at only 70,496 for the entire season. In contrast the St. Louis Browns (now Cardinals) were by far the worst team on the field but still drew respectable crowds by the standards of the time, especially considering the team's poor performance. Observing that the Browns had drawn 151,700 (more than double Cleveland's total), Spiders owners Frank and Stanley Robison decided it would be more profitable to have a good team in St. Louis. They purchased the Browns, renamed them the Perfectos and proceeded to brazenly trade the Spiders' best players from 1898 – including future Hall of Fame pitchers Cy Young, Jesse Burkett and Bobby Wallace – to the Perfectos in exchange for St. Louis' least desirable players, with their manager, Patsy Tebeau. From 1900, MLB rules have prohibited a single owner owning more than one team to avoid any repeat of this, or any similar, arrangements.
- Baseball teams in 1899 had gate receipts as their main source for revenue. Resigning themselves to the reality that fans in Cleveland were not going to pay to watch a decimated roster, the Spiders/Perfectos ownership transferred all of the Spiders' home games against the Perfectos to St. Louis. As the season wore on, the already-puny crowds in Cleveland shrank in response to mounting losses to a fraction of even their NL-worst 1898 numbers. In all 42 games played in 1899 in Cleveland the Spiders drew only 6,088 fans – an average of 145 per game. In response to the mounting fiasco, the other ten NL teams requested the Spiders transfer home games to their parks as well since their cut of the gate receipts would leave them unable to recoup the expenses of the journey. Since the Spiders' cut of the gate receipts for road games was far more lucrative than their gate receipts for home games, the Spiders' owners were not inclined to object to such requests. Thus, the Spiders only played eight home games after July 1, giving them the opportunity for 101 road losses (against 11 wins). Altogether, the Spiders played 112 road games during the season, a record that is unreachable under current scheduling practices.
  - Today, MLB revenue streams are far more numerous, while in the case of media rights are often both contractually dependent on teams playing their entire schedule, and are not affected by attendance, while travel expenses make up a much smaller portion of a team's budget. MLB rules also state any team that refuses to travel to their opponent's stadium for a scheduled game would immediately forfeit the game. The closest a team came to matching the Spiders 112 road games was when the Seattle Mariners had to play the remainder of their season on the road in 1994 due to a ceiling break at the Kingdome. The Mariners were to play 118 road games, but they only played 68 before the 1994-95 MLB strike cancelled the rest of the season prematurely, preventing them from breaking the record.
- In the nineteenth century, NL scouting practices were rudimentary by modern standards and the modern minor league farm system did not exist in its present form. Technology was certainly one limiting factor – at the end of the 19th century, the railroad and telegraph were the most advanced forms of transportation and communication respectively in common everyday use. NL club management thus often had little knowledge of prospects playing in other leagues besides perhaps those playing relatively nearby. Notwithstanding technological limitations however, scouting and recruiting efforts were essentially limited to the United States, with the enforcement of the color barrier limiting the NL's potential talent pool even further. While NL clubs did cultivate relationships with teams in other leagues, procuring players from them often involved contentious negotiations with teams in autonomous leagues that (at best) grudgingly accepted NL pre-eminence (indeed, it was resentment of the NL's attempts to dominate combined with the contraction of the Spiders and three other teams that directly led to the formation of the American League). While NL owners sometimes tried to overcome this by acquiring financial interests in "minor league" clubs, even under those arrangements they could, under certain circumstances, be willing to forego whatever rights they had to move such a team's best players to the NL – this was especially common if the "minor league" team was in its own pennant race and/or doing reasonably well at the gate. In any case, there is no evidence that the owners of the Spiders, after deciding to strip its roster of the best players, made any effort to replace them (say, by trying to purchase the contracts of potentially better players in other leagues). Instead, they compelled the Cleveland team to play the 1899 season with the roster they had. The end result was a team worse than the likely relative result of a 21st century MLB organization going as far as trading away its entire major league roster (and/or letting the whole roster leave via free agency) then signing only replacement-level players willing to play for the MLB minimum salary.
- In spite of the aforementioned circumstances, the 1899 Spiders still managed to play their entire 154-game schedule – an unusual occurrence in an era when cancellations and ties were much more frequent, and the affected games were often not made up.

The 1899 Spiders also hold the records for the most losses in a single MLB season (with 134) and lowest winning percentage (.130). While these are technically possible to break, even under a 162-game schedule only four teams have come within 15 losses of the record, these being the expansion 1962 New York Mets (40–120, .250 winning percentage), the 2003 Detroit Tigers (43–119, .265 winning percentage), the 2024 Chicago White Sox (41–121, .253 winning percentage), and the 2025 Colorado Rockies (43–119, .265 winning percentage).

Since 1899, only six teams have recorded a winning percentage under .260 (i.e., less than double that of the 1899 Spiders), with the 1962 Mets and 2024 White Sox being the only teams to do so under a 162-game schedule. Excluding the possibility of shortened seasons and/or canceled games not being made up, a team would need to lose 141 games over a 162-game season to record a .130 winning percentage (this yields a .129 winning percentage if the traditional rounding to three decimal places is ignored).
