= Kerry Wood =

American baseball player (born 1977)

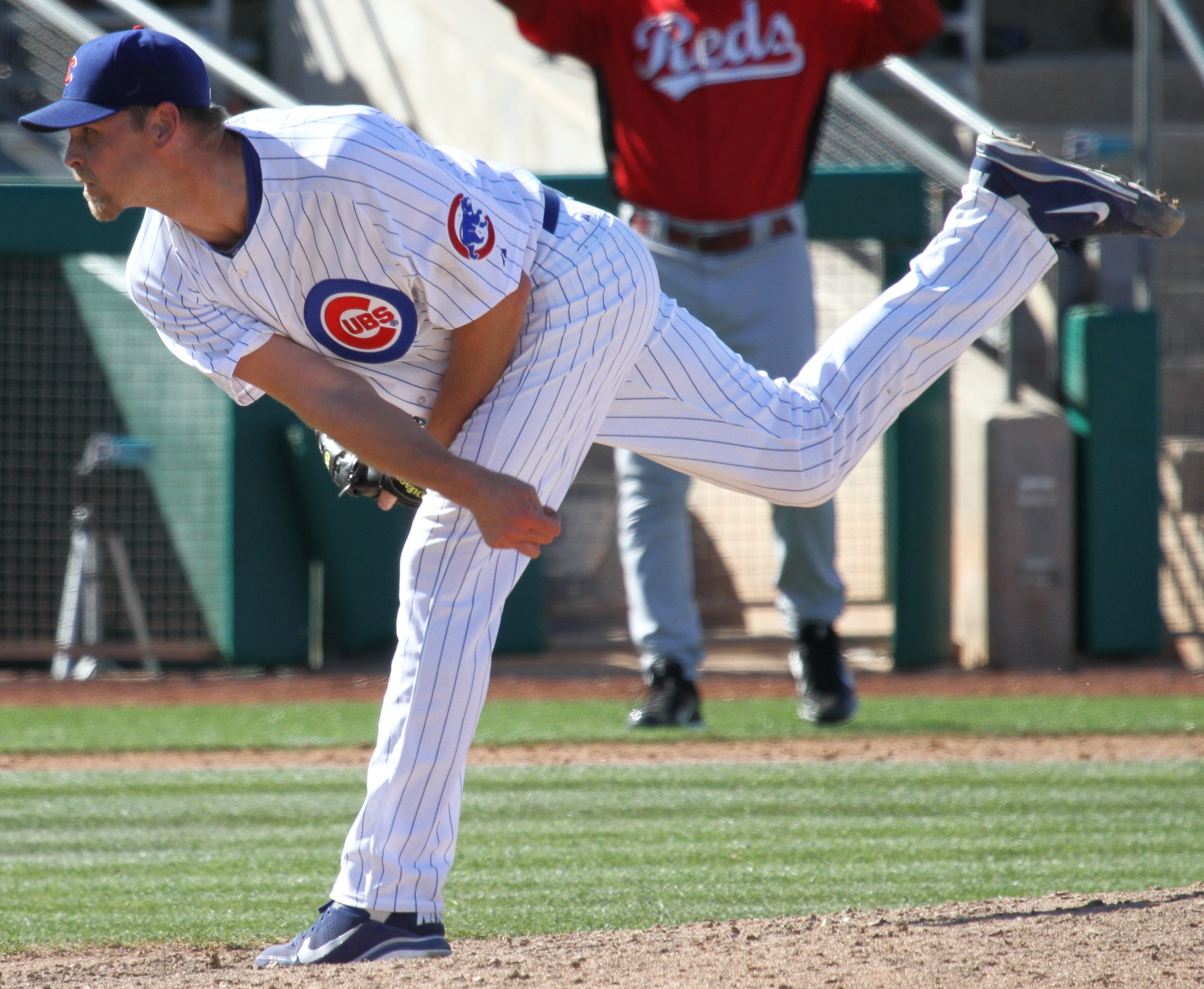
- Wood pitching for the Cubs in 2012
- Pitcher
- Born: June 16, 1977 (age 49); Irving, Texas, U.S.
- Batted: Right Threw: Right

MLB debut
- April 12, 1998, for the Chicago Cubs

Last MLB appearance
- May 18, 2012, for the Chicago Cubs

MLB statistics
- Win–loss record: 86–75
- Earned run average: 3.67
- Strikeouts: 1,582
- Saves: 63
- Stats at Baseball Reference

Teams
- Chicago Cubs (1998, 2000–2008); Cleveland Indians (2009–2010); New York Yankees (2010); Chicago Cubs (2011–2012)

Career highlights and awards
- 2× All-Star (2003, 2008); NL Rookie of the Year (1998); NL strikeout leader (2003); MLB record 20 strikeouts in a nine-inning game; Chicago Cubs Hall of Fame

Kerry Lee Wood (born June 16, 1977) is an American former baseball pitcher who played 14 seasons in Major League Baseball (MLB) for the Chicago Cubs, Cleveland Indians, and New York Yankees. Wood first came to prominence as a 20-year-old rookie, when he recorded 20 strikeouts in a one-hit shutout against the Houston Astros, which some have argued may be the greatest single-game pitching performance in MLB history. The game also made Wood the co-holder of the MLB record for strikeouts in a single game (20) and earned Wood the nickname "Kid K". He was later named the 1998 National League Rookie of the Year.

Wood went on to record over 200 strikeouts in four out of his first five seasons, with a high of 266 in 2003. He holds several MLB strikeout records. Though he struggled with injuries throughout his career, Wood was twice named an All-Star. Wood transitioned to a relief pitcher in 2007 due to continued struggles with injuries, ultimately reviving his career as a closer. During his career, Wood was placed on the disabled list 14 times in 14 major league seasons, which included missing the entire 1999 season due to Tommy John surgery. After a slow start to the 2012 season, Wood retired on May 18, 2012.

== Early life ==
Wood attended MacArthur High School in Irving, Texas, for his first three seasons of high-school baseball. He continued his education at Grand Prairie High School for his final season as a high-school player. As a senior, Wood went 14-0 with a 0.77 ERA and 159 strikeouts in 81 innings, and was named All-American and Texas 5A Player of the Year. Wood was high-school teammates with Kevin Walker. He initially committed to play college baseball at McLennan Community College in Waco.

== Professional career ==
=== Chicago Cubs ===
==== 1995–1998 ====
The Chicago Cubs drafted Wood as the fourth overall selection in the 1995 Major League Baseball draft. Two days after being drafted, he started both ends of a doubleheader in the Texas state playoffs, throwing 175 pitches between the two games; the Cubs were outraged. He split his first professional season between the GCL Cubs and the Williamsport Cubs of the New York-Penn League.

Ranked as the 16th best prospect in baseball by Baseball America in 1996, he pitched to a 2.91 ERA with 136 strikeouts in 22 starts for the Daytona Cubs of the Florida State League. He was also considered the top prospect in the league and the Cubs organization. In 1997, Baseball America ranked Wood as the third best player in the game, behind only Andruw Jones and Vladimir Guerrero. He played for the Orlando Rays in Double-A and the Iowa Cubs in Triple-A. Wood also began the 1998 season in the minors, striking out 11 batters in a single five-inning start.

==== 1998 ====
Wood made his first appearance in the major leagues on April 12, 1998. In his fifth career start, on May 6, he threw a one-hit, no-walk, 20-strikeout shutout against the Houston Astros in Wrigley Field, tying Roger Clemens's record for strikeouts in a nine-inning game and breaking Bill Gullickson's single-game rookie record of 18 strikeouts in 1980. Wood allowed only two baserunners: Ricky Gutiérrez on an infield single and Craig Biggio, who was hit by a pitch with a count of one ball and two strikes. (Biggio had led the league in that category each of the previous three years and is second all-time in hit-by-pitches with 285.) Only seven balls reached fair territory. The Astros went on to lead the league in on-base percentage, and all of the regulars who were in the lineup, including the four who finished the season batting over .300, went hitless. The performance garnered a game score of 105 – the highest number ever calculated for a pitcher in a nine-inning game.

Wood finished the 1998 season with a 13–6 record; despite missing the last month of the season with elbow soreness, he easily won the National League Rookie of the Year award. He pitched one game in the playoffs, losing against the Atlanta Braves.

==== 1999–2003 ====
During spring training of 1999, he tore his ulnar collateral ligament (UCL). Wood underwent successful Tommy John surgery to repair damage to the UCL in his right elbow, and missed the entire 1999 season. Wood returned in 2000 and had an 8–7 record, but the following season, he returned to form. In 2001, Wood went 12–6 with a 3.36 ERA. He recorded a one-hit, 14-strikeout complete-game shutout on May 25, 2001. On August 3, 2001, he struck out nine batters and gave up only one run over eight innings to defeat Chan Ho Park and the Los Angeles Dodgers 2-1 to extend the Cubs' lead in National League Central to 3.5 games. The following season, Wood finished 12–11 with a 3.67 ERA, and did not miss a start all year long, setting career highs with 213.6 innings pitched and 33 starts. He had 217 strikeouts in both seasons.

In 2003, Wood set career highs with 266 strikeouts, 14 wins (as part of a 14–11 record), a 3.20 ERA, and two shutouts. He threw the fastest fastball in the majors among starters, averaging 95.4 miles per hour. He also walked 100 batters and surrendered 24 home runs, also career highs, but was selected as a National League All-Star and helped lead the Cubs to the playoffs as one half of "Chicago Heat" along with fellow pitcher Mark Prior.

Wood earned two wins in the Divisional Series against the Atlanta Braves and was the starter in Game 3 of the 2003 National League Championship Series, which the Cubs won in extra innings. However, the Cubs lost in seven games to the eventual World Series champion Florida Marlins. In the decisive Game 7, Wood hit the first home run by a pitcher in an NLCS game since another Cub, Rick Sutcliffe, did so in Game 1 in 1984. However, the Marlins won the game 9-6. Wood was the losing pitcher and the Cubs were eliminated.

==== 2004–2006 ====
Wood went 8-9 during the 2004 season and was sidelined for nearly two months with a strained triceps. In 2005, Wood continued to struggle. On August 31, 2005, Wood underwent surgery and missed the remainder of the season. During spring training in 2006, Wood suffered several injuries that required an additional surgery (on his knee). On May 18, 2006, Wood returned to the Cubs' pitching rotation when he started and lost a home game against the Washington Nationals. In June, Wood returned to the disabled list (DL) with a sore shoulder. The following month, the Cubs announced that Wood had sustained a partially torn rotator cuff, which was likely to keep him from pitching again for the rest of the year. At the end of the 2006 season, the Cubs exercised their option on Wood's contract and bought out the remaining $13M.

==== 2007–2008 ====
With his long history of injuries and inability to stay in the starting rotation, Wood accepted the Cubs' offer to return as a relief pitcher in 2007. Wood attempted to sustain a regular throwing schedule and appearances during spring training games. Wood was placed on the 15-day DL, though, with soreness in his elbow, and was then moved to the 60-day DL. Wood considered retiring if he continued to have pain in his throwing arm. He began playing catch on May 21. In his first rehabilitation assignment in Cubs Rookie Ball, he struck out all three batters he faced. On July 24, he pitched an inning with the Single-A Peoria Chiefs, throwing 9 pitches. He made back-to-back appearances on July 26 and July 27, throwing his fastball between 92 and 94 mph with no discomfort.

The Cubs activated Wood from the 60-day DL on August 3, causing many to believe that he would make his actual return on that day. In the seventh inning, however, Lou Piniella opted to send Bob Howry to the mound, and most fans, eager to see Kerry back on the hill, mistakenly gave Howry a standing ovation, only to realize moments later he was actually not Wood. Piniella later stated he wanted Wood to receive a "softer landing", or in other words, make his return in a game where the Cubs have a comfortable lead over their opponents. Wood made his return on August 5, with the Cubs trailing the New York Mets by four runs. He pitched a single inning, during which he allowed one hit and struck out another batter. Piniella praised Wood's performance, stating, "He threw the ball real good", and "His breaking ball had some bite to it, and he threw it up there about 93–94, about what we expected". He remained healthy appearing in 22 games and posting a 1–1 record with a solid 3.33 ERA.

Wood was generally limited to one inning per outing, not appearing in games on back-to-back days, though he did pitch in both halves of a doubleheader on September 15. Wood was a major contributor to the Cubs' NL Central Division Championship down the stretch in late September, earning a win and eight holds. Wood filed for free agency on November 11, 2007, though he suggested that he wanted to remain in pinstripes for the 2008 season. Despite multiyear offers from other teams, Wood agreed to a one-year, $4.2 million deal with the Cubs.

Wood, along with Bob Howry and Carlos Mármol, competed for the role as the Cubs' closer after Ryan Dempster was moved to the starting rotation. After posting a 2.84 ERA in the spring, Wood won the job. He recorded his first career save April 3, 2008, with a win over the Brewers. Wood recorded 34 saves in 39 opportunities, 82 strike-outs, and a 1.12 WHIP. He was selected to the 2008 MLB All-Star Game as a relief pitcher on July 6, 2008, along with six other teammates.

Wood was placed on the 15-day DL on July 24, 2008, with a blister on his right index finger.

On November 13, 2008, after acquiring closer Kevin Gregg from the Florida Marlins, Cubs general manager Jim Hendry announced that the organization did not plan to re-sign Wood. He had previously requested a multiyear contract with the team, but was deferred due to financial reasons. Wood stated he wished to remain with the Cubs, but also wanted to continue playing baseball.

=== Cleveland Indians ===
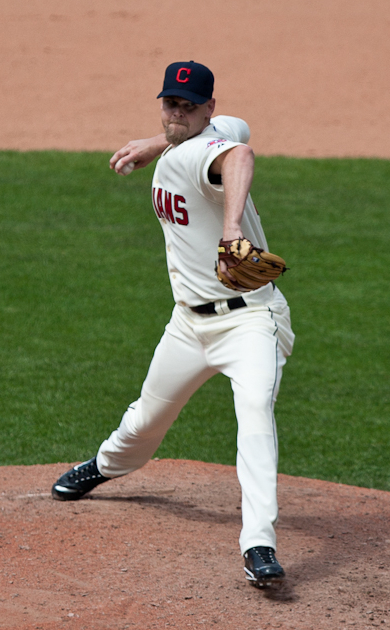
Wood pitching for the Cleveland Indians in 2010.

On December 13, 2008, Wood signed a two-year contract with the Cleveland Indians.

Cubs fans showed their appreciation for him by giving him a standing ovation when the Indians played at Wrigley Field on June 19, 2009. During the 2010 season, Wood was placed on the disabled list until May 8 due to an upper back muscle strain. On July 17, 2010, Wood was placed on the disabled list for the 14th time in his major league career, this time due to a blister on his right index finger.

=== New York Yankees ===
Wood was traded from the Cleveland Indians to the New York Yankees on July 31, 2010, for Andrew Shive, Matt Cusick, and cash. With the Yankees, he went 2–0 with a 0.69 ERA in 24 games, including 21 straight scoreless appearances, and served as the bridge to Mariano Rivera in the 2010 postseason. During the 2010 postseason, Wood had a 2.25 ERA, appearing in seven games overall. The Yankees won the 2010 ALDS against the Minnesota Twins in three games, but lost to the Texas Rangers in 6 games of the 2010 ALCS.

The Yankees announced on October 27 that the club had declined to exercise their option for Wood for 2011.

=== Chicago Cubs (second stint) ===
On December 16, 2010, Wood agreed to a one-year deal worth $1.5 million with the Cubs. Wood reportedly turned down offers for long-term deals from several other teams worth more money due to his desire to keep his family in Chicago. Wood re-signed with the Cubs on January 13, 2012, for a one-year, $3 million deal with a team option for 2013.

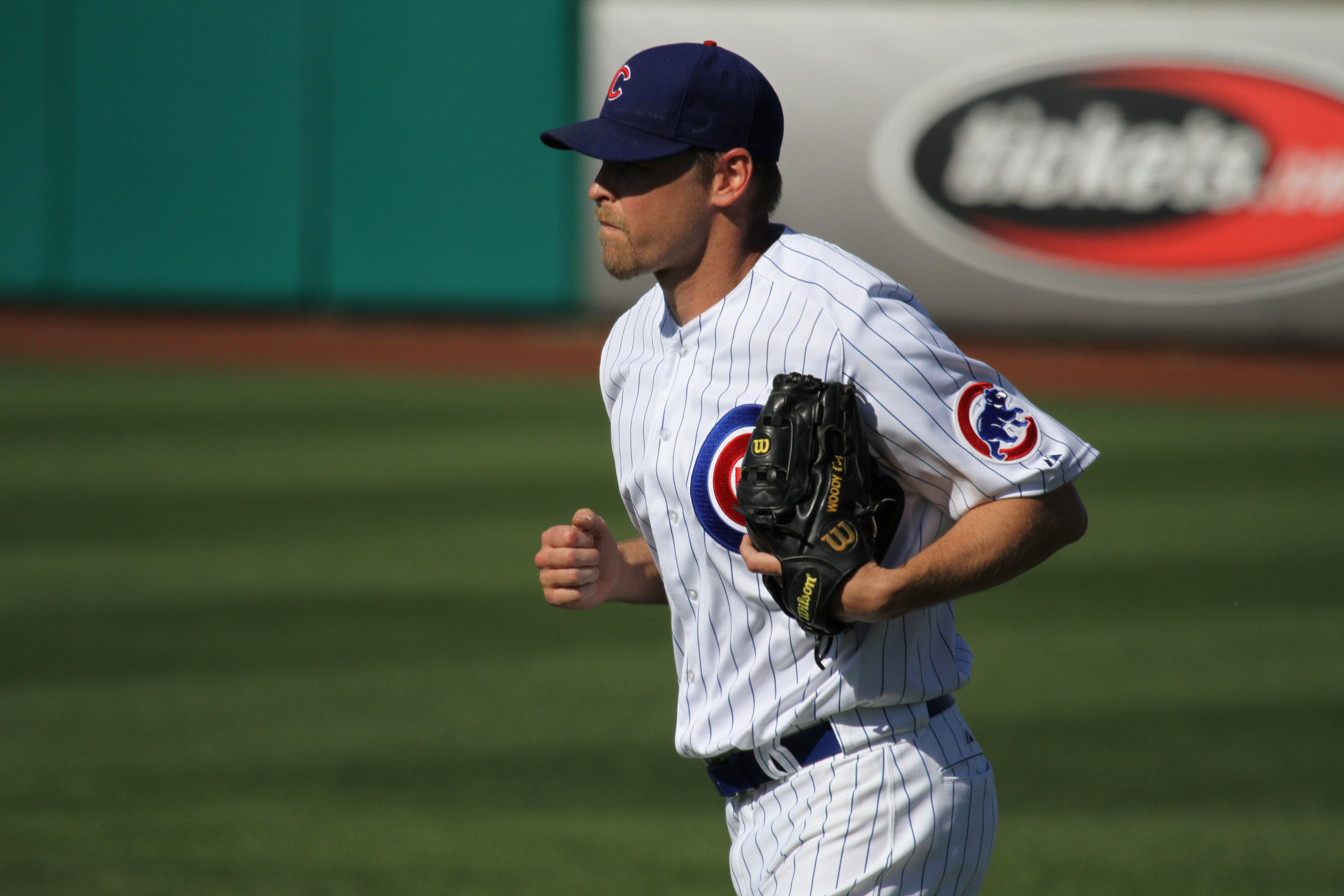
Wood entering a game in spring training 2012

Plagued by arm issues and a soaring ERA, Wood retired on May 18, 2012, striking out the only (and therefore final) batter he faced, Dayán Viciedo of the Chicago White Sox. The fans at Wrigley Field gave Wood a long standing ovation as his son, Justin, ran out to greet him as he exited the field. On his baseball career: "I had fun, I had a blast", Wood said. "I wouldn't trade anything in."

=== MLB records ===
- Fastest to reach 1,000 strikeouts in MLB history (in appearances): 134 games
- Fastest to reach 1,000 strikeouts in MLB history (in innings pitched): 853 IP
- Strikeouts in a nine-inning game: 20 on May 6, 1998 (tied record held by Roger Clemens, who accomplished it twice; Max Scherzer tied the record in 2016)

== Personal life ==
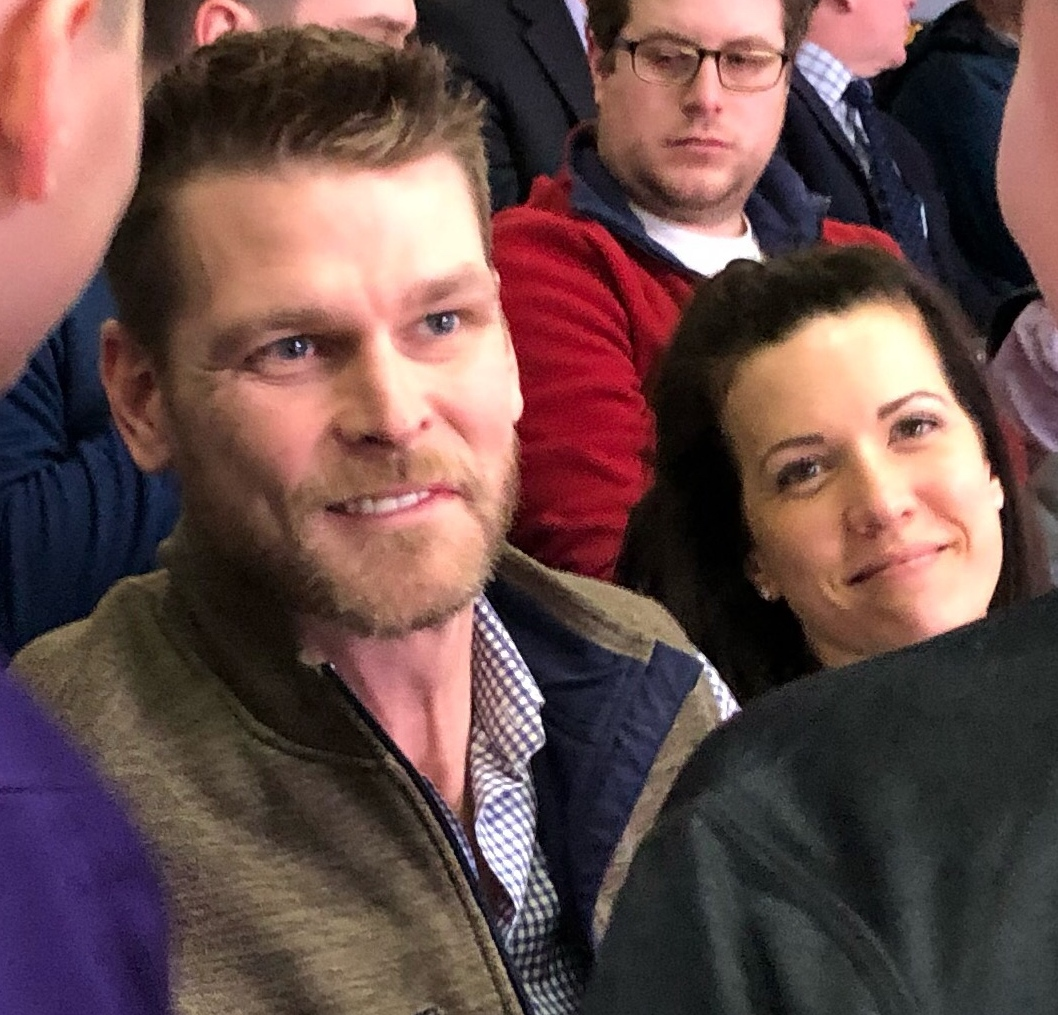
Wood (left) and his wife at Welsh–Ryan Arena in 2019

On February 13, 1999, Wood and former high-school teammate Kevin Walker were ticketed for urinating in a parking lot at 1:10 am in Scottsdale, Arizona. Wood missed his initial court appearance and an arrest warrant was issued. He later pleaded guilty and paid a fine of $90.

Wood is married to Sarah Pates of Waukegan, Illinois. The couple has one son, Justin, and two daughters, Katie and Charlotte. Until 2008, the family resided in the Old Town neighborhood of Chicago.

While playing for the Cubs, the Woods hosted a celebrity bowling tournament called Kerry Wood's Strike Zone, which also featured a silent auction that raised over $2 million.

On June 24, 2013, while paddleboarding in waters in Chicago, Wood happened upon a corpse floating in Belmont Harbor. He immediately reported the discovery to local authorities, who determined the deceased to be a 40-year-old man who had been reported missing by a North Side nursing home days earlier.

== See also ==
- List of Major League Baseball annual strikeout leaders
- List of Major League Baseball single-game strikeout leaders
- List of Major League Baseball single-inning strikeout leaders

Awards and achievements
| Preceded by Nomar Garciaparra | Baseball America Rookie of the Year; 1998 | Succeeded by Carlos Beltrán |
| Preceded by Scott Rolen | Players Choice NL Most Outstanding Rookie; 1998 | Succeeded by Preston Wilson |
| Preceded by Pedro Martínez; A. J. Burnett | Fewerst hits per nine innings (NL); 1998; 2003 | Succeeded by Kevin Millwood; Randy Johnson |
Sporting positions
| Preceded by Jon Lieber | Chicago Cubs Opening Day starting pitcher 2003–2004 | Succeeded by Carlos Zambrano |
