= Cleveland Blues (NL) all-time roster =

List of baseball players

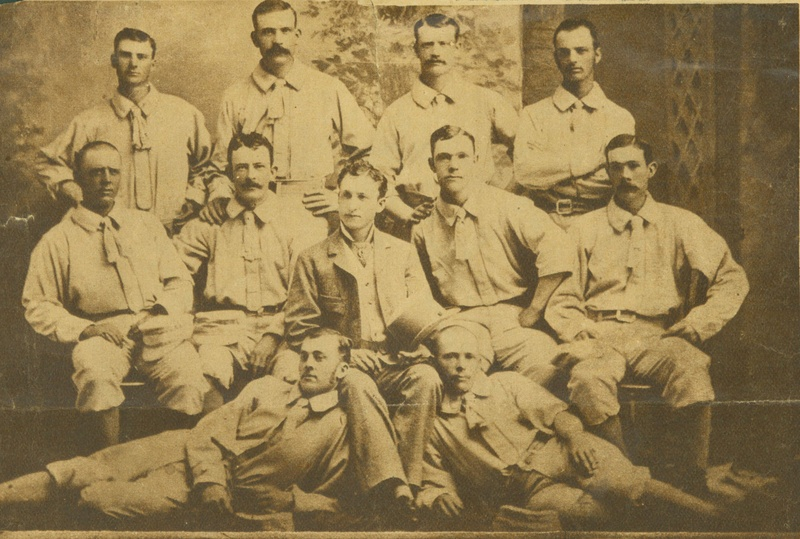
The 1879 Cleveland Blues baseball team

The Cleveland Blues were a professional baseball franchise that operated in the National League (NL), a "major" league, from 1879 until 1884. They were organized by businessmen William Hollinger, and J. Ford Evans in 1878 as the Forest Citys, and played a season as an independent team. The NL expanded from six teams to eight before the 1879 season, and the Forest Citys accepted an invitation to join the league. Evans became their president and stayed in that capacity until C. H. Bulkeley assumed the role in 1882. In their six seasons in the NL, the team never finished higher than third place in the standings. They played their home games in League Park.

For their first season in the NL, the franchise (now named the Blues due to their dark blue uniforms) employed Jim McCormick as the manager as well as the ace of their pitching staff. Cleveland did not fare well, winning just 27 games against 55 losses, with a league-low .223 batting average. The 1880 season was better, however, as the team increased its win total to 47 against 37 losses and a tie, McCormick winning a league-leading 45 of those victories. Over the next two seasons, the team changed the on-field leadership often; employing Mike McGeary and John Clapp as player-managers in 1881, and Fred Dunlap in 1882. The changes did not prove effective as the team was unable to finish higher than fifth place during that span. The team had their best record and highest win total in 1883 under manager Frank Bancroft. On September 13, 1883, Hugh Daily threw the franchise's lone no-hitter.

An upstart baseball league was created in 1884 by Henry Lucas called the Union Association (UA). Several member of the Blues' signed contracts with teams in the UA despite being subject to the reserve clause: including star players McCormick, Dunlap, and Jack Glasscock. These moves caused the Blues to become financially unstable. However, the franchise was able to secure a deal with the league for a better share of gate receipts. This deal was not enough for the franchise to profit, and Bulkeley sold the team to Lucas for $2,500 ($73,820 current dollar adjustment) following the conclusion of the 1884 season.

== Players ==
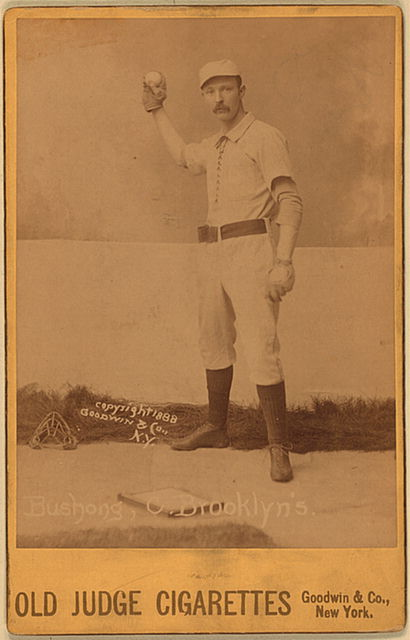
Doc Bushong was the Blues' starting catcher in 1883 and 1884.

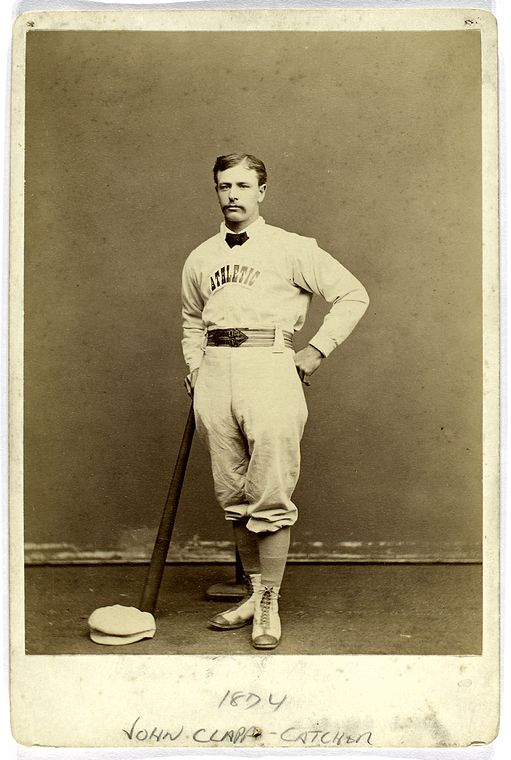
John Clapp was the player-manager of the 1883 Blues.

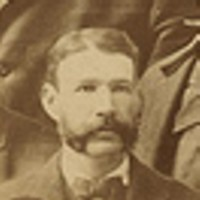
Hugh Daily pitched the only no-hitter in franchise history.

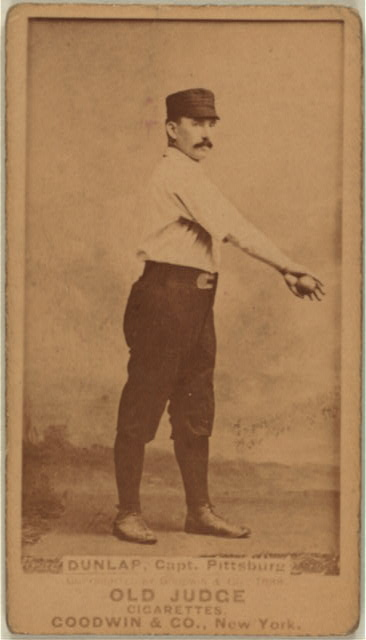
Fred Dunlap was the player-manager of the 1882 Blues.

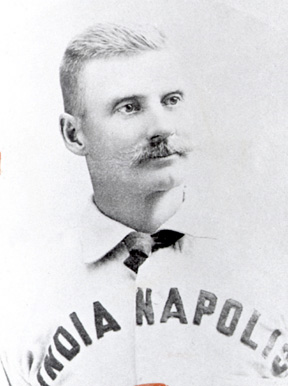
Jack Glasscock played in each of the Blues' seasons.

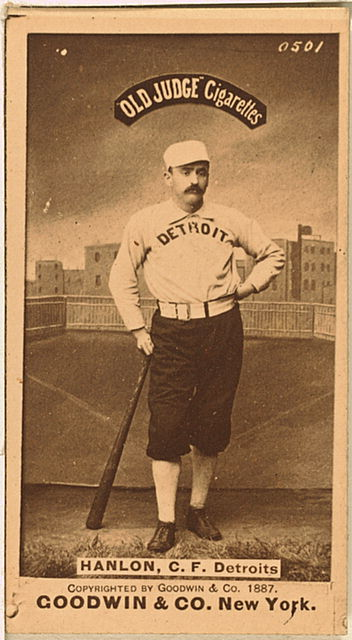
Hall of Fame manager Ned Hanlon began his playing career with the 1880 team.

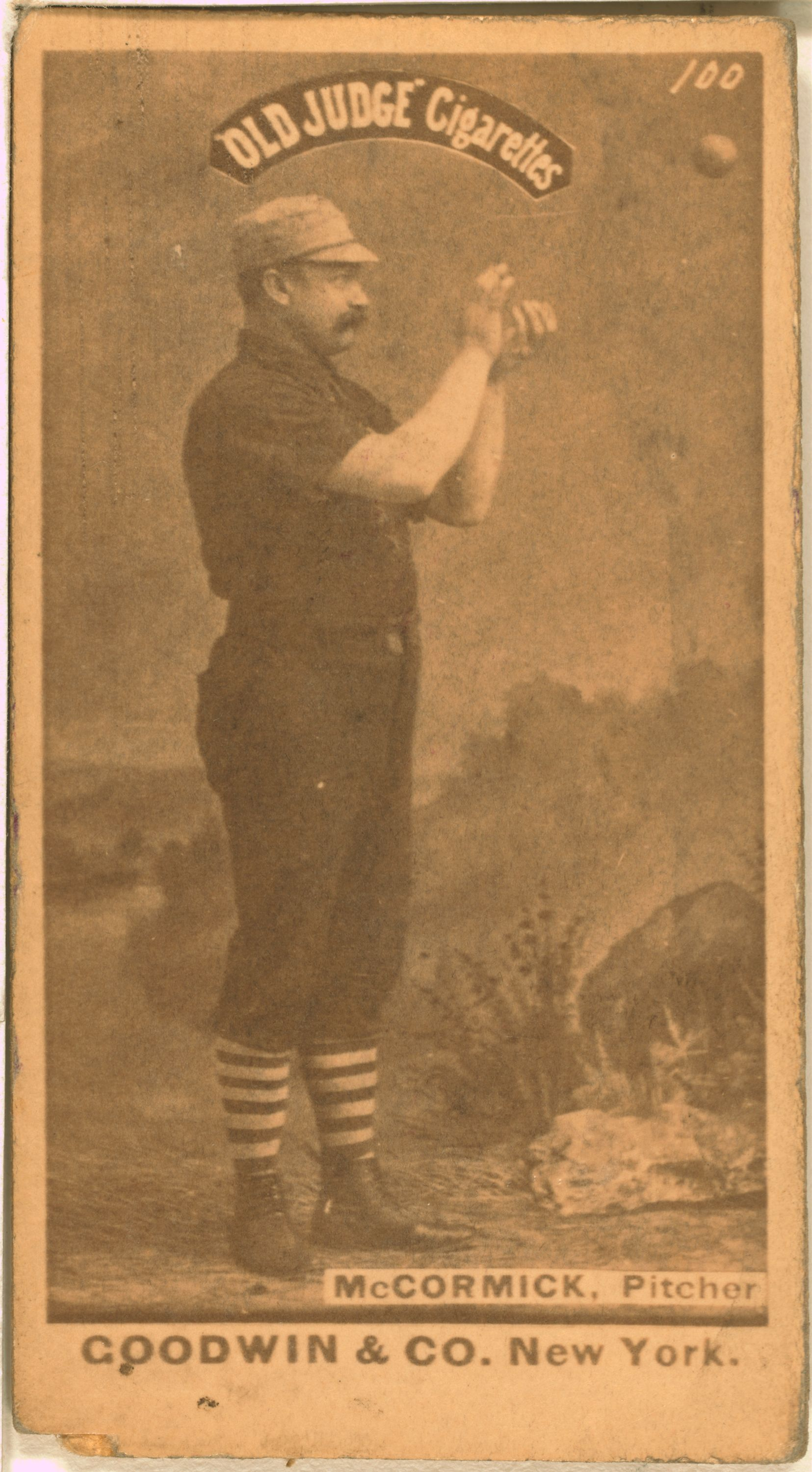
Jim McCormick was the franchise's all-time leader in pitching wins with 174, and was the team's player-manager from 1879 to 1880.

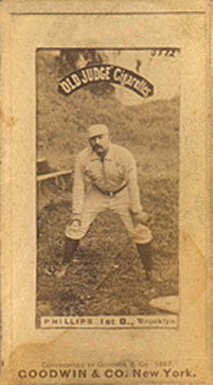
Bill Phillips was the franchise's all-time leader in most batting categories.

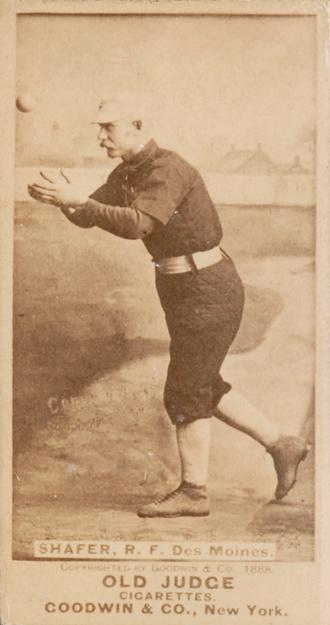
Orator Shafer was the franchise's starting right fielder for three seasons.

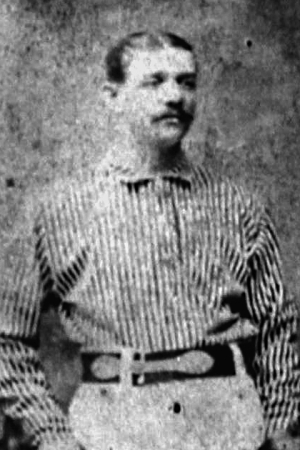
Tom York led the league in most games played by a left fielder in 1883.

Key to symbols in player table
§	Player was a player-manager
†	Inducted into the National Baseball Hall of Fame and Museum

Players who have played for the Cleveland Blues, primary position played, and season(s) played for franchise
Player	Position(s)	Season(s)	Notes	Ref
Jack Allen	Third baseman	1879	Allen played in 16 games for the Blues after having been released by the Syracuse Stars in June. This was his only season at the major league level.	
Joe Ardner	Second baseman	1884	Playing behind Germany Smith, Ardner had just a .174 batting average in 26 games played.	
George Bradley	Utility player / Pitcher	1881–1883	Once a star pitcher in the mid-to-late 1870s, Bradley played various positions in the field and only occasionally as a relief pitcher. In June 1883, he was sold to the Philadelphia Athletics.	
Fatty Briody	Catcher	1882–1884	Briody was the Blues' starting catcher in 1882, then became their back-up when Doc Bushong assumed the role.	
Cal Broughton	Catcher	1883	Beginning his major league career with the Blues, he had a .200 batting average in four games. He finished the season with the Baltimore Orioles.	
Ernie Burch	Left fielder	1884	Burch began his major league career with the Blues in 1884, playing 32 games. Two seasons later, he became the Brooklyn Grays' every-day left fielder.	
Doc Bushong	Catcher	1883–1884	In his two seasons with the Blues, Bushong was their starting catcher.	
Charlie Cady	Right fielder / Pitcher	1883	Cady played in three games for the Blues, two as their right fielder and one as a pitcher. He collected no hits in 11 at bats, and was credited with the loss in his only pitching appearance.	
Tom Carey	Shortstop	1879	In Carey's final major league season, he had a .239 batting average as the team's starting shortstop.	
John Clapp^{§}	Catcher	1883	He was the player-manager of the 1883 Blues team, his only season with the franchise.	
Bill Crowley	Right fielder	1883	Crowley came to the team late in the 1883 season and he had a .293 batting average in 11 games played.	
Hugh Daily	Pitcher	1883	In Daily's only season with the Blues, he had a 23–19 win–loss record and a 2.42 earned run average. On September 13, he pitched the only no-hitter in the franchise's history.	
Herm Doscher	Third baseman	1881–1882	He played his final two seasons at the major league level with the Blues as their back-up third baseman. He later became an umpire, and his son, Jack Doscher, also played in the majors.	
Fred Dunlap^{§}	Second baseman	1880–1883	Dunlap played the first four of his twelve seasons in the majors with the Blues, and was their player-manager in 1882. He led the league in doubles in 1880. As a fielder he twice led the league in assists and double plays.	
John Dwyer	Utility player	1882	Dwyer played in just one major league game. He collect no hits in three at bats.	
Charlie Eden	Right fielder	1879	In Eden's only season with the team, he led the league in doubles and in games played by a right fielder.	
Dude Esterbrook	Left fielder	1882	Esterbrook had a .246 batting average in 45 games playing mainly in left field.	
Jake Evans	Right fielder	1883–1884	Evans played two seasons as the Blues' regular right fielder, and in 1884, he led the league's outfielders with .917 fielding percentage.	
George Fisher	Second baseman	1884	In six games for the Blues, he had a .125 batting average.	
Gid Gardner	Pitcher	1880	Although he played mostly as an outfielder during his career, he pitched in nine games for the Blues in 1880, and had a 1–8 win–loss record and a 2.57 earned run average.	
Barney Gilligan	Catcher / Left fielder	1879–1880	In his two seasons with the Blues, Gilligan had batting averages of .171 and .172, while playing mostly catcher his first season, and in left field during his second.	
Pit Gilman	Left fielder	1884	In 10 major-league at bats, Gilman had just one hit for a .100 batting average.	
Jack Glasscock	Second baseman	1879–1884	Played in each season of the Blues' existence. He played different infield positions in 1879 until settling in as their starting second baseman from 1880 until joining the Cincinnati Outlaw Reds of the Union Association during the 1884 season. Led the league in several fielding categories, including fielding percentage twice.	
Fred Gunkle	Catcher	1884	Gunkle played one game at the major league level, and did not have a hit in three at bats.	
Al Hall	Left fielder	1880	In his second, and last, season in the major leagues, Hall played in three games, and had a .125 batting average.	
Frank Hankinson	Third baseman	1880	Hankinson played mainly as the team's third baseman, but played sparingly in the outfield and as pitcher.	
Ned Hanlon^{†}	Left fielder	1880	In the first season of his Hall of Fame career, Hanlon was the Blues' starting left fielder and had a .246 batting average in 73 games played.	
John Harkins	Pitcher / Outfielder	1884	In his first season at the major league level, Harkins led the league in pitching losses, hits allowed and wild pitches.	
John Henry	Pitcher / Outfielder	1884	Henry played in nine games for the Blues; he had a 1–4 win–loss record in five games started, and had a .154 batting average in 26 at bats.	
Sonny Hoffman	Catcher	1879	Hoffman's entire career consisted of two games, and he had no hits in six at bats.	
Pete Hotaling	Center fielder	1883–1884	As the team's starting center fielder, Hotaling led the league with 100 games played in 1883.	
Lem Hunter	Right fielder / Pitcher	1883	Hunter played in one major league game.	
John Kelly	Catcher	1879, 1882	Kelly played in one game for the 1879 team, then later reappeared with the Blues for the 1882 season.	
Rudy Kemmler	Catcher	1881	Kemmler played in one game for the Blues.	
Doc Kennedy	Catcher	1879–1882	Kennedy was the team's starting catcher in both 1879 and 1880. He became Fatty Briody's back-up in 1881.	
Jim McCormick^{§}	Pitcher	1879–1884	McCormick was the franchise's all-time leader in most pitching statistical categories. Of his 265 career pitching wins, 174 of them were with the Blues. Twice he led the league in pitching wins; 45 in 1880 and 36 in 1882. He was the team's player-manager in both 1879 and 1880, as well as a short stint in 1882.	
Mike McGeary	Third baseman	1881	In 11 games for the Blues, McGeary had a .220 batting average in 41 at bats.	
Bill McGunnigle	Center fielder	1882	McGunnigle played in one game for the Blues in 1882; the final game of his playing career.	
Bobby Mitchell	Pitcher	1879	In the last full season of his career, Mitchell pitched in 23 games and had a 7–15 win–loss record.	
Sam Moffet	Pitcher	1884	In Moffet's first, and only, full season at the major league level, he had a 3–19 win–loss record in 24 games pitched.	
Jerry Moore	Catcher	1884	Moore played in nine games for the Blues in 1884 before finishing the season with Altoona Mountain City of the Union Association.	
Mike Moynahan	Left fielder	1881, 1884	Moynahan had a .230 batting average in 33 games played for the 1881 Blues, then later returned to the team in 1884 for 12 more.	
Mike Muldoon	Third baseman	1882–1884	In 1882, Muldoon split his playing time between third base and the outfield, then settled in as the team's starting third baseman for the 1883 and 1884 seasons.	
Willie Murphy	Left fielder	1884	Murphy played in one major league season, and in 46 games for the Blues, he had a .226 batting average.	
The Only Nolan	Pitcher / Utility player	1881	Nolan's 1881 season with the Blues was the second, and last, full season at the major league level. He had an 8–14 win–loss record in 24 games pitched. When he wasn't pitching, he played at various other fielding positions.	
Bill Phillips	First baseman	1879–1884	Phillips played in each season of the Blues' existence, and he is their all-time leader in most batting statistical categories.	
George Pinkney	Infielder	1884	Pinkney had a .313 batting average during his lone season with the Blues.	
Phil Powers	Catcher	1881	Powers played in five games for the Blues, and had one hit in 15 at bats.	
Blondie Purcell	Outfielder	1881	Purcell played in 20 games for the Blues before finishing the season with the Buffalo Bisons.	
Jack Remsen	Center fielder	1881	Remsen played in 48 games as the Blues' center fielder and had a .176 batting average.	
John Richmond	Center fielder	1882	Richmond played in 41 games as the Blues' center fielder and had a .171 batting average.	
Billy Riley	Left fielder	1879	Riley's appearance with the 1879 team was his only experience at the major league level.	
Dave Rowe	Center fielder	1882	Playing mainly in center field, Rowe played in 24 games for the Blues, and had a .258 batting average.	
Will Sawyer	Pitcher	1883	In his only season at the major league level, Sawyer had a 4–10 win–loss record in 17 games pitched.	
Orator Shafer	Right fielder	1880–1882	Shafer played three full seasons for the Blues as their starting right fielder. In two of those seasons, he led the league's right fielders in games played.	
Bill Smith	Left fielder	1884	At the age of 19, Smith played in just one game for the Blues.	
Germany Smith	Infielder	1884	In his first major league season, Smith split his playing time between second base and shortstop.	
Pop Smith	Third baseman	1881	Smith played in 10 games for the Blues, and he had a .118 batting average.	
Len Stockwell	Outfielder	1879	Over a two-game span, Stockwell went hitless in six at bats.	
George Strief	Center fielder / Infielder	1879, 1884	In 1879, Strief played in 71 games for the Blues, mainly in center field. He returned to the team in 1884, and played in eight more.	
Billy Taylor	Left fielder	1881	Although he became a starting pitcher later in his career, Taylor played all 23 of his games with the Blues as a left fielder.	
John Tilley	Left fielder	1882	In his one season with the Blues, Tilley collected just five hits in 56 at bats for a .089 batting average.	
Fred Warner	Third baseman / Outfielder	1879	In 76 games for the Blues, Warner had a .244 batting average.	
Harry Wheeler	Left fielder	1880	Wheeler played in one game for the Blues before finishing the season with the Cincinnati Reds.	
Guerdon Whiteley	Outfielder	1884	In eight games for the Blues, Whiteley had a .147 batting average.	
Julius Willigrod	Center fielder	1882	Nine of Willigrod's 10 career games were with the Blues. He had a .154 career batting average.	
Tom York	Left fielder	1883	During York's one season with the Blues, he led the league in bases on balls and games played by a left fielder.	

== Bibliography ==
- Egan, James M. (2008). Base Ball on the Western Reserve: The Early Game in Cleveland and Northeast Ohio, Year by Year and Town by Town, 1865–1900 (illustrated ed.). McFarland. ISBN 978-0786430673.
- Purdy, Dennis (2010). Kiss 'Em Goodbye: An ESPN Treasury of Failed, Forgotten, and Departed Teams (illustrated ed.). Random House Digital, Inc. ISBN 978-0345520128.
- Spink, Alfred Henry (2000) [1911]. The National Game. Carbondale: Southern Illinois University Press. ISBN 0809323044.
