= 1884 Cleveland Blues season =

1884 Cleveland Blues
- League: National League
- Ballpark: Kennard Street Park
- City: Cleveland, Ohio
- Record: 35–77 (.313)
- League place: 7th
- Manager: Charlie Hackett

The 1884 Cleveland Blues season was a season in American baseball. It involved the Blues finishing the season at 35–77, seventh place in the National League. After the season, the team was purchased by Charles Byrne for $10,000 and shut down, many of the players being added to Byrne's Brooklyn Grays team.

== Regular season ==
=== Season standings ===
National League
Team	W	L	Pct.	GB	Home	Road
Providence Grays	84	28	.750	—	45‍–‍11	39‍–‍17
Boston Beaneaters	73	38	.658	10½	40‍–‍16	33‍–‍22
Buffalo Bisons	64	47	.577	19½	37‍–‍18	27‍–‍29
New York Gothams	62	50	.554	22	34‍–‍22	28‍–‍28
Chicago White Stockings	62	50	.554	22	39‍–‍17	23‍–‍33
Philadelphia Quakers	39	73	.348	45	19‍–‍37	20‍–‍36
Cleveland Blues	35	77	.312	49	22‍–‍34	13‍–‍43
Detroit Wolverines	28	84	.250	56	18‍–‍38	10‍–‍46

=== Record vs. opponents ===
1884 National League record Sources:
Team	BSN	BUF	CHI	CLE	DET	NYG	PHI	PRO
Boston	—	9–6–2	10–6	14–2	12–4–1	8–8–1	13–3	7–9–1
Buffalo	6–9–2	—	10–6–1	14–2	12–4	5–11–1	11–5	6–10
Chicago	6–10	6–10–1	—	8–8	11–5	12–4	14–2	5–11
Cleveland	2–14	2–14	8–8	—	9–7	5–11	6–10–1	3–13
Detroit	4–12–1	4–12	5–11	7–9	—	2–14–1	5–11	1–15
New York	8–8–1	11–5–1	4–12	11–5	14–2–1	—	11–5	3–13–1
Philadelphia	3–13	5–11	2–14	10–6–1	11–5	5–11	—	3–13
Providence	9–7–1	10–6	11–5	13–3	15–1	13–3–1	13–3	—

=== Roster ===
1884 Cleveland Blues
Roster
Pitchers: John Harkins; John Henry; Jim McCormick; Catchers: Fatty Briody; Doc Bushong; Jerry Moore	Infielders: Joe Ardner; George Fisher; Jack Glasscock; Mike Moynahan; Mike Muldoon; Bill Phillips; George Pinkney; Germany Smith	Outfielders: Ernie Burch; Jake Evans; Pit Gilman; Pete Hotaling; Sam Moffet; Willie Murphy; Bill Smith; George Strief; Guerdon Whiteley	Manager: Charlie Hackett

== Player stats ==
=== Batting ===
==== Starters by position ====
Note: Pos = Position; G = Games played; AB = At bats; H = Hits; Avg. = Batting average; HR = Home runs; RBI = Runs batted in

Pos	Player	G	AB	H	Avg.	HR	RBI
C	Doc Bushong	62	203	48	.236	0	10
1B	Bill Phillips	111	464	128	.276	3	46
2B	Germany Smith	72	291	74	.254	4	26
SS	Jack Glasscock	72	281	70	.249	1	22
3B	Mike Muldoon	110	422	101	.239	2	38
OF	Pete Hotaling	102	408	99	.243	3	27
OF	Willie Murphy	42	168	38	.226	1	9
OF	Jake Evans	80	313	81	.259	1	38

==== Other batters ====
Note: G = Games played; AB = At bats; H = Hits; Avg. = Batting average; HR = Home runs; RBI = Runs batted in

Player	G	AB	H	Avg.	HR	RBI
Sam Moffet	67	256	47	.184	0	15
Fatty Briody	43	148	25	.169	1	12
George Pinkney	36	144	45	.313	0	16
Ernie Burch	32	124	26	.210	0	7
Joe Ardner	26	92	16	.174	0	4
Mike Moynahan	12	45	13	.289	0	6
Guerdon Whiteley	8	34	5	.147	0	0
Jerry Moore	9	30	6	.200	0	10
George Strief	8	29	7	.241	0	0
George Fisher	6	24	3	.125	0	0
Pit Gilman	2	10	1	.100	0	0
Bill Smith	1	3	0	.000	0	0

=== Pitching ===
==== Starting pitchers ====
Note: G = Games pitched; IP = Innings pitched; W = Wins; L = Losses; ERA = Earned run average; SO = Strikeouts

Player	G	IP	W	L	ERA	SO
John Harkins	46	391.0	12	32	3.68	192
Jim McCormick	42	359.0	19	22	2.86	182
Sam Moffet	24	197.2	3	19	3.87	84
John Henry	5	42.0	1	4	3.64	23

==== Relief pitchers ====
Note: G = Games pitched; W = Wins; L = Losses; SV = Saves; ERA = Earned run average; SO = Strikeouts

Player	G	W	L	SV	ERA	SO
Jack Glasscock	2	0	0	0	5.40	1
