= List of Cleveland Blues (NL) managers =

The Cleveland Blues were a professional baseball franchise that played in the National League (NL) from 1879 until 1884. The team employed six individuals in the capacity of on-field manager. Four of the six were also player-managers.

The first manager for the Blues was Jim McCormick, who was also the team's main pitcher. He stayed in that capacity for two seasons, winning just 74 of 167 games from 1879 to 1880. In 1882, he managed four more games, but did not win any of them. The franchise's all-time leader in managerial wins (55) and winning percentage (.567) was Frank Bancroft, their first non-playing manager.

== Managers ==
Individuals who managed the Cleveland Blues (NL), with seasons, games total, record, and winning percentage
#	Images	Manager	Season(s)	Games	Wins	Losses	Win %	Ref
1		Jim McCormick	1879–1880, 1882	171	74	96	.435	
2		Mike McGeary	1881	11	4	7	.364	
3		John Clapp	1881	74	32	42	.438	
4		Fred Dunlap	1882	80	42	36	.538	
5		Frank Bancroft	1883	100	55	42	.567	
6		Charlie Hackett	1884	113	35	77	.313	
