= David Hall =

David or Dave Hall may refer to:

== Sports ==
- David Hall (runner) (1875–1972), American middle-distance runner, track and basketball coach, and university professor
- David Hall (footballer) (born 1954), English professional footballer active in the 1970s
- David Hall (horse trainer) (born 1963), Australian horse trainer
- Dave Hall (rugby league) (born 1954), rugby league footballer of the 1980s for Great Britain, and Hull Kingston Rovers
- David Hall (rugby league) (born 1968), Australian rugby league footballer of the 1980s and 1990s
- David Hall (rugby union) (born 1980), New Zealand
- David Hall (Australian tennis) (born 1970), Australian wheelchair tennis player
- David Hall (American tennis), American tennis player
- David Hall (baseball coach), Rice Owls baseball head coach, 1981–1991

== Politicians ==
- David Hall (Australian politician) (1874–1945), Australian politician
- David Hall (Canadian politician) (born c. 1939), first leader of the Prince Edward Island New Democratic Party in Canada
- David Hall (Delaware politician) (1752–1817), American lawyer and governor of Delaware
- David Hall (Irish politician), Irish Labour party politician, represented Meath in the 1920s
- David Hall (Oklahoma politician) (1930–2016), U.S. Democratic Party politician
- David Hall (Swedish politician), served as Minister of Finance of Sweden, 1949
- Dave Hall (Dayton mayor) (1906–1977), American politician of the Ohio Republican party
- Dave Hall (Indiana politician), state representative from Indiana
- Dave Hall (Ohio state representative) (born 1960), Republican member of the Ohio House of Representatives
- David McKee Hall (1918–1960), representative from North Carolina
- David Aiken Hall (1795–1870), American attorney, author, and politician

== Arts ==
- David Hall (sound archivist) (1916–2012), American sound archivist and writer
- David Hall (video artist) (1937–2014), British video artist
- Dave Hall (music producer), American record producer
- David S. Hall (art director) (1905–1964), British art director
- Dave U. Hall, American musician

== Others ==
- David D. Hall (born 1936), American historian
- David J. Hall (photographer) (born 1943), underwater wildlife photographer
- David M. Hall, writer and corporate trainer
- David S. Hall (RFC officer) (1892–1917), World War I flying ace
- David Hall (campaigner) (born 1970/1971), Irish businessman and campaigner
- David Hall (chemist) (1928–2016), New Zealand chemist
- David Hall (printer) (1714–1772), American printer and business partner with Benjamin Franklin
- David Locke Hall (born 1955), former assistant United States attorney, Naval Intelligence officer, and author
- David Hall (paediatrician) (born 1945), British paediatrician
- Davey Hall (born 1951), British trade unionist
- David Hall (American businessman) (born 1951), founder of Velodyne, Velodyne Lidar and Velodyne Marine
- David Hall (university administrator), American law professor and academic

== See also ==
- David Halls, one of the chefs in Hudson and Halls
