= John Harkins (baseball) =

American baseball player (1859–1940)

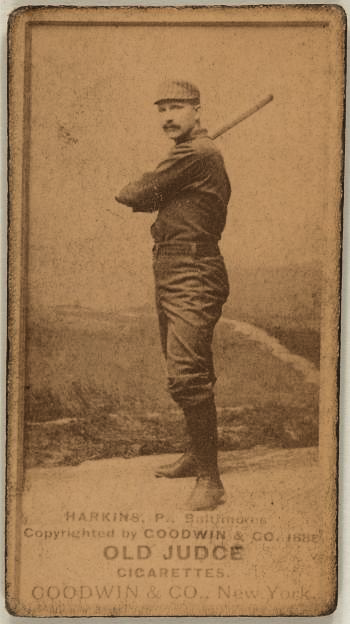
- Pitcher
- Born: April 12, 1859; New Brunswick, New Jersey, U.S.
- Died: November 20, 1940 (aged 81); New Brunswick, New Jersey, U.S.
- Batted: Right Threw: Right

MLB debut
- May 2, 1884, for the Cleveland Blues

Last MLB appearance
- May 1, 1888, for the Baltimore Orioles

MLB statistics
- Win–loss record: 51–83
- Earned run average: 4.09
- Strikeouts: 489
- Stats at Baseball Reference

Teams
- Cleveland Blues (1884); Brooklyn Grays (1885)–(1887); Baltimore Orioles (1888)

John Joseph "Pa" Harkins (April 12, 1859 – November 20, 1940) was a 19th-century Major League Baseball player who pitched for three teams in his five season career that lasted from 1884 to 1888.

== Playing career ==
After attending Rutgers University as a chemistry student, he signed a contract with a Semi-professional team based in Trenton, New Jersey in 1881. He played with Trenton until 1884 when he was sold to the Cleveland Blues of the National League. John finished his first major league season with 12 wins against 32 losses, 42 complete games, and a 3.68 earned run average.

When the 1884 season finished, the Blues folded, and many of their player were bought by the Brooklyn Grays, including John, Doc Bushong, George Pinkney, and Germany Smith. During his three seasons with Brooklyn he pitched alongside of ace Henry Porter, and Adonis Terry, winning 39 games. He was sold to the Baltimore Orioles after the 1887 season and pitched in only game.

== Post-career ==
During John's playing days, he acted in an advisory role for the coaching staff of the baseball teams at Yale University, Lehigh University and Princeton University. Later, when he took over as the head coach of Yale's baseball team, one of his players was long-time future college football head coach for the University of Chicago and the University of the Pacific, Amos Alonzo Stagg. Harkins convinced Stagg to switch from outfielder to pitcher, and the two became friends, a friendship that lasted over 50 years. Later owned and operated a café for many years, and was an alderman in New Brunswick and then a Sergeant-at-Arms for the local court.

John died of a heart attack at the age of 81 in his hometown of New Brunswick, and is interred at St. Peter's Cemetery.

| Preceded by Sam Kimber | Brooklyn Grays; Opening Day; Starting pitcher 1885–1886 | Succeeded by Henry Porter |
