= Fred Gunkle =

American baseball player (1857–1936)

- Catcher/Outfielder
- Born: October 26, 1857; Reading, Pennsylvania, U.S.
- Died: December 21, 1936 (aged 79); Long Beach, California, U.S.
- Batted: Unknown Threw: Unknown

MLB debut
- May 17, 1879, for the Cleveland Blues

Last MLB appearance
- May 17, 1879, for the Cleveland Blues

MLB statistics
- At bats: 3
- RBI: 0
- Home runs: 0
- Batting average: .000
- Stats at Baseball Reference

Teams
- Cleveland Blues (1879)

Frederick William Gunkle (October 26, 1857 – December 21, 1936) was an American professional baseball player who played one game for the 1879 Cleveland Blues. In the game, played on May 17, Gunkle started at catcher, but after making three errors and allowing seven passed balls in just three innings, he was switched to the outfield for the rest of the game.

== Biography ==
Gunkle was born on October 26, 1857, in Reading, Pennsylvania, to the German immigrants Fred and Elizabeth Gunkle. His father was a roadmaster at the Philadelphia & Reading Railroad. When young, Gunkle was an apprentice machinist and later became a skilled artisan. He moved to Chicago, Illinois, in 1876 and accepted a job at the Crane Brothers Manufacturing Company.

In May 1879, Gunkle was able to convince the Cleveland Blues of the National League (NL), who were desperate for a catcher after several injuries, to have him play the position. He went on a train and left for Cleveland mid-month. He played one game, catching for pitcher Jim McCormick, but "proved so incapable" at catching that Cleveland moved him to outfielder. He allowed seven passed balls and committed three errors in three innings. He also appeared at-bat three times, but made no hits. It was his only game of professional baseball. A local newspaper wrote afterwards, "all that was necessary for a man to score a run was to get to first base somehow, passed balls would do the rest." After the game was over, Gunkle returned to Chicago, though one newspaper reporter wrote that he would "have to walk back to Chicago as it was doubted he could catch well enough to catch the train."

Later in the year, Gunkle moved to Dubuque, Iowa, and was hired by the Iowa Iron Works. He was named a traveling representative for the Samuel Bliss & Company, of Chicago, two years later.

In 1884, Gunkle attempted to return to baseball. He was hired as an umpire for the Northwestern League, although one newspaper wrote that he "can't tell a ball from a strike." He was out of the position shortly afterwards, but signed a contract with the Stillwater, Minnesota, team as manager at the beginning of July.

After having no success as Stillwater manager, Gunkle came back to Sioux City and was hired as a traveling salesman of the Sioux City Steam Engine Works. He was hired by the Dubuque Cigar House in 1886. He spent much time traveling around states in this position, which led to a newspaper calling him "the ubiquitous Gunkle."

In the late 1880s, Gunkle umpired several baseball games in South Dakota, and was met with more favorable notice, with one newspaper writing that he "made an excellent umpire."

In June 1888, Gunkle married Emma Carter, who was from Sioux Falls. He was listed as a machinist in 1889 and 1890 by the Sioux City directory. He was appointed deputy marshal in the northern district of Iowa western division in 1891, and held that position through 1895. Afterwards, he was employed by the Andrew Kuehn Company as a traveling representative in 1896. He left in 1897 to enter the tobacco and cigar business in Sioux Falls.

Near 1909, Gunkle and his wife moved to Indianapolis, Indiana. He was employed as a representative for a paint company for the next 18 years. He also served during this time as a member of the Master House Painters' and Decorators Association of Indiana advisory board. In 1927, he retired.

During November 1936, Gunkle went to California to get an operation for chronic prostatitis. He contracted pneumonia afterwards and died on December 21, 1936, in Long Beach. He was 79 at the time of his death and was buried at the Forest Lawn Memorial Park in Glendale.
