= Bushong =

Bushong / Boschung
Origin
- Language: German / Swiss German
- Region of origin: Switzerland and Palatinate

Other names
- Variant form: Bushon

Bushong is a surname found mostly in the United States, derived from the surname Boschung found mainly in Switzerland, but also in the Palatinate and other regions in Western Europe.

== Surname history ==
The American surname, Bushong and variant Bushon, prior to being anglicized, was the German-Swiss name, Boschung. The spelling was changed after immigration to Colonial America. The immigrants, Hans and Johann Nicholas both arrived as Boschung, Hans in 1731 and Johann Nicholas in 1732. The original ships manifests and transcriptions list them as Boschung, but the spelling was changed in their American lives.

== The origin and meaning of the Bushong surname ==
One favored theory is the surname is based on two syllables, Bosch and ung. Bosch is considered a Germanic topographical name, derived from the Latin word, boscus which translates to wood, as in forest. Subsequently, the patronymic suffix ung was added to the original name and means descendants of (the Bosch). It has been theorized that the reason to differentiate from an original Bosch family, with the addition of the suffix, was that there had been a large well established Bosch family. The patronymic suffix identified them as having separated by proximity from the original family. In other words, the families who moved away were not the Bosch, they were the Boschung. All occurring as surnames were beginning to be the accepted practice.

== Origination of the Boschung family ==
There are several Boschung family lines, originating in Switzerland, one of which started in 1750, when a line Bosson, changed its names spelling to Boschung. Another line began in 1600 in Boltigen, Switzerland, with a name change from Studer, and this is believed to be beginning of the Colonial American Bushong. However, the Boschung name is first noted in the 1520s in Jaun, Fribourg, Switzerland and in the 1530s a few miles away in the Canton of Bern, Switzerland. (Note: Johann Boschung was born about 1525 in Jaun, Fribourg, Switzerland. Barthlome Boschung was born about 1533 and baptized in Saanen, Bern, Switzerland. Both are charted in the Bushong United Family Tree.) These families whether related or not represent the majority of the Boschung. All would have been spoken a Swiss German dialect, more specifically its predecessor western High Alemannic dialect (Bernese German).

== Colonial period immigration to the United States ==
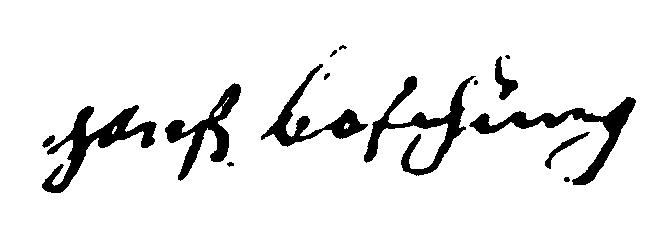
Hans Boschung signature 1731, Philadelphia, Pennsylvania.

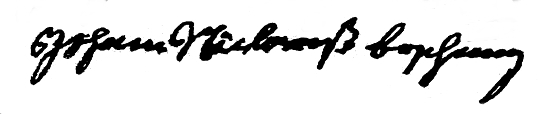
Johann Nicholas Boschung's signature on the 1732 Oath of Allegiance.

For the vast majority, the Bushong Family of America descend from two immigrants, Hans Boschung and Johann Nicholas Boschung. Hans and Johann Nicholas Boschung arrived in port of Philadelphia, Pennsylvania in 1731 and 1732 respectively. They were Protestants of the Reformed Swiss sect, who left Switzerland and spent some years in the Palatinate. (Note: In 1731, the Reformed Church of Holland and the Synod of Dort helped to facilitate the passengers of the Brittania, and visited them as a body. "While the Synod of South Holland was in session in Dort, 1731, eight hundred exiled Palatines passed through the place to take ship at Rotterdam for America. They were visited by the whole Synod in a body and were furnished with provisions and medicines. After Christian exhortation, prayer and singing, they were dismissed with the assurance that they might rely upon the Church of Holland for support in their new abode."-- Ger. Ref. Almanac p. 22 for 1865.)

The 1732 pink John and William ship's manifest from its arrival in Philadelphia, Pennsylvania.

The 1732 Oath of Allegiance signed by the pink John and William adult male immigrants.

Hans Boschung immigrated with his family on the ship Brittania and qualified for entry to the Colonies September 21, 1731. They were listed, Barbara age 37, and their children, Magdelen age 11, Hans Phillip age 9, Ana Barbara age 6, Christiana age 3.

Johann Nicholas Boschung immigrated with his family on the ill-fated voyage of the pink John and William and qualified for entry to the Colonies October 17, 1732. (Note: The voyage in 1732, was apparently Ships Master, Captain Tymperton and the John and William's only crossing. During the voyage, 44 passengers perished and with many sick, it ended in mutiny delaying their arrival. It is also possible that on the voyage, Johann Nicholas' son by the same name, born 1727 in Germany, was one of those who died.) Listed on the manifest as Paschun, with his wife, Magdalena (over 16) and their children, Hendrich, Eve, Andreas, Maria.

The Bushongs originally settled in Lancaster County, Pennsylvania, where they were members of the Salem Hellers Reformed Church. (Note: The Bushongs were members of the First Reformed Church, Lancaster, Pennsylvania. Also sailing with the Boschungs on the Brittania was a Johannes Batholomay Rieger. His name, on the ship's manifest, is followed with, the old German Hochteutscher Prediger which translated means high German preacher. In Lancaster County, Rev. Rieger became a well known Reformed minister in several area churches, including the Salem Hellers Reformed Church.) Today descendants who can trace their ancestry back to Hans and Johann Nicholas Bushong number in the thousands.

== Post-colonial immigration to the United States ==
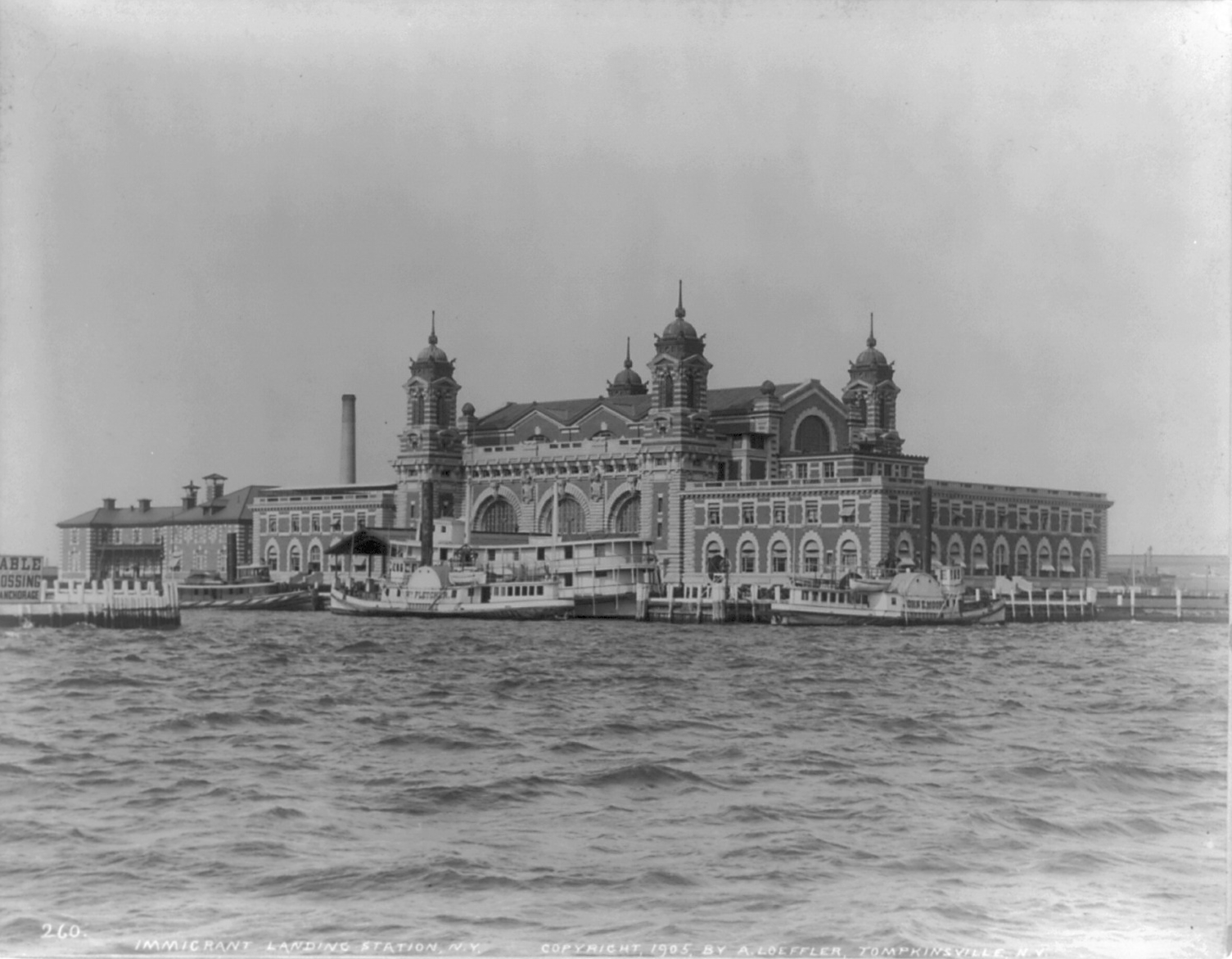
Ellis Island in 1905

There are a few other family lines with the Bushong surname in America. Some are descended from French Catholics who immigrated from Nova Scotia, Canada to the United States in the 19th and 20th century while others are descended from slaves of the Bushongs prior to the American Civil War. (Note: Find these Bushongs and others in the Bushong United Family Tree) There also appear to be a few different lines of European Bushongs. These families immigrated to the United States in the mid to late 19th century from what was a war torn central Europe and took the Bushong name. But with about 1.2 million other mostly Germans immigrants, there was at least one Greek Bushong. (Note: Samuel Theodore Bushong, from Greece, changed his name to Bushong from Bozinakis. He was the founder of the Bushong Candy Company, Wichita, Kansas.) Their surnames all had various original spellings, Bushing, Busching, Buchen, Bushan, and others. During this period the most common immigration destination in the United States was New York, through Ellis Island.

== Some common Bushong myths ==
=== The colonial immigrant Bushongs descend from Beauchamp ===
In the beginning of the 20th century, it was thought that Colonial Bushongs descended from the French Beauchamps and that the name was originally spelled that way. It is not certain exactly when the myth originated, but in 1900 Oscar Kuhns published The Germans and Swiss settlements of colonial Pennsylvania: a study of the so-called Pennsylvania Dutch. In it he stated the Bushongs were French Huguenots and their name was originally Beauchamp...

"These German names almost all came from the Palatinate and Switzerland. Even today we can trace the Swiss origin of many-for instance, Urner (from Uri), Johns (Tschantz), Neagley (Naegeli), Bossler (Baseler). Some are of French Huguenot origin, which by combined German and English influence have often received a not very elegant or euphonious form: examples are Lemon (Le Mon), Bushong (Beauchamp)".

Rev. A. Stapleton published this book in 1901- "Memorials of the Huguenots in America, with special reference to their emigration to Pennsylvania"

"Beauchamp, — In 1731 arrived; Beauchamp and wife Barbara, the head of the "Bushong" family, now so numerous in America. He located in East Lampeter, near the Heller Church. He was born in France in 1692. His son Jacob located in Berks county and was the head of the Bushong family of Berks county, while another son, Peter, emigrated to the Shenandoah Valley in Virginia, and founded the Southern branch."

=== Multiple lines of colonial Bushongs immigrated ===
One theory fostered by some, was that there were numerous different lines of Bushongs entering Colonial America, some with different spellings. To date there is no evidence to support this theory and to the contrary, thousands of Bushong descendants are listed as descendants of Hans Boschung and Johann Nicholas Boschung's son, Andreas. With a charting project for the entire Bushong 1930 United States census completed and most identified, it makes multiple lines that much more improbable.

=== Bosang descend from Bushong ===
This myth was first mentioned in the late 1980s or early 1990s by several Bushong researchers, who perceived a similarity between the surnames Bosang and Bushong. It was suggested that David Bosang, whose name was spelled Bosseng before it was Anglicized, had been a Bushong in Europe prior to leaving. Though lacking any European documentation, the myth gained a degree of legitimacy through repeated publishing of Bosang's United States documentation mixed with the Bushong name. It is probable that Bosseng is a variant spelling of the surname Bossong.

== Some notable people, places, and businesses ==
- Dr. Lee C. Bushong, U.S. Marine, deputy sheriff, and professor.
- Albert J. "Doc" Bushong D.D.S., Baseball player, Dentist
- Howard F. Bushong, American baseball coach
- Robert Grey Bushong, U.S. House of Representatives, Pennsylvania
- Bushong, Kansas
- Bushong's Mill Covered Bridge, Lancaster County, Pennsylvania
