= Guerdon Whiteley =

American baseball player (1859–1925)

- Outfielder
- Born: October 5, 1859; Hopkinton, Rhode Island, U.S.
- Died: November 23, 1925 (aged 66); Cranston, Rhode Island, U.S.
- Batted: Unknown Threw: Unknown

MLB debut
- August 7, 1884, for the Cleveland Blues

Last MLB appearance
- July 15, 1885, for the Boston Beaneaters

MLB statistics
- Games played: 41
- At bats: 169
- Hits: 30
- Stats at Baseball Reference

Teams
- Cleveland Blues (1884); Boston Beaneaters (1885)

Guerdon W. Whiteley (October 5, 1859 – November 23, 1925) was an American Major League Baseball outfielder who played for two seasons. He played for the Cleveland Blues in eight games during the 1884 Cleveland Blues season and for the Boston Beaneaters for 33 games during the 1885 Boston Beaneaters season. He continued to play in the minor league until 1892.
