= Maria M. C. Hall =

American Civil War nurse

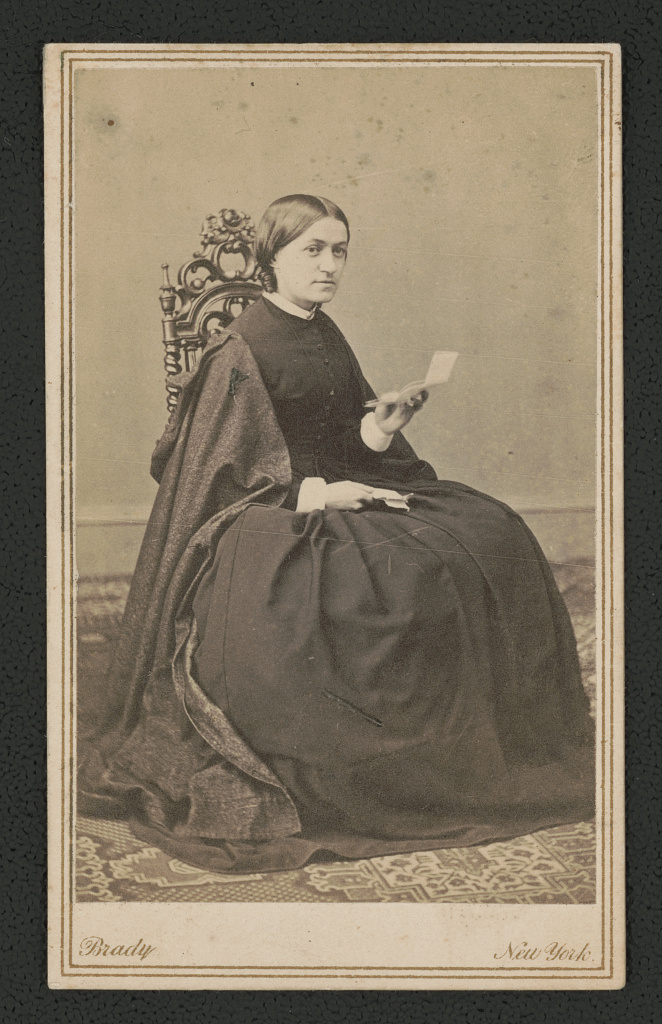
- Born: July 1, 1836; Washington, D.C.
- Died: July 20, 1912 (aged 76); West Hartford
- Occupation: Nurse

Maria M. C. Hall (July 1, 1836 – July 20, 1912) was an American Civil War nurse.

== Early life and education ==
Maria M. C. Hall was born on July 1, 1836 in Washington, D.C., the daughter of lawyer David Aiken Hall and his second wife, Martha Maria Condict, daughter of US Representative Lewis Condict. She was educated at Miss Draper's Seminary in Hartford, Connecticut.

== American Civil War ==
At the start of the American Civil War, the twenty-five year old Hall attempted to volunteer as a military nurse. She was rejected, as Superintendent of Army Nurses Dorothea Dix favored older, unattractive women, who she believed would be less vulnerable and better prepared for the arduous work. Hall then appealed to Almira Fales of the United States Sanitary Commission, who allowed Hall to work at the Indiana Hospital in the US Patent Office building from July 1861 to July 1862. In February 1862, she was dispatched to the White House to care for Tad Lincoln, who was sick with the same typhoid fever that killed his brother Willie Lincoln, but was soon replaced by Rebecca Pomeroy.

In the summer of 1862, she joined the hospital ship Daniel Webster no. 2, where she worked alongside nurse Eliza Harris during the Peninsular Campaign. After the Battle of Antietam in September, she attended to the wounded at Smoketown Hospital, a field hospital. Because of her work there, she was recruited by Dr. Bernard A. Vanderkieft to work at the hospital of the United States Naval Academy in Annapolis, Maryland in May 1863. A year later she was promoted to Nurse Superintendent of the hospital and worked there for another year until the closure of the hospital in the summer of 1865.

== Post-war life ==
In 1872, she married Lucas Richards, president of a paper company, Delaney & Munson Manufacturing Company of Unionville, Connecticut. They had two children. Maria M. C. Hall died on 20 July 1912 in West Hartford, Connecticut.
