= List of Major League Baseball consecutive games played leaders =

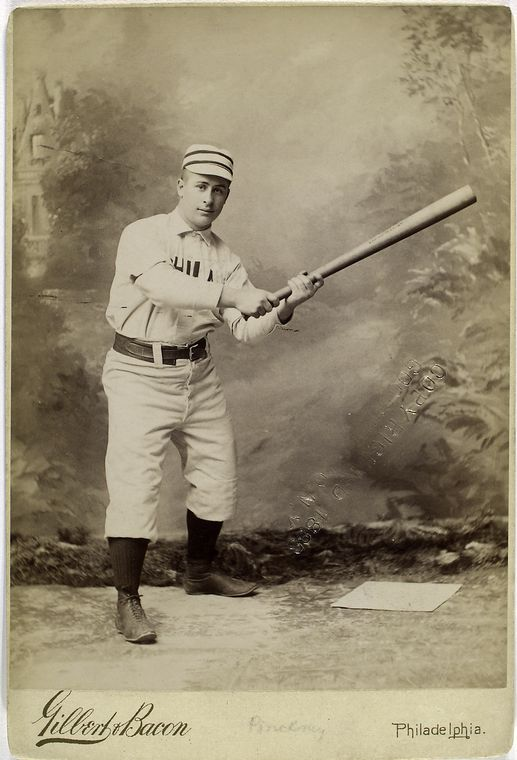
George Pinkney, whose major-league career spanned 1884–1893, was the first player to appear in 500 consecutive major-league games.

To compile a streak of consecutive games in Major League Baseball, a player must appear in every game played by his team. The streak is broken if the team completes a game in which the player neither takes a turn at bat nor plays a half-inning in the field.

The record—2,632 consecutive games, a streak compiled over more than 16 years—is held by Cal Ripken Jr. of the Baltimore Orioles, and is considered to be one of the league's unbreakable records. Ripken surpassed Lou Gehrig of the New York Yankees, whose record of 2,130 consecutive games had stood for 56 years. Before Gehrig, the record was held by Everett Scott (1,307 consecutive games), a shortstop with the Red Sox and Yankees whose streak ended in 1925, less than a month before Gehrig's began. Scott broke the record held by George Pinkney: 577 consecutive games from 1885 to 1890.

The record for a National League player is held by Steve Garvey of the Los Angeles Dodgers and San Diego Padres (1975–1983); Garvey's 1,207-game streak is less than half the length of Ripken's. Previous holders of the National League record include Billy Williams of the Chicago Cubs (1963–1970), Stan Musial of the St. Louis Cardinals (1952–1957), and Gus Suhr of the Pittsburgh Pirates (1931–1937).

Of the top 18 streaks on this list, nine were compiled by members of the Baseball Hall of Fame. Two others are separate streaks compiled by Pete Rose, who was named one of the top 30 players of the 20th century but was banned from the Hall of Fame until 2025. Another is the active streak compiled by Matt Olson of the Atlanta Braves. Olson and Pete Alonso's streak are the two active streaks on this list.

== Key ==
Player	Name of the player
Streak	Number of consecutive games
Start	Date of the game which began the streak
End	Date of the final game of the streak
	Denotes an active streak
	Elected to the National Baseball Hall of Fame

== List ==
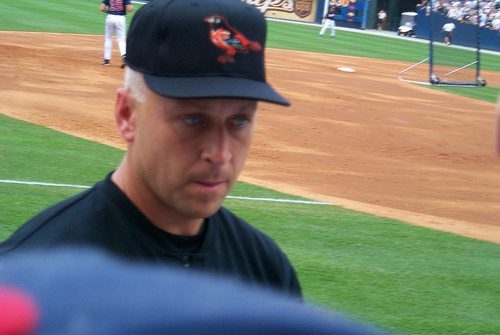
Cal Ripken Jr. holds the record of 2,632 consecutive games played after his final consecutive game on September 19, 1998.

Minimum 500 consecutive games played

Rank	Player	Streak	Start	End
1	Cal Ripken Jr.	2,632	May 30, 1982	September 19, 1998
2	Lou Gehrig	2,130	June 1, 1925	April 30, 1939
3	Everett Scott	1,307	June 20, 1916	May 5, 1925
4	Steve Garvey	1,207	September 3, 1975	July 29, 1983
5	Miguel Tejada	1,152	June 2, 2000	June 21, 2007
6	Billy Williams	1,117	September 22, 1963	September 2, 1970
7	Joe Sewell	1,103	September 13, 1922	April 30, 1930
8	Matt Olson	944	May 2, 2021	Active
9	Stan Musial	895	April 15, 1952	August 22, 1957
10	Eddie Yost	829	August 30, 1949	May 11, 1955
11	Gus Suhr	822	September 11, 1931	June 4, 1937
12	Nellie Fox	798	August 7, 1955	September 3, 1960
13	Pete Rose	745	September 1, 1978	August 23, 1983
14	Dale Murphy	740	September 26, 1981	July 8, 1986
15	Richie Ashburn	730	June 7, 1950	September 26, 1954
16	Ernie Banks	717	August 26, 1956	June 22, 1961
17	Pete Rose	678	September 28, 1973	May 7, 1978
18	Earl Averill	673	April 14, 1931	June 28, 1935
19	Frank McCormick	652	April 19, 1938	May 24, 1942
20	Sandy Alomar Sr.	648	May 16, 1969	May 20, 1973
21	Eddie Brown	618	June 5, 1924	June 7, 1928
22	Roy McMillan	584	September 16, 1951	August 7, 1955
23	Pete Alonso	577	June 18, 2023	Active
23	George Pinkney	577	September 21, 1885	April 30, 1890
25	Steve Brodie	574	April 27, 1893	June 26, 1897
26	Aaron Ward	565	July 10, 1920	May 25, 1924
27	Whit Merrifield	553	June 25, 2018	July 10, 2022
28	Prince Fielder	547	September 14, 2010	May 16, 2014
29	Alex Rodriguez	546	July 25, 2000	September 23, 2003
30	Candy LaChance	539	June 24, 1901	April 28, 1905
31	Buck Freeman	536	July 27, 1901	June 5, 1905
32	Fred Luderus	533	June 2, 1916	September 28, 1919
33	Hideki Matsui	519	March 31, 2003	May 11, 2006
34	Clyde Milan	511	August 12, 1910	October 3, 1913
34	Charlie Gehringer	511	September 3, 1927	May 7, 1931
36	Vada Pinson	508	September 26, 1958	May 30, 1962
37	Joe Carter	507	September 13, 1988	April 8, 1992
37	Mark Teixeira	507	May 21, 2004	June 8, 2007
39	Tony Cuccinello	504	July 9, 1930	August 24, 1933
39	Charlie Gehringer	504	June 25, 1932	August 11, 1935
41	Omar Moreno	503	June 19, 1979	September 4, 1982

== Official definition ==
MLB's rule 10.23(c), defining consecutive game streaks, is as follows: "A consecutive game playing streak shall be extended if the player plays one half inning on defense, or if he completes a time at bat by reaching base or being put out. A pinch running appearance only shall not extend the streak. If a player is ejected from a game by an umpire before he can comply with the requirements of this rule, his streak shall continue."

Thus it is possible for a pinch-runner to enter a game and record a statistic—steal a base, be caught stealing, or score a run—without being credited with a (consecutive) game played. Indeed, Juan Pierre appeared in 821 consecutive games from 2002 to 2007, but on June 3, 2005, he was used solely as a pinch runner. Under Rule 10.23(c), this resulted in separate games-played streaks of 386 and 434 games.

Similarly, a fielder can field a ball in play, make a putout or an assist, and even commit an error, without being credited with a (consecutive) game played. For example, Hideki Matsui's consecutive games streak was ended when he broke his wrist diving for a ball with two outs in the first inning of the Yankee game of May 11, 2006. That game would have been number 519 in his MLB streak and number 1,769 in his MLB/Japan game streak (see below), but since Matsui did not play a full half-inning on defense, that game is sometimes not counted in his streak. MLB and the Society for American Baseball Research both credit Matsui with having played 519 consecutive MLB games.

== Streak starts, continuations, and ends ==
Lou Gehrig's streak started as a pinch-hitter. The next day he started at first base in place of slumping Wally Pipp and stayed there for fourteen years. On July 14, 1934, Gehrig, suffering from an attack of lumbago, was listed in the Yankee lineup at shortstop. He batted in the top of the first inning to preserve the streak, singled, and was promptly removed from the game. Gehrig's streak was ended by amyotrophic lateral sclerosis, the disease that would take his life. His physical abilities rapidly declining, Gehrig told manager Joe McCarthy to take him out of the lineup on May 2, 1939. He never played again, dying in 1941.

Garvey's streak was ended when he dislocated his thumb in a home plate collision against the Atlanta Braves.

Scott's streak was ended when Manager Miller Huggins benched him in favor of Pee Wee Wanninger.

Ripken says that the closest he ever came to not playing during his streak was the day after he twisted his knee during a bench-clearing brawl against the Seattle Mariners in June 1993. When the 1994–95 player's strike threatened to destroy Ripken's streak as baseball owners planned to use replacement players, Baltimore owner Peter Angelos announced that the Orioles would rather not field a team than see Ripken's streak snapped. The replacement player scenario never came to pass, as the remainder of the 1994 season—including the World Series—was cancelled due to the strike. Ripken broke Gehrig's record on September 6, 1995. Ripken himself made the decision not to play on September 20, 1998, the Orioles' last home game of the season. Rookie Ryan Minor played third base for Ripken in a 5–4 loss to the Yankees. Ripken's record is considered by many to be unbreakable.

Miguel Tejada's streak ended after Doug Brocail hit Tejada on the wrist with a pitch on June 20, 2007. During the game on June 21, Tejada took an at-bat in the top half of the first inning, bunting into a fielder's choice. He was removed from the game for a pinch runner, officially keeping the streak alive. But Tejada was then diagnosed with a broken wrist and went to the disabled list, ending his streak at 1,152 games.

== Consecutive innings ==
According to the Society for American Baseball Research, from June 5, 1982, to September 14, 1987, Cal Ripken Jr. played 8,264 consecutive innings, which is believed to be a record, although not one that is officially kept by MLB. The second-longest streak known to have occurred is 5,152 consecutive innings by George Pinkney, who mostly played in the American Association during the record-setting stretch, which lasted from 1885 to 1890.

== Combined Japanese–American streak ==
Hideki Matsui assembled a consecutive games streak of 1,769 games combined between the Japanese league Yomiuri Giants and the Major league New York Yankees. If games in Japan were counted, this would place Matsui behind only Ripken and Gehrig for streaks in Major League Baseball, although other streaks that took place solely in Japan have been longer (Sachio Kinugasa's streak of 2,215 games, which was a world record until broken by Ripken, as well as Takashi Toritani's streak of 1,939 games.) The MLB portion of Matsui's streak lasted for 519 games and is an MLB record for consecutive games to start a player's career. The entire combined streak stretched from August 22, 1993, to May 10, 2006, and was ended by a wrist injury sustained during what was his 519th consecutive game (see above). The MLB portion of the streak extended from March 31, 2003 (opening day), until May 10, 2006.

== See also ==
- Iron man (sports streak)
