= Jack Allen (baseball) =

American baseball player (1855–1915)

- Third baseman
- Born: October 2, 1855; Woodstock, Illinois, U.S.
- Died: April 21, 1915 (aged 59); Girard, Pennsylvania, U.S.
- Batted: Right Threw: Right

MLB debut
- May 1, 1879, for the Syracuse Stars

Last MLB appearance
- 1879, for the Cleveland Blues

MLB statistics
- At bats: 108
- RBI: 7
- Home Runs: 0
- Batting average: .148
- Stats at Baseball Reference

Teams
- Syracuse Stars (1879); Cleveland Blues (1879)

Cyrus Alban Allen (October 2, 1855 – April 21, 1915) was an American professional baseball player who played third base in 1879. He played collegiate ball at Western Reserve University and later got a dental degree at University of Pennsylvania.
