= Fatty Briody =

American baseball player (1858–1903)

- Catcher
- Born: August 13, 1858; Lansingburgh, New York, U.S.
- Died: June 22, 1903 (aged 44); Chicago, Illinois, U.S.
- Batted: Unknown Threw: Right

MLB debut
- June 16, 1880, for the Troy Trojans

Last MLB appearance
- July 24, 1888, for the Kansas City Cowboys (AA)

MLB statistics
- Batting average: .228
- Hits: 271
- RBIs: 115
- Stats at Baseball Reference

Teams
- Troy Trojans (1880); Cleveland Blues (1882–1884); Cincinnati Outlaw Reds (1884); St. Louis Maroons (1885); Kansas City Cowboys (NL) (1886); Detroit Wolverines (1887); Kansas City Cowboys (AA) (1888)

Charles F. "Fatty" Briody (August 13, 1858 – June 22, 1903), nicknamed "Alderman", was an American professional baseball player whose career spanned from 1877 to 1888. He played eight seasons in Major League Baseball— for the Troy Trojans (1880), Cleveland Blues (1882–1884), Cincinnati Outlaw Reds (1884), St. Louis Maroons (1885), Kansas City Cowboys (NL) (1886), Detroit Wolverines (1887) and Kansas City Cowboys (AA) (1888).

== Early years ==
Briody was born in Lansingburgh, New York, four miles outside of Troy, New York. He spent most of his life in Lansingburgh, though he lived in Wisconsin for nine years as a child.

== Professional baseball career ==
=== Minor leagues ===
Briody began his professional baseball career at age 18 playing for the Troy Haymakers of the League Alliance. By 1879, he was playing for New Bedford in the National Association.

On June 16, 1880, Briody received a one-game tryout in the major leagues with the Troy Trojans of the National League. Appearing as the catcher in a 9-5 loss against Cleveland, Briody went hitless in four at bats for a .000 batting average and committed three errors in ten chances for a .700 fielding percentage.

During the 1881 season, Briody played in the Eastern Championship Association for the Washington Nationals and New York Metropolitans.

=== Cleveland Blues ===
Briody played at the catcher position for the Cleveland Blues of the National League from 1882 to 1884. He made his major league debut on June 16, 1882, and appeared in 53 games as the Blues' catcher during the remainder of the 1882 season. He compiled a .258 batting average with 13 doubles and 13 RBIs. He also compiled a .902 fielding percentage with 251 putouts and 89 assists.

In 1883, the Blues acquired catcher Doc Bushong, and Briody became a backup to Bushong. Briody appeared 33 games as a catcher that year and also made appearances at first, second, and third bases. His batting average declined to .234, and his fielding percentage at catcher was .900 with 171 putouts and 46 assists.

At the start of the 1884 season, Briody resumed his role as Bushong's backup. He appeared in 42 games as catcher and improved his fielding percentage to .922 with 243 putouts and 74 assists. However, his batting average declined markedly to .169.

=== Cincinnati Outlaw Reds ===
In the middle of the 1884 season, Briody jumped leagues, joining the Cincinnati Outlaw Reds of the Union Association. In 22games for the Outlaw Reds, Briody's batting average nearly doubled—he compiled a .169 average with Cleveland and hit .337 in 89 at bats for Cincinnati.

=== St. Louis Maroons ===
After his short stint in the Union Association, Briody returned to the National League in 1885, playing for the St. Louis Maroons. He was the Maroons' catcher in 60 games and compiled an .893 fielding percentage with 243 putouts and 83 assists. However, on returning to the National League, Briody's batting average dropped to .195.

=== Kansas City Cowboys ===
In February 1886, St. Louis returned Briody to league control, and he was claimed by the Kansas City Cowboys the following month. Briody played in 54 games as a catcher for the Cowboys, compiling a .919 fielding percentage with 258 putouts and 95 assists. His batting average increased to .237.

=== Detroit Wolverines ===
In March 1887, after the Cowboys folded, Briody was again returned to league control where he was claimed by the Detroit Wolverines. The Wolverines had narrowly missed winning the 1886 National League pennant and were loaded with talent, including future Hall of Famers Dan Brouthers, Sam Thompson, and Ned Hanlon. Briody played in 33 games as the team's catcher, serving as the back-up to Charlie Ganzel and Charlie Bennett. Briody was suspended mid-season for drunkenness. The Wolverines won the National League pennant in 1887 and went on to defeat the St. Louis Browns in the 1887 World Series. Briody compiled a .227 batting average for Detroit.

=== Return to Kansas City ===
In 1888, Briody played his final season in the major leagues with the Kansas City Cowboys of the American Association. He appeared in only 13 games for the Cowboys in 1888, compiling an .896 fielding percentage and a .208 batting average.

=== Career statistics ===
In his eight-year major league career, Briody appeared in 323 games and compiled a .228 batting average with 52 doubles, seven triples, three home runs and 115 RBIs. Defensively, he was the catcher in 311 games and compiled a .910 fielding percentage with 1,560 putouts, 506 assists, 204 errors and 31 double plays.

== Later years ==
After his playing career was over, Briody returned to Lansinburgh, New York, where he was the Committeeman for the Seventeenth Ward for many years. He also conducted a trucking business, doing work for various companies. He died in 1903 at age 44 of dilation of the heart.
