= Pit Gilman =

American baseball player (1864–1950)

- Outfielder
- Born: March 14, 1864; Laporte, Ohio
- Died: August 17, 1950 (aged 86); Elyria, Ohio
- Batted: Left Threw: Left

MLB debut
- September 18, 1884, for the Cleveland Blues

Last MLB appearance
- September 20, 1884, for the Cleveland Blues

MLB statistics
- Games: 2
- At bats: 10
- Hits: 1

Teams
- Cleveland Blues (1884)

Pitkin Clark "Pit" Gilman (March 14, 1864 – August 17, 1950) was a Major League Baseball player. Gilman played for Cleveland Blues in the 1884 season. He only played in two games in his one-year career, having one hit in ten at-bats.

Gilman was born in Laporte, Ohio and died in Elyria, Ohio.
