= David Hall (footballer) =

English footballer

Personal information
- Full name: David Henry Hall
- Date of birth: 16 March 1954 (age 72)
- Place of birth: Sheffield, England
- Position: Midfielder

Youth career
- Sheffield Wednesday

Senior career*
Years	Team	Apps	(Gls)
1975–1977	Bradford City	54	(3)
–	Mossley	?	(?)
- * Club domestic league appearances and goals

David Henry Hall (born 16 March 1954) is an English former professional footballer who played as a midfielder during the 1970s.

== Career ==
After beginning as a trainee at Sheffield Wednesday, Hall began his senior career at Bradford City, where he made 54 appearances in the Football League between 1975 and 1977. He later played non-League football with Mossley.
