= Mike Muldoon =

Baseball player (1858–after 1890)

- Third baseman
- Born: April 9, 1858; Ballyloughloe, County Westmeath, Ireland
- Died: Unknown
- Batted: Unknown Threw: Unknown

MLB debut
- May 1, 1882, for the Cleveland Blues

Last MLB appearance
- October 10, 1886, for the Baltimore Orioles
- Stats at Baseball Reference

Teams
- Cleveland Blues (1882–1884); Baltimore Orioles (1885–1886)

Michael D. Muldoon (April 9, 1858 – after 1890) was a Major League Baseball player. Muldoon played for the Cleveland Blues and the Baltimore Orioles. The last confirmed mention of him is in 1890. His later life, date of death, and final resting place are unknown.
