= Hugh Daily =

American baseball player (1847-after 1923)

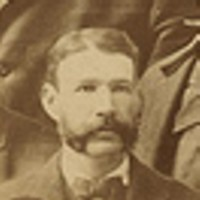
- Daily in 1882
- Pitcher
- Born: July 17, 1847; Crosserlough, Ireland
- Died: Unknown; last confirmed alive in 1923
- Batted: Right Threw: Right

Major league debut
- May 1, 1882, for the Buffalo Bisons

Last major league appearance
- August 21, 1887, for the Cleveland Blues

Major league statistics
- Win–loss record: 73–87
- Earned run average: 2.92
- Strikeouts: 846
- Stats at Baseball Reference

Teams
- Buffalo Bisons (1882); Cleveland Blues (1883); Chicago Browns (1884); Washington Nationals (1884); St. Louis Maroons (1885); Washington Nationals (1886); Cleveland Blues (1887)

Career highlights and awards
- Pitched a no-hitter on September 13, 1883; UA strikeout leader (1884)

Hugh Ignatius Daily (July 17, 1847 – after 1923), nicknamed "One Arm", was an American professional right-handed pitcher who played six seasons, for seven different teams; the Buffalo Bisons, the Cleveland Blues, and the St. Louis Maroons of the National League, Chicago Browns and Washington Nationals of the Union Association, and the Cleveland Blues of the American Association. He was known for having a surly disposition and was not well liked by baseball executives, which occasioned his frequent change of teams. However, he was a favorite of fans wherever he played.

Daily was successful as a starting pitcher early in his major league career. In 1883 and 1884, he won 20 or more games each season, while finishing in the top ten among league leaders in major pitching categories such as earned run average (as calculated retroactively, since ERA was not an official statistic at the time), innings pitched, complete games, and strikeouts. Daily established the pitching record for strikeouts in a season (later surpassed), tied a record by tossing two consecutive one-hitters, broke the record for one-hitters in a season, and threw a no-hitter. After his initial three years of success, the final three years of his career were marked by quick decline in his seasonal numbers, and he was gone from organized baseball shortly thereafter. Today he remains a mysterious figure, as there is little record of his activities after his career. It is unclear where he lived and where he died.

== Nickname and disposition ==
His nickname, "One Arm" Daily, is a reference to his left arm; he had lost his left hand to a gun accident earlier in his life. To compensate for this injury, he fixed a special pad over the affected area and caught the baseball by trapping it between the pad and his right hand. Sometimes, after long games of having to catch baseballs this way, his stump would become sensitive – so sensitive in fact, that he once punched his catcher for not heeding his warning to throw the balls back to him softer.

Daily was well known for having a bad disposition, he has been described as surly, and having a volatile temper. Other sources add to that: mean, contemptuous, and uncommunicative. While this behaviour was not well liked by the baseball establishment, he was popular with the home crowds because of his verbal tirades against umpires and opposing players alike.

Some theories attempt to explain Daily's tempestuous behaviour, one of which was put forth by Frank Vaccaro in his 1999 edition of The National Pastime. His theory explains that, in Daily's day, except in cases of injury, for a pitcher to be relieved from his position, another player already in the game would have to relieve him, and the pitcher would have to take a position in the field. His physical condition did not allow him many opportunities to play any other positions, so this compelled his managers to leave him in the game longer, even when his performance was declining. He was allowed to play in the field on several occasions, when the situation warranted it, as he is credited as playing three games in the outfield, two at second base, and one at shortstop.

== Early career ==
Daily was born in Crosserlough, Ireland. He and his parents emigrated to America when Daily was young, settling in Baltimore. He first began playing baseball professionally around the Baltimore area, often receiving more lucrative offers to play in more prominent leagues, all of which he declined, preferring to stay in the local area. His reputation, along with actions such as verbally assaulting umpires and fans, forced him to move on to other teams, which landed him in New York City playing for the Metropolitans, which was an all-professional club but had yet to join a major league; they later joined the American Association in 1883. He became the team's ace pitcher, winning 38 games, including notable victories against Cap Anson's Chicago White Stockings, and most of the other top professional teams in the country at the time.

== Major league career ==
Daily's performance that season caught the eye of Major League teams, and he signed with the Buffalo Bisons for the 1882 season. Although he shared starts with future Hall of Famer Pud Galvin, he was able to pitch in 29 games, winning 15 of them. He was playing for the Cleveland Blues of the National League when he pitched a no-hitter on 13 September 1883 against the Philadelphia Quakers, a 1–0 victory. He finished the season with a 23–19 win–loss record, and finished in the top ten in several pitching categories. He finished second in the league with two shutouts, fifth place with a 2.42 earned run average, seventh in strikeouts with 171, and ninth in the league in wins, games pitched, and games started. However, he did lead the league with 99 walks – a remarkable total, given that in 1882 and 1883 walks were issued after seven balls rather than four.

For the 1884 season, he feasted on the upstart Union Association's lack of talent, pitching for the Chicago Browns (which became the Pittsburgh Stogies), and for the Washington Nationals later in the season. He finished with a 28–28 win–loss record, but did have a low 2.43 ERA, and set a few records in that lone season for the Association. Daily struck out a total of 483 batters that season, a record that was surpassed only in 1886 by both Matt Kilroy (513), and Toad Ramsey (499). Among the season totals, he struck out 19 batters in a game, on 7 July, tying Charlie Sweeney. Unofficially, his reported 19 strikeout game was upgraded to 20 when it was discovered that one batter had struck out but reached first base when the pitch got away from the catcher. This meant that Daily did not just tie the record, but broke it instead (Roger Clemens then unofficially tied the mark in 1986). Daily added one more record that season; he set the record for most one-hitters in one season, with four, two of them back to back, which was also itself a record at the time. The record was later matched by Grover Cleveland Alexander in 1915.

When the Union Association dissolved, Daily had to pay a $500 fine to regain his major league eligibility for the 1885 season, as did all the players who jumped to this new league and were subsequently blacklisted. He joined the St. Louis Maroons of the National League, where he only pitched in 11 games, and had a record of 3 wins and 8 losses. The rest of his career included short stints with the 1886 Washington Nationals, and the 1887 Cleveland Blues of the American Association. He played his final major league game on 21 August 1887.

== Later life ==
Very few facts are known about his personal life or where and when he died. In the 1910 United States census, he was recorded as living in Baltimore with two sisters and working as a clerk for a customs house. According to the 1920 United States census, he was living with his sister, and was a clerk for a hotel. His last known location was 1923 in Baltimore, living at 123 North Washington Street.

== See also ==
- List of Major League Baseball single-game strikeout leaders
- List of Major League Baseball no-hitters

== Notes ==
Achievements
Preceded by Charles Radbourn	No-hitter pitcher 13 September 1883	Succeeded by Al Atkinson
