= George Fisher (baseball) =

American baseball player (1855–1937)

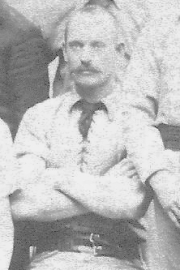
- Utility player
- Born: August 20, 1855; Wilmington, Delaware
- Died: January 29, 1937 (aged 81); Oakland, California
- Batted: Left Threw: Unknown

MLB debut
- August 9, 1884, for the Cleveland Blues

Last MLB appearance
- September 12, 1884, for the Wilmington Quicksteps

MLB statistics
- Batting average: .094
- At bats: 53
- Hits: 5
- Stats at Baseball Reference

Teams
- Cleveland Blues (NL) (1884); Wilmington Quicksteps (1884)

George Cresse Fisher (August 20, 1855 – January 29, 1937) was a Major League Baseball player. He played 14 games at five positions for two teams in two leagues in 1884. Fisher played most of his games at second base (six games for the National League Cleveland Blues) or in center field (six games for the Union Association Wilmington Quicksteps).
