= Jerry Moore (baseball) =

Canadian baseball player (1855–1890)

- Catcher
- Born: c. 1855; Windsor, Canada West, British Empire
- Died: September 26, 1890; Wayne, Michigan, U.S.
- Batted: Left Threw: Unknown

MLB debut
- April 17, 1884, for the Altoona Mountain City

Last MLB appearance
- May 28, 1885, for the Detroit Wolverines

MLB statistics
- Batting average: .263
- Home runs: 1
- Runs batted in: 10
- Stats at Baseball Reference

Teams
- Altoona Mountain City (1884); Cleveland Blues (1884); Detroit Wolverines (1885)

Jeremiah S. Moore (c. 1855 – September 26, 1890) was a Major League Baseball (MLB) catcher and outfielder in the 19th century. He was a native of Windsor, Ontario, Canada. In 1884 he played for the Altoona Mountain City of the Union Association and the Cleveland Blues of the National League. In 1885 he played for the Detroit Wolverines, also of the National League.

In 20 Union Association games he batted .312 (25-for-80), but in 15 National League games he hit only .189 (10-for-53). In 35 total major league games he had a .263 batting average with 13 runs scored.

Moore died at the age of 34 or 35 in Wayne, Michigan.
