= Joe Ardner =

American baseball player (1858–1935)

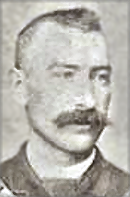
- Second baseman
- Born: February 27, 1858; Mt. Vernon, Ohio, U.S.
- Died: September 15, 1935 (aged 77); Cleveland, Ohio, U.S.
- Batted: Right Threw: Right

MLB debut
- May 1, 1884, for the Cleveland Blues

Last MLB appearance
- August 18, 1890, for the Cleveland Spiders

MLB statistics
- Batting average: .212
- Hits: 88
- Runs batted in: 39
- Stats at Baseball Reference

Teams
- Cleveland Blues (1884); Cleveland Spiders (1890)

Joseph A. "Old Hoss" Ardner (February 27, 1858 – September 15, 1935) was an American second baseman in Major League Baseball (MLB). He played two non-consecutive seasons for Cleveland teams – the Cleveland Blues in 1884 and the Cleveland Spiders in 1890.

He was buried at Woodland Cemetery in Cleveland.
