= Bill Smith (outfielder) =

American baseball player (1865–1886)

- Left fielder
- Born: 1865; Cleveland, Ohio, United States
- Died: August 9, 1886 (aged 20–21); Toronto, Ontario, Canada
- Batted: Unknown Threw: Unknown

MLB debut
- September 17, 1884, for the Cleveland Blues

Last MLB appearance
- September 17, 1884, for the Cleveland Blues

MLB statistics
- Batting average: .000
- Home runs: 0
- Runs batted in: 0
- Games played: 1
- Stats at Baseball Reference

Teams
- Cleveland Blues (1884)

William E. Smith (1865 – August 9, 1886) was a Major League Baseball player, who appeared in one game for the 1884 Cleveland Blues of the National League as their left fielder. While in Toronto playing for the Toronto Canucks, Smith was diving in the Toronto Islands on August 9, 1886 when he jumped on a friend's back and, after his friend moved from beneath him, fell forward, hitting his head on the bottom and fatally dislocating his neck.
