= Pete Hotaling =

American baseball player (1856–1928)

- Center fielder
- Born: December 16, 1856; Mohawk, New York, U.S.
- Died: July 2, 1928 (aged 71); Cleveland, Ohio, U.S.
- Batted: Left Threw: Right

MLB debut
- May 1, 1879, for the Cincinnati Reds

Last MLB appearance
- September 15, 1888, for the Cleveland Blues

MLB statistics
- Batting average: .267
- Runs scored: 590
- Runs batted in: 371
- Stats at Baseball Reference

Teams
- Cincinnati Reds (1879); Cleveland Blues (1880); Worcester Ruby Legs (1881); Boston Red Caps (1882); Cleveland Blues (1883–1884); Brooklyn Grays (1885); Cleveland Blues (1887–1888)

Peter James Hotaling (December 16, 1856 – July 2, 1928), nicknamed "Monkey", was an American center fielder in Major League Baseball from 1879 to 1888. He has been described as one of the earliest journeymen in professional baseball. When he played catcher in the minor leagues in 1877, he was one of the first men to wear a catcher's mask.

== Early life ==
Hotaling was born in Mohawk, New York.

He suffered an eye injury while catching a minor league baseball game. When he came back weeks later with a catcher's mask on, his teammates gave him the nickname "Monkey".

== Career ==
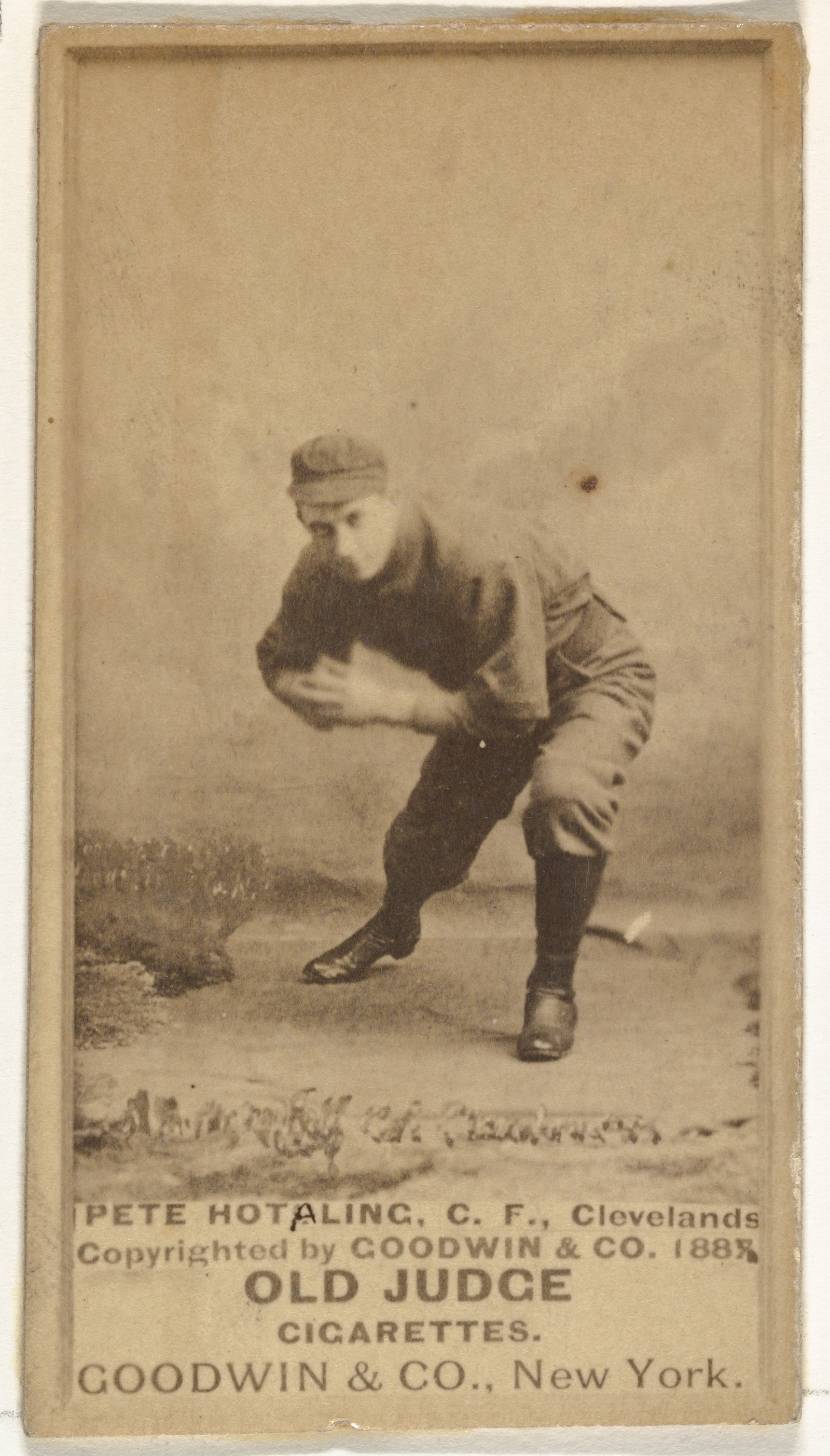
Pete "Monkey" Hotaling, from the Old Judge series (N172), Metropolitan Museum of Art

Hotaling was promoted to the major leagues in 1879, playing 81 games for the Cincinnati Reds, mostly in the outfield. He changed teams every year through 1882, playing for the Cleveland Blues, Worcester Ruby Legs and Boston Red Caps in that span, before returning to the Blues for 1883 and 1884.

Hotaling spent 1885 with the Brooklyn Grays, but he was in the Southern League in 1886 with its Savannah club. After that season, Savannah sought to make Hotaling its manager, but he returned to Cleveland to play for the American Association team known as the Blues. Hotaling got the most major league playing time in 1887, when he appeared in 126 games, all in the outfield.

He had one of his best games during his second and final season with the AA's Blues. On June 6, 1888, Hotaling batted seven times and got six hits (five singles and a triple). Sixteen AA players had a six-hit game in the span of eight years, but Hotaling had the only six-hit game by a Cleveland player.

After spending almost all of the preceding decade in the major leagues, Hotaling played his last professional season in 1889, appearing with the St. Joseph Clay Eaters of the Western Association and the Chattanooga team in the Southern League.

== After baseball ==
Hotaling had graduated from Eastman Business College in Poughkeepsie, New York, and he worked as a grocer and then as a machinist for White Motor Company. Ten years after the end of his baseball days, Hotaling was apparently still living in Cleveland, as a 1908 newspaper article mentioned his participation in an exhibition game pitting local former Cleveland players against an area amateur team.

He died of lobar pneumonia in Cleveland at the age of 71. He is interred at Lake View Cemetery in Cleveland.

== See also ==
- List of Major League Baseball single-game hits leaders
