= Ernie Burch =

American baseball player (1856–1892)

Earnest A. Burch
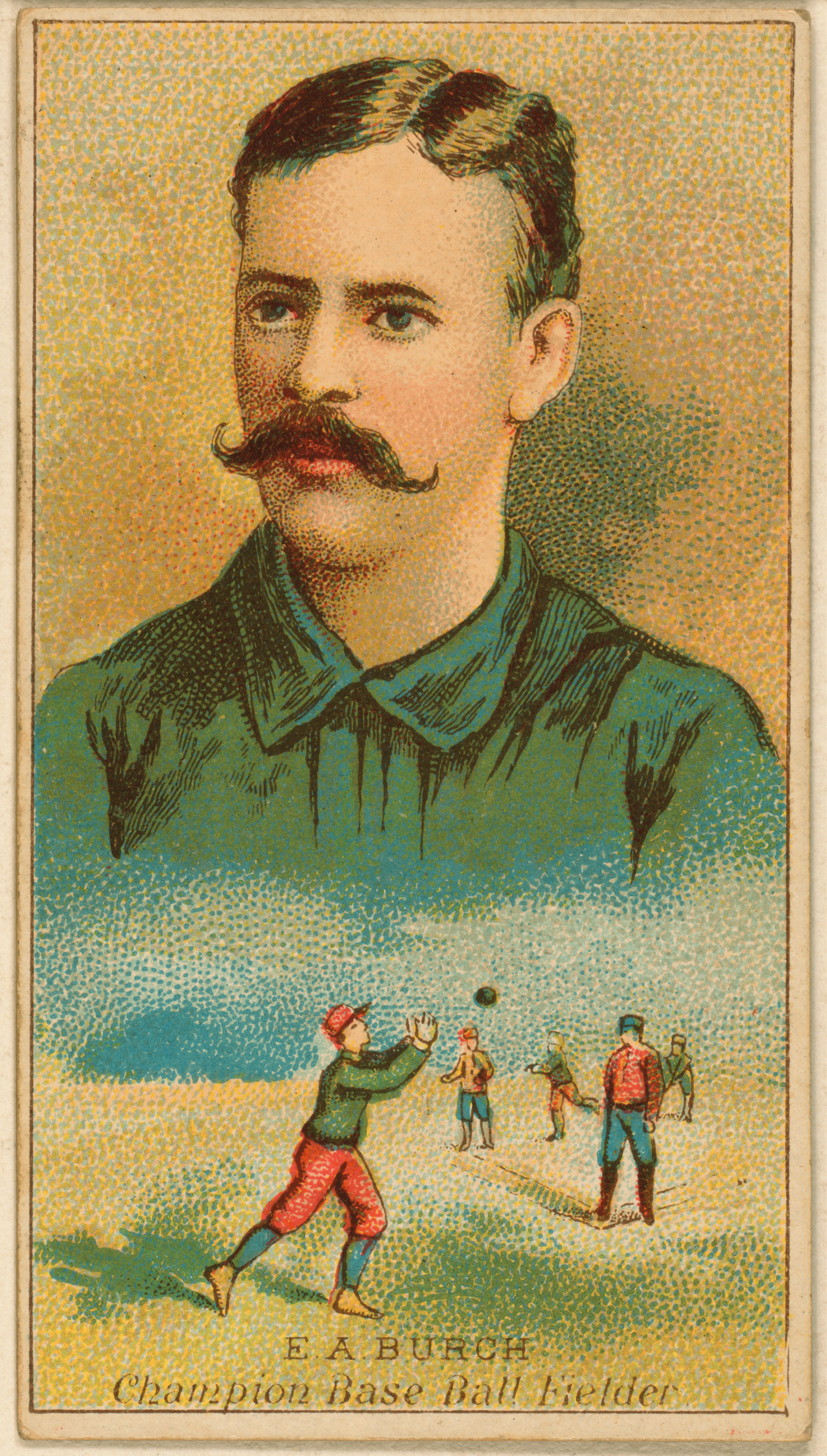
- Outfielder
- Born: September 9, 1856; DeKalb County, Illinois, U.S.
- Died: October 12, 1892 (aged 36); Guthrie, Oklahoma, U.S.
- Batted: Left Threw: Unknown

MLB debut
- August 15, 1884, for the Cleveland Blues

Last MLB appearance
- July 10, 1887, for the Brooklyn Grays

MLB statistics
- Batting average: .260
- Runs scored: 134
- Runs batted in: 105
- Stats at Baseball Reference

Teams
- Cleveland Blues (1884); Brooklyn Grays (1886–1887)

Earnest A. Burch (September 9, 1856 – October 12, 1892) was an American professional baseball outfielder who played in Major League Baseball from 1884 to 1887.

Burch was born in DeKalb County, Illinois. He played for the Cleveland Blues and Brooklyn Grays. He died in Guthrie, Oklahoma.

== Sources ==
- Career statistics from Baseball Reference · Baseball Reference (Minors) · Retrosheet · Baseball Almanac
- Baseball Almanac
