= Jake Evans (baseball) =

American baseball player (1856–1907)

- Right fielder
- Born: September 22, 1856; Baltimore, Maryland, U.S.
- Died: January 16, 1907 (aged 50); Baltimore, Maryland, U.S.
- Batted: Unknown Threw: Right

MLB debut
- May 1, 1879, for the Troy Trojans

Last MLB appearance
- May 19, 1885, for the Baltimore Orioles

MLB statistics
- Batting average: .238
- Home runs: 1
- Runs batted in: 168
- Stats at Baseball Reference

Teams
- Troy Trojans (1879–1881); Worcester Ruby Legs (1882); Cleveland Blues (1883–1884); Baltimore Orioles (1885)

Uriah L. P. "Bloody Jake" Evans (September 22, 1856 – January 16, 1907) was an American right fielder in Major League Baseball from 1879 to 1885. Evans played for the Troy Trojans, Worcester Ruby Legs, Cleveland Blues, and Baltimore Orioles. He was 5 feet 8 inches (1.73 m) tall and weighed 154 pounds (70 kg).

== Career ==
Evans was born in Baltimore, Maryland, in 1856. He started his professional baseball career in 1877, playing for the Rhode Islands of the New England League. The following season, he played in the International Association.

In 1879, Evans joined the National League's Troy Trojans, making his major league debut on May 1. He played 72 games that season and hit .232 with 17 runs batted in. Evans never had an OPS+ total above 98 in the majors, but he was a good outfielder with a strong throwing arm. Among outfielders, he finished among the league leaders in several defensive categories as a rookie; he was second in assists (30), second in range factor (2.54), third in putouts (153), and fifth in fielding percentage (.884).

In 1880 and 1881, Evans batted .256 and .241, respectively. He then played for the Worcester Ruby Legs in 1882. His batting average dropped to a career-low .213, but he led all National League outfielders in assists with 31. He moved on to the Cleveland Blues in 1883, where he was praised for his fielding. ("Give Jake Evans plenty of pie, a comfortable siesta and his favorite dhundeen [cigar] and he'll play right second to none.")

In 1884, Evans' right arm popped out of its socket as he was throwing the ball in from right field, leaving his arm in a "fragile condition." Evans played the rest of the year wearing a fitted rubber cap on his arm to keep it from popping back out, and he batted a career-high .259 while leading the National League's outfielders in fielding percentage (.917). However, that was his last full season in professional baseball.

Evans played 20 games for the Baltimore Orioles in 1885 before retiring from the game at the age of 28. He died in Baltimore in 1907 and was buried in Baltimore Cemetery.
