= Willie Murphy (baseball) =

American baseball player (1864–??)

- Outfielder
- Born: March 23, 1864; Springfield, Massachusetts, U.S.
- Died: Unknown
- Batted: Left Threw: Unknown

MLB debut
- May 1, 1884, for the Cleveland Blues

Last MLB appearance
- August 2, 1884, for the Washington Nationals

MLB statistics
- Games: 47
- At bats: 189
- Hits: 48
- Stats at Baseball Reference

Teams
- Cleveland Blues (1884); Washington Nationals (1884)

William H. Murphy (born March 23, 1864 – unknown), nicknamed "Gentle Willie", was an American Major League Baseball player, who played outfield in 1884 for the Cleveland Blues of the National League and the Washington Nationals of the American Association.
