= George Strief =

American baseball player (1856–1946)

- Second baseman / Outfielder
- Born: October 16, 1856; Cincinnati, Ohio, U.S.
- Died: April 1, 1946 (aged 89); Cleveland, Ohio, U.S.
- Batted: Right Threw: Right

MLB debut
- May 1, 1879, for the Cleveland Blues

Last MLB appearance
- May 8, 1885, for the Philadelphia Athletics

MLB statistics
- Batting average: .207
- Home runs: 5
- Runs batted in: 64
- Stats at Baseball Reference

Teams
- Cleveland Blues (1879); Pittsburgh Alleghenys (1882); St. Louis Browns (1883–1884); Kansas City Cowboys (1884); Chicago Browns/Pittsburgh Stogies (1884); Cleveland Blues (1884); Philadelphia Athletics (1885)

George Andrew Strief (October 16, 1856 – April 1, 1946) was an American professional baseball second baseman and outfielder. Strief played in Major League Baseball (MLB) from 1879 to 1885 for the Cleveland Blues, Pittsburgh Alleghenys, St. Louis Browns, Kansas City Cowboys, Chicago Browns/Pittsburgh Stogies, and Philadelphia Athletics.

On May 3, 1882, Strief hit the first-ever home run in Pittsburgh Pirates history. Strief's home run came five years before the Pirates (then called the Pittsburgh Alleghenys) entered the National League. Until 1887, the club was a member of the American Association, and Strief's home run was against the Cincinnati Red Stockings in a 7-3 Pittsburgh loss. The game was only second, and first loss, in franchise history.

Strief set the record for most triples in a game, four, in 1885 (equalled by Bill Joyce in 1897). Also in 1885 he became the first player to collect five extra base hits in a game.

== See also ==
- List of Major League Baseball triples records
