= David Aiken Hall =

American lawyer (1795–1870)

Secretary of the Whig National Committee
- In office 1851–1852

Personal details
- Born: October 16, 1795 Grafton, Vermont, U.S.
- Died: December 24, 1870 (aged 75) Washington, D.C., U.S.
- Resting place: Congressional Cemetery
- Party: Whig
- Children: 6, including Maria M. C. Hall
- Education: Middlebury College
- Occupation: Lawyer, politician, author

David Aiken Hall (October 16, 1795 – December 24, 1870) was an American attorney, author, and politician, most well known as a lawyer to enslaved African Americans, including the crew and slaves of The Pearl.

== Early life and family ==
David Aiken Hall was born on October 16, 1795, in Grafton, Vermont. After graduating from Middlebury College, he moved to Washington, D.C., to study law with Elias B. Caldwell.

=== Marriages and children ===
Hall was married three times: to Susan Apthorp Bulfinch (1790–1829) in 1821, Martha Maria Condict (1807–1836) in 1834, and Abigail Wolcott Ellsworth (1814–1874) in 1838.

He had 6 children who lived into adulthood, including:

- Maria M. C. Hall (1836–1912), American Civil War nurse
- Ellen Ellsworth Hall Curtis (1840–1900)
- Alice Lindsley Hall Wyckoff (1842–1920)
- William Frederick Hall (1844–1900)
- Martin Ellsworth Hall (1847–1904), Commander, U.S. Navy
- Martha Wolcott Hall Hitchcock (1856–1903)

== Career ==
Hall was admitted to the Bar in 1820 and was a prominent attorney in the Washington, D.C. area. He was an acquaintance of former presidents Thomas Jefferson and James Monroe upon his arrival to the region. In 1824, Hall was a lieutenant of a company organized to welcome General Lafayette on the occasion of his visit to Washington.

He served for several years as executor of the James Greenleaf estate. Among his close associates and friends were Daniel Webster and Stephen A. Douglas. Hall became known for representing a large number of enslaved African Americans and saving them from being sold and separated from their families. In 1828, Bushrod Washington wrote Hall regarding a legal matter. Hall was a close friend of Daniel Webster, with whom he often partnered on legal cases. He was also a neighbor and associate of abolitionist editor Gamaliel Bailey.

In 1832, Hall co-wrote Legislative and Documentary History of the Bank of the United States with Matthew St. Clair Clarke (Clerk of the United States House of Representatives), a work which was praised by James Madison.

In the late 1840s, he provided legal representation as one of the lead attorneys for the crew and enslaved persons of The Pearl. Hall was an active member of the Whig party, and served as secretary of the Whig National Committee during the 1852 presidential election. He was a strong opponent of slavery.

== Works ==
- A Digested Index of the Laws of the Corporation of the City of Washington, 1829
- Legislative and Documentary History of the Bank of the United States, 1832 (co-authored with Matthew St. Clair Clarke)
- Cases of Contested Elections in Congress 1789 to 1834, 1834 (co-authored with Matthew St. Clair Clarke)

== Death and legacy ==
Hall died in 1870 aged 75. He is interred at the Congressional Cemetery. Hall's grave is recognized with a historical marker as part of the National Underground Railroad Network to Freedom.
