= Charlie Hackett =

American baseball manager

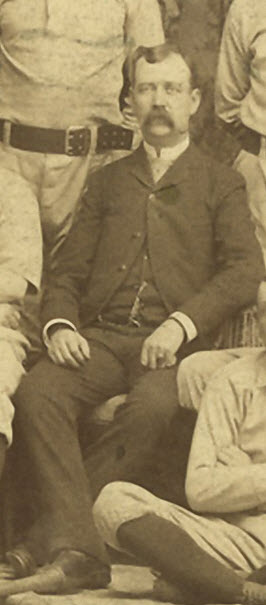
- Manager
- Born: 1855; Lee, Massachusetts, U.S.
- Died: August 1, 1898 (aged 42–43); Holyoke, Massachusetts, U.S.
- Batted: Unknown Threw: Unknown

MLB debut
- May 1, 1884, for the Cleveland Blues

Last MLB appearance
- June 13, 1885, for the Brooklyn Grays

MLB statistics
- Games Managed: 150
- Win–loss record: 50–99
- Winning %: .336

Teams
- Cleveland Blues (NL) (1884); Brooklyn Grays (1885)

Charles Michael Hackett (1855 – August 1, 1898) was an American professional baseball manager for two seasons in Major League Baseball. First of the 1884 Cleveland Blues National League (NL), then of the Brooklyn Grays in 1885.
