= George Pinkney =

American baseball player (1859–1926)

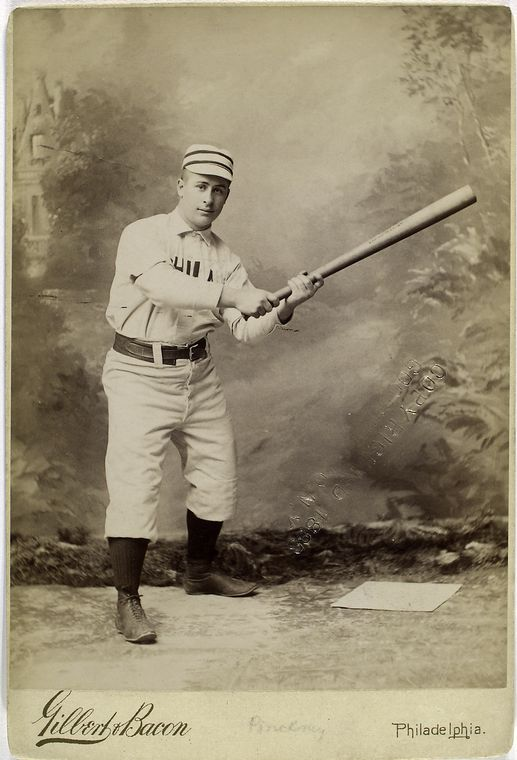
- Third baseman
- Born: January 11, 1859; Orange Prairie, Peoria, Illinois, U.S.
- Died: November 10, 1926 (aged 67); Peoria, Illinois, U.S.
- Batted: Right Threw: Right

MLB debut
- August 16, 1884, for the Cleveland Blues

Last MLB appearance
- September 29, 1893, for the Louisville Colonels

MLB statistics
- Batting average: .263
- Hits: 1,212
- Runs: 874
- Stats at Baseball Reference

Teams
- Cleveland Blues (1884); Brooklyn Grays / Bridegrooms / Grooms (1885–1891); St. Louis Browns (1892); Louisville Colonels (1893)

George Burton Pinkney (January 11, 1859 – November 10, 1926) was an American professional baseball player. He played primarily as a third baseman in the National League and American Association during 1884–1893, and was the first player to appear in 500 consecutive major-league games.

== Career ==
Pinkney led the American Association (AA) in games (141), at bats (597), and walks (70) in 1886. He led the AA in games (143), runs (134), times on base (234), and outs (419) in 1888. Pinkney helped the Bridegrooms win the 1889 AA pennant and the 1890 National League (NL) pennant.

In 10 seasons, Pinkney played in 1,163 games and had 4,610 at-bats, 874 runs, 1,212 hits, 170 doubles, 56 triples, 21 home runs, 539 RBI, 526 walks, .263 batting average, .345 on-base percentage, .338 slugging percentage, and 1,557 total bases. When he retired, he held the major-league record for most consecutive games played, at 577, and innings played, at 5,152. Both records have since been surpassed, the innings played mark standing for 95 years until it was broken by Cal Ripken Jr. Pinkney remained the only major-league player to play in more than 500 consecutive games until Fred Luderus played in 533 games.

Following his release from Louisville in 1894, Pinkney briefly played for the Grand Rapids Rustlers in the new, Ban Johnson-constituted Western League, a minor league. Illness and injury leading to poor play in the field, Pinkney was cut from the Rustlers by July of that year. He left baseball, returned to Peoria, Illinois, with his wife, Cora. Pinkney spent the remainder of his working life as a clerk and chief auditor on the Peoria and Pekin Union Railway, and was an occasional scout.

Pinkne died in Peoria at the age of 67 and was interred at Springdale Cemetery.

== See also ==
- List of Major League Baseball consecutive games played leaders
- List of Major League Baseball career stolen bases leaders
- List of Major League Baseball annual runs scored leaders
- List of Major League Baseball single-game hits leaders

== Sources ==
- Career statistics from Baseball Reference · Baseball Reference (Minors) · Retrosheet · Baseball Almanac
- Baseball Almanac
- Society for American Baseball Research Archived 2016-01-15 at the Wayback Machine
- Glenn Stout; Richard A. Johnson; Dick Johnson (2004). The Dodgers. Houghton Mifflin Books. p. 407. ISBN 0-618-21355-4. "george pinkney baseball."
