= Doc Bushong =

American baseball player (1856–1908)

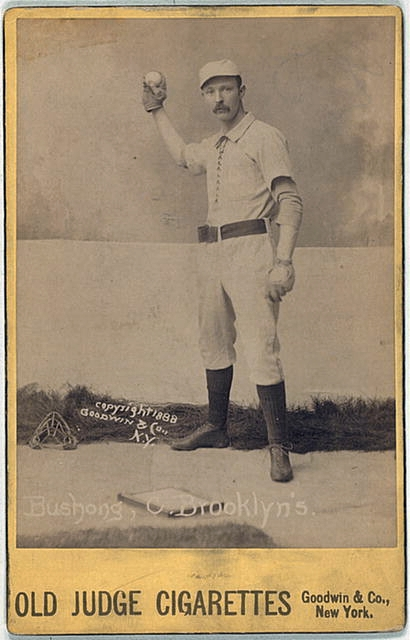
- Catcher
- Born: September 15, 1856; Philadelphia, Pennsylvania, U.S.
- Died: August 19, 1908 (aged 51); Brooklyn, New York, U.S.
- Batted: Right Threw: Right

Major-league debut
- July 19, 1875, for the Brooklyn Atlantics

Last major-league appearance
- September 9, 1890, for the Brooklyn Bridegrooms

Major-league statistics
- Batting average: .214
- Home runs: 2
- Runs batted in: 184
- Stats at Baseball Reference

Teams
- Brooklyn Atlantics (1875); Philadelphia Athletics (1876); Worcester Ruby Legs (1880–1882); Cleveland Blues (1883–1884); St. Louis Browns (1885–1887); Brooklyn Bridegrooms (1888–1890)

Career highlights and awards
- 4× AA champion (1885–1887, 1889); NL champion (1890)

Albert John Bushong (September 15, 1856 – August 19, 1908), known as Doc Bushong, was an American professional baseball catcher. Bushong also made appearances as an umpire and after his retirement from baseball, he practiced as a dentist. Some sources credit him with the invention of the catcher's mitt.

== Early life ==
Descended from the Colonial immigrant Bushong family, Albert John Bushong was born September 15, 1856, in Philadelphia, the son of Charles A. Bushong and Margaret Moore Bushong. (Note: Albert Bushong is descended from Hans and Barbara Bushong, the 1731 German-Swiss immigrants to Pennsylvania through their grandson, Jacob Bushong and his wife Elizabeth Rutter.) Bushong attended public schools in Philadelphia and graduated from Central High School in 1876. After playing baseball in various minor league teams for a couple of years, he enrolled in 1878 in dental school at the University of Pennsylvania. Bushong was one of the first to matriculate in the brand-new Department of Dentistry and he received his D.D.S. in 1882. While attending dental school, he played professional baseball every year, catching in more than 230 games as well as "barnstorming" in the off-season with a different team, the Hop Bitters. Bushong was the first University of Pennsylvania graduate to play in Major League baseball. He did not play ball for the university, as he was already playing pro-ball. Shortly after graduation Albert J. Bushong and Theresa M. Gottery were married and together they had seven children.

== Baseball career ==
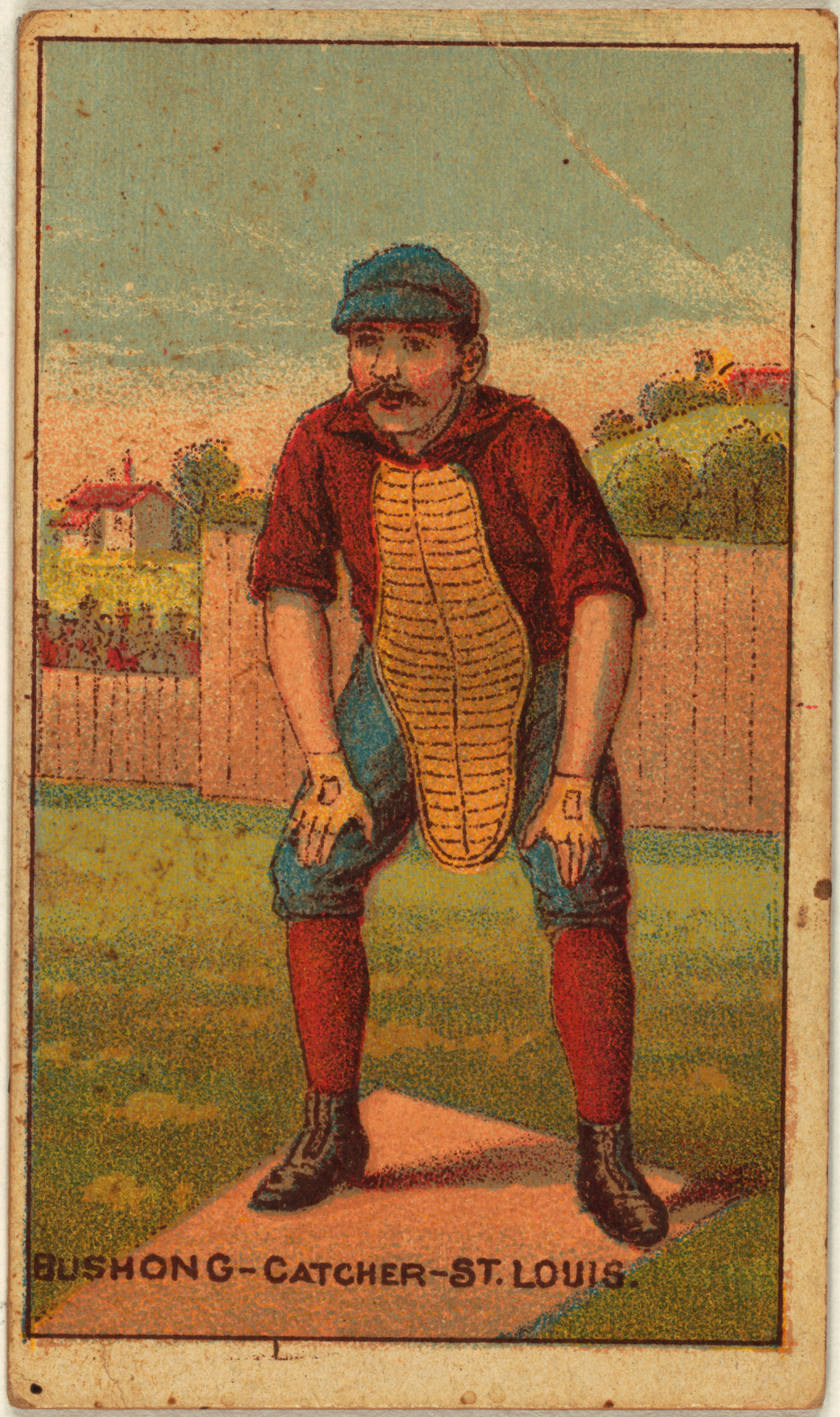
Doc Bushong on an 1887 baseball card.

His baseball career, spanned from 1875 to 1891, and Bushong played on various professional minor- and major-league teams, including the Brooklyn Atlantics (1875), Philadelphia Athletics (1876), Worcester Ruby Legs (1880–82), Cleveland Blues (1883–84), St. Louis Browns (1885–87), and Brooklyn Bridegrooms (1888–90).

Some believe his greatest success came in the latter part of his career, when Bushong played on five pennant winning teams and was in postseason play five times. His most notable performance is most likely with the 1886 St. Louis Browns of the American Association when they beat the Chicago White Stockings of the National League, for the Championship (later called World Series). For his part in the championship, in 1886, the Missouri Pacific Railroad, honored Bushong and several other players by renaming some of their whistle-stop towns. The town of Weeks in Kansas, became, Bushong, Kansas.

In 1887 Bushong became one of the first baseball players to do paid product endorsements, in an advertisement for Merrell's Penetrating Oil, which was a cold medicine. Leading up to the 1888 season, Bushong made news again, when Chris von der Ahe owner of the St. Louis Browns sold the contracts for Bushong, along with pitcher "Parisian Bob" Caruthers, and first baseman/outfielder/pitcher Dave Foutz. The sale was to the Brooklyn Bridegrooms and their owner, Charlie Byrne who paid, what was then, the enormous sum of $19,000 for the trio.

On July 4, 1889, in the second game of a doubleheader in St. Louis, Bushong injured his arm and played in only two more games during the regular season. He never fully recovered from the injury, which marked the beginning of the end of his baseball career. The 1890 season, was Bushong's last on the Bridegrooms and in major league baseball and he was officially released on March 26, 1891. Within a couple of weeks still wanting to play for the 1891 season, Bushong signed on with a minor-league team and eventually played on two different teams through mid-July before he was released.

=== Catcher's mitt ===
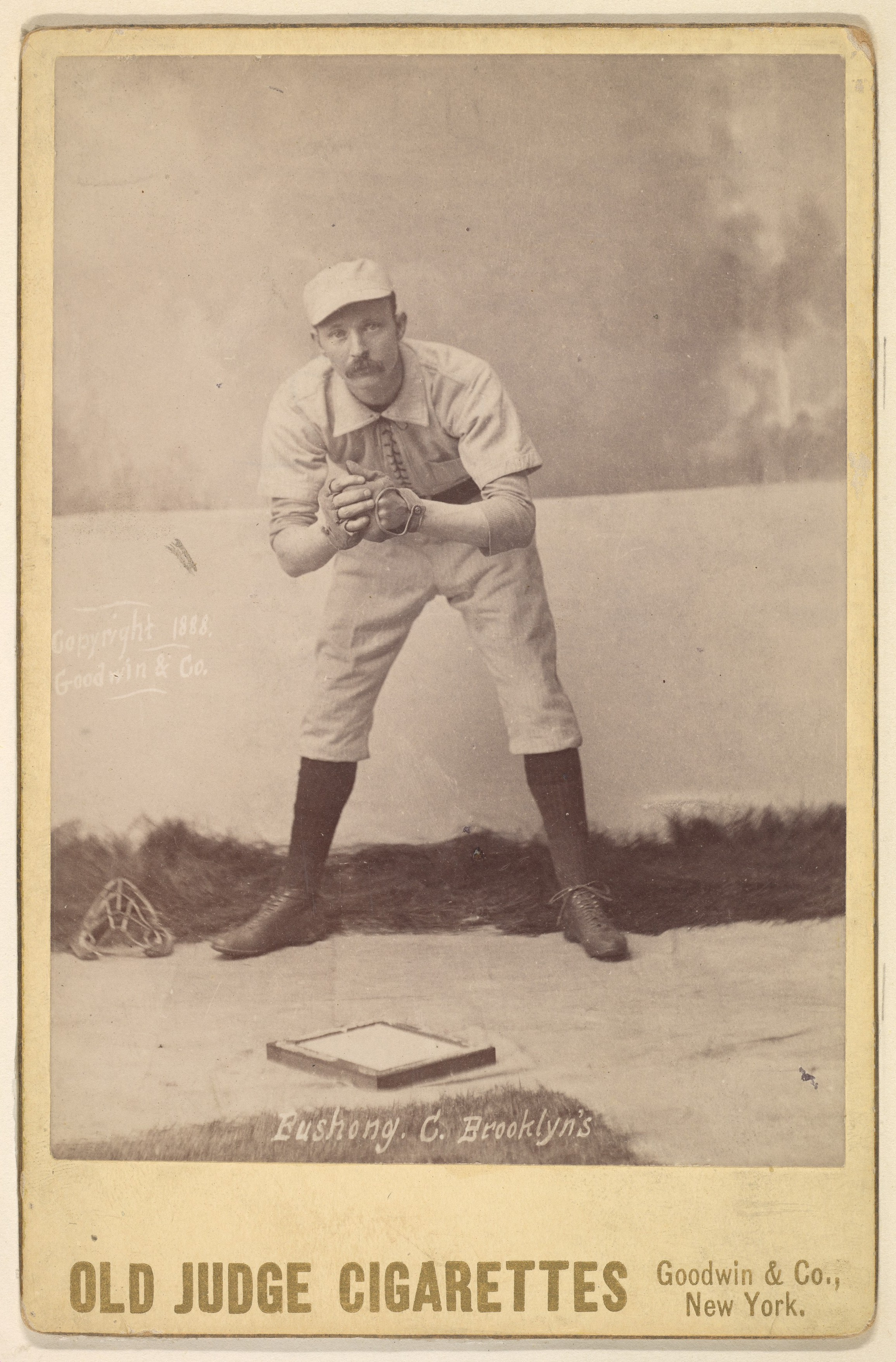
Doc Bushong in the 1888 Old Judge baseball card, showing glove.

In a game that was traditionally played bare-handed, it is difficult to say who was first to make and use the padded catcher's mitt similar to today's glove. The first player to wear a glove was catcher Doug Allison, in 1870. In 1888, Joe Gunson described his catcher's mitt, and is sometimes associated with its invention, along with Doc Bushong and others. But his claim as first is brought into question by a Brooklyn Eagle article that describes Bushong with his special glove at least a season before Gunson's claim. But on July 1, 1887, while at bat in the sixth inning of a game against Louisville, Bushong's fingers were mashed by a wild pitch from Louisville switch pitcher Ice Box Chamberlain The injury resulted in a broken finger and prevented him from playing for almost ten and a half weeks. But it is easy to believe that on September 18, 1887, when he returned, Bushong had seriously padded a mitt to protect his hand as well his dentistry profession. Further, an article on October 13, 1887, by the Brooklyn Eagle, tells of Bushong losing his old glove....

"he feels pretty badly over the matter.. it was padded and fixed up until it was as soft to his hand as a pillow and it was his best friend while he was up under the bat. It will take him some time to become accustomed to a new glove and it will be several seasons before he can get as many patches on the one he wears now as he had on the old one."

The photographs taken of Bushong, used for the 1888 season, on the Old Judge baseball cards, show him with thick gloves on both hands, but in 1889 Sporting Life magazine described his mitt as a spring mattress on his left hand.. In the end, most agree that Bushong certainly deserves credit in the evolution of the catcher's mitt and with his known motivation to protect his hands, many believe that he was its primary inventor.

=== Scandal in the 1889 World Series ===
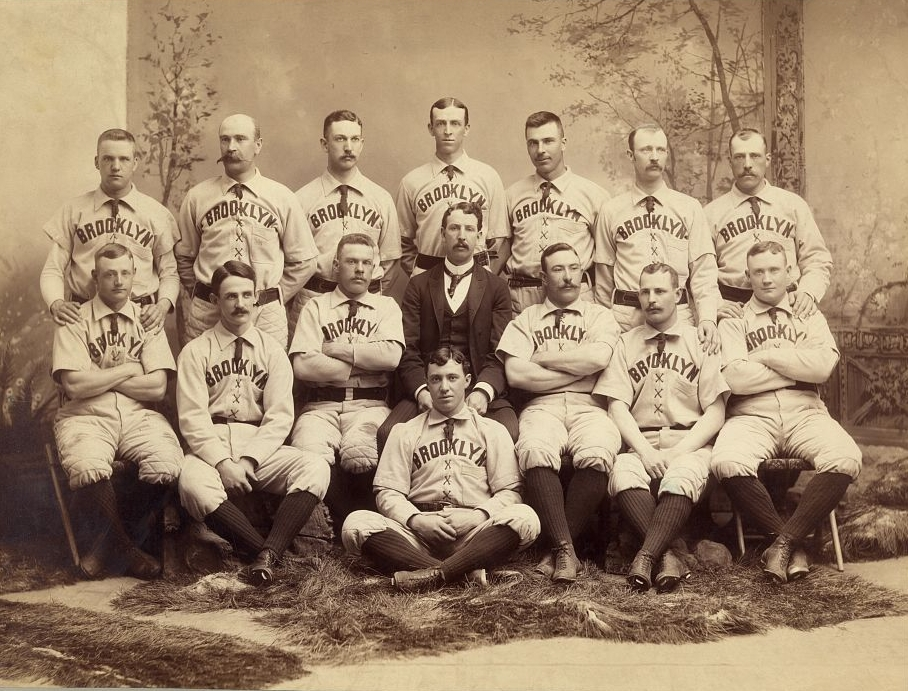
Albert Doc Bushong back row, 2nd from right, with 1889 Brooklyn Bridegrooms.

A minor scandal involving Bushong and the 1889 World Series came to light in November 1889. Following the Bridegrooms' series loss to the New York Giants, six games to three, a telegram from Bushong to Giants catcher Jocko Milligan was revealed.

"To John Milligan, Catcher St. Louis Base Ball Club: Brooklyn, Oct. 19. (1889) Friend Jack: Hope you will answer the telegram I sent you, which was that I'll give $200 for your share in our agreement. It will be a personal favor to me if you will, and besides will be a sure thing for you and yet give me a chance to make a little. Don't lose your chance as you did with Tucker. Reply instantly at my expense. A. J. Bushong"

The scheme involved a $400 prize to the individual winners of the series. The prize had been offered by a chewing gum firm, likely the Green and Blackwell Company of New York, known as G and B Chewing Gum Co., who in 1888, were first to issue gum with their baseball cards. Bushong's idea was prize sharing, where, before the actual games, they were to agree, whoever was the winner would split the prize with the loser. In the newspapers, it was briefly mentioned as cheating, even though the practice was common in numerous sports and had been around in baseball for over a decade. Though embarrassed over the affair, nothing more came of it and Bushong continued playing.

== Later life ==
Doc Bushong's 1908 obituary from the New York Times

Following his baseball retirement in 1891, Bushong, then 33 years old, began practicing dentistry full-time along with two brothers at a large dental house in Hoboken, New Jersey. Eventually he became manager of the establishment. Also while working in Hoboken, he began and, according to baseball historian William Rankin, "built up a large and flourishing practice", at his home in south Brooklyn, 442 Ninth Street. On November 9, 1898, Bushong's 4-year-old son died after being severely burned in an election night bonfire, which were a common ritual at the time. Eventually three of his sons, as well as a nephew, also became Brooklyn dentists and several worked at the Bushong family business, which was in operation as late as 1942. On August 19, 1908, Bushong died of cancer at his home, 442 Ninth Street, Brooklyn, at the age of 51 and was buried in the Holy Cross Cemetery, Brooklyn, New York.
