= Jim McCormick (pitcher) =

American baseball player (1856–1918)

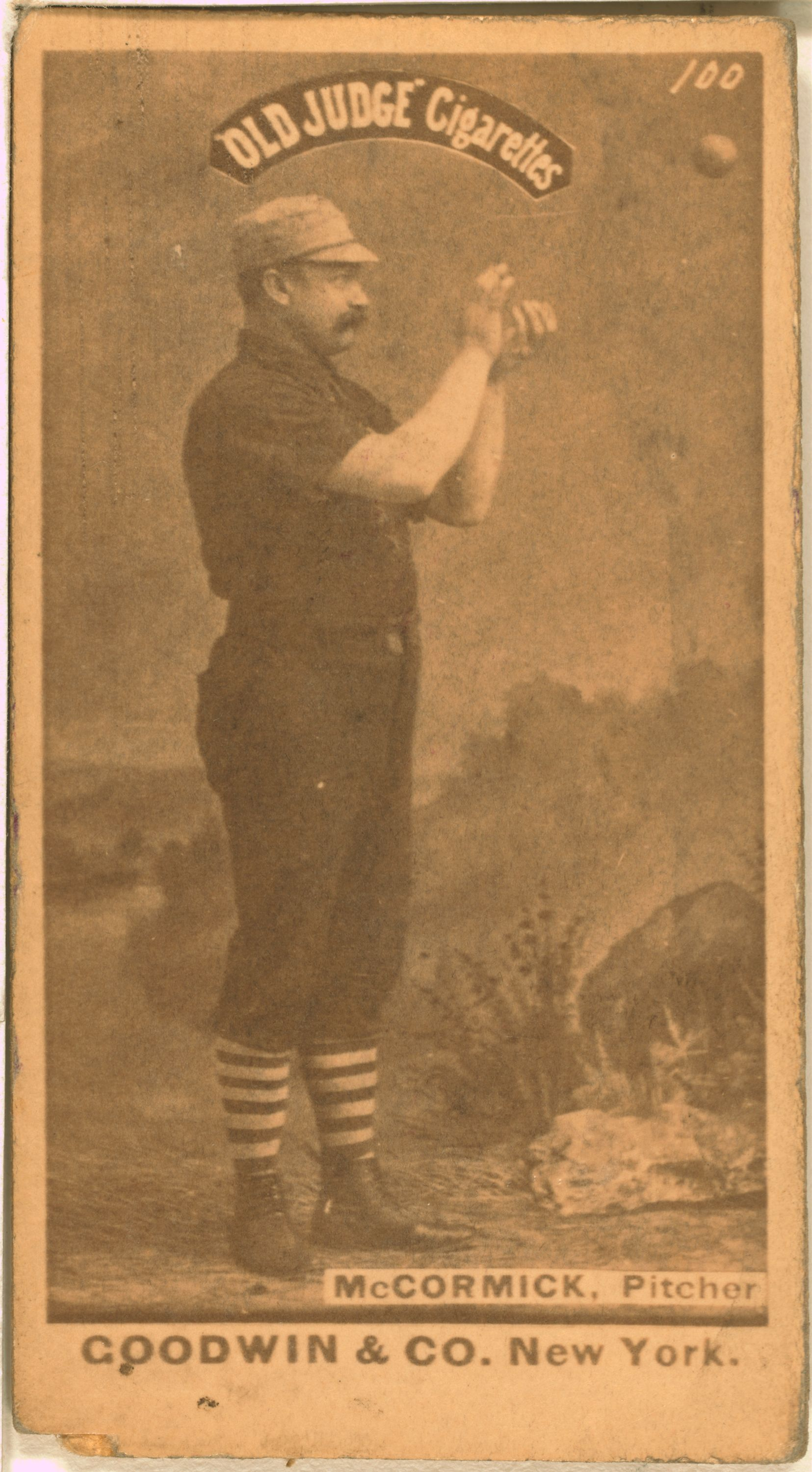
- McCormick in 1887
- Pitcher
- Born: 3 November 1856; Glasgow, Scotland
- Died: 10 March 1918 (aged 61); Paterson, New Jersey, U.S.
- Batted: Right Threw: Right

MLB debut
- May 20, 1878, for the Indianapolis Blues

Last MLB appearance
- October 7, 1887, for the Pittsburgh Alleghenys

MLB statistics
- Win–loss record: 265–214
- Earned run average: 2.43
- Strikeouts: 1,704
- Stats at Baseball Reference

Teams
- As Player: Indianapolis Blues (1878); Cleveland Blues (1879–1884); Cincinnati Outlaw Reds (1884); Providence Grays (1885); Chicago White Stockings (1885–1886); Pittsburgh Alleghenys (1887); As Manager: Cleveland Blues (1879–1880, 1882)

Career highlights and awards
- 2× NL wins leader (1880, 1882); NL ERA leader (1883); UA ERA leader (1884)

James McCormick (3 November 1856 – 10 March 1918) was an American professional baseball pitcher. A native of Glasgow (he was actually born outside the Glasgow boundary, in Thornliebank, Renfrewshire), he was the first ballplayer born in Scotland to appear in a major league game.

McCormick was great friends with Mike "King" Kelly and was also very well liked by Cap Anson, two of the great personalities of early baseball. Anson was McCormick's captain-manager in 1885 and 1886, when Chicago won its last 19th-century pennants.

== Career ==
McCormick's major league career began with the National League's Indianapolis Blues in 1878, where he sported a 1.69 earned run average in 14 games. The next year, he moved on to the NL's Cleveland Blues, where he spent more than five seasons. He led the NL in losses with 40 in 1879, but led the league in wins with 45 the following year. He led the NL in wins again in 1882, with 36, and led the league in ERA in 1883, matching his 1.84 ERA with a 28–12 record. He also served as a player/manager for the Cleveland Blues in 1879-1880 and 1882 with a 74–96 record.

In 1884, McCormick pitched 42 games for the Spiders, but then jumped mid-season to the Cincinnati Outlaw Reds of the Union Association. He received a $1,000 bonus for switching leagues mid-season, but the UA only lasted one year.

McCormick started the 1885 season back in the NL, this time with the Providence Grays, but he only pitched in four games before the Grays sold him to the Chicago White Stockings. Chicago won the NL pennant in both of McCormick's seasons with the team, in 1885 and 1886.

After the 1886 championship, club president Albert G. Spalding sold several of his best-known players, mainly for drinking during the season. After selling George Gore to New York and King Kelly to Boston, he sent McCormick to Pittsburgh just before the 1887 season. Before the sale, Spalding said "the only trouble between McCormick and the club has been a difference of opinion between him and me as to his habits. Anson is and always has been very partial to 'Mac,' and wants him this season." Ten days later in Louisville, Anson said, "I desire his services very much, however, for I think that, under the new [pitching] rules [allowing for unrestricted overhand throwing], he will be the best pitcher on the diamond. If he is released, it will only be for a good sum of money." About a week after that, Spalding sold McCormick.

McCormick went 13-23 with a 4.30 ERA in Pittsburgh in 1887.

== Death ==
He died in Paterson, New Jersey, at the age of 61, and is interred at Laurel Grove Memorial Park in Totowa, New Jersey.

== Highlights ==
- He helped the White Stockings to win the 1885 and 1886 National League pennants.
- Led the National League in walks allowed (74) and losses (40) in 1879.
- Led the National League in wins (45), games pitched (74), innings pitched (657 2/3), games started (74), complete games (72) and batters faced (2,669) in 1880.
- Led the National League in hits allowed per 9 innings pitched (8.28) and complete games (57) in 1881.
- Led the National League in wins (36), games (68), innings (595 2/3), games started (67), complete games (65) and batters faced (2,412) in 1882.
- Led the National League in earned run average (1.84) and winning percentage (.700) in 1883.
- Led the Union Association in ERA (1.54), hits per 9 innings (6.47) and shutouts (7) in 1884.
- Ranks 34th on the MLB all-time ERA list (2.43).
- Ranks 39th on the MLB all-time wins list (265).
- Ranks 29th on the MLB all-time walks per 9 innings list (1.58).
- Ranks 34th on the MLB all-time innings list (4,275 2/3).
- Ranks 150th on the MLB all-time strikeouts list (1,704).
- Ranks 58th on the MLB all-time games started list (485).
- Ranks 11th on the MLB all-time complete games list (466).
- Ranks 87th on the MLB all-time shutouts list (33).
- Ranks 36th on the MLB all-time batters faced list (16,884).

== See also ==
- List of Major League Baseball career wins leaders
- List of Major League Baseball annual ERA leaders
- List of Major League Baseball annual wins leaders
- List of Major League Baseball player-managers
