= Cleveland Blues (National League) =

American baseball team (1879–1884)

Information
- Location: Based in Cleveland, Ohio
- Founded: 1879
- Folded: 1884
- Former league: National League
- Former ballpark: Kennard Street Park
- President: C. H. Bulkeley (1882–1884); J. Ford Evans (1879–1881)
- Manager: Charlie Hackett (1884); Frank Bancroft (1883); Fred Dunlap (1882); Jim McCormick (1882); John Clapp (1881); Mike McGeary (1881); Jim McCormick (1879–1880)

The Cleveland Blues were a Major League Baseball team based in Cleveland, Ohio, that operated in the National League from 1879 to 1884. In six seasons their best finish was third place in 1880. Hugh Daily threw a no-hitter for the Blues on September 13, 1883. Besides Daily, notable Blues players included Jack Glasscock and Baseball Hall of Fame member Ned Hanlon. The team was purchased by Charles Byrne in 1885 for $10,000 and folded into his Brooklyn Grays team.

== Baseball Hall of Famers ==
Cleveland Blues Hall of Famers
Inductee	Position	Tenure	Inducted
Ned Hanlon	CF	1880	1996

== See also ==
- 1879 Cleveland Blues season
- 1880 Cleveland Blues season
- 1881 Cleveland Blues season
- 1882 Cleveland Blues season
- 1883 Cleveland Blues season
- 1884 Cleveland Blues season
- Cleveland Blues (NL) all-time roster
