= Baltimore Orioles (1882–1899) all-time roster =

List of baseball players

- The following is a list of players and who appeared in at least one game for the **Baltimore Orioles** franchise of Major League Baseball, which played in the American Association from 1882 until 1891 and in the National League from 1892 until 1899. Players in **bold** are in the Baseball Hall of Fame.

== A ==
- John Ake
- Doug Allison
- Doc Amole

== B ==
- Jersey Bakely
- George Baker
- Kirtley Baker
- Norm Baker
- Phil Baker
- Art Ball
- Billy Barnie
- George Blackburn
- Ned Bligh
- Frank Bonner
- Amos Booth
- Frank Bowerman
- George Bradley
- Steve Brodie
- Cal Broughton
- Dan Brouthers
- Joe Brown
- Stub Brown
- Tom Brown
- William Brown
- Charlie Buffinton
- Oyster Burns
- Pat Burns
- Frank Burt

== C ==
- Bart Cantz
- Scoops Carey
- Dennis Casey
- Boileryard Clarke
- Dad Clarkson
- Monk Cline
- Jim Clinton
- George Cobb
- Dick Cogan
- Bill Conway
- Dick Conway
- Joe Corbett
- Pat Crisham
- Monte Cross
- Bert Cunningham

== D ==
- Sun Daley
- Law Daniels
- Jumbo Davis
- Gene DeMontreville
- Gene Derby
- Frank Diven
- Buttercup Dickerson
- Tom Dolan
- Jim Donnelly
- Joe Dowie
- Jack Doyle

== E ==
- Harry East
- Dave Eggler
- Harry Ely
- Bob Emslie
- Duke Esper
- Jake Evans
- Tom Evers

== F ==
- Bill Farrell
- Jack Farrell
- Joe Farrell
- Alex Ferson
- Jim Field
- Frank Foreman
- John Fox
- Chris Fulmer
- Dave Fultz

== G ==
- Bill Gallagher
- Bill Gardner
- Gid Gardner
- Bill Geiss
- Les German
- Jake Gettman
- Bill Gilbert
- Pete Gilbert
- Bob Gilks
- Kid Gleason
- John Godar
- George Goetz
- Walt Goldsby
- Fred Goldsmith
- Bill Greenwood
- Ed Greer
- Mike Griffin
- Joe Gunson

== H ==
- Jocko Halligan
- Ned Hanlon
- Lou Hardie
- John Harkins
- Charlie Harris
- Bill Hawke
- Jackie Hayes
- John Healy
- Tony Hellman
- George Hemming
- Hardie Henderson
- John Henry
- Tom Hess
- Mike Heydon
- Belden Hill
- Bill Hill
- Bill Hoffer
- Will Holland
- Ducky Holmes
- Buster Hoover
- Jack Horner
- Joe Hornung
- Sadie Houck
- Charlie Householder
- Frank Houseman
- Harry Howell
- Jay Hughes

== I ==
- Charlie Ingraham
- Bert Inks

== J ==
- Harry Jacoby
- **Hughie Jennings**
- Bill Johnson
- David Jones

== K ==
- Bob Keating
- **Willie Keeler**
- Bill Keister
- **Joe Kelley**
- John Kelly
- John Kerins
- Matt Kilroy
- Mike Kilroy
- Bill Kissinger
- Frank Kitson
- Bill Kling
- Ed Knouff

== L ==
- Candy LaChance
- Doc Landis
- Jack Leary
- Charlie Levis
- Dan Long
- Jim Long

== M ==
- Reddy Mack
- Jimmy Macullar
- Kid Madden
- George Magoon
- Jack Manning
- Tim Manning
- George Mappes
- Al Maul
- Jerry McCormick
- Sandy McDermott
- Dan McGann
- Chippy McGarr
- Jumbo McGinnis
- **Joe McGinnity**
- **John McGraw**
- Joe McGuckin
- Doc McJames
- Kit McKenna
- Jim McLaughlin
- Sadie McMahon
- Edgar McNabb
- Dusty Miller
- Ralph Miller
- Jocko Milligan
- Mike Morrison
- Bill Mountjoy
- Mike Muldoon
- Tony Mullane
- Henry Myers

== N ==
- Sandy Nava
- Jack Neagle
- Tricky Nichols
- Jerry Nops

== O ==
- Jack O'Brien
- John O'Brien
- Tom O'Brien (2B)
- Tom O'Brien (OF)
- John O'Connell
- Pat O'Connell
- Dave Oldfield
- Patrick O'Loughlin
- Mike O'Rourke

== P ==
- John Peltz
- John Pickett
- Gracie Pierce
- Arlie Pond
- Abner Powell
- Tom Power
- Phil Powers
- Blondie Purcell

== Q ==
- Joe Quinn
- Tom Quinn

== R ==
- Irv Ray
- Billy Reid
- Heinie Reitz
- Wilbert Robinson
- Bobby Rothermel
- Dave Rowe
- Joseph Roxburgh
- John Russ
- Jack Ryan

== S ==
- Lou Say
- Nick Scharf
- Crazy Schmit
- Milt Scott
- Sam Shaw
- Jimmy Sheckard
- John Shetzline
- Billy Shindle
- George Shoch
- Lev Shreve
- Bill Smiley
- Aleck Smith
- Lewis Smith
- Phenomenal Smith
- Joe Sommer
- Len Sowders
- Dan Stearns
- Jake Stenzel
- Ben Stephens
- Otis Stocksdale
- Harry Stovey
- Cub Stricker
- Sy Sutcliffe
- Rooney Sweeney

== T ==
- Pop Tate
- Billy Taylor
- Harry Taylor
- John Tener
- Adonis Terry
- George Townsend
- Bill Traffley
- George Treadway
- Sam Trott
- Tommy Tucker

== V ==
- George Van Haltren
- Tom Vickery
- Joe Visner

== W ==
- Jack Wadsworth
- Charlie Waitt
- George Walker
- Oscar Walker
- Joe Walsh
- Piggy Ward
- Curt Welch
- Perry Werden
- George Wetzel
- Lew Whistler
- Pat Whitaker
- Ed Whiting
- Henry Wilson
- Bill Wise
- Sam Wise
- George Wood

== Y ==
- Tom York

== Z ==
- William Zay
