= 1882 Baltimore Orioles season =

1882 Baltimore Orioles
- League: American Association
- Ballpark: Newington Park
- City: Baltimore, Maryland
- Record: 19–54 (.260)
- League place: 6th
- Owner: Harry Von der Horst
- Manager: Henry Myers

The 19th century's version of the Baltimore Orioles were founded in 1882 as part of the new American Association. Owned by wealthy Harry Von der Horst, the Orioles finished the season in last place with only 19 wins.

== Regular season ==
=== Season standings ===
American Association
Team	W	L	Pct.	GB	Home	Road
Cincinnati Red Stockings	55	25	.688	—	31‍–‍11	24‍–‍14
Philadelphia Athletics	41	34	.547	11½	21‍–‍18	20‍–‍16
Louisville Eclipse	42	38	.525	13	26‍–‍13	16‍–‍25
Pittsburgh Alleghenys	39	39	.500	15	17‍–‍20	22‍–‍19
St. Louis Brown Stockings	37	43	.463	18	24‍–‍20	13‍–‍23
Baltimore Orioles	19	54	.260	32½	7‍–‍25	12‍–‍29

=== Record vs. opponents ===
1882 American Association record Sources:
Team	BAL	CIN	LOU	PHA	PIT	STL
Baltimore	—	2–14	3–13	4–7	7–7–1	3–13
Cincinnati	14–2	—	11–5	10–6	10–6	10–6
Louisville	13–3	5–11	—	5–11	10–6	9–7
Philadelphia	7–4	6–10	11–5	—	6–10	11–5
Pittsburgh	7–7–1	6–10	6–10	10–6	—	10–6
St. Louis	13–3	6–10	7–9	5–11	6–10	—

=== Roster ===
1882 Baltimore Orioles
Roster
Pitchers: Bill Geiss; Doc Landis; Jack Leary; Tricky Nichols; Bill Wise; Catchers: Ed Whiting; David Jones	Infielders: Amos Booth; Harry East; Tom Evers; Charlie Householder; Harry Jacoby; Henry Myers; Gracie Pierce; John Shetzline; Bill Smiley	Outfielders: Tom Brown; Frank Burt; Monk Cline; John Russ; Nick Scharf; Lewis Smith; Charlie Waitt	Manager: Henry Myers

== Player stats ==
=== Batting ===
==== Starters by position ====
Note: Pos = Position; G = Games played; AB = At bats; H = Hits; Avg. = Batting average; HR = Home runs

Pos	Player	G	AB	H	Avg.	HR
C	Ed Whiting	74	308	80	.260	0
1B	Charlie Householder	74	307	78	.254	1
2B	Gracie Pierce	41	151	30	.199	0
3B	John Shetzline	73	282	62	.220	0
SS	Henry Myers	69	294	53	.180	0
OF	Charlie Waitt	72	250	39	.156	0
OF	Tom Brown	45	181	55	.304	1
OF	Monk Cline	44	172	38	.221	0

==== Other batters ====
Note: G = Games played; AB = At bats; H = Hits; Avg. = Batting average; HR = Home runs

Player	G	AB	H	Avg.	HR
Harry Jacoby	31	121	21	.174	1
Bill Smiley	16	61	9	.148	0
Nick Scharf	10	39	8	.205	1
Frank Burt	10	36	4	.111	0
David Jones	4	15	1	.067	0
Harry East	1	4	0	.000	0
Tom Evers	1	4	0	.000	0
Amos Booth	1	3	0	.000	0
John Russ	1	3	1	.333	0
Lewis Smith	1	3	0	.000	0

=== Pitching ===
==== Starting pitchers ====
Note: G = Games pitched; IP = Innings pitched; W = Wins; L = Losses; ERA = Earned run average; SO = Strikeouts

Player	G	IP	W	L	ERA	SO
Doc Landis	42	342.0	11	27	3.33	62
Tricky Nichols	16	118.1	1	12	5.02	21
Bill Geiss	13	95.2	4	9	4.80	10
Jack Leary	3	26.0	2	1	1.38	2
Bill Wise	3	26.0	1	2	2.77	9
John Russ	1	5.0	0	1	7.20	0

==== Other pitchers ====
Note: G = Games pitched; IP = Innings pitched; W = Wins; L = Losses; ERA = Earned run average; SO = Strikeouts

Player	G	IP	W	L	ERA	SO
Henry Myers	6	26.0	0	2	6.58	7

==== Relief pitchers ====
Note: G = Games pitched; W = Wins; L = Losses; SV = Saves; ERA = Earned run average; SO = Strikeouts

Player	G	W	L	SV	ERA	SO
Tom Brown	2	0	0	0	1.08	2
