= List of Major League Baseball players (E) =

The following is a list of Major League Baseball players, retired or active. As of the end of the 2011 season, there have been 330 players with a last name that begins with E who have been on a major league roster at some point.

== E ==
Name	Debut	Final Game	Position	Teams	Ref
Don Eaddy	April 24, 1959	September 25, 1959	Pinch runner/Third baseman	Chicago Cubs	
Bill Eagan	April 8, 1891	June 2, 1898	Second baseman	St. Louis Browns (1891), Chicago Colts (1893), Pittsburgh Pirates (1898)	
Truck Eagan	May 1, 1901	May 30, 1901	Infielder	Pittsburgh Pirates (1901), Cleveland Blues (1901)	
Bill Eagle	August 20, 1898	August 22, 1898	Outfielder	Washington Senators	
Charlie Eakle	August 20, 1915	August 21, 1915	Second baseman	Baltimore Terrapins	
Howard Earl	April 19, 1890	September 27, 1891	Outfielder	Chicago Colts (1890), Milwaukee Brewers (1891)	
Scott Earl	September 10, 1984	September 30, 1984	Second baseman	Detroit Tigers	
Billy Earle	April 27, 1889	September 6, 1894	Catcher	Cincinnati Red Stockings (1889), St. Louis Browns (1890), Pittsburgh Pirates (1892–1893), Louisville Colonels (1894), Brooklyn Grooms (1894)	
Arnold Earley	September 27, 1960	July 25, 1967	Pitcher	Boston Red Sox (1960–1965), Chicago Cubs (1966), Houston Astros (1967)	
Bill Earley	September 22, 1986	October 4, 1986	Pitcher	St. Louis Cardinals	
Tom Earley	September 27, 1938	June 27, 1945	Pitcher	Boston Bees/Braves (1938–1942, 1945)	
Jake Early	May 4, 1939	September 30, 1949	Catcher	Washington Senators (1939–1943, 1946), St. Louis Browns (1947), Washington Senators (1948–1949)	
George Earnshaw	June 3, 1928	September 26, 1936	Pitcher	Philadelphia Athletics (1928–1933), Chicago White Sox (1934), Brooklyn Dodgers (1935–1936), St. Louis Cardinals (1936)	
Mike Easler	September 5, 1973	October 5, 1987	Left fielder/Designated hitter	Houston Astros (1973–1975), California Angels (1976), Pittsburgh Pirates (1977, 1979–1983), Boston Red Sox (1984–1985), New York Yankees (1986), Philadelphia Phillies (1987), New York Yankees (1987),	
Damion Easley	August 13, 1992	September 28, 2008	Second baseman	California Angels (1992–1996), Detroit Tigers (1996–2002), Tampa Bay Devil Rays (2003), Florida Marlins (2004–2005), Arizona Diamondbacks (2006), New York Mets (2007–2008)	
Logan Easley	April 9, 1987	May 28, 1989	Pitcher	Pittsburgh Pirates	
Mal Eason	October 1, 1900	October 4, 1906	Pitcher	Chicago Orphans (1900–1902), Boston Beaneaters (1902), Detroit Tigers (1903), Brooklyn Superbas (1905–1906)	
Carl East	August 24, 1915	May 3, 1924	Outfielder/Pitcher	St. Louis Browns (1915), Washington Senators (1924)	
Harry East	June 17, 1882	June 17, 1882	Third baseman	Baltimore Orioles	
Hugh East	September 13, 1941	October 3, 1943	Pitcher	New York Giants	
Luke Easter	August 11, 1949	May 4, 1954	First baseman	Cleveland Indians	
Henry Easterday	June 23, 1884	September 21, 1890	Shortstop	Philadelphia Keystones (1884), Kansas City Cowboys (1888), Columbus Solons (1889–1890), Philadelphia Athletics (1890), Louisville Colonels (1890)	
Paul Easterling	April 11, 1928	May 11, 1938	Outfielder	Detroit Tigers (1928, 1930), Philadelphia Athletics (1938)	
Jamie Easterly	April 6, 1974	October 2, 1987	Pitcher	Atlanta Braves (1974–1979), Milwaukee Brewers (1981–1983), Cleveland Indians (1983–1987)	
Ted Easterly	April 17, 1909	October 3, 1915	Catcher	Cleveland Naps (1909–1912), Chicago White Sox (1912–1913), Kansas City Packers (1914–1915)	
Roy Easterwood	April 21, 1944	June 25, 1944	Catcher	Chicago Cubs	
Jack Easton	September 2, 1889	July 7, 1894	Pitcher/Outfielder	Columbus Solons (1889–1891), St. Louis Browns (1891–1892), Pittsburgh Pirates (1894)	
John Easton	June 19, 1955	April 26, 1959	Pinch hitter/Pinch runner	Philadelphia Phillies (1955, 1959)	
Rawly Eastwick	Septembert 12, 1974	October 1, 1981	Pitcher	Cincinnati Reds (1974–1977), St. Louis Cardinals (1977), New York Yankees (1978), Philadelphia Phillies (1978–1979), Kansas City Royals (1980), Chicago Cubs (1981)	
Adam Eaton	May 30, 2000	August 24, 2009	Pitcher	San Diego Padres (2000–2005), Texas Rangers (2006), Philadelphia Phillies (2007–2008), Baltimore Orioles (2009), Colorado Rockies (2009)	
Adam Eaton	September 4, 2012	August 14, 2021	Outfielder	Arizona Diamondbacks (2012–2013), Chicago White Sox (2014–2016), Washington Nationals (2017–2020), Chicago White Sox (2021), Los Angeles Angels (2021)	
Craig Eaton	September 5, 1979	September 28, 1979	Pitcher	Kansas City Royals	
Zeb Eaton	April 18, 1944	September 25, 1945	Pitcher	Detroit Tigers	
Gary Eave	April 12, 1988	May 15, 1990	Pitcher	Atlanta Braves (1988–1989), Seattle Mariners (1990)	
Vallie Eaves	September 12, 1935	April 26, 1942	Pitcher	Philadelphia Athletics (1935), Chicago White Sox (1939–1940), Chicago Cubs (1941–1942)	
Eddie Eayrs	June 30, 1913	October 1, 1921	Outfielder/Pitcher	Pittsburgh Pirates (1913), Boston Braves (1920–1921), Brooklyn Robins (1921)	
Derrin Ebert	April 6, 1999	October 2, 1999	Pitcher	Atlanta Braves	
Hi Ebright	April 24, 1889	June 11, 1889	Utility player	Washington Nationals	
Harry Eccles	September 13, 1915	September 27, 1915	Pitcher	Philadelphia Athletics	
Angel Echevarria	July 15, 1996	September 29, 2002	Outfielder	Colorado Rockies (1996–2000), Milwaukee Brewers (2000–2001), Chicago Cubs (2002)	
Johnny Echols	May 24, 1939	May 29, 1939	Pinch runner	St. Louis Cardinals	
Eric Eckenstahler	September 9, 2002	September 21, 2003	Pitcher	Detroit Tigers	
Dennis Eckersley	April 12, 1975	September 26, 1998	Pitcher	Cleveland Indians (1975–1977), Boston Red Sox (1978–1984), Chicago Cubs (1984–1986), Oakland Athletics (1987–1995), St. Louis Cardinals (1996–1997), Boston Red Sox (1998)	
Al Eckert	April 21, 1930	July 25, 1935	Pitcher	Cincinnati Reds (1930–1931), St. Louis Cardinals (1935)	
Charlie Eckert	September 18, 1919	August 28, 1922	Pitcher	Philadelphia Athletics (1919–1920, 1922)	
Ox Eckhardt	April 16, 1932	May 15, 1936	Right fielder	Boston Braves (1932), Brooklyn Dodgers (1936)	
David Eckstein	April 3, 2001	October 3, 2010	Shortstop	Anaheim Angels (2001–2004), St. Louis Cardinals (2005–2007), Toronto Blue Jays (2008), Arizona Diamondbacks (2008), San Diego Padres (2009–2010)	
Chris Eddy	April 26, 1995	May 12, 1995	Pitcher	Oakland Athletics	
Don Eddy	April 7, 1970	September 30, 1971	Pitcher	Chicago White Sox	
Steve Eddy	June 13, 1979	August 5, 1979	Pitcher	California Angels	
Ed Edelen	August 20, 1932	August 21, 1932	Pitcher	Washington Senators	
Joe Edelen	April 18, 1981	May 15, 1982	Pitcher	St. Louis Cardinals (1981), Cincinnati Reds (1981–1982)	
John Edelman	June 2, 1955	September 21, 1955	Pitcher	Milwaukee Braves (1955)	
Charlie Eden	August 17, 1877	October 1, 1885	Outfielder	Chicago White Stockings (1877), Cleveland Blues (1879), Pittsburgh Alleghenys (1884–1885)	
Mike Eden	August 2, 1976	September 11, 1978	Second baseman/Shortstop	Atlanta Braves (1976), Chicago White Sox (1978)	
Ken Edenfield	May 11, 1995	April 6, 1996	Relief pitcher	California Angels	
Tom Edens	June 2, 1987	May 10, 1995	Pitcher	New York Mets (1987), Milwaukee Brewers (1990), Minnesota Twins (1991–1992), Houston Astros (1993–1994), Philadelphia Phillies (1994), Chicago Cubs (1995)	
Butch Edge	August 13, 1979	September 28, 1979	Pitcher	Toronto Blue Jays	
Bill Edgerton	September 3, 1966	April 25, 1969	Pitcher	Kansas City Athletics (1966–1967), Seattle Pilots	
Stump Edington	June 20, 1912	July 13, 1912	Relief pitcher	Pittsburgh Pirates (1912)	
Steve Edlefsen	August 21, 2011	June 8, 2012	Outfielder	San Francisco Giants (2011–2012)	
Dave Edler	September 4, 1980	June 9, 1983	Third baseman	Seattle Mariners	
Jim Edmonds	September 9, 1993	September 21, 2010	Center fielder	California/Anaheim Angels (1993–1999), St. Louis Cardinals (2000–2007), San Diego Padres (2008), Chicago Cubs (2008), Milwaukee Brewers (2010), Cincinnati Reds (2010)	
Brian Edmondson	April 2, 1998	September 29, 1999	Relief pitcher	Atlanta Braves (1998), Florida Marlins (1998–1999)	
George Edmondson	August 15, 1922	June 6, 1924	Pitcher	Cleveland Indians	
Paul Edmondson	June 20, 1969	September 25, 1969	Pitcher	Chicago White Sox (1969)	
Eddie Edmonson	October 4, 1913	October 5, 1913	First baseman/Outfielder	Cleveland Naps	
Sam Edmonston	June 24, 1907	June 24, 1907	Pitcher	Washington Senators	
Bob Edmundson	September 15, 1906	October 8, 1908	Outfielder	Washington Senators (1906, 1908)	
Edwards, first name unknown	1875	1875	Center fielder/Pitcher	Brooklyn Atlantics	
Bruce Edwards	June 23, 1946	September 13, 1956	Catcher	Brooklyn Dodgers (1946–1951), Chicago Cubs (1951–1952, 1954), Washington Senators (1955), Cincinnati Reds (1956)	
Dave Edwards	September 11, 1978	October 2, 1982	Outfielder	Minnesota Twins (1978–1980), San Diego Padres (1981–1982)	
Doc Edwards	April 21, 1962	August 29, 1970	Catcher	Cleveland Indians (1962–1963), Kansas City Athletics (1963–1965), New York Yankees (1965), Philadelphia Phillies (1970)	
Foster Edwards	July 2, 1925	May 21, 1930	Pitcher	Boston Braves (1925–1928), New York Yankees (1930)	
Hank Edwards	September 10, 1941	September 26, 1953	Outfielder	Cleveland Indians (1941–1943, 1946–1949), Chicago Cubs (1949–1950), Brooklyn Dodgers (1951), Cincinnati Reds (1951–1952), Chicago White Sox (1952), St. Louis Browns (1953)	
Jim Joe Edwards	May 14, 1922	July 19, 1928	Pitcher	Cleveland Indians (1922–1925), Chicago White Sox (1925–1926), Cincinnati Reds (1928)	
Johnny Edwards	June 27, 1961	October 2, 1974	Catcher	Cincinnati Reds (1961–1967), St. Louis Cardinals (1968), Houston Astros (1969–1974)	
Marshall Edwards	April 11, 1981	September 11, 1983	Outfielder	Milwaukee Brewers	
Mike Edwards (2B)	September 10, 1977	September 28, 1980	Second baseman	Pittsburgh Pirates (1977), Oakland Athletics (1978–1980)	
Mike Edwards (3B)	September 20, 2003	July 1, 2006	Third baseman/Left fielder	Oakland Athletics (2003), Los Angeles Dodgers (2005), Pittsburgh Pirates (2006)	
Edwards	September 17, 1915	September 17, 1915	Second baseman	Philadelphia Athletics	
Sherman Edwards	September 21, 1934	September 21, 1934	Pitcher	Cincinnati Reds	
Wayne Edwards	September 11, 1989	May 25, 1991	Pitcher	Chicago White Sox	
Harry Eells	April 22, 1906	August 14, 1906	Pitcher	Cleveland Naps	
Robert Eenhoorn	April 27, 1994	September 28, 1997	Second baseman	New York Yankees (1994–1996), California/Anaheim Angels (1996–1997)	
Ben Egan	September 29, 1908	September 23, 1915	Catcher	Philadelphia Athletics (1908, 1912), Cleveland Naps/Indians (1914–1915)	
Dick Egan (IF)	September 15, 1908	October 5, 1916	Second baseman	Cincinnati Reds (1908–1912), Brooklyn Robins (1914–1915), Boston Braves (1915–1916)	
Dick Egan (P)	April 9, 1963	September 4, 1967	Pitcher	Detroit Tigers (1963–1964), California Angels (1966), Los Angeles Dodgers (1967)	
Jim Egan	May 15, 1882	September 29, 1882	Pitcher/Center fielder	Troy Trojans	
Rip Egan	April 30, 1894	April 30, 1894	Pitcher/Umpire	Washington Senators	
Tom Egan	May 27, 1975	June 15, 1975	Catcher	Los Angeles/California Angels (1965–1970), Chicago White Sox (1971–1972), California Angels (1974–1975)	
Wish Egan	September 3, 1902	July 3, 1906	Pitcher	Detroit Tigers (1902), St. Louis Cardinals (1905–1906)	
Jack Egbert	April 21, 2009	May 28, 2012	Pitcher	Chicago White Sox (2009), New York Mets (2012)	
Elmer Eggert	April 7, 1927	October 1, 1927	Pinch hitter/Second baseman	Boston Red Sox	
Dave Eggler	May 18, 1902	June 9, 1885	Center fielder	New York Mutuals (1871–1873), Philadelphia White Stockings (1874), Athletic of Philadelphia (1874–1876), Chicago White Stockings (1877), Buffalo Bisons (1879), Baltimore Orioles (1883), Buffalo Bisons (1883–1885)	
Bruce Egloff	April 13, 1991	May 13, 1991	Pitcher	Cleveland Indians	
Frederick Ehlen	April 14, 1873	April 14, 1873	Right fielder	Baltimore Marylands	
Howard Ehmke	April 12, 1915	May 22, 1930	Pitcher	Buffalo Blues (1915), Detroit Tigers (1916–1922), Boston Red Sox (1923–1926), Philadelphia Athletics (1926–1930)	
Red Ehret	July 7, 1888	June 25, 1898	Pitcher	Kansas City Cowboys (1888), Louisville Colonels (1889–1891), Pittsburgh Pirates (1892–1894), St. Louis Browns (1895), Cincinnati Reds (1896–1897), Louisville Colonels (1898)	
Rube Ehrhardt	July 18, 1924	October 5, 1929	Pitcher	Brooklyn Robins (1924–1928), Cincinnati Reds (1929)	
Hack Eibel	June 13, 1912	July 17, 1920	Outfielder/Pitcher	Cleveland Naps (1912), Boston Red Sox (1920)	
Juan Eichelberger	September 7, 1978	June 20, 1988	Pitcher	San Diego Padres (1978–1982), Cleveland Indians (1983), Atlanta Braves (1988)	
Mark Eichhorn	August 30, 1982	September 14, 1996	Pitcher	Toronto Blue Jays (1982, 1986–1988), Atlanta Braves (1989), California Angels (1990–1992), Toronto Blue Jays (1992–1993), Baltimore Orioles (1994), California Angels (1996)	
Ike Eichrodt	September 7, 1925	June 22, 1931	Outfielder	Cleveland Indians (1925–1927), Chicago White Sox (1931)	
Dave Eiland	August 3, 1988	September 10, 2000	Pitcher	New York Yankees (1988–1991), San Diego Padres (1992–1993), New York Yankees (1995), Tampa Bay Devil Rays (1998–2000)	
Dave Eilers	July 27, 1964	September 26, 1967	Pitcher	Milwaukee Braves (1964–1965), New York Mets (1965–1966), Houston Astros (1967)	
Darrell Einertson	April 15, 2000	July 27, 2000	Pitcher	New York Yankees	
Joey Eischen	June 19, 1994	May 29, 2006	Catcher	Montreal Expos (1994), Los Angeles Dodgers (1995–1996), Detroit Tigers (1996), Cincinnati Reds (1997), Montreal Expos/Washington Nationals (2001–2006)	
Jake Eisenhart	June 10, 1944	June 10, 1944	Pitcher	Cincinnati Reds	
Jim Eisenreich	April 6, 1982	September 26, 1998	Outfielder	Minnesota Twins (1982–1984), Kansas City Royals (1987–1992), Philadelphia Phillies (1993–1996), Florida Marlins (1997–1998), Los Angeles Dodgers (1998)	
Harry Eisenstat	May 19, 1935	September 25, 1942	Pitcher	Brooklyn Dodgers (1935–1937), Detroit Tigers (1938–1939), Cleveland Indians (1939–1942)	
Ed Eiteljorge	May 2, 1890	August 27, 1891	Pitcher	Chicago Colts (1890), Washington Statesmen (1891)	
Mike Ekstrom	September 10, 2008	August 12, 2012	Pitcher	San Diego Padres (2008–2009), Tampa Bay Rays (2010–2011), Colorado Rockies (2012)	
Scott Elarton	June 20, 1998	June 28, 2008	Pitcher	Houston Astros (1998–2001), Colorado Rockies (2001, 2003–2004), Cleveland Indians (2004–2005), Kansas City Royals (2006–2007), Cleveland Indians (2008)	
Kid Elberfeld	May 30, 1898	September 24, 1914	Shortstop	Philadelphia Phillies (1898), Cincinnati Reds (1899), Detroit Tigers (1901–1903), New York Highlanders (1903–1909), Washington Senators (1910–1911), Brooklyn Robins (1914)	
Scott Elbert	August 29, 2008	September 27, 1914	Relief pitcher	Los Angeles Dodgers (2008–2012, 2014)	
Dave Elder	July 24, 2002	May 11, 2003	Pitcher	Cleveland Indians	
George Elder	July 22, 1949	September 25, 1949	Outfielder	St. Louis Browns	
Heinie Elder	July 7, 1913	July 7, 1913	Pitcher	Detroit Tigers	
Brad Eldred	July 22, 2005		First baseman	Pittsburgh Pirates (2005, 2007), Colorado Rockies (2010), Detroit Tigers (2012)	
Cal Eldred	September 24, 1991	October 1, 2005	Pitcher	Milwaukee Brewers (1991–1999), Chicago White Sox (2000–2001), St. Louis Cardinals (2003–2005)	
Lee Elia	April 23, 1966	September 13, 1968	Shortstop	Chicago White Sox (1966), Chicago Cubs (1968)	
Pete Elko	September 17, 1943	October 1, 1944	Third baseman	Chicago Cubs	
Roy Ellam	September 18, 1909	August 29, 1918	Shortstop	Cincinnati Reds (1909), Pittsburgh Pirates (1918)	
Hod Eller	April 16, 1917	September 15, 1921	Pitcher	Cincinnati Reds	
Frank Ellerbe	August 28, 1919	September 27, 1924	Third baseman	Washington Senators (1919–1921), St. Louis Browns (1921–1924)	
Joe Ellick	May 13, 1875	October 11, 1884	Outfielder	St. Louis Red Stockings (1875), Milwaukee Grays (1878), Worcester Ruby Legs (1880), Chicago Browns/Pittsburgh Stooges (1884), Kansas City Cowboys (1884), Baltimore Monumentals (1884)	
Bruce Ellingsen	July 4, 1974	September 25, 1974	Pitcher	Cleveland Indians	
Larry Elliot	April 19, 1962	October 2, 1966	Outfielder	Pittsburgh Pirates (1962–1963), New York Mets (1964, 1966)	
Allen Elliott	June 14, 1923	September 29, 1924	First baseman	Chicago Cubs	
Bob Elliott	September 2, 1939	September 16, 1953	Third baseman/Outfielder	Pittsburgh Pirates (1939–1946), Boston Braves (1947–1951), New York Giants (1952), St. Louis Browns (1953), Chicago White Sox (1953)	
Carter Elliott	September 10, 1921	September 28, 1921	Shortstop	Chicago Cubs	
Claude Elliott	April 16, 1904	October 7, 1905	Pitcher	Cincinnati Reds (1904), New York Giants (1904–1905)	
Donnie Elliott	April 23, 1994	September 23, 1995	Pitcher	San Diego Padres	
Gene Elliott	April 14, 1911	May 14, 1911	Outfielder	New York Highlanders	
Glenn Elliott	April 17, 1947	September 29, 1949	Pitcher	Boston Braves	
Hal Elliott	April 19, 1929	August 9, 1932	Pitcher	Philadelphia Phillies	
Harry Elliott	August 1, 1953	September 25, 1955	Outfielder	St. Louis Cardinals (1953, 1955)	
Jumbo Elliott	April 21, 1923	June 9, 1934	Pitcher	St. Louis Browns (1923), Brooklyn Robins (1925, 1927–1930), Philadelphia Phillies (1931–1934), Boston Braves (1934)	
Randy Elliott	September 10, 1972	June 28, 1980	Outfielder	San Diego Padres (1972, 1974), San Francisco Giants (1977), Oakland Athletics (1980)	
Rowdy Elliott	September 24, 1910	October 1, 1910	Catcher	Boston Doves (1910), Chicago Cubs (1916–1918), Brooklyn Robins (1920)	
A. J. Ellis	September 15, 2008	September 30, 2018	Catcher	Los Angeles Dodgers (2008–2016), Philadelphia Phillies (2016), Miami Marlins (2017), San Diego Padres (2018)	
Ben Ellis	July 16, 1896	August 22, 1896	Third baseman	Philadelphia Phillies	
Dock Ellis	June 18, 1968	September 29, 1979	Pitcher	Pittsburgh Pirates (1968–1975), New York Yankees (1976–1977), Oakland Athletics (1976–1977), Texas Rangers (1977–1979), New York Mets (1979), Pittsburgh Pirates (1979)	
Jim Ellis	August 11, 1967	July 12, 1969	Pitcher	Chicago Cubs (1967), St. Louis Cardinals (1969)	
John Ellis	May 17, 1969	October 3, 1981	First baseman/Catcher	New York Yankees (1969–1972), Cleveland Indians (1973–1975), Texas Rangers (1976–1981)	
Mark Ellis	April 9, 2002	September 27, 2014	Second baseman	Oakland Athletics (2002–2003, 2005–2011), Colorado Rockies (2011), Los Angeles Dodgers (2012–2013), St. Louis Cardinals (2014)	
Rob Ellis	June 18, 1971	May 14, 1975	Outfielder	Milwaukee Brewers (1971, 1974–1975)	
Robert Ellis	September 12, 1996	August 16, 2003	Pitcher	California Angels (1996), Arizona Diamondbacks (2001), Los Angeles Dodgers (2002), Texas Rangers (2003)	
Rube Ellis	April 15, 1909	October 6, 1912	Outfielder	St. Louis Cardinals	
Sammy Ellis	April 14, 1962	June 8, 1969	Pitcher	Cincinnati Reds (1962–1967), California Angels (1968), Chicago White Sox (1969)	
Babe Ellison	September 18, 1916	September 23, 1920	First baseman	Detroit Tigers	
George Ellison	August 21, 1920	August 21, 1920	Pitcher	Cleveland Indians	
Jason Ellison	May 9, 2003	August 24, 2008	Outfielder	San Francisco Giants (2003–2006), Seattle Mariners (2007), Cincinnati Reds (2007), Texas Rangers (2008)	
Jacoby Ellsbury	June 30, 2007	September 30, 2017	Center fielder	Boston Red Sox (2007–2013), New York Yankees (2014–2017)	
Dick Ellsworth	June 22, 1958	June 23, 1971	Pitcher	Chicago Cubs (1958–1966), Philadelphia Phillies (1967), Boston Red Sox (1968–1969), Cleveland Indians (1969–1970), Milwaukee Brewers (1970–1971)	
Steve Ellsworth	April 7, 1988	July 8, 1988	Pitcher	Boston Red Sox	
Verdo Elmore	September 11, 1924	September 24, 1924	Outfielder	St. Louis Browns	
Roy Elsh	April 19, 1923	October 4, 1925	Outfielder	Chicago White Sox (1923–1925)	
Kevin Elster	September 2, 1986	October 1, 2000	Shortstop	New York Mets (1986–1992), New York Yankees (1994–1995), Philadelphia Phillies (1995), Texas Rangers (1996), Pittsburgh Pirates (1997), Texas Rangers (1998), Los Angeles Dodgers (2000)	
Don Elston	September 17, 1953	October 1, 1964	Pitcher	Chicago Cubs (1953), Brooklyn Dodgers (1957), Chicago Cubs (1957–1964)	
Narciso Elvira	September 9, 1990	September 28, 1990	Pitcher	Milwaukee Brewers	
Bones Ely	June 19, 1884	September 24, 1902	Shortstop	Buffalo Bisons (1884), Louisville Colonels (1886), Syracuse Stars (1890), Brooklyn Grooms (1891), St. Louis Browns (1893–1895), Pittsburgh Pirates (1896–1901), Philadelphia Athletics (1901), Washington Senators (1902)	
Harry Ely	September 24, 1892	September 24, 1892	Pitcher	Baltimore Orioles	
John Ely	April 28, 2010	September 16, 2012	Pitcher	Los Angeles Dodgers	
Brad Emaus	April 1, 2011	April 17, 2011	Second baseman	New York Mets	
Alan Embree	September 15, 1992	July 15, 2009	Pitcher	Cleveland Indians (1992, 1995–1996), Atlanta Braves (1997–1998), Arizona Diamondbacks (1998), San Francisco Giants (1999–2001), Chicago White Sox (2001), San Diego Padres (2002), Boston Red Sox (2002–2005), New York Yankees (2005), San Diego Padres (2006), Oakland Athletics (2007–2008), Colorado Rockies (2009)	
Red Embree	September 10, 1941	October 2, 1949	Pitcher	Cleveland Indians (1941–1942, 1944–1947), New York Yankees (1948), St. Louis Browns (1949)	
Slim Embrey	October 1, 1923	October 1, 1923	Pitcher	Chicago White Sox	
Chester Emerson	September 27, 1911	April 16, 1912	Outfielder	Philadelphia Athletics	
Cal Emery	July 15, 1963	September 20, 1963	First baseman	Philadelphia Phillies	
Spoke Emery	July 18, 1924	July 26, 1924	Outfielder	Philadelphia Phillies	
Charlie Emig	September 4, 1896	September 4, 1896	Pitcher	Louisville Colonels	
Frank Emmer	April 25, 1916	July 28, 1926	Shortstop	Cincinnati Reds (1916, 1926)	
Bob Emmerich	September 22, 1923	October 6, 1923	Center fielder	Boston Braves	
Slim Emmerich	May 14, 1945	April 26, 1946	Pitcher	New York Giants	
Bob Emslie	July 25, 1883	July 16, 1885	Pitcher/Umpire	Baltimore Orioles (1883–1885), Philadelphia Athletics (1885)	
Angelo Encarnación	May 2, 1995	September 27, 1997	Catcher	Pittsburgh Pirates (1995–1996), Anaheim Angels (1997)	
Edwin Encarnación	June 24, 2005	September 27, 2020	Outfielder	Cincinnati Reds (2005–2009), Toronto Blue Jays (2009–2016), Cleveland Indians (2017–2018), Seattle Mariners (2019), New York Yankees (2019), Chicago White Sox (2020)	
Juan Encarnación	September 2, 1997	August 30, 2007	Outfielder	Detroit Tigers (1997–2001), Cincinnati Reds (2002), Florida Marlins (2002–2003), Los Angeles Dodgers (2004), Florida Marlins (2004–2005), St. Louis Cardinals (2006–2007)	
Luis Encarnación	July 27, 1990	August 11, 1990	Pitcher	Kansas City Royals	
Mario Encarnación	August 26, 2001	April 14, 2002	Outfielder	Colorado Rockies (2001), Chicago Cubs (2002)	
Trevor Enders	September 2, 2000	September 29, 2000	Pitcher	Tampa Bay Devil Rays	
Bill Endicott	April 21, 1946	September 18, 1946	Left fielder	St. Louis Cardinals	
Joe Engel	May 30, 1912	August 6, 1920	Pitcher	Washington Senators (1912–1915), Cincinnati Reds (1917), Cleveland Indians (1919), Washington Senators (1920)	
Steve Engel	July 30, 1985	October 3, 1985	Pitcher	Chicago Cubs	
Charlie Engle	September 14, 1925	September 27, 1930	Infielder	Philadelphia Athletics (1925–1926), Pittsburgh Pirates (1930)	
Clyde Engle	April 12, 1909	June 9, 1916	Utility player	New York Highlanders (1909–1910), Boston Red Sox (1910–1914), Buffalo Buffeds/Blues (1914–1915), Cleveland Indians (1916)	
Dave Engle	April 14, 1981	July 28, 1989	Catcher/Right fielder/Designated hitter	Minnesota Twins (1981–1985), Detroit Tigers (1986), Montreal Expos (1987–1989), Milwaukee Brewers (1989)	
Rick Engle	September 2, 1981	September 2, 1981	Pitcher	Montreal Expos	
Charlie English	July 23, 1932	October 3, 1937	Third baseman	Chicago White Sox (1932–1933), New York Giants (1936), Cincinnati Reds (1937)	
Gil English	September 20, 1931	June 11, 1944	Third baseman	New York Giants (1931–1932), Detroit Tigers (1936–1937), Boston Bees (1937–1938), Brooklyn Dodgers (1944)	
Jesse English	April 5, 2010	April 20, 2010	Pitcher	Washington Nationals	
Woody English	April 26, 1927	July 1, 1938	Shortstop	Chicago Cubs (1927–1936), Brooklyn Dodgers (1937–1938)	
Del Ennis	April 28, 1946	June 14, 1959	Outfielder	Philadelphia Phillies (1946–1956), St. Louis Cardinals (1957–1958), Cincinnati Reds (1959), Chicago White Sox (1959)	
John Ennis	April 10, 2002	September 10, 2007	Pitcher	Atlanta Braves (2002), Detroit Tigers (2004), Philadelphia Phillies (2007)	
Russ Ennis	September 19, 1926	September 19, 1926	Catcher	Washington Senators	
Barry Enright	June 30, 2010	May 15, 2013	Pitcher	Arizona Diamondbacks (2010–2011), Los Angeles Angels of Anaheim (2012–2013)	
George Enright	August 8, 1976	September 7, 1976	Catcher	Chicago White Sox	
Jack Enright	September 26, 1917	September 26, 1917	Pitcher	New York Yankees	
Jewel Ens	April 29, 1922	June 15, 1925	Infielder	Pittsburgh Pirates	
Mutz Ens	September 2, 1912	September 7, 1912	First baseman	Chicago White Sox	
Morgan Ensberg	September 20, 2000	May 25, 2008	Third baseman	Houston Astros (2000–2007), San Diego Padres (2007), New York Yankees (2008)	
Charlie Enwright	April 19, 1909	April 22, 1909	Shortstop	St. Louis Cardinals	
Terry Enyart	June 17, 1974	July 5, 1974	Pitcher	Montreal Expos	
Jack Enzenroth	May 1, 1914	September 22, 1915	Catcher	St. Louis Browns (1914), Kansas City Packers (1914–1915)	
Johnny Enzmann	July 10, 1914	October 2, 1920	Pitcher	Brooklyn Robins (1914), Cleveland Indians (1918–1919), Philadelphia Phillies (1920)	
Nathan Eovaldi	August 6, 2011		Pitcher	Los Angeles Dodgers (2011–2012), Miami Marlins (2012–2014), New York Yankees (2015–2016), Tampa Bay Rays (2018), Boston Red Sox (2018–2022), Texas Rangers (2023-present)	
Jim Eppard	September 8, 1987	October 1, 1990	Outfielder	California Angels (1987–1989), Toronto Blue Jays (1990)	
Al Epperly	April 25, 1938	July 7, 1950	Pitcher	Chicago Cubs (1938), Brooklyn Dodgers (1950)	
Cody Eppley	April 23, 2011	April 3, 2013	Pitcher	Texas Rangers (2011), New York Rangers (2012–2013)	
Aubrey Epps	September 29, 1935	September 29, 1935	Catcher	Pittsburgh Pirates	
Hal Epps	September 9, 1938	September 20, 1944	Outfielder	St. Louis Cardinals, St. Louis Browns, Philadelphia Athletics	
Mike Epstein	September 16, 1966	April 28, 1974	First baseman	Baltimore Orioles (1966–1967), Washington Senators (1967–1971), Oakland Athletics (1971–1972), Texas Rangers (1973), California Angels (1973–1974)	
Greg Erardi	September 6, 1977	September 24, 1977	Pitcher	Seattle Mariners	
Eddie Erautt	April 16, 1947	September 22, 1953	Pitcher	Cincinnati Reds/Redlegs (1947–1951, 1953), St. Louis Cardinals (1953)	
Joe Erautt	May 9, 1950	July 22, 1951	Catcher	Chicago White Sox	
Todd Erdos	June 8, 1997	October 5, 2001	Pitcher	San Diego Padres (1997, 2000), New York Yankees (1998–2000), Boston Red Sox (2001)	
John Ericks	June 24, 1995	April 28, 1997	Pitcher	Pittsburgh Pirates	
Don Erickson	September 1, 1958	September 19, 1958	Pitcher	Philadelphia Phillies	
Eric Erickson	October 6, 1914	September 29, 1922	Pitcher	New York Giants (1914), Detroit Tigers (1916, 1918–1919), Washington Senators (1919–1922)	
Hal Erickson	April 14, 1953	July 10, 1953	Pitcher	Detroit Tigers	
Hank Erickson	April 17, 1935	September 2, 1935	Catcher	Cincinnati Reds	
Matt Erickson	July 9, 2004	July 18, 2004	Infielder	Milwaukee Brewers	
Paul Erickson	April 17, 1941	July 10, 1948	Pitcher	Chicago Cubs (1941–1942), Philadelphia Phillies (1948), New York Giants (1948)	
Ralph Erickson	September 11, 1929	May 31, 1930	Relief pitcher	Pittsburgh Pirates	
Roger Erickson	April 6, 1978	September 26, 1983	Pitcher	Minnesota Twins (1978–1982), New York Yankees (1982–1983)	
Scott Erickson	June 25, 1990	June 8, 2006	Pitcher	Minnesota Twins (1990–1995), Baltimore Orioles (1995–2000, 2002), New York Mets (2004), Texas Rangers (2004), Los Angeles Dodgers (2005), New York Yankees (2006)	
Cal Ermer	September 26, 1947	September 26, 1947	Second baseman	Washington Senators	
Frank Ernaga	May 24, 1957	September 21, 1958	Outfielder	Chicago Cubs	
Dick Errickson	April 27, 1938	September 13, 1942	Pitcher	Boston Bees/Braves (1938–1942), Chicago Cubs (1942)	
Carl Erskine	July 25, 1948	June 14, 1959	Pitcher	Brooklyn/Los Angeles Dodgers (1948–1959)	
Darin Erstad	June 14, 1996	October 4, 2009	Outfielder/First baseman	California/Anaheim/Los Angeles Angels of Anaheim (1996–2006), Chicago White Sox (2007), Houston Astros (2008–2009)	
Tex Erwin	August 26, 1907	July 23, 1914	Catcher	Detroit Tigers (1907), Brooklyn Superbas/Dodgers/Robins (1910–1914), Cincinnati Reds (1914)	
Nick Esasky	June 19, 1983	April 21, 1990	First/Third baseman	Cincinnati Reds (1983–1988), Boston Red Sox (1989), Atlanta Braves (1990)	
Nino Escalera	April 17, 1954	September 25, 1954	Outfielder/First baseman	Cincinnati Redlegs	
Edgmer Escalona	September 10, 2010	August 18, 2013	Relief pitcher	Colorado Rockies	
Félix Escalona	April 4, 2002	October 2, 2005	Shortstop/Second baseman	Tampa Bay Devil Rays (2002–2003), New York Yankees (2004–2005)	
Sergio Escalona	May 17, 2009	September 7, 2011	Pitcher	Philadelphia Phillies (2009), Houston Astros (2011)	
Chico Escárrega	April 26, 1982	September 27, 1982	Relief pitcher	Chicago White Sox	
Jim Eschen	July 20, 1915	July 29, 1915	Outfielder	Cleveland Indians	
Larry Eschen	June 16, 1942	July 17, 1942	Shortstop	Philadelphia Athletics	
Alcides Escobar	September 3, 2008		Shortstop/Second baseman	Milwaukee Brewers (2008–2010), Kansas City Royals (2011–2018), Washington Nationals (2021–2022)	
Alex Escobar	May 8, 2001	August 25, 2006	Outfielder	New York Mets (2001), Cleveland Indians (2003–2004), Washington Nationals (2006)	
Ángel Escobar	May 17, 1988	May 26, 1988	Shortstop	San Francisco Giants	
Eduardo Escobar	September 2, 2011		Infielder	Chicago White Sox (2011–2012), Minnesota Twins (2012–2018), Arizona Diamondbacks (2018–2021), Milwaukee Brewers (2021), New York Mets (2022–2023), Los Angeles Angels (2023)	
José Escobar	April 13, 1991	May 11, 1991	Infielder	Cleveland Indians	
Kelvim Escobar	June 29, 1997	June 6, 2009	Pitcher	Toronto Blue Jays (1997–2003), Anaheim Angels/Los Angeles Angels of Anaheim (2004–2007, 2009)	
Yunel Escobar	June 2, 2007	August 6, 2017	Shortstop/Third baseman	Atlanta Braves (2007–2010), Toronto Blue Jays (2010–2012), Tampa Bay Rays (2013–2014), Washington Nationals (2015), Los Angeles Angels (2016–2017)	
Vaughn Eshelman	May 2, 1995	July 11, 1997	Pitcher	Boston Red Sox	
Jimmy Esmond	April 20, 1911	October 3, 1915	Shortstop	Cincinnati Reds (1911–1912), Indianapolis Hoosiers (1914), Newark Pepper (1915)	
Duke Esper	April 18, 1890	July 12, 1898	Pitcher	Philadelphia Athletics (1890), Pittsburgh Alleghenys (1890), Philadelphia Phillies (1890–1892), Pittsburgh Pirates (1892), Washington Senators (1893–1894), Baltimore Orioles (1894–1896), St. Louis Browns (1897–1898)	
Geno Espineli	July 20, 2008	September 24, 2008	Pitcher	San Francisco Giants	
Juan Espino	June 25, 1982	October 5, 1986	Catcher	New York Yankees (1982–1983, 1985–1986)	
Danny Espinosa	September 1, 2010	September 15, 2017	Second baseman/Shortstop	Washington Nationals (2010–2016), Los Angeles Angels (2017), Seattle Mariners (2017), Tampa Bay Rays (2017)	
Nino Espinosa	September 13, 1974	September 23, 1981	Pitcher	New York Mets (1974–1978), Philadelphia Phillies (1979–1981), Toronto Blue Jays (1981)	
Álvaro Espinoza	September 14, 1984	July 12, 1997	Shortstop	Minnesota Twins (1984–1986), New York Yankees (1988–1991), Cleveland Indians (1993–1996), New York Mets (1996), Seattle Mariners (1997)	
Brian Esposito	June 2, 2007	September 30, 2010	Catcher	St. Louis Cardinals (2007), Houston Astros (2010)	
Mike Esposito	September 21, 2005	October 1, 2005	Pitcher	Colorado Rockies (2005)	
Sammy Esposito	September 28, 1952	August 23, 1963	Third baseman/Shortstop	Chicago White Sox (1952, 1955–1963), Kansas City Athletics (1963)	
Cecil Espy	September 2, 1983	June 13, 1993	Outfielder	Los Angeles Dodgers (1983), Texas Rangers (1987–1990), Pittsburgh Pirates (1991–1992), Cincinnati Reds (1993)	
Chuck Essegian	April 15, 1983	September 28, 1963	Left fielder	Philadelphia Phillies (1958), St. Louis Cardinals (1959), Los Angeles Dodgers (1959–1960), Baltimore Orioles (1961), Kansas City Athletics (1961, 1963), Cleveland Indians (1961–1962)	
Mark Esser	April 22, 1979	April 29, 1979	Pitcher	Chicago White Sox	
Jim Essian	September 15, 1973	September 30, 1984	Catcher	Philadelphia Phillies (1973–1975), Chicago White Sox (1976–1977), Oakland Athletics (1978–1980), Chicago White Sox (1981), Seattle Mariners (1982), Cleveland Indians (1983), Oakland Athletics (1984)	
Bill Essick	September 12, 1906	May 28, 1907	Pitcher	Cincinnati Reds	
Bobby Estalella (C)	September 17, 1996	June 6, 2004	Catcher	Philadelphia Phillies (1996–1999), San Francisco Giants (2000–2001), New York Yankees (2001), Colorado Rockies (2002–2003), Arizona Diamondbacks (2004), Toronto Blue Jays (2004)	
Bobby Estalella (OF)	September 7, 1935	September 16, 1949	Outfielder	Washington Senators (1935–1936, 1939), St. Louis Browns (1941), Washington Senators (1942), Philadelphia Athletics (1943–1945, 1949)	
Dick Estelle	September 6, 1964	October 3, 1965	Pitcher	San Francisco Giants	
Dude Esterbrook	May 1, 1880	July 22, 1891	Third baseman	Buffalo Bisons (1880), Cleveland Blues (1882), New York Metropolitans (1883–1884), New York Giants (1885–1886), Indianapolis Hoosiers (1888), Louisville Colonels (1888–1889), New York Giants (1890), Brooklyn Grooms (1891)	
Shawn Estes	September 16, 1995	September 24, 2008	Pitcher	San Francisco Giants (1995–2001), New York Mets (2002), Cincinnati Reds (2002), Chicago Cubs (2003), Colorado Rockies (2004), Arizona Diamondbacks (2005), San Diego Padres (2006, 2008)	
George Estock	April 21, 1951	September 26, 1951	Pitcher	Boston Braves	
Chuck Estrada	April 21, 1960	June 11, 1967	Pitcher	Baltimore Orioles (1960–1964), Chicago Cubs (1966), New York Mets (1967)	
Francisco Estrada	September 14, 1971	September 14, 1971	Catcher	New York Mets	
Horacio Estrada	May 4, 1999	July 21, 2001	Pitcher	Milwaukee Brewers (1999–2000), Colorado Rockies (2001)	
Johnny Estrada	May 15, 2001	July 24, 2008	Catcher	Philadelphia Phillies (2001–2002), Atlanta Braves (2003–2005), Arizona Diamondbacks (2006), Milwaukee Brewers (2007), Washington Nationals (2008)	
Marco Estrada	August 20, 2008	April 16, 2019	Pitcher	Washington Nationals (2008–2009), Milwaukee Brewers (2010–2014), Toronto Blue Jays (2015–2018), Oakland Athletics (2019)	
Oscar Estrada	1924	April 21, 1929	Pitcher	Cuban Stars East (1924), St. Louis Browns (1929)	
Leo Estrella	July 18, 2000	April 7, 2004	Pitcher	Toronto Blue Jays (2000), Milwaukee Brewers (2003), San Francisco Giants (2004)	
Andy Etchebarren	September 26, 1962	April 20, 1978	Catcher	Baltimore Orioles (1962, 1965–1975), California Angels (1975–1977), Milwaukee Brewers (1978)	
Buck Etchison	September 22, 1943	October 1, 1944	First baseman	Boston Braves	
Bobby Etheridge	July 16, 1967	October 2, 1969	Third baseman	San Francisco Giants	
Seth Etherton	May 26, 2000	June 3, 2006	Pitcher	Anaheim Angels (2000), Cincinnati Reds (2003), Oakland Athletics (2005), Kansas City Royals (2006)	
Andre Ethier	May 2, 2006	October 1, 2017	Outfielder	Los Angeles Dodgers	
Nick Etten	September 8, 1938	May 9, 1947	First baseman	Philadelphia Phillies (1938–1939), Philadelphia Phillies (1941–1942), New York Yankees (1943–1946), Philadelphia Phillies (1947)	
Mark Ettles	June 5, 1993	July 9, 1993	Pitcher	San Diego Padres	
John Eubank	September 19, 1905	August 2, 1907	Pitcher	Detroit Tigers	
Uel Eubanks	July 20, 1922	August 25, 1922	Pitcher	Chicago Cubs	
Frank Eufemia	May 21, 1985	October 1, 1985	Relief pitcher	Minnesota Twins	
Ferd Eunick	August 29, 1917	August 29, 1917	Third baseman	Cleveland Indians	
Tony Eusebio	August 8, 1991	October 7, 2001	Catcher	Houston Astros (1991, 1994–2001)	
Frank Eustace	April 16, 1896	June 21, 1896	Shortstop	Louisville Colonels	
Evans, first name unknown	1875	1875	Left fielder	New Haven Elm Citys	
Al Evans	September 13, 1939	August 5, 1951	Catcher	Washington Senators (1939–1942, 1944–1950), Boston Red Sox (1951)	
Art Evans	June 20, 1932	July 13, 1932	Pitcher	Chicago White Sox	
Barry Evans	September 4, 1978	October 3, 1982	Third baseman	San Diego Padres (1978–1981), New York Yankees (1981)	
Bart Evans	June 16, 1998	August 27, 1998	Pitcher	Kansas City Royals	
Bill Evans (1910s P)	August 13, 1916	June 1, 1919	Pitcher	Pittsburgh Pirates (1916–1917, 1919)	
Bill Evans (1940s P)	April 21, 1949	June 21, 1951	Pitcher	Chicago White Sox (1949), Boston Red Sox (1951)	
Chick Evans	September 19, 1909	August 27, 1910	Pitcher	Boston Doves	
Darrell Evans	April 20, 1969	October 1, 1989	Third/First baseman	Atlanta Braves (1969–1976), San Francisco Giants (1976–1983), Detroit Tigers (1984–1988), Atlanta Braves (1989)	
Dwight Evans	September 16, 1972	October 6, 1991	Right fielder	Boston Red Sox (1972–1990), Baltimore Orioles (1991)	
Jake Evans	May 1, 1879	May 19, 1885	Right fielder	Troy Trojans (1879–1881), Worcester Ruby Legs (1882), Cleveland Blues (1883–1884), Baltimore Orioles (1885)	
Joe Evans	July 3, 1915	October 1, 1925	Outfielder/Third baseman	Cleveland Indians (1915–1922), Washington Senators (1923), St. Louis Browns (1924–1925)	
Nick Evans	May 24, 2008	July 27, 2014	First baseman/Left fielder	New York Mets (2008–2011), Arizona Diamondbacks (2014)	
Red Evans	April 24, 1936	August 27, 1939	Pitcher	Chicago White Sox (1936), Brooklyn Dodgers (1939)	
Roy Evans	May 15, 1897,	August 1, 1903	Pitcher	St. Louis Browns (1897), Louisville Colonels (1897), Washington Senators (1898–1899), New York Giants (1902), Brooklyn Superbas (1902–1903), St. Louis Browns (1903)	
Steve Evans	April 16, 1908	October 3, 1915	Outfielder	New York Giants (1908), St. Louis Cardinals (1909–1913), Brooklyn Tip-Tops (1914–1915), Baltimore Terrapins (1915)	
Terry Evans	June 17, 2007	April 9, 2010	Outfielder	Los Angeles Angels of Anaheim	
Tom Evans	September 2, 1997	May 10, 2000	Third baseman	Toronto Blue Jays (1997–1998), Texas Rangers (2000)	
Dana Eveland	July 16, 2005	September 27, 2016	Pitcher	Milwaukee Brewers (2005–2006), Arizona Diamondbacks (2007), Oakland Athletics (2008–2009), Toronto Blue Jays (2010), Pittsburgh Pirates (2010), Los Angeles Dodgers (2011), Baltimore Orioles (2012), New York Mets (2014), Atlanta Braves (2015), Tampa Bay Rays (2016)	
Adam Everett	August 30, 2001	June 26, 2011	Shortstop	Houston Astros (2001–2007), Minnesota Twins (2008), Detroit Tigers (2009–2010), Cleveland Indians (2011)	
Carl Everett	July 1, 1993	July 25, 2006	Outfielder/Designated hitter	Florida Marlins (1993–1994), New York Mets (1995–1997), Houston Astros (1998–1999), Boston Red Sox (2000–2001), Texas Rangers (2002–2003), Chicago White Sox (2003), Montreal Expos (2004), Chicago White Sox (2004–2005), Seattle Mariners (2006)	
Tommy Everidge	July 28, 2009	August 26, 2009	First baseman	Oakland Athletics	
Bill Everitt	April 18, 1895	June 24, 1901	First/Third baseman	Chicago Colts (1895–1900), Washington Senators (1901)	
Leon Everitt	April 21, 1969	May 13, 1969	Pitcher	San Diego Padres	
Hoot Evers	September 16, 1941	September 30, 1956	Outfielder	Detroit Tigers (1941, 1946–1952), Boston Red Sox (1952–1954), New York Giants (1954), Detroit Tigers (1954), Baltimore Orioles (1955), Cleveland Indians (1955–1956), Baltimore Orioles (1956)	
Joe Evers	April 24, 1913	April 24, 1913	Pinch runner	New York Giants	
Johnny Evers	September 1, 1902	October 6, 1929	Second baseman	Chicago Orphans/Cubs (1902–1913), Boston Braves (1914–1917), Philadelphia Phillies (1917), Chicago White Sox (1922), Boston Braves (1929)	
Tom Evers	May 25, 1882	October 16, 1884	Second baseman	Baltimore Orioles (1882), Washington Nationals (1884)	
Bryan Eversgerd	April 30, 1994	September 26, 1998	Pitcher	St. Louis Cardinals (1994), Montreal Expos (1995), Texas Rangers (1997), St. Louis Cardinals (1998)	
George Ewell	June 26, 1871	June 26, 1871	Right fielder	Cleveland Forest Citys	
Bob Ewing	April 19, 1902	May 13, 1902	Pitcher/Outfielder	Cincinnati Reds (1902–1909), Philadelphia Phillies (1910–1911), St. Louis Cardinals (1912)	
Buck Ewing	September 9, 1880	May 27, 1897	Catcher/Infielder/Outfielder	Troy Trojans (1880–1882), New York Gothams/Giants (1883–1889), New York Giants (1890), New York Giants (1891–1892), Cleveland Spiders (1893–1894), Cincinnati Reds (1895–1897)	
John Ewing	June 18, 1883	October 1, 1891	Pitcher	St. Louis Browns (1883), Cincinnati Outlaw Reds (1884), Washington Nationals (1884), Louisville Colonels (1888–1889), New York Giants (PL) (1890), New York Giants (1891)	
Reuben Ewing	June 21, 1921	June 27, 1921	Outfielder	St. Louis Cardinals	
Sam Ewing	September 11, 1973	October 1, 1978	Outfielder/Designated hitter	Chicago White Sox (1973, 1976), Toronto Blue Jays (1977–1978)	
Art Ewoldt	September 17, 1919	September 27, 1919	Third baseman	Philadelphia Athletics	
Scott Eyre	August 1, 1997	October 4, 2009	Pitcher	Chicago White Sox (1997–2000), Toronto Blue Jays (2001–2002)	
Willie Eyre	April 6, 2006	September 28, 2011	Relief pitcher	Minnesota Twins (2006), Texas Rangers (2007, 2009), Baltimore Orioles (2011)	
George Eyrich	June 13, 1943	August 29, 1943	Pitcher	Philadelphia Phillies	
Homer Ezzell	April 22, 1923	October 3, 1925	Third baseman	St. Louis Browns (1923), Boston Red Sox (1924–1925)	
