= 1887 Baltimore Orioles season =

American baseball team season

1887 Baltimore Orioles
- League: American Association
- Ballpark: Oriole Park
- City: Baltimore, Maryland
- Record: 77–58 (.570)
- League place: 3rd
- Owner: Harry Von der Horst
- Manager: Billy Barnie

== Regular season ==
=== Season standings ===
American Association
Team	W	L	Pct.	GB	Home	Road
St. Louis Browns	95	40	.704	—	58‍–‍15	37‍–‍25
Cincinnati Red Stockings	81	54	.600	14	46‍–‍27	35‍–‍27
Baltimore Orioles	77	58	.570	18	42‍–‍21	35‍–‍37
Louisville Colonels	76	60	.559	19½	45‍–‍23	31‍–‍37
Philadelphia Athletics	64	69	.481	30	41‍–‍28	23‍–‍41
Brooklyn Grays	60	74	.448	34½	36‍–‍37	24‍–‍37
New York Metropolitans	44	89	.331	50	26‍–‍33	18‍–‍56
Cleveland Blues	39	92	.298	54	22‍–‍36	17‍–‍56

=== Record vs. opponents ===
1887 American Association record Sources:
Team	BAL	BRO	CIN	CLE	LOU	NYM	PHA	STL
Baltimore	—	10–9–1	11–9	17–3	7–11–1	15–4–2	14–6	3–16–2
Brooklyn	9–10–1	—	7–13	13–6–1	8–12	9–9	10–8–2	4–16
Cincinnati	9–11	13–7	—	11–6	8–12	17–3–1	11–9	12–6
Cleveland	3–17	6–13–1	6–11	—	8–11–1	11–8	4–14	1–18
Louisville	11–7–1	12–8	12–8	11–8–1	—	12–8	11–8–1	7–13
New York	4–15–2	9–9	3–17–1	8–11	8–12	—	7–11–1	5–14–1
Philadelphia	6–14	8–10–2	9–11	14–4	8–11–1	11–7–1	—	8–12
St. Louis	16–3–2	16–4	6–12	18–1	13–7	14–5–1	12–8	—

=== Roster ===
1887 Baltimore Orioles
Roster
Pitchers: Bill Gardner; Bob Keating; Matt Kilroy; Ed Knouff; Lev Shreve; Phenomenal Smith	Catchers: Law Daniels; Chris Fulmer; Sam Trott; Infielders: Oyster Burns; Jumbo Davis; Bill Greenwood; Tommy Tucker	Outfielders: Mike Griffin; Jackie Hayes; Blondie Purcell; Joe Sommer	Manager: Billy Barnie

== Player stats ==
=== Batting ===
==== Starters by position ====
Note: Pos = Position; G = Games played; AB = At bats; H = Hits; Avg. = Batting average; HR = Home runs; RBI = Runs batted in

Pos	Player	G	AB	H	Avg.	HR	RBI
C	Sam Trott	85	300	77	.257	0	37
1B	Tommy Tucker	136	524	144	.275	6	84
2B	Bill Greenwood	118	495	130	.263	0	65
SS	Oyster Burns	140	551	188	.341	9	99
3B	Jumbo Davis	130	485	150	.309	8	109
OF	Mike Griffin	136	532	160	.301	3	94
OF	Blondie Purcell	140	567	142	.250	4	96
OF	Joe Sommer	131	463	123	.266	0	65

==== Other batters ====
Note: G = Games played; AB = At bats; H = Hits; Avg. = Batting average; HR = Home runs; RBI = Runs batted in

Player	G	AB	H	Avg.	HR	RBI
Chris Fulmer	56	201	54	.269	0	32
Law Daniels	48	165	41	.248	0	32
Jackie Hayes	8	28	4	.143	0	3
Bill Gardner	4	11	3	.273	0	1

=== Pitching ===
==== Starting pitchers ====
Note: G = Games pitched; IP = Innings pitched; W = Wins; L = Losses; ERA = Earned run average; SO = Strikeouts

Player	G	IP	W	L	ERA	SO
Matt Kilroy	69	589.1	46	19	3.07	217
Phenomenal Smith	58	491.1	25	30	3.79	206
Ed Knouff	9	63.0	2	6	7.57	27
Lev Shreve	5	38.0	3	1	3.79	13
Bob Keating	1	9.0	0	1	11.00	0

==== Other pitchers ====
Note: G = Games pitched; IP = Innings pitched; W = Wins; L = Losses; ERA = Earned run average; SO = Strikeouts

Player	G	IP	W	L	ERA	SO
Bill Gardner	3	13.0	0	1	11.08	3

==== Relief pitchers ====
Note: G = Games pitched; W = Wins; L = Losses; SV = Saves; ERA = Earned run average; SO = Strikeouts

Player	G	W	L	SV	ERA	SO
Oyster Burns	3	1	0	0	9.53	2
Blondie Purcell	1	0	0	0	15.75	2
Joe Sommer	1	0	0	0	9.00	0
