= Dan Casey (baseball) =

American baseball player (1862–1943)

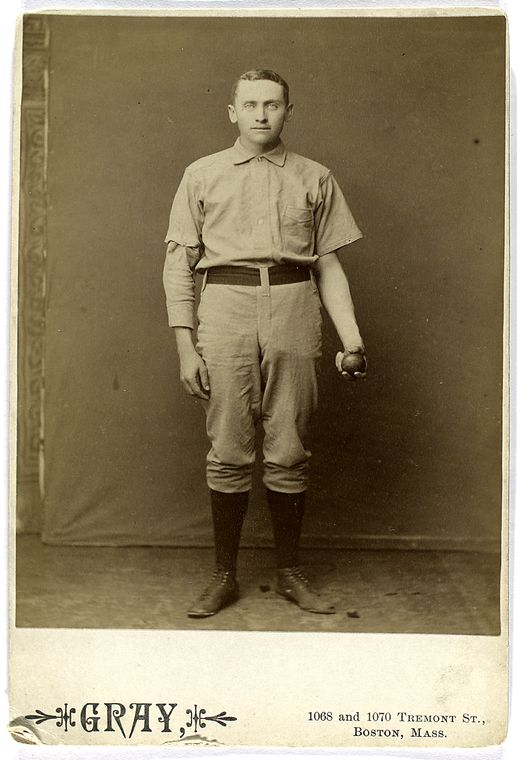
- Pitcher
- Born: November 20, 1862; Binghamton, New York, U.S.
- Died: February 8, 1943 (aged 80); Washington, D.C., U.S.
- Batted: Right Threw: Left

MLB debut
- August 18, 1884, for the Wilmington Quicksteps

Last MLB appearance
- October 4, 1890, for the Syracuse Stars

MLB statistics
- Win–loss record: 96–90
- Earned run average: 3.18
- Strikeouts: 743
- Stats at Baseball Reference

Teams
- Wilmington Quicksteps (1884); Detroit Wolverines (1885); Philadelphia Quakers (1886–1889); Syracuse Stars (1890)

Career highlights and awards
- NL ERA leader (1887)

Daniel Maurice Casey (November 20, 1862 – February 8, 1943) was an American professional baseball player whose career spanned from 1884 to 1894 and 1899. He played in Major League Baseball, principally as a pitcher, over parts of seven seasons for four major league clubs. He saw his most extensive playing time with the Philadelphia Quakers, appearing in 142 games for that team from 1886 to 1889. He also appeared in 46 games for the Syracuse Stars in 1890.

Casey led the National League with a 2.86 earned run average (ERA) and four shutouts in 1887 while playing for Philadelphia. Over the course of his seven seasons in the major leagues, he compiled a 96–90 win–loss record in 201 appearances, with a 3.18 ERA and 743 strikeouts.

In his later years, Casey claimed to be the Casey about whom Ernest L. Thayer wrote his famous poem, "Casey at the Bat." Casey was given a parade honoring him as the famed "Casey", was featured on a national radio broadcast, and participated in a "re-enactment" of "Casey at the Bat" when he was age 78. The poem's author denied that his work was based on any real player, and several sources have called Casey's claim into doubt. Casey had a career batting average of .162 and one home run.

== Early years ==
Casey was born in Binghamton, New York, in 1862. His parents, Hannah and William Casey, immigrated to the United States from Ireland. Casey grew up with five siblings on the family's farm in Broome County, New York, a short distance from Binghamton.

== Professional baseball career ==
=== Wilmington ===
In 1884, Casey began his professional baseball career at age 21 with the Wilmington Quicksteps. He began playing for Wilmington while the team was part of the Eastern League and compiled a 10–2 win–loss record and 1.91 ERA in Eastern League play. Casey continued to play for the Quicksteps after the team joined the Union Association in August 1884, compiling a 1–1 record and 1.00 ERA in two games. The Quicksteps played only 18 games as a major league club and compiled a record of 2–16. Casey was the winning pitcher in one of the two victories in the club's brief major league history; a player known as The Only Nolan was the winning pitcher in the Quicksteps' other victory.

=== Indianapolis and Detroit ===
In 1885, Casey played with two different teams. He began the season with the Indianapolis Hoosiers of the newly formed Western League and compiled a 10–2 win–loss record and a 0.50 ERA in 12 games. In mid-June 1885, the Western League disbanded, and the majority of the Indianapolis players were signed by the Detroit Wolverines of the National League. Casey appeared in 12 games for Detroit and compiled a 4-8 (.333) win–loss record and a 3.29 ERA.

=== Philadelphia ===
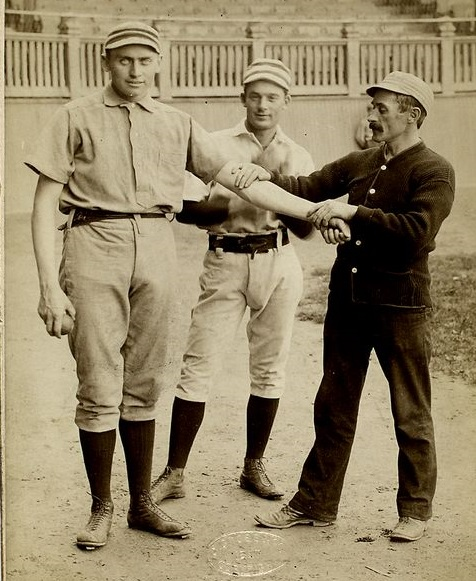
Casey (left) with Charlie Bastian and trainer

Casey was acquired by the Philadelphia Quakers (later renamed the Phillies) of the National League prior to the 1886 season and played with that club for the next four seasons from 1886 to 1889. Casey enjoyed his career best seasons with Philadelphia, winning 66 games from 1886 to 1888.

In 1886, Casey threw 39 complete games and compiled a 24-18 (.571) record. Casey ranked among the National League's leading pitchers with four shutouts (2nd), a 2.41 ERA (6th), a Wins Above Replacement (WAR) rating of 6.2 (6th), a Walks plus hits per inning pitched (WHIP) ratio of 1.165 (7th), 44 games started (8th), 24 wins (9th) and 193 strikeouts (9th).

In 1887, Casey led the league with a 2.86 ERA and four shutouts and compiled a career-best 28-13 (.683) record. He again ranked among the league's leaders pitchers in multiple categories with a 147 Adjusted ERA+ (1st), 10.4 WAR pitcher rating (2nd), a .683 win percentage (3rd), 28 wins (4th), 43 complete games (6th), 390 1/3 innings pitched (6th), 1.260 WHIP (7th), 119 strikeouts (8th).

In 1888, Casey started 33 games, threw 31 complete games, and compiled a 14-18 (.438) record and a 3.15 ERA with 108 strikeouts. His playing time was reduced further in 1889 to 20 games started, as he compiled a 6-10 (.375) record and a 3.77 ERA.

=== Syracuse ===
Casey played during the 1890 season with the Syracuse Stars of the American Association. He appeared as a pitcher in 45 games for Syracuse, threw 40 complete games and 360 2/3 innings, and compiled a 19–22 record and a 4.14 ERA. He appeared in his last major league game on October 4, 1890, at age 27.

=== Minor leagues ===
Although his major league career ended in 1890, Casey continued playing for several years in the minor leagues. His minor league career included stints with clubs in Jamestown and Albany, New York, in 1891, and Binghamton, New York, from 1892 to 1894 and 1899. In 1894, while playing for Binghamton, he struck out 15 batters in an exhibition game against the club from Rochester, New York.

=== "Casey at the Bat" ===
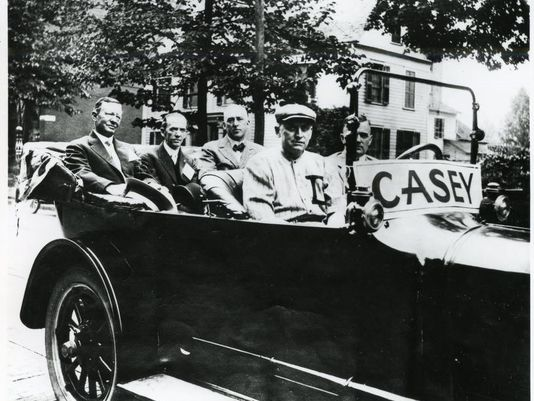
Casey (front passenger seat) in "Casey Day" parade, July 1915

After retiring from baseball, Casey claimed to be the "Casey" about whom Ernest L. Thayer wrote his famous poem, "Casey at the Bat", which had first been published in 1888 by a San Francisco newspaper. Casey claimed that the poem was based on an August 1887 game in which he played for Philadelphia. He asserted that he had hit a "lucky" home run against Boston a week earlier and that Philadelphia trailed, 4–3, when he came to bat and struck out.

In support of his claim that the poem was based on his performance for Philadelphia, Casey pointed out that the Huntington Avenue Grounds where the Philadelphia Quakers played in 1887 was in a neighborhood once called "Mudville", the same name given to the locale in Thayer's poem. Casey claimed the area drew the name "Mudville" because the site was a vast mudhole before the ballpark was built.

Over the years, a number of sources accepted Casey's claim. As early as 1900, after Casey was "scalped" in a streetcar accident, a newspaper account noted that there was "no end" to the persons claiming to be "Casey", but cited Dan Casey as the one true "Casey" who had been immortalized by Thayer. In July 1915, a local Binghamton baseball club, the Bingos, sponsored a "Casey Day" that included a parade honoring Dan Casey as the famed "Casey." In March 1938, Casey appeared on Gabriel Heatter's radio program, broadcast on the Columbia network, to make his claim to being the famous "Casey." During the broadcast, Casey stated:

I've been waiting 50 years to tell you folks that Mighty Casey was just old Dan Casey, a pretty good ball player, but no home run king. But I guess if I hadn't struck out that day I never would have become famous.

After Casey's radio broadcast, The Sporting News published a lengthy profile, complete with a photograph of the 75-year-old Casey with a bat on his shoulder, touting him as the "Inspiration of Thayer's Poem." Two months later, in May 1938, Time magazine published a story referring to Casey as the "Mudville Man." In approximately 1940, a supposed re-enactment of "Casey at the Bat" was played out prior to a Baltimore Orioles game; Rogers Hornsby threw two called strikes to the 78-year-old Dan Casey, and Casey then swung and missed on the third pitch, just as Thayer had written in the poem.

Over the years, other players, including King Kelly and John Cahill, have been suggested as Thayer's inspiration, though Thayer himself reportedly denied that the poem was based on any real player. As early as 1900, Fred Pfeffer rejected Casey's claim: "Now, you listen to me! That poem was never written about that Casey." In February 1943, a columnist in The Sporting News described Casey's claim to be Thayer's inspiration as a "myth" and wrote: "Thayer ... always declared he had no particular player in mind as his hero. But despite this evidence, original 'Caseys' continue to appear, including Daniel, who was the most persistent and told the story so often he unquestionably came to believe it." Another writer examining the claim concluded that the game cited by Casey as the inspiration for Thayer did not end in a 4–3 defeat of Philadelphia. Rather, Casey got a hit in the ninth inning, driving in two runs, and the game was called due to darkness in a 5–5 tie. Yet another writer claimed to have disproved Casey's claim by pointing out that a strikeout required four strikes in 1887, when Casey claimed to have inspired Thayer by swinging and missing on a third pitch. The author of the latter story noted: "In 1887, according to the rules so revised for that season only, Casey would have had another strike coming to him. That he didn't get it is evidence that Thayer was not writing about any incident in 1887 and that the late Dan Casey either was shortchanged, or was not the hero the author had in mind."

== Family and later years ==
Casey was married in December 1889 to Minnie E. Cahill (sometimes later listed as Mary E. Casey) at a ceremony at St. Patrick's Church in Binghamton, New York. Casey and his wife had a daughter, Mable, in 1891.

After retiring from baseball, Casey lived in Binghamton, where he worked from at least 1895 to 1920 as a trolley car operator for the Binghamton Railway Company. By 1930, Casey remained living in Binghamton with his wife, though he was not employed.

After 1935, Casey and his wife later moved to Silver Spring, Maryland, a suburb of Washington, D.C. Casey died in 1943 at age 80 in a hospital in Washington, D.C. He was buried at Fort Lincoln Cemetery in Brentwood, Maryland.

== See also ==
- List of Major League Baseball annual ERA leaders
