= Ike Benners =

American baseball player (1856–1932)

- Left fielder
- Born: June 7, 1856; Philadelphia, Pennsylvania, U.S.
- Died: April 18, 1932 (aged 75); Philadelphia, Pennsylvania, U.S.
- Batted: Left Threw: Unknown

MLB debut
- May 1, 1884, for the Brooklyn Atlantics

Last MLB appearance
- September 3, 1884, for the Wilmington Quicksteps

MLB statistics
- AVG: .185
- HRs: 1
- RBIs: 0
- Stats at Baseball Reference

Teams
- Brooklyn Atlantics (1884); Wilmington Quicksteps (1884)

Isaac B. Benners (June 7, 1856 – April 18, 1932) was an American Major League Baseball player who played mainly left field for two teams during his lone Major League season, the Brooklyn Atlantics of the American Association and Wilmington Quicksteps of the Union Association. Benners died at the age of 75 in his hometown of Philadelphia, and is interred at Fernwood Cemetery in Fernwood, Pennsylvania.
