= Wilmington Quicksteps =

Defunct American baseball team

Coordinates: 39.746769°N 75.574665°W

The Wilmington Quicksteps (also known as the Quickstep Club of Wilmington) were an 1884 late-season replacement baseball team in the Union Association. They finished with a 2–16 (.111) record and were managed by Joe Simmons. The team played their home games in Union Street Park in Wilmington, Delaware.

The ballpark was located on the southwest corner of Union Street and Front Street (now Lancaster Avenue), which at the time was just outside the city limits. The ballpark's life extended well beyond 1884, hosting minor league games until the 1910s.

In 1883, the Inter-State Association of Professional Baseball Clubs was founded, and local capital was invested for a franchise in Wilmington.

In 1884, the Interstate Association re-organized under the name "Eastern League" (not to be confused with the double A Eastern League of today); this was one of the first "minor leagues" and is considered a forerunner of today's AAA International League.The Wilmington Quicksteps quickly began to dominate the league, and so highly regarded was the club that major league clubs began to show up to play exhibition games: they defeated both the Washington Nationals and the Baltimore Monumentals during the season.

By August, the Quicksteps had already sewn up the league championship with a 50–12 record; their dominance nearly destroyed fan interest in the Eastern League, and even in Wilmington, attendance averaged only 400 per game.

Late into the season, Henry Lucas, the Union Association founder and owner of the St. Louis Maroons, convinced Simmons and the Quicksteps to cross over into his league after the Philadelphia Keystones folded.

After winning their first game 4–3 over Washington on August 18, it was all downhill for the Quicksteps, as many players no longer felt bound by their contracts and signed for more money with other teams in their new league. Shortstop and team captain Oyster Burns jumped to the Baltimore Monumentals for $900 a month, followed by outfielder Dennis Casey for $700 a month, while Catcher Andy Cusick jumped to the Philadelphia Phillies for $375 a month; each had been making about $150 a month in Wilmington.

The only star player to remain in Wilmington was pitcher Ed "The Only" Nolan, who went on to beat Washington for Wilmington's second and last victory. But the Quicksteps could not survive the loss of Burns, Casey and Cusick, and the team finished with a meagre batting average of .175 in the Union Association. By this time, however, St. Louis had already won the pennant, so Wilmington's only perceivable purpose was to fill in the last month of the season.

Simmons pulled his team from the field during warm-ups prior to a game against the Kansas City Cowboys on September 21, 1884, after he discovered that he would be unable to pay the $60 gate fee to the visiting Cowboys - the attendance at the game was zero. Wilmington subsequently dropped out of the Union Association and folded, being replaced by the Milwaukee Brewers.

== 1884 season ==
=== Season standings ===
Union Association
Team	W	L	Pct.	GB	Home	Road
St. Louis Maroons	94	19	.832	—	49‍–‍6	45‍–‍13
Cincinnati Outlaw Reds	69	36	.657	21	35‍–‍17	34‍–‍19
Baltimore Monumentals	58	47	.552	32	29‍–‍21	29‍–‍26
Boston Reds	58	51	.532	34	34‍–‍22	24‍–‍29
Milwaukee Brewers	8	4	.667	35½	8‍–‍4	0‍–‍0
St. Paul Saints	2	6	.250	39½	0‍–‍0	2‍–‍6
Chicago Browns/Pittsburgh Stogies	41	50	.451	42	21‍–‍19	20‍–‍31
Altoona Mountain Citys	6	19	.240	44	6‍–‍12	0‍–‍7
Wilmington Quicksteps	2	16	.111	44½	1‍–‍6	1‍–‍10
Washington Nationals (UA)	47	65	.420	46½	36‍–‍27	11‍–‍38
Philadelphia Keystones	21	46	.313	50	14‍–‍21	7‍–‍25
Kansas City Cowboys	16	63	.203	61	11‍–‍23	5‍–‍40

=== Record vs. opponents ===
1884 Union Association record Sources:
Team	ALT	BLU	BSU	CUN	COR	KC	MIL	PHK	SLM	SPS	WST	WIL
Altoona	—	1–3	1–1	0–0	0–3	0–0	0–0	1–3	0–8	0–0	3–1	0–0
Baltimore	3–1	—	10–5–1	7–5	4–10	10–2	1–3	10–2	1–14	0–0	11–5	1–0
Boston	1–1	5–10–1	—	4–8–1	5–11	8–4	2–2	8–3	8–8	0–0	12–4	5–0
Chicago/Pittsburgh	0–0	5–7	8–4–1	—	7–8	12–4	0–0	3–5	2–14	0–0	4–8–1	0–0
Cincinnati	3–0	10–4	11–5	8–7	—	9–1	0–0	9–0	4–12	3–0	10–6	2–1
Kansas City	0–0	2–10	4–8	4–12	1–9	—	0–0	0–4	0–11–1	1–1–1	4–8–1	0–0
Milwaukee	0–0	3–1	2–2	0–0	0–0	0–0	—	0–0	0–0	0–0	3–1	0–0
Philadelphia	3–1	2–10	3–8	5–3	0–9	4–0	0–0	—	0–8	0–0	4–7	0–0
St. Louis	8–0	14–1	8–8	14–2	12–4	11–0–1	0–0	8–0	—	2–1	13–3	4–0
St. Paul	0–0	0–0	0–0	0–0	0–3	1–1–1	0–0	0–0	1–2	—	0–0	0–0
Washington	1–3	5–11	4–12	8–4–1	6–10	8–4–1	1–3	7–4	3–13	0–0	—	4–1
Wilmington	0–0	0–1	0–5	0–0	1–2	0–0	0–0	0–0	0–4	0–0	1–4	—

=== Roster ===
1884 Wilmington Quicksteps
Roster
Pitchers: Jersey Bakely; Dan Casey; Jim McElroy; John Murphy; The Only Nolan; Fred Tenney	Catchers: Andy Cusick; Tom Lynch; Infielders: Charlie Bastian; Oyster Burns; Henry Myers; Jimmy Say; Redleg Snyder	Outfielders: Ike Benners; Dennis Casey; John Cullen; George Fisher; Bill McCloskey; John Munce; Dan Sheahan	Manager: Joe Simmons

== Player stats ==
=== Batting ===
==== Starters by position ====
Note: Pos = Position; G = Games played; AB = At bats; H = Hits; Avg. = Batting average; HR = Home runs

Pos	Player	G	AB	H	Avg.	HR
C	Tom Lynch	16	58	16	.276	0
1B	Redleg Snyder	17	52	10	.192	0
2B	Charlie Bastian	17	60	12	.200	2
SS	Henry Myers	6	24	3	.125	0
3B	Jimmy Say	16	59	13	.220	0
OF	Ike Benners	6	22	1	.045	0
OF	Bill McCloskey	9	30	3	.100	0
OF	John Cullen	9	31	6	.194	0

==== Other batters ====
Note: G = Games played; AB = At bats; H = Hits; Avg. = Batting average; HR = Home runs

Player	G	AB	H	Avg.	HR
Andy Cusick	11	34	5	.147	0
John Murphy	10	31	2	.065	0
George Fisher	8	29	2	.069	0
John Munce	7	21	4	.190	0
Dennis Casey	2	8	2	.250	0
Oyster Burns	2	7	1	.143	0
Dan Sheahan	2	6	1	.167	0
Jim McElroy	1	2	0	.000	0

=== Pitching ===
==== Starting pitchers ====
Note: G = Games pitched; IP = Innings pitched; W = Wins; L = Losses; ERA = Earned run average; SO = Strikeouts

Player	G	IP	W	L	ERA	SO
John Murphy	7	48.0	0	6	3.27	27
The Only Nolan	5	40.0	1	4	2.93	52
Dan Casey	2	18.0	1	1	1.00	10
Jersey Bakely	2	17.0	0	2	4.24	9
Fred Tenney	1	8.0	0	1	1.13	10
Jim McElroy	1	5.0	0	1	10.80	3

==== Relief pitchers ====
Note: G = Games pitched; W = Wins; L = Losses; SV = Saves; ERA = Earned run average; SO = Strikeouts

Player	G	W	L	SV	ERA	SO
Charlie Bastian	1	0	0	0	3.00	2

== Notes ==
Park coordinates are approximately 39.746769, -75.574665

== See also ==
- Wilmington Blue Rocks
- List of professional sports teams in Delaware
