= Bill McCloskey =

American baseball player (1854–1924)

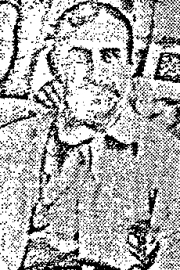
- Catcher / Outfielder
- Born: May 1854; Philadelphia, Pennsylvania, U.S.
- Died: July 9, 1924 (aged 70); Philadelphia, Pennsylvania, U.S.
- Batted: Unknown Threw: Unknown

Last MLB appearance
- September 9, 1884, for the Wilmington Quicksteps

MLB statistics
- Batting average: .143
- Games: 20
- Hits: 10
- Stats at Baseball Reference

Teams
- Washington Nationals (1875); Wilmington Quicksteps (1884)

William George McCloskey (May 1854 – July 9, 1924) officially played two years of Major League Baseball, in 1875 for the Washington Nationals, debuting on May 25, and in 1884 for the Wilmington Quicksteps of the Union Association.

== Biography ==
McCloskey played eleven games for the Washington Nationals in 1875 at catcher, batting .175 (7-for-40) with one run and four RBI. He played nine games in the 1884 season, splitting time between the outfield and catcher. In thirty at bats, he had three hits for a .100 batting average.

Baseball historian David Nemec has argued that the evidence is "fairly persuasive" that the "McCloskey" who pitched for Washington in 1875 is Bill McCloskey.

== Death and interment ==
McCloskey died at the age of seventy in his hometown of Philadelphia, Pennsylvania on July 9, 1924, and was interred at the Arlington Cemetery in Drexel Hill, Pennsylvania.
