= Redleg Snyder =

American baseball player (1854–1932)

- Outfielder
- Born: December 12, 1854; Camden, New Jersey, U.S.
- Died: November 24, 1932 (aged 77); Camden, New Jersey, U.S.
- Batted: Right Threw: Right

MLB debut
- April 25, 1876, for the Cincinnati Reds

Last MLB appearance
- September 12, 1884, for the Wilmington Quicksteps

MLB statistics
- Batting average: .160
- Hits: 41
- At bats: 257
- Stats at Baseball Reference

Teams
- Cincinnati Reds (1876); Wilmington Quicksteps (1884)

Emanuel Sebastian Snyder (born Emanuel Sebastian Schneider) (December 12, 1854 – November 24, 1932) was an American Major League Baseball player. He played for the 1876 Cincinnati Reds and 1884 Wilmington Quicksteps.
