= Dan Sheahan =

American baseball player (1859–1897)

- Outfielder
- Born: 1859; Washington, D.C., U.S.
- Died: May 3, 1897 (aged 37–38); Limerick, Ireland
- Batted: Unknown Threw: Unknown

MLB debut
- April 19, 1884, for the Washington Nationals

Last MLB appearance
- August 23, 1884, for the Wilmington Quicksteps

MLB statistics
- Batting average: .147
- Home runs: 0
- hits: 5
- Stats at Baseball Reference

Teams
- Washington Nationals (1884); Wilmington Quicksteps (1884)

Daniel Sheahan (1859 – May 3, 1897) was a Major League Baseball player. He played nine games for two different teams in the Union Association, mostly as an outfielder.

Sheahan is listed in some sources as Sheehan. Sheahan appears to have played at least one game as "John M. Ryan", though not to be confused with another John Ryan who played professionally at the same time.

After departing his short baseball career, Sheahan spent time as a police officer in Washington, D.C., including a notable incident in which he shot and killed an intoxicated man named Addison Coleman. By 1888, Sheahan resigned from the police force due to being shot while on-duty and related stress, and by 1894 he was noted as in residence in an insane asylum in Limerick, Ireland, where he died in 1897. He is still the only MLB player to die in Ireland.

== Sources ==
- Career statistics from Baseball Reference · Retrosheet
- Retrosheet
