= John Cullen (baseball) =

American baseball player (1854–1921)

- Outfielder
- Born: July 9, 1854; New Orleans, Louisiana, U.S.
- Died: February 11, 1921 (aged 66); Ukiah, California, U.S.
- Batted: Unknown Threw: Unknown

MLB debut
- August 18, 1884, for the Wilmington Quicksteps

Last MLB appearance
- September 3, 1884, for the Wilmington Quicksteps

MLB statistics
- Batting average: .194
- Games: 9
- Hits: 6
- Stats at Baseball Reference

Teams
- Wilmington Quicksteps (1884)

John Joseph Cullen (July 9, 1854 – February 11, 1921) was a 19th-century American professional baseball player who officially played one year of Major League Baseball in 1884 for the Wilmington Quicksteps of the Union Association.
