= Tom Lynch (baseball) =

American baseball player (1860–1955)

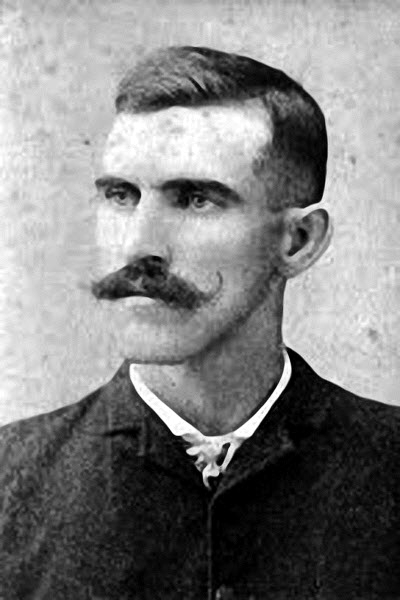
- Outfielder
- Born: April 3, 1860; Bennington, Vermont, U.S.
- Died: March 28, 1955 (aged 94); Cohoes, New York, U.S.
- Batted: Left Threw: Right

MLB debut
- August 18, 1884, for the Wilmington Quicksteps

Last MLB appearance
- June 3, 1885, for the Philadelphia Quakers

MLB statistics
- Batting average: .258
- Home runs: 0
- Runs scored: 20
- Stats at Baseball Reference

Teams
- Wilmington Quicksteps (1884); Philadelphia Quakers (1884–1885)

Thomas James Lynch (April 3, 1860 – March 28, 1955) was an American Major League Baseball player. He played two seasons in the majors, 1884 and 1885. He made his debut in the short-lived Union Association with the even shorter-lived Wilmington Quicksteps, where he started 16 games during their 18-game tenure; eight as a catcher and eight as an outfielder. After the Quicksteps folded, Lynch resurfaced later in 1884 with the Philadelphia Quakers, where he also equally split his time between catching and outfield duties. He finished up his career with the Quakers in 1885, playing 13 games in the outfield.
