= Fred Tenney (outfielder) =

American baseball player (1859–1919)

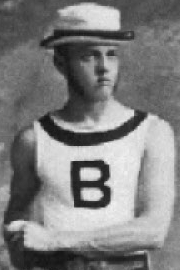
- Outfielder
- Born: July 9, 1859; Marlborough, New Hampshire, U.S.
- Died: June 15, 1919 (aged 59); Fall River, Massachusetts, U.S.
- Batted: Unknown Threw: Unknown

MLB debut
- April 28, 1884, for the Washington Nationals

Last MLB appearance
- August 28, 1884, for the Wilmington Quicksteps

MLB statistics
- Batting average: .216
- Home runs: 0
- Runs batted in: 0
- Stats at Baseball Reference

Teams
- Washington Nationals (1884); Boston Reds (1884); Wilmington Quicksteps (1884)

Fred Clay Tenney (July 9, 1859 – June 15, 1919) was an American professional baseball player whose career spanned two seasons, one of which was spent with the Union Association (UA) Washington Nationals, Boston Reds, and Wilmington Quicksteps. He also played one season of minor league baseball for the Hartford Babies. Tenney spent the majority of his professional career as an outfielder, but also served as a first baseman and as a pitcher. He played collegiate ball at Brown University.

After retiring from baseball, Tenney became a lawyer and the superintendent of schools for Holliston, Massachusetts, before his death on June 15, 1919.

== Early life ==
Tenney was born on July 9, 1859, in Marlborough, New Hampshire, to Henry Clay and Julia C. (née Stebbins) Tenney. Henry served as the principal of Mettowee Academy and the Peterborough, New Hampshire school. Growing up, Tenney had one sibling, Lockhart S. (born November 2, 1865).

== Career ==
Tenney attended Brown University and served as a pitcher during his senior year. Tenney lost in his college debut to Harvard, 5–3. He completed his college career with a 4–2 record. He graduated the university with a Bachelor of Arts degree in 1880, and was a member of the Beta Theta Pi fraternity. From 1881 to 1885, Tenney was high school principal in Yarmouth, Massachusetts, and in 1883 he played on the Yarmouth town baseball team in what is now the Cape Cod Baseball League. He married Saidee Waterman of Sandwich, Massachusetts in October 1884.

In 1884, Tenney began his professional career for the Nationals, where he spent the majority of his 38-game career. Over 32 games with the team, Tenney batted .235 with a triple and 32 runs scored, while playing 27 games in the outfield and six games at first base for the club. He also appeared in four games as a pitcher for the Reds, allowing nine earned runs over 35 innings pitched. In his only game played for the Quicksteps, Tenney allowed one earned run in a complete game loss. He finished his career with a 2.09 earned run average over 43.0 innings pitched. The following season, Tenney played for the Hartford Babies of the Southern New England League, appearing in three games for the team. Reports indicated that an arm injury may have ended his professional career.

== After baseball ==
After retiring from baseball, Tenney became a lawyer, publishing agent, then principal and superintendent of schools in Holliston, Massachusetts. Tenney died on June 15, 1919, in Fall River, Massachusetts, and was interred at Lake Grove Cemetery in Holliston.
