= Andy Cusick =

American baseball player (1857–1929)

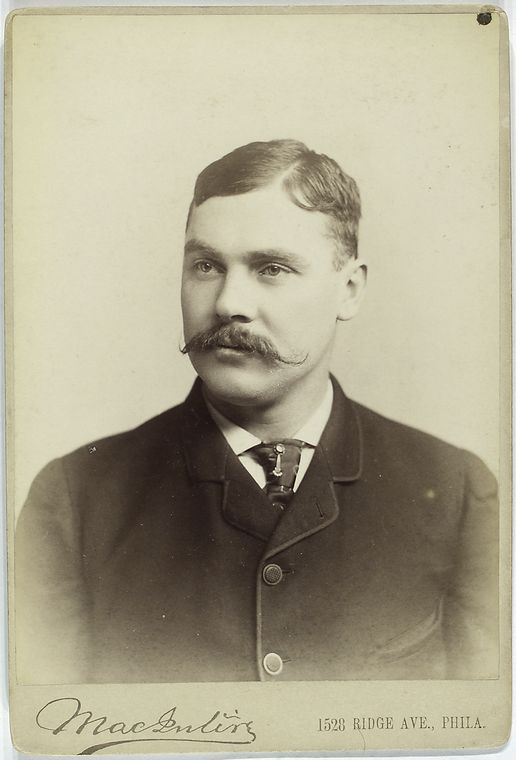
- Catcher
- Born: December 1857; Limerick, Ireland
- Died: August 6, 1929 (aged 71); Chicago, Illinois, U.S.
- Batted: Right Threw: Right

Major league debut
- August 21, 1884, for the Wilmington Quicksteps

Last major league appearance
- June 15, 1887, for the Philadelphia Quakers

Major league statistics
- Games played: 95
- Batting average: .193
- Runs batted in: 15
- Stats at Baseball Reference

Teams
- Wilmington Quicksteps (1884); Philadelphia Quakers (1884–1887)

Andrew J. Cusick (December 1857 – August 6, 1929) was an American professional baseball catcher who played in the major leagues from 1884 to 1887. He played for the Wilmington Quicksteps and Philadelphia Quakers. Cusick was 5 feet, 9 inches tall and weighed 190 pounds.

== Playing career ==
Cusick was born in Limerick, Ireland, in 1857. He started his professional baseball career in 1883 with the Interstate League's Wilmington Quicksteps. The following season, he played for the Quicksteps of the Eastern League and Union Association and made his major league debut in August. Later that month, Cusick jumped to the National League's Philadelphia Quakers. He had a batting average of .143 in 20 MLB games that season.

Cusick was a back-up catcher for the Quakers for the next few years. In 1885, he played in 39 games and led the NL's catchers in errors, with 57, while batting .177. His final MLB appearance was in June 1887. He then signed with the Western Association's Milwaukee Brewers for 1888, as a first baseman. The Sporting Life reported that "[Cusick] comes to Milwaukee highly recommended by Fogarty, Wood and Mulvey, of the Philadelphias, who say he is a good batsman, a No. 1 baseman, and, if necessary, can go behind the bat and hold up that position with the best of them." After batting .260 in 48 games, Cusick was released in July, and his playing career ended. In 95 career major league games, he batted .193 with no home runs and 15 runs batted in.

== Later life ==
In May 1889, Cusick got a job as an umpire in the Western Association. According to the Sporting Life that month, "[Cusick] umpired the Omaha series, and gave fair satisfaction. His decisions were not in favor of one club more than another but his base decisions were decidedly off color." After he umpired a game in June, the Milwaukee Journal reported that he "gave some very doubtful decisions on both sides and was especially incorrect on calling balls and strikes and of course brought down the anathemas of the vigorous-lunged 'bleachers' upon himself in consequence."

Cusick continued to umpire games during the 1890 season. By January 1891, he had become a deputy constable in St. Louis. He died in Chicago, in 1929 and was buried in Mt. Olivet Cemetery.

== See also ==
- List of players from Ireland in Major League Baseball
