= John Munce =

American baseball player (1857–1917)

- Outfielder
- Born: November 18, 1857; Philadelphia, Pennsylvania, U.S.
- Died: March 15, 1917 (aged 59); Philadelphia, Pennsylvania, U.S.
- Batted: Unknown Threw: Unknown

MLB debut
- August 19, 1884, for the Wilmington Quicksteps

Last MLB appearance
- September 5, 1884, for the Wilmington Quicksteps

MLB statistics
- Batting average: .190
- Games played: 7
- Hits: 4
- Stats at Baseball Reference

Teams
- Wilmington Quicksteps (1884)

John Lewis Munce (November 18, 1857 – March 15, 1917) was an American Major League Baseball player. Nicknamed "Big John", Munce played for the Wilmington Quicksteps in 1884.

He was born and died in Philadelphia, Pennsylvania.
