= Henry Wilson (baseball) =

American baseball player (1876–1929)

- Catcher
- Born: January 1, 1876; Baltimore, Maryland, U.S.
- Died: April 15, 1929 (aged 53); Knoxville, Tennessee, U.S.
- Batted: Unknown Threw: Unknown

MLB debut
- October 12, 1898, for the Baltimore Orioles

Last MLB appearance
- October 12, 1898, for the Baltimore Orioles

MLB statistics
- Games played: 1
- At bats: 2
- Hits: 0
- Stats at Baseball Reference

Teams
- Baltimore Orioles (1898)

Harry Clayton Wilson (January 1, 1876 – April 15, 1929) was an American professional baseball player. He played in one game as a catcher for the Baltimore Orioles during the 1898 season. He was born in Baltimore, Maryland.
