= Charlie Bastian =

American baseball player (1858–1943)

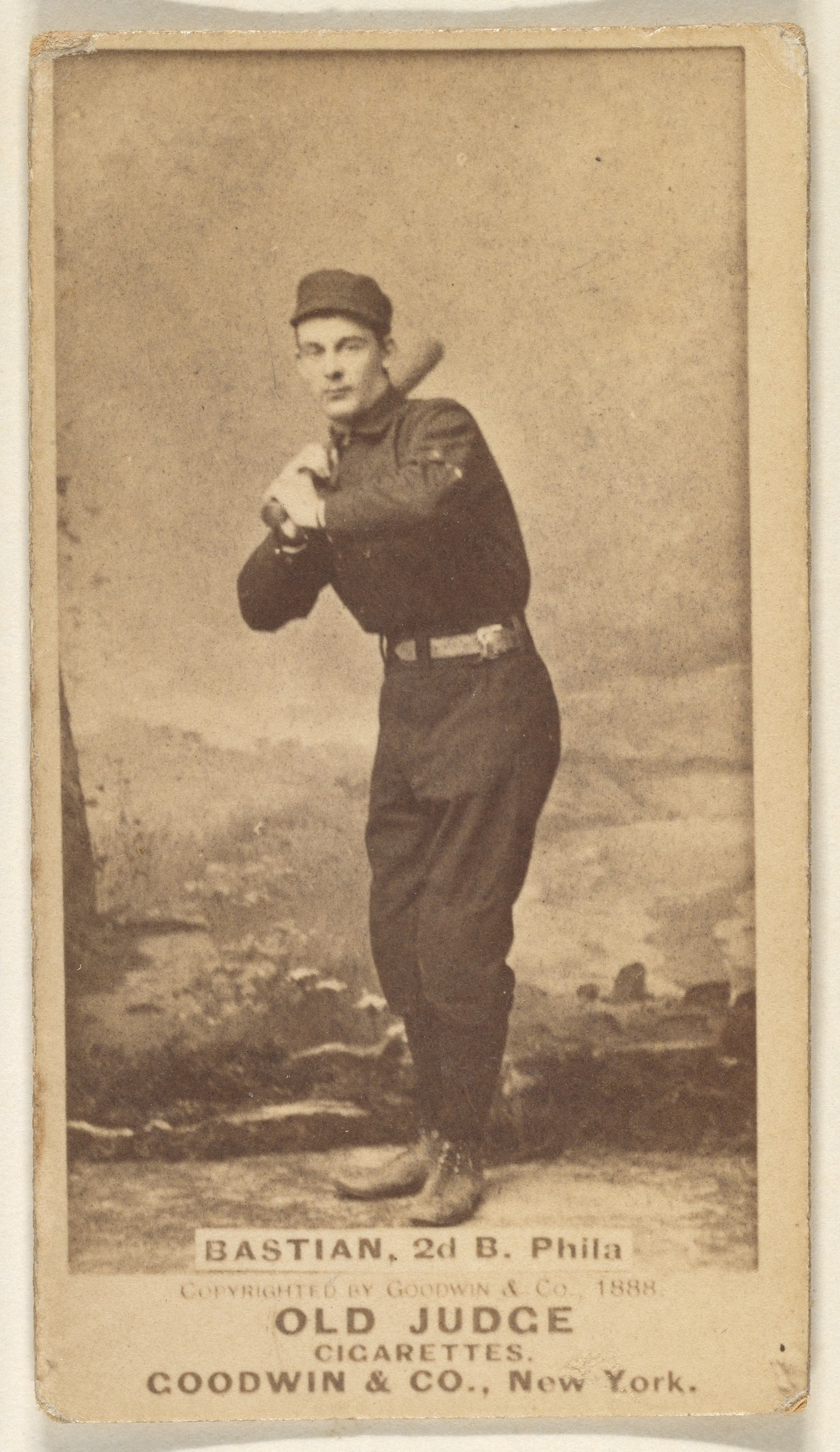
- Shortstop
- Born: July 4, 1860; Philadelphia, Pennsylvania, US
- Died: January 18, 1932 (aged 71); Pennsauken, New Jersey, US
- Batted: Right Threw: Right

MLB debut
- August 18, 1884, for the Wilmington Quicksteps

Last MLB appearance
- August 22, 1891, for the Philadelphia Phillies

MLB statistics
- Batting average: .189
- Home runs: 11
- Runs batted in: 144
- Stats at Baseball Reference

Teams
- Wilmington Quicksteps (1884); Kansas City Cowboys (1884); Philadelphia Quakers (1885–1888); Chicago White Stockings (1889); Chicago Pirates (1890); Cincinnati Kelly's Killers (1891); Philadelphia Phillies (1891)

Charles A. Bastian (March 2, 1858 – November 10, 1943) was an American professional baseball infielder. He played in Major League Baseball (MLB) for the Wilmington Quicksteps, Kansas City Cowboys, Philadelphia Quakers, Chicago White Stockings, Chicago Pirates, Cincinnati Kelly's Killers, and Philadelphia Phillies.

Debuting with the Wilmington Quicksteps in 1884, Bastian played just 17 games before moving on to Union Association rival Kansas City Cowboys, where he tallied another eleven. After the demise of the UA, Bastian signed with the Philadelphia Quakers of the National League. He became the club's everyday shortstop, playing 103 games but hitting only .167 with 4 home runs and 29 RBI. He also led the league in strikeouts with 82. Despite this, in 1886, Bastian became the regular second baseman for the Quakers. His production increased a bit as he hit .217 with 2 home runs and 38 RBI, and he placed in the league's top ten in triples. However, as his offense was still subpar, Bastian lost his starting job for 1887, remaining with the team as a utility infielder that season and the next.

The Chicago White Stockings (predecessors of the Cubs) were Bastian's next stop, as they purchased him from Philadelphia. With the Cubs, Bastian's performance bottomed out. He batted a career-low .135 and played in just 46 games. Bastian jumped to the fledgling Players' League in 1890, signing with the Chicago Pirates, where he was once again an everyday shortstop. However, his lack of offensive production continued to plague him, as Bastian failed to hit .200 for a third consecutive season.

Bastian played a game each for the Cincinnati Kelly's Killers and his old Philadelphia Quakers, now the Philadelphia Phillies, in 1891 before hanging up his glove after his final appearance on August 22. In a 504-game career, Bastian hit just .189 with eleven home runs and 144 RBI.

Bastian died on January 18, 1932, in Pennsauken, New Jersey.

== Sources ==
- Career statistics from Baseball Reference · Baseball Reference (Minors) · Retrosheet · Baseball Almanac
