= Bill Kissinger =

American baseball player (1871–1929)

- Pitcher
- Born: August 15, 1871; Dayton, Kentucky, U.S.
- Died: April 20, 1929 (aged 57); Cincinnati, Ohio, U.S.
- Batted: Right Threw: Right

MLB debut
- May 30, 1895, for the Baltimore Orioles

Last MLB appearance
- June 10, 1897, for the St. Louis Browns

MLB statistics
- Win–loss record: 7-25
- Strikeouts: 61
- Earned run average: 6.99
- Stats at Baseball Reference

Teams
- Baltimore Orioles (1895); St. Louis Browns (1895–1897)

William Francis Kissinger (born August 15, 1871 – April 20, 1929), nicknamed "Shang", was an American Major League Baseball player. Primarily a pitcher, Kissinger played all or part of three seasons from 1895-1897 for the Baltimore Orioles and St. Louis Browns.

He was born in Dayton, Kentucky and died in Cincinnati.
