= Dennis Casey (baseball) =

American baseball player (1858–1909)

- Outfielder
- Born: March 30, 1858; Binghamton, New York, U.S.
- Died: January 19, 1909 (aged 50); Binghamton, New York, U.S.
- Batted: Left Threw: Right

MLB debut
- August 18, 1884, for the Wilmington Quicksteps

Last MLB appearance
- July 24, 1885, for the Baltimore Orioles

MLB statistics
- Batting average: .273
- On-base percentage: .721
- Slugging percentage: .401
- Stats at Baseball Reference

Teams
- Wilmington Quicksteps (1884); Baltimore Orioles (1884–1885)

Dennis Patrick Casey (March 30, 1858 – January 19, 1909) was an American professional baseball player who played outfield in the Major Leagues from 1884-1885. He would play for the Wilmington Quicksteps and Baltimore Orioles. Dennis Patrick Casey is rumored to be the infamous "Casey at the Bat".
