= Law Daniels =

American baseball player (1862–1929)

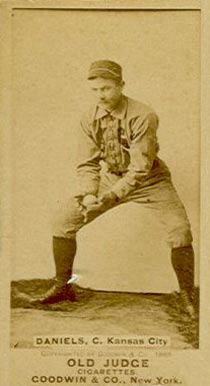
- Catcher/Outfielder
- Born: July 14, 1862; Newton, Massachusetts, U.S.
- Died: January 7, 1929 (aged 66); Waltham, Massachusetts, U.S.
- Batted: Right Threw: Right

MLB debut
- April 25, 1887, for the Baltimore Orioles

Last MLB appearance
- October 7, 1887, for the Kansas City Cowboys

MLB statistics
- Batting average: .225
- Home runs: 2
- Runs batted in: 60
- Stats at Baseball Reference

Teams
- Baltimore Orioles (1887); Kansas City Cowboys (1888)

Lawrence Long Daniels (July 14, 1862 – January 7, 1929) was an American Major League Baseball player who played catcher and outfielder. He played for the Baltimore Orioles and Kansas City Cowboys of the American Association from 1887 to 1888.
