= Bill Gardner (baseball) =

American baseball player

William A. Gardner
- Pitcher
- Born: September 6, 1866; Baltimore, Maryland, United States
- Died: October 12, 1948 (aged 82); Catonsville, Maryland
- Batted: Unknown Threw: Unknown

MLB debut
- August 9, 1887, for the Baltimore Orioles

Last MLB appearance
- September 6, 1887, for the Baltimore Orioles

MLB statistics
- Win–loss record: 0–1
- Earned run average: 11.08
- Strikeouts: 3
- Stats at Baseball Reference

Teams
- Baltimore Orioles 1887

William A. Gardner (September 6, 1868 – Unknown) was an American professional baseball player who played three games for the Baltimore Orioles of the American Association in 1887. He was born in Baltimore, Maryland.
