= Joe Evers =

American baseball player (1891-1949)

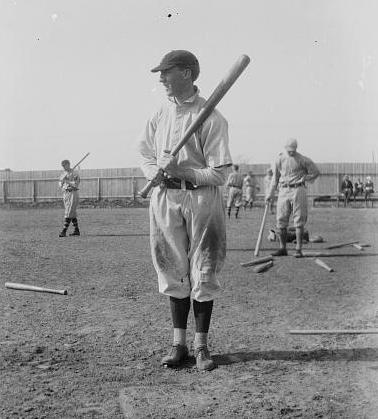
- Pinch runner
- Born: September 10, 1891; Troy, New York, U.S.
- Died: January 4, 1949 (aged 57); Albany, New York, U.S.
- Batted: Right Threw: Right

MLB debut
- April 24, 1913, for the New York Giants

Last MLB appearance
- April 24, 1913, for the New York Giants

MLB statistics
- Games played: 1
- At bats: 0
- Hits: 0
- Stats at Baseball Reference

Teams
- New York Giants (1913)

Joseph Francis Evers (September 10, 1891 – January 4, 1949) was an American pinch runner in Major League Baseball. He appeared in one game for the New York Giants in 1913. His brother was Hall of Famer Johnny Evers. In addition to his very brief appearance in the Majors, he was a second baseman in the minor leagues from 1913 to 1924, spending half his career in Terre Haute, Indiana. He was a player/manager for the 1917 Richmond Quakers of the Central League.
