= Ed Whiting =

American baseball player

- Catcher
- Born: 1860; Philadelphia, Pennsylvania, US
- Died: Unknown
- Batted: Left Threw: Right

MLB debut
- May 2, 1882, for the Baltimore Orioles

Last MLB appearance
- October 11, 1884, for the Louisville Eclipse

MLB statistics
- Batting average: .262
- Home runs: 2
- Runs batted in: 18
- Stats at Baseball Reference

Teams
- Baltimore Orioles (1882); Louisville Eclipse (1883–1884)

Edward C. Whiting (1860 – ???) was an American professional baseball player who played catcher in the Major Leagues from 1882 to 1884. He would play for the Baltimore Orioles and Louisville Eclipse. He was the uncle of Jesse Whiting.
