= Tom Evers =

American baseball player (1852–1925)

- Second baseman
- Born: March 31, 1852; Troy, New York, U.S.
- Died: March 21, 1925 (aged 72); Washington, D.C., U.S.
- Batted: Unknown Threw: Left

MLB debut
- May 25, 1882, for the Baltimore Orioles

Last MLB appearance
- October 16, 1884, for the Washington Nationals

MLB statistics
- Batting average: .230
- Home runs: 0
- Runs batted in: 0
- Stats at Baseball Reference

Teams
- Baltimore Orioles (1882); Washington Nationals (1884)

Thomas Francis Evers (March 31, 1852 – March 21, 1925) was an American professional baseball player who primarily played second base in the American Association for the 1882 Baltimore Orioles and for the 1884 Washington Nationals of the Union Association. He is the uncle of Johnny Evers and Joe Evers.

Evers was born in Troy, New York. In the early 1880s, he moved to Washington, D.C. and worked at the Pension Bureau. He later transferred to the office of adjutant general at the U.S. War Department. He remained with the War Department until 1923.

Evers married Edith Blackstone, daughter of Mrs. Edith Tutwiler, of Washington, D.C. He died on March 21, 1925, at his home on Park Road in Washington, D.C. He was buried in Oak Hill Cemetery.
