= Nick Scharf =

American baseball player (1858–1937)

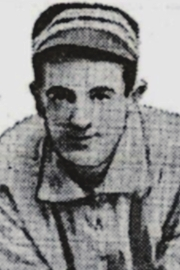
- Outfielder
- Born: July 18, 1858; Baltimore, Maryland, U.S.
- Died: May 11, 1937 (aged 78); Baltimore, Maryland, U.S.
- Batted: Unknown Threw: Right

MLB debut
- May 18, 1882, for the Baltimore Orioles

Last MLB appearance
- June 11, 1883, for the Baltimore Orioles

MLB statistics
- At bats: 52
- RBI: 0
- Home runs: 1
- Batting average: .208
- Stats at Baseball Reference

Teams
- Baltimore Orioles 1882 – 1883

Edward T. "Nick" Scharf (July 18, 1858 – May 11, 1937) was an American professional baseball player who played parts of two seasons for the Baltimore Orioles of the American Association in the early days of Major League Baseball. He was born in Baltimore, Maryland and died there at the age of 78.
