= John Russ (baseball) =

American baseball player (1858–1912)

- Outfielder/Pitcher
- Born: April 1, 1858; Cannelton, Indiana
- Died: January 18, 1912 (aged 53); Louisville, Kentucky
- Batted: Unknown Threw: Unknown

MLB debut
- July 4, 1882, for the Baltimore Orioles

Last MLB appearance
- July 4, 1882, for the Baltimore Orioles

MLB statistics
- Batting average: .333
- Hits: 1
- Earned run average: 3.00
- Win–loss record: 0–0
- Stats at Baseball Reference

Teams
- Baltimore Orioles (1882)

John Russ (April 1, 1858 – January 18, 1912) was a professional baseball player who played in one game for the 1882 Baltimore Orioles of the American Association. He played in the outfield and pitched in the game.
