= Doc Landis =

American baseball player

- Pitcher / Outfielder
- Born: August 16, 1854; Philadelphia, Pennsylvania, U.S.
- Died: unknown unknown
- Batted: Right Threw: Unknown

MLB debut
- May 2, 1882, for the Philadelphia Athletics

Last MLB appearance
- September 30, 1882, for the Baltimore Orioles

MLB statistics
- Win–loss record: 17–28
- Earned run average: 3.32
- Strikeouts: 75
- Stats at Baseball Reference

Teams
- Philadelphia Athletics (1882); Baltimore Orioles (1882)

Samuel H. "Doc" Landis (August 16, 1854 – unknown) was an American Major League Baseball player who played pitcher in 1882.

== Biography ==
Landis would play for the Philadelphia Athletics and Baltimore Orioles. He was married to Mary Ida Weidner on August 1, 1883, and lived for a time in Reading, Pennsylvania where he continued to play baseball. They had two children together, Mary C. Landis (Allgier) and Floyd Wesley Landis. Doc and Mary Ida would divorce around 1890. After baseball he was employed as a railroad foreman

Doc's son Floyd was also a baseball player and an actor in vaudeville, using the stage name of Patsy Flanagan.
