= Frank Burt (baseball) =

American baseball player

- Leftfielder
- Born: Camden, New Jersey, U.S.
- Batted: Unknown Threw: Unknown

MLB debut
- May 2, 1882, for the Baltimore Orioles

Last MLB appearance
- May 30, 1882, for the Baltimore Orioles

MLB statistics
- Batting Average: .111
- Home Runs: 0
- RBI: 0
- Stats at Baseball Reference

Teams
- Baltimore Orioles (1882)

Frank J. Burt was an American professional baseball player who primarily played left field in the American Association for the 1882 Baltimore Orioles.
