= John Shetzline =

American baseball player (1852–1892)

- Third baseman
- Born: 1852; Philadelphia, Pennsylvania, U.S.
- Died: December 15, 1892 (aged 39–40); Philadelphia, Pennsylvania, U.S.
- Batted: Unknown Threw: Unknown

MLB debut
- May 2, 1882, for the Baltimore Orioles

Last MLB appearance
- September 30, 1882, for the Baltimore Orioles

MLB statistics
- Games played: 73
- Batting average: .220
- Runs batted in: 0
- Stats at Baseball Reference

Teams
- Baltimore Orioles (1882)

John Henry Shetzline (1852 – December 15, 1892) was an American professional baseball player who primarily played third base in the American Association for the 1882 Baltimore Orioles.
