= Charlie Waitt =

American baseball player (1853–1912)

- First baseman
- Born: October 14, 1853; Hallowell, Maine, U.S.
- Died: October 21, 1912 (aged 59); San Francisco, California, U.S.
- Batted: Unknown Threw: Right

MLB debut
- May 22, 1875, for the St. Louis Brown Stockings

Last MLB appearance
- September 18, 1883, for the Philadelphia Quakers

MLB statistics
- Batting average: .165
- Strikeouts: 11
- Home runs: 0
- Stats at Baseball Reference

Teams
- St. Louis Brown Stockings (1875); Chicago White Stockings (1877); Baltimore Orioles (1882–1883); Philadelphia Quakers (1883)

Charles C. Waitt (October 14, 1853 – October 21, 1912), born in Hallowell, Maine, was an American professional baseball player who played a total of four professional baseball seasons. Waitt played in an era when baseball had many differences from modern baseball. He was 5 feet 11 inches (1.80 m) in height, and 165 pounds (75 kg) in weight. He threw right-handed, but it is unknown whether he batted right or left-handed.

== Career ==
Charlie Waitt made his major league baseball debut on May 25, 1875 at age 22 with professional baseball club St. Louis Brown Stockings. While playing for the St. Louis Brown Stockings, Waitt had 113 at-bats, 23 runs, 2 base on balls, and 7 strikeouts.

Waitt is probably best known for being one of the first baseball players to wear a glove. He began wearing it around the 1875 baseball season, and was teased, taunted, laughed at by fans and his teammates, and called a "sissy" for doing so. The glove, which he wore to protect his hand, was very different from the gloves used today. He attempted to disguise them by using flesh-coloured gloves to make them as inconspicuous as possible.

After not playing the 1876 baseball season, Waitt was purchased from the St. Louis Brown Stockings by the Chicago White Stockings (today named the Chicago Cubs). With the Chicago White Stockings, he had only 41 at-bats, 4 hits, and 2 RBI. Five years later, the Chicago White Stockings gave away Waitt, who was purchased by the Baltimore Orioles in 1882. He had the most at-bats playing for them, some 250. He was traded to the Philadelphia Quakers in 1883. Waitt played his final baseball game on September 18, 1883.

== Death ==
Waitt died on October 21, 1912, at age 59. He accidentally fell while washing a window. He was buried in the Sunset Cemetery in San Francisco.
