= Harry Ely (baseball) =

American baseball player (1868–1925)

- Pitcher
- Born: August 13, 1868
- Died: May 11, 1925 (aged 56)
- Batted: Unknown Threw: Unknown

MLB debut
- September 24, 1892, for the Baltimore Orioles

Last MLB appearance
- September 24, 1892, for the Baltimore Orioles

MLB statistics
- Win–loss record: 0–1
- Earned run average: 7.71
- Strikeouts: 0
- Stats at Baseball Reference

Teams
- Baltimore Orioles (1892)

Harry Ely (August 13, 1868 – May 11, 1925) was an American professional baseball player who played for the Baltimore Orioles in 1892.
