= Robert M. Keating =

American baseball player (1862–1922)

Bob Keating
- Pitcher
- Born: September 22, 1862; Springfield, Massachusetts, U.S.
- Died: January 19, 1922 (aged 59); Springfield, Massachusetts, U.S.
- Batted: Left Threw: Left

MLB debut
- August 27, 1887, for the Baltimore Orioles

Last MLB appearance
- August 27, 1887, for the Baltimore Orioles

MLB statistics
- Win–loss record: 0–1
- Strikeouts: 0
- Earned run average: 11.00
- Stats at Baseball Reference

Teams
- Baltimore Orioles (1887)

Robert M. Keating (September 22, 1862 – January 19, 1922) was an American inventor and one-time Major League Baseball pitcher for the Baltimore Orioles. He was best known as the inventor of the Keating bicycle.

He appeared in one game for the Orioles on August 27, 1887—pitching a complete game, allowing 16 runs on 16 hits in the loss. An arm injury ended his career and he became an inventor, starting off by inventing various shaving devices.

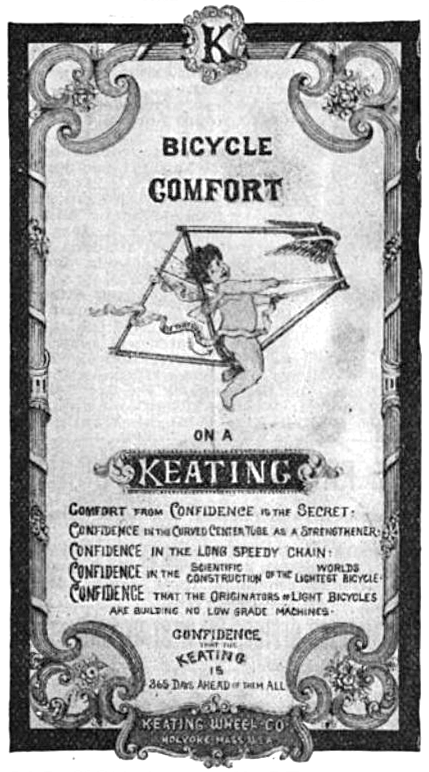
1896 ad for Keating bicycles

In 1897, he started the R.M. Keating Company that manufactured bicycles, through his Keating Wheel Works subsidiary. Keating had some success for a time with his bicycle business and may even have invented the first motorcycle, though the company apparently folded before any were released.
