= Henry Myers (shortstop) =

American baseball player (1858–1895)

- Shortstop
- Born: May 1858; Philadelphia, Pennsylvania, US
- Died: April 18, 1895 (aged 36); Philadelphia, Pennsylvania, US
- Batted: Right Threw: Right

MLB debut
- August 20, 1881, for the Providence Grays

Last MLB appearance
- September 12, 1884, for the Wilmington Quicksteps

MLB statistics
- Batting average: .174
- Home runs: 0
- Runs scored: 46
- Stats at Baseball Reference

Teams
- As player: Providence Grays (1881); Baltimore Orioles (1882); Wilmington Quicksteps (1884); As manager: Baltimore Orioles (1882)

Henry C. Myers (May, 1858 – April 18, 1895) was an American Major League Baseball player from Philadelphia, Pennsylvania, who played mainly at shortstop for three seasons from 1881 to 1884.

After only playing one game for the Providence Grays during the 1881 season, he was part of the Baltimore Orioles of the American Association in 1882. The team had many players with little or no Major League experience, and like Myers, many were from the Philadelphia area. Besides playing shortstop for the Orioles, he was also the manager. They finished last, 14 1/2 games behind the 5th place team, with a 19–54 win–loss record. He would never manage again, and made a short playing appearance in 1884 for the Wilmington Quicksteps of the Union Association.

Henry died in Philadelphia at the age of 36, and was buried at Mount Vernon Cemetery.

== See also ==
- List of Major League Baseball player-managers

Preceded by –	Baltimore Orioles (AA) Managers; 1882	Succeeded by Billy Barnie
