= David Jones (baseball) =

American baseball player (1861–1937)

- Catcher / Outfielder
- Born: April 5, 1861; Utica, New York, U.S.
- Died: May 1, 1937 (aged 76); Utica, New York, U.S.
- Batted: Unknown Threw: Unknown

MLB debut
- May 17, 1882, for the Baltimore Orioles

Last MLB appearance
- July 1, 1882, for the Baltimore Orioles

MLB statistics
- Batting average: .067
- Home runs: 0
- Stats at Baseball Reference

Teams
- Baltimore Orioles (1882)

David E. Jones (April 5, 1861 – May 1, 1937) was an American professional baseball player. He appeared in four games for the Baltimore Orioles of the American Association in 1882. Until 2017, his statistics were mistakenly attributed to Bill Jones, a fellow 19th-century catcher from New York.

In 2000, a man contacted researchers at SABR and claimed his grandfather, David Jones, had played for the Baltimore Orioles. This was not confirmed until seventeen years later when researcher Justin McKinney found two mentions of Jones in archived newspapers from Utica, New York. The first was a single sentence in an 1882 edition of the Utica Daily Press indicating that a David Jones of Ilion was going to be catching for the Orioles. The second was a 1937 obituary in the Utica Observer Dispatch confirming that the David Jones who had recently died in that city had been a professional ballplayer.
