= Harry Jacoby (baseball) =

American baseball player

- Second baseman/Third Baseman/Outfielder
- Born: Unknown; Philadelphia
- Died: July 22, 1900; Philadelphia
- Batted: Unknown Threw: Unknown

MLB debut
- May 2, 1882, for the Baltimore Orioles

Last MLB appearance
- September 19, 1885, for the Baltimore Orioles

MLB statistics
- Batting average: .165
- Home runs: 1
- RBI: 1
- Stats at Baseball Reference

Teams
- Baltimore Orioles (1882, 1885)

Harry M. Jacoby (died July 22, 1900) was a professional baseball player in the American Association for the 1882 and 1885 Baltimore Orioles.
