= Lewis Smith (baseball) =

American baseball player (born 1858)

- Outfielder
- Born: 1858; Baltimore, Maryland
- Died: Unknown
- Batted: Unknown Threw: Unknown

MLB debut
- September 7, 1882, for the Baltimore Orioles

Last MLB appearance
- September 7, 1882, for the Baltimore Orioles

MLB statistics
- Batting Average: .000
- Home Runs: 0
- RBI: 0
- Stats at Baseball Reference

Teams
- Baltimore Orioles (1882)

Lewis J. Smith was a professional baseball player who played in the outfield in one game for the 1882 Baltimore Orioles in the American Association. He is often listed as just "L. Smith" in most sources.
