= Harry East =

American baseball player (1862–1905)

- Third baseman
- Born: April 12, 1862; St. Louis, Missouri, U.S.
- Died: June 1, 1905 (aged 43); St. Louis, Missouri, U.S.
- Batted: Left Threw: Left

MLB debut
- June 17, 1882, for the Baltimore Orioles

Last MLB appearance
- June 17, 1882, for the Baltimore Orioles

MLB statistics
- Batting Average: .000
- Home Runs: 0
- RBI: 0
- Stats at Baseball Reference

Teams
- Baltimore Orioles (1882)

Harry Hamlet East (April 12, 1862 – June 1, 1905) was an American professional baseball player who played in one game at third base for the Baltimore Orioles of the American Association in 1882. A St. Louis native, he was hitless in four at bats as the Orioles lost 10–5 to the St. Louis Browns at Sportsman's Park. He played two seasons of Minor league baseball as well, then became a doctor. After being admitted to a hospital with melancholia in 1905, East slit his throat with a straight razor, committing suicide at the age of 43.

== Early life ==
Harry Hamlet East was born on April 12, 1862. Frank Russo, in his 2014 book The Cooperstown Chronicles, lists East's birthplace as St. Louis, Missouri, where the ballplayer would spend most of his life. However, Baseball-Reference.com says he was born in Decatur, Illinois. His parents were William H. East and Ada Virginia Finnegin East. Growing up, Harry was interested in baseball as well as becoming a doctor.

== Baltimore Orioles ==
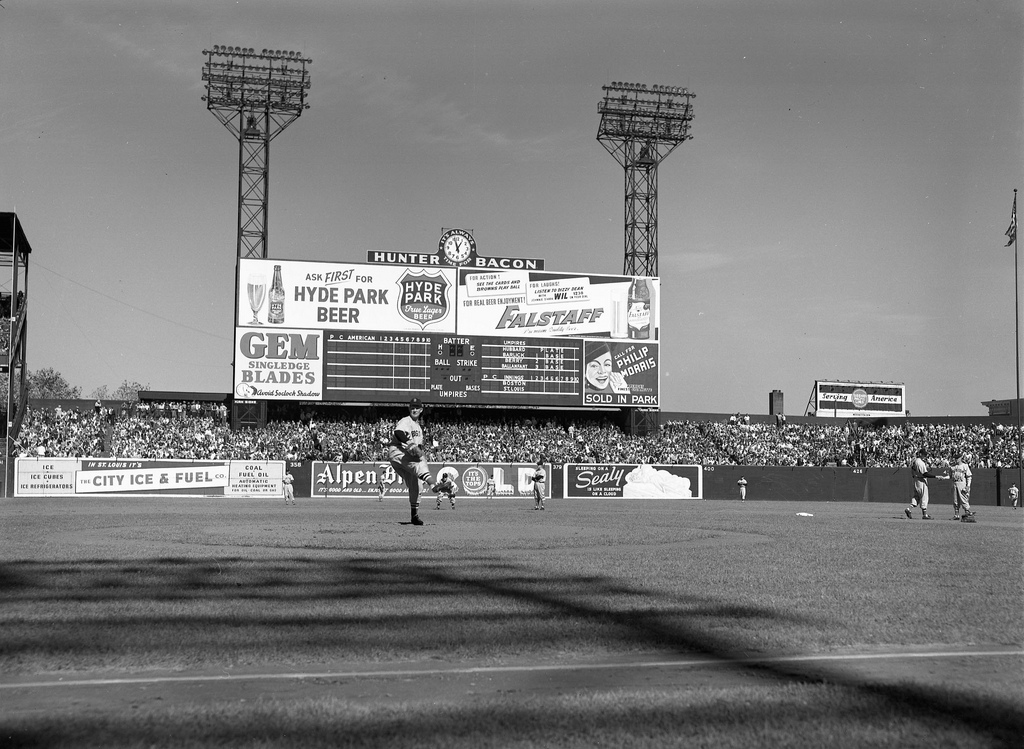
The site of Sportsman's Park featured several stadiums of that name, the longest-lasting being the 1909 structure, which served the American League's St. Louis Browns from 1909 through 1953 and the National League's St. Louis Cardinals from 1920 through 1966.

East's only Major League Baseball (MLB) game came on June 17, 1882, at Sportsman's Park in St. Louis, though he played for the visiting Baltimore Orioles as they competed against the St. Louis Browns of the fledgling American Association. He played third base in the contest, batting and throwing left-handed. East was hitless in four at bats as the Browns won 10–5.

== Minor league baseball ==
East also played at least two seasons of Minor League Baseball. He played for the Memphis Reds of the Southern League in 1885. In 12 games (45 at bats), he recorded nine runs scored and 12 hits. All but one of the hits were singles; the other was a double. He batted .267, with a slugging percentage of .289. In 1886, East played for the Lincoln Tree Planters of the Western League, though statistics from this season are unavailable. Following his time with Lincoln, he continued to play semipro baseball through 1889, after which he decided to become a doctor.

== Later years ==
In 1890, East enrolled at Barnes Medical College in St. Louis. After graduating, he remained in St. Louis. "By all accounts, he had a thriving practice," writes Russo.

East checked into the Alexian Brothers' Hospital as a melancholia patient in May 1905. On June 2, he committed suicide, using a straight razor to slit his throat. Orderlies discovered him too late to prevent his death. He was buried a few days later in the International Order of Odd Fellows (IOOF) Cemetery in Xenia, Illinois.
